= First Zulfikar Ali Bhutto government =

Pakistani Government (1973–1977)

First Zulfikar Ali Bhutto Government
- 17th and 18th Cabinet of Pakistan
- 1973-1977
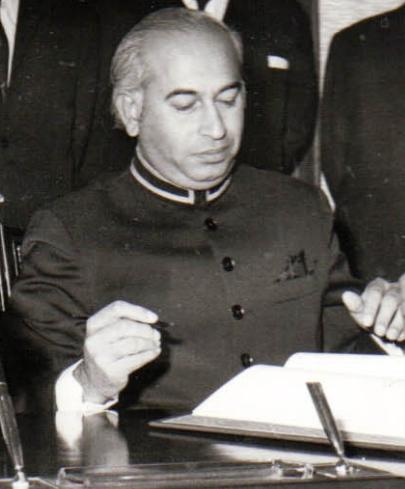
- Date formed: 14 August 1973
- Date dissolved: 30 March 1977

People and organisations
- Head of state: Fazal Ilahi Chaudhry
- Head of government: Zulfikar Ali Bhutto
- Member party: Pakistan People's Party
- Status in legislature: Majority government 85 / 146 (58%)

History
- Legislature terms: 5th National Assembly of Pakistan
- Successor: Second Zulfikar

The First Zulfikar Ali Bhutto government was the government of Pakistan led by Zulfikar Ali Bhutto from 1973 until 1977. It was formed after the 1973 Constitution of Pakistan was passed by the Parliament of Pakistan which fully re-established Pakistan as a parliamentary democracy. The government would oversee two different cabinets due to reshuffles, the First Zulfikar Ali Bhutto Cabinet ruled from 1973 until 1974, when the cabinet was reshuffled by Bhutto to the Second Zulfikar Ali Bhutto Cabinet which ruled from 1974 to 1977, which is when general elections were held, and the government was succeeded.

The prime minister of the government, Zulfikar Ali Bhutto was acclaimed as a powerful and skilled politician who had served as President of Pakistan under a presidential system government from 1971 to 1973. He was sworn in as the prime minister of the country on 14 August 1973, after securing 108 votes in a house of 146 members. Fazal Ilahi Chaudhry was elected as the president under the new constitution. During its five years of government, the Bhutto administration implemented extensive reforms at every level of governance. Capital and Western reforms initiated and built in 1947 were transformed and replaced with a socialist system throughout the 1970s with extensive nationalization. Bhutto's policies were perceived as people-friendly but failed to yield long-lasting effects, and civil disorder against Bhutto and his administration began to escalate in his second government in 1977.

== First cabinet (1973–1974) ==
Name	Portfolio	Period
Zulfikar Ali Bhutto	1. Prime Minister; 2. Cabinet Division; 3. Ministry of Defence; 4. Ministry of Foreign Affairs; 5. Ministry of Industries; 6. Pakistan Atomic Energy Commission	17 August 1973 to 22 October 1974
Jalaludin Abdur Rahim	1. Ministry of Production; 2. Town Planning & Agrovilles; 3. Ministry of Commerce	17 August 1973 to 2 July 1974
Abdul Qayyum Khan	Ministry of Interior, States & Frontier Regions and Kashmir Affairs	17 August 1973 to 22 October 1974
Mubashir Hassan	Ministry of Finance, Planning & Development	17 August 1973 to 22 October 1974
Hayat Sherpao	Ministry of Fuel, Power and Natural Resources	17 August 1973 to 13 February 1974
Sheikh Mohammad Rashid	1. Ministry of Health & Social Welfare; 2. Chairman, Federal Land Commission	17 August 1973 to 22 October 1974; 23 December 1973 to 22 October 1974
Khurshid Hasan Meer	1. Minister without portfolio 2. Looked after the work of Establishment Division and Ministry of Science and Technology; 3. Ministry of Communications; 4. Ministry of Railways (Temporarily)	17 August 1973 to 22 October 1974; 17 August 1973 to 22 October 1974; 23 December 1973 to 22 October 1974; 30 August 1974 to 22 October 1974
Ghulam Mustafa Jatoi	Ministry of Political Affairs & Communications	17 August 1973 to 23 December 1973
Abdul Hafiz Pirzada	1. Ministry of Education and Provincial Coordination; 2. Ministry of Law & Parliamentary Affairs	17 August 1973 to 22 October 1974
Maulana Kausar Niazi	Ministry of Information & Broadcasting, Auqaf and Hajj	17 August 1973 to 22 October 1974
Ghous Bakhsh Raisani	Ministry of Food, Agriculture & Rural Development	17 August 1973 to 13 February 1974
Muhammad Hanif	1. Ministry of Labour & Works; 2. Ministry of Fuel, Power and Natural Resources (Temporarily)	17 August 1973 to 22 October 1974; 13 February 1974 to 22 October 1974
Tridev Roy	Ministry of Minorities Affairs & Tourism	14 August 1973 to 22 October 1974
Rafi Raza	1. Production; 2. Commerce	3 July 1974 to 22 October 1974
Mahmud Ali	National Affairs, Overseas Pakistanis and Prisons	14 August 1973 to 13 February 1974
Jamal Dar	Public Affairs	17 August 1973 to 22 October 1974
Aziz Ahmad	Defence and Foreign Affairs	17 August 1973 to 22 October 1974

== Second cabinet (1974–1977) ==
As part of a reshuffle, Prime minister Ali Bhutto removed certain ministers. The new ministers were sworn in October 1974.

Name	Portfolio	Period
Zulfikar Ali Bhutto	1. Prime Minister; 2. Ministry of Defence; 3. Ministry of Foreign Affairs; 4. Ministry of Interior, States and Frontier Regions	22 October 1974 to 28 March 1977; 22 October 1974 to 28 March 1977; 13 January 1977 to 28 March 1977
Abdul Qayyum Khan	Ministry of Interior, States & Frontier Regions	22 October 1974 to 13 January 1977
Sheikh Mohammad Rashid	1. Ministry of Food, Agriculture and Cooperative Works, Under Developed Areas and Land Reforms	22 October 1974 to 5 February 1976; 5 September 1976 to 28 March 1977
Khurshid Hasan Meer	Ministry of Labour, Health, Social Welfare and Population Planning	22 October 1974 to 18 December 1974
Abdul Hafiz Pirzada	1. Ministry of Education, Science & Technology and Provincial Coordination; 2. Ministry of Education and Provincial Coordination	22 October 1974 to 5 February 1976; 5 February 1976 to 28 March 1977
Rana Mohammad Hanif Khan	Ministry of Finance, Planning & Economic Affairs	22 October 1974 to 28 March 1977
Malik Meraj Khalid	1. Ministry of Law & Parliamentary Affairs; 2. Ministry of Labour, Health Social Welfare and Population Planning; 3. Ministry of Social Welfare, Local Government, and Rural Development	22 October 1974 to 5 February 1976; 21 December 1974 to 10 January 1975; 5 February 1976 to 27 March 1977
Mumtaz Bhutto	Ministry of Communications	22 October 1974 to 28 March 1977
Rafi Raza	Ministry of Production Industries and Town Planning	22 October 1974 to 28 March 1977
Maulana Kausar Niazi	1. Ministry of Religious Affairs; 2. Ministry of Religious Affairs, Minority Affairs and Overseas Pakistanis	22 October 1974 to 5 February 1976; 5 February 1976 to 28 March 1977
Yusuf Khattak	Ministry of Fuel, Power and Natural Resources	22 October 1974 to 13 January 1977
Mir Afzal Khan	1. Ministry of Commerce; 2. Ministry of Commerce and Tourism	22 October 1974 to 5 February 1976; 5 February 1976 to 28 March 1977
Yahya Bakhtiar	Attorney General for Pakistan	22 October 1974 to 28 March 1977
Hafizullah Cheema	1. Ministry of Labour, Health, Social Welfare and Population Planning; 2. Ministry of Railways	10 January 1975 to 5 February 1976; 5 February 1976 to 28 March 1977
Syed Qaim Ali Shah	1. Ministry of Industries, Kashmir Affairs & Northern Affairs; 2. Ministry of Agrarian Management, Kashmir Affairs & Northern Affairs	5 February 1976 to 17 July 1976; 17 July 1976 to 28 March 1977
Malik Mohammad Akhtar	1. Ministry of Law & Parliamentary Affairs; 2. Ministry of Fuel Power and Natural Resources	5 February 1976 to 28 March 1977; 20 January 1977 to 28 March 1977
Mohammad Haneef Khan	Ministry of Information & Broadcasting	5 February 1976 to 28 March 1977
Syed Nasir Ali Rizvi	Ministry of Housing & Works and Urban Development	5 February 1976 to 28 March 1977
Taj Muhammad Jamali	Ministry of Labour, Manpower, Health and Population Planning	5 February 1976 to 28 March 1977
Mian Mohammad Ataullah	Ministry of Industries	17 July 1976 to 28 March 1977
