= Second Zulfikar Ali Bhutto government =

Pakistani Government, March-July 1977

Second Zulfikar Ali Bhutto Government
- 19th Cabinet of Pakistan
- March 1977 - July 1977
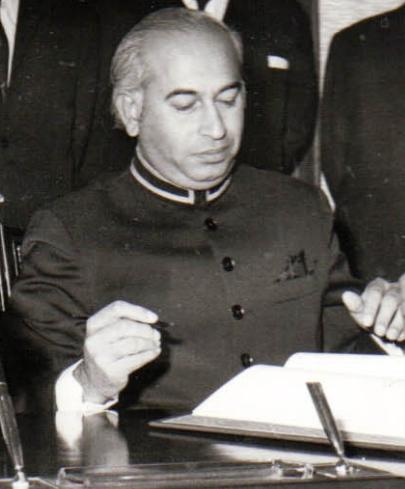
- Date formed: 30 March 1977
- Date dissolved: 5 July 1977

People and organisations
- Head of state: Fazal Ilahi Chaudhry
- Head of government: Zulfikar Ali Bhutto
- Member party: Pakistan People's Party
- Status in legislature: Supermajority 155 / 216 (72%)
- Opposition party: Pakistan National Alliance
- Opposition leader: Abdul Wali Khan

History
- Legislature terms: 6th National Assembly of Pakistan
- Predecessor: First Zulfikar
- Successor: Zia administration

Second Zulfikar Ali Bhutto government was formed on 30 March 1977 after Zulfikar Ali Bhutto gained a large majority in the 1977 Pakistani general election. The government was dissolved on 5 July 1977 when Muhammad Zia-ul-Haq declared martial law.

== Cabinet ==
=== Federal Ministers ===
Minister	Portfolio	Period
Zulfiqar Ali Bhutto	Prime Minister; Ministry of Defence	30 March 1977 to 5 July 1977
Sheikh Mohammad Rashid	Ministry of Agriculture, Co-operative and Land Reforms	30 March 1977 to 5 July 1977
Rana Mohammad Hanif Khan	Ministry of Commerce and Local Government	30 March 1977 to 5 July 1977
Abdul Hafeez Pirzada	Ministry of Finance, Planning and Provincial Co-ordination	30 March 1977 to 5 July 1977
Mir Afzal Khan	Ministry of Water and Power	30 March 1977 to 5 July 1977
Mumtaz Bhutto	Ministry of Communications	30 March 1977 to 5 July 1977
Kausar Niazi	Ministry of Religious Affairs, Minorities Affairs and Overseas Pakistanis	30 March 1977 to 5 July 1977
Aziz Ahmed	Ministry of Foreign Affairs	30 March 1977 to 5 July 1977
Yahya Bakhtiar	Attorney General	30 March 1977 to 5 July 1977
Hamid Raza Gilani	Ministry of Industries	30 March 1977 to 5 July 1977
Muhammad Haneef Khan	Ministry of States & Frontier Regions and Kashmir Affairs	30 March 1977 to 5 July 1977
Taj Muhammad Jamali	Ministry of Health and Population Planning	30 March 1977 to 5 July 1977
Yasin Wattoo	Ministry of Education	30 March 1977 to 5 July 1977
S. M. Masood	Ministry of Law and Parliamentary Affairs	30 March 1977 to 5 July 1977
Abdul Sattar Gabol	Ministry of Labour and Manpower	30 March 1977 to 5 July 1977
Tahir Mohammad Khan	Ministry of Information & Broadcasting	30 March 1977 to 5 July 1977
Arbab Jehangir Khan	Ministry of Housing and Works	30 March 1977 to 5 July 1977
Nur Hayat Noon	Ministry of Culture, Archaeology, Sports and Tourism	30 March 1977 to 5 July 1977
Makhdoom Hameed-ud-Din	Ministry of Petroleum and Natural Resources	30 March 1977 to 5 July 1977
Ghulam Hussain	Ministry of Railways	30 March 1977 to 5 July 1977
Anwar Aziz Chaudhry	Ministry of Food and Agrarian Management	30 March 1977 to 5 July 1977
Farooq Leghari	Ministry of Production	30 March 1977 to 5 July 1977
Niaz Muhammad Wassan	Ministry of Science and Technology	30 March 1977 to 5 July 1977

=== Minister of State ===
Minister	Portfolio	Period
Tikka Khan	Minister of State for Defence and National Security	27 April 1977 to 5 July 1977
