= People's Guard (Pakistan) =

Pakistani leftist paramilitary group

- پیپلز گارڈ
- Founders: Zulfikar Ali Bhutto; Sheikh Mohammad Rashid; Maj Gen. Akbar Khan
- Commander: Akbar Khan
- Dates active: 1970—1973
- Merged into: Peoples Students Federation
- Country: Pakistan
- Allegiance: Pakistan Peoples Party
- Headquarters: Karachi, Lahore
- Active regions: West Pakistan
- Ideology: Islamic socialism Left-wing nationalism
- Political position: Left-wing

The People's Guard also known as the Red Guards, was a left-wing paramilitary group and defense wing of Zulfikar Ali Bhutto's Pakistan People's Party active from 1970 to 1973. Commanded by former Major general Akbar Khan, it engaged in street fighting against right-wing opposition groups.

Formed in 1970 during a period of intense ideological street violence in Pakistan, the People's Guard was initially tasked with protecting PPP leaders and political rallies from rival right-wing factions.

== Formation ==
The Pakistan People's Party was forming the People's Guards in early 1969.

According to Pakistani journalist Nadeem F. Paracha, writing in a Dawn column, during the political campaigning in the lead up to the 1970 Pakistani general election, PPP rallies and workers came under increasing attacks by rival political groups and factions, most notably right-wing student groups such as Islami Jamiat-e-Talaba.

Paracha further states that following a violent attack at a party rally in Lahore, left-wing student leaders Meraj Muhammad Khan and Raja Anwar advised Zulfikar Ali Bhutto, the chairman of the Pakistan People's Party, to establish a security wing. This led to the creation of the Peoples Guard which was supervised by Sheikh Mohammad Rashid.

Bhutto stated in an interview that the creation of the People's Guard was the beginning of a broader, massive effort to mobilize the general population for national defense.

== Activity ==
The chief organizer of the People's Guard was ex Major-General Akbar Khan, who was an advisor of Bhutto. He later went on to serve as the Minister of Internal Security. He was also the commander of the guards and oversaw their deployment.

=== Pre-Bhutto era (1970-1971) ===
Initially, the group drew its members from various National Students Federation (NSF) factions alongside working-class party loyalists from Lahore and Karachi. New recruits took an oath on the Quran swearing absolute loyalty to Zulfikar Ali Bhutto, pledging to carry out his orders at the risk of their lives. They were primarily armed with clubs, knives, chains, and limited firearms, the Peoples Guard engaged in street skirmishes with the IJT until the attacks subsided. They were also tasked with protecting the right of the working class and peasants.

Following the 1971 Indian Airlines hijacking, the PPP threatened to use the People's Guard for the "Liberation of Kashmir." On 24 March 1971, it was announced that the People's Guard would start a "show of force" lasting 1 week.

=== Instability in Pakistan (1972-1973) ===
In 1972, Maj-gen Akbar Khan disclosed that the People's Guards would soon be acquiring firearms.

In February 1972, police officers and civil servants went on strike throughout the country. The People's Guard engaged in physical clashes with striking police officers. The People's Guard also fought against armed Pashtun dissidents in the North-West Frontier Province during anti-state demonstrations.

That month, National Awami Party (NAP) leader Abdul Wali Khan called on Zulfikar Ali Bhutto to lift martial law. Khan warned that if martial law remained in effect, he would oppose elections in the North-West Frontier Province and Baluchistan, arguing that Bhutto would use his martial law authority to rig the elections and establish a political stronghold in the two provinces.

Khan organised the Pakhtoon Zalmai ("Pathan Youth"), a volunteer organisation formed shortly after the People's Guard. The People's Guard had begun dressing its volunteers in uniforms resembling those of the police and Maj Gen Akbar Khan suggested that the organisation would eventually be armed. Referring to Bhutto's regime, Abdul Wali Khan said, "If they want civil war, the Pathans will be ready."

Journalists began to fear personal reprisals from the People's Guard, as they reportedly became increasingly conspicuous. According to some sources, the People's Guard began to function as a coercive tool to intimidate political rivals. It also contained a 1973 police strike in Lahore.

== Dissolution ==
As Zulfikar Ali Bhutto consolidated power, the role of the People's Guard was replaced with the Federal Security Force (FSF). Following the passing of the Private military organizations (abolition and prohibition) act under Article 256 under the 1973 Constitution of Pakistan, all civilian militias were banned.

Although the People's Guard was never formally disbanded, its operational role and personnel were ultimately absorbed into the Federal Security Force in 1973 and it's use was reduced substantially.

The People's Guard have a mixed legacy. Opponents of Bhutto's government compared them to Adolf Hitler's SA stormtroopers and Benito Mussolini's Blackshirts
