= Akbar Khan (general, born 1912) =

Pakistani General (1912–1993)

Akbar Khan DSO MBE
- اکبر خان
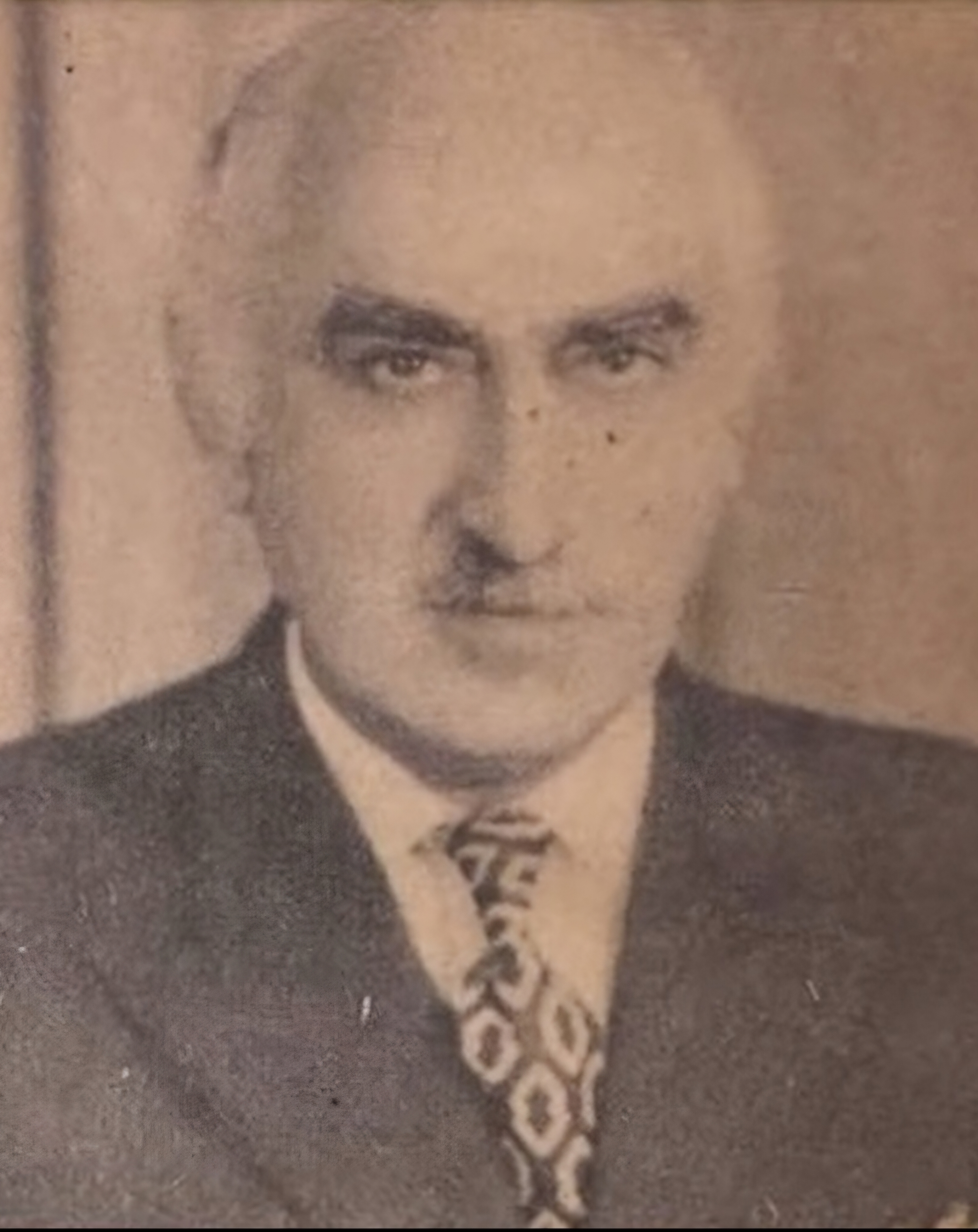
- Portrait, c. 1972

2nd National Security Minister of Pakistan
- In office 20 December 1971 – 22 June 1973
- President: Zulfikar Ali Bhutto
- Preceded by: Ghulam Umar
- Succeeded by: Tikka Khan

Commander of the People's Guard
- In office 1970–1973
- Preceded by: Position established
- Succeeded by: Haq Nawaz Tiwana (As Head of the FSF)

2nd Chief of the General Staff Pakistan Army
- In office December 1950 – 9 March 1951
- Preceded by: Reginald Antony Hutton
- Succeeded by: Mohammad Yusuf Khan

Personal details
- Born: 1 December 1912 Utmanzai, NWFP, British India (now KPK, Pakistan)
- Died: 5 June 1993 (aged 81) Karachi‚ Sindh, Pakistan
- Resting place: Defence Military Graveyard
- Party: Pakistan People's Party
- Spouse: Nasim Jahan (div. 1959)
- Education: Islamia College, Peshawar; Sandhurst Military Academy; Joint Services Staff College (UK)
- Profession: Lawyer; Minister; Diplomat

Military service
- Allegiance: British Empire; Pakistan
- Branch/service: British Indian Army (1934–1947); Pakistan Army (1947–1951)
- Years of service: 1934—1951
- Rank: Major General
- Unit: 13th Frontier Force Rifles
- Commands: Chief of the General Staff (1950–1951); 101st Infantry Brigade (1948); Director of Weapons and Equipment (1947–1948); 14th Battalion, 13th Frontier Force Rifles (1943–1945)
- Battles/wars: Waziristan Campaign; World War II; Burma campaign; Indo-Pakistani War of 1947
- Awards: Distinguished Service Order; Member of the Order of the British Empire
- Service number: IA – 280 (1933-1947); PA – 25 (1950-1951)

Akbar Khan (1 December 1912 – 5 June 1993) DSO MBE was a highly decorated officer of the British Indian Army and general in the Pakistan Army. A pioneer of proxy warfare, Khan commanded tribal forces in the first Kashmir War. In 1951, he was convicted of planning a left-wing coup. He later became a lawyer and advisor of Zulfikar Ali Bhutto.

Gaining a King's Commission into the British Indian Army in 1934, Khan saw active combat in the Burma campaign during World War II. Displaying bravery and gallantry, he was recommended for a Victoria Cross. He played a key role in planning the tribal invasion of Kashmir in 1947, leading to the first war with India, where he later assumed full command of the tribal forces under the pseudonym General Tariq. (Note: 'General Tariq' was the code name assigned to the chief commander of all the rebel forces and raiders operating on behalf of Azad Kashmir, as per the Operation Gulmarg plan. The pseudonym was first used by Russell K. Haight before Khan took over direct command of the rebels.)

In 1951, he was convicted of being the ringleader of a planned left-wing coup along with several other communist figures such as Sajjad Zaheer and Faiz Ahmad Faiz, that came to be known as the Rawalpindi conspiracy. He was released after serving 5 years.

He became a founding member of the Pakistan People's Party and helped organise the People's Guard and served as its commander. He later became an advisor of President Zulfikar Ali Bhutto and served as the Minister for internal security in his government from 1971 to 1973. Under his guidance, the Army quelled the Baloch Insurgency. He also served as the ambassador to Czechoslovakia from 1973 to 1974. His political career came to an end following the 1977 Pakistani military coup. He died in 1993 in Karachi.

He has been described as one of the ablest officers of the British Indian Army. He has also been credited as an architect of proxy warfare by aiding non-state actors.

== Early life and education ==
Akbar Khan was born on 1 December 1912 in the village of Utmanzai in the district of Charsadda in the North-West Frontier Province. He belonged to an affluent Pashtun family of the Pareech Khel clan, a subtribe within the Utmanzai branch of the larger Muhammadzai tribe.

His father, Haji Mohammad Akram Khan (1880–1954), was an affluent landowner, educationist and tribal elder. Akram was a material and financial supporter of Abdul Ghaffar Khan's educational initiatives and notably donated his primary house and land to establish the campus of Azad School Utmanzai in April 1921.

Akbar Khan had attended the Islamia College University in Peshawar. He was later selected to be trained at the Royal Military College, Sandhurst in England as part of the final batch of Indian gentlemen cadets, completing his course in late 1933. He was King's Commissioned as a Second Lieutenant into the British Indian Army in February 1934, initially serving with the Royal Hampshire Regiment for experience for one year. His date of commission was later antedated to 31 August 1933 and he joined the 13th Frontier Force Rifles in 1935.

In October 1936, Khan officially qualified as a 1st Class Interpreter in Urdu, and was listed in the specialised "Interpreters" branch of the army. He had a reputation as a practical joker in the army. He was also a keen hockey player.

== Military career (1934-1951) ==
=== British Indian Army & World War II ===
He took part in operations in the Waziristan war for two years from 1937 to 1938.

During the Second World War he served with the 14th battalion, 13th Frontier Force Rifles, part of 100th Indian Infantry Brigade of the 20th Indian Division during active combat operations against the Imperial Japanese Army in the Burma campaign.

On 31 August 1941, he was promoted to substantive captain. As a captain and temporary major he was awarded the Distinguished Service Order for conspicuous gallantry and leadership displayed during the Battle of Kwanlan Ywathit.

During the heavy fighting in Irrawaddy, Khan commanded the "B" company. He later independently commanded this company along with the "C" company as communication with GHQ was poor. British officers under Khan's command remarked that it never crossed their mind that Akbar Khan was a native Indian.

==== Victoria Cross citation ====
For his immense bravery during the campaign, Major General Douglas Gracey, who commanded Akbar Khan's division, recommended Khan for the Victoria Cross, the highest and most prestigious British award for gallantry in the face of the enemy that can be awarded to British and Commonwealth forces. However, due to a lack of credible witness' that had survived the intense fighting, Khan was instead awarded the Distinguished Service Order, further endorsed by General William Slim.

He was also appointed a Member of the Order of the British Empire.

=== Pakistan Army ===
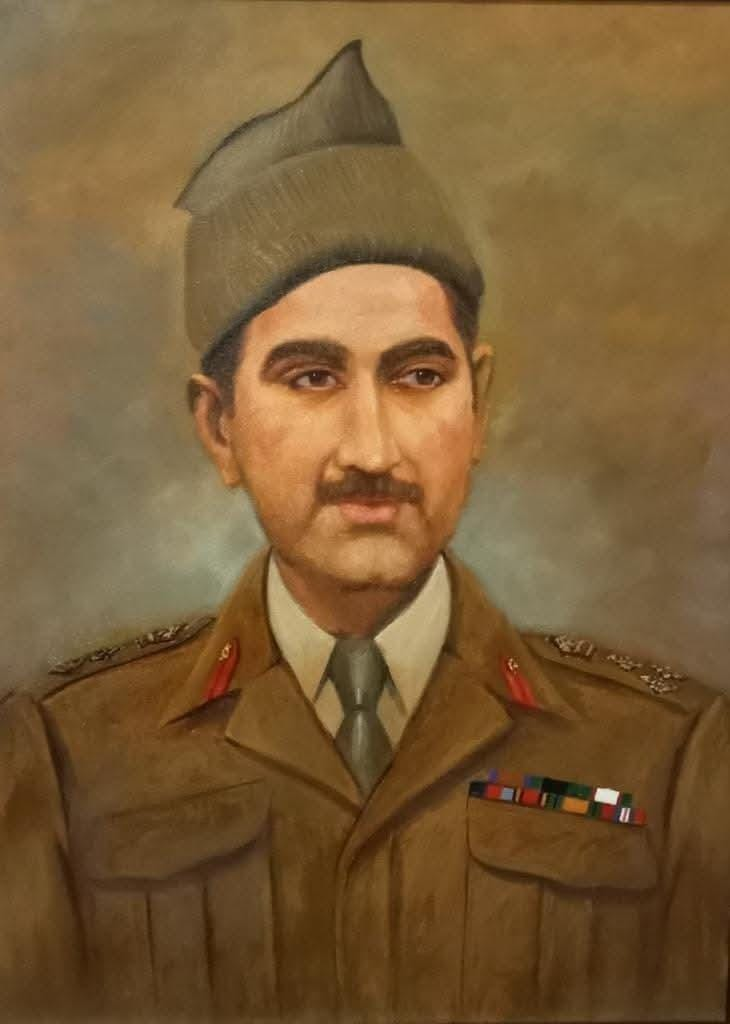
A painting of Brigadier Khan c. 1948, exhibited at the Army Institute of Military History.

During the Partition of India in 1947, Lieutenant-Colonel Khan opted for the Pakistan Army.

At the time of the independence of Pakistan in 1947, Akbar Khan was a member of the sub-committee involved in the division of the armed forces between the newly created states of India and Pakistan. He was also the only serving officer of the Pakistan Army who held a DSO. In September 1947, he was appointed Director of weapons and equipment at the General Headquarters in Rawalpindi.

Akbar Khan's own book Raiders in Kashmir (National Book Foundation, Pakistan, 1975) gives a thorough account of his role in the Pakistani attack on Maharaja Hari Singh's princely state of Jammu and Kashmir. His original role was in arranging guns and devising strategies for the Poonch rebels organised by Sardar Ibrahim with the assistance of the Pakistan Army. He makes clear he had no involvement in the Pashtun lashkars organised by Khurshid Anwar, which invaded the state on 22 October 1947.

Less than two months after Independence, fighting started in Kashmir, the Indian Army landed in Srinagar and confronted the Pathan tribesmen who were advancing towards the valley. Akbar Khan, who was then a brigadier, assumed command of the regulars and irregulars fighting against the Indian forces and was given the code name "General Tariq".

In July 1950, Brigadier Akbar Khan successfully completed the 6th Course at the British Joint Services Staff College (JSSC). It was during this time that he met communists in London, which led him to come under suspicion by British intelligence agencies. In December 1950, he was promoted to Major General. He was proposed to be appointed as the first native Commander-in-Chief of the Pakistan Army along with Major-general Ayub Khan. On 9 March 1951, Akbar Khan, then Chief of the General Staff was arrested by police when his involvement in the Rawalpindi Conspiracy came to light.

== The Rawalpindi Conspiracy ==
=== Change of heart ===
It was during this period that he first became dissatisfied with the moral and material support being given to the Pakistani fighters by Liaquat Ali Khan's government. He also had a grudge against General Douglas David Gracey, then Commander-in-Chief of the Pakistan Army, who had put a brake on the deeper involvement of the Pakistani army on the Kashmir front. Akbar Khan was of the opinion – rightly or wrongly – that acceptance of the ceasefire in Kashmir when he was only four hours away from capturing Srinagar was a mistake, and the armed operation against the Indian Army should have been continued.

The constraints under which Akbar Khan had to conduct the battle in Kashmir made him a very frustrated and dissatisfied man. By nature he was extremely brave and, in fact, rather rash. He was also very ambitious. All these qualities and tendencies combined to propel him towards conjuring up a plan to remove the Liaquat government by means of a coup d'état.

=== The conspiracy begins ===
In sheer frustration, Akbar Khan started discourses with other armed forces officers to form a group to stage a military coup. The government also became suspicious of his moves. Akbar Khan's wife, Nasim Shahnawaz (daughter of the famous Muslim League woman politician Begum Jahanara Shahnawaz), was quite indiscreet in her conversation, criticizing the Government and its policies before all and sundry, as did Akbar Khan himself, to some extent. He thus came under the watch of the intelligence agencies.

Brigadier Akbar was now due for promotion on the basis of his seniority. In December, 1950, he was promoted to major general and posted as Chief of General Staff in GHQ. In his book Friends, Not Masters, General Ayub Khan wrote that he (Ayub) decided to post Akbar in the GHQ so that, firstly Akbar should not have direct command over troops like a division commander, and secondly because he could be kept under close watch by General Ayub Khan himself. Meanwhile, Akbar Khan continued his surreptitious meetings and discussions with various army officers and later with the civilians too.

=== The Communist Party connection ===
In those days the Communist Party of Pakistan was under tremendous pressure from Liaquat Ali Khan's government. It was not allowed to function openly as a political party. Arrest warrants had been issued for all the top leaders of the party — all the members of the party's central committee had gone underground. Ordinary workers and even sympathizers were often arrested, beaten, sent to the fearful Lahore Fort for interrogation and threatened with dire consequences if they did not break all connections with the CP. This was the climate of oppression of the left at that time.

Akbar Khan's wife Nasim had vast connections with political families and political personalities such as Faiz Ahmed Faiz, who was a committed sympathizer of the party. All these political connections brought together the Chief of General Staff and the CP leadership.

Apparently the general had promised the CP leadership that if he came to power he would stop the continuous governmental assault on the leftists; the CP would be allowed to function as a legitimate political party like any other party and to take part in the elections which General Akbar promised to hold a few months after consolidating his power. In return the CP and its affiliated trade unions, kissan (peasant) committees, etc., would welcome the military government. The Pakistan Times, one of the leading newspapers of that period, whose editor was Faiz Ahmed Faiz, would lend editorial support to General Akbar's new dispensation.

=== The day and co-conspirators ===
On 23 February 1951, a meeting was held at Major General Akbar Khan's house in which besides a number of military officers, three civilians were also present, namely Faiz Ahmed Faiz, Syed Sajjad Zaheer (General Secretary of the CP) and Mohammed Hussain Ata. In this meeting were also present Lt-Colonel Siddique Raja MC, and Major Mohammed Yousuf Sethi both of whom later obtained state pardon and became approvers in the case against the others. The Chief of General Staff Akbar Khan presented his plan in this meeting which was to arrest the Governor-General Khawaja Nazimuddin and the Prime Minister Liaquat Ali Khan, both of whom were expected to be in Rawalpindi after a week (Karachi being the capital at that time). The Governor-General was to be forced to announce the dismissal of the Liaquat Government and the formation of an interim government presumably under General Akbar Khan. General elections under the army's supervision were also promised but no timeframe was given. The general also spoke about Kashmir, land reforms, eradication of corruption and nepotism and some such other topic.

=== The probable leak ===
Among General Akbar's confidants was one Askar Ali Shah, a police officer who was although not present at the meeting of 23 February 1951, had been informed beforehand by the general that he was going to convene such a meeting. This police officer had been a confidant of the general for over two years (or more) and had never leaked out any secret. But this time he got cold feet and blurted out to his IG Police, who in turn informed the Governor NWFP about the meeting. The governor wasted no time in contacting the prime minister.

=== The conspiracy foiled ===
The first four persons to be arrested were the Chief of the General Staff Major General Akbar Khan, the Brigade Commander of Quetta, Brigadier M.A. Latif Khan, Faiz Ahmed Faiz and Akbar's wife Nasim. Later some other people were also picked up. But one of the accused, Mohammed Hussain Ata, who was underground eluded arrest for a long time. He was eventually arrested in East Pakistan about a month after the trial proceedings had commenced.

Most of the accused were originally kept in various Lahore jails and later shifted to Hyderabad jail where a special compound inside the jail had been renovated and turned into the court premises. A special tribunal had been formed by the government to hear the case. The tribunal consisted of Justice Sir Abdul Rahman of the federal court, Justice Mohammed Sharif of the Punjab High Court and Justice Amir-ud-Din of the Dacca High Court.

=== The trial ===
The trial began on 15 June 1951 at 8.00 a.m. The prosecution was led by the formidable A.K. Brohi - this was one of his earlier cases. Later he was to achieve great fame and notoriety as a legal adviser of dictators and authoritarians. The incomparable Huseyn Shaheed Suhrawardy appeared on behalf of Brigadier Latif and Z.H. Lari on behalf of General Akbar. Other famous practitioners who appeared for the defence were Malik Faiz Mohammed, Khawaja Abdul Rahim, Sahibzada Nawazish Ali and Qazi Aslam. Gradually as the case proceeded and continued month after month, many of the counsel departed due to the inability of their clients to pay them. But credit goes to H.S. Suhrawardy who fought till the very end even when his client had stopped paying him anything more.

The basic charge against all the accused was one of "Conspiracy to wage war against the King". "A careful scrutiny of the first charge" said the judgement, "shows that it relates to a conspiracy alleged by prosecution to have come into being for overthrowing the Government established by law in Pakistan by means of criminal force or show of criminal force." Other allegations, though punishable offences in themselves, were "either the consequences of this conspiracy or merely means to achieve the object for which it was stated to have been entered into." The judgement was, therefore, directed mainly to examine whether the evidence produced by the prosecution was sufficient to establish "(i) the existence of conspiracy; and if that is found established, (ii) who are proved to have been parties to it?" The evidence led by the prosecution to prove its case was both documentary and oral. The latter was of "persons, who, without being either parties or willing parties to it, either deposed to the existence of the conspiracy or stated facts which might lead a court to draw a conclusion in favour of its existence; and (of) persons who were either, on their own statements, or on account of admissions of facts made by them, or due to existence of other reasonable grounds, held to be willing parties to the conspiracy."

The case as presented by the prosecution, relied basically on the evidence of the two approvers, and other witnesses who gave circumstantial evidence. It was not a false case at all. In general the bulk of the evidence was true. But there was a major falsehood which negated all the claims of the state of presenting a truthful case before the tribunal.

The prosecution induced the approvers to state that at the end of the crucial meeting of 23 February 1951 the people present had agreed to overthrow the government. They had to tell this lie because otherwise the allegation of conspiracy would have fallen flat. According to the penal code a conspiracy is only established 'when two or more persons agree to commit an illegal act or a legal act by illegal means'. If there is no agreement there is no conspiracy under the law.

The Conspirators claimed that after eight long hours of discussion, of arguments and counter-arguments, of high tension and near nervous breakdown, the group of persons assembled in Akbar Khan's house that day had agreed not to take any steps in pursuance of the plan presented by the Chief of General Staff. There was no agreement, and therefore no conspiracy! General Akbar could have very well been punished under the Army Act for even presenting such a plan and for trying to subvert the loyalty of others.

In spite of wide differences in ideology and thinking between some individuals, the military and the people lived happily in the prison.

There were Major General Nazir Ahmad, who was an Ahmadi; Air Commodore M. K. Janjua who was Pakistan's first native Air Commodore; Major Hasan Khan was a Shia; Brigadier Latif was into the Deobandi ideology and read a lot of religious books; Brigadier Sadiq, Lt-Col Ziauddin and Captain Khizar Hayat had faith in pirs and murshids; Lt-Col Niaz Mohammad Arbab was a good-natured person, belonging to an affluent and influential Arbab family of Tekhal Bala, near Peshawar. He was totally uncommitted ideologically, so much so that much later he became a minister in General Muhammad Zia-ul-Haq's government.

Syed Sajjad Zaheer, Mohammed Hussain Ata and Faiz Ahmed Faiz were communists of varying degree. So was Major Ishaq Mohammed, but at that time he was still a beginner. Later, of course, Major Ishaq became a symbol of militant left-wing politics in Pakistan. He was a fearless person and used to argue with vehemence even with the judges of the Tribunal. After an exchange of hot words, Justice Sir Abdul Rahman thundered: "I will set you right", to which Ishaq boldly replied: "Go ahead, my Lord!" The Justice could then only mutter, "I pity you". Ishaq and Ata were both hot-tempered and indulged in blistering polemics when discussing politics in jail.

The two coolest customers in that circle were the senior members of the group, Syed Sajjad Zaheer and Faiz Ahmed Faiz.

== Aftermath ==
Of the fifteen, the only woman, Begum Nasim, was acquitted, while Major General Nazir Ahmad was dismissed from service and sentenced till the rising of the court. All the others received prison sentences ranging from a minimum of four years (civilians and junior officers) to a maximum of 12 years for Major General Akbar Khan.

In the words of the principal accused, Akbar Khan, it was General Ayub Khan (the Army C-in-C) who was the choreographer of this comic strip (conspiracy case) and who apparently had feared that Akbar Khan had about two divisions at his disposal, to support him. His ordeal after his arrest is best described in his own words:

.... In the early hours of the morning on 9 March 1951 I was arrested and carried away the whole of that day, a long distance from Pindi, to jail. In the deserted suburbs of what looked like a dead town, distant and asleep, that cold night, at 11 p.m. the massive doors of the jail groaned creaked and opened slowly to swallow a motor convoy that was bringing me in seventeen hours had been taken by that convoy speeding across territory that I had not been permitted to see, so that neither the route nor the destination should be known to me or anyone else interested in following us. That morning while I had been sleeping peacefully, a hundred men had surrounded my house and successfully overpowered my one unarmed watchman. Then Major-General Mian Hayauddin knocked at my bedroom window and said that he had to see me about something most urgent. I had gone at once, without even putting on shoes, through the study door to meet him. But as I emerged, men with bayonets and sten guns had rushed at me from three sides — the front and both flanks. I had been rushed at before, during the war, by the Japanese in fighting — but never by 20 to one and not when I was unarmed. I had only a split second to think and I had let them come on. I think it had been the complete failure of this melodrama to impress me at all that had stopped the men mid-stride. No bayonet or sten gun had reached my body — and the few hands that had been laid at me had been quickly withdrawn. A mere telephone call would have sufficed to tell me that I was under arrest. But instead all troops had been alerted and these men had apparently expected to be gunned down by some sort of desperado

Prime Minister Liaquat Ali Khan himself made the announcement from Lahore about the conspiracy which was generally regarded as treason and the conspiracy came to be known as "The Rawalpindi Conspiracy".

The UK High Commissioner in his 3rd report to his Government on the Rawalpindi Conspiracy ending 17 March 1951 on the question of evidence against the conspirators, stated that "General Akbar Khan was a dangerous man, under the influence of an ambitious wife, and that he had been regarded as very anti-Commonwealth before he went to the United Kingdom last year to attend the Joint Services Staff College. According to Gracey the Defence Secretary Iskander Mirza wished Akbar to go on to the Imperial Defence College to "complete his education". The impression was that on his return, he would be less anti-British, and it was felt that he might be sobered up by being given a responsible job under the eye of the Commander-in-Chief at GHQ. General Gracey also told Colonel Franklin that he had informed the Chief of the Imperial Staff of Akbar's tendencies before he had left for the course... According to an informant... the police have been investigating the activities of Akbar and his wife for the last two years, and General Gracey also maintains that these two, and certain of his friends, had been known as the "Young Turk Party". In spite of all this those in charge were, last December, quite happy to appoint the General to a key post in the Pakistan Army".

In 1957, Khan founded a political party, Millat, and formed the Kashmir Liberation Workers ' Committee in Lahore.

== Personal life ==
Akbar Khan was married to Nasim Jahan, a highly social woman who came from an affluent Lahore family. The couple had two children. The couple divorced in 1959 and Khan remarried in 1970. Both Akbar and Nasim later joined the government of Zulfikar Ali Bhutto in the 1970s.

== Later life and Death ==
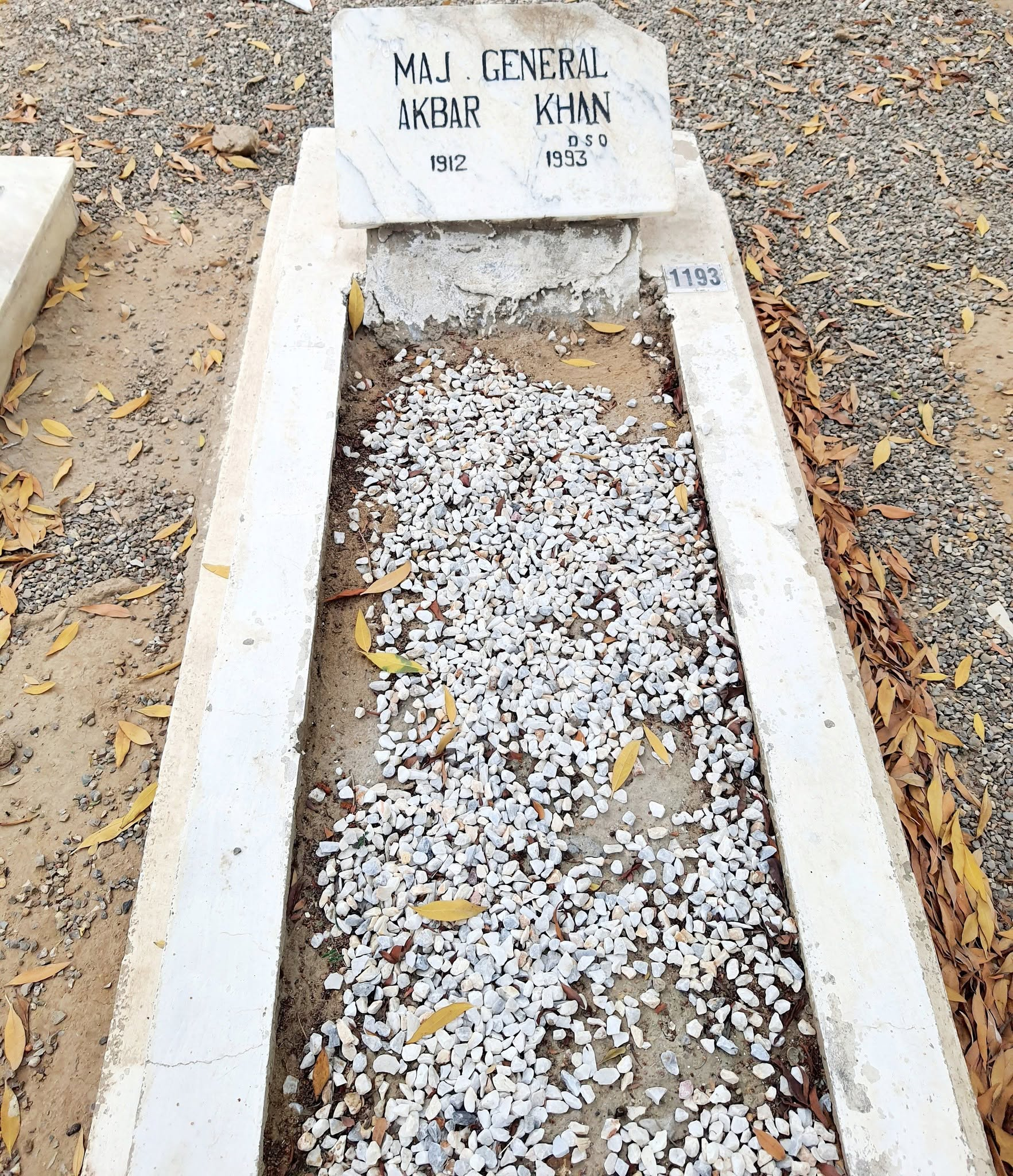
Grave of Akbar Khan

After the 1977 Pakistani military coup, which overthrew Bhutto's government, Khan reportedly went into hiding and later into exile. After returning to Pakistan, he retired from national politics. According to interviews conducted by military historians, including A. H. Amin between 1977 and 1993, Akbar Khan spent his later years residing in Defence Housing Authority Phase II in Karachi.

Akbar Khan died of natural causes on 5 June 1993 in Karachi. He is buried in Defence Military graveyard in the Karachi Cantonment.

== Works ==
- Akbar Khan (1975). Raiders in Kashmir. National Book Foundation — Islamabad. Second Edition. 210pp

== Awards and decorations ==
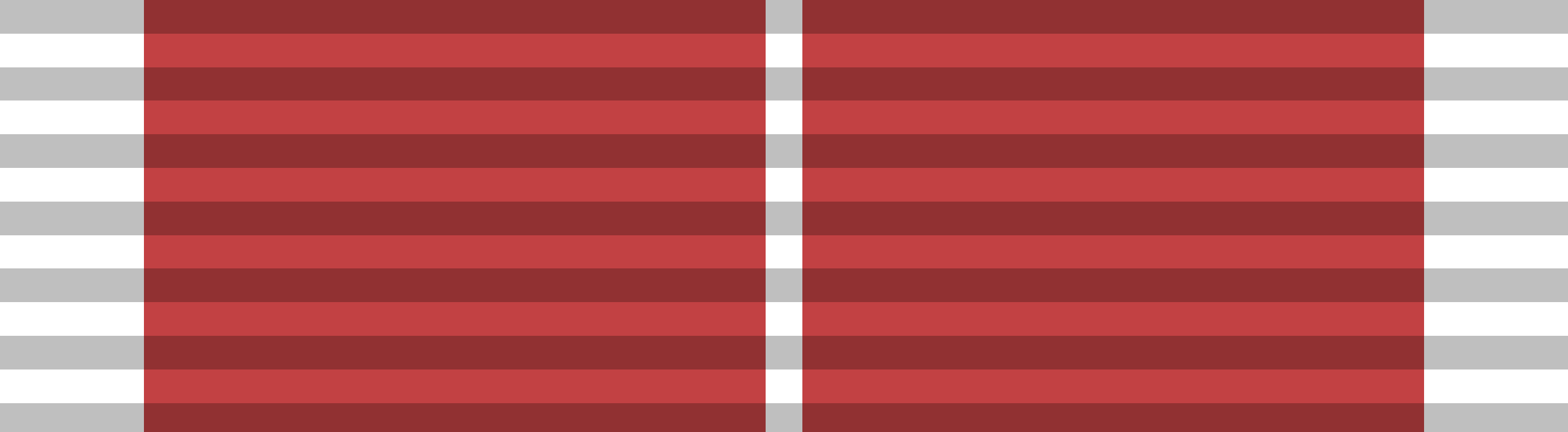

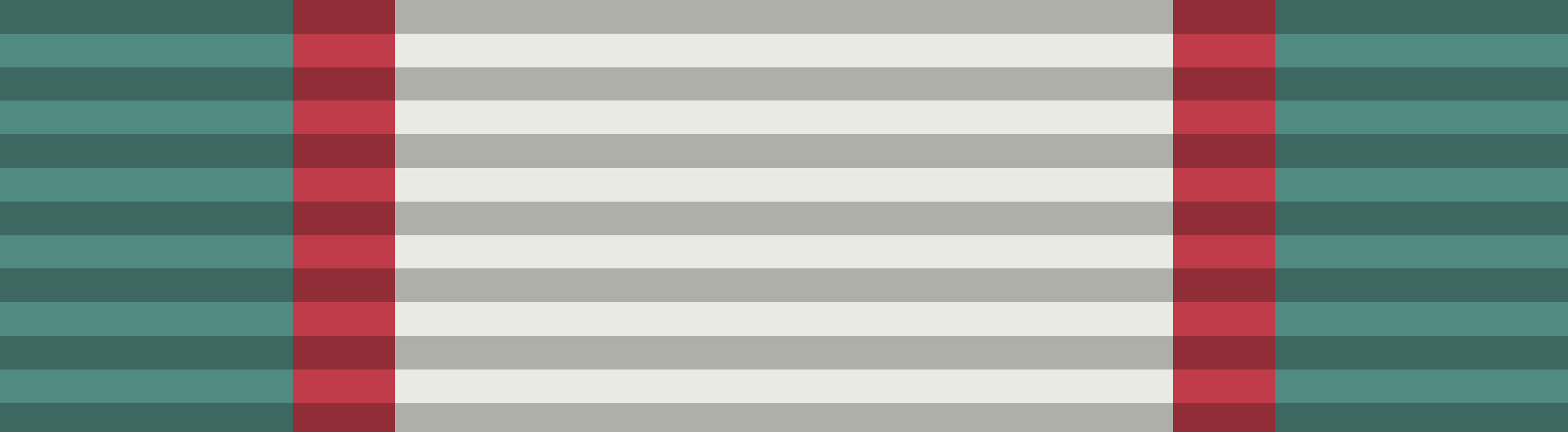

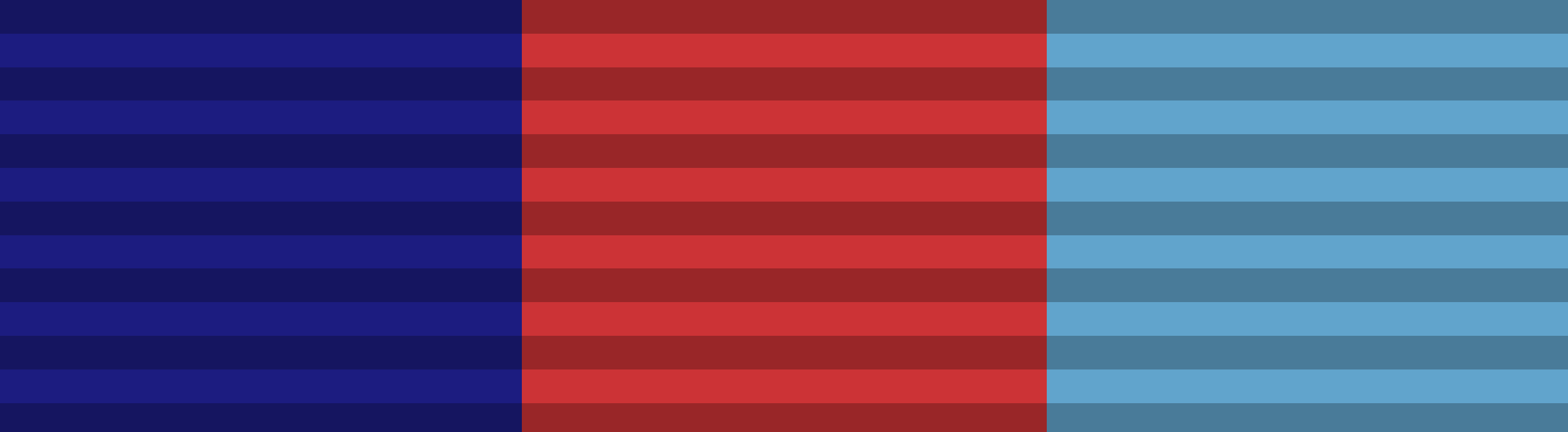

Distinguished Service Order (awarded for GALLANTRY in Burma)	Member of the Order of the British Empire (MBE)	India General Service Medal (1936) North West Frontier 1937–39 Clasp	India General Service Medal (1909)
1939–1945 Star	Burma Star	War Medal 1939–1945	Pakistan Tamgha (Pakistan Medal)

=== Foreign Decorations ===
Foreign Awards
UK	Distinguished Service Order
UK	Member of the Order of the British Empire (MBE)
UK	India General Service Medal (1936)
UK	India General Service Medal (1909)
UK	1939–1945 Star
UK	Burma Star
UK	War Medal 1939–1945

== Bibliography ==
- Lt Gen Attiqur Rahman (2005). Back to the Pavilion. Oxford University Press. ISBN 0-19-597861-7
- Khan, Lt Gen Gul Hassan (1993). Memoirs of Lt Gen Gul Hassan Khan. Oxford University Press. ISBN 0-19-577447-7
- Riza, Major Gen Shaukat (1984). The Pakistan Army – War 1965. Services Book Club.
- Riza, Major Gen Shaukat (1989). The Pakistan Army 1947–1949. Services Book Club.
- Zaheer, Hasan (1998). The Times and Trial of The Rawalpindi Conspiracy 1951. Oxford University Press. ISBN 0-19-577892-8
