= Loag Dar Loag =

2019 book by Farrukh Sohail Goindi

Log Der Log
- Author: Farrukh Sohail Goindi
- Language: Urdu
- Subject: Biographies / Memoirs
- Publisher: Jumhoori Publications, Lahore, Pakistan
- Publication date: March 20, 2019
- Publication place: Pakistan
- Media type: Hardcover
- Pages: 224 pp
- ISBN: 978-9696521518

Log Der Log is a 2019 Urdu book written by Farrukh Sohail Goindi. It was published by Jumhoori Publications, Lahore in March, 2019.

== About the author ==
The author of the book Farrukh Sohail Goindi is a Pakistani social-political activist, analyst, and publisher. He has been an active worker for the Pakistan People Party in its early phase. He belongs to Sargodha, Punjab.

== Synopsis ==
The book, "Log Der Log" (People after People) contains 32 personality sketches of some notable people from politics and other fields, whom the author met during his political career and foreign tours. The book includes features about the ex-Pakistani Prime Minister Zulfiqar Ali Bhutto, the ex-Turkish prime minister Bülent Ecevit, the Pakistan's first female prime minister Benazir Bhutto, the Turkish actress Nazan Saatci, the grand granddaughter of an Ottoman King Kenizé Mourad, the Prince Hassan bin Talal of Jordan, the wife of a UK prime minister Marina Wheeler, the former prime minister of India Inder Kumar Gujral, the Indian journalist Kuldip Nayar, the human rights activist Aasma Jahangir, the drama writer Munnu Bhai, the women's rights activist Madeeha Gauhar, the Indian novelist Khushwant Singh, Dr. Anwar Sajjad, Sheikh Mohammad Rashid, and other famous personalities.
