= Malik Muhammad Akhtar =

Pakistani politician (1915–1999)

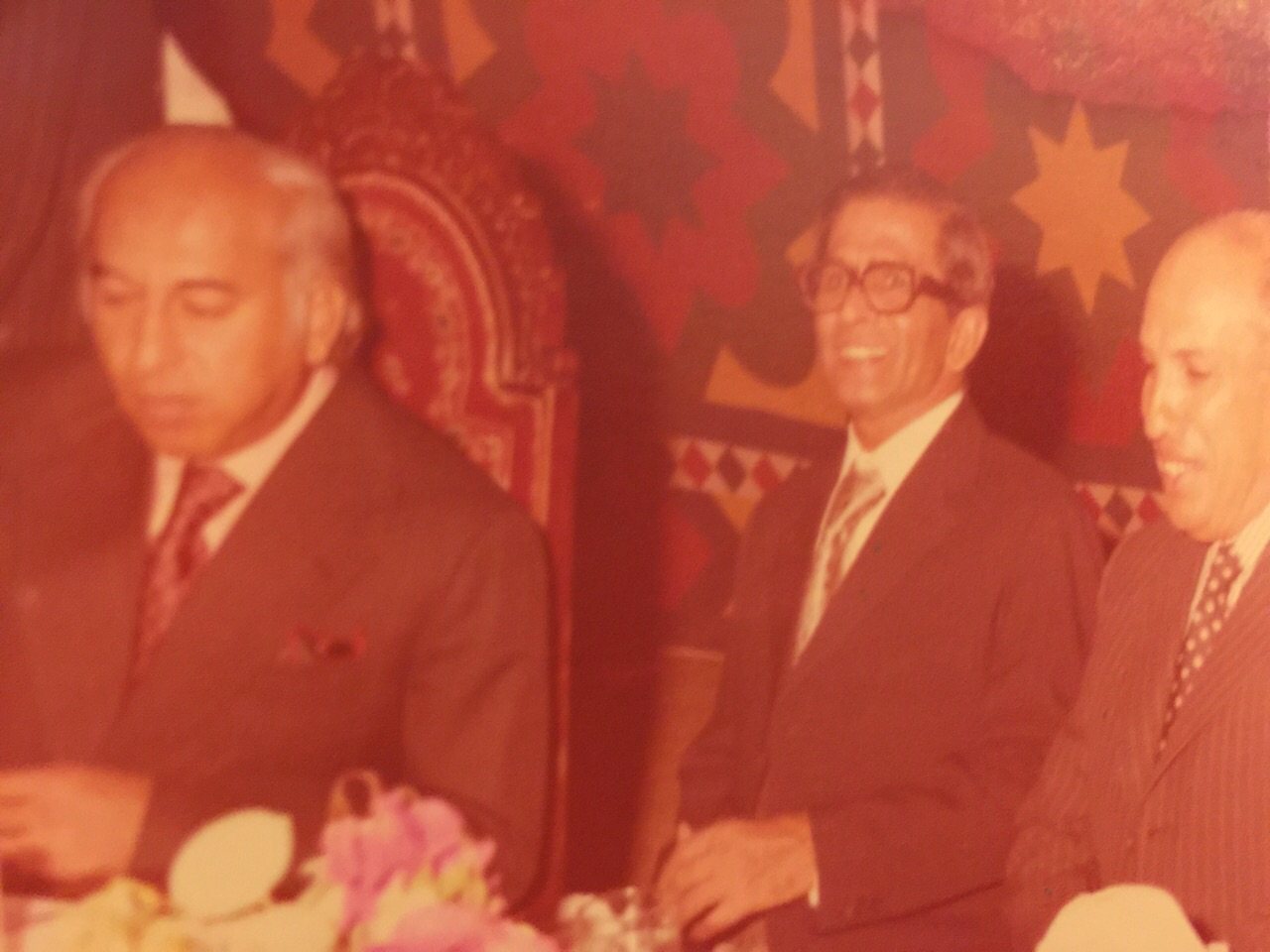

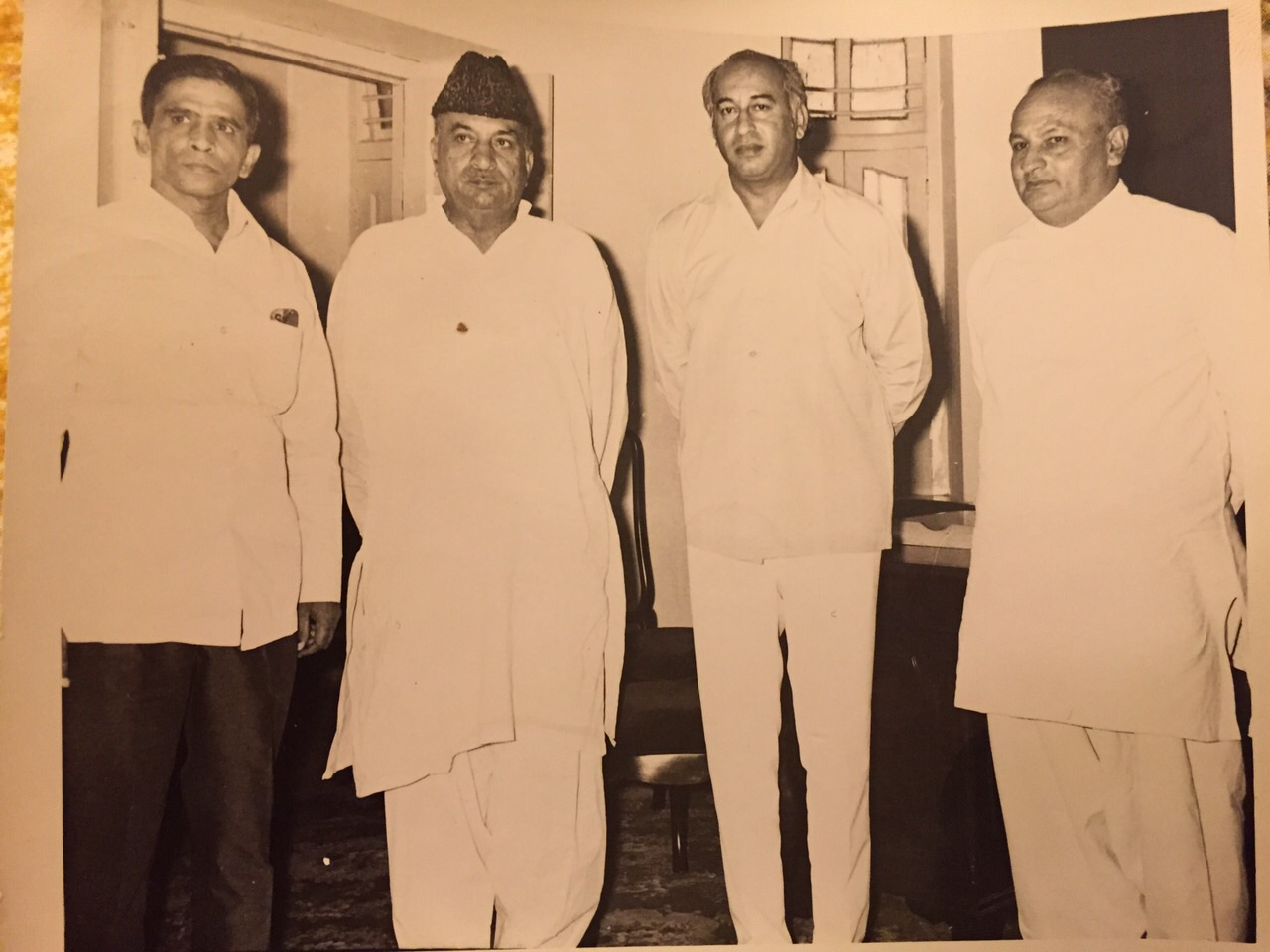

Malik Muhammad Akhtar (1915–1999) was a Pakistani politician, former Federal Minister for Law and Parliamentary Affairs and for Fuel Power and Natural Resources, human rights advocate and lawyer.

== Career ==
Malik Akhtar belonged to a Pashtun – Kakazai business family of Lahore and he entered politics at a young age and was elected as a councillor in Lahore pre-1947, following in the footsteps of his maternal uncle Muhammad Din Malik.

Malik Akhtar continued in politics and was elected as an Independent Member of the West Pakistan Legislative Assembly (1965–1969) from Lahore and was one of the only three independent representatives who sat in opposition to Field Marshal Gen. Ayub Khan.

In 1970, he joined the Pakistan People's Party (PPP) under the leadership of Zulfiqar Ali Bhutto and was elected from Lahore NW-58. He initially served as the State Minister for Parliamentary Affairs (1974–1976) and was later appointed Federal Minister of Law Minister and Parliamentary (1976–1977) and was also Federal Minister of Fuel Power and Natural Resources (1977) in Bhutto's Cabinet. He played a key role in the formation of Pakistan's constitution in 1973.

In the 1977 elections he was elected again from Lahore NA-86 and was appointed to Bhutto's cabinet before martial law was imposed by General Zia-ul-Haq.

He remained associated with PPP till the end and died on 2 May 1999.

He was educated at Government College Lahore & Punjab University Law College, Lahore.
