= Pakistan Peoples Party (disambiguation) =

Pakistan People's Party is a centre-left, social-democratic political party in Pakistan.

Pakistan Peoples Party may also refer to:

- Pakistan Peoples Party (Shaheed Bhutto), or PPP-SB, currently headed by Ghinwa Bhutto
- Pakistan Peoples Party (Sherpao), or PPP-S, currently headed by Aftab Ahmad Sherpao
- Pakistan Peoples Party Parliamentarians
- Pakistan Peoples Party Workers, a breakaway faction of Pakistan Peoples Party.
- Pakistan People's Party Parliamentarian-Patriots, a small 'forward bloc' that broke away from the PPP in 2002 to back the Musharraf led Pakistan Muslim League (Quaid-e-Azam) (PML-Q).
