= S. M. Masood =

S. M. Masood (d. 2012) was a Pakistani lawyer and a founding member of the Pakistan People's Party (PPP), as well as a close aide to Zulfikar Ali Bhutto.

== Career ==
Masood began his legal practice in 1958, Masood joined the PPP shortly after its formation. He was elected as a member of the Provincial Assembly of the Punjab from Lahore in 1973 and served as the provincial law minister.

In 1977, Masood was elected as a member of the National Assembly of Pakistan and subsequently appointed as the federal law minister in Zulfikar Ali Bhutto's cabinet. During the martial law period under General Zia-ul-Haq, Masood remained affiliated with Bhutto's party and was imprisoned as a result.

During Benazir Bhutto's first term as Prime Minister, Masood was named chairman of the People's Works Programme, a PPP initiative aimed at improving conditions for the labor class.
