= Jamal Dar =

Pakistani politician and general

Jamal Dar (died 1982) was a Pakistani politician and general who served as a member of the National Assembly of Pakistan from 1972 to 1977.

== Biography ==
Dar was born into Orakzai tribe of Tirah. Before joining politics, he served in Pakistan Army and retired as a major general.

In 1972, he was appointed as a minister of state. From 1981 to 1982, he was the Minister of Kashmir Affairs and Northern Affairs.
