= Rana Mohammad Hanif Khan =

Pakistani politician

Rana Mohammad Hanif Khan رانا محمد حنیف خان

11th Minister of Finance, Revenue & Economic Affairs
- In office 22 October 1974 – 28 March 1977
- Prime Minister: Zulfiqar Ali Bhutto
- Preceded by: Mubashar Hassan
- Succeeded by: Abdul Hafiz Pirzada

Personal details
- Born: c. 1922 Garhshanker, Punjab, British India
- Died: 2005 (aged 82 or 83) Sahiwal, Punjab, Pakistan
- Party: Pakistan Peoples Party
- Children: Rana Ahmed Saeed Khan; Rana Shabir Khan; Rana Khalid Hanif Khan; Rana Shakeel Hanif Khan; Tahira Hanif Rana; Farkhanda Hanif Rana

Rana Mohammad Hanif Khan (رانا محمد حنیف خان ) was a politician who served as the Finance minister of pakistan from 22 October 1974 to 28 March 1977. He was from Sahiwal, Punjab, Pakistan. He was the elder son of Ch. Nawab khan who migrated from India.

He was barrister at law from Lincoln's Inn, and was a member of the society of Lincoln's Inn. After that, he came to Pakistan and started his political career in 1970 with the Pakistan People's Party. He was twice elected as a Member of the National Assembly and was assigned a number of different ministerial portfolios over a span of seven years.
