= Army Institute of Military History =

Semi-autonomous research body of Pakistan Army

- آرمی انسٹی ٹیوٹ برائے فوجی تاریخ

Agency overview
- Formed: 23 January 2018
- Jurisdiction: Pakistan Army
- Headquarters: 252 Aziz Bhatti Road, Chaklala, Rawalpindi, Punjab; 33°35′11.7″N 73°02′56.7″E
- Website: aimh.gov.pk

The Army Institute of Military History (AIMH) is a semi-autonomous research body of Pakistan Army with a broad outreach both within the civilian and military domain and principal institution for preserving, researching, and promoting the military history of Pakistan and the Pakistan Army.

== History ==
Army Institute of Military History was inaugurated on January 23, 2018 by Chief of Army Staff.

== Objectives ==
AIMH functions as a centre of excellence for military-historical study, maintains archives and records, conducts research-driven analytical studies, and provides military-history instruction across Army schools.

AIMH also serves as a forum for serving and retired military personnel, veterans, academics, subject-matter experts, and civil society to exchange views and contribute open-source intellectual input to the Army through collaborative programs and institutional affiliations.
