= Abdul Hafeez Pirzada =

Pakistani politician (1935–2015)

Abdul Hafeez Pirzada عبدالحفیظ پیرزادہ

12th Minister of Finance, Revenue & Economic Affairs
- In office 30 March 1977 – 5 July 1977
- President: Fazal Ilahi Chaudhry
- Prime Minister: Zulfikar Ali Bhutto
- Preceded by: Rana Hanif Khan
- Succeeded by: Ghulam Ishaq Khan

Minister of Law, Justice and Parliamentary Affairs
- In office 14 August 1973 – 30 March 1977
- President: Fazal Illahi Chaudhry
- Prime Minister: Zulfikar Ali Bhutto
- Preceded by: Mahmud Ali Kasuri
- Succeeded by: Sharifuddin Pirzada

Minister for Information
- In office 20 December 1971 – 13 August 1973
- President: Zulfikar Ali Bhutto
- Preceded by: Roedad Khan

Personal details
- Born: 24 February 1935 Sukkur, British India
- Died: 1 September 2015 (aged 80) Reading, Berkshire, England, United Kingdom
- Resting place: Sukkur, Pakistan
- Party: Pakistan People's Party (1968–1980)
- Occupation: Lawyer

Abdul Hafeez Pirzada (Urdu: عبدالحفیظ پیرزادہ; 24 February 1935 – 1 September 2015) was a Pakistani lawyer, legal theorist, and politician, who served variously as minister for information, minister for law, minister for finance, and minister for education under president and later prime minister Zulfikar Ali Bhutto from 1971 to 1977. As law minister, he is credited as a principal draftsman of the Constitution of Pakistan, adopted in 1973.

Trained as a barrister at Lincoln's Inn, Pirzada was a founding member of the Pakistan People's Party. He was elected to the National Assembly in the elections of 1970, holding several ministerial portfolios in the Bhutto government. After the government was deposed by General Zia-ul-Haq in 1977, Pirzada unsuccessfully assisted with Bhutto's defence in his criminal trial for murder. He briefly led the PPP before being imprisoned by the Zia regime, eventually leaving the party over differences with Benazir Bhutto, and retiring from politics.

Returning to private practice, Pirzada rose to Senior Advocate of the Supreme Court, becoming one of the country's leading lawyers. He died of medical complications in Royal Berkshire Hospital, Reading, on 1 September 2015. He is cited as the 'Father of the Pakistani Constitution'.

== Early life and family ==
Born in Sukkur, Sindh, British India, Abdul Hafeez Pirzada belonged to a Sindhi family, the son of former chief minister of Sindh Abdul Sattar Pirzada. His family remains active in politics: his brother Abdul Mujeeb is a member of the Pakistan Muslim League (F).

Pirzada obtained his LLB degree from Karachi University, before gaining his LLM from Sindh University. He was also awarded an MSc. in political science from the university, after focusing his thesis on the Soviet Union and the rise of communism. He then trained as a barrister at Lincoln's Inn in London, as his father and grandfather had.

Pirzada began his legal career at the Sindh High Court, known then as the West Pakistan High Court. He first met fellow lawyer Zulfikar Ali Bhutto when both were associates at Dingomal Ramchandani's law chambers in Karachi.

== PPP co-founder and federal minister ==
Pirzada was one of 30 members that co-founded the Pakistan People's Party on 30 November 1967, led by Bhutto. As Bhutto's legal counsel in cases instituted by the military regime of Ayub Khan, Pirzada successfully defended the cases, and rose to play a greater role in the party.

In the general elections of 1970, Pirzada was elected a Member of the National Assembly from Malir, polling 64,000 votes. After Bhutto was handed the presidency in 1971, he sacked incumbent Minister for Information Roedad Khan, appointing Pirzada instead. Pirzada also gained the Ministry of Education a year later.

=== Government negotiation team member ===
In 1977, Pirzada was made Finance Minister. Elected an MNA again in 1977, Pirzada was a key member of the three-member government team that negotiated, unsuccessfully, a deal with the PNA opposition grouping. During that time, he was the Finance Minister of Pakistan for a little over three months, before the PPP-led government was overthrown by military coup by (see Fair Play) General Zia-ul-Haq, then-Chief of Army Staff.

== Coup d'état and arrest ==
On 17 September 1977, Pirzada, along with Dr. Hassan and Bhutto, was arrested by the Military Police, but was released in 1978. Upon his release, Pirzada filed a petition in the Supreme Court requesting to review the petition. He then also filed a petition for the release of Dr. Mubashir Hassan but the petition was denied as the Military Police were holding Dr. Hassan on unknown criminal charges.

=== Fighting Bhutto's case ===
On 24 February, the Supreme Court denied the request of review, and so the court upheld its original decision. Pirzada then attempted to attain a commutation of Bhutto's sentence on the basis of split decision. This time, the Court decided to hear the arguments. On 28 February, the Army banned all the college text books of Dr. Hassan and forcefully lifted the books from major bookstores. On 12 March, the Supreme Court started to review the petition, and did so for the next 12 days. On 24 March, Pirzada informed Bhutto in jail that the President of Pakistan was able to change a death sentence into one of life imprisonment. Undaunted, Pirzada filed a petition to President General Zia-ul-Haq, who was serving at the time as Chief Martial Law Administrator. Pirzada asked the President to use "Section 45 of the Constitution", to commute the sentence to one of life imprisonment. However, General Zia-ul-Haq denied the application, saying the application had gone missing. Pirzada immediately went to meet Bhutto in his cell where he notified Bhutto about the application's status. After that, Pirzada held a press conference and told the media that Bhutto was prepared for death and would not file another application for mercy.

== Pro-democracy activism ==
On 1 October 1982, Pirzada was arrested for demonstrating against Zia-ul-Haq's Islamization, where he also demanded the basic rights of citizens.

== Death ==
On 1 September 2015, Pirzada died in Royal Berkshire Hospital in Reading, the United Kingdom. He was buried in the tomb of Jeay Shah, Sukkur, Pirzada family's ancestral homeland. His funeral prayers were offered by Moulana Arbab Ali Haryah Naqshbandi, the prayer leader at Jeelani Mosque in his neighbourhood.

Political offices
Preceded by Rana Mohammad Hanif Khan	Finance Minister of Pakistan; 1977	Succeeded by Ghulam Ishaq Khan
