= Mubashir Hassan =

Pakistani politician, humanist, political adviser (1922–2020)

Minister of Finance
- In office 24 December 1971 – 22 October 1974
- Prime Minister: Zulfikar Ali Bhutto
- Preceded by: Muzaffar Ali Khan
- Succeeded by: Mohammad Hanif

Personal details
- Born: Mubashir Hassan; 22 January 1922 Panipat, Punjab, British India (Present-day, Panipat, Haryana in India)
- Died: 14 March 2020 (aged 98) Lahore, Punjab, Pakistan
- Party: Pakistan Peoples Party
- Education: UET Lahore; Columbia University; Iowa State University
- Occupation: Professor, political activist
- Cabinet: Bhutto administration (1971–74)

Mubashir Hassan (Urdu: مبشر حسن; 22 January 1922 – 14 March 2020) was a Pakistani politician, humanist, political adviser, and an engineer who served in the capacity of Finance Minister in Bhutto administration from 1971 until 1974.

In 1967, Hassan co-founded the Pakistan Peoples Party, a democratic socialist political party, along with Zulfikar Ali Bhutto and J.A. Rahim. After appointed Finance Minister in Bhutto administration in 1971, his role was critical in aggressively pursuing the nationalization of private sector for establishing the planned economy while he managed the funding of the atomic bomb program when he helped established the Ministry of Science to promote and increase the scientific output of the country.

After leaving the Bhutto administration in 1974, he was appointed as the General-Secretary of the Pakistan Peoples Party, and continue his role as political adviser to Prime Minister Bhutto but become troubled when Bhutto was removed from the office, facing charges of inciting violence by the Zia administration. After retiring from politics in 1980s, Hassan joined the UET Lahore and accepted the position in teaching civil engineering, and was a vital member of the Human Rights Commission of Pakistan.

== Biography ==
Mubashir Hassan was born on 21 January 1922 in Panipat, Punjab, British India into a family that practised medicines as their profession. His mother side of family members descendant to A.H. Hali, an Urdu language poet. He was raised by his mother while his father worked for the government of Hyderabad Deccan. After his matriculation in 1938, Hassan was sent to attend the Government College University in Lahore where his elder brother was studying medicine at the King Edward Medical University but made a transfer to University of Engineering and Technology (UET).

In 1942, Hassan graduated with BSc in civil engineering at age 20, briefly employed as Subdivional Officer (SDO) at the Irrigation department in Amritsar. In 1944, Hassan secured a scholarship to study engineering in the United States, traveled to New York to attend the Columbia University, and graduated with MSc in civil engineering in 1947. Hassan returns to India immediately after the partition took place, and joined the engineering faculty of the UET Lahore. In 1953, he again went to United States to attend the doctoral program in engineering at the Iowa State University, and conferred with PhD in civil engineering in 1955. Upon returning to Pakistan, he joined the UET Lahore, eventually becoming the Chairman of the Department of Civil Engineering in subsequent years.

political philosophy began to take place in 1967, after witnessing the 1965 war with India. In 1967, Hassan published the political manifesto, "A Declaration of Unity of People", advocating for Techno- Democratic socialism in East-Pakistan, during which he was lecturing in the topic of Engineering physics at the Dhaka University.

=== Political activism ===
After gaining appreciation and popularity, Zulfikar Ali Bhutto called Hassan to West-Pakistan where at his house, the Pakistan Peoples Party was founded along with J.A. Rahim in November 1967. His wide knowledge in ranging from science and politics, Hassan became one of the closest confidants and advisers of Bhutto, and acted on behalf of Bhutto in 1970 to form a coalition government with Mujibur Rahman of Peoples League. After the 1971 Winter war, Hassan was appointed Finance Minister and helped Bhutto establish the Ministry of Science in 1972.

=== Atomic bomb project ===
His political role in atomic bomb project started in 1972, when Bhutto asked him to meet with Munir Ahmad Khan of Pakistan Atomic Energy Commission. Bhutto responded by abolishing several committees dealing with atomic energy in various ministries, and ordered Finance MinisterHassan to manage the finance of the atomic bomb project.Meanwhile, Hassan reportedly worked closely with Munir Ahmad Khan on technical and economical aspects of the atomic bomb project. He remained supportive and administrative figure in Pakistan's non-nuclear proliferation, and monitored Abdul Qadeer Khan's suspicious activities throughout 1976. However, he was soon pulled out after being warned by Bhutto, therefore, Hassan focused his attention on PAEC's efforts.

In 1974, he developed serious issues with Bhutto after Bhutto deposed Malik Meraj Khalid, a Marxist and Law Minister when Bhutto decided to expand the activities of the establishment in the government to keep an eye on Bhutto rivals. In 1974, Hassan resigned from Finance Ministry after learning of this incident, but remained loyal to Bhutto. In 1974, Bhutto finally appointed Hassan as his Science Advisor to the Prime minister Secretariat. As Director of Directorate for Science, Hassan played a significant role in the establishment of Kahuta Project, advising Bhutto on various aspects of atomic bomb project. He objected to the idea of giving the Kahuta Project's responsibilities to Corps of Engineers, but was overruled by Bhutto. However, the progress on atomic bomb project was slowed down after an intensified civil disorder began to take place, shrinking the credibility of Bhutto. Throughout 1976, Hassan made several unsuccessful attempts to bring the leadership of Pakistan National Alliance on table and he was finally arrested by Military Police in 1977. Hassan was placed in Adiala Jail with Bhutto where he spent his next seven years in prison even after Bhutto's execution.

=== Post war activities ===
Released in 1984, Hassan joined the UET Lahore's Faculty of Engineering as professor of civil engineering. In 1988, Prime minister Benazir Bhutto made an attempt to appoint him as Finance Minister but he refused to serve after Benazir had planned deregulation of industries. Although, Hassan had retired from any political activism, Hassan continued to write articles in hydraulics engineering and its extended mathematical problems. Hassan also wrote about the economic issues and remained a loyal supporter of Zulfikar Ali Bhutto and his policies. His articles were regularly published in The News International newspaper, though he was associated with the Pakistan Peoples Party (Murtaza Bhutto) since its inception. In 2011, Hassan visited his native city in India, where Hassan advocated normalisation of Indo-Pakistan relations, and maintained that:

Since 1974, Pakistan had enormously helped the people of Afghanistan in expelling the Soviet Union.... Judging by present situation, if the [United States]–[Afghanistan] axis were to invade Pakistan, India would stand by Pakistan and not with the invaders

— Hassan Mubasir

== Publications ==
=== Books and bibliography ===
- 2001, Birds of the Indus, Mubashir Hasan, Tom J. Roberts
- 2000, The Mirage of Power, Dr. Mubashir Hassan, PhD, (2000) (ISBN 0195793005)
- 1989, An Enquiry into the Bhutto Years, Dr. Mubashir Hassan
- 1986, National unity: what is to be done?, Mubashir Hasan, I. A. Rahman, A. H. Kardar
- 1977, United front for people's democracy
- 1976, Pakistan's illiterate leaders
- 1967, A Declaration of Unity of People
- 1954, On the general education of an engineer
- Shahrah e Inqilab

Government offices
| Preceded by Abdus Salam | Science Advisor to the Prime minister Secretariat; 22 October 1974 – 5 July 1977 | Succeeded by MGen Zahid A. Akbar |
| Preceded by Muzaffar Ali Khan Qizilbash | Finance Minister of Pakistan; 24 December 1971 – 22 October 1974 | Succeeded by RM Hanif Khan |
