= Sheikh Mohammad Rashid =

Pakistani political leader (1915 - 2002)

Minister of Agriculture
- In office 24 December 1971 – 22 October 1974
- Prime Minister: Zulfikar Ali Bhutto

Personal details
- Born: Sheikh Mohammad Rashid; 1915 Sheikhupura, Punjab, India
- Died: 12 September 2002 (aged 86–87) Lahore, Punjab, Pakistan
- Party: Pakistan Peoples Party
- Occupation: Political leader, political activist
- Cabinet: Bhutto administration (1971–74)

Sheikh Mohammad Rashid, (1915 – 12 September 2002) one of the founding fathers of the Pakistan Peoples Party (PPP) was regarded as an ideologue by thousands of PPP activists and was committed to a socialist cause. This had earned him a reputed nickname in Lahore as Baba-e-Socialism (Father of Socialism).

But after the PPP's return to power, following long years of the military rule in the 1980s, Sheikh Rashid had gradually felt alienated within the party, despite being its one time Senior Vice Chairman.

== Early life and career ==
Sheikh Mohammad Rashid was born in 1915 in Sheikhupura into a family of farmers and entered politics by joining the All India Muslim League in 1940. He was initially attracted by the Khaksar Tehrik but did not join it. Rashid also got involved in the Quit India Movement of the Ghadar Party led by Subhash Chandra Bose. Locally in British-ruled Punjab, he participated in the movement against the pro-British Unionist government of Khizar Hayat Khan Tiwana. In 1947 just before the independence of India and Pakistan, when religious and ethnic tensions arose and riots erupted, he formed a local "bombard group" against the Unionist government and was arrested while transporting some bombs in a tonga (a horse-driven vehicle commonly used at that time).

After the independence of Pakistan in 1947, Sheikh Rashid started his career as a lawyer but soon his socialist leanings led him to join the Azad Pakistan Party headed by Pakistan Times newspaper owner Mian Iftikharuddin. This organization had a broadly progressive programme and he was appointed its first secretary-general. True to his socialist ideals, he also led many peasants movements in Pakistan.

In 1967, he joined hands with the late Zulfikar Ali Bhutto in the formation of the Pakistan Peoples Party. He was a founding member of the party's central executive committee and later a member of the first ever PPP cabinet, initially as Health Minister and then Chairman of the Land Reforms Commission. His efforts at land reforms were said to have made him unpopular with many including some of his own land-owning party colleagues because he confiscated, as Federal Land Reforms Commission chairman, thousands of acres of land of big landowners of Pakistan regardless of what political party they belonged to. Zulfikar Ali Bhutto himself was a big landowner in Sindh. Eventually, the land reforms saw only a half-hearted implementation by the Bhutto administration. Besides Bhutto, Pakistan has been a land of too many influential feudal lords and stiff resistance was expected from them anyway to any socialist-type land reforms.

He was elected twice as member of the National Assembly of Pakistan on Pakistan Peoples' Party tickets both in the 1970 and 1977 Pakistani general elections.

Sheikh Mohammad Rashid remained close to the then Prime Minister Zulfikar Ali Bhutto, who treated him as his most senior cabinet colleague, perhaps to retain a balance between the progressive and conservative elements within the party. It was during the period of General Muhammad Zia-ul-Haq as the military ruler, that Sheikh Rashid's role as an ideologue for thousands of party workers, was boosted.

Once the Bhutto government was overthrown by General Zia-ul-Haq, Pakistan Peoples Party workers including Rashid were repressed and he spent many years in exile in Britain. Then in September 1988, General Zia died in a mysterious plane crash and attempts at restoring democracy to Pakistan were made. Benazir Bhutto returned triumphantly to Pakistan to campaign for the upcoming 1988 Pakistani general election.

== Out of tune with Benazir Bhutto ==
Sheikh Mohammad Rashid failed to get re-elected in the 1988 national election. However, the PPP's return to power in 1988 marked the beginning of his gradual alienation with Prime Minister Benazir Bhutto, who regarded his socialist ideals as being increasingly out of tune with contemporary trends. Despite ideological differences with the leadership, Sheikh Mohammad Rashid, unlike many other fellow party members, remained steadfast with his commitment to the party and never joined any other political group. He was refused a PPP party ticket to contest the 1990 elections in Pakistan.

== Death and legacy ==
Sheikh Mohammad Rashid had asthma for a long time and finally died in Lahore, aged 87, on 12 September 2002. His survivors included his wife Shakeela Khanum and his four sons from his previous marriage.

=== An uncompromising socialist ===
In the early years of Pakistan, there is an often told story of a debate on the party's drafted charter that Faiz Ahmed Faiz had drafted for the Azad Pakistan Party. Everyone accepted Faiz's draft but Sheikh Rashid. This debate took place among the founders of the party over a word which Sheikh Rashid alone wanted changed. Of course the word was about the distribution of land among the peasants. He debated the rest of the party founders over it for many hours because he wanted it expressed a certain way. All through his political career, he was recognized by his contemporaries as a defender of peasant rights.

Sheikh Mohammad Rashid was ridiculed in the early 1970s for trying to bring a generic drugs scheme to Pakistan. Although his idea was proven valid later because similar generic drug schemes were later implemented in many countries including Egypt, Bangladesh and it was endorsed by the World Health Organization (WHO). Now some people feel in Pakistan that his idea was in common public's interest.

Sheikh Rashid was among the first to advise Bhutto to accept Sheikh Mujibur Rahman's Six Point Program which later became Six point movement to achieve greater autonomy for East Pakistan. This movement finally resulted in separation of former East Pakistan becoming Bangladesh in 1971.

Books Authored by Sheikh Mohammed Rashid

1. Islam ka Mashi Nizam aur Tehrik Pakistan
