= Pakistan People's Party =

Pakistani social democratic political party

Pakistan People's Party پاکستان پیپلز پارٹی
- Abbreviation: PPP
- Chairman: Bilawal Bhutto Zardari
- Secretary-General: Humayun Akhtar Khan
- Governing body: Central Executive Committee
- Spokesperson: Nadeem Afzal Chan
- Historical chairpersons: Zulfikar Ali Bhutto; Nusrat Bhutto; Benazir Bhutto; Asif Ali Zardari (President of Pakistan)
- Leader in the Senate: Yousaf Raza Gillani (Chairman of the Senate)
- Leader in the National Assembly: Bilawal Bhutto Zardari
- Founders: Zulfikar Ali Bhutto; J. A. Rahim... and others: Ghulam Mustafa; Abdul Hafeez Pirzada; Mubashir Hassan; Hayat Sherpao; Meraj Muhammad; S. M. Rashid
- Founded: 30 November 1967 (58 years, 356 days)
- Headquarters: Parliament House, Red Zone, Islamabad
- Student wing: Peoples Students Federation
- Youth wing: Peoples Youth Organization
- Ideology: Social democracy; Third way; Islamic democracy; Big tent; Historical: Islamic socialism; Left-wing populism
- Political position: Centre to centre-left; Historical: Left-wing
- National affiliation: Pakistan Democratic Movement
- International affiliation: Socialist International
- Caucuses: Pakistan Peoples Party Parliamentarians
- Colors: Red, Black, Green
- Slogan: روٹی، کپڑا اور مکان; Roti, Kapra aur Makaan ('Bread, Clothes, and a House') چنو نئی سوچ کو; Chuno Nai Soch Ko ('Elect New Thinking')
- Senate: 26 / 96
- National Assembly: 74 / 336
- Provincial Assembly of Sindh: 110 / 168
- Provincial Assembly of Balochistan: 16 / 65
- Azad Kashmir Legislative Assembly: 14 / 53
- Gilgit-Baltistan Assembly: 14 / 33
- Provincial Assembly of Punjab: 16 / 371
- Provincial Assembly of Khyber Pakhtunkhwa: 10 / 145

Election symbol
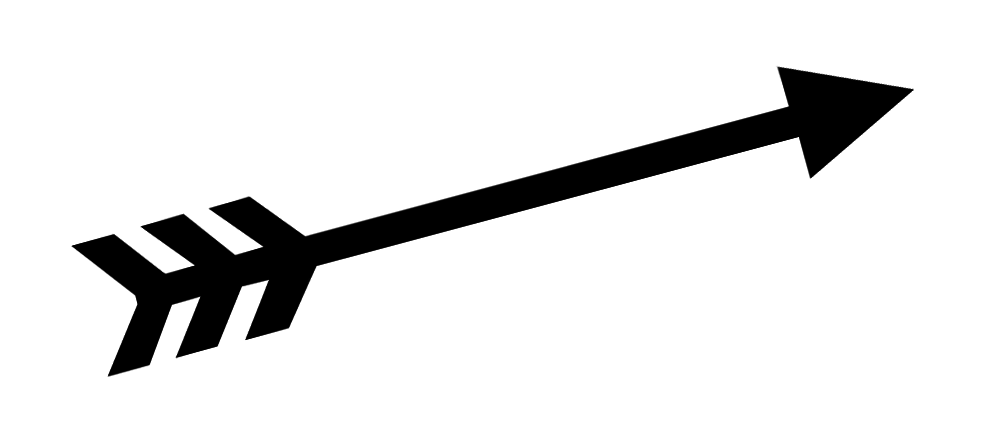
- Arrow Arrow

Party flag
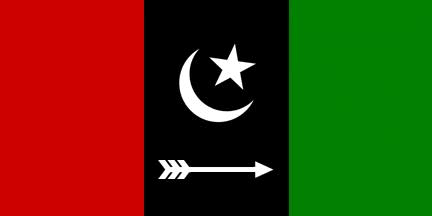
- Other flag

Website
- www.ppp.org.pk

The Pakistan People's Party (PPP) (Note: Urdu: پاکستان پیپلز پارٹی, Sindhi: پاڪستان پيپلز پارٽي) is a social democratic political party in Pakistan. It is one of the three major mainstream political parties alongside the Pakistan Muslim League (N) and the Pakistan Tehreek-e-Insaf. It currently holds the most seats in the Senate, and second-most in the National Assembly; alongside leading a majority government in Sindh, a coalition government in Balochistan and a governor's rule government in Khyber Pakhtunkhwa under Governor Faisal Kundi.

The party was founded in 1967 in Lahore, when a number of prominent left-wing politicians in the country joined hands against the presidency of Ayub Khan, under the leadership of Zulfikar Ali Bhutto. It is a member of the Socialist International. The PPP's platform is social democratic, liberal-progressive, and its stated priorities continue to include transforming Pakistan into a social-democratic state, promoting social liberal values, establishing social justice, and maintaining a strong military.

Since its foundation in 1967, it has been a major centre-left populist in the country and the party's leadership has been dominated by the members of the Bhutto-Zardari family with Bilawal Bhutto Zardari its chairman and Asif Ali Zardari as the president. Although, its power of center lies in Sindh and Balochistan, the party has been elected into leading the executive on four occasions (1977, 1988, 1993 and 2008), while on four occasions (1990, 1997, 2002 and 2013) it emerged as the largest opposition party.

In the 20th century, the party dominated the nation's politics and the two-party system in rival with the conservative Pakistan Muslim League (N) and Pakistan Tehreek-e-Insaf while opposing the status quo policies in the country. In 2013, the party struggled to appeal its political narrative in the country, and, for the first time in its history, the party failed to secure its position to become majoritarian or in opposition in 2018 and in 2024. In foreign policy, the party supports liberal internationalism while advocating for stronger ties with the United Kingdom, China, and Russia.

== History ==
=== Foundation ===
On 30 November 1967, Meraj Muhammad, a devoted communist, was able to gather left-wing leaders in the residency of Dr. Mubashir Hassan in Lahore, Punjab, that included on, J. A. Rahim, Ghulam Mustafa, A. H. Pirzada, Hayat Sherpao, and S. M. Rashid who became the founding members of the party, and announced its establishment on 1 December 1967. The convention elected Zulfikar Ali Bhutto as its first chairman when the latter was unable to challenge the leadership of the National Awami Party (NAP) from Wali Khan in 1966.

Its manifesto, titled Islam is our Religion; Democracy is our Politics; Socialism is our Economy; Power Lies with the People was written by Bengali communist J. A. Rahim, and was published on 9 December 1967. The document, which was viewed as "Marxist", declared that "Only socialism, which creates equal opportunities for all, protects [people] from exploitation, removes the barriers of class distinction, and is capable of establishing economic and social justice. Socialism is the highest expression of democracy and its logical fulfillment".

Although several of the party's founders and early supporters were drawn from Marxist and progressive circles, cultural critic Nadeem Paracha argues that the ideological orientation that came to define the PPP was shaped primarily by proponents of Islamic socialism. This current was articulated and popularized by Safdar Mir and Hanif Ramay, who was influenced by local thinkers such as Ghulam Ahmed Perwez and Khalifa Abdul Hakim as well Michel Aflaq of the Ba'ath Party in the Arab world, in a series of articles published in the Urdu literary magazine Nusrat, which presented socialism as compatible with Islamic conceptions of social justice. In these writings, Islamic socialism was defined in programmatic terms to include the abolition of feudal structures, the curbing of unregulated capitalism in favor of a regulated mixed economy, the nationalization of major banks, industries, and educational institutions, the promotion of workers' participation in management, and the strengthening of democratic institutions. These policies were framed as a modern reinterpretation of egalitarian principles associated with early Islamic governance in Mecca and Medina and with Qur'anic injunctions on social justice. Although the party's initial manifesto, drafted by J. A. Rahim, was widely characterized at the time as Marxist in tone, the leadership increasingly emphasized this Islamic socialist framework, thereby distinguishing the PPP from explicitly Marxist movements and embedding its socio-economic programme within an Islamic idiom aimed at broader popular appeal.

=== Left-wing activism and populism ===
Despite controversially winning the presidential elections held in 1965, President Ayub Khan was widely disapproved for his economic policies that many saw as the distribution of wealth to the capitalist elite at the expense of ordinary people, evidenced by the drastic increase in income inequality and poverty. The economy suffered when Ayub Khan's administration entered in the war with India in 1965 which ended up in a compromise facilitated by the former Soviet Union. In public circles, the ceasefire was widely disapproved with foreign minister Zulfikar Ali Bhutto going on to accuse Ayub Khan of "losing the war on the negotiating table", which led to his dismissal by Ayub Khan while he fiercely defended the peace agreement and called it in the best interest of the people.

Massive protests and strikes ensued against Ayub Khan, who responded by outlawing the political gatherings in the country. On 5 February 1966, Sheikh Mujibur Rahman announced his program of regional autonomy for East Bengal at a news conference.

According to Philip E. Jones, the Peoples Party had three main ideological camps: Marxists, Islamic socialists and the landed elite. In 1968, Ayub Khan celebrated his government's "Decade of Development" which was widely disapproved of when the demonstrations erupted all over the country. In the same year, spontaneous students' movements erupted throughout the country, largely due to unemployment and economic hardship which saw the beginning of the student movements in the country. AT the same time, ideological differences emerged within the NAP, which led to a major split between the pro-Russian and pro-Chinese factions. The pro-Russian faction, led by Wali Khan in West, proposed a parliamentary route to power, whereas the pro-Chinese faction led by Moulana Bhashani in East advocated for a peasant revolution to overthrow Khan's administration. The vacuum on the left generated by the disunity of the National Awami Party was effectively filled by the Pakistan Peoples Party as a united front of opposition to Ayub Khan.

Zulfiqar Ali Bhutto, being shrewder in sensing the mood of the mass movement, had embarked upon the 'need for socialism' and other radical slogans. This PPP programme connected with the masses' moods, aspirations and sentiments; the PPP became the largest party of the masses in the history of Pakistan, almost overnight. The first activists and cadres who gave the PPP a foothold and standing were from the different Maoist groups and other scattered left activists. These groups were disillusioned and frustrated by the traditional Stalinist leadership of the left.

In 1968, Pakistan Peoples Party then launched and driven the massive public-relations and membership program, beginning in the Punjab province. The program directly targeted the country's poverty-stricken masses in rural areas with the left-wing oriented slogans "Land to the Landless" proved to be popular amongst the peasants and workforce, as the party promised not only to abolish the feudalism, but also to redistribute land. The working-classes quickly flocked to the new party, believing it to be a party dedicated to the destruction of capitalism in the country. The university students and professors who often bore the brunt of Ayub Khan's presidency during his decade-long rule were promised a better future with better educational and career opportunities. Many other members of society who had felt stifled and repressed by the press-control and heavy censorship practised by the authoritarian Ayub Khan administration also joined the new party, whose manifesto also attracted the country's numerous minorities.

The massive demonstration and public protests eventually led Ayub Khan to resign from the presidency on 25 March 1969 by inviting his army commander General Yahya Khan to take-over the government. President Yahya Khan imposed the martial law in the country with a promised to hold general elections within two years.

=== 1970 general election and 1971 war ===
On 31 March 1970, the Yahya administration enacted the legal framework, which was seen as the path for future constitution but also restored the provincial autonomy in the country, ideology, and aimed for establishing a unicameral legislature as the framework also called for general elections in 1970. In response, the Peoples Party decided to hold its national conference that was held in Hala, Sindh between 1–3 July 1970. At this conference, there were two different opinions on participating in the upcoming general election with some hardliners arguing for boycotting the elections but rather adopt methods of revolutionary insurrection to take power, whereas others emphasized the importance of partaking in parliamentary democracy. In the end, the decision to participate in the elections was taken.

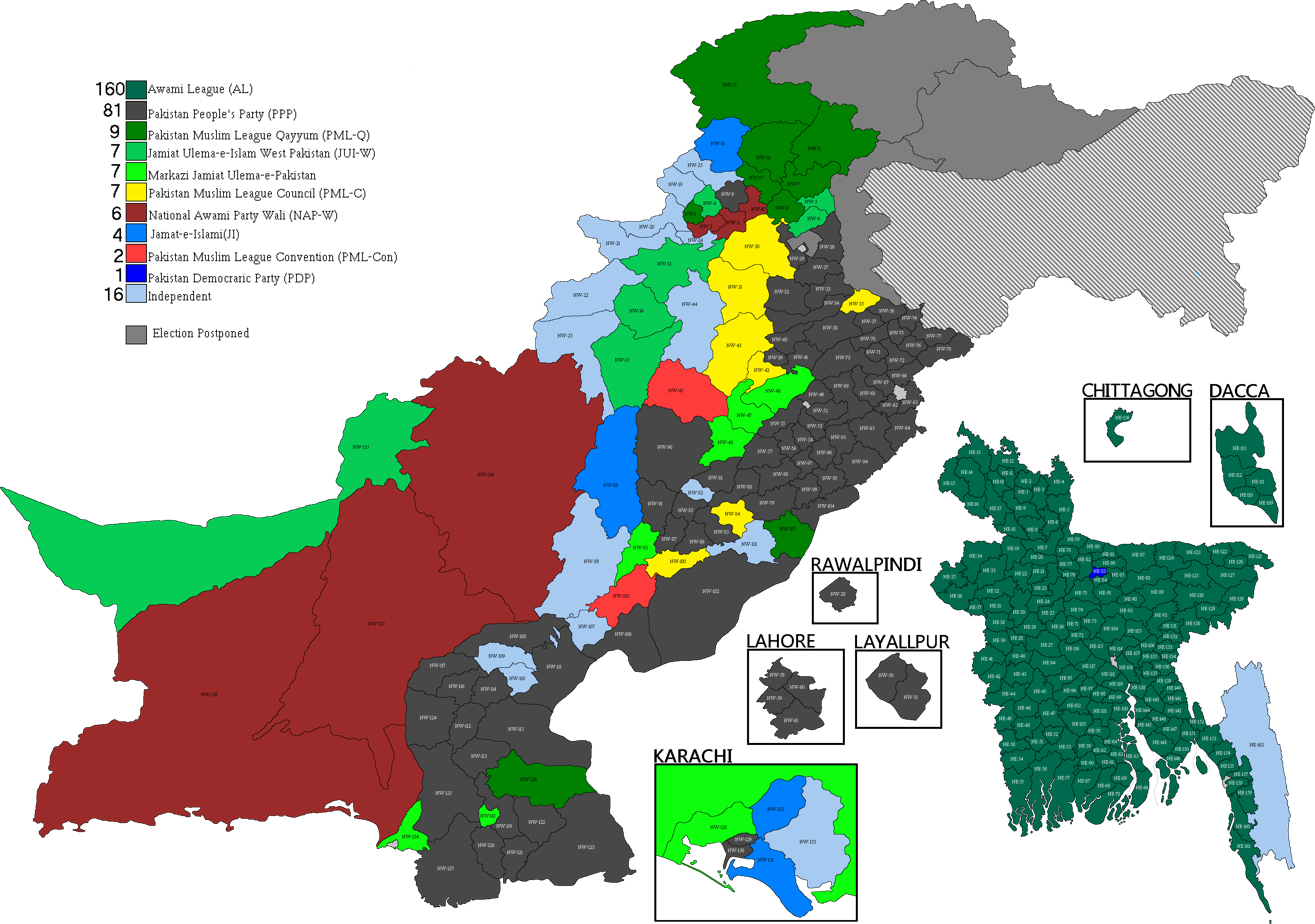
The ECP data showing results in the general elections held in 1970.

On 4 January 1970, Bhutto officially launched his electoral campaign by addressing a public meeting at Nishtar Park in Karachi and then leading a campaign in Liaquat Bagh in Rawalpindi and public speaking in parts of Khyber Pakhtunkhwa. The party published its ideology in newspapers such as Nusrat, Fatah, and Mussawat. The results of the general elections in 1970 showed that the Peoples Party won most of the seats in the four provinces shared together with the pro-Russian National Awami Party (NAP) and the conservative Pakistan Muslim League. The Peoples Party, in east, struggled to appeal its political narrative due to strong ethnic sentiments and against the identity politics led by the Awami League, which also failed to make any breakthrough or win any seats in western four provinces. Data published by the Election Commission of Pakistan (ECP) which showed that the Awami League had a clear mandate when it secured 160 seats out of the total 300 seats in the National Assembly, whereas the Peoples Party came second with 81 seats.

The Pakistan Peoples Party questioned the results and contested Awami League's mandate to form the central government as Awami League had failed to win won a single seat. To break the impasse, Bhutto proposed the continuation of the One Unit program, with two separate prime ministers for governing the wings. This proposal was rejected by Sheikh Mujibur Rahman who emphasized the implementation of Six Points for a more federal Pakistan; this proposal was rejected by Bhutto. On 3 March 1971, the two leaders, along with President General Yahya Khan, met in Dacca to try and resolve the constitutional crisis which ended up in bitter arguments on both sides. With Mujib calling for the nationwide strike, Bhutto, who feared a civil war, proposed to form a coalition with Rehman as Prime Minister and Bhutto as president, which was agreed upon by both sides.

This proposal was never made public when President Yaya Khan authorized the wide-range military operations in East and placing both Bhutto and Rehman on arrest orders in Central Jail Adiala. The news of arrest of Rehman eventually led to the liberation war and followed by the Indian intervention in East Bengal, cementing the defeat of the Pakistan Armed Forces in East and ceasefire in western front, and the independence of Bangladesh.

=== Post-war politics and reconstruction ===
Sword remained the iconic identity of PPP during 1970 to 1977

The news of Yahya administration conceding to the surrender after Indian invasion in east sparked the spontaneous protests against the military and President Yahya Khan who ultimately resigned and handed over the control of the administration to Zulfikar Ali Bhutto on 20 December 1971. The party assumed the control what remained of Pakistan— the nation was completely isolated, angered, and demoralized. After becoming president, Bhutto in his first statement to foreign media correspondents said:

Let us forget the past. We have made terrible mistakes and Pakistan is in a mess—— the worst crisis in our history. But we have been given a terrible bashing by the Western press and I ask you now to please get off our backs while we put our house in order.

In a televised media, the People's Party under Bhutto vowed to build a new Pakistan. On 2 January 1972, the People's Party announced a policy measure program of nationalization of industrial sector, including iron and steel, heavy engineering firms, petrochemicals, cement and public utilities. A new labor policy was announced increasing the power of trade unions. Despite the core of the leadership of the party came from feudal background, the People's Party announced reforms limiting land ownership and the government take-over of more than a million acres to distribute to landless peasants.

More than 2,000 civil servants were dismissed on charges of corruption and those who protested against the policies. On foreign front, People's Party supported President Bhutto of negotiating the return of more than 93,000 prisoners of war and settlement with India that brought the areas occupied by India under the management of Pakistani government. Development of the nuclear weapons program also took place under the Bhutto's administration as part of the defense strategy to prevent foreign invasions on 20 January 1972. In 1972, the People's Party had to address the labor unrest when the steel workers intensified their demands and the whole country engulfed with periodic lockouts and encirclement of industries. Among them notable struggles were the emergence of a worker-led court under Abdur Rehman in Kot Lakhpat.

In 1973, the People's Party spearheaded the writings and the framework of the Constitution that placed the country's political structure towards the parliamentary democracy. In the Peoples Party's first budget of 1972–73, the healthcare and education were nationalized, with a record 42.3 percent of the total budget being allocated for the affordable healthcare and education program.

On 10 April 1973, the People's Party spearheaded the efforts to promulgated the Constitution which was approved by the National Assembly and the Senate, and it came into effect from 14 August 1973, the day Bhutto elected as the Prime Minister of Pakistan. The People's Party initiated education reforms that expanded the school network to slums and small villages, creating basic health facilities, land reforms and housing schemes. However, these programs were affected by the global recession, fueled by the oil crises, and the failure of reforms resulted into rising inflation in 1974. The letter of credit of Pakistan was rejected by International Monetary Fund and World Bank and a massive capital flight was seen from the country to Eastern Europe. Dr Mubashar Hassan, then-finance minister under Bhutto's administration wrote in a note to core of the leadership of the People's Party:

"We have been in office for more than six months. Many decisions have been taken but a growing implementation gap is becoming visible. Once the implementation gap sets in, the decline begins. We came to abolish the abominable status quo but the status quo is very much present..."

On the foreign policy, the People's Party moved towards building closer ties with the People's Republic of China, with Bhutto successfully negotiating an aid package worth $300 million for Pakistan and also writing off loans amounting to over $110 million.

In 1975–76, the serious issues began to emerge within the party's ranks, when Bhutto decided to utilize the state machinery to keep an eye on the activities of the Pakistan National Alliance– a rightwing conservative alliance led by the Pakistan Muslim League. The People's Party direction was geared towards centre-left when leftwing intellectuals – such as Malik Meraj Khalid, a law minister under Bhutto's administration, Mubashir Hassan, finance minister in Bhutto's administration– were asked to resign from their respective assignments. In September 1974, under pressure from religious organizations, the People's Party agreed on drafting and passing the constitutional amendment declaring the Ahmadiyya community to be non-Muslim. In 1976, the People's Party supported the authorization of the military operation in the Balochistan and dismissed the key ally, the National Awami Party, government by imposing the governor's rule in the province as a wider policy to fight against the feudalism in the province.

=== Redemption and two-party system ===
In 1977, the Pakistan People's Party led by Bhutto secured the landslide victory in general election over the conservative Pakistan National Alliance but the opposition refused and denied the election results. Massive demonstration and protests broke out in the conservative strongholds of the country that forced the party to negotiate with the opposition and offered to hold another set of elections, also in 1977. although, in 1974, he had banned alcohol. Any attempts by the party to settle the issue with the opposition failed which led to General Muhammad Zia-ul-Haq, the army chief at that time, imposed a martial law to ensure security in the country in 1977.

From 1979 to 1988, the People's Party was a target of the various counterintelligence operations and was a proponent of organizing and leading the Movement for the Restoration of Democracy (MRD) under its elected chairperson Benazir Bhutto.

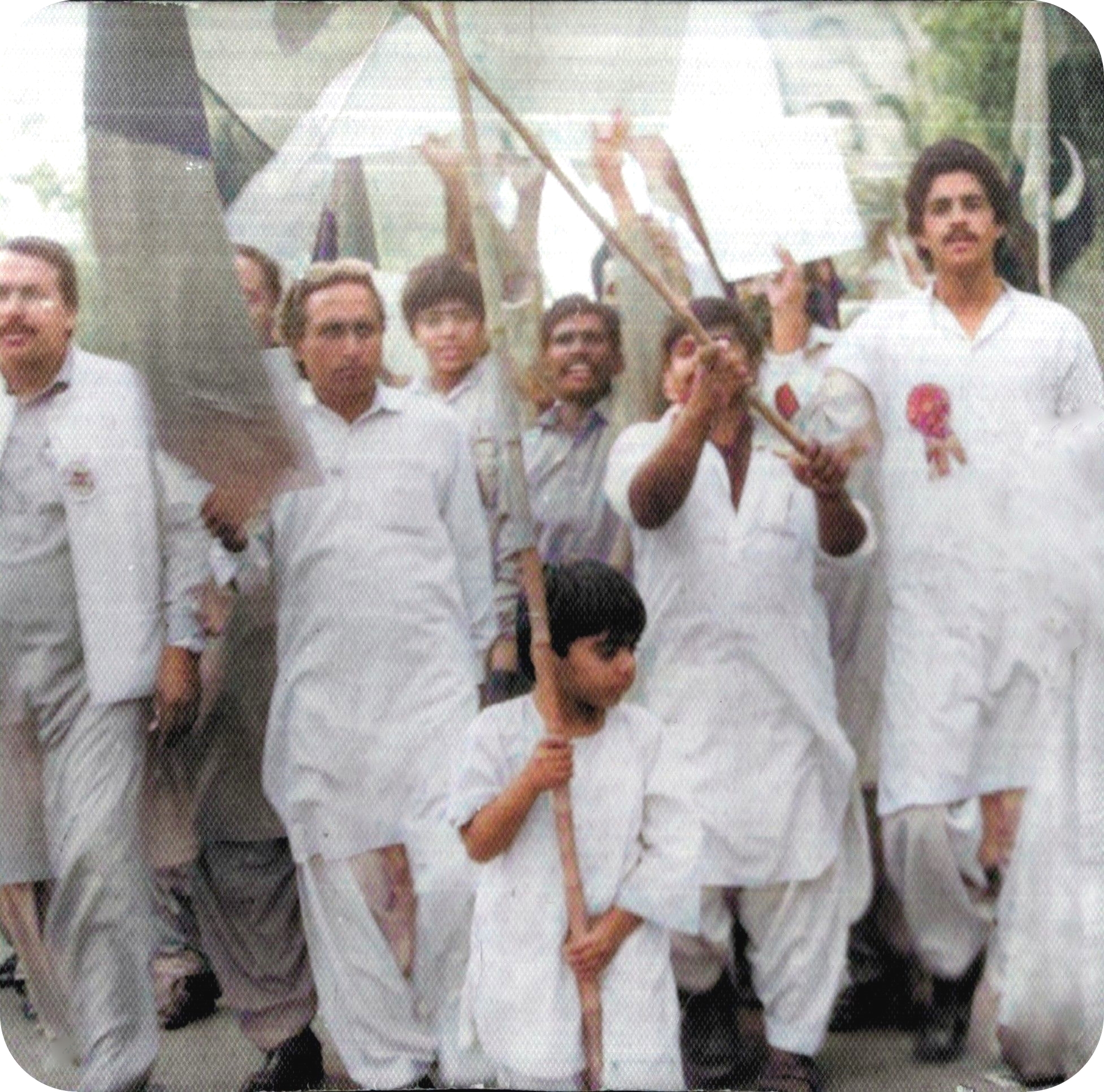
The Peoples Party holding and leading an MRD protest against General Zia's martial law shortly in 1977.

The Peoples Party spearheaded the pro-democratic movement in the country under Benazir Bhutto's direction against the martial law and boycotted the general elections in 1985.

After the death of General Zia-ul-Haq in 1988, the People's Party returned and assumed the control of the executive government after voted in majority during the general elections, with Benazir Bhutto becoming the first female head of government in the Muslim world. The issues relating to the economic recession, national security, industrial nationalization, and administration guidance that differs from the President Ishaq Khan, eventually led to the dismissal of the People's Party's government in 1990. The part lost the general election in 1990, which was said and later proved in court inquiries to be heavily rigged in favor of conservative alliance led by Fida Mohammad. In 2012, the Supreme Court of Pakistan declared this election "rigged in favor" of the Pakistan Muslim League.

In 1993, the People's Party secured the majority in the general election, forming an unusual coalition with fundamentalist JUI(F) and the Awami National Party (ANP). The party dominated the two-party system facing the rival Pakistan Muslim League (N) and Pakistan Tehreek-e-Insaf on a conservative and status quo platform. The party under Benazir Bhutto faced the issues relating to the economic recession, war in Afghanistan on the western front, and identity politics in Karachi, Sindh. The party also suffered with internal factions mainly in three parliamentary groups: the Bhuttoists, the Parliamentarians and the Sherpaoists, with Bhuttoism becoming the most influential and powerful in Sindh and Balochistan. Internal opposition and disapproval of Asif Zardari and Benazir Bhutto's policies by her brother Murtaza Bhutto created a rift in their relations. Murtaza Bhutto was assassinated in a police shootout with the Sindh Police in 1996, with many pointing the finger of blame at his sister and her husband.

The assassination of Bhutto in a police shootout damaged the credibility of the party in its stronghold and was later dismissed by dismissed by the party's own elected President Farooq Leghari in September 1996. From 1996 to 2006, the People's Party worked on strengthening its vote bank in the rural areas of Sindh and eventually reached an understanding with the Pakistan Muslim League(N) in leading the Alliance for Restoration of Democracy (ARD) that effectively opposed the military-backed government of President Pervez Musharraf.

=== 21st century and current affairs ===
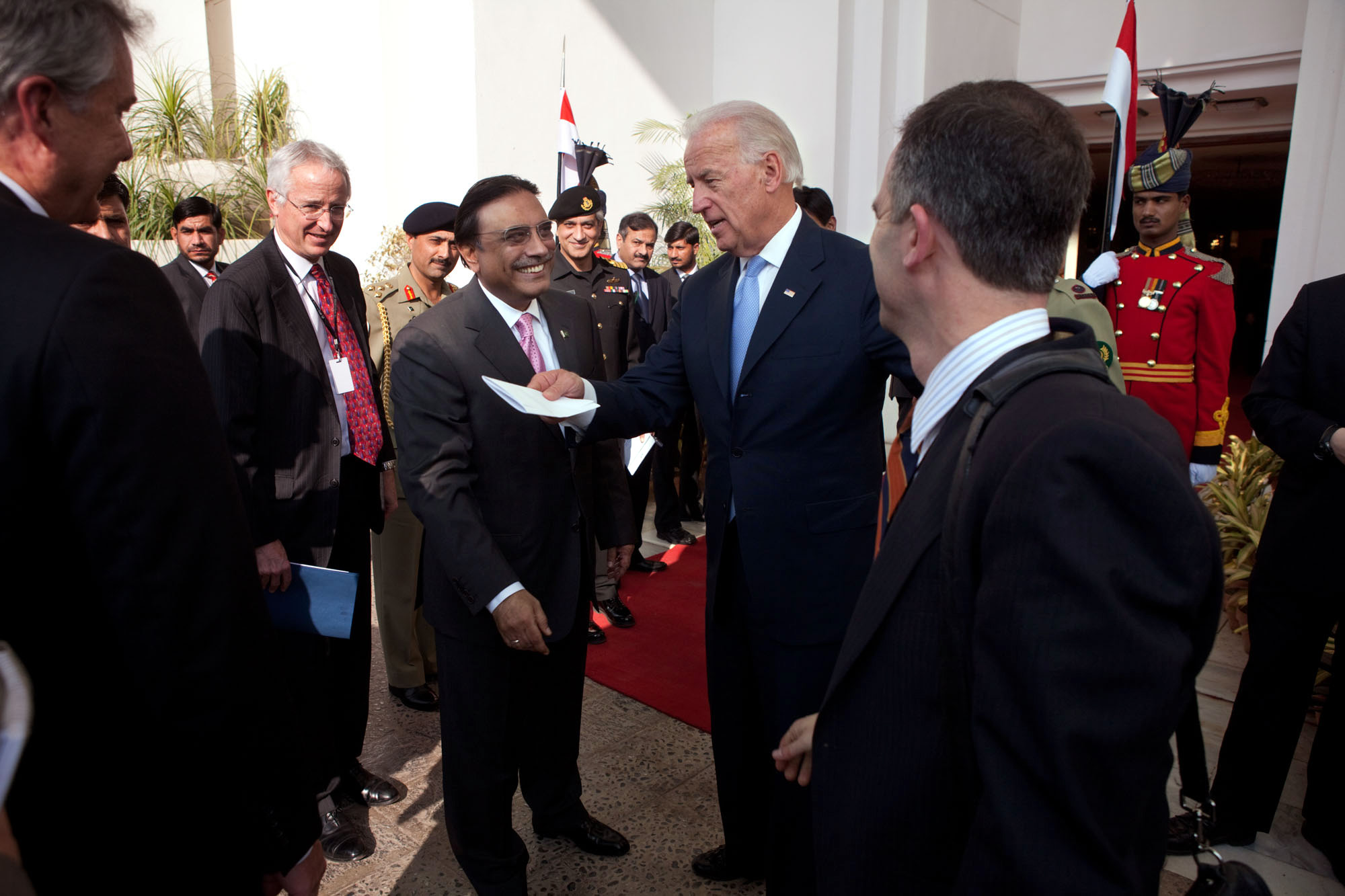
American Vice President and Democratic Party leader Joe Biden meeting with the integral leadership of the PPP in Islamabad, 2011

In 2007, the party faced the leadership crises when its presiding leader, Benazir Bhutto, was assassinated on 27 December 2007 but the party won the majority to control the executive after the general elections held in 2008. Initially reaching a compromise with its rival Pakistan Muslim League (N) and Pakistan Tehreek-e-Insaf the party spearheaded the efforts to impeach President Pervez Musharraf who later resigned. During this time, the party nominated Yousaf Raza Gillani for the premiership and Asif Ali Zardari for the presidency while forming a coalition alliance with Pakistan Muslim League (Q) in Punjab, Awami National Party in Khyber-Pakhtunkhwa, JUI(F) in Balochistan and Muttahida Qaumi Movement in Sindh. While on other hand, the Peoples Party claimed the exclusive mandate in Gilgit-Baltistan and Kashmir.

In 2010, President Zardari voluntarily transferred the powers and control of the executive Prime Minister's Secretariat which was ratified through the passage of the eighteenth amendment to the constitution as part of country's road to parliamentary democracy. In growing criticism on tackling foreign-bound terrorism from west, corruption, energy crises, and economic stagflation, the party struggled to project its overall political narratives but managed to maintain a large vote bank in deeper Sindh, Balochistan, and southern skirts of Punjab.

According to The Economist in 2017, the party "has become irrelevant outside their home province of Sindh."

== Electoral history ==
=== National Assembly elections ===
Election	Leader	Votes	%	Seats	+/–	Result
1970	Zulfikar Ali Bhutto	6,148,923	18.63%	86 / 313	New	Government
1977	Zulfikar Ali Bhutto	10,093,868	59.74%	171 / 216	▲85	Martial law in effect
1985	Nusrat Bhutto	–	Non-participant	–		–
1988	Benazir Bhutto	7,546,561	37.66%	93 / 237	▲93	Government
1990	Benazir Bhutto	7,796,238	36.02%	44 / 217	▼49	Opposition
1993	Benazir Bhutto	7,578,635	37.00%	89 / 217	▲45	Government
1997	Benazir Bhutto	4,152,209	21.29%	18 / 217	▼71	Opposition
2002	Ameen Faheem	7,616,033	26.05%	79 / 342	▲61	Opposition
2008	Benazir Bhutto (assassinated whilst campaigning); Asif Ali Zardari	10,666,548	30.77%	116 / 342	▲37	Government
2013	Asif Ali Zardari	6,911,218	15.23%	42 / 342	▼74	Opposition
2018	Bilawal Bhutto Zardari	6,924,356	13.03%	54 / 342	▲12	Opposition (till 11 April 2022)
2018	Bilawal Bhutto Zardari	6,924,356	13.03%	54 / 342	▲12	Coalition partner (from 11 April 2022)
2024	Bilawal Bhutto Zardari	8,244,944	13.92%	68 / 312	▲14	Coalition partner

=== Senate of Pakistan Elections ===
Election	Party chairperson	Votes	%	Seats	+/–	Government
2006	Ameen Faheem	-	-	5 / 104	▲-	Opposition
2009	Asif Ali Zardari	-	-	27 / 104	▲22	Government
2012	Asif Ali Zardari	-	-	41 / 104	▲14	Government
2015	Asif Ali Zardari	-	-	27 / 104	▼14	Opposition
2018	Bilawal Bhutto Zardari	-	-	21 / 104	▼6	Opposition
2021	Bilawal Bhutto Zardari	-	-	21 / 100	-	Opposition / Government

=== Sindh Assembly elections ===
Election	Party chairperson	Votes	%	Seats	+/–	Government
2002	Ameen Faheem	2,115,472	35.05%	67 / 168	▲ -	Opposition
2008	Benazir Bhutto (assassinated whilst campaigning); Asif Ali Zardari	3,597,275	41.94%	92 / 168	▲25	Government
2013	Asif Ali Zardari	3,209,686	32.63%	91 / 168	▼1	Government
2018	Bilawal Bhutto Zardari	3,853,081	40.03%	99 / 168	▲8	Government
2024	Bilawal Bhutto Zardari	5,228,678	46.11%	115 / 168	▲16	Government

=== Punjab Assembly elections ===
Election	Party chairperson	Votes	%	Seats	+/–	Government
2002	Ameen Faheem	4,145,106	22.48%	79 / 371	−	Opposition
2008	Benazir Bhutto (assassinated whilst campaigning); Asif Ali Zardari	5,565,743	26.89%	103 / 371	▲24	Coalition Government * Later Opposition
2013	Asif Ali Zardari	2,464,812	8.84%	8 / 371	▼99	Opposition
2018	Bilawal Bhutto Zardari	1,781,330	5.38%	7 / 371	▼1	Opposition
2024	Bilawal Bhutto Zardari	TBD	TBD	17 / 371	▲10	Opposition
In the 2008 elections, the PML (N) and the PPP formed a coalition government, with PML (N) as the senior party and Shehbaz Sharif as Chief Minister of Punjab. However, in 2011, the PPP was expelled from this coalition due to corruption allegations.

=== Khyber Pakhtunkhwa Assembly elections ===
Election	Party chairperson	Votes	%	Seats	+/–	Government
2002 (NWFP)	Ameen Faheem	270,468	9%	8 / 99	▲8	Opposition
2008 (NWFP)	Benazir Bhutto (assassinated whilst campaigning); Asif Ali Zardari	563,057	16.49%	17 / 99	▲9	Coalition Government
2013	Asif Ali Zardari	473,358	8.82%	3 / 99	▼14	Opposition
2018	Bilawal Bhutto Zardari	596,816	9.04%	3 / 99	−	Opposition
2024	Bilawal Bhutto Zardari	TBD	TBD	11 / 124	▲8	Opposition

=== Azad Kashmir Legislative Assembly Elections ===
Election	Party Chairperson	Votes	%	Seats	+/–	Government
2011	Asif Ali Zardari	-	-	21 / 49	▲ -	Government
2016	Asif Ali Zardari	352,742	21.2%	3 / 49	▼18	Opposition
2021	Bilawal Bhutto Zardari	349,895	18.28%	11 / 53	▲8	Opposition

=== Gilgit-Baltistan Assembly Elections ===
Election	Party Chairperson	Votes	%	Seats	+/–	Government
2009	Asif Ali Zardari	72,851	33.08%	20 / 33	▲20	Government
2015	Asif Ali Zardari	69,216	18.26%	1 / 33	▼19	Opposition
2020	Bilawal Bhutto Zardari	-	-	5 / 33	▲4	Opposition

== Notable leadership ==
The first socialist and democratic convention attended by the leading 67 left-wing intellectuals who appointed Zulfikar Ali Bhutto as the first and founding chair of the Pakistan Peoples Party. After his execution, the senior party leadership handed over the chairmanship of the party to his wife, Nusrat Bhutto, and held the position into the 1980s. In 1982, Nusrat Bhutto, ill with cancer, was given permission to leave Pakistan for medical treatment and remained abroad for several years. At that point her daughter, Benazir Bhutto, became acting head of the party while Nusrat technically remained its chairman and was referred to as such as late as September 1983. By January 1984, Benazir was being referred to as the party's chairman and subsequently secured the legal appointment by the senior leadership of Central Executive Committee at the convention held in 1984. She had been elected chairperson for life, which she remained until her assassination on 27 December 2007. Her nineteen-year-old son, Bilawal Bhutto Zardari and his father Asif Ali Zardari were appointed party co-chairmen after assassination of Benazir Bhutto on 30 December 2007.

=== List of party's presidents ===
No.	Presidents	Year	Duration	Presidential elections
1	Zulfikar Ali Bhutto	1971–1973	1 year, 7 months, 25 days	20 December 1971
2	Fazal Ilahi Chaudhry	1973–1978	5 years, 1 month, 3 days	14 August 1973
3	Farooq Leghari	1993–1997	4 years, 1 month, 19 days	14 November 1993
4	Asif Ali Zardari	2008–2013	5 years	6 September 2008
4	Asif Ali Zardari	2024–	Incumbent	9 March 2024

=== List of party's prime ministers ===
No.	Prime ministers	Year	Duration	Elections
1	Zulfikar Ali Bhutto	1973–1977	3 years, 10 months, 21 days	–
2	Benazir Bhutto	1988–1990; 1993–1996	4 years, 8 months, 21 days	1988, 1993
3	Yousaf Raza Gillani	2008–2012	4 years, 2 months, 25 days	2008
4	Raja Pervaiz Ashraf	2012–2013	9 months, 2 days,	–

== Current structure and composition ==
The Central Executive Committee of the Pakistan Peoples Party of Pakistan serves as party's highest leadership, and apex governing authority, and is primarily responsible for promoting Peoples Party activities, promotion, media campaigning, welfare distribution, public policy and works. The CEC is the supreme parliamentary body in charge of setting out strategies and positions during and after elections. The CEC is currently chaired by Asif Ali Zardari, assisted by additional vice-chairmen, including all the major office bearers of the party. However, the CEC is focused on election campaigning and organizational strategy during the national parliamentary elections, overseeing the media works, ideological promotion, and the foreign policy. The public works, welfare distribution are partly managed at the municipal unit level up to the federal level, which supervise and give legal authority for such works.

The PPP-Young Organization is a youth-led party organisation that attempts to mobilise the youth for Peoples Party candidates for the Youth Parliament. The group's Trotskyist-Marxist wing, "The Struggle", which is internationally affiliated with International Marxist Tendency (IMT) pursues an entryist strategy by working inside party's student wing, the Peoples Students, a student-outreach organization with the goal of training and engaging the new generation of the Pakistan Peoples Party. The Peoples Party also has an active military-street wing, the Peoples' Aman Committee, controversially affiliated with the Pakistan Peoples Party.

Nationally, each province and territory has a provisional committee, made up of elected committee members as well as ex-officio committee members who elect its presidents. The local committees often coordinate campaign activities within their jurisdiction, oversee local conventions, and in some cases primaries or caucuses, and may have a role in nominating candidates for elected office under state law. All administration, campaign, and party policies required complete permission from the CEC's co-chairman and the vice-chairmen.

=== Ideology ===
In its inception, the notable communists from the Communist Party and socialists of the defunct Socialist Party gathered to form the Peoples Party in 1967 by electing Zulfikar Ali Bhutto its first chairman. The Pakistan Peoples Party's leftist program remains far more successful and integrated in the civil society than the Communist Party.

Since then, the Peoples Party has been a leading proponent of democratic socialism with the mainstream agenda of social democracy, favouring semi-secular and semi-Islamic socialist principles. Historically, the Peoples Party favoured financially stable farmers, industrial labour unions and the middle-class. The Peoples Party rejected far-left politics and ultra-leftism, supporting unregulated business and finance, and laissez-faire capitalism, after which it was no longer widely viewed as a socialist or social-democratic party, as its economic policies swung dramatically to the right-wing, embracing economic neoliberalism and unfettered capitalism and privatisation of publicly owned institutions, favouring partial income taxes.

Despite its democratic-socialist ideas, the Peoples Party never actually allied with the Soviet Union, with the Communist Party of Pakistan remaining one of its major rivals. The Peoples Party has been criticised by various socialists such as Fahad Rizwan who accused the Peoples Party of opportunism. Recently, the Peoples Party has adopted privatisation and small-scale nationalisation policies, with centrist economic and socially progressive agendas.

Basic, enshrined principles of PPP include "Islam [as] our Faith. Democracy is our Politics. Socialism is our Economy. All Power to the People".

=== Issues involving foreign policy ===
Relations with China, Russia, Iran and Turkey, are the central and the strongest proponents of the Peoples Party's foreign policy. Under Zulfikar Ali Bhutto, Pakistan built closer ties with Soviet Union, China, and Iran, but under Benazir Bhutto, the foreign policy was revised after taking shifts to centre-right policies. Earlier in the 1970s, the Peoples Party faced a "secret" cold war with the United States, but then suffered a US-backed coup in 1977. On the other hand, Anti-Americanism among most PPP workers and its student wing grew twofold after Zulfikar Ali Bhutto's execution at the hands of the pro-American Ziaul Haq dictatorship, the party's new chairperson, Benazir Bhutto, advised her party to concentrate on the removal of Zia alone. She also adopted Nawaz Sharif's conservative privatisation policies in order to secure funding from the United States and the World Bank, but received a harsh opposition from within the party. Throughout the 1980s, the party's credibility was damaged by the United States who "keenly sabotaged" any of its efforts and organizational establishment in the dense areas of country. Although PPP leader Bilawal Bhutto Zardari said he did not want to choose one side in the 21st century China-US strategic competition, Hina Rabbani Khar argues that the instinct to preserve Pakistan's partnership with the United States would ultimately sacrifice the full benefits of the country's "real strategic" partnership with China.

=== Academia ===
The Pakistan Peoples Party through Zulfikar Ali Bhutto proudly receives all credit for launching the atomic bomb project in 1972, public ceremonies are held on Youm-e-Takbir (lit. 'Day of Greatness') to commemorate the political services of Zulfikar Ali Bhutto who established the program.

In 1976, Murtaza Bhutto graduated from Harvard University, Bhutto graduated with his thesis entitled "Modicum of Harmony". His thesis dealt with the spread of nuclear weapons in general, and the implications of India's nuclear weapons on Pakistan in particular. Murtaza went on to Christ Church, Oxford, his father's alma mater, for a three-year course to read for an MLit degree. Bhutto submitted his master thesis, containing a vast argumentative work on Nuclear strategic studies, where he advocated for Pakistan's approach to develop its nuclear deterrence program to counter Indian nuclear program.

Since its establishment, the Peoples Party has produced prolific scientists-turned technocrats, including Farhatullah Babar, Mubashir Hassan, and the senior academic scientists who played a role in building the atomic bomb. The Peoples Party member's notably provided their public support to Abdul Qadeer Khan who had been forced to attend the military debriefings by General Pervez Musharraf in 2004. In August 2012, after years of negligence, the peoples party made its effort to bestowed and award Munir Ahmad Khan the highest state honor, the Nishan-e-Imtiaz, as a gesture of political rehabilitation; the honor was publicly presented by President Asif Ali Zardari in a public ceremony.

In 1995–1996, the Peoples Party under Benazir Bhutto's era opened computer literacy centres to provide the public with access to computers and technology. In 1990, they made Pakistan the first Muslim country to launch a satellite, Badr-I. They are also responsible for establishing, nurturing, and funding the missile's programs, such as Ghauri and Shaheen in the 1990s. As part of the science policy, they established the Pakistan Science Foundation in 1973 and helped establish the Pakistan Academy of Letters in 1976. In 1996, Benazir Bhutto established SZABIST at Karachi to become a leading institution of science and technology and appointed academic Dr. Javaid Laghari as its first president, who later was also elected Senator from Sindh on a technocrat seat and eventually Chairman HEC leading a revolution of reforms in higher education in South Asia.

=== Ideology and platform ===
PPP's stated objectives include:

- Ensuring merit-based representation of marginalized regions and communities.
- Enacting legal and electoral reforms, such as joined the politicians from contesting multiple seat the elections.
- Implementing public welfare programs on organization, women, farmers, clean drinking water, clean road, transport, and healthcare.

== Challenges and controversies ==
=== "Losing the left" and post-secularism ===
Since the 1990s, the Peoples Party has been under intense criticism, both from its own members and the other leftists in the country, notably due to the charges of large-scale corruptions. The leading leftist, Nadeem Paracha, has asserted that since 1977, the Peoples Party's manifesto has been transformed into a centre-right platform, despite that during the 1977 parliamentary elections, the Peoples Party's manifesto did not mention socialism. During the 1973–75, the Peoples Party's radical ultra-left and communist wings led by Mirage Khalid and the Maoist wings under Khalid Syed were purged by the Peoples Party to ensure the political support of the powerful Sindh's feudal lords and Punjab's landed elite, with Paracha claiming the Peoples Party has "lost the left".

Leading left-wing journalist Mehdi Hasan has remarked that the Peoples Party is "not a secular party", firstly citing its support of declaring Ahmadiyya community as non-Muslims through the second constitutional amendment, secondly for banning the use of liquor, and thirdly for the Peoples Party declaring Friday as a holiday to win the support of religious elements.

=== Kashmir cause ===
The chairman of PPP Bilawal Bhutto Zardari led a convention on 19 September 2014 in Multan, Punjab, where he reportedly quoted: "the [PPP] would take back entire Kashmir for his country."

Bhutto emphasized on his last part of the speech: "I will take back Kashmir, all of it, and I will not leave behind a single inch of it because like the other provinces, it belongs to Pakistan. He pledged to continue supporting Kashmiri freedom struggle morally and diplomatically...(.)".

=== Internal opposition and factionalism ===
Since the 1990s, the factionalism has grown in the party when Murtaza Bhutto returned to Pakistan. Disagreeing with Benazir and Asif Ali Zardari's political philosophy brewing the party, Murtaza Bhutto split and formed the more powerful yet more leaning towards left wing faction, Bhuttoist in 1995. Confrontation with Benazir Bhutto in 1999 over the party guidance, Aftab Sherpao splits from the party and forming the Pakistan Peoples Party (Sherpaoist)—a more reformist with libertarian agenda.

Factionalism continued in 2011 when PPP sacked Mahmood Qureshi over the Raymond Davis incident in Lahore. Qureshi later defected to PTI. Another leftist leader, Malik Ali Khan also resigned from the Peoples Party, saying that he "did not agree with how President Zardari was leading the party particularly with regards to an alliance with centre-right PML (Q) and the foreign policy."

In 2012, the PPP's powerful leader, Zulfiqar Mirza, quit from the party despite urgings amidst disagreement with Asif Zardari's leadership and policies with regards to dealings with the liberal MQM in Sindh. Reasoning with their isolation, the socialist politicians felt that the party had now moved away from the original ideas it was founded on by Zulfikar Ali Bhutto in 1967. In 2014, Labour leader, Safdar Ali Abbasi, formed the Workers faction amid disagreement with party's fiscal policy.

=== Defection in PPP: The launch of Pakistan Peoples Party Parliamentarian-Patriots (PPPPP) ===
The Pakistan Peoples Party Parliamentarian-Patriots (PPPPP) was launched in Lahore in the year 2002 as a 'forward bloc' that broke away from the PPP to back the Pakistan Muslim League Quaid-e-Azam (PML-Q) transforming itself into Pakistan's newest party at that time. The leader of the rebel group was Faisal Saleh Hayat. In January 2017, Former federal minister Syed Faisal Saleh Hayat joined the Pakistan Peoples Party on Monday, more than 14 years after being elected on the PPP ticket in 2002, bringing an end to the PPPPP.

== See also ==
- Bhuttoism and Sindh
  - Roti Kapada Aur Makaan
- Current and former breakaway factions of the PPP
  - Pakistan Peoples Party (Shaheed Bhutto)
  - Qaumi Watan Party, formerly Pakistan Peoples Party (Sherpao)
  - Pakistan Peoples Party (Parliamentarians)
  - Pakistan Peoples Party (Workers)
- Political realism
- Socialism in Pakistan
- List of political parties in Pakistan
- List of Islamic political parties
