= Shafiq Zia =

First Lady of Pakistan (1931–1996)

Begum Shafiq Zia
- شفیق ضیاء
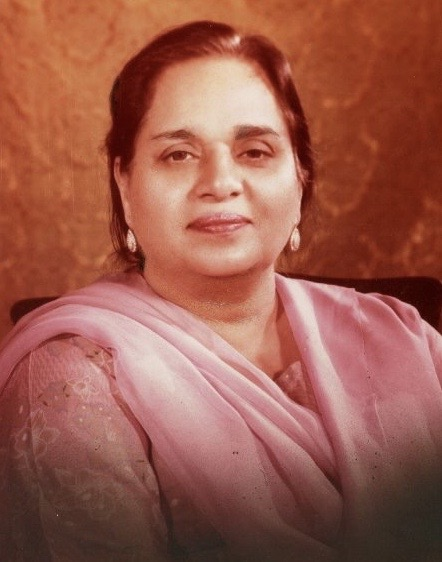
- Official portrait, 1985

First Lady of Pakistan
- In office 16 September 1978 – 17 August 1988
- President: Mohammad Zia-ul-Haq
- Preceded by: Nusrat Bhutto
- Succeeded by: Shamim Khan

Personal details
- Born: Shafiq Jahan; 21 September 1931 Kampala, Protectorate of Uganda
- Died: 5 January 1996 (aged 64) London, England
- Spouse: Muhammad Zia-ul-Haq (m. 1950; died 1988)
- Children: 5 (including Ijaz-ul-Haq and Zain Zia)
- Occupation: Humanitarian

Begum Shafiq Zia (née Jahan; 21 September 1931 – 5 January 1996) was a Pakistani public figure, humanitarian, and social worker who served as the First Lady of Pakistan from 1978 until her husband's death in a plane crash in 1988. As First Lady, her work highlighted the lives of people with disabilities and addressed the crisis of drug addiction in Pakistan.

Born as Shafiq Jahan into a family of Punjabi descent in Uganda under colonial rule, she moved to Pakistan after the Partition of British India upon her marriage to Muhammad Zia-ul-Haq. Zia, who was trained at the Indian Military Academy and Fort Leavenworth, Kansas, served in the British Indian Army during the second world war and joined the Pakistan Army in 1947. In 1977, he overthrew Prime Minister Zulfikar Ali Bhutto in a coup nicknamed Operation Fairplay. Begum Zia and Zia-ul-Haq were married for 38 years, and raised five children. Their eldest son Ijaz-ul-Haq became a politician in his own right following the death of his father, and later held government roles under the administrations of former Prime Minister Nawaz Sharif and former President Pervez Musharraf. Since 2010, Ijaz has been leader of the Pakistan Muslim League – Zia, a party named after Begum Zia's husband.

After her time as first lady was cut short after Zia-ul-Haq's death, she was rarely seen in the public eye. Her last major appearance was at the state funeral of her husband. Begum Zia lived between London and Pakistan with a small income and support from her children as the successive administration under Prime Minister Benazir Bhutto revoked her pension and privileges as the wife of a former President. She lived a private life until her death in 1996, and was survived by her five children. Her tenure made her the longest-serving uninterrupted first lady in Pakistani history.

== Early life and family ==
Begum Zia was born in 1931 in Kampala, Uganda, to a family of Punjabi descent; she moved to Pakistan after the partition of India, and married General Zia-ul-Haq on 10 August 1950 in Lahore. The couple went on to have five children. Shafiq was eight years younger than her husband and related to him on her maternal side. Her father, a medical doctor who lived and worked in Kampala, had taken leave at the time and was in Pakistan so that he could arrange the marriages of both his daughters.

== First Lady (1978–1988) ==
Begum Zia pictured in 1976

After the 1977 coup and her husband's assumption of the presidency in 1978, Zia became first lady. Over the next decade, she accompanied her husband on several overseas trips, including a state visit to the United States in 1982.

Upon assuming the presidency in 1978, the Zia family continued residing at the Army House in Rawalpindi, but hosted official functions and state dinners at the newly-completed Aiwan-i-Sadr. Begum Zia's work as First Lady of Pakistan focused on domestic initiatives pertaining to the welfare of disabled persons and the problems of drug addiction and abuse among young people. In 1981, the Zia government passed the Disabled Persons' (Employment and Rehabilitation) Ordinance, which created national and provincial councils to formulate policy for the employment and welfare of those with disabilities, established training centres, set employment quotas and called for the creation of a federal fund for the disbursement of stipends and scholarships for disabled persons. Begum and President Zia's own child, youngest daughter Zain, was born with speech and hearing disabilities.

Following the publication of an unflattering photograph of Begum Zia, newspapers were instructed to publish only photographs of her that had been officially released. Editors also protested censorship by leaving blank spaces in newspaper columns where material had been removed. This practice of visual protest was subsequently made punishable under another martial law regulation.

Begum Zia accompanied her husband during his visit to New Delhi in 1982, where he held discussions with Indian Prime Minister Indira Gandhi on improving bilateral relations between India and Pakistan. During the visit, Begum Zia also met Gandhi. The visit, which took place during a brief stopover en route to Malaysia and Indonesia, was regarded as an important diplomatic engagement aimed at easing tensions and promoting greater cooperation between the two countries.

In 1983, President Zia-ul-Haq visited Japan as a state guest of the Japanese government, accompanied by Begum Zia. During the visit, they met Emperor Hirohito, Empress Nagako and Prime Minister Yasuhiro Nakasone.

A referendum on the Islamisation policy of President Zia-ul-Haq was held in Pakistan on 19 December 1984. Voters were asked whether they supported Zia-ul-Haq's proposals for amending several laws in accordance with the Quran and Sunnah, whether they wanted this process to continue, and whether they supported the Islamist ideology of Pakistan. The referendum also served as a way of extending Zia-ul-Haq's presidential term by five years.

Begum Zia with First Lady Nancy Reagan, Zia-Ul-Haq and President Ronald Reagan in 1982

In 1985, Begum Zia represented Pakistan at Nancy Reagan's First Ladies Conference on Drug Abuse alongside seventeen other first ladies. Addressing the conference, she noted that the government of Pakistan had established twenty-six centres for the rehabilitation of addicts. Begum Zia was invited to the United Nations that same year, where, at a second meeting attended by the first ladies of thirty nations, she called for holding a conference in a developing country where drug use could be studied in the context of poverty. Upon returning to Pakistan, she enlisted the cooperation of nongovernmental organizations in tackling the domestic drug abuse problem, and inaugurated the 1986 national conference of NGOs on drug abuse prevention in Karachi. Begum Zia's work was featured in a United States Information Agency film, along with that of Marly Sarney of Brazil, Queen Sirikit of Thailand, Queen Noor of Jordan, and Queen Silvia of Sweden.

Begum Zia was present at the inaugural session of the first SAARC summit in Dhaka, Bangladesh alongside the wives of other SAARC heads of state. In 1987, she accompanied President Zia to Jaipur for his cricket diplomacy visit, where she met with Gayatri Devi, then Indian Prime Minister Rajiv Gandhi and Sonia Gandhi.

Begum Zia's charitable and humanitarian work was recognised by Aga Khan IV in 1985, who, at the inauguration of the Aga Khan University Hospital, endowed scholarships for medical students and funds to support health care for the poor at the hospital in Begum Zia's name. In 1987, King Hussein of Jordan presented her with the Supreme Order of the Renaissance.

=== Death of Zia-ul-Haq (1988) ===
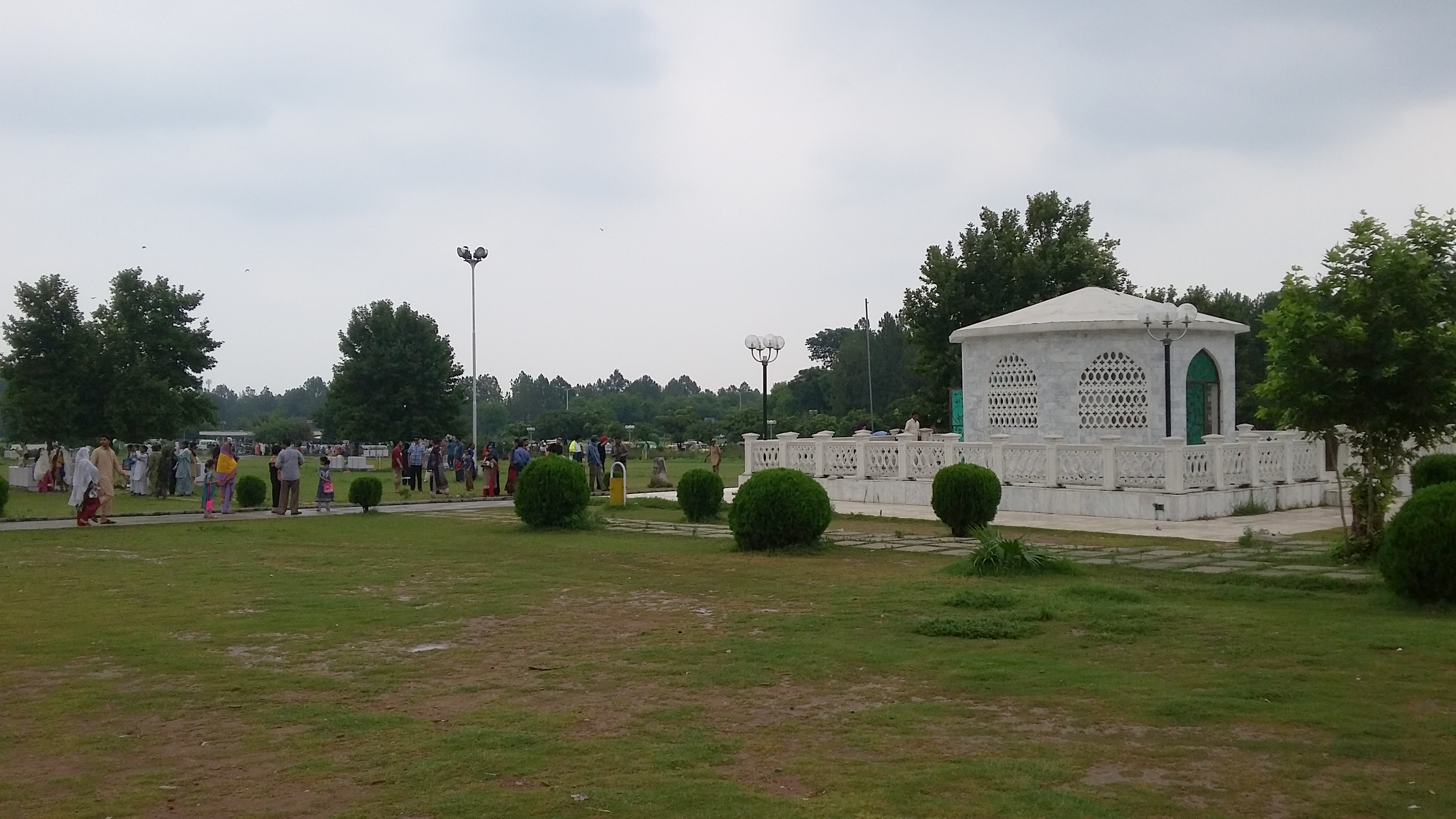
Zia ul Haq Tomb in Islamabad

Begum Zia's husband died in a plane crash on 17 August 1988, ending her tenure as First Lady. After General Zia witnessed a US M1 Abrams tank demonstration in Bahawalpur, he had left the city in the Punjab province by C-130B Hercules aircraft. The aircraft departed from Bahawalpur Airport and was expected to reach Islamabad International Airport. Shortly after a smooth takeoff, the control tower lost contact with the aircraft. Witnesses who saw the plane in the air afterward claim it was flying erratically, then nosedived and exploded on impact. In addition to Zia, 29 others died in the plane crash, including Chairman Joint Chiefs of Staff Committee General Akhtar Abdur Rahman, close associate of Zia, Brigadier Siddique Salik, the American ambassador to Pakistan Arnold Lewis Raphel and General Herbert M. Wassom, the head of the US military aid mission to Pakistan. Ghulam Ishaq Khan, the Senate chairman, announced Zia's death on radio and TV. Conditions surrounding his death have given rise to many conspiracy theories.

His state funeral was held on 19 August 1988 near Islamabad. Nearly one million mourners joined in chants of "Zia ul-Haq, you will live as long as the sun and moon remain above." The Government of Pakistan announced that Zia would be buried with military honours in a specially crafted white marble tomb, adjacent to Shah Faisal Mosque in Islamabad. The funeral was attended by 30 heads of state, including the presidents of Bangladesh, China, Egypt, Iran, India, Turkey, and the United Arab Emirates, as well as representatives of the kings of Saudi Arabia and Jordan. Key American politicians, U.S. Embassy staff in Islamabad, key personnel of the Pakistan Armed Forces, and chiefs of staff of the Army, Navy, Air Force also attended the funeral, as did the Aga Khan IV. His remains were laid to rest in a 4-by-10-foot (1.2 by 3.0 m) dirt grave in front of the Faisal Mosque that Zia and the Saudi government had built as a symbol of Pakistani-Saudi friendship.

=== Aftermath ===
In an interview given to Pakistan Television shortly after the death of her husband, Begum Zia recalled that she was in London with her daughter for medical reasons when Zia-ul-Haq imposed martial law on 5 July 1977. Reflecting on his assumption of power, she stated that his personality and behaviour towards his family did not change in a negative way, and described him as having become even more dedicated to his responsibilities. Despite his demanding official commitments, she said he continued to make time for his family. She also recounted her husband's final days before his death in August 1988. On 14 August, he followed his usual routine, attending official functions and spending time with his family. On the night of 16 August, he reportedly stayed awake until approximately 3 a.m. talking with family members and mentioned his scheduled visit to Bahawalpur the following day.

On 17 August 1988, Zia-ul-Haq left the family residence at approximately 7:45 a.m. for his journey to Bahawalpur. Begum Zia recalled waiting anxiously for news as the day progressed. Their son, Anwar, began receiving repeated telephone calls concerning reports of an aircraft crash. Although there was initially uncertainty among the president's staff about the incident, the family eventually received confirmation that President Zia-ul-Haq had died in the crash, which is how she learnt of her husband's death.

== Later life and death ==
Following Zia-ul-Haq's death in 1988, Begum Zia founded the Zia-ul-Haq Foundation. In 1989, her pension and privileges as the wife of a former president were revoked by the Benazir Bhutto government. Ijaz-ul-Haq accused Bhutto of harassing his mother. Begum Zia lived on an army pension, rental income from a house owned by her late husband, and support from her son Anwar, a physician who lived with her. She also lived with Zain, her 17 year old daughter, who was disabled. Her two other daughters resided abroad, one in the United States and the other in Saudi Arabia.

Begum Zia died on 5 January 1996 aged 64, at the Cromwell Hospital in London and is survived by her three daughters, Rubina, Quratulain, and Zain, and two sons, Ijaz and Anwar.

== Foreign honours ==
- Jordan: Supreme Order of the Renaissance

== Eponyms ==
- Dendrobium orchid Shafiq Zia-ul-Haq, Singapore Botanical Gardens (1983)
- Begum Shafiq Zia-ul-Haq Scholarship, Aga Khan University (1985)
