= Adnan Kandhar =

Pakistani music director (born 1986)

- Born: 5 February 1986 (age 40); Karachi, Sindh, Pakistan
- Occupations: Film director, film editor, photographer, film producer and CEO

Adnan Kandhar (born 5 February 1986) is a Pakistani photographer, cinematographer and music video director. He is best known for his music videos "Main Sufi Hun" (2013) for which he earned a nomination of Best Music Video Director at 13th Lux Style Awards and Won Best Music Video at 2nd Hum Awards. Kandhar got his second nomination at 3rd Hum Awards for "Shikva" (2014) in the same category. In 2015, Adnan won his first Best Music Video Director award at 14th Lux Style Awards.

== Early life and education ==
Kandhar was born in Jamshoro Hyderabad, Sindh. He received his early education in Hyderabad, Sindh and went on to receive his degree in arts from National College of Arts (NCA) Lahore, Punjab.

== Filmography ==
Music videos

| Year | Title | Artist/Band | Role |
|---|---|---|---|
| 2010 | Suspension of Disbelief* | N/A | Director |
| 2011 | Love Story | Project X Pyre | Director |
| 2013 | Main Sufi Hun | Sketches | Director |
| 2013 | Shikva | Faakhir | Director |
| 2014 | Dil Mian chumkey | josh band | Director |
| 2014 | Tery Bin | kaarma nation band | Director |
| 2014 | Narrey Narrey | kaarma nation band | Director |
| 2015 | Kooch | Nabeel Shaukat Ali | Director |
| 2016 | Surr Koi | Moeen Khan | Director |
| 2016 | Bulleya | Nabeel Shaukat Ali | Director |
| 2016 | Tum Naraz Ho | Daniyal Arshad | Director |
| 2016 | Pass Aao | Ahmed Ali | Director |
| 2017 | Ruseya Rawe | Nabeel Shaukat Ali | Director |
| 2018 | Teriyaan | Asim Azhar & Aima Baig | Director |
| 2018 | Vichora - ISPR | Rahat Fateh Ali Khan | Director |
| 2018 | Sawaal | Nabeel Shaukat Ali | Director |
| 2019 | Baba Ji Ki Booti | Bilal Saeed & Rap Demon | Director |
| 2019 | Mushkil | Jibran Raheel | Director |
| 2019 | Kyun hai Inkaar | Nabeel Shaukat Ali | Director |
| 2019 | Inti Aziza | Nabeel Shaukat Ali | Director |
| 2019 | Lambiyan Judaiyan | Bilal Saeed (cover) by Sataesh Khan | Director |
| 2020 | Tottay Char | Sohail Shahzad | Director |
| 2020 | When I was your man - Cover | Ammar Baig | Director |
| 2020 | Aj Janey Ki Zid Na Karo - Cover | Ammar Baig | Director |
| 2020 | Har Ghari Tayyar Kamran - ISPR | Ali Hamza, Ali Azmat, Ali Noor & Asim Azhar | Director |
| 2021 | Tera Deewana | Soch The Band | Director |
| 2021 | Kuch to Katygi | Zeb Bangash & Saad Sultan | Director |
| 2021 | Sheesha | Sohail Shahzad | Director |

OST

| Year | TV Show | Role | Studio |
|---|---|---|---|
| 2015 | Morning with Farah OST | Director | Kandhar Films |
| 2016 | Ek Nayee Subha With Farah OST | Director | Kandhar Films |
| 2015 | Mohabbat Hai Ramzan - OST | Director | Kandhar Films |

Music Shows

| Year | Client | Season | Role | Studio |
|---|---|---|---|---|
| 2012 | Nescafe Basement | Season 1 | Cinematographer | Kandhar Films |
| 2014 | Coke Studio | Season 7 | Behind the scene - DOP | Kandhar Films |
| 2020 | In the box | Season 1 | Editing | Kandhar Films |

TV Commercial

| Year | Title | Role | Studio |
|---|---|---|---|
| 2021 | H&S Hotel | Director | Kandhar Films |
| 2021 | Etihad town | Director | Kandhar Films |
| 2021 | Huawei - Taxi Driver | Director | Kandhar Films |
| 2021 | Huawei - Construction Worker | Director | Kandhar Films |
| 2021 | 18th Gulberg by H&S | Director | Kandhar Films |
| 2021 | Institute of Art & Culture (IAC) | Director | Kandhar Films |
| 2021 | Etihad Town Union Developers | Director | Kandhar Films |

Documentary

| Year | Title | Role |
|---|---|---|
| 2011 | Sheedi Badshah | Director, DOP |
| 2008 | Chandu Aur Tiger | Director |

== Awards and nominations ==
TV Commercials

| Year | Award | Category | work | Result |
|---|---|---|---|---|
| 2010 | SZABIST Film Awards | Best Experimental film | | Won |
| 2013 | Lux Style Awards | Best Music Video Director | "Main Sufi Hun" | Nominated |
| 2013 | Hum Awards | Best Music Video | "Main Sufi Hun" | Won |
| 2014 | Hum Awards | Best Music Video | "Shikva" | Nominated |
| 2014 | Lux Style Awards | Best Music Video Director | "Dil Main Chumke" | Won |
| 2015 | Hum Awards | Best Music Video | "Kooch" | Won |
