= Zia-ul-Haq =

6th President of Pakistan from 1978 to 1988

Zia-ul-Haq HI GCSJ RMP
- ضیاء الحق
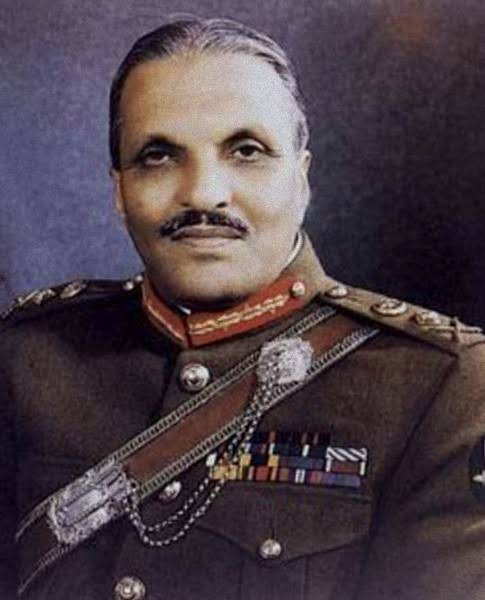
- Official Portrait

6th President of Pakistan
- In office 16 September 1978 – 17 August 1988
- Prime Minister: Muhammad Junejo (1985–1988)
- Preceded by: Fazal Ilahi Chaudhry
- Succeeded by: Ghulam Ishaq Khan

2nd Chief of the Army Staff
- In office 1 March 1976 – 17 August 1988
- President: Fazal Ilahi Chaudhry; Himself
- Prime Minister: Zulfikar Ali Bhutto; Muhammad Junejo
- Preceded by: Tikka Khan
- Succeeded by: Mirza Aslam Beg

4th Chief Martial Law Administrator
- In office 5 July 1977 – 24 March 1985
- President: Fazal Ilahi Chaudhry; Himself
- Preceded by: Zulfikar Ali Bhutto (as Prime Minister); Zulfikar Ali Bhutto (1973)
- Succeeded by: Muhammad Junejo (as Prime Minister)

Personal details
- Born: 12 August 1924 Jalandhar, Punjab Province, British India
- Died: 17 August 1988 (aged 64) Bahawalpur, Punjab, Pakistan
- Cause of death: Aircraft crash
- Resting place: Faisal Mosque, Islamabad
- Spouse: Shafiq Jahan (m. 1950)
- Children: 5, including Ijaz and Zain
- Education: Delhi University; Indian Military Academy

Military service
- Allegiance: (British Raj) British India (1943–1947); Pakistan (1947–1988)
- Branch/service: (British Raj) British Indian Army; Pakistan Army
- Years of service: 1943–1988
- Rank: General
- Unit: Guides Cavalry; Armoured Corps
- Commands: II Strike Corps; Chief of Army Staff; 1st Armoured Division 9th Armoured Brigade
- Battles/wars: Second World War; Pacific War; Burma campaign; Indonesian National Revolution; Battle of Surabaya; Indo-Pakistani war of 1965; Indo-Pakistani war of 1971; Black September; Spillover of the Soviet–Afghan war in Pakistan

Muhammad Zia-ul-Haq (Note: Urdu: محمد ضياء الحق, pronounced [mʊˈɦəmːəd zɪˈjaː ʊlˈɦəq].) (12 August 1924 – 17 August 1988) was a Pakistani general who ruled Pakistan from his coup in 1977 until his death in an airplane crash in 1988. He served as the chief martial law administrator from 1977 to 1985, and as the president of Pakistan from 1978 until his death. Zia was also the chief of the army staff of the Pakistan Army from 1976. He remains Pakistan's longest-serving de-facto ruler to date, and his political ideology is known as Ziaism.

Educated at Delhi University, Zia saw action in World War II as a British Indian Army officer in Burma and Malaya, before opting for Pakistan in 1947 and fighting as a tank commander in the Indo-Pakistani War of 1965. In 1970, he led a military training mission to Jordan, proving instrumental to defeating the Black September insurgency against King Hussein. Prime Minister Zulfikar Ali Bhutto appointed Zia Chief of Army Staff in 1976. Following civil disorder after the controversial 1977 general election, Zia deposed Bhutto in a military coup and declared martial law on 5 July 1977. Bhutto was controversially tried by the Supreme Court and executed less than two years later, for authorising the murder of a political opponent.

Assuming the presidency in 1978, Zia played a major role in the Soviet-Afghan War. Backed by the United States and Saudi Arabia, Zia coordinated the Afghan mujahideen against the Soviet occupation throughout the 1980s. This culminated in the Soviet Union's withdrawal in 1989, but also led to the proliferation of millions of refugees, with heroin and weaponry into Pakistan's North-West Frontier Province. Zia also bolstered ties with China and the United States, and emphasised Pakistan's role in the Islamic world, while relations with India worsened amid the Siachen conflict and accusations that Pakistan was aiding the Khalistan movement. Domestically, Zia passed broad-ranging legislation as part of Pakistan's Islamization, curbed civil liberties, and heightened press censorship. He also escalated Pakistan's atomic bomb project, and instituted industrialisation and deregulation, helping Pakistan's economy become the fastest-growing in South Asia. Averaged over Zia's rule, GDP growth was the highest in the country's history.

After lifting martial law and holding non-partisan elections in 1985, Zia appointed Muhammad Khan Junejo Prime Minister but accumulated more presidential powers via the Eighth Amendment to the Constitution. After Junejo signed the Geneva Accords in 1988 against Zia's wishes, and called for an inquiry into the Ojhri Camp disaster, Zia dismissed Junejo's government and announced fresh elections in November 1988. He was killed along with several of his top military officials and two American diplomats in a mysterious plane crash near Bahawalpur on 17 August 1988.

Zia remains a polarising figure in Pakistan's history, credited for preventing wider Soviet incursions into the region and introducing an era of economic prosperity, but decried for weakening democratic institutions and passing laws encouraging religious intolerance. He is also cited for promoting the early political career of Nawaz Sharif, who would be elected Prime Minister three times.

== Early life and education ==
Muhammad Zia-ul-Haq was born on 12 August 1924 in Jullundur, Punjab into a family belonging to the Arain tribe of Punjabis. His father, Muhammad Akbar Ali, worked in the Army General Headquarters in Delhi. Ali was noted for his religiousness which earned him the Muslim clerical title of maulvi. At an early age, Zia and his six siblings were taught the Qur'an.

After completing his initial education in Shimla, Zia attended Delhi's prestigious St. Stephen's College, an Anglican missionary school, for his bachelor's degree in history, from which he graduated with distinction in 1943. He was admitted to the Indian Military Academy at Dehradun, graduating in May 1945 among the last group of officers to be commissioned before the independence of India.

== Military service ==
=== Early career and partition ===
Zia was commissioned into the British Indian Army on 12 May 1943 after graduating from the Mhow Officer Training School. He was posted to the 13th Lancers, a cavalry unit equipped with tanks. During the Second World War, Zia participated in the Burma campaign of the Pacific War against the Imperial Japanese Army.

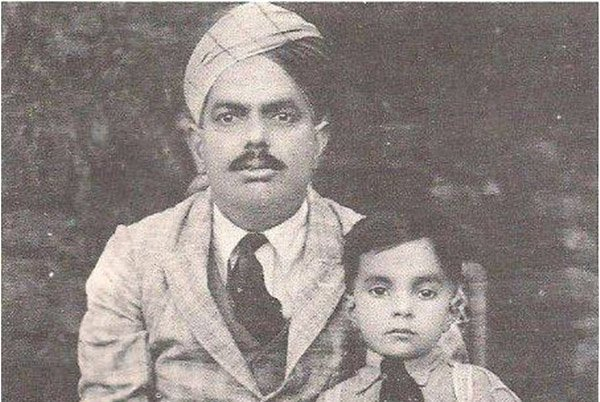
Muhammad Zia-ul-Haq with his father in 1929

Zia also participated in Indonesian National Revolution and the Battle of Surabaya.

Following the Partition of India in 1947, Zia was the escort officer for the last train of refugees to leave Babina, an armoured corps training centre in Uttar Pradesh, a difficult journey that took seven days, during which the passengers were under constant fire due to communal violence which broke out in the aftermath of the Partition.

After the partition, Zia joined the Pakistan Army, In September 1950, he joined the Guides Cavalry. He was trained in the United States from 1962–1964 at the United States Army Command and General Staff College at Fort Leavenworth, Kansas. After that, he returned to take over as Directing Staff at Command and Staff College, Quetta. During the Indo-Pakistani War of 1965, Zia is said to have been the Assistant Quartermaster of the 101st Infantry Brigade.. In 1969 he raised the 9th Armoured Brigade in Kharian as the first Brigade Commander of the unit; the brigade is currently stationed in Gujranwala under the 6th Armoured Division.

As a young soldier, Zia preferred prayers when "drinking, gambling, dancing and music were the way officers spent their free time."

=== Role in Black September ===
Zia was stationed in Jordan from 1967 to 1970 as the head of a Pakistani training mission to Jordan. He later became involved as an advisor for the Jordanians during the Black September against the Palestinian Liberation Organization (PLO). Zia had been stationed in Amman for three years prior to Black September. During the events, according to CIA official Jack O'Connell, Zia was dispatched by Hussein north to assess Syria's military capabilities. The Pakistani commander reported back to Hussein, recommending the deployment of a Royal Jordanian Air Force squadron to the region. According to Pakistani journalist Raja Anwar, the mission may have been a violation of Zia's original assignment in Jordan by the Pakistani military, even though it helped Jordan repel the Syrian offensive. Hussein came to view Zia favourably, and later convinced Pakistani president Zulfikar Ali Bhutto to appoint him as Chief of Army Staff. O'Connell also said that Zia personally led Jordanian troops during the battles.

=== Ascent to Chief of Army Staff ===
He was then promoted as lieutenant general and was appointed commander of the II Corps at Multan in 1975. On 1 March 1976, Prime Minister Zulfikar Ali Bhutto approved then-three star rank general Lieutenant General Zia to Chief of Army Staff and to be elevated to four-star rank.

At the time of his nomination as the successor to the outgoing chief of army staff, General Tikka Khan, the lieutenant generals in order of seniority were: Muhammad Shariff, Akbar Khan, Aftab Ahmed, Azmat Baksh Awan, Ibrahim Akram, Abdul Majeed Malik, Ghulam Jilani Khan, and Zia himself. Bhutto chose the most junior, superseding seven more senior lieutenant-generals. However, the senior most at that time, Lieutenant General Mohammad Shariff, though promoted to General, was made the chairman of the Joint Chiefs of Staff Committee.

Pakistani academic Husain Haqqani argues that Bhutto chose Zia ahead of many senior officers for ethnic and caste reasons, thinking that an Arain would not make an alliance with the predominantly Pashtun and Rajput military officers in order to overthrow him, and this is also the reason why he let Zia push for more Islam in the armed forces. Thus, Bhutto let him change the army's motto to Iman, Taqwa, Jihad fi sabilillah and let him offer books of Abul A'la Maududi, an Islamic scholar and critic of Bhutto, to his officers as prizes during various competitions, despite the strong ideological antagonism between Bhutto and Zia.

== Military coup ==
=== Pre-coup unrest ===
Bhutto began facing considerable criticism and increasing unpopularity as his term progressed; the alliance of socialists in Pakistan who had previously allied with Bhutto began to diminish as time progressed. Bhutto also targeted opposition leader Abdul Wali Khan and his party the National Awami Party (NAP). Despite the socialistic ideological similarity of the two parties, the clash of egos between the two men became increasingly fierce, starting with the Bhutto government's decision to oust the NAP provincial government in Balochistan for alleged secessionist activities and subsequent banning of the NAP with the arrest of much of its leadership after the death of a close lieutenant of Bhutto's, Hayat Sherpao, in a bomb blast in the frontier town of Peshawar.

Dissidence also increased within Bhutto's Pakistan Peoples Party (PPP), and the murder of leading dissident Ahmed Raza Kasuri's father led to public outrage and intra-party hostility because Bhutto was accused of masterminding the crime. PPP leaders such as Ghulam Mustafa Khar openly condemned Bhutto and called for protests against his regime. The political crisis in the North-West Frontier Province and Balochistan intensified as civil liberties remained suspended, and an estimated 100,000 troops deployed in the two provinces were accused of abusing human rights and killing large numbers of civilians.

On 8 January 1977, a large number of opposition political parties grouped to form the Pakistan National Alliance (PNA). Bhutto called fresh elections, and the PNA participated fully to ouster Bhutto. The PNA managed to contest the elections jointly even though there were grave splits on opinions and views within the alliance. The PNA faced defeat but did not accept the results, alleging that the election was rigged. On 11 March 1977, the alliance called a nationwide strike followed by vicious demonstrations demanding fresh elections. Around 200 people were killed in the encounters between protestors and security forces. They proceeded to boycott the provincial elections. Despite this, there was a high voter turnout in the national elections; however, as provincial elections were held amidst low voter turnout and an opposition boycott, the PNA viewed Bhutto's government as illegitimate.

Soon, all the opposition leaders called for the overthrow of Bhutto's regime. Political and civil disorder intensified, which led to more unrest. On 21 April 1977, Bhutto imposed martial law in the major cities of Karachi, Lahore and Hyderabad. However, a compromise agreement between Bhutto and opposition was ultimately reported. Zia planned the coup d'état carefully as he knew Bhutto had integral intelligence in the Pakistan Armed Forces, and many officers, including chief of air staff Air Marshal Zulfiqar Ali Khan, Major General Tajammul Hussain Malik, and Major General Naseerullah Babar

=== Execution of coup d'etat ===
The coup (codenamed Operation Fair Play) transpired in the early hours of 5 July 1977. Before the announcement of any agreement, Bhutto and members of his cabinet were arrested by troops of the military police under the order of Zia. Bhutto tried to call Zia but all telephone lines were disconnected. When Zia spoke to him later, he reportedly told Bhutto that he was sorry that he had been forced to perform such an "unpleasant task". Zia and his military government portrayed the coup as a "spontaneous response to a difficult situation", but his response was a complete contradiction. Soon after the coup, Zia told the British journalist Edward Behr of Newsweek:

I [Zia] am the only man who took this decision [Fair Play] and I did so on 1700 Hrs on 4[th] July after hearing the press statement which indicated that the talks between Mr. Bhutto and the opposition had broken down. Had an agreement been reached between them, I would certainly never had done what I did.

— General Zia-ul-Haq, statement given to Newsweek,

However, Zia's vice chief of the army staff, General Khalid Mahmud Arif, contradicted Zia's statement when Arif noted that the coup had already been planned, and the senior leadership of the armed forces had solid information. Therefore, Arif met with Bhutto on an emergency basis, stressing and urging Bhutto to "rush negotiations with the opposition". By Arif's account, the talks had not broken down even though the coup was very much in the offing. Zia further argued that the operation against Bhutto had been necessitated by the prospect of a civil war that Bhutto had been planning by distributing weapons to his supporters. However, Arif strongly rejected Zia's remarks on Bhutto, and citing no evidence that weapons were found or recovered at any of the party's election offices, the military junta did not prosecute Bhutto on the charge of planning civil war. After deposing Prime Minister Bhutto on 5 July 1977, Zia declared martial law, and appointed himself Chief Martial Law Administrator, which he remained until declaring himself president on 16 September 1978.

Immediately, the chief of naval staff, Admiral Mohammad Shariff, announced his and the navy's strong support for Zia's military government. But the chief of air staff, Air Marshal Zulfikar Ali Khan, remained unsupportive. General Muhammad Shariff remained neutral, while he silently expressed his support to Prime Minister Zulfikar Bhutto. In 1978, Zia pressured President Fazal Ilahi Chaudhry to appoint Air Marshal Anwar Shamim as Chief of Air Staff; and Admiral Karamat Rahman Niazi as Chief of Naval Staff in 1979. On Zia's recommendation, President Illahi appointed Admiral Mohammad Shariff as Chairman of the Joint Chiefs of Staff, hence making the Admiral the highest-ranking officer and principal military adviser overlooking all of the inter-services, including the Chiefs of Staff of the respected forces. In 1979, the Chiefs of Army, Navy, and the Air Force, including the Chairman of the Joint Chiefs of Staff validated the coup as constitutional and legal under the war-torn circumstances, pledging their support to Zia as well.

== Dictatorship (1977–1988) ==
=== Postponement of elections ===
After assuming power as Chief Martial Law Administrator, Zia shortly appeared on national television, promising to hold neutral parliamentary elections within the next 90 days

My sole aim is to organise free and fair elections which would be held in October this year. Soon after the polls, power will be transferred to the elected representatives of the people. I give a solemn assurance that I will not deviate from this schedule.

He also stated that the Constitution had not been abrogated, but temporarily suspended. Zia did not trust the civilian institutions and legislators to ensure the country's governance; therefore, in October 1977, he announced the postponement of the electoral plan and decided to start an accountability process for politicians. On television, Zia strongly defended his decision for postponing the elections and demanded the "scrutiny of political leaders who had engaged in malpractice in the past". Thus, the PNA adopted its policy of "retribution first, elections later". Zia's policy severely tainted his credibility as many saw the broken promise as malicious. Another motive was that Zia widely suspected that once out of power, the size of PPP allies would swell and result in better electoral performances. This led to request for postponement of elections by right-wing Islamists as well as left-wing socialists, formerly allied with Bhutto, who displaced Bhutto in the first place. Zia dispatched an intelligence unit, the Inter-Services Intelligence (ISI)'s Political Wing, dispatching Brigadier General Taffazul Hussain Siddiqiui to Bhutto's native province, Sindh, to assess whether people would accept martial law. The Political Wing also contacted the several Islamists and conservatives, promising an election, with the PNA power-sharing the government with Zia. The military government successfully divided and separated secular political forces from right-wing Islamists and conservatives, and later purged each member of the secular front.

A disqualification tribunal was formed, and several individuals who had been members of parliament were charged with malpractice and disqualified from participating in politics at any level for the next seven years. A white paper document was issued, incriminating the deposed Bhutto government on several counts.

It is reported by senior officers that when Zia met federal secretaries for the first time as leader of the country after martial law, he said that "He does not possess the charisma of Bhutto, personality of Ayub Khan or the legitimacy of Liaquat Ali Khan" thereby implying how can he be marketed.

=== Supreme Court support for Zia's dictatorship ===
Nusrat Bhutto, the wife of the deposed prime minister, filed a suit against Zia's government, challenging the validity of his military coup. The Supreme Court ruled, in what would later be known as the doctrine of necessity, that Zia's overthrow of the Bhutto government was legal on the grounds of necessity. The judgement tightened Zia's hold on the government.

=== Trial of Zulfikar Ali Bhutto ===
Zulfikar Ali Bhutto was arrested during the coup but released shortly afterwards. Upon his release, Bhutto travelled the country amid large crowds of PPP supporters. On 3 September 1977, he was arrested again by the army on charges of authorising the murder of a political opponent in March 1974. The trial proceedings began 24 October 1977 and lasted five months. On 18 March 1978, Bhutto was declared guilty of murder and was sentenced to death.

According to academics Aftab Kazie and Roedad Khan, Zia hated Bhutto and had used inappropriate language and insults to describe him and his colleagues. The Supreme Court ruled four-to-three in favour of execution. The Lahore High Court gave him the death sentence on charges of the murder of the father of Ahmed Raza Kasuri, a dissident PPP politician. Despite many clemency appeals from foreign leaders requesting Zia to commute Bhutto's death sentence, Zia dismissed the appeals and upheld the death sentence. On 4 April 1979, Bhutto was hanged, after the Supreme Court upheld the death sentence as passed by the Lahore High Court.

The hanging of an elected prime minister by a military dictator was condemned by the international community and by lawyers and jurists across Pakistan. Bhutto's trial was highly controversial. In 2024, in response to a 2011 reference filed by Bhutto's son-in-law and former president of Pakistan, Asif Ali Zardari, Pakistan's Supreme Court ruled that Bhutto was not subject to a fair trial.

=== Appointment of martial law administrators ===
==== Martial law judges ====
The appointments of senior justices to the Supreme Court was one of the earliest and major steps that were taken out by the military government under Zia-ul-Haq. After calling for martial law, Zia pressured President Fazal Ilahi Chaudhry to appoint Justice Sheikh Anwarul Haq to chief justice on 23 September 1977. Immediately, Chief Justice Yaqub Ali was forcefully removed from the office after the latter agreed to re-hear the petition filed at the Supreme Court by Nusrat Bhutto on 20 September 1977. After Justice Yaqub Ali's removal, Bhutto objected to the inclusion of the new chief justice, Sheikh Anwar-ul-Haq, as a chief justice of the bench on the grounds that by accepting the office of acting president during the absence of Zia from the country, he had compromised his impartial status. Bhutto also stated that the Chief Justice in his public statements had been critical of his government in the recent past.

The objection was over-ruled by the Chief Justice Anwar-ul-Haq, and the case of Bhutto was again heard by the Chief Justice Haq as the bench's lead judge, and presided the whole case of Zulfikar Ali Bhutto while forcing the martial law throughout Pakistan. Shortly, after Zia's return, another judge, Mushtak Ahmad, also gained Zia and Anwar-ul-Haq's support and elevated as the Chief Justice of Lahore High Court; he was too part of the bench who retained the death sentence of Zulfikar Ali Bhutto even though Bhutto was not declared guilty of the murder of the political opponent. In 1979, when Zia departed for Saudi Arabia, Justice Anwar-ul-Haq served as interim president of Pakistan.

==== Martial law governors ====
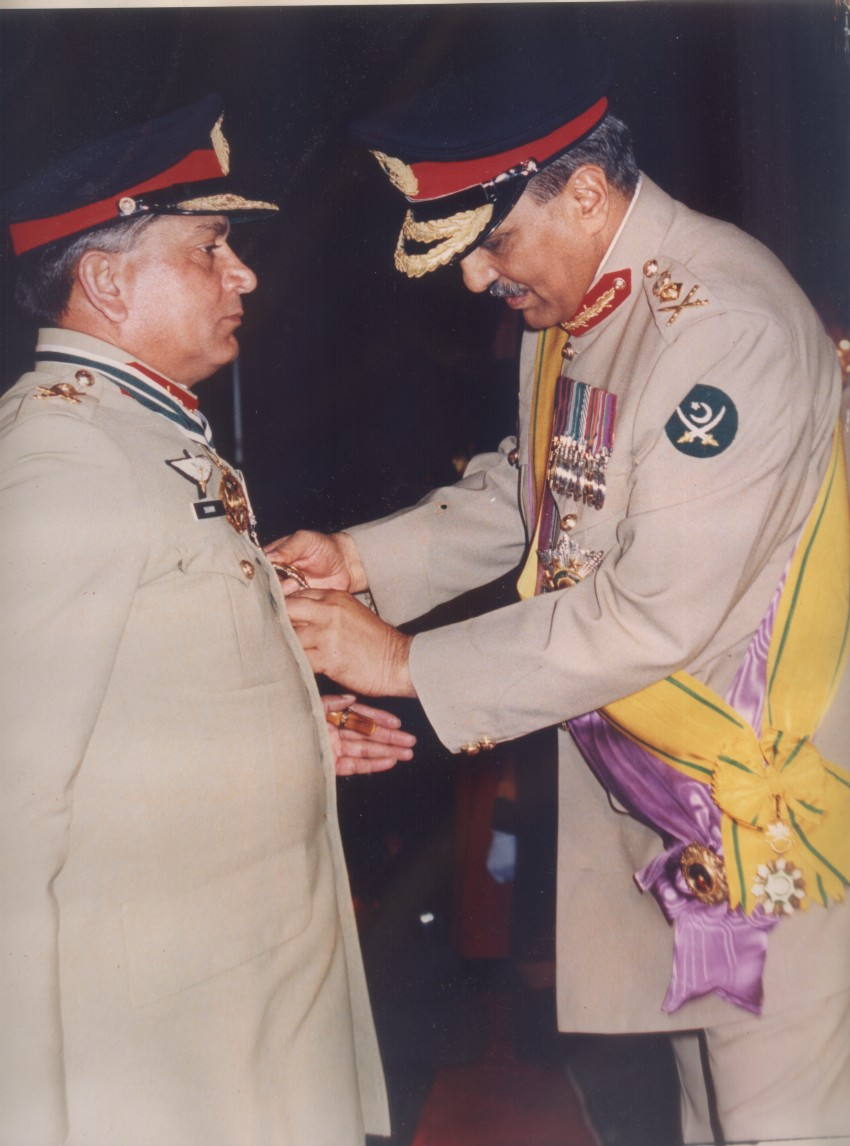
Zia presenting the Hilal-i-Imtiaz to Shamim Alam Khan

The Zia regime largely made use of installing high-profile military generals to carte blanche provincial administration under martial law. Zia's Guides Cavalry comrade Lieutenant General Fazle Haq was appointed martial law administrator of Khyber Pakhtunkhwa. General Haq was considered a strong vocal general and a strong man in support of Zia's regime. General Haq was the commander of the XI Corps.

The second appointment was of Lieutenant General S.M. Abbasi, who was appointed martial law administrator of Sindh; his tenure saw civil disorder amid student riots. The third martial law administrator appointment was of Lieutenant General Ghulam Jilani Khan to Punjab. The ascent of Nawaz Sharif to Chief Minister of Punjab was largely due to General Jilani's sponsorship. The fourth martial law administrator appointment was of Lieutenant General Rahimuddin Khan to Balochistan. As martial law administrator, Khan cracked down on the Baloch insurgency and constructed nuclear test sites in Chagai district.

Zia benefited from the capable martial law administrators who previously had worked with the military governments of former president Yahya Khan and Ayub Khan in the 1960s.

In 1979, Zia influenced the Pakistan Navy's Promotion Board several times after he succeeded first in the appointment of Admiral Karamat Rahman Niazi as chief of naval staff in 1979, and Admiral Tarik Kamal Khan, also as chief of naval staff, in 1983. On his request, then-President Fazal Illahi approved the appointment of General Anwar Shamim as Chief of Air Staff and following President's resignation, Zia appointed Shamim as the Deputy Chief Martial Law Administrator. In the matters of serious national security, General Zia had taken the chief of air staff and chief of naval staff in confidence after he discussed the matters with the respected chiefs of Staff. Zia's appointment in inter-services were highly crucial for his military government and served as a preemptive measure to ensure the continuous loyalty of the navy and air force to himself and his regime.

=== Assumption of Presidency (1978–1988) ===
After the dismissal of most of the Bhutto government, President Fazal Ilahi Chaudhry decided to resign from his post, due to contentious relations with the military After completing his term Chaudhry resigned and Zia declared himself president on 16 September 1978. Zia would continue to hold on to the position of president until his death in the plane crash that killed him in 1988.

=== Domestic policy ===
==== Formation of Majlis-e-Shoora ====
Although ostensibly only holding office until free elections could be held, General Zia, like the previous military governments, disapproved of the lack of discipline and orderliness that often accompanies multiparty "parliamentary democracy." He preferred a "presidential" form of government and a system of decision making by technical experts, or "technocracy". His first replacement for the parliament was a Majlis-e-Shura, or "consultative council." After banning all political parties in 1979 he disbanded parliament and at the end of 1981 set up the Majlis, which was to act as a board of advisors to the president and assist with governance. The 350 members of the Shura were to be nominated by the President and possessed only the power to consult with him, and in reality served only to endorse decisions already taken by the government. Most members of the Shoora were intellectuals, scholars, ulema, journalists, economists, and professionals in different fields.

Zia's parliament and military government reflected the idea of "military-bureaucratic technocracy" (MBT) where professionals, engineers, and high-profile military officers were initially part of his military government. His antipathy for the politicians led the promotion of bureaucratic-technocracy which was seen a strong weapon of countering the politicians and their political strongholds. Senior statesman and technocrats were included physicist-turned diplomat Agha Shahi, jurist Sharifuddin Perzada, corporate leader Nawaz Sharif, economist Mahbub ul Haq, senior statesmen Aftab Kazi and Roedad Khan, and chemist-turned diplomat Ghulam Ishaq Khan, were a few of the leading technocratic figures in his military government.

==== 1984 referendum ====
After Bhutto's execution, momentum to hold elections began to mount both internationally and within Pakistan. But before handing over power to elected representatives, Zia-ul-Haq attempted to secure his position as the head of state. A referendum was held on 19 December 1984 with the option being to elect or reject the General as the future President, the wording of the referendum making a vote against Zia appear to be a vote against Islam. According to official figures 97.8% of votes were cast in favour of Zia, however only 20% of the electorate participated in the referendum.

==== 1985 parliamentary elections and constitutional amendments ====
After holding the 1984 referendum, Zia succumbed to international pressure and gave permission to election commission to hold national wide general elections but without political parties in February 1985. Most of the major opposing political parties decided to boycott the elections but election results showed that many victors belonged to one party or the other. Critics complained that ethnic and sectarian mobilisation filled the void left by banning political parties (or making elections "non-partisan"), to the detriment of national integration.

The General worked to give himself the power to dismiss the Prime Minister dissolve the National Assembly, appoint provincial governors and the chief of the armed forces. His prime minister Muhammad Khan Junejo was known as an unassuming and soft-spoken Sindhi.

Before handing over the power to the new government and lifting the martial law, Zia got the new legislature to retroactively accept all of Zia's actions of the past eight years, including his coup of 1977. He also managed to get several amendments passed, most notably the Eighth Amendment, which granted "reserve powers" to the president to dissolve the Parliament. However, this amendment considerably reduced the power he'd previously granted himself to dissolve the legislature, at least on paper. The text of the amendment permitted Zia to dissolve the Parliament only if the government had been toppled by a vote of no confidence and it was obvious that no one could form a government or the government could not function in a constitutional manner.

==== Islamisation of Pakistan ====
The primary policy of Zia's government was "Shariaisation" or "Islamisation". In 1977, before the coup, the drinking and selling of wine by Muslims, along with nightclubs, and horse racing was banned by Prime Minister Bhutto to stem the tide of street Islamisation. Zia went much further, committing himself to enforce Nizam-e-Mustafa ("Rule of the Prophet" or an Islamic System, i.e. establishing an Islamic state and sharia law), a significant turn from Pakistan's predominantly secular law, inherited from the British.

In his first televised speech to the country as head of state Zia declared that:

Pakistan which was created in the name of Islam will continue to survive only if it sticks to Islam. That is why I consider the introduction of [an] Islamic system as an essential prerequisite for the country.

In the past, he complained, "Many a ruler did what they pleased in the name of Islam."

Zia established "Sharia Benches" in each high court (later the Federal Sharia Court) to judge legal cases using the teachings of the Quran and the Sunna, and to align Pakistan's legal statutes with Islamic doctrine. Zia bolstered the influence of the ulema and the Islamic parties. Thousands of activists from the Jamaat-e-Islami party were appointed to government posts to ensure the maintenance of his Islamist agenda. Conservative ulema were added to a Council of Islamic Ideology.

Islamisation was a sharp change from Bhutto's original philosophical rationale captured in the slogan, "Food, clothing, and shelter". In Zia's view, socialist economics and a secular-socialist orientation served only to upset Pakistan's natural order and weaken its moral fibre. Zia defended his policies in an interview in 1979 given to British journalist Ian Stephens:

The basis of Pakistan was Islam. ... Muslims of the subcontinent are a separate culture. It was on the Two-Nation Theory that this part was carved out of the Subcontinent as Pakistan... Mr. Bhutto's way of flourishing in this Society was by eroding its moral fiber. ... by pitching students against teachers, children against their parents, landlord against tenants, workers against mill owners. [Pakistan has economic difficulties] because Pakistanis have been made to believe that one can earn without working. ... We are going back to Islam not by choice but by the force of circumstances. It is not I or my government that is imposing Islam. It was what 99 percent of people wanted; the street violence against Bhutto reflected the people's desire ...

— General Zia-ul-Haq,

Secular and leftist activists and politicians in Pakistan accused Zia of manipulating Islam for political ends. According to Nusrat Bhutto, former First Lady of Pakistan:

The ... horrors of 1971 war ... are (still) alive and vivid in the hearts and the minds of people of [Pakistan]...Therefore, General Zia insanely ... used Islam ... to ensure the survival of his regime....

— Nusrat Bhutto, <

The Zakat and Ushr Ordinance was implemented in 1980. The measure called for a 2.5% annual deduction from personal bank accounts on the first day of Ramadan, with the revenue to be used for poverty relief. Zakat committees were established to oversee the distribution of the funds. The measure was opposed by Shia Muslims, who do not consider the collection of Zakat an obligation. In the first days of the tax, Shia Muslims who followed the Ja'fari school raised strong opposition, and in April 1981, the government made an exemption allowing Shia to file for exemptions.

Among Sunni Muslims, Deobandis, and Barelvis also had disputes. Zia favoured the Deobandi doctrine, which led to Barelvis joining the anti-Zia Movement for the Restoration of Democracy.

Pakistani Canadian Sufi scholar Syed Soharwardy states that Zia "changed Pakistan from a Sufi-dominated state to a Salafi-dominated state", estimating that if 70% of mosques were Sufis due to Zia they were reduced, and in the army, this change has been even more radical, as he estimates that military mosques went from 90% Sufi in the 70s to 85% Deobandi under Zia.

===== Islamic Law =====
Under Zia, the order for women to cover their heads while in public was implemented in public schools, colleges, and state television. Women's participation in sports and the performing arts was severely restricted. Following Sharia law, women's legal testimony was given half the weight of a man's.

In 1981, interest payments were replaced by profit and loss sharing accounts; however, profit and loss sharing was simply viewed as another name for the practice of interest . Textbooks were overhauled to remove un-Islamic material, and un-Islamic books were removed from libraries.

Eating and drinking during Ramadan were outlawed, and attempts were made to enforce praying of salah five times a day.

===== Hudood Ordinance =====
One of his first and most controversial measures to Islamise Pakistani society was the replacement of parts of the Pakistan Penal Code (PPC) with the 1979 Hudood Ordinance. The Ordinance added new criminal offences of adultery and fornication to Pakistani law, and new punishments of whipping, amputation, and stoning to death.

For theft or robbery, the PPC punishments of imprisonment fine, or both, were replaced by amputation of the right hand of the offender for theft, and amputation of the right hand and left foot for robbery. For Zina (extramarital sex), the provisions relating to adultery were replaced by the Ordinance with punishments of 100 lashes for those unmarried offenders, and stoning to death for married offenders.

All these punishments were dependent on the proof required for hadd being met. In practice, the Hudd requirement—four Muslim men of good repute testifying as witnesses to the crime—was seldom met. As of 2014, no offenders have been stoned or had limbs amputated by the Pakistani judicial system. To be found guilty of theft, Zina, or drinking alcohol by less strict tazir standards—where the punishment was flogging and/or imprisonment—was common, and there have been many floggings.

More worrisome for human rights and women's rights advocates, lawyers, and politicians was the incarceration of thousands of rape victims on charges of Zina. The onus of providing proof in a rape case rests with the woman herself. Uncorroborated testimony by women was inadmissible in hudood crimes. If the victim/accuser was unable to prove her allegation, bringing the case to court was considered equivalent to a confession of sexual intercourse outside of lawful marriage. Despite this, the ordinance remained in force until the Women's Protection Bill was passed in 2006.

Although Sharia punishments were imposed, the due process, witnesses, law of evidence, and prosecution system remained inherited from British-era penal codes.

The hybridisation of Pakistan's penal code with Islamic laws was difficult because of the difference in the underlying logic of the two legal systems.

===== Blasphemy ordinances =====
To outlaw blasphemy, the PPP and the Criminal Procedure Code (CPC) were amended through ordinances in 1980, 1982, and 1986. The 1980 law prohibited derogatory remarks against Islamic personages and carried a three-year prison sentence. In 1982 the small Ahmadiyya religious minority were prohibited from saying or implying they were Muslims. In 1986, stating or doing anything that implied disrespect to the Islamic prophet Muhammad, Ahl al-Bayt, Sahabah, or Sha'ar-i-Islam was made a cognisable offence, punishable with imprisonment, a fine, or death.

===== Madrassa expansions =====
Traditional religious madrassas in Pakistan received state sponsorship for the first time, under General Zia-ul-Haq's administration, their number grew from 893 to 2,801. Most were Deobandi in doctrinal orientation, while one-quarter of them were Barelvi. They received funding from Zakat councils and provided free religious training, room, and board to impoverished Pakistanis. The schools, which banned televisions and radios, have been criticised by authors for stoking sectarian hatred both between Muslim sects and against non-Muslims.

==== Cultural policies ====
In a 1979 address to the nation, Zia decried the Western culture and music in the country. Soon afterward, PTV, the national television network, ceased playing music videos and only patriotic songs were broadcast. New taxes were levied on the film industry and most of the cinemas in Lahore were shut down. New tax rates were introduced, further decreasing cinema attendances.

It was under Zia and the economic prosperity of his era that the country's urban middle and lower-middle-classes expanded and Western 1980s fashion wear and hairstyle spread in popularity, and rock music bands gained momentum, according to leftist cultural critic Nadeem F. Paracha.

==== Welfare for disabled individuals ====
During his tenure, he oversaw the passing of an ordinance for the welfare of people with disabilities. The ordinance is called "The Disabled Persons (Employment and Rehabilitation) Ordinance, 1981" and it was passed into law on 29 December 1981. It provides measures for the employment, rehabilitation, and welfare of people with disabilities.

==== Nuclear weapons programme ====
One of the earliest initiatives taken by Zia in 1977, was to militarise the integrated atomic energy programme which was founded by Zulfiqar Ali Bhutto in 1972. During the first stages, the programme was under the control of Bhutto and the Directorate for Science, under Science Advisor Dr. Mubashir Hassan, who was heading the civilian committee that supervised the construction of the facilities and laboratories. This atomic bomb project had no boundaries with Munir Ahmad Khan and Dr. Abdul Qadeer Khan leading their efforts separately and reported to Bhutto and his science adviser Dr. Hassan who had little interest in the atomic bomb project. Major General Zahid Ali Akbar, an engineering officer, had little role in the atomic project; Zia responded by taking over the programme under military control and disbanded the civilian directorate when he ordered the arrest of Hassan. This whole giant nuclear energy project was transferred into the administrative hands of Major-General Akbar who was soon made the Lieutenant-General and Engineer-in-Chief of the Pakistan Army Corps of Engineers to deal with the authorities whose co-operation was required. Akbar consolidated the entire project by placing the scientific research under military control, setting boundaries and goals. Akbar proved to be an extremely capable officer in the matters of science and technology when he aggressively led the development of nuclear weapons under Munir Ahmad Khan and Abdul Qadeer Khan in a matter of five years.

By the time, Zia assumed control, the research facilities became fully functional and 90% of the work on atom bomb project was completed. Both the Pakistan Atomic Energy Commission (PAEC) and the Khan Research Laboratories (KRL) had built the extensive research infrastructure started by Bhutto. Akbar's office was shifted to Army's General Headquarters (GHQ) and Akbar guided Zia on key matters of nuclear science and atomic bomb production. He became the first engineering officer to have acknowledge Zia about the success of this energy project into a fully matured programme. On the recommendation of Akbar, Zia approved the appointment of Munir Ahmad Khan as the scientific director of the atomic bomb project, as Zia was convinced by Akbar that civilian scientists under Munir Khan's directorship were at their best to counter international pressure.

This was proved when the PAEC conducted the cold-fission test of a fission device, codename Kirana-I on 11 March 1983 at the Weapon-Testing Laboratories-I, under the leadership of weapon-testing laboratory's director Dr. Ishfaq Ahmad. Lieutenant-General Zahid Akbar went to GHQ and notified Zia about the success of this test. The PAEC responded by conducting several cold-tests throughout the 1980s, a policy also continued by Benazir Bhutto in the 1990s. According to the reference in the book, "Eating Grass", Zia was so deeply convinced of the infiltration of Western and American moles and spies into the project, that he extended his role in the atomic bomb, which reflected extreme "paranoia", in both his personal and professional life. He virtually had PAEC and KRL separated from each other and made critical administrative decisions rather than putting scientists in charge of the aspects of the atomic programme. His actions spurred innovation in the atomic bomb project and an intense secrecy and security culture permeated PAEC and KRL.

Even though Zia had removed the Bhutto sentiment in the nuclear energy project, Zia did not completely disband Bhutto's policy on nuclear weapons. After the retirement of Zahid Ali Akbar, Zia transferred control of the nuclear weapons programme to Bhutto's close aide Munir Ahmad Khan, Chairman of the Pakistan Atomic Energy Commission. Soon, Zia promoted Khan as the technical director of the entire programme as well as appointing Khan as his Science Adviser. With the support of handpicked civilian Prime Minister Muhammad Khan Junejo, Zia sanctioned the launch of the 50 Megawatt (MW) heavy water plutonium production reactor, known as Khushab-I, at Khushab in 1985. Zia also took initiatives to launch the space projects as spin-off to nuclear project. Zia appointed nuclear engineer Salim Mehmud as the Administrator of the Space Research Commission. Zia also launched the work on the country's first satellite, Badr-1, a military satellite. In 1987, Zia launched the clandestine aerospace project, the Integrated Missile Research Program under General Anwar Shamim in 1985, and later under Lieutenant-General Talat Masood in 1987.

==== Economic policy ====
In general, Zia gave economic development and policy a fairly low personal focus (aside from Islamisation), and delegated its management to technocrats such as finance minister Ghulam Ishaq Khan, Aftab Qazi and Vaseem Jaffrey. However, the average GDP growth rate was 5.88% during Zia's eleven years in office, the highest in Pakistani history. Between 1977 and 1986, the country experienced an average annual gross national product (GNP) growth of 6.8%—the highest in the world at that time—thanks in large part to remittances from the overseas workers, rather than government policy alone. The first year of Zia's government coincided with a dramatic rise in remittances, which totalled $3.2 billion/year for most of the 1980s, accounting for 10 percent of Pakistan's GDP; 45% of its current account receipts, and 40% of total foreign exchange earnings.

By the time General Zia initiated his coup against Prime Minister Zulfikar Bhutto, the nationalisation programme had been completed. The socialist orientation and nationalisation programme of Bhutto was slowly reversed; the idea of corporatisation was heavily favoured by President Zia-ul-Haq to direct the authoritarianism in the nationalised industries. One of his well-known and earliest initiatives aimed to Islamise the national economy which featured an interest-free economic cycle. No actions towards privatising the industries were ordered by President Zia; only three steel mill industries were returned to their previous owners.

By the end of 1987, the finance ministry had begun studying the process of engaging the gradual privatisation and economic liberalisation.

=== Foreign affairs ===
==== Soviet–Afghan War ====
On 25 December 1979, the Soviet Union invaded Afghanistan. Following this invasion, Zia chaired a meeting and was asked by several cabinet members to refrain from interfering in the war, owing to the vastly superior military power of the USSR. Zia, however, was ideologically opposed to the idea of communism taking over a neighbouring country, supported by the fear of Soviet advancement into Pakistan, particularly Balochistan, in search of warm waters, and made no secret about his intentions of monetarily and militarily aiding the Afghan Mujahideen with major assistance from the United States.

American president Jimmy Carter offered $400 million aid package to Pakistan; Zia ridiculed the offer as "peanuts". Zia ultimately succeeded in winning an increased aid of $3.2 billion provided by Carter's successor Ronald Reagan.

During this meeting, the Director-General of the Directorate for Inter-Services Intelligence (ISI) then-Lieutenant-General Akhtar Abdur Rahman advocated for a covert operation in Afghanistan by arming Islamic Extremists. After this meeting, Zia authorised this operation under General Rahman, and it was later merged with Operation Cyclone, a programme funded by the United States and the Central Intelligence Agency (CIA).

In November 1982, Zia travelled to Moscow to attend the funeral of Leonid Brezhnev, the late General Secretary of the Communist Party of the Soviet Union. Soviet Foreign Minister Andrei Gromyko and new Secretary General Yuri Andropov met with Zia there. Andropov expressed indignation over Pakistan's support of the Afghan resistance against the Soviet Union and its satellite state, Socialist Afghanistan. Zia took his hand and assured him, "General Secretary, believe me, Pakistan wants nothing but very good relations with the Soviet Union". According to Gromyko, Zia's sincerity convinced them, but Zia's actions didn't live up to his words.

Zia reversed many of Bhutto's foreign policy initiatives by first establishing stronger links with the United States, Japan, and the Western world. Zia broke off relations with the socialist state and state capitalism became his major economic policy. US politician Charlie Wilson claims that he worked with Zia and the CIA to channel weapons to fighters in Afghanistan.

==== Iran–Iraq War ====
On 22 September 1980, the Iraqi invasion of Iran initiated a nearly eight-year long war between Iran and Iraq. In an effort to end the war and maintain unity of the Islamic world, Zia visited Tehran on 27 September and Baghdad on 29 September. Despite declaring neutrality, Zia maintained close relations with Iran and Pakistan sold weapons to Iran, which proved to be a main factor for the Iranian victory in the Tanker War.

==== Relationship with the United States ====
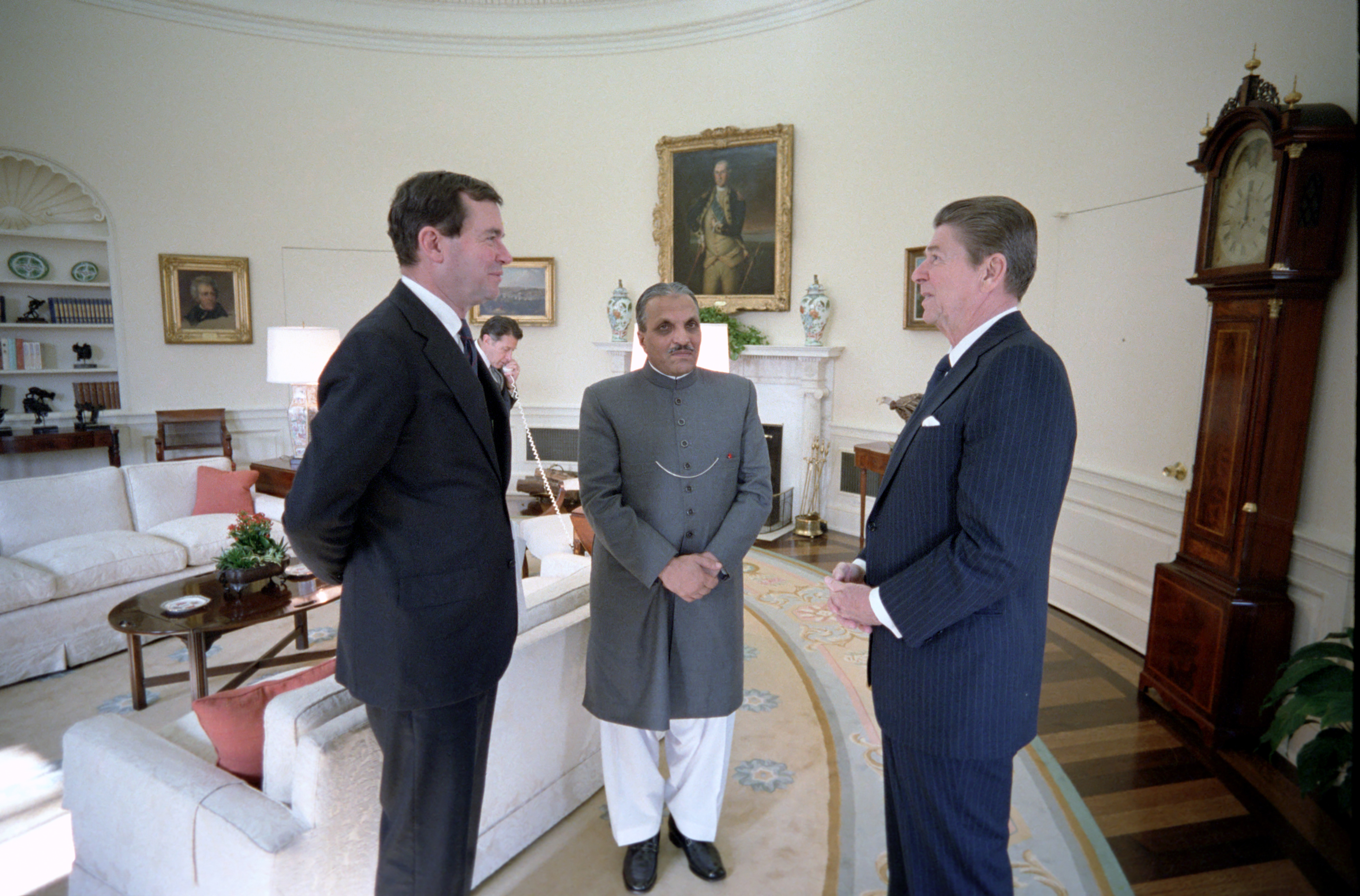
President Ronald Reagan and Bill Clark meeting with President Zia-ul-Haq, 1982

The United States, notably the Ronald Reagan administration, was an ardent supporter of Zia's military regime and a close ally of Pakistan's conservative-leaning ruling military establishment. The Reagan administration declared Zia's regime as the "front line" ally of the United States in the fight against the threat of Communism. American legislators and senior officials most notable were Zbigniew Brzezinski, Henry Kissinger, Charlie Wilson, Joanne Herring, and the civilian intelligence officers Michael Pillsbury and Gust Avrakotos, and senior US military officials General John William Vessey, and General Herbert M. Wassom, had been long associated with the Zia military regime where they had made frequent trips to Pakistan advising on expanding the idea of establishment in the political circle of Pakistan. Nominally, the American conservatism of Ronald Reagan's Republican Party influenced Zia to adopt his idea of Islamic conservatism as the primary line of his military government, forcefully enforcing the Islamic and other religious practices in the country.

The socialist orientation had greatly alarmed the capitalist forces in Pakistan and alarmed the United States who feared the loss of Pakistan as an ally in the cold war. Many of Pakistan's political scientists and historians widely suspected that the riots and coup against Zulfikar Ali Bhutto was orchestrated with help of the US Central Intelligence Agency (CIA) and the United States Government because United States growing fear of Bhutto's socialist policies which were seen as sympathetic towards the Soviet Union and had built a bridge that allowed Soviet Union to be involved in Pakistan, and had access through Pakistan's warm water port; something that the United States was unable to gain access since the establishment of Pakistan in 1947. Former US Attorney General Ramsey Clark widely suspected the United States' involvement in bringing down the Bhutto's government, and publicly accused the United States' Government after attending the trial. On the other hand, the United States refused any involvement in Bhutto's fall, and argued that it was Bhutto who had alienated himself over the five years. While witnessing the dramatic fall of Bhutto, one US diplomat in American Embassy in Islamabad wrote that:

During Bhutto's five years in Pakistan's helm, Bhutto had retained an emotional hold on the poor masses who had voted him overwhelmingly in 1970s general elections. At the same time, however, Bhutto had many enemies. The socialist economics and nationalization of major private industries during his first two years on office had badly upsets the Business circles.... An ill-considered decision to take over the wheat-milling, rice-husking, sugar mills, and cotton-gaining, industries in July of 1976 had angered the small business owners and traders. Both leftists—socialists and communists, intellectuals, students, and trade unionists—felt betrayed by Bhutto's shift to centre-right wing conservative economics policies and by his growing collaboration with powerful feudal lords, Pakistan's traditional power brokers. After 1976, Bhutto's aggressive authoritarian personal style and often high-handed way of dealing with political rivals, dissidents, and opponents had also alienated many....

==== Nuclear proliferation ====
Soon after the coup, the clandestine nuclear energy project was no longer a secret to the outside world. Part of his strategy was the promotion of nuclear proliferation in anti-western states (such as North Korea, Iran, and communist China) to aid their own nuclear ambitions, to divert international attention which was difficult. In 1981, Zia contracted with China when he sent weapon-grade uranium to China and also built the centrifuge laboratory which increasingly enhanced the Chinese nuclear programme. This act encouraged Abdul Qadeer Khan, who allegedly tried to aid the Libyan nuclear programme but because Libya–Pakistan relations were strained, Khan was warned of serious consequences. This policy envisaged that this would deflect international pressure onto these countries, and Pakistan would be spared the international community's wrath.

After Zia's death, his successor General Mirza Aslam Beg, as Chief of Army Staff, encouraged Abdul Qadeer Khan and gave him a free hand to work with some like-minded nations such as North Korea, Iran and Libya which also wanted to pursue their nuclear ambitions for a variety of reasons. In 2004, Abdul Qadeer Khan's dismissal from the nuclear weapons programme was considered a face-saving exercise by the Pakistan Armed Forces and political establishment under the then Chief of Army Staff and President General Pervez Musharraf. Zia's nuclear proliferation policy had a deep impact on the world, especially anti-western states, most nominally North Korea and Iran. In the 2000s (decade), North Korea would soon follow the same suit after it was targeted by the international community for its on-going nuclear programme. In the 2000s (decade), North Korea attempted to aid the Syrian and Iranian nuclear programme in the 1990s. The North Korean connection to the Syrian nuclear programme was exposed in 2007 by Israel in its successful strategic operation, Orchard, which resulted in them sabotaging the Syrian nuclear programme as well as the deaths of 10 senior North Korean scientists who were aiding the nuclear programme.

=== Dismissal of the Junejo government and call for new elections ===
As time passed, the legislature wanted to have more freedom and power and by the beginning of 1988, rumours about the differences between Prime Minister Muhammad Khan Junejo and Zia were rife.

It is said by some that Zia-Junejo rift was encouraged by late Mahboob-ul-Haq and Junejo's insistence on signing the Geneva Accords without deciding the composition of next government of Afghanistan before Soviet withdrawal. Junejo also gave Benazir a seat next to him in parleys before that. Junejo did not strengthen the Islamisation drive and rather weakened it. His era led to serious disturbances in Karachi and ultimately Karachi went into the secular control of MQM from Jamaat-e-Islami.

The Ojhri Camp disaster had irreversibly weakened Zia. Junejo was committed to conducting an investigation into the camp disaster. After the defeat of the Soviets, the United States wanted to audit the ammunition and missiles supplied to Pakistan for the Mujahideen, most of which has been stored by Pakistan for future targets against India or for other military purposes.

On 29 May 1988, Zia dissolved the National Assembly and removed the prime minister. Junejo's decision to sign the Geneva Accord against the wishes of Zia, and his open declarations of removing any military personnel found responsible for an explosion at a munitions dump at Ojhri Camp, proved to be some of the major factors responsible for his removal.

Zia promised to hold elections in 1988 after the dismissal of Junejo government. He said that he would hold elections within the next 90 days. The late Zulfikar Ali Bhutto's daughter Benazir Bhutto had returned from exile earlier in 1986, and had announced that she would be contesting the elections. With Bhutto's popularity somewhat growing, and a decrease in international aid following the Soviet withdrawal from Afghanistan, Zia was in an increasingly difficult political situation.

== Family and personal life ==
On 10 August 1950, he married his cousin Shafiq Jahan in Lahore. Begum Shafiq Zia died on 5 January 1996. Zia is survived by his sons, Muhammad Ijaz-ul-Haq (born 1953), who went into politics and became a cabinet minister in the government of Nawaz Sharif, and Anwar-ul-Haq (born 1960), and his daughters, Zain (born 1972), a special needs child, Rubina Saleem, who is married to a Pakistani banker and has been living in the United States since 1980, and Quratulain Zia who currently lives in London, and is married to Pakistani doctor, Adnan Majid.

His cousin Mian Abdul Waheed has served as diplomat, being Pakistan's ambassador to Germany and Italy, also playing a major role in the country becoming a nuclear power.

== Death ==
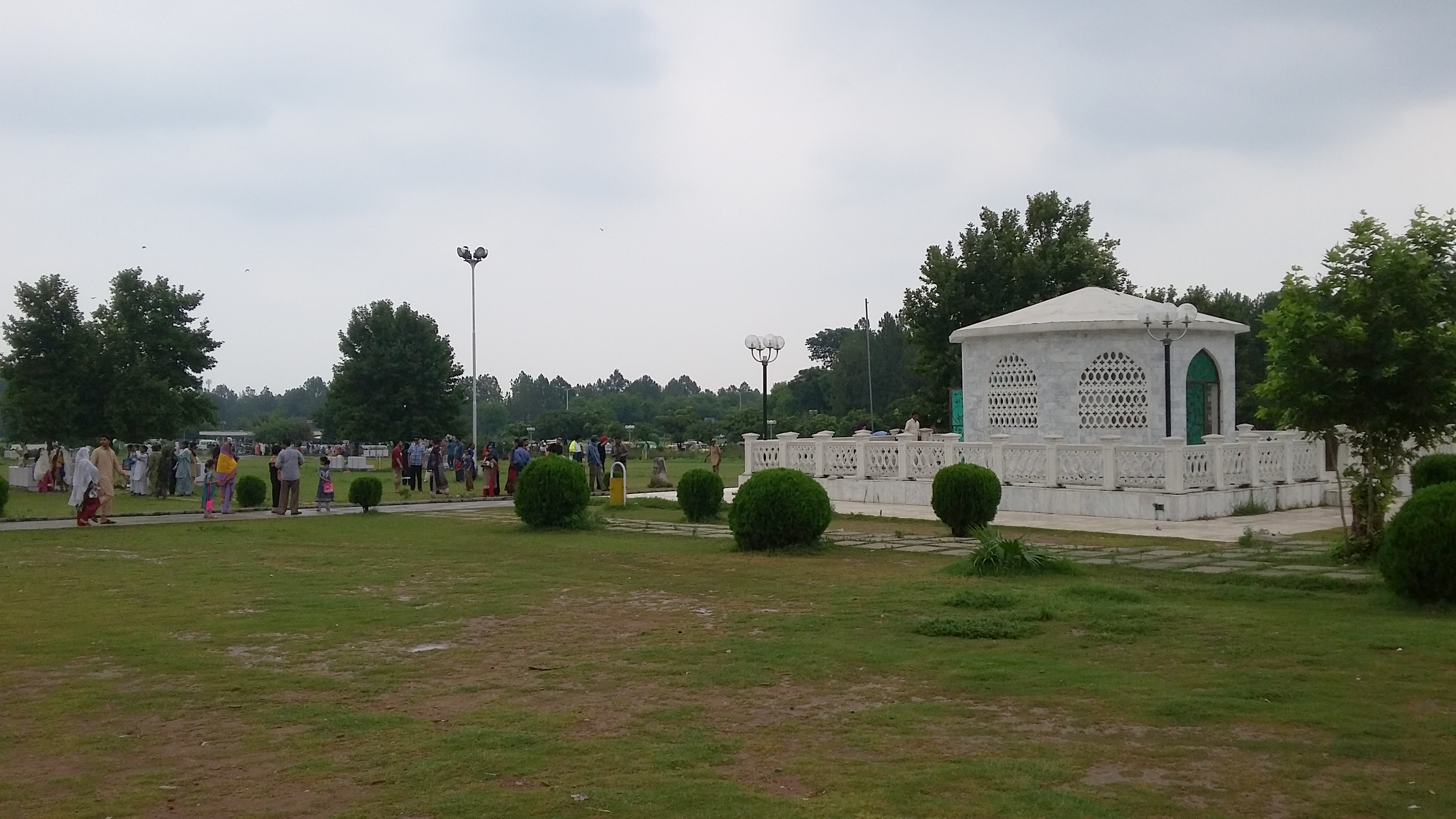
Zia ul Haq Tomb in Islamabad

Zia died in a plane crash on 17 August 1988. After witnessing a US M1 Abrams tank demonstration in Bahawalpur, Zia had left the city in the Punjab province by C-130B Hercules aircraft. The aircraft departed from Bahawalpur Airport and was expected to reach Islamabad International Airport. Shortly after a smooth takeoff, the control tower lost contact with the aircraft. Witnesses who saw the plane in the air afterward claim it was flying erratically, then nosedived and exploded on impact. In addition to Zia, 29 others died in the plane crash, including Chairman Joint Chiefs of Staff Committee General Akhtar Abdur Rahman, close associate of Zia, Brigadier Siddique Salik, the American ambassador to Pakistan Arnold Lewis Raphel and General Herbert M. Wassom, the head of the US military aid mission to Pakistan. Ghulam Ishaq Khan, the Senate chairman, announced Zia's death on radio and TV. Conditions surrounding his death have given rise to many conspiracy theories. There is speculation that the Soviet Union (in retaliation for Pakistani support of the mujahideen in Afghanistan) or an alliance of them and internal groups within Zia's military were behind the incident.

A board of inquiry was set up to investigate the crash. It concluded 'the most probable cause of the crash was a criminal act of sabotage perpetrated in the aircraft'. It also suggested that poisonous gases were released which incapacitated the passengers and crew, which would explain why no Mayday signal was given. There was also speculation into other facts involving the details of the investigation. A flight recorder (black box) was not located after the crash even though previous C-130 aircraft did have them installed.

His funeral was held on 19 August 1988 near Islamabad. Nearly one million mourners joined in chants of "Zia ul-Haq, you will live as long as the sun and moon remain above." His remains were laid to rest in a 4-by-10-foot (1.2 by 3.0 m) dirt grave in front of the Faisal Mosque that Zia and the Saudi government had built as a symbol of Pakistani-Saudi friendship. Also in attendance was his successor President Ghulam Ishaq Khan, chiefs of staff of armed forces, chairman joint chiefs, and other high military and civil officials. Former US Secretary of State George P. Shultz also laid a floral wreath at Zia's grave.

Well, he was a great loss...He is a martyr, and was a great man.

— George P. Shultz, 1988,

== Legacy ==
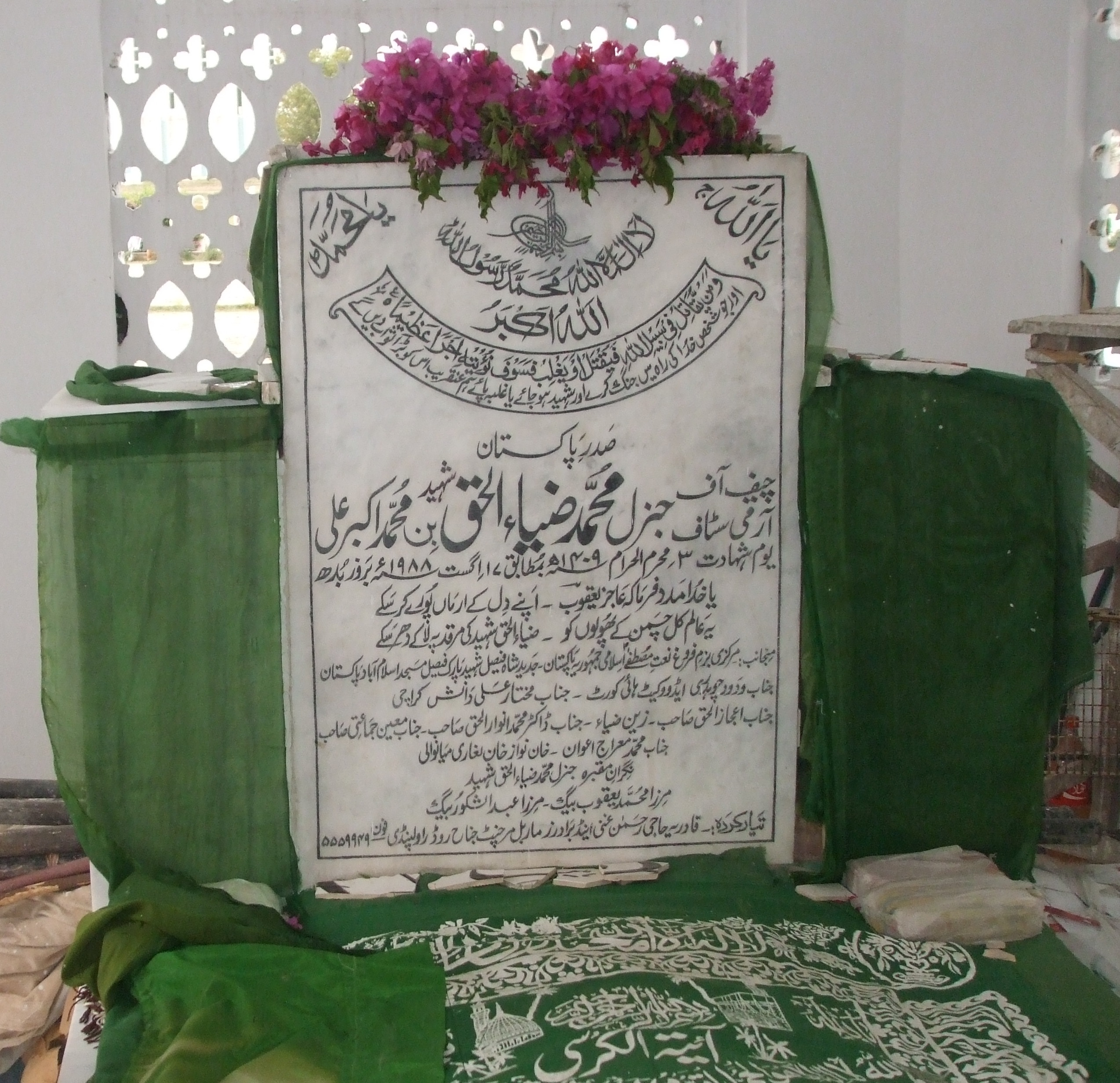
Grave stone of Zia's grave

=== In Pakistan ===
Even after his death, Zia-ul-Haq remained a highly polarising figure in the country's history. Zia-ul-Haq's legacy remains a most toxic, enduring, and tamper-proof legacy, according to the editorial written in Dawn. He is also praised for defeating the Soviets. Indian journalist Kallol Bhattacherjee, an author of a book on Afghanistan, said:

"There will not be another Zia in South Asia. He was unique and multidimensional like all complex characters of South Asian history. I admire Zia's guts, though not his methods, especially in regards to Islam. He successfully took on nuclear India and changed the balance of power that Indira Gandhi created in the 1971 war and broke all rules to acquire nuclear weapons for Pakistan."

Historians and political scientists widely discussed and studied his policy making skills, some authors noting him as "The Ringmaster", "Master of Illusion" and "Master Tactician". However, his most remembered and enduring legacy was his indirect involvement and military strategies, by proxy supporting the Mujahidin, against the USSR's war in Afghanistan. His reign also helped the conservatives to rise at the national politics against Benazir Bhutto. He is also noted as being one of Pakistan's most successful generals, placing the armed forces in charge of the country's affairs. During his regime, western styles in hair, clothing, and music flooded the country. The 1980s gave birth to Pakistani rock music, which expressed Pakistani nationalism in the country.

To this day, Zia remains a polarising figure in Pakistan's history, credited with preventing wider Soviet incursions into the region as well as economic prosperity, but decried for weakening democratic institutions, passing laws encouraging religious intolerance, and depreciating the rupee with managed float policies. He is also cited for promoting the early political career of Nawaz Sharif, who would be thrice elected Prime Minister.

With the passing of the Eighteenth Amendment to the Constitution of Pakistan (2010), the executive powers General Zia had legislated were permanently removed from the Constitution of Pakistan.

=== Outside Pakistan ===
Zia is credited with stopping an expected Soviet invasion of Pakistan. Former Saudi intelligence chief Prince Turki Al-Faisal, who worked with Zia during the 1980s against the Soviets, described Zia in the following words: "He was a very steady and smart person with a geo-strategic mind, particularly after the invasion by Soviets. He was very dedicated in preventing the Soviet invasion of Pakistan." Bruce Riedel, a former CIA analyst and author specializing in the Middle East, wrote that "in many ways, the Afghan war was Zia's war", in the sense that Zia pushed the Americans, initially reluctant and even skeptical, to participate in the proxy war against the Soviets. Riedel added: "Zia ul-Haq was not only a pivotal figure in the history of his country and the war in Afghanistan, he was also a pivotal figure in the final stage of the Cold War, which had dominated global politics for almost half a century."

=== Portrayals in popular culture ===
Zia has been portrayed in English language popular culture a number of times including:

- In the novel Shame (1983) by British-Indian author Salman Rushdie, the character of general Raza Hyder shows strong parallels to Zia.
- In the comic Shattered Visage (1988–1989), it is implied that Zia's death was orchestrated by the same intelligence agency that ran The Village from the show The Prisoner (1967).
- Zia is portrayed by Indian actor Om Puri in the 2007 Hollywood film Charlie Wilson's War.
- Zia is caricatured as one of the main protagonists in Mohammed Hanif's 2008 satirical novel A Case of Exploding Mangoes which is loosely based around the events of his death.
- The oppressive regime of Zia and the execution of Zulfikar Ali Bhutto was referenced in the book Songs of Blood and Sword (2010), a non-fiction memoir by Murtaza Bhutto's daughter Fatima Bhutto.
- Zia is portrayed by Indian actor Kavi Raz in the 2021 spy thriller film Bell Bottom.
- Zia is portrayed by Indian actor Ashwath Bhatt in the 2023 Netflix action-thriller film Mission Majnu.
- Zia is portrayed by Indian actor Mukesh Rishi in the 2025 JioHotstar series Salakaar based on National Security Advisor of India Ajit Doval's covert mission in Pakistan in the 1970s.

== Awards and decorations ==

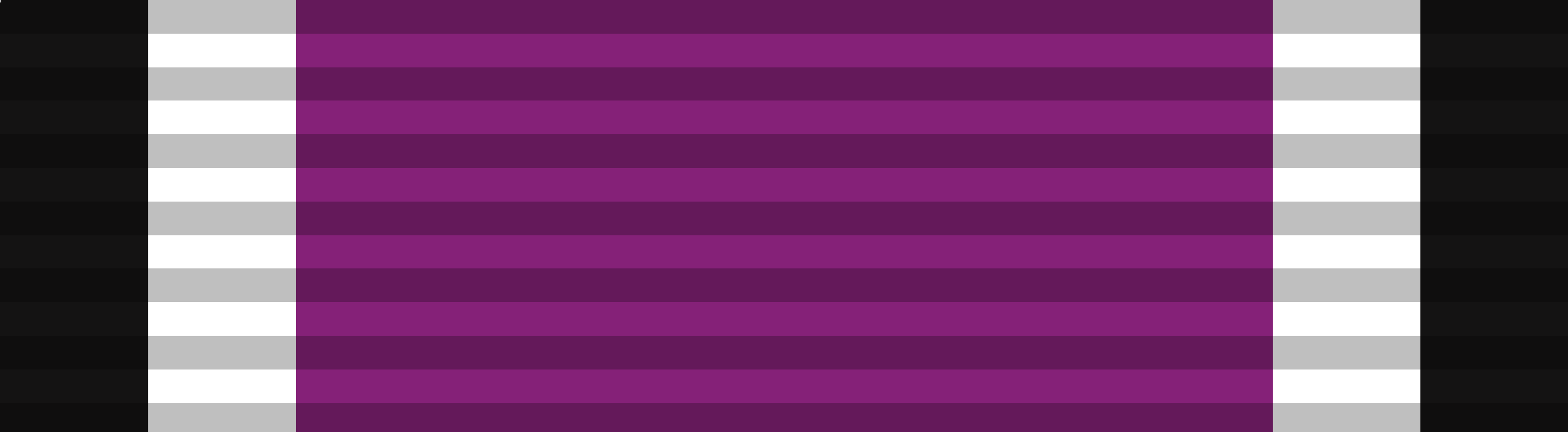

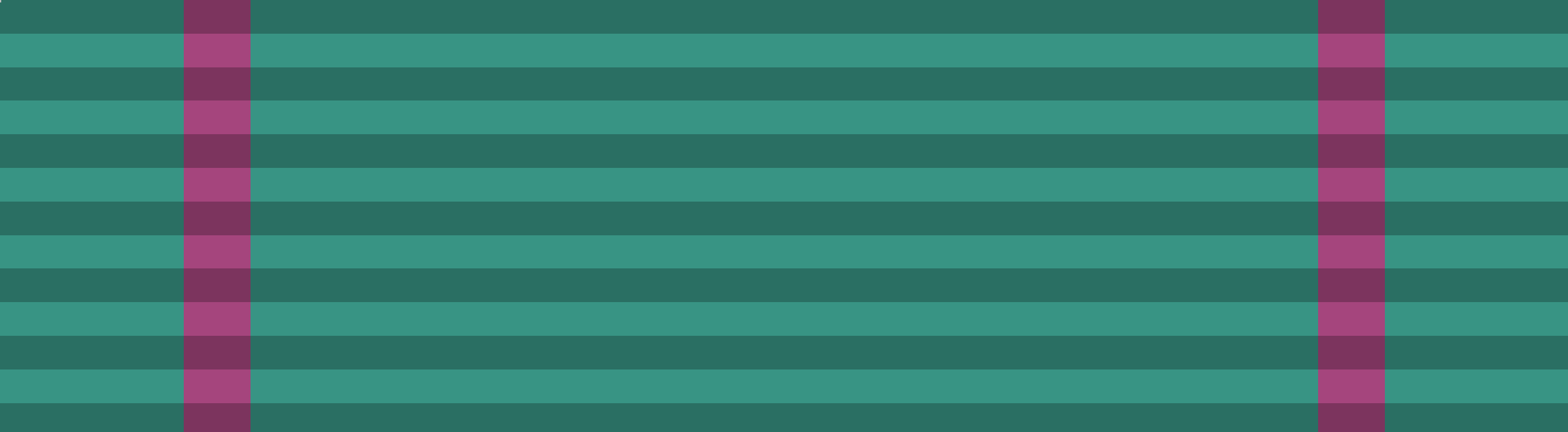

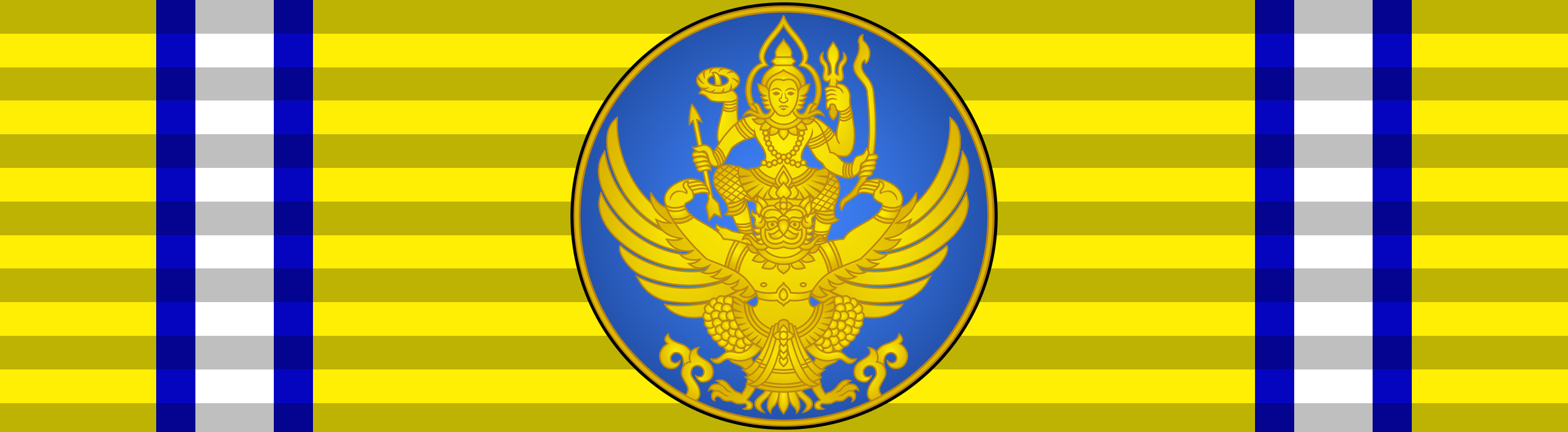

| | Sitara-e-Harb 1965 War (War Star 1965) | Sitara-e-Harb 1971 War (War Star 1971) | |
| Tamgha-e-Jang 1965 War (War Medal 1965) | Tamgha-e-Jang 1971 War (War Medal 1971) | Pakistan Tamgha (Pakistan Medal) 1947 | Tamgha-e-Sad Saala Jashan-e- Wiladat-e-Quaid-e-Azam (100th Birth Anniversary of Muhammad Ali Jinnah) 1976 |
| Hijri Tamgha (Hijri Medal) 1979 | Tamgha-e-Jamhuria (Republic Commemoration Medal) 1956 | Order of Independence (Jordan) 1971 | Order of the Star of Jordan (1971) |
| Order of the Rajamitrabhorn (Thailand) | Burma Star | War Medal1939-1945 | General Service Medal World War 2 (Awarded in 1945) |

Foreign Awards
| Jordan | Order of Al-Hussein bin Ali |
| Thailand | Order of the Rajamitrabhorn |
| Jordan | Order of the Star of Jordan |
| Jordan | Order of Independence |
| United Kingdom | Burma Star |
| United Kingdom | War Medal 1939-1945 |
| United Kingdom | General Service Medal - (World War 2) |
| Yugoslavia | Order of the Yugoslav Great Star |

== See also ==
- Joanne Herring
- Human Rights in Pakistan under General Zia-ul-Haq
- Politics of Pakistan
- Line of succession to the President of Pakistan
- List of presidents of Pakistan
- Military dictatorship
- Oppression under the regime of General Zia-ul-Haq
- Corporate capitalisation

== Bibliography ==
- Ahmed, Manzooruddin (1980). Contemporary Pakistan Politics, Economy, and Society. Carolina Academic Press. ISBN 9780890891261.
- Ali, Tariq (2007). The Leopard and the Fox: A Pakistani Tragedy. Seagull Books. ISBN 978-1-905422-29-6.
- Arif, Khalid Mahmud (1995). Working with Zia: Pakistan's Power Politics 1977–1988. Oxford University Press. ISBN 0-19-577570-8.
- Arif, Khalid Mahmud (2001). Khaki Shadows: Pakistan 1947–1997. Oxford University Press. ISBN 0-19-579396-X.
- Ayub, Muhammad (2005). An Army, its Role and Rule: A History of the Pakistan Army from Independence to Kargil 1947–1999. Pittsburgh: RoseDog Books. ISBN 0-8059-9594-3.
- Bhutto, Fatima (2000). Songs of Blood and Sword. Dhaka: University Press Ltd. ISBN 978-0-670-08280-3.
- Coll, Steve (2004). Ghost Wars: The Secret History of the CIA, Afghanistan and Bin Laden. Penguin Books. ISBN 978-1-59420-007-6.
- Crile, George (2002). Charlie Wilson's War: The Extraordinary Story of How the Wildest Man in Congress and a Rogue CIA Agent Changed the History of Our Times. Atlantic Monthly Press. ISBN 978-0-87113-854-5.
- Duncan, Emma (1989). Breaking the Curfew: A Political Journey through Pakistan. Michael Joseph. ISBN 978-0-7181-2989-7.
- Haqqani, Husain (2010) [2005], Pakistan: Between Mosque and Military, Carnegie Endowment, ISBN 978-0-87003-285-1
- Hussain, Mir Zohair (2016). "Islam in Pakistan under Bhutto and Zia-ul-Haq". In Mutalib, Hussin; Hashmi, Taj ul-Islam (eds.). Islam, Muslims and the Modern State: Case-Studies of Muslims in Thirteen Countries. Springer. pp. 47–79. ISBN 9781349142088.
- Hussain, Mushahid (1990). Pakistan's Politics: The Zia Years. Lahore: Progressive Publishers. OCLC 22854226.
- Hussain, Syed (2000). Ayub, Bhutto, and Zia: How They Fell Victim to Their Own Plans. Lahore: Sang-e-Meel Publications. ISBN 9789693510805.
- Hyman, Anthony; Ghayur, Muhammed; Kaushik, Naresh (1989), Pakistan, Zia and After--, New Delhi: Abhinav Publications, ISBN 978-81-7017-253-6
- Jones, Owen Bennett (2002). Pakistan : eye of the storm. New Haven and London: Yale University Press. ISBN 0300101473.
- Kux, Dennis (2001). The United States and Pakistan, 1947-2000: Disenchanted Allies. Johns Hopkins University Press. ISBN 9780801865725.
- Lamb, Christina (1992). Waiting for Allah: Pakistan's Struggle for Democracy. London: Penguin. ISBN 978-0-14-014334-8.
- Markey, Daniel S. (2013). No Exit from Pakistan: America's Tortured Relationship with Islamabad. Cambridge University Press. ISBN 9781107045460.
- Mazari, Sherbaz (1999). A Journey to Disillusionment. Oxford University Press. ISBN 978-0-19-579769-5.
- Rudolf, Peters (2005). Crime and Punishment in Islamic Law: Theory and Practice from the Sixteenth Century. The Cambridge University Press. ISBN 9781139445344.
- Riedel, Bruce (2014). What We Won: America's Secret War in Afghanistan, 1979–1989. Brookings Institution Press. ISBN 978-0-8157-2595-4.
- Sardar, Ziauddin (2004). Desperately Seeking Paradise: Journeys of a Sceptical Muslim. London: Granta Books. ISBN 978-1-86207-650-1.
- Waseem, Mohammad (1987). Pakistan Under Martial Law, 1977-1985. Vanguard Books. ISBN 9789694023670.
- Wynbrandt, James (2009). A Brief History of Pakistan. Facts on File. pp. 216–7. ISBN 9780816061846.
- Yousaf, Mohammad; Adkin, Mark (1992). The Bear Trap: Afghanistan's Untold Story. London: L. Cooper. ISBN 0-85052-267-6.
- Zaeef, Abdul Salam (2011), My Life with the Taliban, Hurst, ISBN 978-1-84-904152-2

Military offices
| Preceded by Zulfikar Ali Bhutto | Colonel Commandant of Army Armoured Corps; 1974–1978 | Succeeded by Ali Jan Mehsud |
| Preceded by Tikka Khan | Chief of Army Staff; 1976–1988 | Succeeded by Mirza Aslam Beg |
Political offices
| Preceded by Zulfikar Ali Bhutto | Minister of Defence; 1978 | Succeeded by Ali Ahmed Khan Talpur |
| Preceded by Ali Ahmed Khan Talpur | Minister of Defence; 1985 | Succeeded by Muhammad Khan Junejo |
| Preceded by Fazal Ilahi Chaudhry | President of Pakistan; 1978–1988 | Succeeded by Ghulam Ishaq Khan |
