= Zain Zia =

Pakistani public figure (born 1972)

Personal details
- Born: 25 July 1972 (age 54) Multan, Pakistan
- Parent(s): Muhammad Zia-ul-Haq; Begum Shafiq Zia

Zain Zia (Urdu: زین ضیا; born 25 July 1972) is a Pakistani public figure, philanthropist, and disability rights activist who is the youngest daughter of former Pakistani President Zia-ul-Haq, and former First Lady Shafiq Zia.

== Life and career ==
=== Early life ===
Zia was born on 25 July 1972 in Multan, to Shafiq Zia and Muhammad Zia-ul-Haq, the President of Pakistan from 1978 to 1988. Her speech and hearing disabilities inspired the Zia government's passage of the Employment and Rehabilitation Ordinance in 1981, a law that aimed to improve the lives of Pakistanis living with disabilities through the disbursement of federal funds and employment and educational quotas.

Zia is also credited with inspiring the acquisition of the elephant Kaavan for Pakistan. According to an account she gave to the BBC, her interest in elephants began after watching the Bollywood film Haathi Mere Saathi. Zia recounted that her father surprised her with a young elephant, a gift from Sri Lanka to Pakistan, who was transferred from Sri Lanka's Pinnawala Elephant Orphanage to the Islamabad Zoo in Pakistan in 1985. According to Sri Lankan elephant conservation expert Ravi Corea, Kaavan may have been presented to the Pakistani government in recognition of its support for the Sri Lankan military during an insurgency. However, the precise circumstances surrounding the elephant's transfer, including the reasons for the gift and whether Kaavan was an orphan, remain unclear.

During her first visit to India in the 1980s, Zia was accorded the status of a state guest. Her visit in 2004, was kept more private. Reflecting on her earlier trip, Zia recalled meeting then Indian Prime Minister Indira Gandhi, whom she described as "very sweet".

Her father was killed in a plane crash on 17 August 1988. Subsequently, she resided with her mother, Begum Shafiq Zia, who lived on an army pension, rental income from a house owned by her late husband, and support from her son, a physician who lived with her. Her two sisters resided abroad, one in the United States and the other in Saudi Arabia. Her mother died suddenly on 5 January 1996 aged 64, at the Cromwell Hospital in London.

=== Friendship with Shatrughan Sinha ===
In June 2004, Zia attended an event at the invitation of Shatrughan Sinha, a close friend of Zia's since Sinha's visit to Pakistan in 1985, when Zia's father was president. The event, a music launch for the film Dobara, took place in Mumbai and was attended by several prominent personalities, including Mahesh Bhatt and Sinha, although much of the press attention focused on Zia. The film also featured a Pakistani connection, with actor Muammar Rana appearing in a cameo role. Speaking at the event, Zia said it was her third visit to India. She also expressed her fondness for Hindi cinema, naming Dil To Pagal Hai as her favourite film.

In August 2004, actor and politician Sinha, reflecting on his eight-year association with former Pakistani president Zia-ul-Haq, stated that his close relationship with the Zia family had at one point attracted the attention of Indian intelligence agencies. He recalled being questioned about his ties to the family but said he was able to avoid extensive scrutiny through his influence in India. In an interview with The News, Sinha said that political and military tensions between India and Pakistan had not affected his relationship with the Zia family. He noted that his visits to Pakistan during periods of strained bilateral relations had attracted questions from the media and the public in both countries. Sinha, who had been accorded state guest status by General Zia during his visits to Pakistan, reiterated his longstanding friendship with the family. He made these remarks while visiting Pakistan to attend the birthday celebrations of Zain Zia, whom he described as being like a sister to him.

In 2019, Zia launched her YouTube channel, where she regularly shares lifestyle vlogs featuring family gatherings, birthday celebrations, and updates on her social and charitable activities.
