= Shikva =

Single by Faakhir

from the album Jee Chahay
- Released: 2014
- Recorded: 2011
- Genre: Pop; Pakistani
- Length: 5:55 (2011); 4:47 (2014)
- Label: Fire Records
- Songwriter: Prashant Vasal
- Producer: Fakhir

Faakhir singles chronology
"Baylia" (2013)	"Shikva" (2014)

"Shikva" (Urdu: شکوہ ; lit. Querulousness or Complain ) is a song by Pakistani recording artist Faakhir Mehmood from his fourth studio album Jee Chahay (2011). It was released in the Pakistan as a digital download in 2011 and revised addition in 2014. "Shikva" is a love-inspired balled that details the protagonist pleading with his lover to leave the drug addiction. The song was written by Prashant Vasal an Indian poet, while composed and produced by Fakhir himself and directed by Adnan Khandar.

In 2011 release, song wasn't a hit, but 2014 version by Faakhir tops the chart, making one of the most successful singles by singer. At 3rd Annual Hum Awards ceremony, it was nominated for Best Music Single for Faakhir and Best Music Video for Adnan Khandar.

== About the song ==
Sikva was first released with album in 2011 with the total track length of 5:55, it was a half musical balled and half Qawali and did average with topping charts, besides album most hit Baylia. In 2014, Fakhir re-released the song as a music single with dynamic music video, which got critical acclaim and attention.

== Composition ==
Fakhir has done the composition for both versions of song.

== Music video ==
Video deals with the issue of Drug addiction in Pakistan, and the synopsis of video is truly based content.

=== Theme ===
Music video officially states the following message at the end of video:

Drug abuse is a global problem. It knows no boundaries, it is everybody's problem... And prevention is the only solution.

=== Synopsis ===
Video deals with the elements of love, separation and nostalgia. Featuring super models Rizwan Ali Jaffri and Fouzia Aman as main protagonist. In which Female protagonist pleads to her love interest to leave the addiction, but he is unable to respond ending their relationship. He couldn't get over with their memories and he lends more into the addiction and finally while drunk lost in addiction of pain and lust he gets killed in a car accident.

=== Cast and Crew ===
- Lyricist: Prashant Vasl
- Producer: Faakhir
- Director: Adnan Khandar
- Composer: Faakhir
- Music: Shani and Kami
- Post: Haroon and Ghaffar
- Artist: Rizwan Ali Jaffri and Fouzia Aman

== Track listing ==
- CD single
1. "Shikva" — 5:55
- Digital download (2014 version)
1. "Shikva" featuring Rizwan Ali Jaffri and Fouzia Aman — 4:47
