= HIV/AIDS in Pakistan =

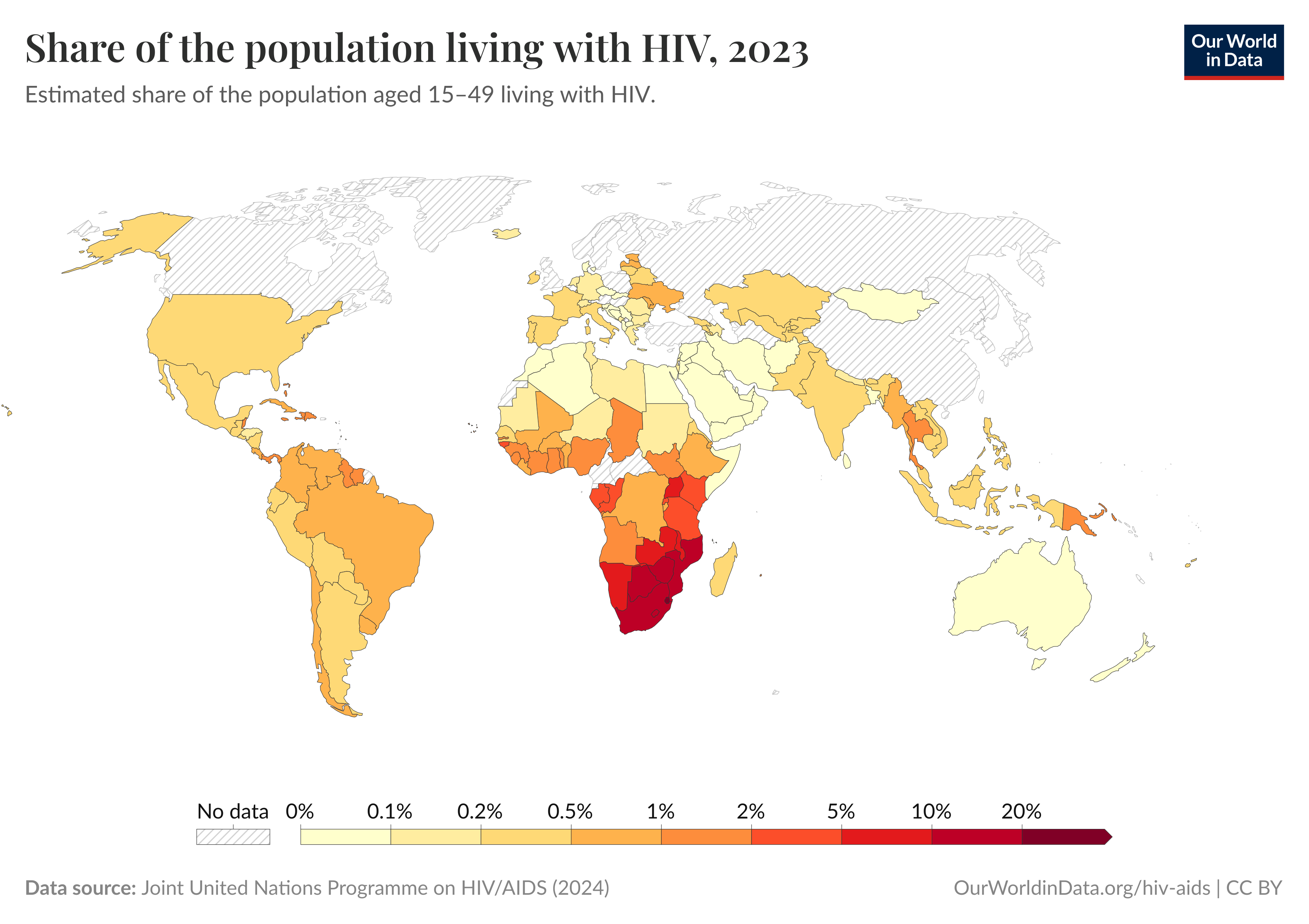
A map of global HIV prevalence, 2023

HIV is recognized as a health concern in Pakistan with the number of cases growing. Moderately high drug use and lack of acceptance that non-marital sex is common in the society have allowed the HIV epidemic to take hold in Pakistan, mainly among injecting drug users (IDU), male, female and transvestite sex workers (MSW, FSW and TSW) as well as the repatriated migrant workers. HIV infection can lead to AIDS that may become a major health issue.

By the mid-2000s, the number of HIV cases had increased to approximately 0,102 million. This number was estimated little over 4,000, as the HIV cases reported since 1986. The UN and government estimated the number of HIV/AIDS cases around 97,000 ranging from a lowest estimate of 46,000 to a highest estimate of 210,000.

More realistic estimates that are based on actual surveillance figures suggest that this number may be closer to 40,000–45,000. The 2008 prevalence of HIV infection in adults aged 15 to 49 was 0.1%. (0.05% if one accepts the lower estimates). Officials say that the majority of cases go unreported due to social taboos about sex and victims' fears of discrimination. The other reason for all the cases not being reported is that HIV is a disease either not systematically tested for or reported in the routine surveillance system.

== Evolving phases of HIV epidemic ==
HIV epidemic evolves in three phases. First phase is low prevalence, when prevalence of the disease is less than 5% in any high-risk group of the country. Second phase is concentrated epidemic when proportion of infected people in any high-risk group rises more than 5%. Third and last phase of epidemic is generalized epidemic when prevalence of HIV infection rises over 1% among blood donor or pregnant women. Like other Asian countries, Pakistan is following a comparable HIV epidemic trend having moved from 'low prevalence, high risk' to 'concentrated' epidemic in the early to mid-2000s.

In 2017, Pakistan's epidemic was primarily concentrated among two of the key population groups driving the epidemic. These are people who inject drugs, with a national prevalence of 27.2% (weighted prevalence of 37.8%); followed by transgender sex workers, standing at 5.2% and then 1.6% among male sex workers. The prevalence in female sex workers still remains low at 0.6%. The geographic trend of key populations is from major urban cities and provincial capitals, expanding over time to smaller cities and peripheries.

== Escalating epidemic - mainly in high risk groups ==
Pakistan faced a low prevalence phase of epidemic from 1987 to 2003. This may have been due to lack of formal surveillance systems, although no study found significant HIV in any group until 2002. In 2003, an outbreak of HIV among injection drug users in one city heralded the onset of HIV epidemic in the country. Since then different studies and the national HIV surveillance (which started in 2004) have confirmed an escalating epidemic among IDUs and more recently among male and transgender sex workers.

In 2008, the national average prevalence of HIV among IDUs is nearly 20%. Several cities also show concentrated epidemic among MSWs/ TSWs as well. As mentioned, HIV has astigma in Pakistan. This along with the absence of routine surveillance and testing for HIV in the health system, ascertaining the actual number will remain a challenge.

Other groups that also have HIV among them are truck drivers, expatriated migrant workers and wives of IDUs. The incidence rate are not known for the reasons mentioned above. Two studies of men from the general population: Faisel and Cleland and A Study of Bridging Populations (The Population Council/ NACP 2007) show no HIV and few STIs in this group. Similarly a study of women attending labor and delivery clinics in four cities had shown no HIV and rare STIs (NACP 2001). Blood donor screening data all over the country are suggesting low HIV infection in the blood donor population, albeit with some increasing trends in selected centers.

A number of factors may have contributed to keeping the overall transmission of HIV within the general population. One, Pakistan is a predominantly Muslim country with near universal circumcision. Secondly, taboos on sex may have led to a higher proportion of the need for non-marital sex to be met via sex between men, much from a smaller group of men within each person's acquaintance. Some of this is suggested by the fact that about 45% of all sex acts sold are by either male or transgender sex workers (HIV/AIDS Surveillance Project 2007). These factors may have led to a high rate of HIV transmission among MSM/MSW networks but may temporarily slow down the transmission of HIV to the rest of the population.

The low prevalence rate overall may be taken as a window of opportunity, still available and actions to curb any further disease spread should be roboust. It is worth mentioning that data is reported mainly from the public sector health facilities. While, the current health seeking behaviours and health system forces majority of the population to the private sector.

The table above shows the sample distribution of high risk group done by the NACP in 2017.

Province	IDUs	MSWs	TSWs	FSWs
Punjab	2,248	1,439	1,786	3,347
Sindh	2,213	1,440	1,337	1,472
KPK	325	436	718	712
Baluchistan	730	359	338	345

== Disease transmission by inappropriate use of therapeutic injections ==
A major factor that must be accounted for in the overall HIV transmission scenario is the rampant use of therapeutic injections, often with non-sterile injection equipment. There are an estimated 800 million therapeutic injections given annually in Pakistan or approximately 4.5 per capita. This is among the highest in the World. A small but significant proportion of these are reused. This has led to the prevalence of Hepatitis C infection (which is nearly exclusively transmitted via blood exposures) to become >5% nationwide, although this seems to have stabilized at a national level. Conservatively this suggests around 150,000 new HCV infections annually, leading to the conclusion that HIV can also potentially spread via this route as well. Recent community based outbreaks in Punjab suggest that the process may have already started.

== National response to HIV epidemic ==
Pakistan's response to HIV/AIDS began in 1987 with the establishment of a Federal Committee on AIDS by the Ministry of Health. The national AIDS control Program was then established. Its objectives are the prevention of HIV transmission among specific population sub-groups, safe blood transfusions, reduced STI transmission, establishment of surveillance, training of health staff, research and behavioral studies, and development of program management.

The prevention efforts received a major boost since 2004 when a World Bank loan/grant allowed the Ministry of Health, and the provincial Departments of Health, to start a program which seeks to provide HIV prevention services to IDUs, sex workers and truckers; perform advocacy and communication for the general public and covers significant proportion of the national blood supply for HIV, HBV and HCV screening. This "Enhanced HIV/AIDS Control Program" has been able to establish these services using NGOs to perform the interventions in most large cities although the quality of the services as well as the completeness of their "coverage" remains low.

The IDU programs in Punjab are performing the best with over 70% coverage of target populations with services in 4 cities. Programs for sex workers lag somewhat but are bolstered by the fact that the metropolises have higher levels of knowledge and safer behaviors. The overall levels of coverage of services remain low at around 16% for IDUs and <10% for sex workers nationwide. The communication project has performed probably the least with only 44% of Pakistani women reporting ever hearing of the word "AIDS" in 2007. HIV treatment was started in 2005. Currently over 900 individuals receive free HIV medicines and tests from 9 public and 3 private sector facilities.

== Future of HIV in Pakistan and response ==
Going forward the Government of Pakistan has approved a 5-year plan that will be worth almost PKR 8 billion. A number of challenges will have to be met during this phase. The most immediate perhaps will be developing the methodology of measuring the impact of program interventions. A National M&E Framework has been developed but implementation on it has yet to start.

In 2001, to respond to this threat, the NACP in collaboration with Provincial programs and other partners developed its first national strategy framework that culminated in the establishment of first response, called Enhanced HIV and AIDS Control Project, that ended in 2008. This was followed by 2nd National strategic Framework that was more focussed to interventions in Key Populations. Pakistan then developed the 3rd Strategic Framework 2015-20 that focussed on quality HIV treatment and care services.

Lack of the ability to measure the outcomes or impact of interventions in real time (so that this knowledge can inform program direction) was likely the most important factor in the low performance of the first Enhanced Program. Other challenges that must be overcome include establishment of a transparent financial management and a smooth logistical and procurement system. Much of the Enhanced Program services are contracted out and delays in procurement of these services meant that many of the cities went without services for months to years. More complex (and longer term) challenges will include determining how to integrate many of HIV activities within other health activities, improve planning to anticipate future direction of the epidemic and its response and to enhance efficiency and effectiveness of the interventions.

For these research must become part of the interventions to guide their implementation using local context and to involve epidemiological tools such as routine analysis of available data and even mathematical modeling to guide program planning. After devolution in 2011 the Provinces mobilized their own resources that were mainly used to prevent the infection from establishing in Key Populations. The country also succeeded in getting three Global Fund grants and the present grant is more directed to strengthening HIV treatment care and support services to HIV positives and their families Message From NPM - National AIDS Control Programme.

The available information suggests a slower case detection and confirmation and any response services for the infected population. This may be resulting from the fact that HIV is mainly confined to high risk population mentioned above. It can not be ruled out mainly due to the strong stigma attached, main surveys focused only in the urban areas and general population not having access to free laboratory test.
