= Drug addiction in Pakistan =

Most of the illegal drugs in Pakistan come from neighbouring Afghanistan.

According to UN estimates, a few million people in the country are drug users. Cannabis is the most used drug. The rate of injection drug abuse has also increased significantly in Pakistan, sparking fears of an HIV epidemic. A 2013 report on drugs by the United Nations Office On Drugs And Crime (UNODC) stated that almost 6.7 million people are taking drugs in Pakistan. The report also revealed that people from the age of 15 to 64 use prescription drugs for non-medical purposes. In Pakistan, the alarming rise in drug addiction is evident, with more people succumbing to substance abuse than falling victim to terrorist attacks. The use of potent narcotics like heroin, cocaine, and other substances like hashish is widespread.

Despite the alarming increase, governmental response has been minimal. Few programs are active in the country to help drug addicts, while smuggling and availability of drugs in the country has gone almost unchecked. The Anti-Narcotics Force is the government agency responsible for tackling drug smuggling and use within Pakistan.

== Extent of the problem ==
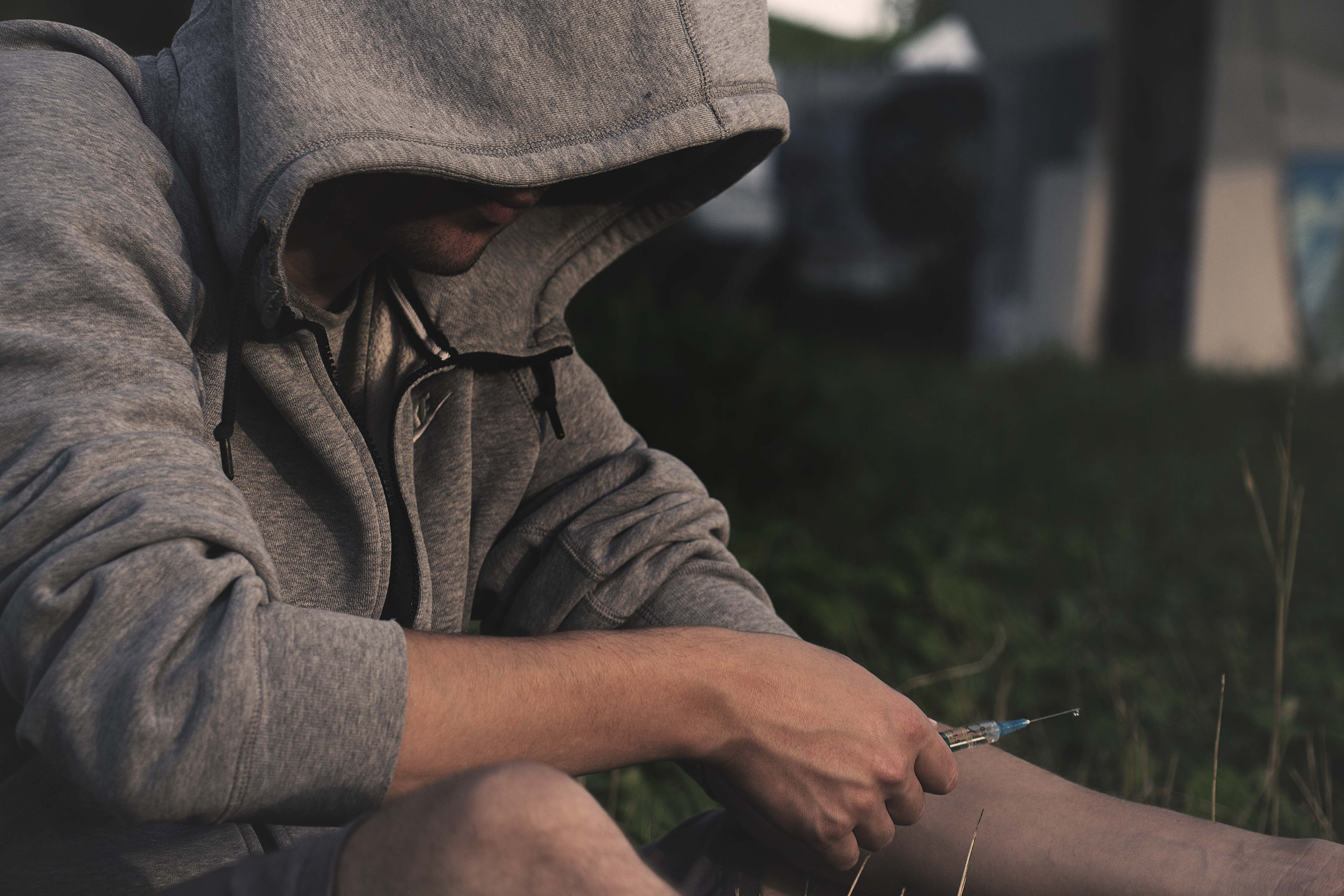

According to the United Nations Office on Drugs and Crime, Pakistan has 6.7 million drug users. Almost 2 million of these are addicts, amongst the highest numbers for any country in the world. According to a research article published in 2020 in Elsevier, the first step towards drug addiction starts with smoking. Researchers also state that drug usage in movies also influences the behaviour of drug consumption among university students.

Abuse of cannabis and heroin, both of which are extremely cheap and easy to get, is rife in the country. Most of the drugs come from Afghanistan, the country that is responsible for at least 75% of the world's heroin. The UNODC calculates that more than 800,000 Pakistanis between the ages of 15 and 64 use heroin regularly. It is also estimated that up to 44 tons of processed heroin are consumed annually in Pakistan. A further 110 tons of heroin and morphine from neighboring Afghanistan are trafficked through Pakistan to international markets. Furthermore, Pakistan's illegal drug trade is believed to generate up to $2 billion a year.

The number of cannabis users is particularly high in the Khyber Pakhtunkhwa province of Pakistan, which neighbors Afghanistan, where close to 11 percent of the population is hooked on drugs (mainly Cannabis). In 2013, the number of drug users in Balochistan was 280,000.

In Pakistan, the total number of drug addicts as per a UN report is 7.6 million, 78% of whom are male, while the remaining 22% are female. The number of these addicts is increasing at the rate of 40,000 per year, making Pakistan one of the most drug-affected countries in the world.

The number of injection drug users in the Punjab has also increased sharply in the recent years. In 2007, Pakistan had an estimated 90,000 injecting drug users, but the number had risen to around 500,000 by 2014. This increase has also been accompanied by an increase in HIV positivity. According to research, in 2005, about 11 percent of Pakistani drug users were HIV positive. That number had risen to 40 percent in 2011.

== Treatment and Specialist intervention ==
According to the survey report, treatment and specialist interventions were in short supply. During the period under review, treatment was available to less than 30,000 drug users.

The Anti-Narcotics Force is a federal executive bureau of the Government of Pakistan, tasked with combating drug smuggling and drug use within Pakistan.

== See also ==
- Smuggling in Pakistan
- Organised crime in Pakistan
- Hudood Ordinances#Prohibition (alcohol) Order
- Smoking in Pakistan
