= If I Am Assassinated =

1979 prison memoir by Zulfikar Ali Bhutto

- Author: Zulfikar Ali Bhutto
- Language: English
- Subject: Zulfikar Ali Bhutto; Politics of Pakistan; 1977 Pakistani military coup
- Genre: Political memoir
- Publisher: Vikas Publishing House
- Publication date: 1979
- Publication place: India
- Media type: Print
- Pages: 240
- ISBN: 978-0-7069-0807-7

If I Am Assassinated is a 1979 prison memoir and political defence statement by Pakistani prime minister Zulfikar Ali Bhutto who was executed later that year. Published by Vikas Publishing House in New Delhi, with U.S. distribution by Advent House in New York, the book comprises documents presented to the Supreme Court of Pakistan during Bhutto's appeal against his death sentence.

Written while Bhutto was confined in Rawalpindi District Jail, the book is primarily a rejoinder to the military regime's White Paper on the Conduct of the General Elections in March 1977 and White Paper on Misuse of Media. It argues that the charges and official propaganda against Bhutto were politically motivated and places his trial within a wider critique of martial law, the military's role in politics, and Pakistan's foreign and domestic crises.

== Synopsis ==
The book opens with a lengthy introduction and then proceeds through thirteen chapters, including "White Paper or White Lies?", "Rigged or Fair?", "Foreign Hand", and "The Death Cell and History". Bhutto presents the text as a response written under severe prison conditions, stating that he had limited access to materials while attempting to rebut the allegations circulated by the regime.

Much of the work disputes official claims that the Pakistan Peoples Party rigged the 1977 general election and misused state media. It also broadens into a political argument about the legitimacy of martial law, the role of the army in Pakistan, relations with foreign powers, and Bhutto's own place in the country's history.

== Reception ==
If I Am Assassinated was reviewed by political scientist Lawrence Ziring in The Journal of Asian Studies in 1981. The book was also reviewed by India Today.

Later historians of Pakistan have treated the book as an important primary source on Bhutto's overthrow, trial, and final months in prison.
