= The Myth of Independence =

1969 book by Zulfikar Ali Bhutto

- Author: Zulfikar Ali Bhutto
- Language: English
- Subject: Foreign relations of Pakistan; India–Pakistan relations Cold War
- Genre: Non-fiction
- Publisher: Oxford University Press
- Publication date: 1969
- Publication place: Pakistan
- Media type: Print
- Pages: 188
- ISBN: 978-0-19-215167-4

The Myth of Independence is a 1969 book by Pakistani politician Zulfikar Ali Bhutto on Pakistan's foreign policy and international position. Published by Oxford University Press, the book examines Pakistan's relations with India, the United States, the Soviet Union, and the People's Republic of China, and argues that formal sovereignty did not by itself guarantee real independence for smaller states.

The book was written after the Indo-Pakistani War of 1965 and is centered on Pakistan's search for autonomy in a world dominated by great-power rivalry.

== Synopsis ==
The book includes chapters such as "The Struggle for Equality", "Global Powers and Small Nations", and "American Attitudes towards Partition and Indian Neutralism". It develops a critique of Pakistan's earlier "special relationship" with the United States and argues for a foreign policy based more firmly on national interests than on alliance dependence.

It advocated a harder line toward India, closer ties with China, and a reassessment of Pakistan's relationship with the United States in the context of the Cold War.

== Reception ==
In International Affairs, Sidney Isaacs described the book as well-written and highly interesting and praised Bhutto's approach as lively and perceptive. The book was also reviewed by political scientist Wayne Wilcox in both The Journal of Asian Studies and Political Science Quarterly.
