= Zulfikar Ali Bhutto =

4th President and 9th Prime Minister of Pakistan (1928–1979)

Zulfikar Ali Bhutto NPk HPk
- ذُوالفِقار علی بُھٹّو
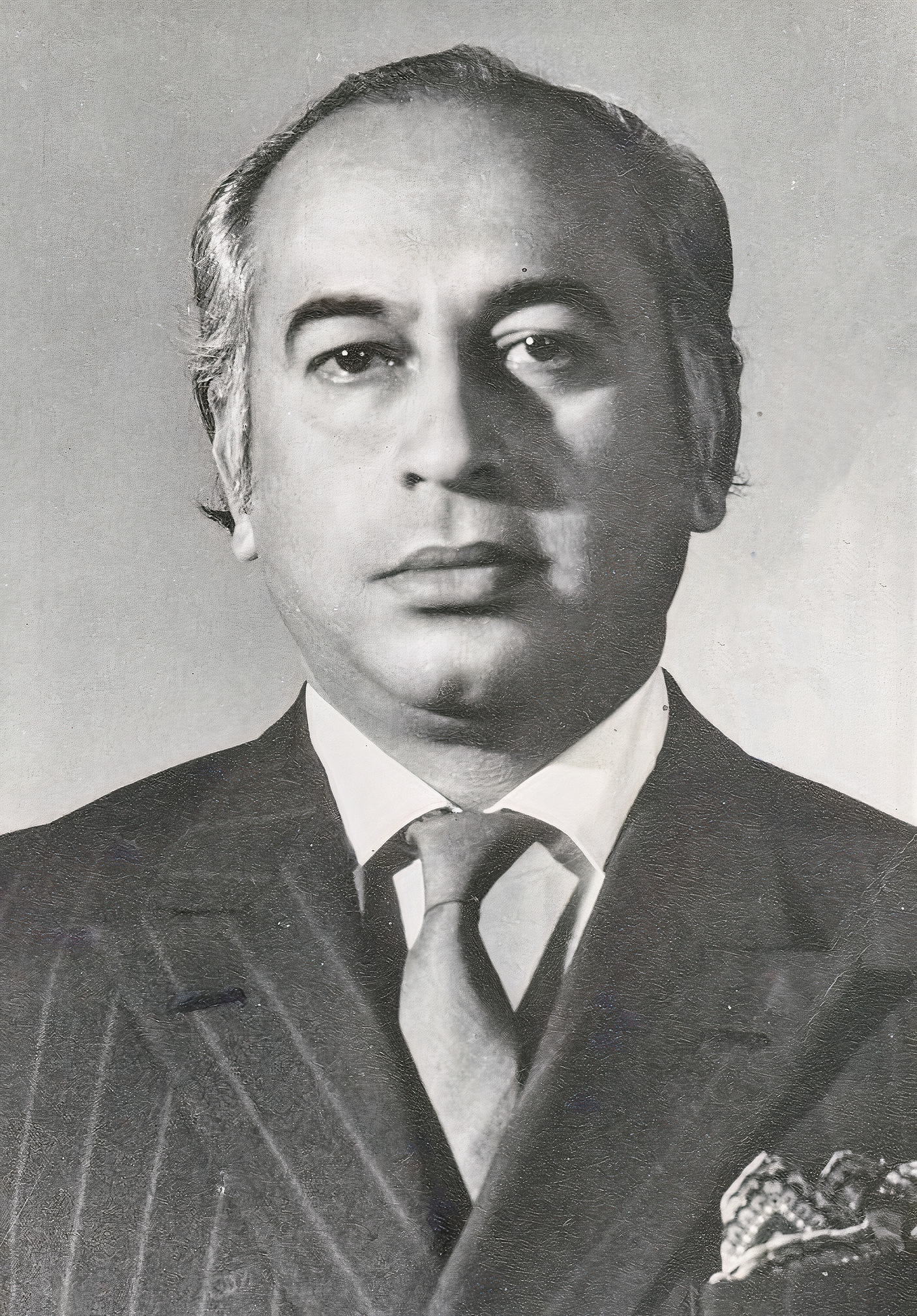
- Official portrait, c. 1971

9th Prime Minister of Pakistan
- In office 14 August 1973 – 5 July 1977
- President: Fazal Ilahi Chaudhry
- Preceded by: Himself (as Chief Martial Law Administrator); Nurul Amin (1971)
- Succeeded by: General Zia-ul-Haq (as Chief Martial Law Administrator); Muhammad Khan Junejo (1985)
- Constituency: Larkana-I

4th President of Pakistan
- In office 20 December 1971 – 14 August 1973
- Vice President: Nurul Amin
- Preceded by: Yahya Khan
- Succeeded by: Fazal Ilahi Chaudhry
- Constituency: Larkana-I

1st Deputy Prime Minister of Pakistan
- In office 7 December 1971 – 20 December 1971
- Prime Minister: Nurul Amin
- Preceded by: Position established
- Succeeded by: Nusrat Bhutto (1989) (as Senior Minister)
- Constituency: Larkana-I

5th Speaker of the National Assembly
- In office 14 April 1972 – 15 August 1972
- Deputy: Muhammad Hanif Khan
- Preceded by: Abdul Jabbar Khan
- Succeeded by: Fazal Ilahi Chaudhry

8th and 12th Minister of Foreign Affairs
- In office 20 December 1971 – 28 March 1977
- Prime Minister: Himself
- Deputy: Sultan Mohammed Khan; Iftikhar Ali; Mumtaz Ali Alvie; Agha Shahi (Foreign Secretary)
- Preceded by: Yahya Khan
- Succeeded by: Aziz Ahmed
- In office 15 June 1963 – 31 August 1966
- President: Ayub Khan
- Deputy: S. K. Dehlavi; Aziz Ahmed; S. M. Yusuf (Foreign Secretary)
- Preceded by: Muhammad Ali Bogra
- Succeeded by: Sharifuddin Pirzada

Chairperson of the Pakistan People's Party
- In office 30 November 1967 – 4 April 1979
- Preceded by: Position established
- Succeeded by: Nusrat Bhutto

Head of the Bhutto family
- In office 6 December 1965 – 4 April 1979
- Preceded by: Nabi Bux Khan Bhutto
- Succeeded by: Mumtaz Bhutto

13th Minister of Defence
- In office 20 December 1971 – 5 July 1977
- Prime Minister: Himself
- Deputy: Ghias Uddin Ahmed; Fazal Muqeem Khan; Ghulam Ishaq Khan (Defence Secretary)
- Preceded by: Yahya Khan
- Succeeded by: Muhammad Zia-ul-Haq

17th and 19th Minister of Interior
- In office 13 January 1977 – 28 March 1977
- Prime Minister: Himself
- Preceded by: Abdul Qayyum Khan
- Succeeded by: Inamul Haque Khan
- In office 24 December 1971 – 1 May 1972
- President: Himself
- Preceded by: Abdur Rashid Khan
- Succeeded by: Abdul Qayyum Khan

12th Minister of Industries
- In office 13 May 1972 – 22 October 1974
- Prime Minister: Himself
- Preceded by: A. K. M. Hafizuddin
- Succeeded by: Rafi Raza

1st Minister of Provincial Coordination
- In office 24 December 1971 – 6 March 1972
- Prime Minister: Himself
- Preceded by: Position established
- Succeeded by: Abdul Hafeez Pirzada

1st Minister of Fuel, Power and Natural Resources
- In office 23 April 1960 – 4 September 1963
- President: Ayub Khan
- Preceded by: Position established
- Succeeded by: Abdullah al Mahmood

16th and 18th Minister of Works
- In office 31 August 1962 – 3 February 1963
- President: Ayub Khan
- Preceded by: Fazlul Qadir Chaudhry
- Succeeded by: Rana Abdul Hamid
- In office 7 September 1961 – 8 June 1962
- President: Ayub Khan
- Preceded by: K. M. Sheikh
- Succeeded by: Fazlul Qadir Chaudhry

14th and 17th Minister of Information and Broadcasting
- In office 25 November 1960 – 10 April 1961
- President: Field Marshal Ayub Khan
- Preceded by: Ayub Khan
- Succeeded by: Habibur Rahman

Personal details
- Born: 5 January 1928 Ratodero, Sind, Bombay Presidency, British India
- Died: 4 April 1979 (aged 51) District Jail, Rawalpindi, Punjab, Pakistan
- Cause of death: Execution by hanging
- Resting place: Bhutto family mausoleum
- Party: Pakistan People's Party
- Other political affiliations: Convention Muslim League (1962–1966)
- Spouse: Shireen Amir (m. 1943, separated) Nusrat Ispahani (m. 1951)
- Children: Benazir; Murtaza; Sanam; Shahnawaz
- Parents: Shah Nawaz Bhutto (father); Khursheed Begum (mother)
- Relatives: Bhutto family
- Education: University of Southern California; University of California, Berkeley; Christ Church, Oxford; Lincoln's Inn
- Profession: Barrister; diplomat; politician
- Awards: Grand Cross with Collar of the Order of Pakistan (Posthumous)
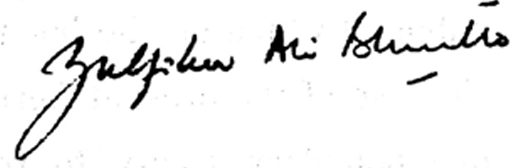
- Signature
- Nickname(s): Quaid-e-Awām ("the People's Leader"); Shahīd-e-Āzam ("The Great Martyr")

Zulfikar Ali Bhutto (Note: Urdu: ذُوالفِقار علی بُھٹّو, Sindhi: ذولفقار علي ڀٽو; /ˈzuːlfiːkɑːr ˈɑːli ˈbutoʊ/) (5 January 1928 – 4 April 1979) was a Pakistani statesman who served as the fourth president of Pakistan from 1971 to 1973, and as the ninth prime minister of Pakistan from 1973 until his overthrow in 1977. He was the founder and first chairman of the Pakistan People's Party (PPP) from 1967 until his execution in 1979.

Born in Sindh and educated at the University of Southern California, University of California, Berkeley and the University of Oxford, Bhutto trained as a barrister at Lincoln's Inn before entering politics. He was a cabinet member during president Iskandar Mirza's tenure, holding various ministries during president Ayub Khan's military rule from 1958 and considered General Burki as a mentor. Bhutto became the foreign minister in 1963, advocating for Operation Gibraltar in Kashmir, leading to the 1965 war with India. Following the Tashkent Declaration, he was dismissed from the government. Bhutto established the Pakistan Peoples' Party (PPP) in 1967, focusing on a left-wing and socialist agenda, and contested the 1970 general election, arising as the largest political party in Western Pakistan (Note: Western Pakistan — comprising Azad Kashmir, Balochistan, Islamabad Capital Territory, North-West Frontier, Northern Areas, Punjab, and Sindh — here refers to the western half of Pakistan from 1947 to 1971; not the province of West Pakistan which was dissolved in July 1970. This specific case in the 1970 election only refers to the four provinces of the Federation of Pakistan in the west — including only Balochistan, North-West Frontier, Punjab, and Sindh.) with a landslide victory in Punjab and Sindh. The Awami League, victorious with a landslide in East Pakistan, and the PPP were unable to agree on power transfer, leading to civil unrest in the east — further intensified by military action under Yahya Khan's military government — followed by a civil war and a war with India, resulting in the creation of Bangladesh. After Pakistan's loss in the east, Yahya resigned amidst a military revolt against him and Bhutto assumed the presidency in December 1971, imposing emergency rule and securing a ceasefire on the western front.

Bhutto secured the release of 93,000 prisoners of war through the Delhi Agreement, a trilateral accord signed between India, Pakistan, and Bangladesh on 28 August 1973, and ratified only by India and Pakistan. He also reclaimed five thousand square miles (13,000 km^{2}) of Indian-held territory through the Simla Agreement, signed between India and Pakistan in July 1972. He strengthened diplomatic ties with other Muslim countries, as well as China; and recognised Bangladesh in 1974 while hosting the historic Islamic Summit in Lahore — attended by leaders from 37 Muslim countries — marking the largest gathering of top Muslim leaders in modern history. (Note: included six monarchs, twelve presidents, six prime ministers, eight foreign ministers, and the chairman of the Palestine Liberation Organization) After declaring a state of emergency in Balochistan in 1973, he dismissed Ataullah Mengal's government and imposed 'governor's rule', appointing Akbar Bugti as governor and ordering a military operation to suppress insurgency in the province. In collaboration with the parliamentary opposition, Bhutto's government drafted and promulgated Pakistan's current constitution in 1973, with the approval of 97 percent of the parliament — bringing an end to emergency rule and restoring parliamentary democracy across the country, with Bhutto assuming office as prime minister. He brought in Abdul Qadeer Khan, strengthened the Pakistan Atomic Energy Commission, and initiated the country's nuclear program which he regarded as a 'national priority'. Bhutto also introduced a policy of extensive nationalisation under his socialist agenda.

Despite winning the 1977 parliamentary elections, the Peoples Party faced allegations of vote rigging by the Pakistan National Alliance (PNA), the populist opposition, sparking violence across the country. Bhutto's government reached an agreement with the opposition to hold fresh elections under a neutral caretaker administration in October of the same year, but Bhutto was deposed two days later in a military coup by army chief Zia-ul-Haq on 5 July 1977. Controversially tried and executed in 1979, his trial — widely described, both in Pakistan and internationally, as a 'judicial murder' — was later declared 'unfair' by the Supreme Court of Pakistan in a mea culpa, following which he was posthumously awarded the Nishan-e-Pakistan, the country's highest civilian award, by the government of Pakistan. (Note: Amnesty International criticized the trial for not meeting fair trial standards. The International Commission of Jurists (ICJ) in Geneva issued a report in 1979 stating that the trial before the Lahore High Court and the appeal in the Supreme Court "did not measure up to the requirements of a fair trial".) (Note: Bhutto's execution prompted widespread international concern and criticism.: Leaders of several Western countries — including U.S. President Jimmy Carter, British Prime Minister James Callaghan, French President Valéry Giscard d'Estaing, and West German Chancellor Helmut Schmidt — had appealed to Zia-ul-Haq for clemency prior to the execution, citing doubts about the fairness of Bhutto's trial.; Major international newspapers and broadcasters, including BBC, questioned the independence of judiciary under military rule.; In the Muslim world, Saudi Arabia reportedly supported exile as an alternative and expressed regret after the execution without open condemnation, while Libya and post-revolutionary Iran openly criticized the hanging.; The prevailing international view among media, human rights organizations, and many political observers regarded Bhutto's death as a political execution carried out under the guise of legality under military rule.)

Bhutto's legacy remains contentious, praised for nationalist and a secular internationalist agenda, yet criticised for economic challenges, political repression and human rights abuses. He is often referred to as the Quaid-e-Awām ("the People's Leader") by his supporters. His daughter Benazir Bhutto served twice as prime minister, and his son-in-law, Asif Ali Zardari, twice as president.

== Early life and education ==
Zulfikar Ali Bhutto belonged to a Sindhi family; Owen Bennett-Jones writes that the family traces its ancestry back to a 9th-century Rajput prince of the Bhati clan who ruled the town of Tanot (in current-day Rajasthan, India), Bhutto's ancestors later appearing in different Rajasthani chronicles in prominent roles, the family converting to Islam mostly around the 17th century before moving to Sindh.

He was born to Shah Nawaz Bhutto and Khursheed Begum near Larkana. His father was the dewan of the princely state of Junagadh and enjoyed an influential relationship with the officials of the British Raj. His mother, Khursheed Begum, was born Lakhi Bai, and had been a professional dance girl from a Hindu family and converted to Islam when she married Shah Nawaz. Reportedly, Shah Nawaz Bhutto had seen her dancing and had proposed, eventually marrying her. Zulfikar was their third child — the first, Sikandar Ali, had died from pneumonia at age seven in 1914, and the second, Imdad Ali, died of cirrhosis at age 39 in 1953.

As a young boy, Bhutto moved to Worli Seaface in Bombay, where he studied at the Cathedral and John Connon School and later at St. Xavier's College, Mumbai. He then also became an activist in the Pakistan Movement. In 1943, his marriage was arranged with Shireen Amir Begum. In 1947, Bhutto was admitted to the University of Southern California to study political science.

In 1949, as a junior, Bhutto transferred to the University of California, Berkeley from the University of Southern California, where he earned a B.A. (honours) degree in political science in 1950. A year later on 8 September 1951, he married a woman of Iranian Kurdish origin—Nusrat Ispahani, popularly known as Begum Nusrat Bhutto. During his studies at the University of California, Berkeley, Bhutto became interested in the theories of socialism, delivering a series of lectures on their feasibility in Islamic countries. During this time, Bhutto's father played a controversial role in the affairs of Junagadh. Coming to power in a palace coup, he secured the accession of his state to Pakistan, which was ultimately negated by Indian intervention in December 1947. In June 1950, Bhutto travelled to the United Kingdom to study law at Christ Church, Oxford and received a BA in jurisprudence, followed by an LLM degree in law and an M.Sc. (honours) degree in political science. Upon finishing his studies, he served as a lecturer in international law at the University of Southampton in 1952, and he was called to the bar at Lincoln's Inn in 1953.

== Political career ==
In 1957, Bhutto became the youngest member of Pakistan's delegation to the United Nations. He addressed the UN Sixth Committee on Aggression that October and led Pakistan's delegation to the first UN Conference on the Law of the Sea in 1958. That year, Bhutto became Pakistan's youngest cabinet minister, taking up the reins of the Ministry of Commerce by President Iskander Mirza, pre-coup d'état government. Bhutto became a trusted ally and advisor of Ayub Khan, rising in influence and power despite his youth and relative inexperience. Bhutto was a junior minister in Ayub Khan administration at the time of signing the Indus Waters Treaty with India in 1960 and was not part of the negotiating team. Bhutto was against this treaty due to yielding too much of water resources to India. Later he vehemently talked publicly against the IWT during his campaign against Ayub Khan regime. Bhutto negotiated an oil-exploration agreement with the Soviet Union in 1961, which agreed to provide economic and technical aid to Pakistan.

The Pakistan Association of Medical Editors in its book, Medical History, wrote: "Gen. Burki maintained very good relations with the late Mr. Zulfiqar Ali Bhutto, who looked at him as a sort of mentor since Mr. Bhutto had joined the 1958 cabinet as a very junior minister and looked to General Burki for support during cabinet meetings."

When President Ayub Khan enacted his 1962 Constitution of Pakistan On the evening of 8 June 1962, Bhutto was almost dropped from the cabinet. Author Syed Shabbir Hussain recalled that it was Wajid Ali Khan Burki who came to Bhutto's rescue when Bhutto "entreatingly" approached Burki at the President's reception that evening who then got him included in the new set-up.

=== Foreign Minister ===
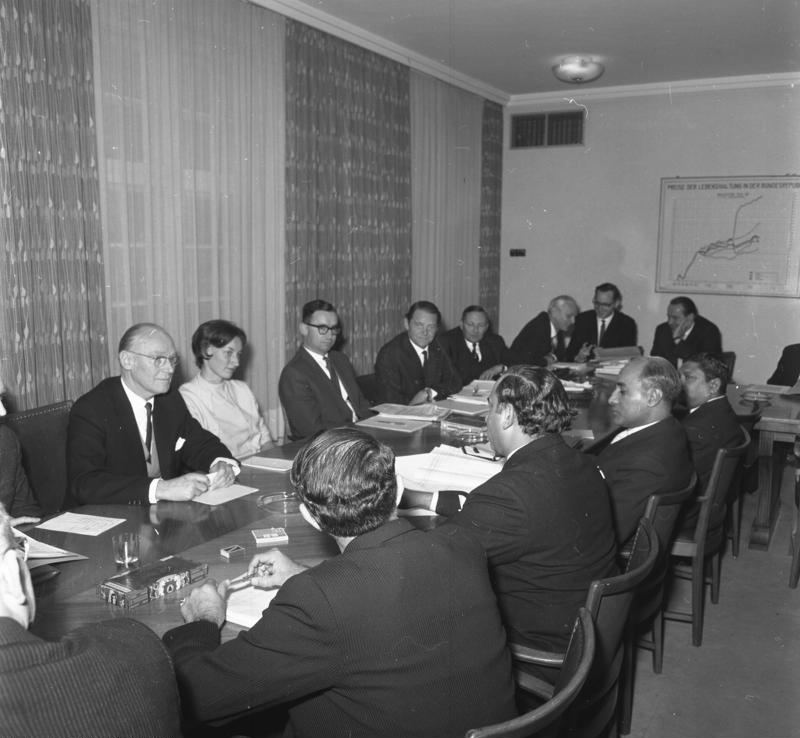
Foreign Minister Bhutto meets West German officials in Bonn, 1965

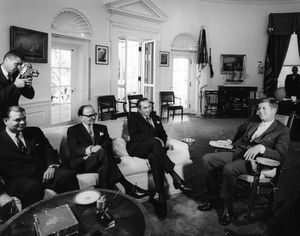
Meeting between Zulfiqar Ali Bhutto and John F. Kennedy

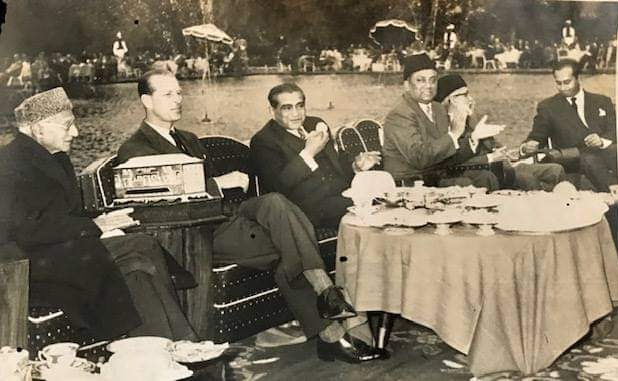
Bhutto with Prince Philip of the United Kingdom at the Shalimar Gardens in Lahore, 1959

Bhutto, a Pakistani nationalist and socialist, held distinctive views on the democracy required in Pakistan. Upon becoming foreign minister in 1963, his socialist stance led to a close relationship with neighboring China, challenging the prevailing acceptance of Taiwan as the legitimate government of China when two governments each claimed to be "China". In 1964, the Soviet Union and its satellite states broke off relations with Beijing over ideological differences, with only Albania and Pakistan supporting the People's Republic of China. Bhutto staunchly supported Beijing in the UN and the UNSC, while also maintaining connections with the United States.

Bhutto's strong advocacy for closer ties with China drew criticism from the United States, with President Lyndon B. Johnson cautioning him about potential repercussions on congressional support for aid to Pakistan. Bhutto, known for his demagogic speeches, led the foreign ministry assertively, rapidly gaining national prominence. During a visit to Beijing, Bhutto and his staff received a warm welcome from the Chinese leadership, including Mao Zedong. Bhutto contributed to negotiating trade and military agreements between Pakistan and China, fostering collaboration on various military and industrial projects.

Bhutto signed the Sino-Pakistan Boundary Agreement on 2 March 1963, transferring 750 square kilometers of territory from Gilgit Baltistan to Chinese control. Bhutto embraced non-alignment, making Pakistan an influential member in non-aligned organisations. Advocating pan-Islamic unity, Bhutto developed closer relations with Indonesia and Saudi Arabia. Bhutto significantly transformed Pakistan's pro-West foreign policy. While maintaining a role in the Southeast Asia Treaty Organization and the Central Treaty Organization, Bhutto asserted an independent foreign policy for Pakistan, free from U.S. influence. Bhutto also visited Poland in 1962, establishing diplomatic relations and fostering mutual cooperation, reaching out to the Polish community in Pakistan. Using Pakistan Air Force's Brigadier-General Władysław Turowicz, Bhutto initiated military and economic links between Pakistan and Poland.

In 1962, as territorial differences escalated between India and China, Beijing considered staging an invasion in northern Indian territories. Premier Zhou Enlai and Mao invited Pakistan to join the raid to reclaim the State of Jammu and Kashmir from India. Bhutto supported the plan, but Ayub opposed it due to fears of Indian retaliation. Instead, Ayub proposed a "joint defense union" with India, shocking Bhutto, who felt Ayub Khan lacked understanding of international affairs. Bhutto, aware of China's restraint from criticising Pakistan despite its membership in anti-communist western alliances, criticised the U.S. for providing military aid to India during and after the 1962 Sino-Indian War, seen as a breach of Pakistan's alliance with the United States.

In 1964, the Combined Opposition Parties (C.O.P.) agreed to unite behind a single candidate and considered nominating retired general Azam Khan to run against President Ayub Khan in the upcoming presidential election, due to Azam Khan's widespread popularity. Shortly after, Maulana Bhashani, a founding member of the Awami League, convinced the opposition to nominate Fatima Jinnah instead. Bhashani also added another condition: that no one associated with Ayub Khan's Martial Law administration, would be acceptable. Several sources indicate that as Ayub's foreign minister, Zulfikar Ali Bhutto, orchestrated the entire strategy to block Azam Khan's candidacy. He did so through Masihur Rahman, a mutual friend of both Bhutto and Bhashani, by providing Masihur Rahman with a bribe of Rs500,000 rupees to pass on to Bhashani, all in an effort to ensure Ayub's victory by having a weaker opponent, Fatima Jinnah, run against him. Days before the election, Bhashani and his group withdrew their support for Fatima. Nevertheless, Azam supported Fatima Jinnah and actively campaigned for her and was noted as having contributed to her success in East Pakistan. Some speculate that Bhashani believed Fatima would be a weaker candidate and suggested her candidacy to ensure Ayub Khan's victory, as he was favoured by the Chinese.

On Bhutto's counsel, Ayub Khan launched Operation Gibraltar in an attempt to "liberate" Kashmir. The operation failed, leading to the Indo-Pakistani War of 1965. This war followed brief skirmishes between March and August 1965 in the Rann of Kutch, Jammu and Kashmir, and Punjab. Bhutto joined Ayub in Uzbekistan to negotiate a peace treaty with Indian prime minister Lal Bahadur Shastri. Ayub and Shastri agreed to exchange prisoners of war and withdraw respective forces to pre-war boundaries. The agreement, deeply unpopular in Pakistan, caused significant political unrest against Ayub's regime. Bhutto's criticism of the final agreement created a major rift with Ayub. Initially denying rumors, Bhutto resigned in June 1966, expressing strong opposition to Ayub's regime.

During his term, Bhutto formulated aggressive geostrategic and foreign policies against India. In 1965, Bhutto received information from his friend Munir Ahmad Khan about the status of India's nuclear program. Bhutto stated, "Pakistan will fight, fight for a thousand years. If India builds the (atom) bomb, Pakistan will eat grass or leaves, even go hungry, but we (Pakistan) will get one of our own (atom bomb).... We (Pakistan) have no other choice!" In his 1969 book The Myth of Independence, Bhutto argued for the necessity of Pakistan acquiring a fission weapon and starting a deterrence program to stand up to industrialised states and a nuclear-armed India. He developed a manifesto outlining the program's development and selected Munir Ahmad Khan to lead it.

== Creation of the Pakistan People's Party ==
After resigning as foreign minister, large crowds gathered to hear Bhutto's speech upon his arrival in Lahore on 21 June 1967. Riding a wave of anger against Ayub, Bhutto traveled across Pakistan, delivering political speeches. In October 1966, Bhutto explicitly outlined the beliefs of his new party: "Islam is our faith, democracy is our policy, socialism is our economy. All power to the people."

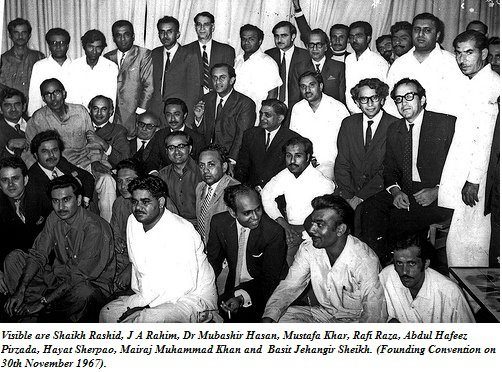
At the Lahore residence of Mubashir Hassan, On 30 November 1967

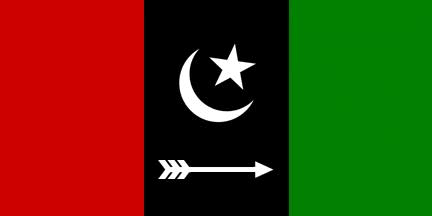
Pakistan People's Party flag, commonly used.

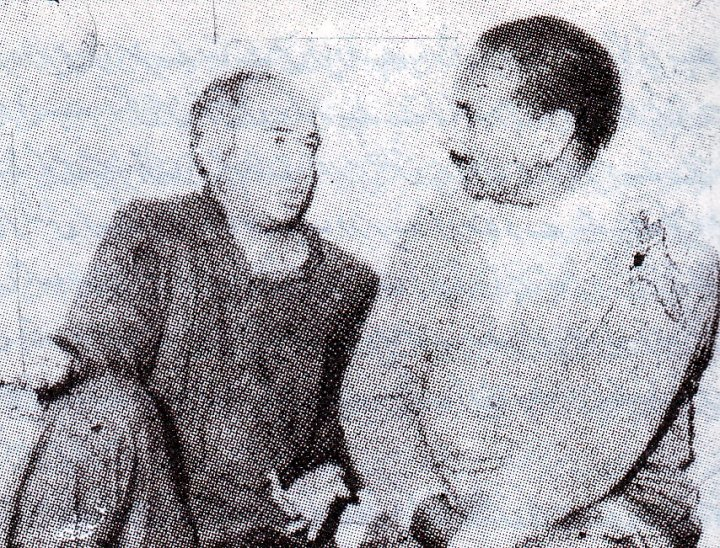
Asghar Khan (right) visits Zulfikar Ali Bhutto who was on house arrest in Larkana, circa 1968-69

On 30 November 1967, at the Lahore residence of Mubashir Hassan, a gathering including Bhutto, political activist Sufi Nazar Muhammad Khan, Bengali communist J. A. Rahim, and Basit Jehangir Sheikh founded the Pakistan Peoples Party (PPP), establishing a strong base in Punjab, Sindh, and among the Muhajirs.

Mubashir Hassan, an engineering professor at UET Lahore, played a pivotal role in the success and rise of Bhutto. Under Hassan's guidance and Bhutto's leadership, the PPP became part of the pro-democracy movement involving diverse political parties from all across Pakistan. PPP activists staged large protests and strikes in different parts of the country, increasing pressure on Ayub to resign.

Asghar Khan recalls Bhutto asking him to join his party, the Pakistan Peoples Party (PPP). Asghar Khan declined, stating he had no interest in politics. After Dr. Hassan and Bhutto's arrest on 12 November 1968, Asghar Khan held a press conference in Lahore on 17 November 1968. Asghar Khan led protests calling for Bhutto's release, which ultimately led to his freedom and grew so close to Bhutto that many saw him as a potential successor. After his release, Bhutto, joined by key leaders of PPP, attended the Round Table Conference called by Ayub Khan in Rawalpindi but refused to accept Ayub's continuation in office and Sheikh Mujibur Rahman's Six point movement for regional autonomy.

=== 1970 elections ===
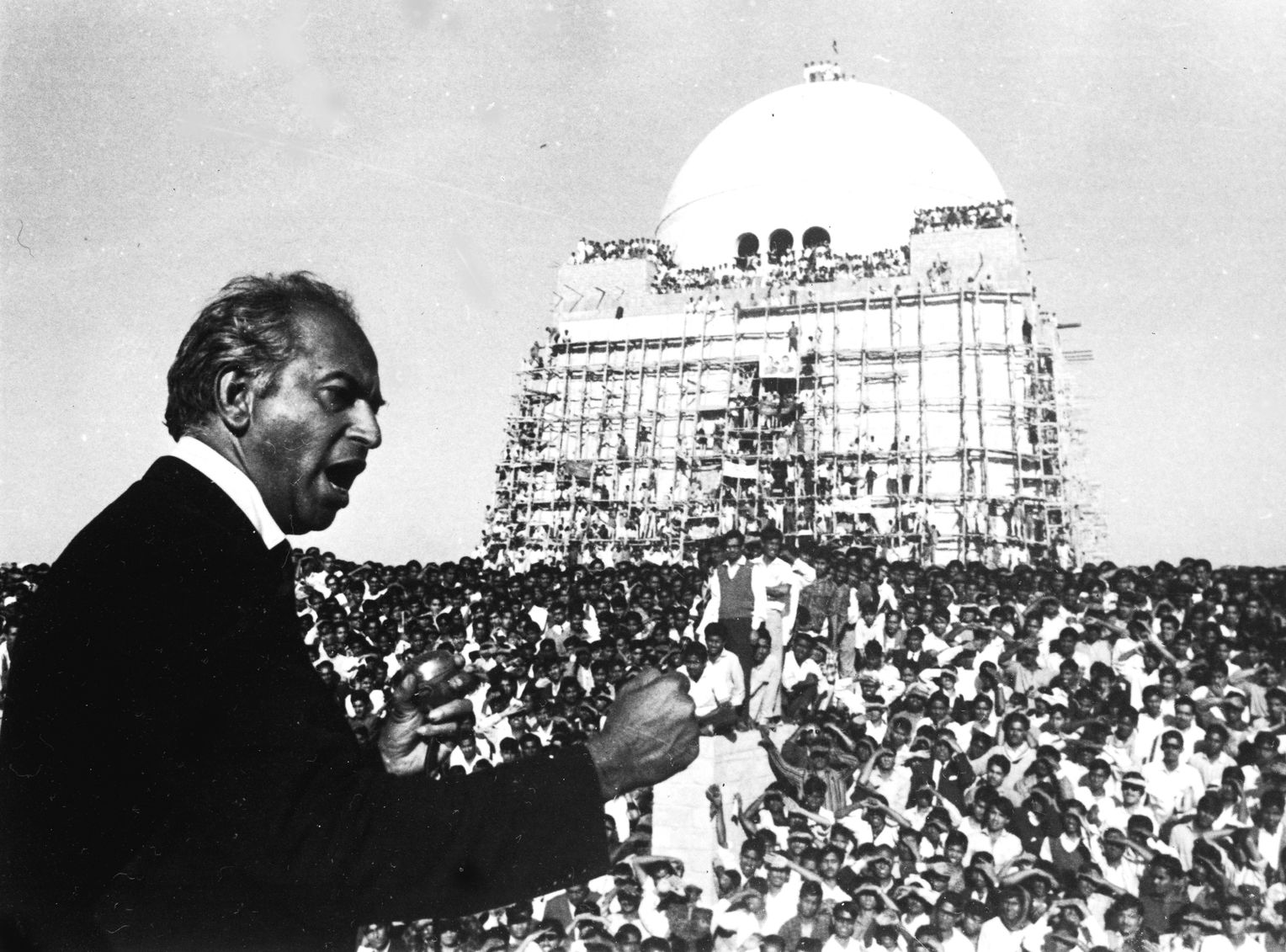
Bhutto in Karachi in 1969.

Following Ayub's resignation, his successor, General Yahya Khan, promised to hold parliamentary elections on 7 December 1970. Under Bhutto's leadership, the democratic socialists, leftists, and Marxist-communists gathered and united into one party platform for the first time in Pakistan's history. The Socialist-Communist bloc, under Bhutto's leadership, intensified its support in Muhajir and poor farming communities in West Pakistan, working through educating people to cast their vote for their better future. Gathering and uniting the scattered socialist-communist groups in one single center was considered Bhutto's greatest political achievement and as a result, Bhutto's party and other leftists won a large number of seats from constituencies in West-Pakistan. However, Sheikh Mujib's Awami League won an absolute majority in the legislature, receiving more than twice as many votes as Bhutto's PPP. Bhutto strongly refused to accept an Awami League government and infamously threatened to "break the legs" of any elected PPP member who dared to attend the inaugural session of the National Assembly. On 17 January 1971, President Yahya visited Bhutto at his baronial family estate, Al-Murtaza, in Larkana, Sindh, accompanied by Lt. General S. G. M. Pirzada, Principal Staff Officer to President Yahya, and General Abdul Hamid Khan, Commander-in-Chief of the Pakistan Army and Deputy Chief Martial Law Administrator.

On 22 February 1971, the generals in West Pakistan took a decision allegedly to crush the Awami League and its supporters. Capitalising on West Pakistani fears of East Pakistani separatism, Bhutto demanded that Sheikh Mujibur Rahman form a coalition with the PPP. And at some stage proposed "idhar hum, udhar tum", meaning he should govern the West and Mujib should Govern the East. President Yahya postponed the meeting of the national assembly which fueled a popular movement in East Pakistan. Amidst popular outrage in East Pakistan, on 7 March 1971, Sheikh Mujib called the Bengalis to join the struggle for "Bangladesh". According to historical references and a report published by the leading Pakistani newspaper The Nation, "Mujib no longer believed in Pakistan and is determined to make Bangladesh". Many also believed that Bhutto wanted power in the West even at the expense of the separation of the East. However, Mujib still kept doors open for some sort of settlement in his speech of 7 March.

=== Fall of East Pakistan ===
Yahya started a negotiating conference in Dhaka, presumably to reach a settlement between Bhutto and Mujib. The discussion was expected to be "fruitful" until the president left for West Pakistan on the evening of 25 March. On that night of 25 March 1971, the army initiated Operation Searchlight, which had been planned by the military junta of Yahya Khan, presumably to suppress political activities and movements by the Bengalis. Mujib was arrested and imprisoned in West Pakistan. Genocide and atrocities by the military against the Bengali population were alleged during the operation.

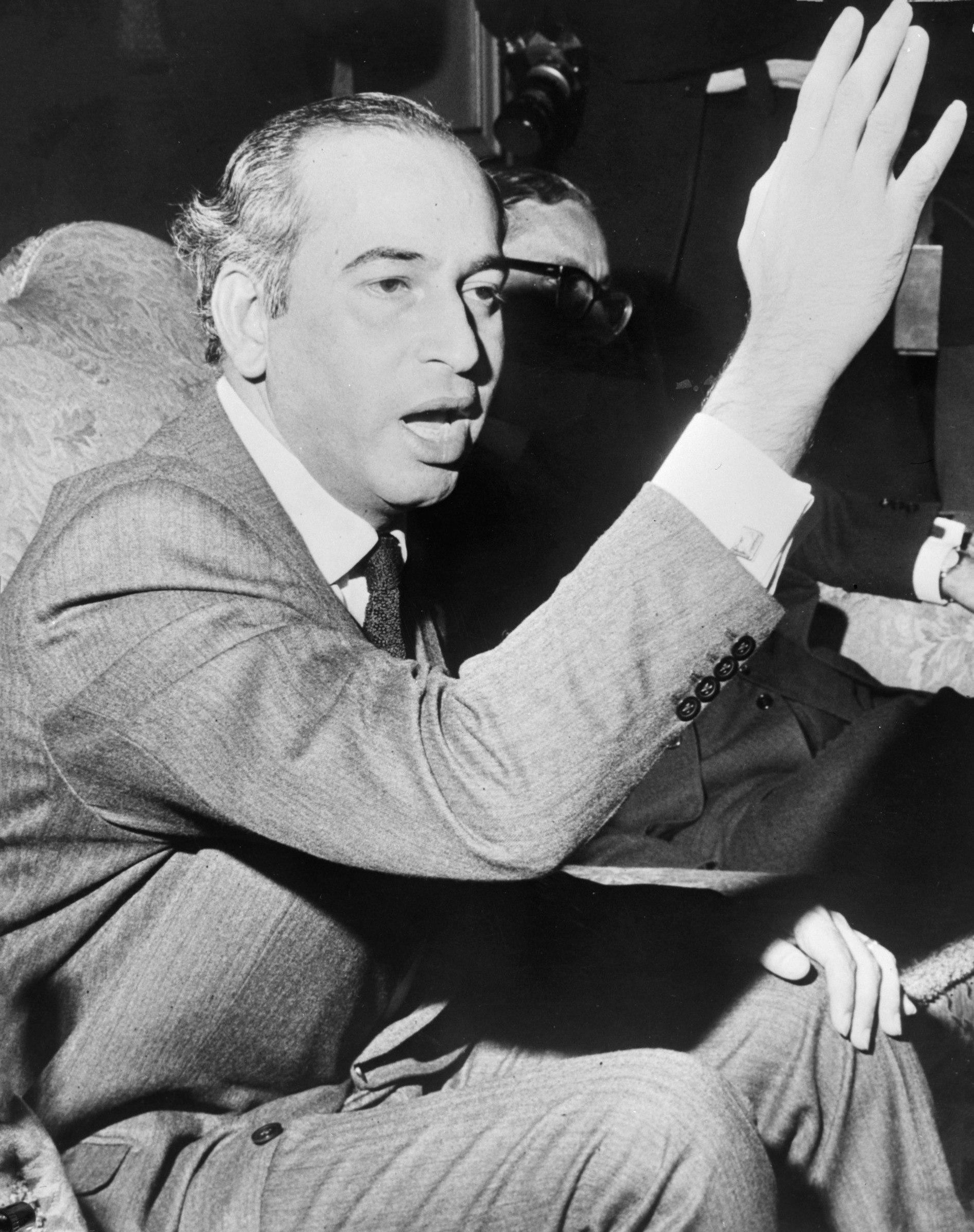
Bhutto in 1971

Bhutto stayed in Dhaka on the night of 25 March and commented that Pakistan had been saved by the army before leaving on the 26th. While supportive of the army's actions and working to rally international support, Bhutto distanced himself from the Yahya Khan regime and began to criticise Yahya Khan for mishandling the situation. He refused to accept Yahya Khan's scheme to appoint Bengali politician Nurul Amin as prime minister, with Bhutto as deputy prime minister. Soon after Bhutto's refusal and continuous resentment toward General Yahya Khan's mishandling of the situation, Khan ordered Military Police to arrest Bhutto on charges of treason, quite similar to Mujib. Bhutto was imprisoned in the Adiala Jail along with Mujib, where he was set to face the charges. The army crackdown on the Bengalis of East Pakistan fueled an armed resistance by the Mukti-Bahini (a guerrilla force formed for the campaign of an independent Bangladesh and trained by the Indian army). Pakistan launched an air attack on India in the western border that resulted in the Indian intervention in East Pakistan, which led to the very bitter defeat of Pakistani forces, who surrendered on 16 December 1971. Consequently, the state of People's Republic of Bangladesh was born, and Bhutto and others condemned Yahya Khan for failing to protect Pakistan's unity. Isolated, Yahya Khan resigned on 20 December and transferred power to Bhutto, who became president, commander-in-chief, and the first civilian chief martial law administrator.

Bhutto was the country's first civilian chief martial law administrator since 1958, as well as the country's first civilian president. With Bhutto assuming control, the leftists and democratic socialists entered the country's politics and later emerged as power players in the country's politics. And, for the first time in the country's history, the leftists and democratic socialists had a chance to administer the country with the popular vote and widely approved exclusive mandate, given to them by the West's population in the 1970s elections.

In a reference written by Kuldip Nayar in his book Scoop! Inside Stories from the Partition to the Present, Nayar noted that "Bhutto's releasing of Mujib did not mean anything to Pakistan's policy as in [sic] if there was [sic] no liberation war." Bhutto's policy, and even as of today, the policy of Pakistan continues to state that "she will continue to fight for the honor and integrity of Pakistan. East Pakistan is an inseparable and unseverable part of Pakistan".

== Leader of Pakistan (1971–1977) ==
=== Presidency (1971-1973) ===
A Pakistan International Airlines flight was sent to fetch Bhutto from New York City, where he was presenting Pakistan's case before the United Nations Security Council on the East Pakistan Crisis. Bhutto returned home on 18 December 1971. On 20 December, he was taken to the President House in Rawalpindi, where he took over two positions from Yahya Khan, one as president and the other as the first civilian Chief Martial Law Administrator. Thus, he was the first civilian Chief Martial Law Administrator of the dismembered Pakistan. By the time Bhutto had assumed control of what remained of Pakistan, the nation was completely isolated, angered, and demoralised. Bhutto addressing the nation through radio and television said:

My dear countrymen, my dear friends, my dear students, labourers, peasants... those who fought for Pakistan... We are facing the worst crisis in our country's life, a deadly crisis. We have to pick up the pieces, very small pieces, but we will make a new Pakistan, a prosperous and progressive Pakistan, a Pakistan free of exploitation, a Pakistan envisaged by the Quaid-e-Azam.

As president, Bhutto faced mounting challenges on both internal and foreign fronts. The trauma was severe in Pakistan, a psychological setback and emotional breakdown for Pakistan. The two-nation theory—the theoretical basis for the creation of Pakistan—lay discredited, and Pakistan's foreign policy collapsed when no moral support was found anywhere, including long-standing allies such as the U.S. and China. However, this is disputed even by Bangladeshi academics who insist that the two-nation theory was not discredited. Since her creation, the physical and moral existence of Pakistan was in great danger. On the internal front, Baloch, Sindhi, Punjabi, and Pashtun nationalisms were at their peak, calling for their independence from Pakistan. Finding it difficult to keep Pakistan united, Bhutto launched full-fledged intelligence and military operations to stamp out any separatist movements. By the end of 1978, these nationalist organisations were brutally quelled by Pakistan Armed Forces.

Bhutto immediately placed Yahya Khan under house arrest, brokered a ceasefire, and ordered the release of Mujib, who was being held prisoner by the Pakistan Army. To implement this, Bhutto overturned the verdict of Mujib's earlier court-martial trial, in which Brigadier Rahimuddin Khan had sentenced him to death. Bhutto aimed to prevent East Pakistan's secession through dialogue and sought to create a loose confederation within the framework of one Pakistan. Stanley Wolpert writes that he sent Mujib to a bungalow in Rawalpindi, where Mujib swore upon the Quran to retire and hand over the nation to him. Bhutto also offered him 50,000, which Mujib declined. Mujib informed Bhutto that he would make this decision once he arrived in Bangladesh. On 8 January, he was flown to London, from where he was taken to Delhi, where Indira Gandhi and her cabinet greeted him. From there, he was taken to Dhaka, as a direct flight to Bangladesh was not possible. There, he delivered a speech at the Ramna Racecourse, completely rejecting Bhutto's offer and severing ties with West Pakistan, saying, "You live in peace and let us live in peace."

Appointing a new cabinet, Bhutto appointed Lieutenant-General Gul Hasan as Commander-in-Chief of the Pakistan Army in 20 December 1971. On 2 January 1972 Bhutto announced the nationalisation of all major industries, including iron and steel, automobiles, heavy engineering, heavy electricals, petrochemicals, cement, and public utilities. Bhutto had named his economic policies Islamic Socialism or as he called "Mussawat-e Muhammadi". 31 industries across 10 sectors were nationalised including 13 banks, 10 shipping companies, 26 Vegetable Oil Companies, Two petroleum companies and 43 insurance companies which were tied together into State Life Insurance Corporation of Pakistan. Ayub Khan's Ghandhara Industries, Sharif owned Ittefaq Foundry, National Bank of Pakistan and Habib Bank Limited were also nationalised. This wave of nationalisation didn't effect textile production light and food industries. In addition to foreign owned companies, Such as the British Attock Petroleum Company and American owned Esso Fertilizers.

In June 1972, Bhutto visited India to meet Prime Minister Indira Gandhi and negotiated a formal peace agreement and the release of 93,000 Pakistani prisoners of war. The two leaders signed the Simla Agreement, which committed both nations to establish a new-yet-temporary Line of Control in Kashmir and obligated them to resolve disputes peacefully through bilateral talks. Bhutto also promised to hold a future summit for the peaceful resolution of the Kashmir dispute and pledged to recognise Bangladesh. Although he secured the release of Pakistani soldiers held by India, Bhutto was criticised by many in Pakistan for allegedly making too many concessions to India. It is theorised that Bhutto feared his downfall if he could not secure the release of Pakistani soldiers and the return of territory occupied by Indian forces. Bhutto established an atomic power development program and inaugurated the first Pakistani atomic reactor, built in collaboration with Canada in Karachi on 28 November. On 30 March, 59 military officers were arrested by army troops for allegedly plotting a coup against Bhutto, who appointed then-Brigadier Muhammad Zia-ul-Haq to head a military tribunal to investigate and try the suspects. The National Assembly approved the new 1973 Constitution, which Bhutto signed into effect on 12 April. The constitution proclaimed an "Islamic Republic" in Pakistan with a parliamentary form of government. On 10 August, Bhutto turned over the post of president to Fazal Ilahi Chaudhry, assuming the office of prime minister instead.

Sharif al Mujahid has argued that, as the appeal of socialist rhetoric declined, Bhutto increasingly turned to Islamic symbolism and policies to mobilize public support. His government liberalized the Hajj policy, sponsored renovations at major Sufi shrines in Pakistan, and made frequent public displays of religious devotion, including visits to shrines and highly publicized pilgrimages abroad. Bhutto also emphasized Pakistan's Islamic identity in foreign policy by strengthening ties with Muslim-majority countries and convening the 1974 Islamic Summit in Lahore following the 1973 Arab-Israeli War, where a commemorative monument was erected. He publicly presented himself as a proponent of Islamic solidarity and Muslim unity, particularly during the later stages of his political career. Bhutto's Pan-Islamic approach would become clear during the 1977 election.

==== Nuclear weapons program ====
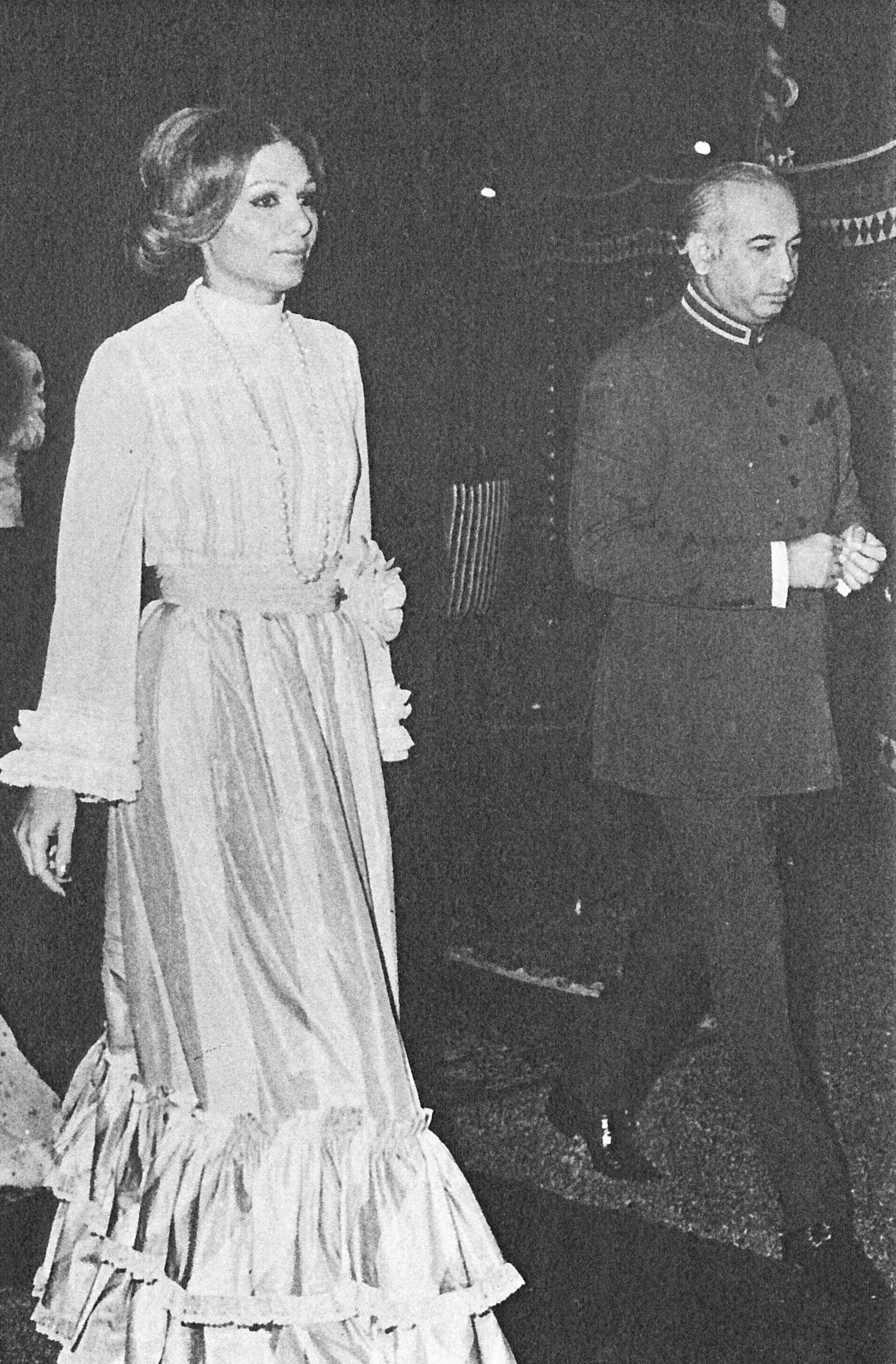
Bhutto meeting with Iranian Empress Farah Pahlavi, 1972

Bhutto, the founder of Pakistan's atomic bomb program, earned the title "Father of Nuclear Deterrence" due to his administration and aggressive leadership of this program. Bhutto's interest in nuclear technology began during his college years in the United States, attending a political science course discussing the political impact of the U.S.'s first nuclear test, Trinity, on global politics.

While at Berkeley, Bhutto witnessed the public panic when the Soviet Union first exploded their bomb, codenamed First Lightning in 1949, prompting the U.S. government to launch their research on 'hydrogen' bombs. However, in 1958, as Minister for Fuel, Power, and National Resources, Bhutto played a key role in setting up the Pakistan Atomic Energy Commission (PAEC) administrative research bodies and institutes. Soon, Bhutto offered a technical post to Munir Ahmad Khan in PAEC in 1958 and lobbied for Abdus Salam to be appointed as Science Adviser in 1960. Before being elevated to Foreign Minister, Bhutto directed funds for key research in nuclear weapons and related science.

In October 1965, as the foreign minister, Bhutto visited Vienna, where nuclear engineer Munir Ahmad Khan held a senior technical post at the IAEA. Munir Khan briefed him on the status of the Indian nuclear programme and the options for Pakistan to develop its own nuclear capability. Both agreed on the necessity for Pakistan to establish a nuclear deterrent against India. Although Munir Khan had failed to convince Ayub Khan, Bhutto assured him, "Don't worry, our turn will come." Shortly after the 1965 war, Bhutto declared at a press conference, "Even if we have to eat grass, we will make a nuclear bomb. We have no other choice," observing India's progress toward developing the bomb. In 1965, Bhutto advocated for Salam, successfully appointing him as the head of Pakistan's delegation at the IAEA, and assisted Salam in lobbying for nuclear power plants. In November 1972, Bhutto advised Salam to travel to the United States to avoid the war and encouraged him to return with key literature on nuclear weapons history. By the end of December 1972, Salam returned to Pakistan with suitcases loaded with literature on the Manhattan Project. In 1974, Bhutto initiated a more aggressive diplomatic offensive on the United States and the Western world over nuclear issues. Writing to world and Western leaders, Bhutto conveyed:

Pakistan was exposed to a kind of "nuclear threat and blackmail" unparalleled elsewhere.... If the world's community failed to provide political insurance to Pakistan and other countries against nuclear blackmail, these countries would be constrained to launch atomic bomb programs of their own!... Assurances provided by the United Nations were not 'Enough!'...

— Zulfikar Ali Bhutto, statement written in Eating Grass, source

Before the 1970s, nuclear deterrence was well-established under the government of Huseyn Shaheed Suhrawardy, but it was entirely peaceful and dedicated to civilian power needs. Bhutto, in his book The Myth of Independence in 1969, wrote:

If Pakistan restricts or suspends her nuclear deterrence, it would not only enable India to blackmail Pakistan with her nuclear advantage but would impose a crippling limitation on the development of Pakistan's science and technology.... Our problem in its essence is how to obtain such a weapon in time before the crisis begins...

— Zulfikar Ali Bhutto

After India's nuclear test—codenamed Smiling Buddha—in May 1974, Bhutto sensed and saw this test as the final anticipation for Pakistan's death. In a press conference held shortly after India's nuclear test, Bhutto said, "India's nuclear program is designed to intimidate Pakistan and establish "hegemony in the subcontinent". Despite Pakistan's limited financial resources, Bhutto was so enthusiastic about the nuclear energy project that he is reported to have said "Pakistanis will eat grass but make a nuclear bomb".

The militarisation of the Pakistan Atomic Energy Commission was initiated on 20 January 1972 and, in its initial years, was implemented by Pakistan Army's Chief of Army Staff General Tikka Khan. The Karachi Nuclear Power Plant (KANUPP-I) was inaugurated by Bhutto during his role as the president of Pakistan at the end of 1972. The nuclear weapons program was set up loosely based on the Manhattan Project of the 1940s under the administrative control of Bhutto.

Senior academic scientists had direct access to Bhutto, who kept him informed about every inch of the development. Bhutto's Science Advisor, Abdus Salam's office was also set up in Bhutto's prime minister secretariat. On Bhutto's request, Salam had established and led the Theoretical Physics Group (TPG) that marked the beginning of the nuclear deterrent program. The TPG designed and developed the nuclear weapons as well as the entire program. Later, Munir Ahmad Khan had him personally approved the budget for the development of the programme.

Wanting a capable administrator, Bhutto sought Lieutenant-General Rahimuddin Khan to chair the commission, which Rahimuddin declined, in 1971. Instead, in January 1972, Bhutto chose a U.S.-trained nuclear engineer, Munir Khan, as chairman of the Pakistan Atomic Energy Commission (PAEC). Bhutto realised he wanted an administrator who understood the scientific and economic needs of this technologically ambitious program. Since 1965, Munir Khan had developed an extremely close and trusted relationship with Bhutto, and even after his death, Benazir and Murtaza Bhutto were instructed by their father to keep in touch with Munir Khan. In the spring of 1976, Kahuta Research Facility, then known as Engineering Research Laboratories (ERL), as part of codename Project-706, was also established by Bhutto and brought under nuclear scientist Abdul Qadeer Khan and the Pakistan Army Corps of Engineers' Lieutenant-General Zahid Ali Akbar.

Because Pakistan, under Bhutto, was not a signatory or party to the Nuclear Non-Proliferation Treaty (NPT), the Nuclear Suppliers Group (NSG), Commissariat à l'énergie atomique (CEA), and British Nuclear Fuels (BNFL) had immediately cancelled fuel reprocessing plant projects with PAEC. According to Causar Nyäzie, the Pakistan Atomic Energy Commission officials had misled Bhutto, and he embarked on a long journey to try to obtain a nuclear fuel reprocessing plant from France. It was on the advice of A. Q. Khan that no fuel existed to reprocess and urged Bhutto to follow his pursuit of uranium enrichment. Bhutto tried to show he was still interested in that expensive route and was relieved when Kissinger persuaded the French to cancel the deal. Bhutto had trusted Munir Ahmad Khan's plans to develop the programme ingeniously, and the mainstream goal of showing such interest in the French reprocessing plant was to give time to PAEC scientists to gain expertise in building its own reprocessing plants. By the time France's CEA cancelled the project, the PAEC had acquired 95% of the detailed plans of the plant and materials.

Munir Ahmad Khan and Ishfaq Ahmad believed that, since PAEC had acquired most of the detailed plans, work, and materials, the PAEC, based on that 95% work, could build the plutonium reprocessing reactors on its own. Pakistan should stick to its original plan, the plutonium route. Bhutto did not disagree but saw an advantage in establishing another parallel programme, the uranium enrichment programme under Abdul Qadeer Khan. Both Munir Khan and Ahmed had shown their concern over Abdul Qadeer Khan's suspected activities, but Bhutto backed Khan when Bhutto maintained that: "No less than any other nation did what Abdul Qadeer Khan (is) doing; the Soviets and Chinese; the British and the French; the Indians and the Israelis; stole the nuclear weapons designs previously in the past and no one questioned them but rather tend to be quiet. We are not stealing what they (illegally) stole in the past (as referring the nuclear weapon designs) but we're taking a small machine which is not useful for making the atomic bomb but for a fuel". International pressure was difficult to counter at that time, and Bhutto, with the help of Munir Ahmad Khan and Aziz Ahmed, tackled the intense heated criticism and diplomatic war with the United States at numerous fronts—while the progress on nuclear weapons remained highly classified.

During this pressure, Aziz Ahmed played a significant role by convincing the consortium industries to sell and export sensitive electronic components before the United States could approach them and try to prevent the consortium industries from exporting such equipment and components. Bhutto slowly reversed and thwarted the United States' any attempt to infiltrate the programme as he had expelled many of the American diplomatic officials in the country, under Operation Sun Rise, authorised by Bhutto under ISI. On the other hand, Bhutto intensified his staunch support and blindly backed Abdul Qadeer Khan to quietly bring the Urenco's weapon-grade technology to Pakistan, keeping the Kahuta Laboratories hidden from the outside world. Regional rivals such as India and the Soviet Union had no basic intelligence on Pakistan's nuclear energy project during the 1970s, and Bhutto's intensified clandestine efforts seemed to pay off in 1978 when the programme was fully matured.

In a thesis presented in The Myth of Independence, Bhutto argued that nuclear weapons would enable India to deploy its Air Force warplanes with small battlefield nuclear devices against the Pakistan Army cantonments, armoured and infantry columns, PAF bases, and nuclear and military industrial facilities. The Indian Air Force would not face adverse reactions from the world community as long as civilian casualties could be minimised. This strategy aimed to lead India to defeat Pakistan, compel its armed forces into a humiliating surrender, and annex the Northern Areas of Pakistan and Azad Kashmir. Subsequently, India would partition Pakistan into smaller states based on ethnic divisions, marking the resolution of the "Pakistan problem" once and for all.

By the time Bhutto was ousted, this crash programme had fully matured in terms of technical development and scientific efforts. By 1977, PAEC and KRL had constructed their uranium enrichment and plutonium reprocessing plants, and the selection for test sites at Chagai Hills was completed by the PAEC. In 1977, the PAEC's Theoretical Physics Group had completed the design of the first fission weapon, and KRL scientists succeeded in electromagnetic isotope separation of Uranium fissile isotopes. Despite this, little progress had been made in the development of weapons, and Pakistan's nuclear arsenal was actually created during General Zia-ul-Haq's military regime, overseen by several Naval admirals, Army and Air Force generals, including Ghulam Ishaq Khan. In 1983, Bhutto's decision was posthumously vindicated when PAEC conducted a cold test near Kirana Hills, evidently made from non-fissioned plutonium. Recent press speculation suggests that Dr. Khan's uranium enrichment designs were exchanged with the Chinese for uranium hexafluoride (UF_{6}) and some highly enriched weapons-grade uranium. Later, this weapons-grade uranium was offered back to the Chinese as the Pakistanis used their own materials.

We (Pakistan)...know that (Israel) and (South Africa) have full nuclear capability — a Christian, Jewish and Hindu civilization have this [nuclear] capability ... the Islamic civilization is without it, but the situation (is) about to change!...

— Zulfikar Ali Bhutto—called for a test from his jail cell, 1978

=== Prime Minister (1973-1977) ===
Bhutto was sworn in as the prime minister of the country on 14 August 1973, after securing 108 votes in a house of 146 members. Fazal Ilahi Chaudhry was elected as the president under the new constitution. During his five years of government, the Bhutto administration implemented extensive reforms at every level of governance. Capital and Western reforms initiated and built in 1947 were transformed and replaced with a socialist system throughout the 1970s. Bhutto's policies were perceived as people-friendly but failed to yield long-lasting effects, and civil disorder against Bhutto began to escalate in 1977.

==== Constitutional reforms ====
Bhutto is considered the main architect of the 1973 constitution as part of his vision to lead Pakistan toward parliamentary democracy. One of the major achievements in Bhutto's life was the drafting of Pakistan's first-ever consensus constitution for the country.

During his time in office, the government carried out seven major amendments to the 1973 Constitution. The First Amendment led to Pakistan's recognition of and diplomatic ties with Bangladesh. The Second Amendment in the constitution declared the Ahmadis as non-Muslims and defined the term non-Muslim. The rights of the detained were limited under the Third Amendment, while the powers and jurisdiction of the courts for providing relief to political opponents were curtailed under the Fourth Amendment. The Fifth Amendment, passed on 15 September 1976, focused on curtailing the power and jurisdiction of the Judiciary. This amendment was highly criticised by lawyers and political leaders. The main provision of the Sixth Amendment extended the term of the Chief Justices of the Supreme Court and the High Courts beyond the age of retirement. This amendment was made in the Constitution to favour the then Chief Justice of the Supreme Court, who was supposed to be a friend of Bhutto.

==== Industrial reforms ====
The Bhutto government implemented a series of reforms in the industrial sector, focusing on nationalisation and improving workers' rights. The initial phase, in 1972, involved the nationalisation of basic industries such as steel, chemical, and cement. A significant move occurred on 1 January 1974, when Bhutto nationalised all banks. The final step in this sequence was the nationalisation of all flour, rice, and cotton mills across the country. However, this nationalisation process didn't meet Bhutto's expectations and faced challenges. Many nationalised units were small businesses that didn't qualify as industrial units, leading to adverse consequences for numerous small businessmen and traders who were either ruined, displaced, or left unemployed. In hindsight, nationalisation resulted in significant losses to both the national treasury and the people of Pakistan.

The Bhutto government established an extensive network of both rural and urban schools, including approximately 6,500 elementary schools, 900 middle schools, 407 high schools, 51 intermediate colleges, and 21 junior colleges. Departing from the Western education system, Bhutto returned most literature to the Western world and encouraged local academicians to publish books in their respective fields. Although these local books were made more affordable to the public, these reforms stirred controversy. Bhutto's government mandated the inclusion of Islamic and Pakistan studies in school curricula. Book banks were introduced in most institutions, and over 400,000 copies of textbooks were supplied to students.

Bhutto is credited with establishing the world-class Quaid-e-Azam University and Allama Iqbal Open University in Islamabad in 1974, along with founding Gomal University in Dera Ismail Khan in 1973. During his tenure as foreign minister, he collaborated with Abdus Salam in 1967 to set up the Institute of Theoretical Physics. As prime minister, Bhutto made groundbreaking efforts to enhance the education system, founding the Allama Iqbal Medical College in 1975.

In 1974, with Abdus Salam's assistance, Bhutto authorised the International Nathiagali Summer College on Contemporary Physics (INSC) at Nathiagali. To this day, the INSC conference continues to be held in Pakistan, attracting thousands of scientists worldwide to interact with Pakistan's academic community. In 1976, Bhutto established the Engineering Council, Institute of Theoretical Physics, Pakistan Academy of Letters, and Cadet College Razmak in North Waziristan. Additionally, he inaugurated four new universities in Multan, Bahawalpur, and Khairpur. The People's Open University, another innovative venture, commenced operations in Islamabad. The government's Education Policy included fee remission and the provision of numerous scholarships for higher education to the children of low-paid employees. After the 1977 election, plans were in place to add seven thousand new hostel seats to the existing accommodation. In 1975, Bhutto acknowledged the challenges and shortcomings faced by college students in many existing hostels. Consequently, he directed the provision of fans, water coolers, and pay telephones in each hostel as quickly as physically possible.

==== Land, flood, and agriculture reforms ====
During his tenure as prime minister, several land reforms were introduced. The significant land reforms included the reduction of land ceilings and the introduction of tenancy security for tenant farmers. The land ceiling was fixed at 150 acres (0.61 km^{2}) of irrigated land and 300 acres (1.2 km^{2}) of non-irrigated land. Another step that Bhutto took was to democratise Pakistan's Civil Service. In Balochistan, the pernicious practice of Shishak and Sardari System was abolished. In 1976, the Bhutto government established the Federal Flood Commission (FFC), tasked with preparing national flood protection plans, flood forecasting, and research to harness floodwater. Bhutto later went on to upgrade a number of dams and barrages built in Sindh Province.

Bhutto strongly advocated empowering small farmers, asserting that a weak and demoralised farming community would jeopardise Pakistan's agricultural strength. He believed that farmers needed to feel psychologically secure for the country to achieve self-sufficiency in food. Consequently, the Bhutto government launched programmes to lead the country towards self-sufficiency in rice hulling, sugar milling, and wheat husking industries. Bhutto's government increased control over rice hulling, sugar mills, and wheat husking factories, initially believing that public sector involvement would diminish the influence of multinational corporations and prevent monopolies. The government sponsored schemes to address waterlogging and salinity issues. Tax exceptions were introduced for small landowners to promote agricultural growth. While his nationalisation of Sindh-based industries benefited the poor, it caused discontent among influential feudal lords.

==== Economic policy ====
Bhutto implemented socialist economics while working to prevent any further division of the country. Major heavy mechanical, chemical, and electrical engineering industries were immediately nationalised by Bhutto, and all of the industries came under direct control of government. Industries, such as Karachi Electric Supply Corporation (KSEC), were under complete government control with no private influence in KESC decision. Bhutto abandoned Ayub Khan's state capitalism policies and introduced socialist policies in a move to reduce income inequality. Bhutto also established the Port Qasim, Pakistan Steel Mills, the Heavy Mechanical Complex (HMC), and several cement factories. However, the growth rate of the economy relative to that of the 1960s when East Pakistan was still part of Pakistan and large generous aid from the United States declined after the global oil crises in 1973, which also had a negative impact on the economy. Despite the initiatives undertaken by Bhutto's government to boost the country's economy, the economical growth remained at an equilibrium level. But Bhutto's policy largely benefited the poor and working class when the level of absolute poverty was sharply reduced, with the percentage of the population estimated to be living in absolute poverty falling from 46.5% by the end of 1979–80, under General Zia-ul-Haq's military rule, to 30.8%. The land reform programme provided increased economic support to landless tenants, and development spending was substantially increased, particularly on health and education, in both rural and urban areas, and provided "material support" to rural wage workers, landless peasants, and urban wage workers.

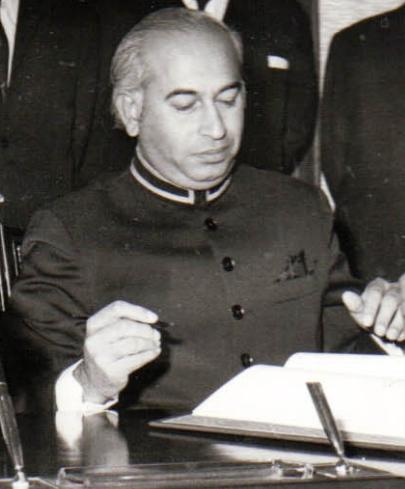
Prime Minister Zulfikar Ali Bhutto

Bhutto's nationalisation policies aimed to empower workers, giving them control over the means of production and protecting small businesses. However, economic historians argued that the nationalisation program initially affected small industries and had devastating effects on Pakistan's economy, diminishing Bhutto's credibility. Conservative critics believed the nationalisation policies damaged investor confidence, and government corruption in nationalised industries grew, although no serious corruption cases were ever proven against Bhutto by the military junta. In 1974, Bhutto maintained that foreign companies and industries in Pakistan were exempt from nationalisation policies, and his government would welcome foreign investment to establish factories. Commenting on his policies in 1973, Bhutto told a group of investors from the Lahore Chamber of Commerce and Industry (LCCI) that "activity of the public sector or state sector prevents the concentration of economic power in a few hands and protects small and medium entrepreneurs from the clutches of giant enterprises and vested interests."

Bhutto's departure from certain socialist policies greatly displeased his democratic socialist alliance and many in the Pakistan Peoples Party. Notably, Malik Meraj Khalid and other colleagues, resigned from Bhutto and left for the Soviet Union. Ongoing disagreements eventually led to the collapse of the government's socialist alliance, which later united with the secular Independence Movement led by Asghar Khan.

As part of his investment policies, Bhutto established the National Development Finance Corporation (NDFC) in July 1973, with an initial government investment of 100 million PRs. Initially aimed at financing public sector industrial enterprises, its charter was later modified to provide finance to the private sector as well. The NDFC is currently the largest development finance institution in Pakistan, engaging in diversified activities in industrial financing and investment banking. Forty-two projects financed by NDFC have contributed Rs. 10,761 million to Pakistan's GDP, generating Rs. 690 million in after-tax profits and creating 40,465 jobs. By the mid-1990s, NDFC had a pool of resources amounting to US$878 million. The Bhutto government increased the level of investment, both private and public, in the economy from less than Rs. 7,000 million in 1971–72 to more than Rs. 17,000 million in 1974–75.

===== Banking and Export expansion =====
Banking reforms were introduced to provide more opportunities to small farmers and businesses, such as mandating that 70% of institutional lending should be for small landholders of 12.5 acres or less—a revolutionary idea at a time when banks primarily served privileged classes. The number of bank branches increased by 75% from December 1971 to November 1976, rising from 3,295 to 5,727. This move by Bhutto was one of the most radical, expanding bank infrastructure to cover all towns and villages with a population of 5,000, following the nationalisation of banks.

By the end of Bhutto's government, the concentration of wealth had declined compared to the height of the Ayub Khan era when 22 families owned 66% of industrial capital and controlled banking and 97% of insurance.

Measures taken in the first few months of 1972 set a new framework for the revival of the economy. The diversion of trade from East Pakistan to international markets was completed within a short period. By 1974, exports exceeded one billion dollars, showing a 60% increase over the combined exports of East and West Pakistan before separation. This growth was achieved and benefited from during the major 1973 oil crisis and in the middle of a global recession. The national income of Pakistan increased by 15%, and industrial production rose by as much as 20% in four years.

==== Balochistan ====
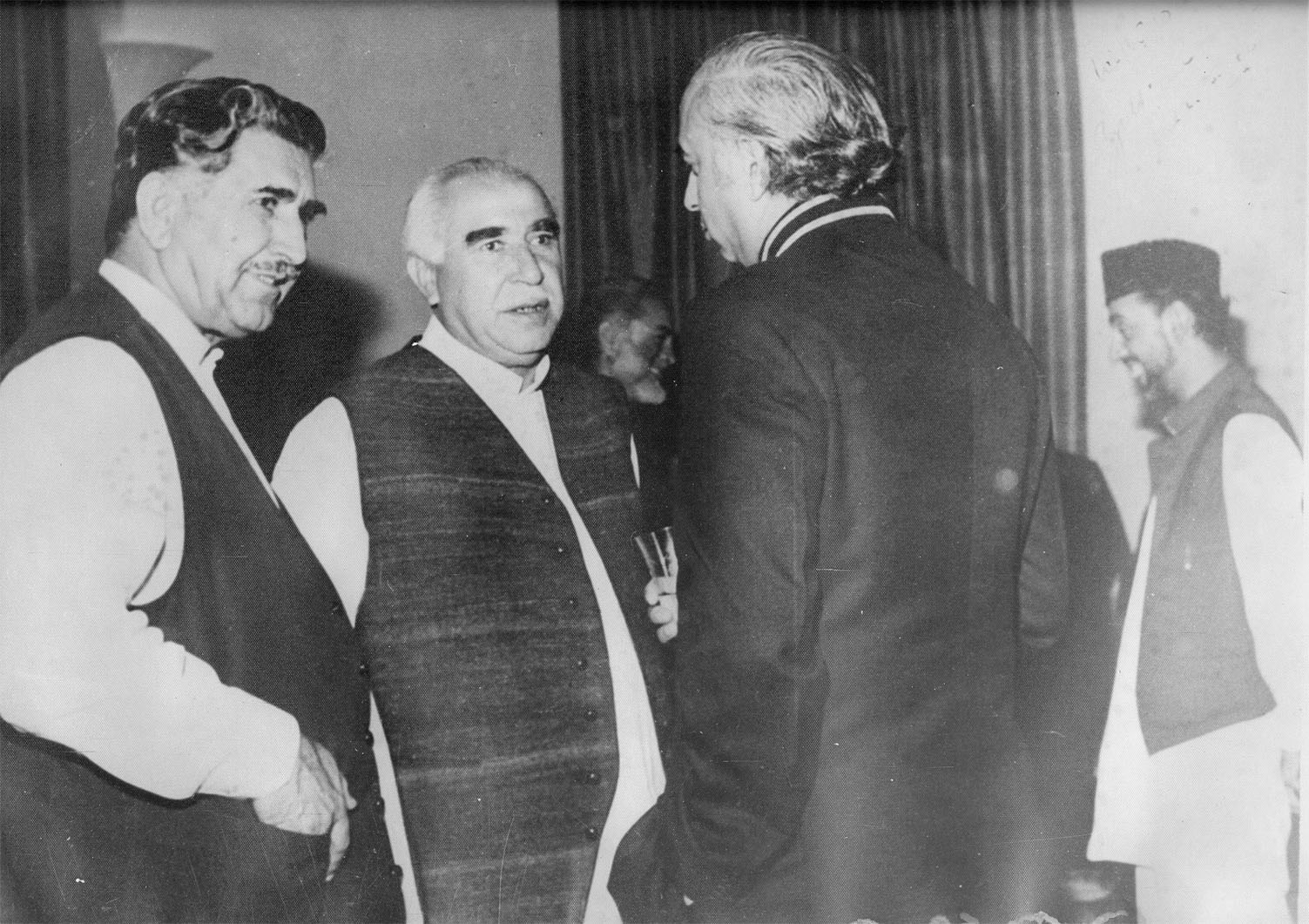
Bhutto with Baloch leaders and government officials at the Governor's House in Quetta

Following the secession of East Pakistan, calls for the independence of Balochistan by Baloch nationalists grew immensely. Surveying the political instability, Bhutto's central government sacked two provincial governments within six months, arrested the two chief ministers, two governors, and forty-four MNAs and MPAs, obtained an order from the Supreme Court banning the National People's Party on the recommendation of Akbar Bugti, and charged everyone with high treason to be tried by a specially constituted Hyderabad tribunal of hand-picked judges.

In January 1973, Bhutto ordered the Pakistan Armed Forces to suppress a rising insurgency in the province of Balochistan. He dismissed the governments in Balochistan and the North-West Frontier Province once more. Following the alleged discovery of Iraqi arms in Islamabad in February 1973, Bhutto dissolved the Provincial Assembly of Balochistan. The operation, under General Tikka Khan, soon took shape in a five-year conflict with the Baloch separatists. The sporadic fighting between the insurgency and the army started in 1973, with the largest confrontation taking place in September 1974. Later on, Pakistan Navy, under Vice-Admiral Patrick Julius Simpson, also jumped into the conflict as it had applied naval blockades to Balochistan's port. The Navy began its separate operations to seize the shipments sent to aid Baloch separatists. Pakistan Air Force also launched air operations, and with the support of navy and army, the air force had pounded the mountainous hidden havens of the Separatists. The Iranian military, also fearing a spread of the greater Baloch resistance in Iran, aided the Pakistani military as well. Among Iran's contributions were 30 Huey cobra attack helicopters and $200 million in aid.

===== Iraqi intervention =====
Iraq under Sunni President Saddam Hussein sent Iraqi-made weapons to Pakistan's warm water ports. Pakistan's navy mounted an effective blockade. Saddam's government provided support for Baloch separatists in Pakistan, hoping their conflict would spread to rival Iran. In 1973, Iraq provided the Balochs with conventional arms, and it opened an office for the Baluchistan Liberation Front (BLF) in Baghdad. This operation was supposed to be covert, but in 1973, the operation was exposed by M.I. when senior separatist leader Akbar Bugti defected to Bhutto, revealing a series of arms stored in the Iraqi Embassy.

On the midnight of 9 February 1973, Bhutto launched an operation to seize control of the Iraqi Embassy, and preparation for the siege was hastily prepared. The operation was highly risky, and a wrong step could have started a war between the two countries. The operation was carefully analysed and at 00:00 hrs (12:00 am), the SSG Division accompanied by Army Rangers stormed the Embassy. Military Police arrested the Iraqi Ambassador, the military attaché, and Iraq's diplomatic staff. Following the incident, authorities discovered 300 Soviet sub-machine guns with 50,000 rounds of ammunition and a large amount of money that was to be distributed amongst Baloch separatist groups. Bhutto was angered and frustrated. Without demanding an explanation, he ordered the Military Police to immediately expel the Iraqi Ambassador and his staff as persona non grata on the first available flight. The government announced the Iraqi plan to further dismember the country, and Bhutto's successful diplomatic offensive against Iraq isolated Saddam internationally with global condemnation. This incident caused Pakistan to support Iran during the Iran–Iraq War in the 1980s.

==== Passport reforms ====
The Bhutto government granted the right of a passport to every citizen of Pakistan, facilitating millions of skilled and non-skilled Pakistanis to seek employment in Gulf countries through a series of bilateral agreements. From Khyber Pakhtunkhwa, alone, 35,000 workers were given the opportunity to work in the United Arab Emirates and Saudi Arabia. Bhutto utilised the Pakistani community of London to lobby and influence European governments to improve the rights of expatriate Pakistani communities in Europe. The remittances from overseas Pakistanis, now totaling around $US25 billion per annum, constitute a dependable source of foreign exchange for Pakistan.

==== Labour policy and social security ====
Bhutto's government implemented comprehensive labour reforms, introducing conditions on worker dismissals and establishing Labour Courts for swift grievance redressal. A scheme for workers' participation in management was introduced, ensuring 20% participation at the factory level. The government abolished workers' contribution to the Social Security Fund, shifting the burden to employers. Compensation rates under the Worker's Compensation Act were increased.

In 1972, the government initially provided old age benefits through group insurance, enhanced compensation rates, and gratuity. To address immediate needs, a pension scheme was introduced, offering Rs. 75 per month after retirement at 55 for men and 50 for women with 15 years of insurable employment. This applied to establishments employing ten or more workers with monthly wages up to Rs. 1,000, including benefits for skilled workers invalid after five years of insurable employment. Contrary to the Western model, Bhutto's government aimed to relieve workers of the financial burden, funding the scheme through a 5% contribution from employers based on the wage bill.

==== Foreign policy ====
After assuming power, Bhutto aimed to diversify Pakistan's relations, leading to its exit from CENTO and SEATO. He strengthened Arab relations and developed Sino-Pakistani relations. Bhutto believed in an independent Foreign Policy, distinct from Western influence, particularly the United States' sphere of influence. With Bhutto as foreign minister and prime minister, Pakistan and Iran formed a special relationship, as Iran provided military assistance.

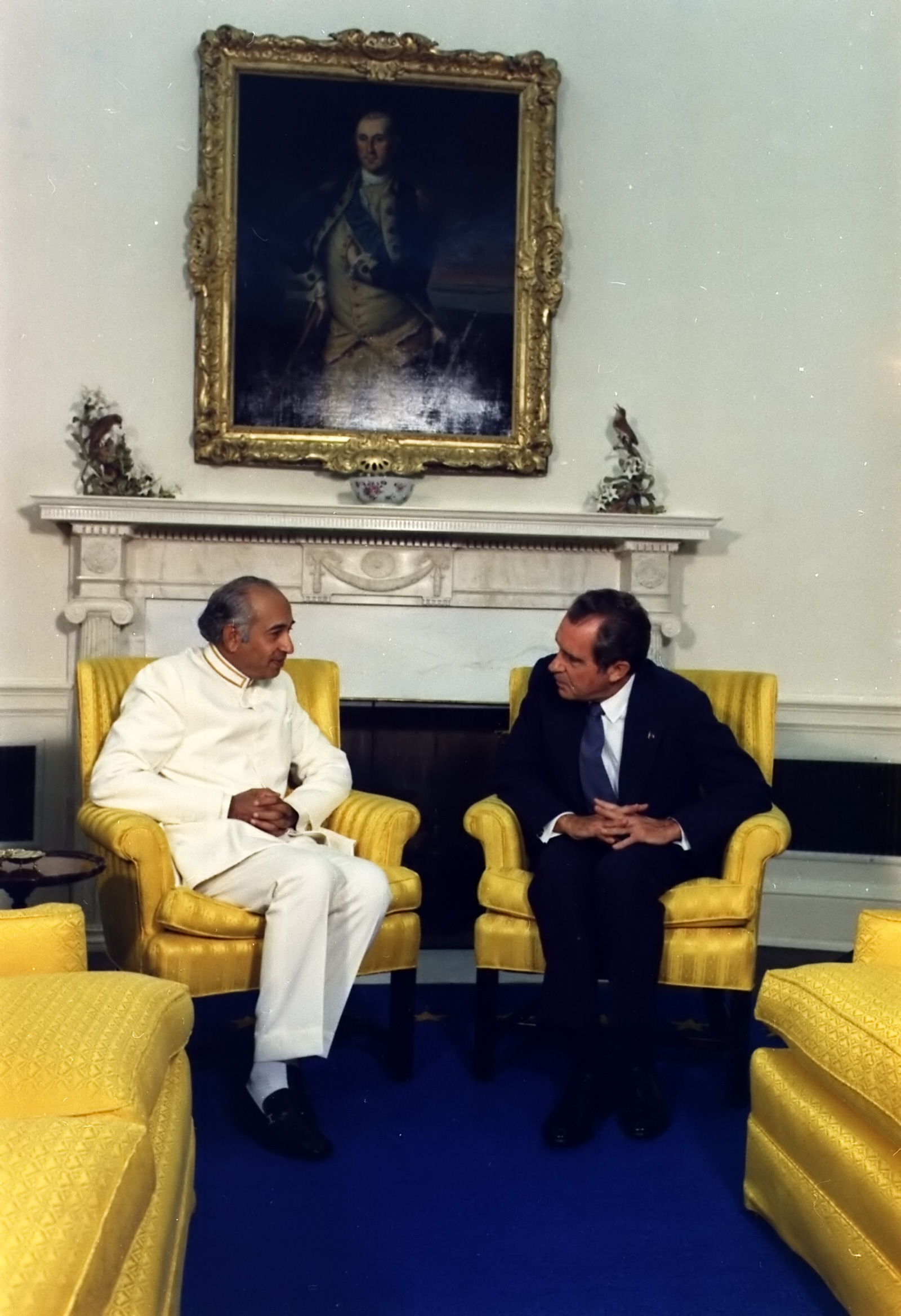
Bhutto with U.S. president Richard Nixon, 1973

Sino-Pakistani relations were immensely improved, and Pakistan, under Bhutto, had built a strategic relationship with the People's Republic of China, when PRC was isolated. In 1974, Bhutto hosted the second Organisation of the Islamic Conference (OIC) in 1974 where he delegated and invited leaders from the Muslim world to Lahore, Punjab Province of Pakistan. Bhutto was a strong advocate of Afro-Asian Solidarity and had cemented ties with Afro-Asian and Islamic countries and by 1976 had emerged as the Leader of the Third World.

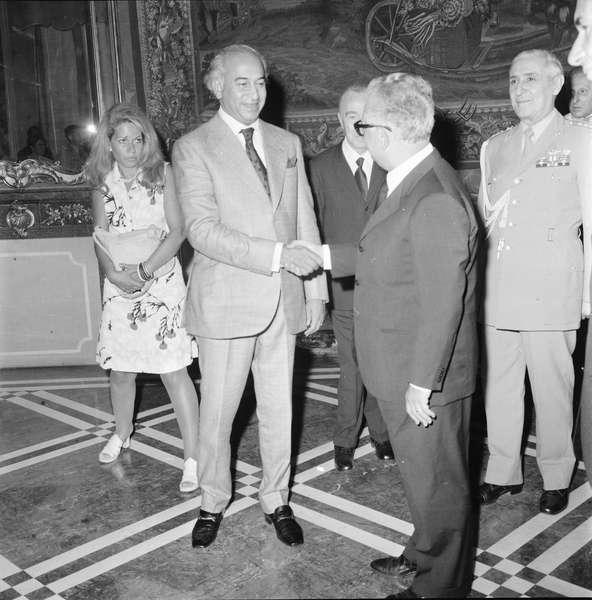
Bhutto with Italian president Giovanni Leone, 1973

Bhutto pursued a peace agreement, the Simla Agreement, with Indira Gandhi, the premier of India. He successfully brought back 93,000 P.O.Ws to Pakistan and secured 5,000 sq mi (13,000 km^{2}) held by India without compromising on the Kashmir stance or recognising Bangladesh, which were key Indian demands. Negotiating with a power that had dismembered the country was a significant challenge for Bhutto, but he smoothly convinced India to return the territory and the POWs to Pakistan. Before the conference, Bhutto and his colleagues thoroughly prepared, considering that the Arabs had not succeeded in regaining territory lost in the 1967 war with Israel. Bhutto understood that capturing land does not attract the same international attention as the plight of prisoners. According to Benazir Bhutto, Bhutto demanded control of the territory in the first stage of the Agreement, surprising and shocking the Indian delegation. From Bhutto's perspective, the POW problem was more of a humanitarian problem that could be addressed at any time, but the territorial problem could become integrated into India over time. Indian premier Gandhi was stunned and astonished at Bhutto's demand but eventually agreed to give the territory back to Bhutto in the first stage of the agreement after Bhutto negotiated with economic packages. Bhutto's knowledge and intellectualism impressed Gandhi personally, making this agreement, with Pakistan paying a small price, one of Bhutto's most significant diplomatic successes.

Bhutto's extensive knowledge, intelligence, and keen awareness of post-World War II and the nuclear history enabled him to shape foreign policy, resulting in unparalleled unity in Pakistan's foreign policy history. Elements of his policy were continued by successive governments, playing a vital role in world politics. In 1974, Bhutto and his Foreign Minister Aziz Ahmed brought a U.N. resolution, recommending the establishment of a nuclear-weapon-free zone in South Asia. They aggressively criticised the Indian nuclear program. While Abdul Qadeer Khan was tasked with acquiring gas-centrifuge technology through atomic proliferation, the resolution's goal was achieved when Bhutto put India on the defensive and promoted Pakistan as a non-proliferationist.

===== East Asia =====
Since the 1960s, Bhutto had been anti-SEATO and preferred a non-aligned policy. Soon after assuming office, Bhutto took a lengthy foreign trip to Southeast Asia, seeking closer relations with Vietnam, Thailand, Laos, Burma, and North Korea. His policy largely followed tight relations with China, normalised relationships with the Soviet Union, built an Islamic bloc, and advocated the creation of a new economic alliance benefiting third and second world countries.

All of these initiatives and implications had disastrous effects on Japan, prompting Japan to oppose Bhutto, although Bhutto was a great admirer of Japan, even though Japan was not a constituent part of Bhutto's foreign policy. In the 1970s, Japan made several attempts to get close to Bhutto, sending its military officials, scientists, and parliamentary delegations to Pakistan. Hence Japan went far by condemning India for carrying out a nuclear test, Smiling Buddha, in 1974, and publicly supported Pakistan's non-nuclear weapon policy and pledged to build several new nuclear power plants. In 1970, Bhutto advised Japan not to be a party to NPT, but Japan signed it but later regretted not being properly progressed.

In Bhutto's view, Japan had been under the United States' influence, and a much bigger role of Japan in Asia would only benefit American interests in the region. By the 1970s, Japan completely lost its momentum in Pakistan as Pakistan followed a strict independent policy. Bhutto envisioned Pakistan's new policy as benefiting economic relations rather than the military alliance, which also affected Japan's impact on Pakistan. However, much of the foreign policy efforts were reverted by General Zia-ul-Haq, and ties were finally restored after Bhutto's execution.

===== Arab world and Israel =====
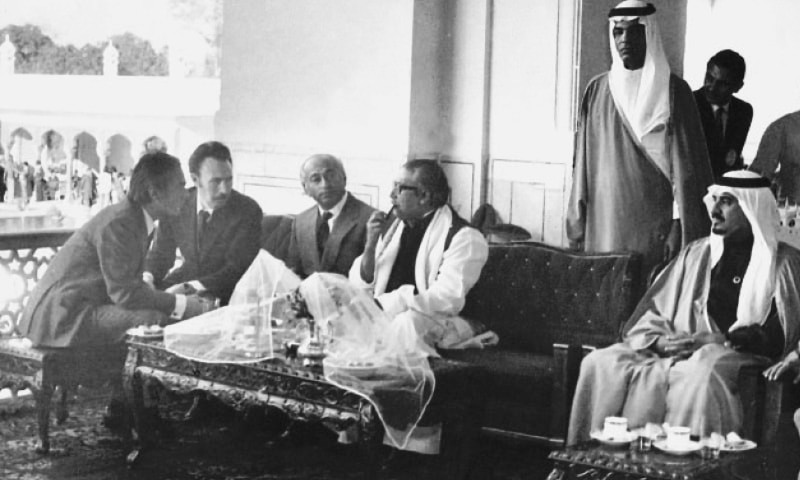
Bhutto with other Muslim leaders at the Organisation of Islamic Cooperation summit in Lahore, February 1974

Bhutto sought to improve Pakistan's ties with the Arab world and sided with the Arab world during the Arab-Israeli conflict. Colonel Gaddafi of former Socialist Libya considered Bhutto one of his greatest inspirations and was said to be very fond of Bhutto's intellectualism. In 1973, during the Yom Kippur War, Pakistan's relations with the Arab world represented a watershed.

In 1974, pressured by other Muslim nations, Pakistan eventually recognised Bangladesh as Mujib stated he would only go to the OIC conference in Lahore if Pakistan recognised Bangladesh. Pakistan established full diplomatic relations with Bangladesh on 18 January 1976, and relations improved in the following decades. Bhutto aided the Syrian and Egyptian Air Force by sending the Pakistan Air Force and Navy's top fighter pilots, where they flew combat missions against Israel. However, Iraq did not benefit from Bhutto's policies.

===== United States and Soviet Union =====
In 1974, India carried out a nuclear test, codenamed Smiling Buddha, near Pakistan's eastern border. Bhutto unsuccessfully lobbied for the United States to impose economic sanctions on India. However, at the request of Bhutto, Pakistan's ambassador to the United States convened a meeting with Secretary of State Henry Kissinger. Kissinger told Pakistan's ambassador to Washington that the test is "a fait accompli and that Pakistan would have to learn to live with it", although he was aware this was "a little rough" on the Pakistanis. In 1976, ties were further strained as Bhutto had continued to administer the research on weapons, and in 1976, in a meeting with Bhutto and Kissinger, Kissinger had told Bhutto, "that if you [Bhutto] do not cancel, modify, or postpone the Reprocessing Plant Agreement, we will make a horrible example of you". The meeting was ended by Bhutto as he had replied: For my country's sake, for the sake of the people of Pakistan, I did not succumb to that blackmailing and threats.

After this meeting, Bhutto intensified Pakistan's foreign policy towards a more neutral stance, aligning with the Movement of Non-Aligned Countries, and sought to develop relations with both the Soviet Union and the United States. Bhutto was keenly aware of Great Britain's policy of "divide and rule" and American policy of "unite and rule." In 1974, Bhutto, as prime minister, visited the Soviet Union. Prime Minister Bhutto deliberately worked to improve relations with the Soviet Union and the Communist bloc. The foundation stone for Pakistan Steel Mills was laid on 30 December 1973 by Bhutto. The Soviet Union sent advisors and experts to supervise the construction of the mega-project.

Though Richard Nixon maintained amicable relations with Bhutto, Pakistan's ties with the United States soured during Jimmy Carter's presidency as the US opposed Pakistan's nuclear program. Carter intensified the embargo on Pakistan and exerted pressure through the United States Ambassador to Pakistan, Brigadier-General Henry Byroade. Bhutto's socialist orientation irked the United States, concerned about losing Pakistan as an ally in the Cold War. When Carter was elected in 1976, he declared in his inaugural speech his intent to pursue a nuclear weapons ban. With Carter's election, Bhutto lost the connections to the United States administration that he had enjoyed during Nixon's term. Despite Carter's embargo on Pakistan, Bhutto persisted in acquiring materials for Pakistan's atomic bomb project, ultimately contributing to the breakdown of the Strategic Arms Limitation Talks.

===== Afghanistan =====
Zulfiqar with Afghan King Zahir Shah

In 1972, Bhutto initially attempted to forge friendly ties with Afghanistan, but these efforts were rebuffed in 1973. By 1974, Afghanistan covertly engaged in Pakistan's Khyber Pakhtunkhwa, causing increasing concern for Bhutto's government. Afghan President Dawood Khan's controversial Pashtunisation policies led to gruesome violence and civil disturbances in Pakistan. The ISI highlighted President Daud's support for anti-Pakistan militants, including backing Baloch separatists in the conflict. Consequently, Bhutto's government opted to retaliate, launching a covert counter-operation in 1974 under Major-General Naseerullah Babar, then Director-General of the M.I. Directorate-General for Western Fronts (DGWI). General Babar deemed it an excellent idea, with a significant impact on Afghanistan. The operation aimed to arm Islamic fundamentalists and instigate attacks across Afghanistan. In 1974, Bhutto authorised a covert operation in Kabul, where the Pakistan Air Force, AI, and the ISI successfully extradited Burhanuddin Rabbani, Jan Mohammad Khan, Gulbadin Hekmatyar, and Ahmad Shah Massoud to Peshawar. Fearful of Rabbani's potential assassination, this move took place amid heightened tensions.

By the end of 1974, Bhutto had given final authorisation for a covert operation to train Afghan mujaheddin, ultimately proving successful.

By 1976, Daud grew concerned about his country's overdependence on the Soviet Union and the rising insurgency. Bhutto's three-day state visit to Afghanistan in June 1976 was followed by Daud Khan's five-day visit to Pakistan in August 1976. An agreement on the resumption of air communications between Afghanistan and Pakistan was reached on 2 March 1977, signaling improved relations. Bhutto and Daud exchanged official visits to pressure Afghanistan to accept the Durand Line as the permanent border. However, these developments were interrupted by Bhutto's removal and Daud Khan's overthrow in a military coup shortly after. Western experts considered Bhutto's policy astute in addressing the border question, increasing pressure on Afghanistan and likely contributing to the Afghan government's move towards accommodation. Deputy Afghan Foreign Minister Abdul Samad Ghaus also admitted that, before the compromise, Afghanistan had been heavily involved inside Pakistan.

== Downfall and overthrow ==
=== Popular unrest ===
Bhutto faced mounting criticism and growing unpopularity during his term. Initially targeting opposition leader Abdul Wali Khan and his National Awami Party (NAP), a democratic socialist party, the socialist and communist masses under Bhutto's leadership began to disintegrate. Despite ideological similarities, clashes between them became increasingly farcical. The federal government ousted the NAP provincial government in Balochistan for alleged secessionist activities, leading to the ban on the NAP. Subsequently, much of the NAP top leadership was arrested, following the killing of Bhutto's confidant Hayat Khan Sherpao in a Peshawar bomb blast. Chief Justice Hamoodur Rahman also died of a cardiac arrest while in office. Between 1974 and 1976, many of Bhutto's original members left due to political differences or natural causes. In 1974, Bhutto's trusted Science Advisor Abdus Salam left Pakistan when Parliament declared Ahmadis as non-Muslims. Salam's departure slowed down nuclear weapons research as Dr. Mubashir Hassan, now Bhutto's appointed Science Advisor, focused more on politics than scientific research. Many civil bureaucrats and military officers loyal to Bhutto were replaced by new faces, leaving Bhutto with new advisers and collaborators.

Dissidence grew within the PPP, and the murder of dissident leader Ahmed Raza Kasuri's father triggered public outrage and intra-party hostility. Bhutto faced accusations of masterminding the crime. Prominent PPP leaders, including Ghulam Mustafa Khar, former governor of Punjab, openly condemned Bhutto, urging protests against his regime. The political crisis in the North-West Frontier Province and Balochistan escalated, with civil liberties suspended. An estimated 100,000 deployed troops faced accusations of human rights abuses and large-scale civilian casualties.

On 8 January 1977, the opposition coalesced into the Pakistan National Alliance (PNA), a nine-party coalition against Bhutto's government. Despite Bhutto calling for fresh elections, the PNA failed to secure a clear majority and disputed the results, accusing their opponents of rigging the election. Claiming that 40 seats in the national assembly were rigged, the dissidents boycotted the provincial elections, leading to low voter turnout. The PNA declared the newly elected Bhutto government illegitimate, with hard-line Islamist leaders like Maulana Maududi calling for Bhutto's overthrow. Bhutto's Science Advisor, Mubashir Hassan, feared a possible coup and unsuccessfully attempted to reach an agreement with the PNA. A crackdown on the conservative Pakistan Muslim League followed, initiated by Bhutto's government.

The president of the People's National Party and former Leader of the Opposition, Khan Abdul Wali Khan, viewed Bhutto's actions as his last stand against the PNA, leaving Bhutto and his colleagues isolated. In a public seminar, Vali Khan quoted, "There is one possible grave for two people ... let us see who gets in first." The Federal Security Force allegedly arrested or extrajudicially killed members of the Muslim League, leading to protest and civil unrest in Lahore, resulting in the People's Party losing administrative control over the city.

=== Military coup ===
On 3 July 1977, General Khalid Mahmud Arif secretly met with Bhutto, revealing that a coup was being planned in the General Combatant Headquarters (GHQ). General Arif urged Bhutto to "rush the negotiation with the PNA before it's too late." Growing political and civil disorder led Bhutto to engage in talks with PNA leaders, resulting in an agreement to dissolve the assemblies and hold fresh elections under a government of national unity. However, on 5 July 1977, Bhutto and his cabinet members were arrested by troops under the command of General Zia. Despite Bhutto reaching an agreement with the opposition, the coup took place on the pretext of unrest.

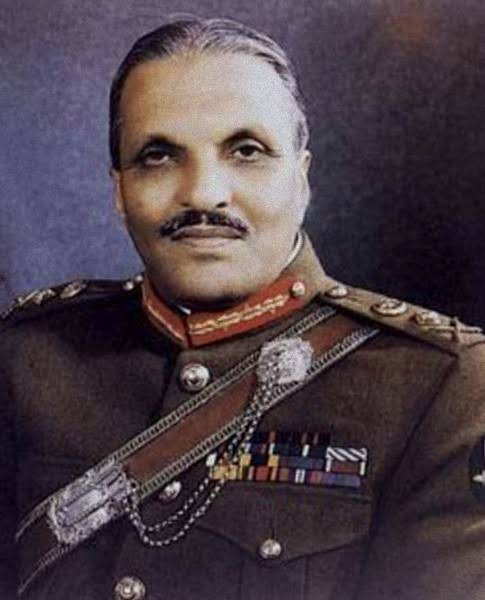
Zia-ul-Haq, military general, perpetrator of the 1977 military coup

Bhutto had intelligence within the Army, and officers like Major-General Tajamül Hussain Malik remained loyal to him until the end. Nevertheless, General Zia-ul-Haq initiated a training program with officers from the Special Air Service (SAS). Many of Bhutto's loyal officers were ordered to attend the first course. Senior officers' classes were delayed until midnight, and none were allowed to leave until late in the evening before the coup, during which arrangements were made.

General Zia declared martial law, suspended the constitution, dissolved all assemblies, and promised elections within ninety days. Zia ordered the arrest of senior PPP and PNA leaders but assured elections in October. Bhutto was released on 29 July and received a warm welcome from supporters in Larkana. He toured Pakistan, delivering speeches to large crowds and planning his political comeback. Bhutto was arrested again on 3 September and released on bail on 13 September. Fearing another arrest, he appointed his wife, Nusrat, as president of the Pakistan People's Party. Bhutto was imprisoned on 16 September, and many PPP leaders, including Mubashir Hassan, were arrested and disqualified from contesting elections. Observers noted that when Bhutto was removed from power in July 1977, thousands of Pakistanis cheered and celebrated.

== Trial and execution ==
On 5 July 1977, General Muhammad Zia-ul-Haq led a military coup, removing Bhutto from power and detaining him for a month. Zia promised new elections within 90 days but continuously postponed them, asserting that Bhutto's party wouldn't return to power if he participated.

Upon release, Bhutto toured the country, addressing adulatory crowds of PPP supporters. Banned from train travel due to delays caused by these gatherings, Bhutto's last visit to Multan marked a turning point. Despite administration efforts to block the gathering, the crowd's size led to disorder, providing a pretext for Bhutto's arrest, claiming it was necessary for his safety.

On 3 September, Bhutto was arrested again, charged with authorising the murder of Nawab Muhammad Ahmed Khan Kasuri in March 1974. The charges were deemed "questionable" by some scholars, including Vali Nasr. A politician, Ahmed Raza Kasuri, claimed he was the target of the attack orchestrated by Bhutto. Bhutto's wife, Nusrat Bhutto, assembled a defense team, securing his release after ten days due to contradictory evidence. However, Bhutto was arrested again under martial law, leading to the cancellation of upcoming elections.

Arraigned before the Lahore High Court, Bhutto was denied a lower court appeal level. The trial, lasting five months, began on 24 October 1977, with key witness testimony from Masood Mahmood, director general of the Federal Security Force. Irregularities, alleged torture, and inconsistent confessions marred the trial. Former U.S. attorney general Ramsey Clark observed numerous irregularities and lack of corroborating evidence. When Bhutto began testifying on 25 January 1978, Chief Justice Maulvi Mushtaq, presiding over the trial, closed the courtroom to observers. Bhutto, alleging bias, demanded a retrial, but the court refused.

=== Death sentence and appeal ===
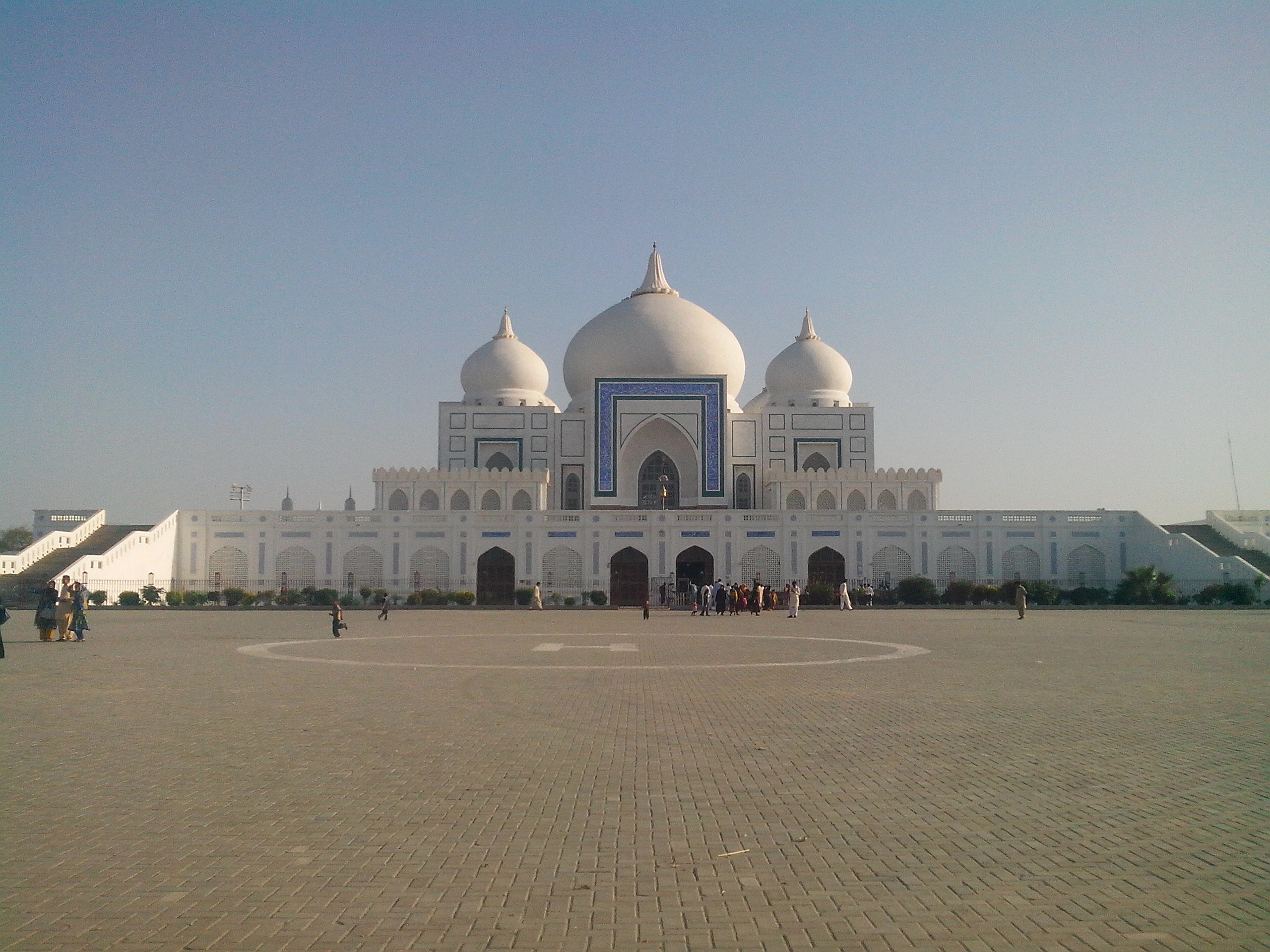
The Mausoleum of Zulfikar Ali Bhutto and other Bhutto family members in Garhi Khuda Bakhsh, Sindh

On 18 March 1978, Bhutto was pronounced guilty of murder and was sentenced to death. Bhutto's former Legal Minister, Abdul Hafiz Pirzada petitioned the Supreme Court for the release of Bhutto's Science Adviser, Mubashir Hassan, and to review Bhutto's death sentence based on the split decision. The Supreme Court denied Hassan's release because he was held by Military Police, but the court agreed to hear the arguments. After 12 days of proceedings, the Supreme Court concluded that the president of Pakistan can change a death sentence into life imprisonment. Pirzada filed an application to then-chief martial law administrator. However, General Zia-ul-Haq did not act immediately and claimed that the application had gone missing.

Devastated, Pirzada relayed the news to Bhutto, disclosing General Zia-ul-Haq's intentions. Consequently, Bhutto chose not to pursue an appeal. As he was transferred to a cell in Rawalpindi central jail, his family appealed on his behalf, leading to a Supreme Court hearing in May. Bhutto was granted one week to prepare, issuing a comprehensive rejoinder to the charges, although Zia impeded its publication. Chief Justice S. Anwarul Haq adjourned the court until the end of July 1978, purportedly because five of the nine appeal court judges were inclined to overturn the Lahore verdict, with one pro-Bhutto judge set to retire in July.

I did not kill that man. My God is aware of it. I am big enough to admit if I had done it, that admission would have been less of an ordeal and humiliation than this barbarous trial which no self respecting man can endure. I am a Muslim. A Muslim's fate is in the hands of God Almighty. I can face Him with a clear conscience and tell Him that I rebuilt His Islamic State of Pakistan from ashes into a respectable Nation. I am entirely at peace with my conscience in this black hole of Kot Lakhpat. I am not afraid of death. You have seen what fires I have passed through.

— Zulfikar Ali Bhutto, My Dearest Daughter: A letter from the Death Cell,

The appeal concluded on 23 December 1978. On 6 February 1979, the Supreme Court voted 4–3, delivering a guilty verdict. Bhutto's defender, Ramsey Clark, noted that during the appeal, "not one witness was re‐examined, nor did the court rectify" what he called "the glaring defects of the lower court's proceedings." Clark also highlighted that two of the Supreme Court's nine justices were absent from the decision, both showing signs of having been forced to not participate. One judge who had earlier remarked that he would not succumb to pressure retired in the fall of 1978 even though judicial propriety demanded that his leaving the Court be deferred until the conclusion of the case. The other judge was prevented from sitting in the Court from November because of an illness pronounced by a government‐appointed medical board. If they had been present and voted not guilty in a 5–4 decision, Bhutto would have gone free. The Bhutto family had seven days to appeal, and the court granted a stay of execution while studying the petition. Appeals for clemency arrived from many heads of state by 24 February 1979 when the next court hearing began, but Zia dismissed them as "trade union activity" among politicians.

On 24 March 1979, the Supreme Court dismissed the appeal, and Zia upheld the death sentence. Bhutto was hanged at Central Jail Rawalpindi on 4 April 1979, after enduring severe torture in jail, leading to vomiting and intense chest pain, and he was laid to rest at his family mausoleum in Garhi Khuda Baksh.

During his imprisonment, Bhutto's children Murtaza and Benazir worked tirelessly to garner international support for their father's release. Libya's Colonel Gaddafi dispatched his Prime Minister Abdus Salam Jalloud on an urgent mission to Pakistan for talks with the military establishment to secure Bhutto's release. In a press conference, Jalloud revealed that Gaddafi had proposed to exile Bhutto to Libya, and the Presidential aircraft awaited Bhutto at the Islamabad International Airport. However, after a week at the airport, General Zia rejected Jalloud's request and upheld the death sentence. Bhutto's execution shocked much of the Muslim world. In his final speech before being hanged, Bhutto's last words were: "Oh Lord, help me for... I am innocent".

=== Re-opening of the Bhutto trial ===
On 2 April 2011, 32 years after Bhutto's trial and execution, the PPP (the ruling party at that time) filed a petition at the Supreme Court of Pakistan (SCP) to reopen Bhutto's trial. Senior journalist Iftikhar Ahmad aired a series of televised interviews on Geo News with those who played significant and often controversial roles in Bhutto's death. Prime Minister Yusuf Raza Gilani's cabinet organised a legal team to seek the reopening of the trial. President Asif Ali Zardari consented to the resulting presidential order under Article 186 of the Constitution, and the Supreme Court took up the petition on 13 April 2011. Chief Justice Iftikhar Chaudhry eventually presided over the three-judge bench (expanded with law experts from four provinces of Pakistan), while Minister of Law Babar Awan counseled Bhutto's case.

Immediately, Babar Awan resigned from his position as Law Minister, opting to leave the Justice Ministry entirely to independently counsel Bhutto's case. Chief Justice Iftikhar Chaudhry commended this move by the senior PPP leadership, labeling it as "historic" in his noting remarks. In a significant development, the Supreme Court transferred the decision on the legal status of Bhutto's execution to a larger bench yet to be formed.

Following a series of hearings at the Supreme Court, the case was adjourned and eventually dismissed after the PPP sanctioned the suspension of Babar Awan on 2 May 2012.

On 6 March 2024, a nine-member SCP bench, headed by Chief Justice of Pakistan, Qazi Faez Isa, in response to the presidential reference provided an opinion that Bhutto was not provided a fair trial as mentioned in Article 4 and 9 of the Constitution of Pakistan.

== Personal life ==
In 1943, he entered into his first marriage to his cousin Shireen Amir Begum, in 1943, at the time she was ten years his senior. The couple had no children.

On 8 September 1951, Bhutto married Nusrat Ispahani of Iranian Kurdish origin in Karachi. Their first child, Benazir, was born in 1953, followed by Murtaza in 1954, Sanam in 1957, and Shahnawaz in 1958.

== Reception and legacy ==
The foundation stone was laid by Gomal University in honour of Bhutto.

Bhutto remains a complex and debated figure in Pakistan. While lauded for his nationalism, he faced criticism for suppressing political opponents. In 1971, when he assumed control, Pakistan was in disarray after a brutal civil war. Critics blamed his socialist policies for economic setbacks, but Bhutto argued he addressed inequality from previous regimes.

Controversially, some attribute Bhutto for the Bangladesh Liberation War. General Zia-ul-Haq released General Yahya Khan in 1977, who accused Bhutto of breaking Pakistan in 1971. Bhutto also faces criticism for human-rights abuses in Baluchistan.

Internationally, Bhutto is viewed positively as a secular internationalist. Bhutto successfully united parties for the 1973 constitution and pursued nuclear weapons, earning him the title of the father of Pakistan's nuclear program.

While his legacy is contested, Bhutto is hailed for his accomplishments. Some, like former statesman Roedad Khan, commend his early achievements but note a decline later on. His family, active in politics, faced tragedy with the assassinations of Benazir Bhutto in 2007 and Murtaza Bhutto in 1996.

Despite criticisms, Bhutto remains a revered figure in Pakistan's collective memory, symbolising influence in public, scientific, and political spheres. His family continues its political legacy, with Bilawal Bhutto Zardari serving as the Foreign Minister of Pakistan from April 2022 to August 2023.

== Honours ==
- Pakistan: Grand Cross with Collar of the Order of Pakistan (awarded posthumously in March 2025)

=== Eponyms ===
These institutions stand as tributes to Bhutto's legacy:

- Shaheed Zulfiqar Ali Bhutto Institute of Science and Technology, Karachi, Sindh.
- ZA Bhutto Agricultural College, Larkana, Sindh.
- Zulfiqarabad, a planned city in Larkana District, named in memory of Bhutto.

== Books ==
- Peace-Keeping by the United Nations, Pakistan Publishing House, Karachi, 1967
- Political Situation in Pakistan, Veshasher Prakashan, New Delhi, 1968
- The Myth of Independence, Oxford University Press, Karachi and Lahore, 1969
- The Great Tragedy, Pakistan People's Party, Karachi, 1971
- Marching Towards Democracy, (collections of speeches), 1972
- Politics of the People (speeches, statements and articles), 1948–1971
- The Third World: New Directions, Quartet Books, London, 1977
- My Pakistan, Biswin Sadi Publications, New Delhi, 1979
- If I Am Assassinated, Vikas, New Delhi, 1979 on-line Archived 18 October 2017 at the Wayback Machine
- My Execution, Musawaat Weekly International, London, 1980
- New Directions, Narmara Publishers, London, 1980

== See also ==
- Ghinwa Bhutto
- Nusrat Bhutto
- List of presidents of Pakistan
- List of prime ministers of Pakistan
- Movement for the Restoration of Democracy

== Bibliography ==
- Bhutto, Zulfikar Ali (1969). The Myth of Independence. Oxford University Press.
- Raza, Syed Rasul (2008). Zulfiqar Ali Bhutto; The Architect of New Pakistan. Karachi, Sindh Province, Pakistan: Printwise publication. ISBN 978-969-8500-00-9.

Party political offices
New office	Leader of the Pakistan Peoples Party; 1967–1979	Succeeded by Nusrat Bhutto
Political offices
Preceded by Muhammad Ali Bogra	Minister of Foreign Affairs; 1963–1966	Succeeded by Sharifuddin Pirzada
Preceded by Yahya Khan	President of Pakistan; 1971–1973	Succeeded by Fazal Ilahi Chaudhry
Preceded by Yahya Khan	Chief Martial Law Administrator; 1971–1973	Succeeded by Muhammad Zia-ul-Haq
Preceded by Yahya Khan	Minister of Foreign Affairs; 1971–1977	Succeeded by Aziz Ahmed
Preceded by Yahya Khan	Minister of Defence; 1971–1977	Succeeded by Muhammad Zia-ul-Haq
Preceded by Sardar Abdur Rashid Khan	Minister of the Interior; 1971–1972	Succeeded by Abdul Qayyum Khan
Preceded by Abdul Jabbar Khan	Speaker of the National Assembly; 1972–1973	Succeeded by Fazal Ilahi Chaudhry
Preceded by Nurul Amin	Prime Minister of Pakistan; 1973–1977	Succeeded by Muhammad Khan Junejo
Preceded by Abdul Qayyum Khan	Minister of the Interior; 1977	Succeeded by Inamul Haq Khan
