= 2021 in religion =

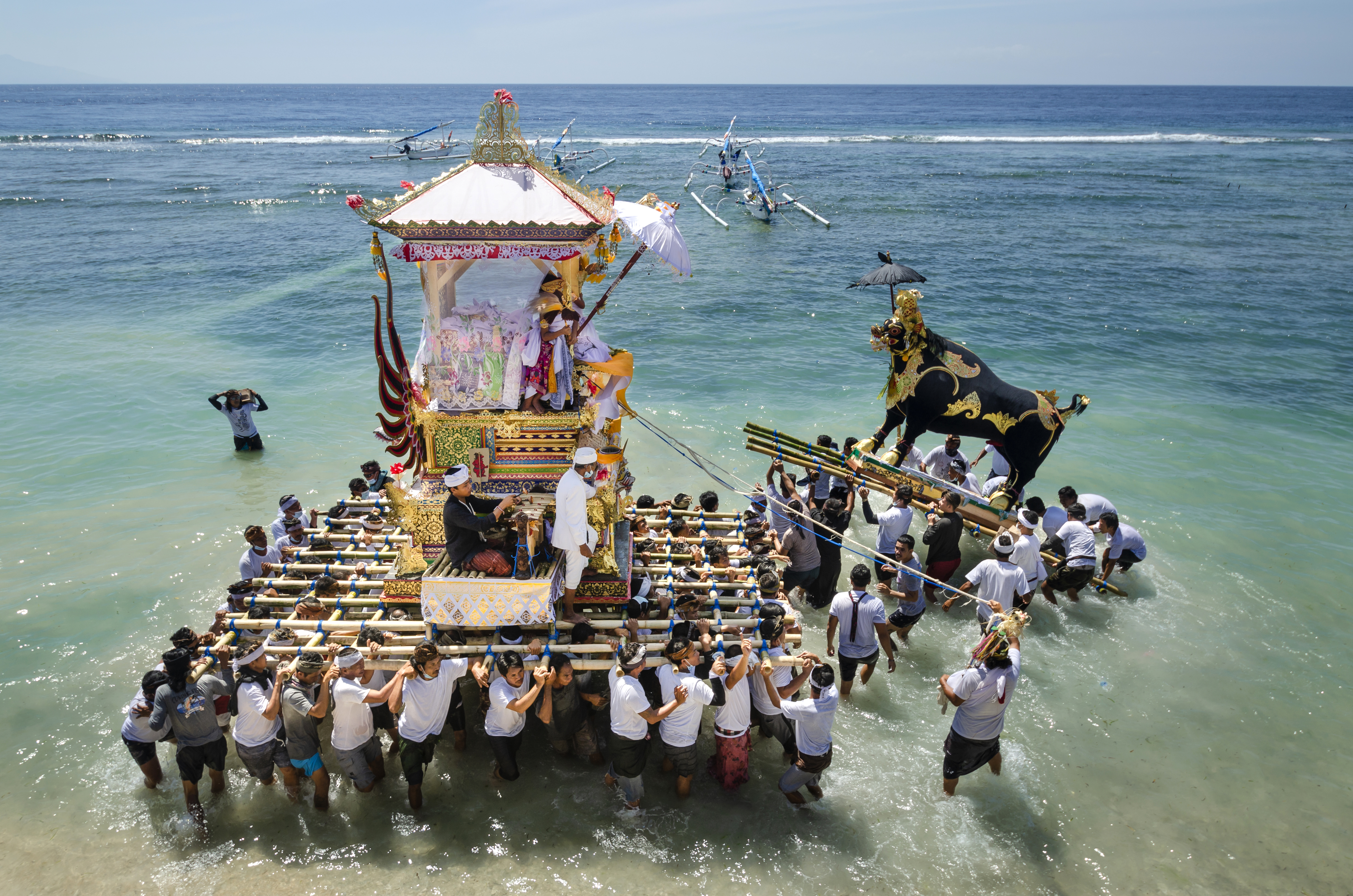
Ngaben in Nusa Penida, Bali.

This is a timeline of events during the year 2021 which relate to religion.

== Events ==
- 1 January – The Alliance of Reformed Churches splits from the Reformed Church in America in opposition to its tolerance of LGBT practitioners.
- 11 January – Pope Francis issues the Spiritus Domini, allowing women to serve as lectors and acolytes in the Catholic Church.
- 5 March – Pope Francis becomes the first Pope to visit Iraq.
- 4 April – The 500 Years of Christianity in the Philippines celebrations begin, marking the quincentennial of Christianity's arrival in the nation.
- 11 April – Mass protests break out in Pakistan after the Pakistani government declined to sever ties with France for blasphemy.
- 13 May – The interdenominational Christian Ökumenischer Kirchentag 2021 convention is held in Frankfurt with most participants attending digitally.
- 28 May – Taksim Mosque is inaugurated in Istanbul, Turkey after decades of debate surrounding its creation.
- 1 June – Pope Francis issues the Pascite gregem Dei.
- 16 July – The Ghana National Mosque, the second largest mosque in West Africa, opens in Accra.
- 15 August – The Taliban retakes power in Afghanistan after the withdrawal of United States troops, imposing strict religious law on the nation.
- 11 September – Megan Rohrer becomes a Lutheran bishop, the first openly transgender person to do so.
- 19 September – The Church of Sweden holds elections for its assembly.
- 8 October – A member of Islamic State – Khorasan Province carries out a suicide bombing at a Shiite mosque in Kunduz, Afghanistan.
- 13 October – Hindus and Hindu temples are attacked throughout Bangladesh after a Quran is found under a Hindu idol.
- 15 October – A member of Islamic State – Khorasan Province carries out a suicide bombing at a Shiite mosque in Kandahar, Afghanistan.
- 22 October – Mass protests break out in Pakistan after the Pakistani government declined to sever ties with France for blasphemy.
- 3 December – A Sri Lankan national is lynched in Pakistan after being accused of blasphemy.
- 10 December – The Cathedral of Our Lady of Arabia, the largest cathedral in the Persian Gulf region, is inaugurated in Bahrain.

== See also ==
- 2021 in Vatican City
- Impact of the COVID-19 pandemic on religion
