= 1977 Pakistan uprising =

1977 revolution in Pakistan

- Part of Cold War
- Date: 7 March – 5 July 1977
- Location: Nationwide
- Caused by: Allegations of rigging in the 1977 Pakistani general election; Nationalisation policies of Zulfikar Ali Bhutto; Political suppression through the Federal Security Force; Hyderabad tribunal; Murder of Ahmed Khan Kasuri
- Goals: Nizam-e-Mustafa; Resignation of Zulfikar Ali Bhutto; Free, fair, and fresh elections; Restoration of civil liberties; Release of political prisoners
- Methods: Demonstrations; Riots; Arson; Vandalism
- Result: 1977 Pakistani military coup; Trial and execution of Zulfikar Ali Bhutto

Parties
Opposition: Pakistan National Alliance: Tehreek-e-Istiqlal; Jamaat-e-Islami Pakistan; Jamiat Ulema-e-Islam; Jamiat Ulema-e-Pakistan; Pakistan Muslim League; National Democratic Party; Pakistan Democratic Party; Khaksar movement; All Jammu and Kashmir Muslim Conference	Government: Pakistan People's Party	Pakistan Army

Lead figures
Asghar Khan; Abul A'la Maududi; Mufti Mehmood; Ahmad Nurani; Chaudhry Zahoor Elahi; Sherbaz Khan Mazari; Nawabzada Nasrullah Khan; Khan Ashraf Khan; Muhammad Abdul Qayyum Khan	Zulfikar Ali Bhutto	Zia-ul-Haq

Casualties and losses
200–300 killed 30,000 arrested		

The 1977 Pakistan uprising, also known as the Pakistani Revolution of 1977, was a series of protests against the results of the 1977 Pakistani general election and Prime Minister Zulfikar Ali Bhutto in Pakistan.

The protests first erupted against Bhutto and the results of the election. After a wave of popular uprisings and massive demonstrations, the government ordered the military, including tanks, to be deployed. Anti-Bhutto protests continued for two months without any violence until June, when 50 were killed in clashes and intense violence at protests. The increasingly violent street demonstrations were characterised by riots and street protests while police clashed and ordered a crackdown on the demonstrators, using live ammunition, pellet ammunition and rubber bullets to disperse protesters while protests consisted of looting, arson attacks and violence.

More than 100 protesters were killed in strike actions and massive labour unrest during the bloody crisis. The uprising ultimately led to Operation Fair Play, an army coup which overthrew Bhutto.

== See also ==
- 1968 movement in Pakistan
