= 2021 Pakistani protests =

Series of protests and strikes in Pakistan

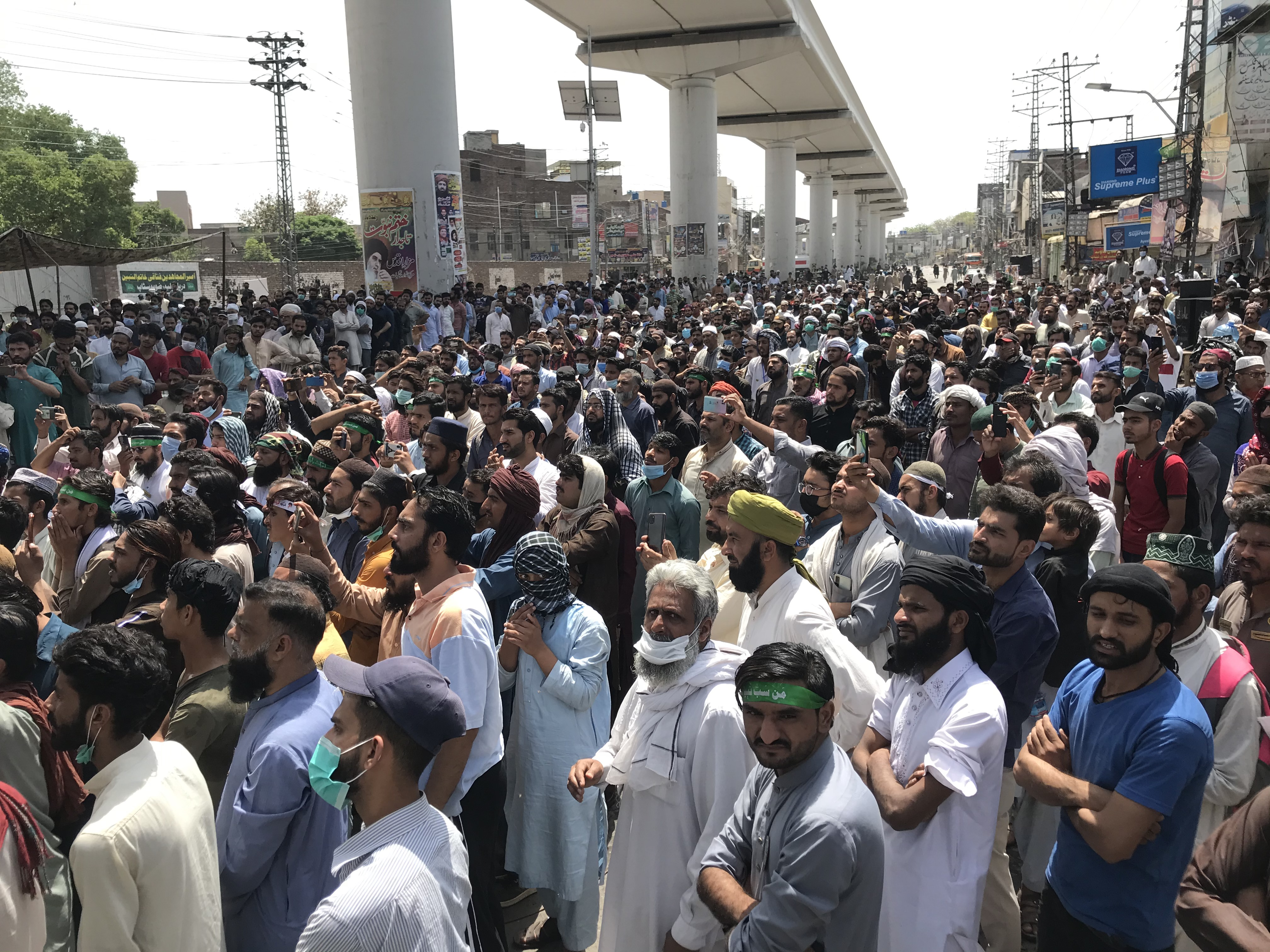
- Date: 11–20 April 2021
- Location: Countrywide
- Caused by: Blasphemy; Government mishandling of the COVID-19 pandemic
- Goals: Expulsion of French ambassador; Lift the ban on Tehreek-e-Labbaik Pakistan
- Methods: Sit-in, protest, strikes, rioting

Parties
Tehreek-e-Labbaik Pakistan	Government of Pakistan

Lead figures
Saad Hussain Rizvi	Imran Khan

Casualties
- Deaths: 3 (including 2 police)
- Injuries: 40+ police and 100+ protestors injured
- Arrested: 100+

The 2021 Pakistani protests were a series of protests and strikes in Pakistan from 11 to 20 April 2021. Mass protests first erupted after a series of calls for nationwide rallies and picketing against the government of Prime Minister Imran Khan and his cabinet, orchestrated by banned far-right party Tehreek-e-Labaik Pakistan (TLP) The primary motive was against France after a supposed blasphemous caricature was published there and the events surrounding the murder of Samuel Paty, a French middle school teacher. The demonstrators demanded a boycott of French goods and the expulsion of the French ambassador.

The protests intensified across Pakistan after the party's leader Saad Hussain Rizvi was arrested on 12 April 2021. It ended on 20 April 2021 when the expulsion of the French envoy was agreed to be discussed in the parliament.

== Background ==
In October 2020, French teacher Samuel Paty was beheaded near Paris reportedly for displaying a cartoon of Muhammad. French President Emmanuel Macron defended freedom of expression and the rights to publish such cartoons, after which widespread protests took place in the Islamic world with calls to boycott French products. In November 2020, activists of the far-right Islamist party Tehreek-e-Labbaik Pakistan (TLP) blocked an entrance to Islamabad and demanded the expulsion of French ambassador from Pakistan and severing diplomatic ties. The protests were called off on 16 November 2020 after the Government of Pakistan reached an agreement with TLP by seeking more time to discuss the matter in parliament.

== Events ==
After French President Emmanuel Macron took a hardened stance against radical Islamists, the founder of the TLP, Khadim Hussain Rizvi called on Pakistan to cut diplomatic relations with France, He asked his followers to protest in the streets of Pakistan's capital, Islamabad. A few days later, he died due to illness, and the protests became more violent under the aegis of his son, Saad Hussain Rizvi.

On 11 April 2021, Saad Rizvi released a video message asking TLP activists to launch protests across Pakistan if the government did not expel the French ambassador from the country by 20 April. On 12 April, after Rizvi was arrested in Lahore charged under Pakistan's Anti-Terrorism Act, 1997 (ATA), which further angered protesters, causing widespread unrest. Protests broke out across the country, with TLP activists blocking transport routes and cutting off cities including Lahore, Dina, Islamabad, Peshawar and Gujranwala from each other. The protests turned violent with reports of stone pelting; at least two people were killed in the riots on 12 April. In addition, TLP claimed that two protesters were shot dead in Faisalabad and Karachi. Later, a TLP spokesperson said that at least four people were killed, hundreds were injured and thousands were arrested by the police.

On 13 April, one police officer was beaten to death by the rioting mob in Lahore, while 40 others were injured. TLP spokesperson Tayyab Rizvi claimed that the number of TLP workers "martyred" in the protests by the second day had increased to 12. A spokesperson of Punjab Police confirmed that two cops were killed by the protesters who used clubs, bricks and firearms to attack them. Paramilitary forces were brought in to assist the local police across various cities including Lahore, Gujranwala, Dina, Rawalpindi and Bahawalpur.

The Pakistani government banned the TLP on 15 April, accusing them of terrorism as their protestors had engaged in street violence and attacked public law enforcers. However, the ban does not enable the Pakistani government to entirely dissolve the political party, for which it needs a mandate for the Pakistani Supreme Court. Pakistan temporarily banned social media for four hours on 16 April in an attempt to curb the protests, as the TLP has wide social media penetration. Later, it banned coverage of the TLP by local media. On the same day, the Pakistani government released an alleged statement by Saad Rizvi, asking protestors to stand down and peacefully disperse. But several demonstrators expressed their disbelief in the statement, insisting on seeing or hearing it coming from Rizvi himself. TLP supporters in Britain staged a protest near the Pakistan High Commission in London on 16 April.

On 18 April, the Pakistani police claimed that the TLP had taken six security personnel hostage in Lahore, including a senior police officer and two paramilitary soldiers. Later that day, Interior Minister Sheikh Rasheed Ahmad said that 11 policemen who were taken hostage by TLP had been released after negotiations between Government of Punjab and TLP.

== Aftermath and reactions ==
France advised its citizens and French companies to temporarily leave Pakistan due to the violent protests' and serious threats. However, several French nationals refused to leave the country, stating that the threats were from TLP radicals, but not from the ordinary citizens. An anonymous Pakistani diplomat speaking to the French newspaper, Le Figaro, said that their country's [Pakistan's] international reputation was deteriorating due the actions of the TLP. Pakistani Taliban came out in support of TLP protesters and stated, "we will make [the government] accountable for every drop of the martyrs' blood."

The government has reportedly reached an agreement with TLP to end the protests and the government has agreed to table a resolution regarding the expulsion of the French ambassador in the national assembly. TLP member Shafiq Amini requested all demonstrators to disperse and keep the peace. However, the government refused to lift the ban on the organisation.

== See also ==
- October 2021 Tehreek-e-Labbaik Pakistan protests
- 1968 movement in Pakistan
- 1977 Pakistan uprising
