= Maulvi Mushtaq Hussain =

Pakistani judge

Maulvi Mushtaq Hussain (Urdu: مولوی مشتاق حسین) was a Pakistani jurist who served as chief justice of the Lahore High Court. Most notably in his career as a judge, he presided over the trial of former prime minister of Pakistan, Zulfiqar Ali Bhutto.

== Murder conspiracy court case ==
In September 1977, two months after General Zia Ul-Haq toppled and deposed the Bhutto regime in a military coup earlier on 5 July 1977, an almost three-year-old local police report registered on 11 November 1974 at Ichhra police station in Lahore, of Ahmed Khan Kasuri's murder was dug up and used as a pretext to arrest Bhutto.

In that police report (known in Pakistan as a First Information Report or an FIR), lodged by Bhutto's political opponent Ahmed Raza Kasuri, former prime minister Zulfiqar Ali Bhutto was allegedly implicated in a conspiracy to murder the FIR complainant Ahmed Raza Kasuri. It was alleged in that FIR that when the actual murder plan was carried out, the complainant's father Ahmed Khan Kasuri was mistakenly murdered instead of the intended murder conspiracy target, Ahmed Raza Kasuri who remained unhurt.

However, Bhutto was released after a judge, Justice KMA Samadani, found the evidence to be contradictory and incomplete.

Three days later the Zia government again arrested the ousted prime minister. This time the arrest was made on the testimonies given by five members of the Federal Security Force (Pakistan) (FSF), including its head. One of the men, however turned hostile against the prosecution and accused the police and the Zia dictatorship of 'extracting false testimonies (from the FSF members) under torture'.

Nevertheless, the trial that ran for five months and was headed by a staunch anti-Bhutto Lahore High Court judge, Maulvi Mushtaq Hussain, who sentenced Bhutto to death.

== Controversial death sentence ==
Later in 2011, it was claimed by Pakistan Peoples Party member and attorney Babar Awan that Zulfiqar Ali Bhutto had written different applications and letters to the then Punjab governor requesting him to transfer his case to another court after highlighting bias of Justice Maulvi Mushtaq Hussain against him. Babar Awan read out these applications and letters in the Supreme Court of Pakistan in front of then Chief Justice Iftikhar Muhammad Chaudhry who was holding a hearing to revisit the case, in 2011, to determine whether the 1977 trial was fairly conducted. This 2011 court hearing was related to the controversial death sentence handed down to Zulfiqar Ali Bhutto.

In this 2011 hearing, the Chief Justice also asked Babar Awan if there was "something personal" between Zulfiqar Ali Bhutto and Justice Maulvi Mushtaq Hussain. Babar Awan was asked by the court to make a proper formulation of his case to establish Maulvi Mushtaq Hussain's bias against Bhutto.

It was also claimed during this hearing that Justice Maulvi Mushtaq Hussain had earlier developed a bias against the Bhutto government because he was ignored for promotion, instead a judge much-junior-to-him was promoted during the Bhutto government. After this, Justice Maulvi Mushtaq took a leave of absence from his job and went to Switzerland and spent two years there but returned to Pakistan immediately after Bhutto government was toppled.

Upon Maulvi Mushtaq's return to Pakistan, General Zia Ul-Haq elevated him to be the Chief Justice of the Lahore High Court so he could preside over Bhutto's trial.
