= Awan (tribe) =

Pakistani community and surname

Awan اعوان
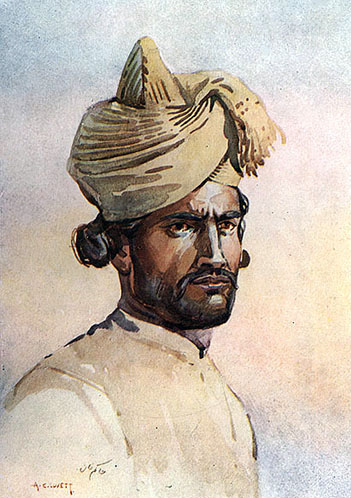
- Watercolour of an Awan sepoy, named Hakim Khan, painted by Major A.C. Lovett, circa 1908. The painting is included in the book, The Armies of India (published in 1911).
- Location: Punjab, Hazara, Azad Kashmir and Sindh
- Language: Hindko, Punjabi, Urdu
- Religion: Islam

Awan (Urdu: اعوان) is a community hailing from and mainly based in the northern Punjab and neighbouring areas of Pakistan. The name Awan is used as a surname by the community.

== History ==
Jamal J. Elias notes that the Awans believe themselves to be of Arab origin, descended from Ali ibn Abu Talib and that the claim of Arab descent gives them "high status in the Indian Muslim environment".

Christophe Jaffrelot says:

The Awan deserve close attention, because of their historical importance and, above all, because they settled in the west, right up to the edge of Baluchi and Pashtun territory. Legend has it that their origins go back to Imam Ali and his second wife, Hanafiya. Historians describe them as valiant warriors and farmers who imposed their supremacy on the Janjua in part of the Salt Range and established large colonies all along the Indus to Sind, and a densely populated center not far from Lahore.

People of the Awan community have a strong presence in the Pakistan Army and a notable martial tradition. They were listed as an "agricultural tribe" by the British Raj in 1925, a term that was then synonymous with classification as a "martial race".

== Notable people ==
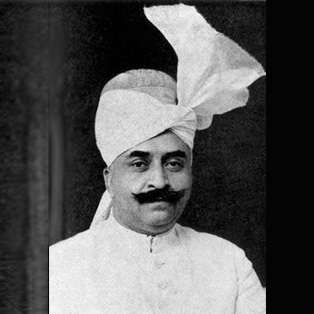
Amir Mohammad Khan, former Nawab of Kalabagh, Chief of the Awan tribe, Governor of West Pakistan from 1960 to 1966

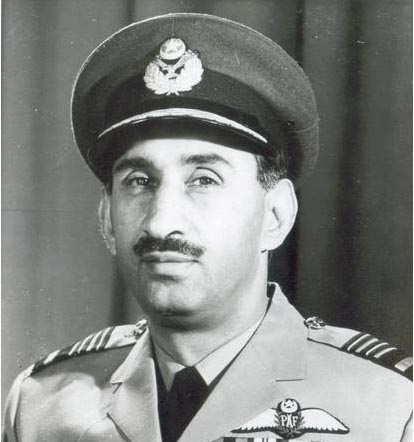
Air Marshal Nur Khan, Commander in Chief of the Pakistan Air Force, 1965–69, Governor of West Pakistan, 1969–70

- Amir Mohammad Khan – Former Nawab of Kalabagh, chief of the Awan tribe and Governor of West Pakistan from 1960 to 1966.
- Nur Khan – Commander-in-chief of the Pakistan Air Force, 1965–69, Governor of West Pakistan, 1969–70, and recipient of the Hilal-i-Jurat, the second-highest military award of Pakistan.
- Tajammul Hussain Malik, veteran of the Indo-Pakistani War of 1965, held the defence in the Battle of Hilli against a larger force, refused to surrender and attempted coup against the military dictatorship of the 1980s
- Mir Sultan Khan – chess master
- Ahmad Nadeem Qasmi – Urdu poet, journalist, literary critic, dramatist, short story author, recipient of the Pride of Performance and Sitara-e-Imtiaz, the third-highest civil award of Pakistan.
- Sultan Bahu – A Sufi mystic, poet, and founder of Sarwari Qadiri.
- Khadim Hussain Rizvi – A Pakistani Islamic scholar and the founder of Tehreek-e-Labbaik Pakistan.
- Ameer Muhammad Akram Awan – Islamic scholar and spiritual leader of Naqshbandia Owaisiah.
- Saad Hussain Rizvi, Pakistani far-right politician
- Abdul Mannan Wazirabadi – Islamic scholar, faqīh and muhaddith.
- Dilip Kumar –Actor in Hindi cinema.
- Babar Awan – Pakistani politician and lawyer
- Malik Munawar Khan Awan – Pakistan army officer who fought for independence of Azad Hind against the British Raj and a decorated soldier awarded for gallantry for conquering areas of the Kashmir Valley in the Indo-Pakistani war of 1965
- Muhammad Akram NH – Pakistani martyr soldier who commanded a regiment at Hilli, East Pakistan and was post-humously awarded the highest military honour of the country

== See also ==
- List of Punjabi Muslim tribes
- Awan Patti
