= Lynching of Priyantha Kumara =

Sri-Lankan man lynched in Pakistan

- Date: 3 December 2021
- Location: Wazirabad Road, Sialkot, Punjab, Pakistan
- Charges: 131 arrested

Diyawadanage Don Nandasiri Priyantha Kumara was a 49-year-old Sri Lankan manager who was lynched by supporters of the Tehreek-e-Labbaik Pakistan (TLP) on 3 December 2021 in Sialkot, Punjab, Pakistan, over allegations of blasphemy. TLP later officially distanced itself from the incident.

The Anti-Terrorism Court in Lahore later gave the death sentence to six who were involved in the lynching while nine others received life sentences. An additional 72 people were also sentenced to two years in prison.

Kumara, who was an ethnic Sinhalese and a Buddhist by faith and had lived and worked in Pakistan for eleven years, was beaten, killed and later set on fire by a mob in Sialkot. He had been accused of blasphemy for removing a poster featuring religious content. It was later revealed that Kumara had removed the poster due to pending renovation work in the building, and was falsely accused of blasphemy by workers of the factory. Several videos started to circulate on social media in which hundreds of men can be seen gathered at the site, chanting slogans of the TLP. He was employed by the Rajco Sporting Goods Manufacturing Company, which was later selected as the official manufacturer of the official kits for the Pakistani national cricket team in 2023 Cricket World Cup.

== Biography ==
Diyawadanage Don Nandasiri Priyantha Kumara was a resident of Ganemulla, Gampaha District, Sri Lanka. He was the youngest of six siblings. He graduated from the University of Peradeniya in 2002 as a production engineer and had been working in Pakistan since 2010. He had worked for the Rajco Sporting Goods Manufacturing Company in Sialkot since 2012, progressing from an engineering role to a manager role. At the time of his murder, he was the General Superintendent (General Manager) at the Rajco Industries garment factory in Sialkot. He was married to Nilushi Dissanayaka and the father of two sons, aged 14 and 9 years (as of 2021). Two of his brothers were also working in Pakistan at the time, as employees of a textile factory in Faisalabad, Punjab.

== Incident ==
=== Background ===
The Government of Pakistan had earlier banned Tehreek-e-Labbaik Pakistan (TLP), A Barelvi organization whose main focus is attacking those accused of blasphemy, declaring TLP a militant organization after several run-ins with the state. Later however, it decided to lift the ban after signing an agreement with the organisation in November 2021 amid violent protests.

=== Mob and murder ===
According to Naveed Walter is the president of Human Rights Focus Pakistan (HRFP), witnesses interviewed by his organization told them that Kumara had asked one of the factory supervisors to help him clean up the factory premises – "clean the bathrooms, paint, whitewash… And during that time, all of the things hanging on the walls, they removed them – including any stickers, posters, anything". Since Kumara was Sri Lankan, not Pakistani, he didn't understand the local language well enough to understand what the posters said. The local factory supervisor did understand and "gathered his coworkers and others in the town" to tell them what had happened.

According to Rao Sardar Ali Khan, Inspector General of Police of the Punjab Police, a mob of 800 men gathered at the Rajco factory at 10:00 on 3 December 2021 after it was reported that Kumara had torn a poster inscribed with Islamic verses and that constituted blasphemy. The mob searched for Kumara, finding him on the roof of the factory. They had dragged him while beating him severely, he was dead by 11:28 and his body was set on fire by the mob on the Wazirabad Road. Members of the mob proudly told media at the scene that their act was a tribute to Muhammad.

Despite the fact that "the attack took a long time", as the mob gathered, chased and beat Kumara, who escaped for a time and hid, according to Naveed Walter, president of Human Rights Focus Pakistan (HRFP),

there was no police, no security agency, no state actors. People called the emergency number but the police did not arrive for 20 minutes. One of the officers on patrol admitted they were unable to control the mob. The government has no strategy to deal with mob violence and religious fanaticism. It happens again and again.

The crowd chanted slogans used by Barelvi Islamist Tehreek-e-Labbaik Pakistan party ("I am present Pakistan" in Urdu). According to France24, "a man took responsibility for the murder in an interview with several television stations, before beginning to shout 'Labbaik, Labbaik' along with the crowd".

Malik Adnan, a deputy manager at the factory attempted to save Kumara's life as he confronted the mob and argued with them to spare him, however, he was outnumbered and was unable to save Kumara. The efforts of Malik Adnan were recognized by Government of Pakistan and Tamgha-i-Shujaat for 'moral courage and bravery. Malik Adnan was conferred upon Tamgha-i-Shujaat on 24 March 2022 by the President of Pakistan.

== Investigation and arrests ==
Farhan Idrees was identified as the main culprit who was one of the masterminds involved in the incident and over 100 individuals were arrested by the police. It was revealed that all of them who were arrested had link with TLP. Kumara's body was flown through SriLankan Airlines and arrived in Sri Lanka on 6 December 2021.

A postmortem carried out by the Pakistani authorities indicated skull and jaw fractures as the cause of death. All his vital organs had been affected, while torture marks were visible all over his body. His spinal cord was broken in three locations. All his bones were broken other than in one foot. 99 per cent of his body was burned.

== Court case ==
On 12 March 2022, the Anti Terrorism Court (ATC) indicted 89 individuals including eighty adults and nine minors. All of the 89 individuals accused, pleaded not guilty.

On 18 April 2022, the ATC awarded death sentence to six convicts on two counts and a payment of Rs.200,000 as compensation to the deceased's legal heirs. While, the ATC awarded life imprisonment to nine convicts along with payment of Rs.200,000 as fine and Rs.200,000 as compensation to the legal heirs. Seventy-two others were sentenced to two years of rigorous imprisonment each on three counts and one year imprisonment each on two counts. One other convict was awarded jail sentence of five years. The ATC only acquitted one person in the case.

== Reactions ==
The incident was met with shock in Pakistan, with condemnations pouring in from political representatives, civil society groups and religious leaders.

Prime Minister of Pakistan Imran Khan expressed his disbelief and anger in a tweet saying "The horrific vigilante attack on a factory in Sialkot and the burning alive of a Sri Lankan manager is a day of shame for Pakistan. I am overseeing the investigations and let there be no mistakes, all those responsible will be punished with the full severity of the law. Arrests are being made".

Pakistan's Defence Minister Pervez Khattak, while reacting to the incident, provoked controversy when he said "murders take place when young people get emotional". Later, he issued a clarification stating he "vehemently condemned" the incident and that his earlier remarks were in response to a question whether the lynching was a consequence of the government allowing too much leeway to the TLP in the country as a result of a "deal".

On 4 December, both the Government of Sri Lanka and opposition parties condemned the incident and urged immediate action to punish the perpetrators. The Parliament of Sri Lanka urged the authorities in Pakistan to ensure the rights of the Sri Lankan expat workers in Pakistan be safeguarded. On 6 December, Kumara's remains were repatriated with state honours from Lahore to Colombo via a SriLankan Airlines flight.

Sri Lankan High Commissioner to Pakistan, Vice Admiral Mohan Wijewickrama assured that the incident would have no effect on relations between Sri Lanka and Pakistan, noting the close social, defensive and commercial ties between the two countries.

Following an appeal for compensation by Kumara's widow, Sri Lanka's Cabinet of Ministers approved a grant of Rs 2.5 million (US$12,322) to the family of Kumara to be paid from the Employees' Welfare Fund of the Bureau of Foreign Employment considering his contribution as a migrant worker.

In Islamabad, a condolence event was held at the Prime Minister's Office to honour Kumara. While addressing the occasion, Imran Khan announced a civil award for Malik Adnan, a colleague who tried to save Kumara's life from the mob, and reiterated that "as long as I am alive, I will not allow incidents like the Sialkot lynching to happen again". The business community of Sialkot raised USD $100,000 for Kumara's family, and also announced that his widow would continue to receive his monthly salary.

One Pakistani official expressed concern over what to do with those convicted in the killing in light of the popularity of murdering those accused of blasphemy, in that:

“Where will you keep the 70-plus people who have been convicted to two-year terms? In the same prison? If you do that, they will become a powerful bloc there. And if you put ten here and ten there, then you have influential smaller blocs in several places where they could radicalise other inmates". Upon their release, he went on, these individuals could be "hailed as heroes in the community”.
