= Nizam-e-Mustafa =

Islamist movement in 1970s Pakistan

The Nizam-e-Mustafa (Urdu: تحریک نظام مصطفی, lit. 'Movement of the System of the Prophet') was a populist, Islamist movement and a slogan which was started in Pakistan by the Jamat-e-Islami and the Pakistan National Alliance (PNA) in 1977, to overthrow the secular and socialist government of Zulfiqar Ali Bhutto and establish an Islamic system in Pakistan, inspired from the Sharia, the PNA, which had started this movement believed that the 1977 Elections of Pakistan had been rigged by Bhutto, and therefore, lacked any legitimacy. The movement took placed from March 7 to July 5, spanning roughly 120 days.

== History ==
The movement was started by an alliance of nine parties which also formed the Pakistan National Alliance. The supporters of this movement carried out large protests across the country, demanding that Bhutto step down, after which law enforcement agencies opened fire on the protestors, and Section 144 was declared across Pakistan, which allowed the state to ban the people from carrying much of their outdoor activities.

The political instability in Pakistan was followed by the 1977 Pakistani military coup by the Chief of Army Staff, Muhammad Zia-ul-Haq in 1977, as Zia-ul-Haq made calls for a political retribution, and announced the introduction of Islamisation reforms, the Nizam-e-Mustafa Movement soon lost its significance.

The movement ceased to exist after the PNA was dissolved in 1978 when the allied parties started to diverge on their agenda.

=== Downfall ===
As the PNA launched a national campaign, dubbed the Nizam-e-Mustafa, against the Bhutto Administration, violence ensued, after several months of demonstrations and street violence, Bhutto attempted to negotiate with the alliance, but he was not met with any positive response.

On 5 July 1977, Bhutto accused the United States of plotting a coup against him and indicated that this movement was fully funded by foreign powers. As a result, Bhutto tried to crush the power of this alliance, with the help of his agencies such as FSF and Rangers, which was also considered the cause of Bhutto's execution by hanging on 4 April 1979. In the 1977 Pakistani military coup staged by General Zia, Bhutto was removed from office with majority of his colleagues.

Following the declaration of martial law by Zia-ul-Haq, the conservatives and Islamist fronts split and decided to fully support General Zia in his Islamisation reforms, whereas the leftist members of the alliance decided to either oppose him, or stay neutral, and as Bhutto was imprisoned, the uneasy alliance started to quickly break, by 1978 it had completely dissolved.

== Alliance members of the PNA ==
The Alliance which started this movement consisted of nine parties, each of which had an agenda, ideology, political goal and background different from each other. Many of the parties are now known by different names and have largely gone into irrelevance in Pakistani politics, with the exception of a few. However, during the peak of the Nizam-e-Mustafa Movement, the alliance consisted of the following nine members:

1. TI Tehrik e Istaqlal
2. JIP Jamaat e Islami Pakistan
3. JUI Jamiat Ulema e Islam
4. JUP Jamiat Ulema e Pakistan
5. PML Pakistan Muslim League
6. NDP National Democratic Party
7. PDP Pakistan Democratic Party
8. KT Khaaksaar Tehrik
9. AKMC All Jammu and Kashmir Muslim Conference
