= Ahmad Raza Khan Kasuri =

20th-century Pakistani politician and lawyer

Sahibzada Ahmad Raza Khan Qasuri (born 1938) is a Pakistani politician and lawyer. He is the son of Ahmed Khan Kasuri who was assassinated in a car ambush in Lahore in November 1974.

== Early life and career ==
Ahmad Raza Khan Kasuri was born into the Kheshgi family of Kasur. He was educated at Central Model School, Lahore and the Government College, Lahore. After receiving a master's degree in law from the University of Cambridge, he became an attorney. When Zulfiqar Ali Bhutto quit the Ayub government in the aftermath of Indo-Pakistani War of 1965, Ahmad Raza Kasuri joined his party, Pakistan Peoples Party (PPP) at its launch in 1967 as his father Ahmed Khan Kasuri was a founder and major financier of the PPP. Due to his father's close relations with Bhutto, Kasuri was appointed as a member of the central working committee of PPP. He was elected to the National Assembly of Pakistan on a PPP ticket in the 1970 Pakistani general election from a Kasur constituency.

However, Kasuri, holding idealist views, soon became disillusioned with Bhutto's pragmatic approach to politics. Despite Bhutto's strong opposition to attending the National Assembly session summoned at Dhaka on 3 March 1971, Kasuri remained adamant.

== Assassination of Mohammad Ahmad Kasuri ==
Muhammad Ahmed Khan Kasuri was allegedly murdered on the orders of Prime Minister Zulfiqar Ali Bhutto in 1974, when the intended murder conspiracy target was his son Ahmad Raza Khan Kasuri who escaped unhurt in the gunmen's ambush.

Zulfiqar Ali Bhutto was later arrested and convicted in 1979 by the Lahore High Court. Not formally acquitted of this alleged murder, the case filed shortly after the military coup on 5 July 1977 by Ahmad Raza Khan Kasuri proved useful for the dictator Mohammed Zia ul Haq.

Ahmad Raza Khan Kasuri was driving with his father in the front seat when their vehicle came under gunfire in Shadman, Lahore. Despite the severe damage to the car, Kasuri managed to drive his injured father to United Christian Hospital in Gulberg, Lahore, Lahore. His father succumbed to his injuries that same night.

On 11 November 1974, Bhutto was awakened by a telephone call. Masood Mahmood, the director-general of Federal Security Force (FSF) was at the other end and told him that Mohammad Ahmad Kasuri had been killed as his son Ahmad Raza Kasuri drove him and the family after attending a wedding party in Shadman Colony, Lahore. It was past midnight when the car was ambushed from both sides.

Mohammad Ahmad Kasuri was next to his son Ahmad Raza in the car. After the attack, Ahmad Raza drove directly to United Christian Hospital, where his father was pronounced dead. Although the assailants were unseen, Ahmad Raza claimed that Zulfikar Ali Bhutto orchestrated the attack. The simple reason he mentioned was that he, Ahmad, was dead set against Bhutto's policies and although elected on a PPP ticket, he had become a member of the opposition party led by Asghar Khan. He was so critical of Bhutto's policies that he had not signed the 1973 Constitution.

While lodging the FIR (First information report) at the Ichhra police station in 1974, Kasuri recorded every detail of the tragic event, and when asked about the possible culprits behind the attack, Kasuri mentioned the name of Bhutto, despite the police official's opposition. Kasuri had a reason to suspect Bhutto. During his student life he was bold and outspoken and often argued with his teachers on one point or another. He argued that the ammunition used in the car ambush was only available to Bhutto's paramilitary organization. But the police closed the case as unsolvable back then.

Governor of Punjab, Pakistan, Ghulam Mustafa Khar was asked to keep Kasuri from drifting away but that did not work and Kasuri continued criticising Bhutto in the National Assembly of Pakistan. Finally Bhutto wrote to Khar and the Chief Minister of Punjab (Pakistan), Malik Meraj Khalid asking why Kasuri had not been ostracized. However, Bhutto underestimated the trouble Kasuri would create. Being a lawyer, Bhutto should have known the consequences of such an FIR; there is no understanding how he took it so lightly and continued work as usual. On the other hand, Ahmad Raza Kasuri appeared at the National Assembly session on 20 November 1974, nine days after his father's murder. He had brought a small bottle of fluid claiming that it was his father's blood and a blood-stained shirt and announced that the government's murderous attacks on the members of parliament would be exposed. He continued in this vein for quite some time and always spoke of bad governance and injustice.

== Recent political affiliations ==
As of 2016, Ahmad Raza Khan Kasuri is a leader of All Pakistan Muslim League headed by General Pervez Musharraf.
