= Jamal J. Elias =

Pakistani-American religious scholar

- Born: April 3, 1962 (age 64); Lahore, Pakistan
- Occupation: Author

Jamal J. Elias (born 1962) is a scholar and professor of Religious Studies who currently serves as the Special Advisor to the Provost of Aga Khan University. He has written and lectured widely on the Qur'an, Sufism, poetry and modern society.

== Career ==
Elias was born in Lahore, Pakistan, and attended Burn Hall School, St. Mary's Academy and Aitchison College. He received his BA in Religious Studies from Stanford University, his MA in Turkish Literature, and his PhD in Religious Studies (Islamic Studies) from Yale University in 1991. He has taught at a number of prestigious educational institutions in USA, including Yale University, the University of Pennsylvania, Amherst College, and Brown University, and he has lectured broadly in North and South America, Europe, North Africa and the Middle East, and Asia.

At The Aga Khan University, he researches and teaches on Muslim Civilizations, including Islam and Bioethics, and Media on the Muslim World.

Elias also serves regularly as a consultant on legal and social issues related to the status of Muslims in America. He has provided expert testimony on cases related to freedom of religion and expression, anti-Muslim bias, workers rights, immigration and asylum, and child custody. He was called on to write to the Administrative Review Boards held at the Guantanamo Bay detainment camps. The Boards were authorized to recommend whether Guantanamo captives should continue to be held in extrajudicial detention. One of the justifications offered for the continued detention of over three dozen of the Guantanamo captives was that they had participated in the activities of a Pakistani Islamic missionary group named Tablighi Jamaat. Elias wrote at the time that this was a peaceful group, and that, in particular, one of the tenets of the movement was that participation on a Tabligh mission was a valid substitute for participation in Jihad.

Elias is also a photographer who has held a number of solo and group exhibitions in the United States. He also researches Pakistani truck art; he has written widely on the subject.

In 2025, Elias authored a book on the history of the Mevlevi Sufi order founded by the famous mystic Rumi.

== Selected bibliography ==
- The Throne Carrier of God: The Life and Thought of 'Alā' ad-Dawla as-Simnānī. Albany: State University of New York Press, 1995.
- Death before Dying: The Sufi Poems of Sultan Bahu. Berkeley: University of California Press, 1998.
- Islam. Upper Saddle River, NJ: Prentice-Hall, 1999.
- On Wings of Diesel: Trucks, Identity, and Culture in Pakistan. Oxford: Oneworld Publications, 2011.
- Aisha's Cushion: Religious Art, Perception and Practice in Islam. Cambridge: Harvard University Press, 2012.
- Alef is for Allah: Childhood, Emotion, and Visual Culture in Islamic Societies. Berkeley: University of California Press, 2018.
- After Rumi: The Mevlevis and Their World: Cambridge: Harvard University Press, 2025.
