= Khadim Hussain Rizvi =

Pakistani Islamic scholar and preacher (1966–2020)

- خادم حسین رضوی
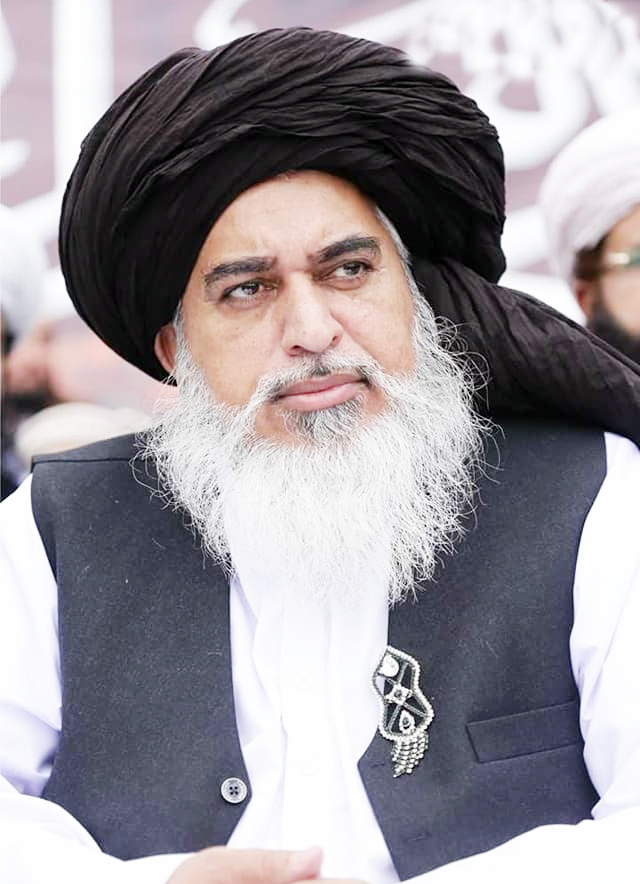

1st Ameer of Tehreek-e-Labbaik Pakistan
- In office 1 August 2015 – 19 November 2020
- Preceded by: Position established
- Succeeded by: Saad Hussain Rizvi

Personal life
- Born: 22 May 1966 Pindigheb, West Pakistan
- Died: 19 November 2020 (aged 54) Lahore, Punjab, Pakistan
- Children: 6, including Saad Hussain Rizvi
- Political party: Tehreek-e-Labbaik Pakistan
- Education: Jamia Nizamia Rizvia
- Occupation: Preacher, leader, Islamic scholar

Religious life
- Religion: Islam
- Denomination: Sunni
- Founder of: Tehreek-e-Labbaik Pakistan
- Jurisprudence: Hanafi
- Creed: Maturidi
- Movement: Barelvi

Khadim Hussain Rizvi (Urdu: خادم حسین رضوی; 22 May 1966 – 19 November 2020) was a Pakistani Islamic scholar and the founder and Amir of Tehreek-e-Labbaik Pakistan, a religiopolitical organization founded in 2015, known to protest against any change to Pakistan's blasphemy law.

Fluent in Urdu, Punjabi, Arabic and Persian, he was known for his speeches in the defense of the Islamic prophet, Muhammad, and apart from the Quran and hadith, for heavily quoting the poetry of Ahmad Raza Khan and Muhammad Iqbal, whom he considered to be his main influences.

== Early life ==
Khadim Hussain Rizvi was born in 1966, into a Punjabi Muslim Awan family in Pindi Gheb, Attock District, Punjab. His brother, Ameer Hussain, is a retired Junior Commissioned Officer (JCO) from Pakistan Army.

He started hafiz class in Jhelum. Further, he took admission in Jamia Nizamia Rizvia, Lahore. He was a Hafiz-e-Quran and Sheikh-ul-Hadith. He delivered Friday sermons at Lahore's Pir Makki Masjid while in the Punjab Auqaf and Religious Affairs Department. He was wheelchair user from 2007, ever since an accident near Talagang as the driver of his vehicle fell asleep while driving from Rawalpindi to Lahore.

In 2017, he founded a political party called Tehreek-e-Labbaik Pakistan (TLP), a political front for Tehreek Labbaik Ya Rasool Allah (TLYP). TLP came into existence after the hanging of Mumtaz Qadri, who assassinated Salmaan Taseer, the Governor of Punjab, for opposing the blasphemy laws and subsequently rose to fame. During the assassination of the Governor, Rizvi was serving as an auqaf official in the Punjab government. Rizvi had justified the assassination on the pretext that Taseer had termed the blasphemy law as a "black law". He was served warning notices to cease and desist from spreading his views in favour of blasphemy laws but his refusal to do so led to his removal from public service.

After his removal, Rizvi had more opportunity to preach his views. He travelled across the country to build support for Section 295-C of the Pakistan Penal Code, which deals with blasphemy committed against Islamic Prophet Muhammad. He also spoke out for the release of Mumtaz Qadri; his persistent advocacy earned him the nickname of "blasphemy activist" in religious circles.

== Controversies ==
=== 2017 Faizabad sit-in ===
On 6 November 2017, Rizvi organized a long march from Lahore to Islamabad to press for the resignation of the Law Minister Mr. Zahid Hamid who belongs to PML(N) regarding an alleged ill-motive change and favouring Ahmadis, in the "2017 Election of Pakistan" bill . Rizvi soon began receiving support from public, other religious political parties and other segments of society, making way for mushroom growth of protests nationwide. The general public took the same demand of resignation of the Law Minister to the streets. Thereafter, total shutdown began, and the government ultimately responded with a forced shutdown of all news channels, followed by blocking social media networks, to contain the situation and the flow of information. This created mayhem and confusion in the cities of Karachi, Rawalpindi, Islamabad, Lahore along with some others in Punjab. Finally, by late evening the army chief intervened and asked "both sides" to show restraint.

=== 2018 Asia Bibi protests ===
On 31 October 2018, after eight years of detention and conviction by all the lower courts, a Pakistani Christian woman, Asia Bibi, who was accused of blasphemy, was found innocent in a landmark Supreme Court verdict. The final judgment said that one of Bibi's accusers violated the Ashtiname of Muhammad, a "covenant made by Prophet Muhammad with Christians in the seventh century but still valid today". Justice Asif Saeed Khosa ruled that the two women who made accusations against Asia Bibi "had no regard for the truth" and that the claim that she blasphemed Muhammad in public was a "concoction incarnate". The Supreme Court of Pakistan's ruling cited "material contradictions and inconsistent statements of the witnesses" that "cast a shadow of doubt on the prosecution's version of facts."

This prompted the TLP, under the leadership of Rizvi to initiate demonstrations in Karachi, Lahore, Peshawar and Multan. Clashes with police were reported. A leader of TLP, Muhammad Afzal Qadri, said all three Supreme Court judges "deserve to be killed". The Red Zone in the capital, Islamabad, where the Supreme Court is located, was sealed off by the police. In public speeches, Rizvi demanded that Asia should be subjected to the punishment for blasphemy under Pakistan's penal code. He was quoted as saying, "Our sit-in will go on until the government accepts our demand" denying reports that the sit-in would soon be over. He would later be arrested on 23 November 2018 along with other TLP leaders and then subsequently released on bail in May 2019

=== Murder of professors ===
In March 2019, a third year student at Bahawalpur's Government Sadiq Egerton College, Khateeb Hussain, stabbed associate professor Khalid Hameed in a fatal encounter. Khateeb Hussain was in contact with Zafar Gillani, a lawyer and senior member of the TLP prior to the murder, and obtained approval for the act over WhatsApp. The supposed motive for the killing was blasphemous and insulting rhetoric towards Islam.

In 2018, Sareer Ahmed, the principal of Islamia College in Charsadda, was murdered by a 17-year-old student whom he had reprimanded for missing a number of classes. The student accused the professor of engaging in "blasphemy" for reprimanding him for skipping class to attend rallies held by the TLP.

Both students stated that they were inspired by Rizvi.

=== 2020 Zindagi Tamasha controversy ===
In 2020, Rizvi promoted protests on the release of the Pakistani film Zindagi Tamasha. He accused film-maker Sarmad Khoosat of blasphemy. The material he alleged to be blasphemous includes criticism of ulama and an alleged reference to bacha bazi. Pakistani author Mohammed Hanif, who had seen both the censored and uncensored versions of the film, denied that any criticism of ulama was contained in the movie.

== Death ==
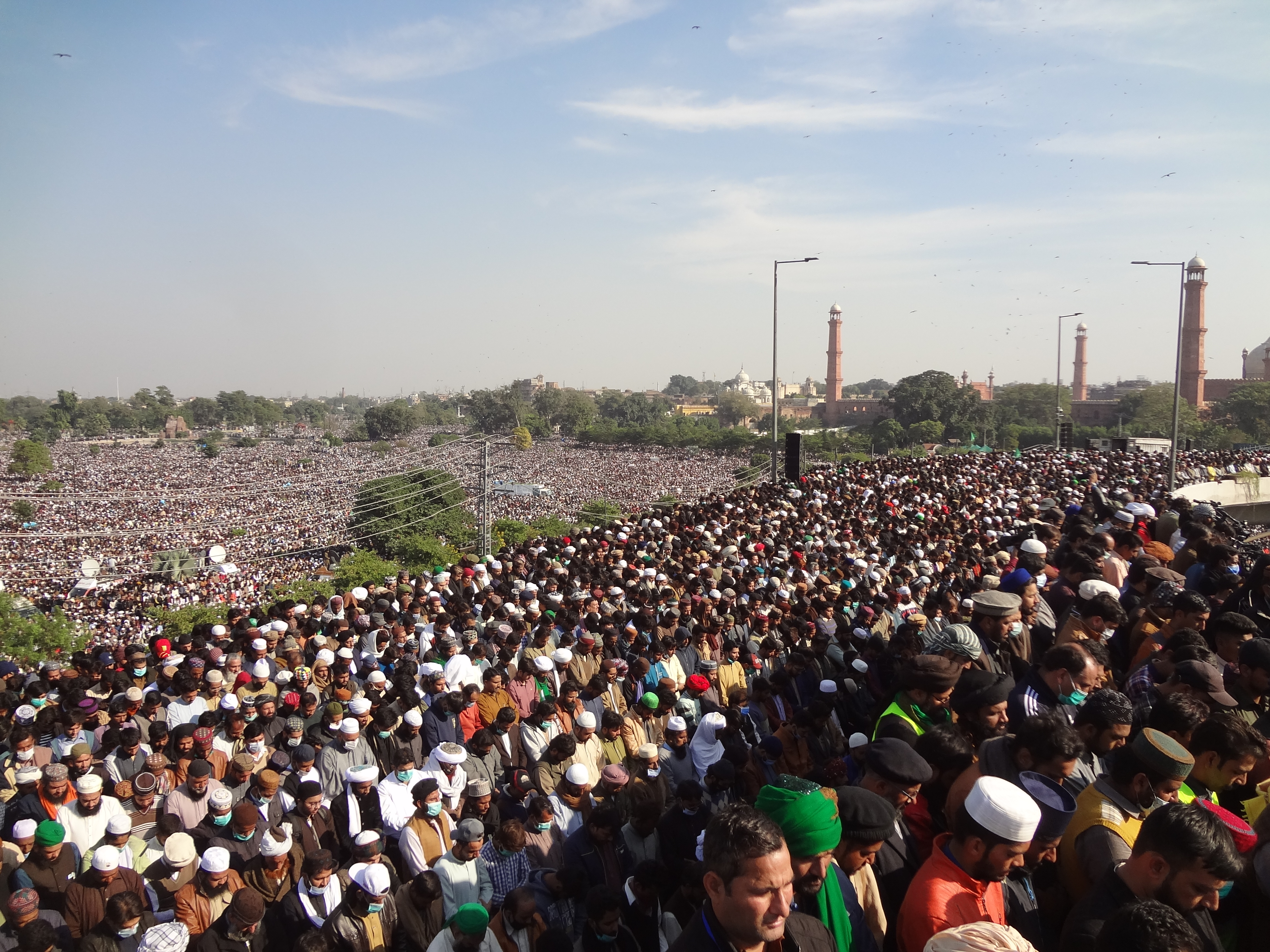
Funeral.

On 19 November 2020, Rizvi was taken to the Farooq Hospital in Allama Iqbal Town area of Lahore after collapsing. Upon reaching the hospital, he was pronounced dead on arrival. He was later taken to Shaikh Zayed Hospital, where he was declared dead at 8:48 pm. He had been ill for a few days and had been a wheelchair user for some time. Rizvi's son Saad Hussain Rizvi said that his father had started breathing again for five minutes after being declared dead, but stopped breathing again and finally died. The funeral prayers were held at the Minar-e-Pakistan in Lahore and were led by Saad. Rizvi was later buried inside Madrassah Abuzar Ghaffari, associated with Rehmatul Lil Alameen mosque.

A local official estimated that nearly 200,000 people attended the event. Rizvi was suffering from fever and breathing problems before his death, but no COVID-19 or autopsy tests were conducted. Saad was appointed as the new ameer of TLP on 21 November.

== Books ==
Some of the books he published include:

- Tayaseer Abwab-ul-Sarf (تیسر ابواب الصرف), Maktba Majadia Sultania, 2013, 680 p. On facilitating the learning of Arabic grammar.
- Taleemat-e-Khadimiya (تعلیمات خاد میۃ), Allama Fazal Haaq Publications, 2015, 677 p. On facilitating the learning of Arabic language.
- Fazail-e-Durood Shareef (فضائل درود شریف), Dajkot, 2018, 332 p. On the spiritual benefits of Durood, quoting scholars such as Abdul Qadir Gilani (1078–1166) and Ibn Qayyim al-Jawziyya (1292–1350).
