= 1977 Pakistani military coup =

Operation Fair Play
- Part of the Cold War and Military coups in Pakistan
- Type: Strategic and tactical
- Location: Prime Minister Secretariat, Islamabad
- Planned by: General Headquarters (GHQ)
- Objective: Relief of Prime minister Zulfikar Ali Bhutto from the Prime Minister Secretariat
- Date: 5 July 1977
- Executed by: 111th Brigade, X Corps
- Outcome: Success of coup d'etat led by General Zia-ul-Haq: Execution of elected prime minister Zulfikar Ali Bhutto.; Closer ties with United States; Growth of Islamism

The 1977 Pakistani military coup (codenamed Operation Fair Play) was the second military coup in the history of Pakistan. Taking place on 5 July 1977, it was carried out by Muhammad Zia-ul-Haq, the chief of army staff, overthrowing the government of Prime Minister Zulfikar Ali Bhutto.

The coup itself was bloodless, and was preceded by social unrest and political conflict between the ruling leftist Pakistan Peoples Party government of Bhutto, and the right-wing Islamist opposition Pakistan National Alliance which accused Bhutto of rigging the 1977 general elections. In announcing the coup, Zia promised "free and fair elections" within 90 days, but these were repeatedly postponed on the excuse of accountability and it was not until 1985 that "party-less" general elections were held. Zia himself stayed in power for 11 years until his death in a 1988 plane crash.

The coup was a watershed event in the Cold War and in the history of Pakistan. It took place nearly six years after the 1971 war with India which ended with the surrender of Pakistan and the secession of East Pakistan, which became Bangladesh. The period following the coup saw the "Islamisation of Pakistan" and Pakistan's involvement with the Afghan mujahideen (funded by the US and Saudi Arabia) during their war against the Soviet Union.

== Background ==
The Pakistan Peoples Party (PPP) came to power after the general elections held in 1970. The power was given to PPP after the devastating war with India which ended with the secession of East-Pakistan. Proponents of social democracy, left-wing philosophy, and socialist orientation were encouraged by the government and such ideas slowly entered in the ordinary lives of the people.

According to some authors and historians, some influential groups were not ready to accept the PPP's taking power in 1971. In 1972–74, the intelligence community had thwarted more than one attempt by the military officers to oust the civilian PPP government; all cases were heard by JAG legal branch of the Pakistan military. In 1976, Prime Minister Bhutto forcefully retired seven army generals to promote Lieutenant-General Muhammad Zia-ul-Haq to four-star rank and subsequent appointment as chief of army staff and General Muhammad Shariff as chairman joint chiefs. Reciprocating in the same period, General Zia invited Bhutto of becoming the first and only civilian Colonel Commandant of the Armoured Corps.

=== 1977 general elections and political crises ===
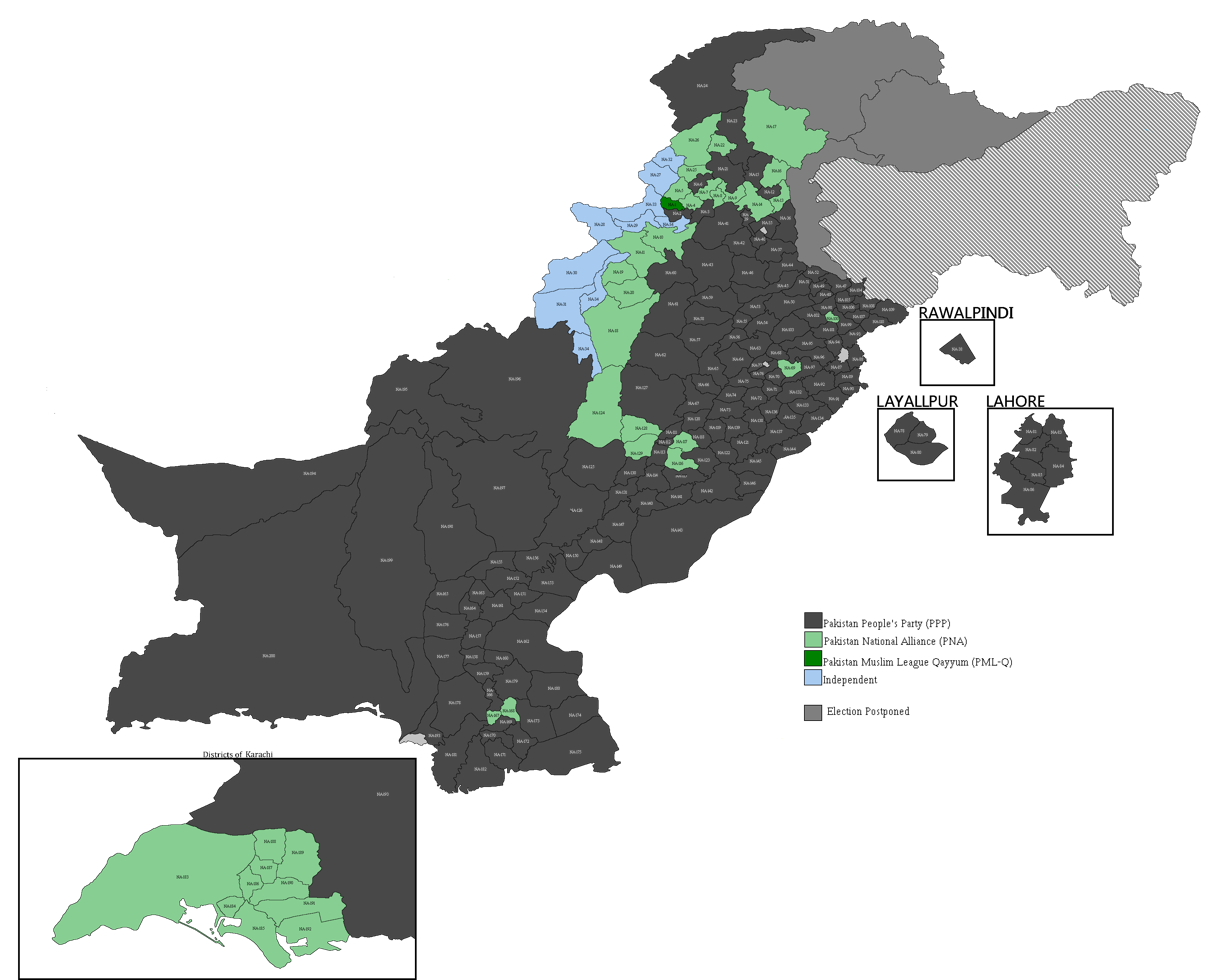
1977, General election in Pakistan map.

In 1976, nine religious and conservative parties formed a common platform, called the Pakistan National Alliance (PNA). In January 1977, Prime Minister Bhutto immediately started campaigning after called for new general elections. The PNA was united behind religious slogans and a right-wing political agenda. The PPP, on the other hand, campaigned on a platform of social justice in agriculture and industry. Despite large turnouts at PNA campaign events and the establishment on PNA's circle, the results of the general elections showed the Pakistan Peoples Party winning 155 out of 200 seats in the National Assembly and the PNA winning only 36. Bhutto therefore gained a supermajority in the Parliament.

The PNA leadership was astonished when the results were announced by the Election Commission (EC) and refused to accept the results and accused the Government of systematic rigging. According to "The Story of Pakistan," at many places, particularly where the PNA candidates were strong, the polling was alleged to have been blocked for hours. There were also reports that PPP armed personnel in police uniforms removed ballot boxes. Marked ballot papers were also found on the streets in Karachi and Lahore. Rumors quickly circulated that the results in key constituencies were issued directly from the Prime Minister's office. According to author Ian Talbot, "The reality seems to be that a certain PPP victory was inflated by malpractice committed by local officials, which may have affected 30–40 seats."

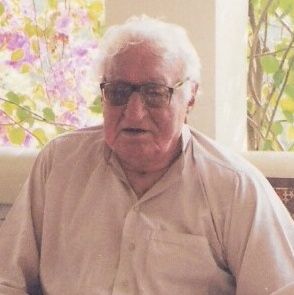
PNA leader, Abdul Wali Khan

The PNA immediately called for street boycott and demanded resignation of Prime Minister Bhutto. The PNA used mosques to agitate the masses and caused severe civil unrests. At least 200 people were killed in the clashes between security forces and demonstrators.

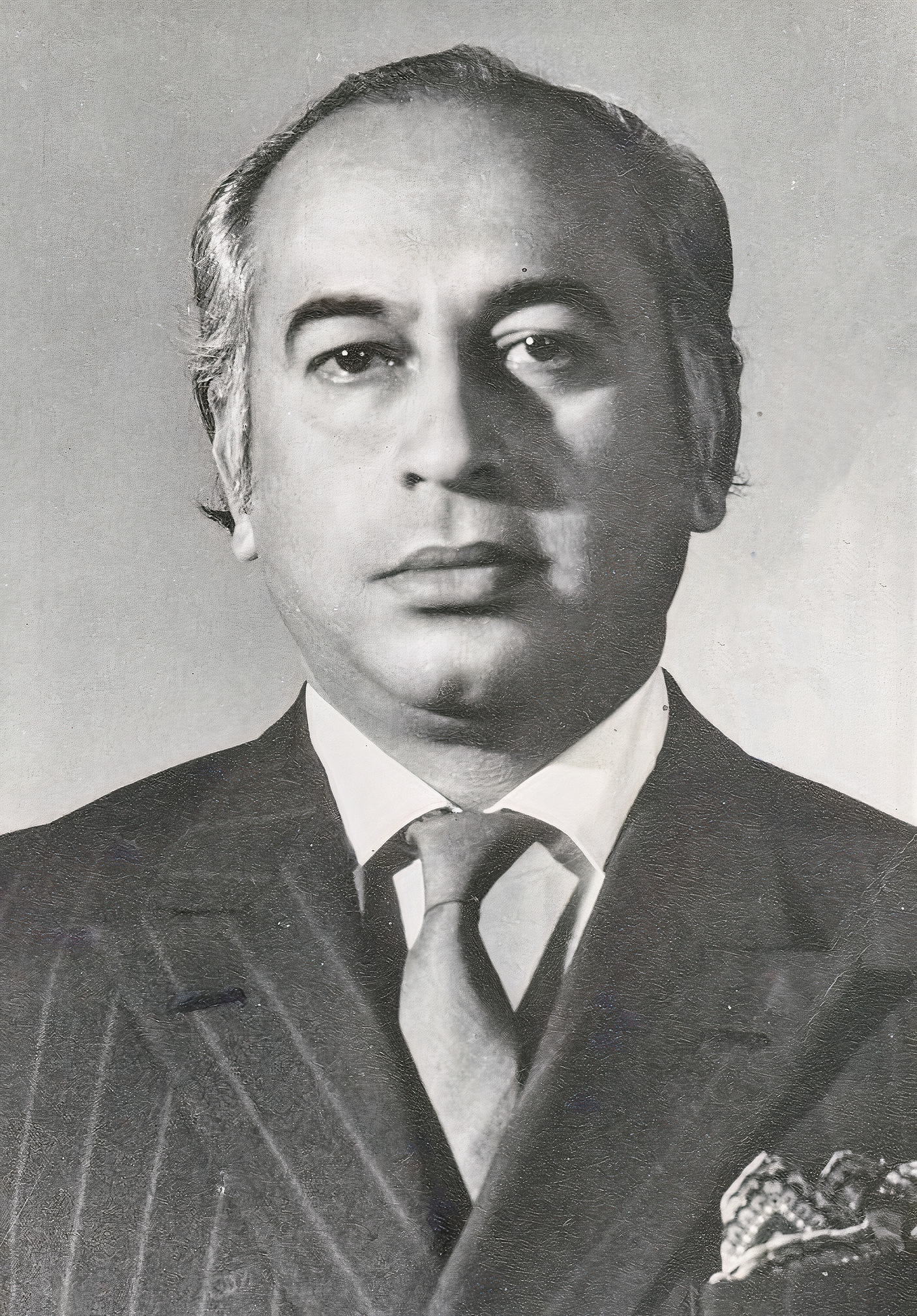
Prime Minister, Zulfiqar Ali Bhutto

Zia had already removed Bhutto Loyalists, and had put to military trial one of the biggest names in Pakistan Army history; General Tajammul Hussain Malik war hero 1965 & 1971 to show Bhutto his loyalty. This did, however decrease his support within the army and it is believed several factions of the army that sided with Gen. Tajammul later caused Gen Zia's death.

Bhutto responded with the use of Federal Security Force (FSF) and Police to control the situation as many activists of PNA were imprisoned. One leader of the PNA secretly wrote a letter to chiefs of staff of armed forces and chairman joint chiefs to intervene to end the crises; thus inviting armed forces to enforce martial law.

In 1977, one official of the Military Intelligence (MI) had persuaded Prime Minister Bhutto that martial law was imminent, and to speed up the negotiations with the PNA. The PPP realised the seriousness of the crises and political negotiations were started in June 1977. The PPP accepted almost all demands of the PNA and the stage was set for a compromise. The negotiations were stalled when Bhutto took the lengthy tour of Middle East countries and the PNA termed his tour as dilatory tactics. Furthermore, there was an impression created in the print media that negotiations were falling apart.

After the letter reached to the chiefs of staff of armed forces and chairman joint chiefs, there was a fury of meeting of inter-services to discuss the situation. When Bhutto returned to the country and in spite of the agreement was about to sign with the PNA. Zia-ul-haq ordered the coup to take over the country.

== Coup ==
Operation Fair Play was the code name for the military coup d'état conducted on 5 July 1977 by Zia-ul-Haq. The code name Fair Play was intended to portray the coup as the benign intervention of an impartial referee to uphold respect for the rules and ensure free and fair elections.

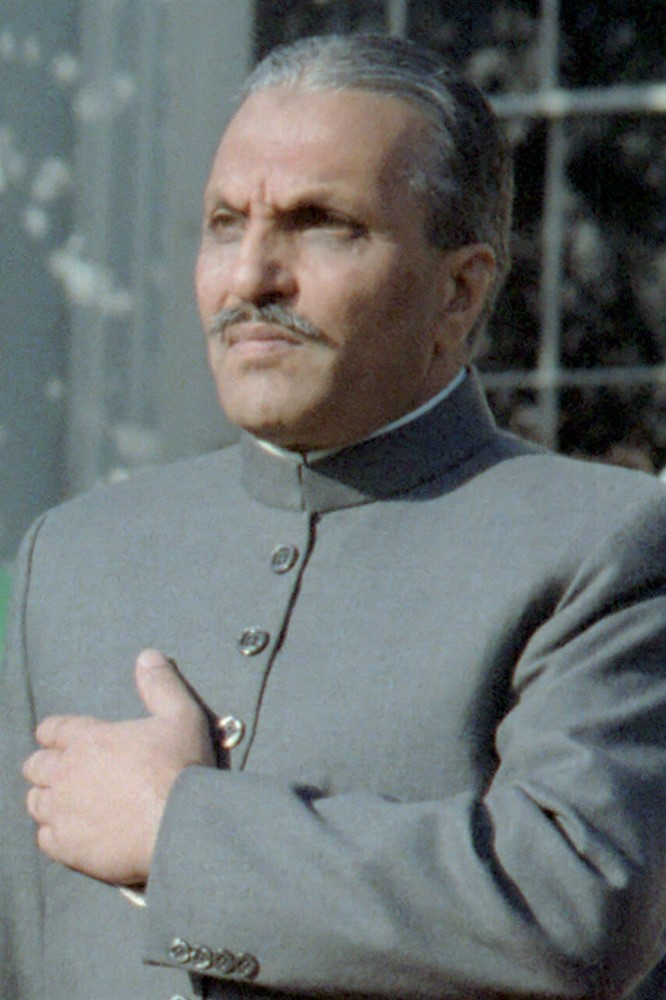
Zia-ul-Haq, the instigator of the Coup

In announcing the coup, Zia promised "free and fair elections" within 90 days. He arrested Bhutto and his ministers, as well as other leaders of both the PPP and the PNA. He dissolved the National Assembly of Pakistan and all provincial assemblies, suspended the Constitution, and imposed martial law. A four-member Military Council, made up of Zia-ul-Haq as Chief Martial Law Administrator, the Chairman of the Joint Chiefs of Staff Committee, and the Chiefs of the Navy and the Air Force, took over government operations in the country.

Bhutto and the PPP was persecuted on the charges of murder of political opponents.

=== Supreme Court ===
The Supreme Court and the Chief Justice of Pakistan Anwar-ul-Haq legitimatised the military response after issuing the Doctrine of necessity orders. On 24 October 1977, the Supreme Court began the trial against Bhutto on charges of "conspiracy to murder" Nawab Muhammad Ahmed Khan Kasuri.

In 1977, the Supreme Court found Bhutto guilty of murder charges and condemned him to death. Despite appeals of clemency sent by many nations, the government upheld the Supreme Court verdict and followed the Supreme Court orders when Bhutto was hanged in 1979.

== International reactions ==
International reactions to the coup were largely muted, and two of Pakistan's neighbors, India and China, did not issue any statements. Only two countries issued statements over this issue. The Soviet Union harshly criticised the coup and Leonid Brezhnev condemned Bhutto's execution out of "purely humane motives".

The US played an ambiguous role instead with many charging that the martial law was imposed with the willingness and "tacit" approval of the US and the CIA's involvement.

When allegations were leveled against the US by Pakistani historians and scholars, American officials reacted angrily and held Bhutto responsible for his act. Despite US denial, many authors, and the PPP's intellectuals themselves, held the US responsible and suspected the US of playing a "hidden noble role" behind the coup.

In 1998, Benazir Bhutto and the PPP publicly announced their belief in the electronic media that Zulfikar Bhutto was "sent to the gallows at the instance of the superpower for pursuing the nuclear capability [of Pakistan]."

== Aftermath ==
Before the third martial law in 1977, Pakistan had been under martial law for nearly 13 years and saw the wars with India which led to the secession of East Pakistan. It was marked by numerous human rights violations. A weak insurgent movement against Zia's government was maintained inside the country by elements sympathetic to the former Bhutto government, but was met with great hostility from the United States and Zia.

The martial regime ended in 1988 with the death of President Zia and many other key military administrators in the government in a plane crash. Following this event, the country returned to democracy and the PPP again came in power. In 1999, military rule was again imposed against Prime Minister Nawaz Sharif by the armed forces, resulting in General Pervez Musharraf coming to power for nine years.
