= Tehreek-e-Labbaik Pakistan =

Far-right Islamist political party in Pakistan

Tehreek-e-Labbaik Pakistan تحریکِ لبیک پاکستان
- Abbreviation: TLP
- Ameer: Saad Hussain Rizvi
- Naib Ameer: Syed Zaheer Ul Hasan Shah
- Founder: Khadim Hussain Rizvi
- Founded: 1 August 2015 (11 years ago); Nishtar Park, Karachi, Sindh
- Legalized: 7 November 2021
- Banned: 23 October 2025
- Headquarters: Lahore, Punjab, Pakistan
- Youth wing: Tehreek Youth Wing
- Ideology: Pan-Islamism; Populism; Islamic extremism; Barelvism; Islamism; Religious conservatism; Anti-Ahmadi; Anti-LGBT
- Political position: Far-right
- Religion: Islam
- Punjab Assembly: 1 / 371

Party flag
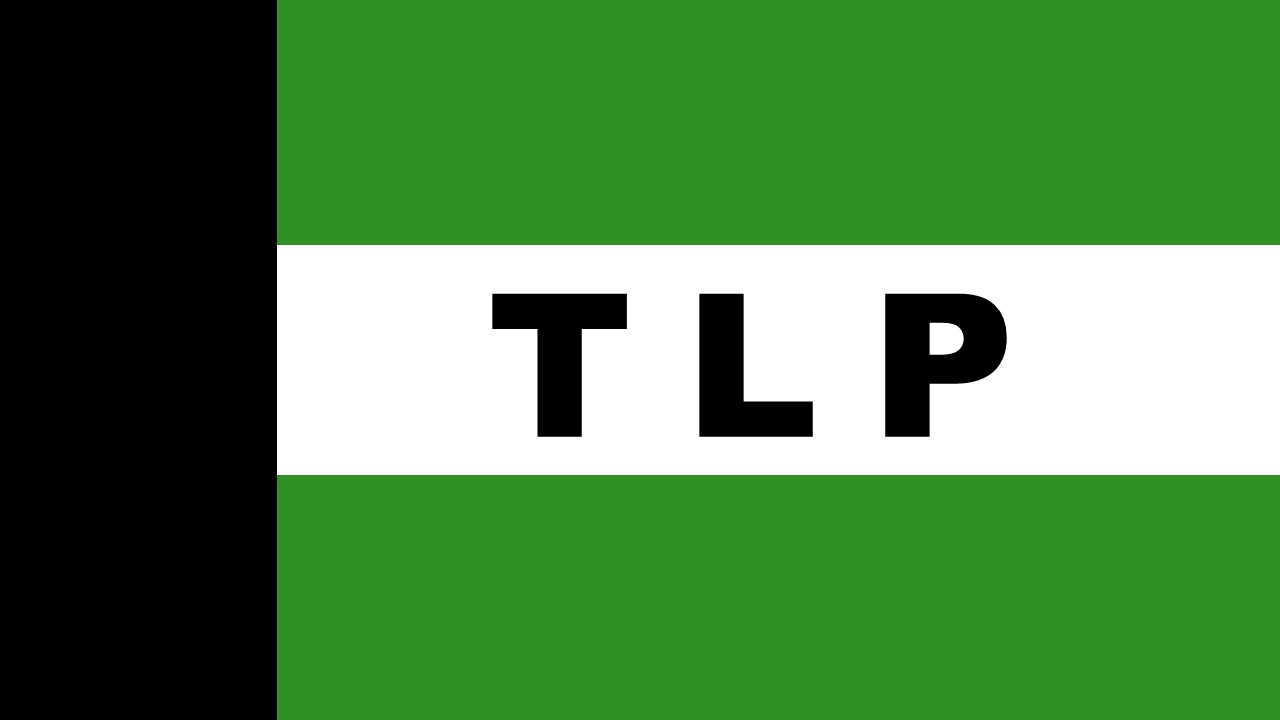

Website
- Official website

Tehreek-e-Labbaik Pakistan (Urdu: تحریکِ لبیک پاکستان, lit. '"Here-I-Am Movement of Pakistan"'; abbr. TLP) is a banned far-right Islamic extremist, populist political party in Pakistan. The party was founded by Khadim Hussain Rizvi in August 2015, who also became its first ameer. TLP is currently led by Saad Hussain Rizvi. TLP became the 4th largest party in Pakistan following the 2024 Pakistani general election, securing nearly 2.9 million votes. TLP also became the 3rd largest party in the province of Punjab, Pakistan after receiving nearly 2.5 million votes in the 2024 Punjab provincial election. TLP currently holds one seat (PP-55 Narowal-II) in the Provincial Assembly of the Punjab.

TLP is known for its protests against any changes to the blasphemy law in Pakistan. It demands that Sharia be established as the Islamic law in Pakistan, through a gradual legal and political process. However, the TLP has repeatedly resorted to violent protests used to coerce the government into agreeing to their demands.

Most of the party's members belong to the Barelvi movement, a revivalist movement within Sunni Islam. The party organized and led the 2021 Pakistani protests.

== Party profile ==
=== Ideology ===
TLP is a far-right Islamist populist party, its civilizational populism being centered around the concept of Nizam-e-Mustafa, the idea of establishing a hard-line Sharia-driven Islamic state, catering to the country's Sunni majority population in general and to the Barelvis in particular while targeting minorities such as the Ahmadiyya, criticizing the elite for abandoning Sharia and being overall critical of Western civilization with talking points against a supposed Jewish lobby as well as against leftist ideologies and secularism. TLP is considered fascist by some analysts because of its engagement in Islamic extremism and militant terrorism.

=== Support base ===
TLP finds its sympathizers mainly among the Sunnis of Barelvi affiliation, who make the majority of Pakistan's Muslim population, ranging from rural madrasa students to urban working professionals, such as in Karachi, where the city's leadership and members include lawyers, doctors, chartered accountants and bank managers.

In 2018, a Gallup Pakistan survey found out that 46% of TLP voters voted for PML-N during the 2013 Pakistani general election, few years before the foundation of TLP, while 11% of TLP voters used to vote for MQM and 7% for both PPP and PTI during the same period. Analysts thus note that PML-N has lost the most when it comes to its electoral base due to the rise of TLP, former PML-N voters citing Nawaz Sharif's recent stances on Kashmir and relations with India as the main reasons for their dissatisfaction.

=== Social media ===
TLP, through both its leadership and its members or sympathizers, has a large presence on social media, and as of 2019 it had at least 17,200 active Twitter users.

== Chronology of political agitation against the government ==
=== 2015 foundation ===
Tehreek-e-Labbaik was founded on 1 August 2015 by Khadim Hussain Rizvi, at the Nishtar Park in Karachi. Seventy-five founding members pledged allegiance to Khadim Hussain Rizvi. In 2017, The Tehreek-e-Labbaik allotted the crane as its election symbol.

=== 2017 Khatm e Nabuwwat Bill ===
In October 2017, the Pakistan Muslim League (Nawaz, or PML-N) government controversially changed the language in its 2017 elections bill. It amended a declaration where candidates for office were required to proclaimed their faith in the "absolute and unqualified finality of the Prophet Muhammad" (known as the "seal of the prophets" oath). by saying "I believe" (that he does), which replaced the words "I solemnly swear" (that the Prophet has that status). Labaik demanded that the government abandon the change and sack the law minister, claiming that the change weakened the affirmation and conceded ground to Ahmadis.

The TLP and its leader Khadim Hussain Rizvi strongly opposed the new language, and demanded the resignation of Pakistan's law minister Zahid Hamid, who had changed the law. It held a large protest against the amendment, stopping traffic at the Faizabad Interchange at first, which then led to further protests across the country. The party led a three-week sit-in protest that paralyzed the entire country including Pakistan's capital, Islamabad, activists attacked police and damaged property. At least six protesters were killed and 200 were injured when police unsuccessfully tried to disperse the sit-in, the protest spread nationwide, and the minister Zahid Hamid was forced to resign. The participants went home after the military guaranteed an agreement with them, "giving those responsible for inciting and using violence immunity from arrest; a major general even gave the protesters cash handouts."

=== 2018 assassination attempt of Ahsan Iqbal ===
In May 2018, Interior Minister and PML-N senior leader Ahsan Iqbal was shot and wounded at a political rally in his home constituency of Narowal, in an apparent assassination attempt. The attacker, later found to be linked with Tehreek-e-Labaik Pakistan, was arrested from the spot. TLP criticised the attack and called for a judicial inquiry, insisting that its methods were peaceful and democratic.

=== 2018 acquittal and release of Asia Bibi ===
Following the acquittal of Asia Bibi (formally, Asia Noreen), a Pakistani Christian who was charged with blasphemy and kept in solitary confinement for eight years until found innocent on 31 October 2018, TLP members held protests across Pakistan that included "blocking roads but not damaging the infrastructure". Muhammad Afzal Qadri, a TLP co-founder, also called for the death of the three Supreme Court justices involved in hearing Bibi's appeal, stating "The Chief Justice and two others deserve to be killed ... Either their security guards, their drivers, or their chefs should kill them." On 2 November 2018, the Government of Pakistan under the administration of Imran Khan and the Tehreek-e-Labbaik political party, which encouraged the protests against Asia Bibi, came into an agreement that barred Asia Bibi from leaving the country, in addition to releasing Tehreek-e-Labbaik protesters who were under arrest. The deal includes expediting a motion in the court to place Asia Noreen on Pakistan's no-fly list, known officially as the Exit Control List. Due to pressure from Tehreek-e-Labbaik, Pakistani authorities hadn't released Asia Noreen until the "Supreme Court makes a final review of its verdict" as "Ghulam Mustafa, the lawyer representing a provincial cleric in Punjab who had filed the initial blasphemy charges against Bibi, petitioned the Supreme Court requesting that the judges review her acquittal."

This agreement between the Government of Pakistan and TLP led to "allegations [that] the government was capitulating to extremists". Pakistani Information Minister Fawad Chaudhry responded to these allegations, saying "We had two options: either to use force, and when you use force people can be killed. That is not something a state should do... We tried negotiations and (in) negotiations you take something and you leave something." Asia Noreen's lawyer Saif-ul-Mulook called the agreement between the Government of Pakistan and the Islamists "painful", stating that "They cannot even implement an order of the country's highest court". Feeling that his life was threatened, Mulook fled to Europe in order "to stay alive as I still have to fight the legal battle for Asia Bibi." British Pakistani Christian Association chairman Wilson Chowdhry stated that "I am not surprised that Imran Khan's regime has caved in to extremists". Jemima Goldsmith, an ex-wife of Imran Khan, similarly "said that Pakistan's government caved in to extremist demands to bar Asia Bibi from leaving the country", opining "Not the Naya Pakistan we'd hoped for. 3 days after a defiant & brave speech defending the judiciary, Pakistan's gov caves in to extremist demands to bar Asia Bibi from leaving Pak, after she was acquitted of blasphemy- effectively signing her death warrant."

On 7 November 2018, Asia Bibi was released from New Jail for Women in Multan, flown to PAF Base Nur Khan, from whence she then departed the country on a charter plane, to the Netherlands. Shahbaz Attari of TLP, upon hearing the news, said that TLP members would gather in Islamabad and Rawalpindi to try and prevent the departure of Asia Bibi to the Netherlands.

=== 2018 arrest ===
On 23 November 2018, after approval of Federal Cabinet, provincial police carried out an operation and arrested the chief of TLP Khadim Hussain Rizvi, along with some 50 members of his party to defunct the TLP's call for a public rally in Liaqat National Bagh planned for November 25, 2018, following which protests spread out and situation deteriorated. Federal Minister for Information and Broadcasting Fawad Chaudhry confirmed the arrest as a protective custody. Along with media blackout, TLP faced social media and websites bans during the crackdown. The TLP leaders Khadim Hussain Rizvi, Pir Afzal Qadri, Inayat Haq Shah, Farooqul Hassan were booked on charges of sedition and terrorism.

=== 2021 protests ===
The arrest of TLP leader Saad Rizvi in mid-April 2021 for inciting violence led to demonstrations by his supporters and the deaths of at least four police constables, the abduction of eleven other police personnel and the reported torture of a police deputy superintendent in Lahore.

On 12 April 2021, Khadim Hussain Rizvi's son, Saad Hussain Rizvi was arrested by police while he was coming back from a funeral prayer prior to a planned protest by the party on 20 April 2021. The planned protest's motive was to pressure the Government of Pakistan to deport the French ambassador in Pakistan over the controversy of cartoons of the Islamic prophet Muhammad. Over the three day protest, the French embassy asked its citizens to temporarily leave the country. The government had arrested Rizvi in Lahore and charged him under Pakistan's Anti-Terrorism Act, 1997 (ATA), which further angered protesters, causing widespread unrest.

On 14 April 2021, the party was banned, which came after violent protests that caused the deaths of two policemen and left 340 injured, in retaliation to the arrest of the new ameer. The interior minister stated that the Punjab government had requested for the ban and the summary after being approved from the federal cabinet resulted in the ban on TLP under the Anti-Terrorism Act 1997. Tehreek-e-Labbaik was banned by the Government of Pakistan on April 15, 2021.

During protests on 18 April 2021 outside the TLP office in Saddar area of Lahore near Multan Road, a police team tried removing the members, leading to clashes and eleven police officers being injured. Protesters also attacked the police station in Nawan Kot, taking 12 policemen (in some reports said to be 11) as hostages and torturing them. They were released on the next day after talks with the Government of Punjab. The protesters also stole an oil tanker. Two of the protesters were killed and 50 were injured during the violence.

Attiq Ahmed, the public relations officer of Punjab Prisons said on 20 April that Saad Rizvi had been released. Lahore's Jail Superintendent Asad Warraich however said he didn't know of any such release and they had received no order to release him. Interior Minister Sheikh Rasheed Ahmad later confirmed that Rizvi had not been freed. He added that the government has freed 669 out of 733 people arrested in relation to the violent protests, 30 cars had been set on fire while five looted cars had been returned by protestors, and a National Assembly session had been called to decide on expulsion of the French ambassador.

TLP filed a review petition on 29 April addressed to the Interior Secretary, for the removal of the ban imposed on the party. A review board of the Lahore High Court rejected extending Saad's detention on 8 July, stating the government had no evidence to keep him in custody. His detention was however later extended by the government for 90 days under the Anti-Terrorism Act 1997.

Minister of Information and Broadcasting Fawad Chaudhry announced on 13 July that the Government of Pakistan had decided to keep the ban on TLP in place and it will ask the Election Commission of Pakistan (ECP) to cancel the party's election symbol. Despite the ban, the party was allowed to continue to take part in elections as it was not delisted by the ECP.

A review board of the Lahore High Court rejected extending Saad's detention on 8 July, stating the government had no evidence to keep him in custody. His detention was however later extended by the government for 90 days under the Anti-Terrorism Act 1997. A relative of Rizvi filed a petition before the Lahore High Court in September 2021, asking that the court declare the government's extension of his detention illegal and order his release.

TLP again held its protests in October 2021, following which the Government of Pakistan agreed to lift the ban on the party on 7 November and released Saad Rizvi on 18 November.

=== 2023 shutter-down strike ===
On 16 February 2023, the Government of Pakistan had raised the price of petrol in adherence to the wishes of the International Monetary Fund.

In response to the price hike and the ensuing inflation, TLP had called for what was known as the "shutter-down strike" on 27 February 2023.

The strike was nationwide and included a large convoy similar to that of the American and Canadian trucker convoys that had occurred no more than a year prior, the protesters also wore yellow construction vests, possibly in solidarity with the French Yellow Vests whose protest in 2018 had also been caused by a hike in fuel prices.

The TLP announced the strike with the intention of forcing the government into compliance with its wishes to decrease the price of petrol. Workers played a significant role in the protest and in some instances the protesters blocked the roads.

=== 2025 protests ===
In October 2025, TLP organized protests outside the US Embassy in Islamabad in solidarity with the Palestinians. 11 people were killed during the protests.

Inayatul Haq Shah, a key party figure, along with his family members have been accused of using 1,800 different accounts to finance the banned party during the protests. Shah and accomplices had withdrawn PKR 13.4 million in cash from a madrassa's account on 13 and 14 October 2025 when the TLP had taken out a violent march.

== Other controversies ==
=== Political pressure ===
TLP has notably held protests against actions by the government deemed unjust and against the teachings of Islam. In 2018, world renowned Princeton economist, Atif Mian was initially chosen as a member of an Economic Advisory Council formed by Pakistani Prime Minister Imran Khan to provide assistance on issues of economics and finance. Since his appointment, the government faced criticism from groups opposed to government representation for religious minorities, prominently by the TLP under the guidance of Rizvi. because of Atif's affiliation with the Ahmadiyya faith. He was removed from the Economic Advisory Council on 7 September 2018 and afterwards council members Asim Ijaz Khwaja and Imran Rasul resigned in protest.

=== Extrajudicial killings ===
In 2018, Sareer Ahmed, the principal of Islamia College in Charsadda, was murdered by a 17-year-old student who he had reprimanded for missing a number of classes. According to reports circulating on media channels, the student accused the professor of engaging in "blasphemy" for reprimanding him for skipping class to attend rallies held by the TLP.

In March 2019, a third year student at Government Sadiq Egerton College Bahawalpur, Khateeb Hussain, stabbed associate professor Khalid Hameed to death. Khateeb Hussain was in contact with Zafar Gillani, a lawyer and senior member of the TLP prior to the murder, and obtained approval for the act over WhatsApp. The supposed motive for the killing was blasphemous and insulting rhetoric towards Islam.

=== Support for blasphemy-related attacks outside Pakistan ===
In 2018, when the Dutch politician Geert Wilders announced that he was planning to hold a contest to draw caricatures of Muhammad, there were large protests in Pakistan against it.

It was in this context that TLP leader Khadim Hussain Rizvi declared in front of media that he would order nuclear bomb strikes on the Netherlands to destroy the entire country and "wipe them off the map" he was given the chance to or if he became Pakistan's leader. He is quoted to have said at a press conference in Karachi "If they give me the atom bomb I would remove Holland from the face of the earth before they can hold a competition of caricatures… I will wipe them off the face of this earth." Eventually Geert Wilders had no choice but to cancel his proposed cartoon contest due to fears of security risks and threats.

In late October 2020, just after the killing of French schoolteacher Samuel Paty in a suburb of Paris by an 18-year old Chechen refugee, TLP published an article on their official website where they commended the killing, labelling the killer as a "Shaheed" and "Mujahid" as well as posting a photo of the bloodied severed head of Samuel Paty in the same article on which the killer initially posted to Twitter just after the killing. The post was deleted by Twitter soon afterwards.

=== Involvement in Jaranwala church arsons 2023 ===
In the Jaranwala church arsons, on 16 August 2023, twenty-one Christian churches were burnt down by acts of arson, and homes belonging to Christian families were looted and destroyed by radical Muslim rioters; Bible desecration was committed as well. These acts were done by radical Muslim rioters in response to alleged Quran desecration. Over 100 criminals were arrested for the church arsons, including members of Tehreek-e-Labbaik Pakistan.

== Electoral history ==
=== National Assembly elections ===
Election	Leader	Votes	%	Seats
2018	Khadim Hussain Rizvi	2,234,316	4.2%	0 / 342
2024	Saad Hussain Rizvi	2,888,619	4.88%	0 / 342

=== Punjab Assembly elections ===
Election	Leader	Votes	%	Seats
2018	Khadim Hussain Rizvi	1,888,240	5.7%	0 / 371
2024	Saad Hussain Rizvi	2,449,844	6.84	1/371

=== Sindh Assembly elections ===
Election	Leader	Votes	%	Seats	+/–	Result
2018	Khadim Hussain Rizvi	414,701	4.83%	3 / 168	▲3	Opposition
2024	Saad Hussain Rizvi	329,715	2.91%	0 / 168	▼3	Opposition

=== Balochistan Assembly elections ===
Election	Leader	Votes	%	Seats
2024	Saad Hussain Rizvi	19,403	0.85%	0 / 65

=== Khyber Pakhtunkhwa Assembly elections ===
Election	Leader	Votes	%	Seats
2024	Saad Hussain Rizvi	81,824	0.98%	0 / 145

== List of Ameers ==
List of Ameers of Tehreek-e-Labbaik
Order	Image	Ameers	Year	Rationale
1		Khadim Hussain Rizvi	1 August 2015 – 19 November 2020	First term
2		Saad Hussain Rizvi	19 November 2020 – present	First term

== Bibliography ==
- Gautam, Pradeep Singh (3 September 2022). "Sufi-Barelvis, Blasphemy and Radicalization: A Critical Analysis". Strategic Analysis. 46 (5): 459–472. doi:10.1080/09700161.2022.2115237. ISSN 0970-0161.
- Basit, Abdul (2 July 2020). "Barelvi Political Activism and Religious Mobilization in Pakistan: The Case of Tehreek-e-Labaik Pakistan (TLP)". Politics, Religion & Ideology. 21 (3): 374–389. doi:10.1080/21567689.2020.1812395. ISSN 2156-7689.
