= October 2021 Tehreek-e-Labbaik Pakistan protests =

Series of protests in Pakistan

- Date: 22 October – 18 November
- Location: Mainly in cities of Punjab for example: Lahore, Multan, Gujrat, Gujranwala.
- Caused by: The arrest of TLP emir Saad Hussain Rizvi and demands to deport the French ambassador.
- Goals: Lift the ban on Tehreek-e-Labbaik Pakistan; Release of Saad Hussain Rizvi; Deportation of the French ambassador
- Methods: Protesters: Sit-in; Demonstrations; Stone pelting; Government and its supporters: Traffic blockage in Punjab and Islamabad; Lathi charge; Police raid on TLP activists and workers houses; Mass arrest; Internet shutdown
- Result: On 7 November 2021, Government of Pakistan lifted ban on TLP's prosribed status and rehabilitated its status back.; Protests end after the TLP leader Saad Hussain Rizvi released from prison on 18 November

Parties
Tehreek-e-Labbaik Pakistan	Government of Pakistan: Pakistan Police; Pakistan Rangers; Federal Investigation Agency

Lead figures
Saad Hussain Rizvi; Mufti Wazir Ali	Imran Khan (Prime Minister); Sheikh Rasheed Ahmad (Interior Minister); Noor-ul-Haq Qadri (Religious Affairs Minister)

Casualties and losses
20 protestors killed; 250+ arrested; Hundreds of protestors wounded	7 policemen killed; 50+ wounded

The October 2021 Tehreek-e-Labbaik Pakistan protests were started after the arrest of the extremist Tehreek-e-Labbaik Pakistan (TLP) emir Saad Hussain Rizvi, with demands to deport the French ambassador. TLP staged a sit-in on Multan Road in Lahore. After the deadline for the release of its leader Saad Hussain Rizvi expired they announced a march towards Islamabad.

== Background ==
Tehreek-e-Labbaik worker chief Saad Hussain Rizvi was detained under the Terrorism Act 1997 on 12 April 2021 after his party staged a protest against the Prophet's honor, during which in addition to vandalism, police Officers were also killed, for which they were named in 13 different cases. Saad Rizvi has been lodged in Kot Lakhpat Jail for six months. His uncle Amir Hussain Rizvi had filed a petition with the Lahore High Court against his detention.

Following the completion of the hearing on the case, the Supreme Court on 1 October 2021 ordered the release of Saad Hussain Rizvi. But on 26 September a letter from the Deputy Commissioner Lahore, the Federal Review Board had extended the detention of Saad Hussain Rizvi by one month on 2 October.

This notification was challenged by the TLP in the Federal Review Board, which took a stand on how to extend the order which the court has constitutionally annulled? While DC Lahore did not inform the Federal Review Board after writing the letter that after the letter of extension of his detention, the court declared the detention null and void.

On 9 October, the Federal Review Board reviewed the request in a video link meeting and ordered the release of Saad Rizvi, after which DC Lahore also issued a notification for the release of Saad Hussain Rizvi.

The notification said, "Saad Rizvi's detention has been declared null and void by the Lahore High Court and his immediate release is ordered." After that, there is no legal impediment to Saad Rizvi's release.

However, the release of Saad Rizvi did not materialize, prompting Tehreek-e-Labaik to hold a sit-in on Multan Road in Lahore on 20 October and ask the government to set a deadline of 5 pm 21 October for the release of its chief.

== Reactions ==
The Prime Minister Imran Khan immediately recalled Interior Minister Sheikh Rashid Ahmad. He had gone to UAE to watch the Pak-India cricket match from where he returned country to deal with law and order in country cause of TLP Protests.

On the directive of the Prime Minister, Interior Minister Sheikh Rashid Ahmad and Religious Affairs Minister Noor-ul-Haq Qadri have reached Lahore to resolve the issues.
