= Federal Security Force (Pakistan) =

Former Pakistani secret police agency (1972–77)

Federal Security Force (FSF)
- فیڈرل سیکیورٹی فورس (ایف ایس ایف)
- State Emblem of Pakistan

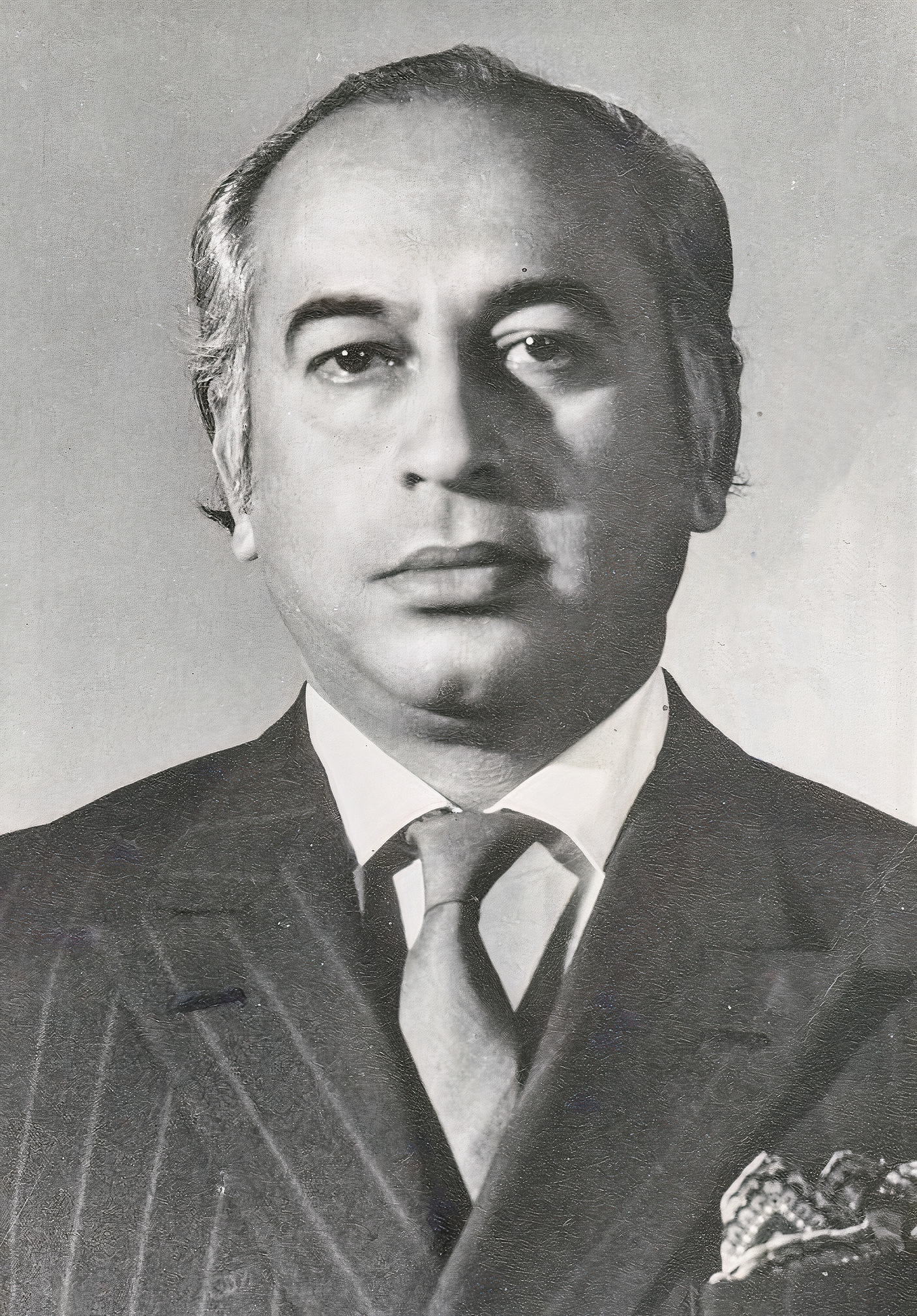
- Zulfikar Ali Bhutto

Agency overview
- Formed: 1972
- Dissolved: 1977
- Superseding agency: Dissolved
- Jurisdiction: Islamic Republic of Pakistan
- Status: Dissolved
- Employees: 15000
- Agency executives: Haq Nawaz Tiwana, (1st); Masood Mahmood, (2nd)
- Parent department: Government of Pakistan (Zulfiqar Ali Bhutto - PPP)
- Key document: https://na.gov.pk/uploads/documents/1487051693_848.pdf

The Federal Security Force (FSF) was a paramilitary and secret police force in Pakistan from 1972 to 1977. The FSF was established by then-President Zulfikar Ali Bhutto as a task force of the Government of Pakistan as a substitute for the use of the Pakistan Armed Forces in civilian affairs. It was mainly to serve as protection for civil leadership such as the Prime Minister and Leader of the Opposition, and assisting the government and police in maintaining law and order. The FSF was disbanded by military dictator Muhammad Zia-ul-Haq after Bhutto was overthrown in the 1977 Pakistani military coup.

== History ==
The Federal Security Force was established in 1972 by Zulfiqar Ali Bhutto, the President of Pakistan at the time, as a paramilitary force under the direct control of the Government of Pakistan. Its formation was a response to a police strike in March 1972, which raised concerns about the reliability of existing law enforcement institutions and the potential for increased civil unrest. The FSF also served as a civilian armed force to balance with the Pakistan Armed Forces, which was deeply involved in the politics of Pakistan and had ruled the country from 1958 to 1971.

At its peak, the FSF comprised over 15,000 personnel. Its primary responsibilities included assisting the police in maintaining order, securing political events, surveilling political opponents and, in some instances, using violence to suppress opposition. The FSF also engaged in intelligence collection aimed at countering opposition parties and identifying potential threats.

Haq Nawaz Tiwana was the FSF's first director general, later replaced by Masood Mahmood, a former British Indian Police Service officer and a Lincoln's Inn law graduate. Mahmood's tenure saw a close collaboration with Bhutto, but shifted allegiance to Zia-ul-Haq following the reopening of the Nawab Muhammad Ahmed Khan Kasuri murder case and he testified against Bhutto, contributing to his execution.

The necessity and motives behind the FSF's establishment have been subjects of debate. Critics argue that its creation was driven by Bhutto's desire to suppress opposition and instill fear among political adversaries. The FSF was implicated in several violent incidents, including the killing of Nazir Ahmad, a Jamaat-i-Islami leader, and the Liaquat Bagh shooting in 1973, which resulted in numerous casualties.

The FSF's legitimacy as a coup-prevention unit came under scrutiny, and its operations increasingly attracted public criticism. The FSF was officially disbanded in July 1977 by Zia-ul Haq administration. After its disestablishment in 1977, cases were opened against FSF officials Mian Abbas, Arshad Iqbal, Ghulam Mustafa, and Rana Iftikhar and were later sentenced to death for extrajudicial killings.
