= Ahmed Khan Kasuri =

Pakistani man (1903–1974)

Muhammad Ahmed Khan Kasuri (1903–1974) was a Pakistani magistrate. He belonged to Kheshgi Pashtun Tribe of Kasur. He was assassinated on 11 November 1974, in a car ambush likely aimed at targeting his son Ahmad Raza Khan Kasuri, a critic of the country's Prime Minister Zulfikar Ali Bhutto. The son who was driving the ambushed car escaped unhurt. The attack was allegedly carried out on the orders of Bhutto.

He was the magistrate who signed and witnessed the hanging of Bhagat Singh. No magistrate in India wanted to witness Singh's hanging. The British asked Kasuri to sign Singh's hanging and witness it as magistrate, as according to British law, a magistrate is needed to witness hanging of a convict. The place where Kasuri was assassinated in Lahore is reportedly the same place where in British time the jail was situated where Bhagat Singh was hanged.

Zulfikar Ali Bhutto was later arrested and convicted in 1978 by the Lahore High Court and was hanged in 1979.

On 6 March 2024, a 9-member bench, headed by Chief Justice of Pakistan, Qazi Faiz Isa, the Supreme court of Pakistan, in response to a presidential reference provided an opinion that Zulfikar Ali Bhutto was not provided a fair trial as mentioned in Articles 4 and 9 of the Constitution of Pakistan.
