= Pakistan Health Research Council =

Pakistani research agency

Pakistan Medical Research Council
- ہیئتِ پاکستان برائے تحقیقاتِ صحت
- Abbreviation: PMRC
- Formation: 1962; 64 years ago
- Founder: Wajid Ali Khan Burki
- Headquarters: Islamabad
- Region served: Pakistan
- Executive Director: Dr. Syed Atta ur Rehman
- Website: http://pmrc.org.pk

Pakistan Medical Research Council (PMRC), (Urdu: ہیئتِ پاکستان برائے تحقیقاتِ صحت) formerly known as the Pakistan Health Research Council (PHRC) is an autonomous research agency of Government of Pakistan under the Ministry of National Health Services, Regulation and Coordination in the field of medical and health sciences . It was established in 1962.

== Management of the Council ==
The Council is administered by a Board of Governors whose members include:-

- President of the Council;
- Surgeon General of the Pakistan Army;
- Executive Director of the National Institute of Health;
- the Secretaries of the Health Departments of the respective Provinces and Territories;
- Chairperson of the Pakistan Science Foundation; and
- Executive Director of the Council

The current Executive Director of the Council is Dr. Syed Atta ur Rehman
