= Pakistan Antarctic Programme =

Pakistani government initiative

The Pakistan Antarctic Programme (Urdu: پاکستان پروگرام برائے قطبِ جنوبی), abbreviated as PAP) is a scientific administrative division of the Ministry of Science and Technology (MoST) which represents the Government of Pakistan on the continent of Antarctica. The program coordinates scientific research and operational support in the region. The program is funded by the Pakistan Science Foundation and the Ministry of Science and Technology.

Currently, the PAP maintains and controls two polar stations in the region: the Jinnah Antarctic Station (JNS), and the Polar Research Cell (PRC), which was established by the National Institute of Oceanography (NIO) to co-ordinate all Antarctic related activities.

== History ==
The Antarctic Programme was launched by the National Institute of Oceanography (NIO).

Pakistan's second Antarctic expedition happened in 1992 and 1993. This expedition visited the 1991 station (Jinnah I), and then went on to establish a new field station at a second location (Jinnah II). This expedition also established an unmanned automatic Weather Station at a third location (the Iqbal Observatory).

A number of national organisations are involved in Antarctic activities and are active participants in the Pakistan Antarctic Programme.

In October 2010, a source with the NIO stated that Pakistan is developing a full-fledged permanent base in Antarctica, which will allow researchers to carry out year-round operations. In October 2020, the Director General of the NIO stated that although she was keen to see Pakistani researchers return to Antarctica, she considered it more feasible for them to join multinational Antarctic expeditions, as independent missions were regarded as too expensive.

== Objectives ==
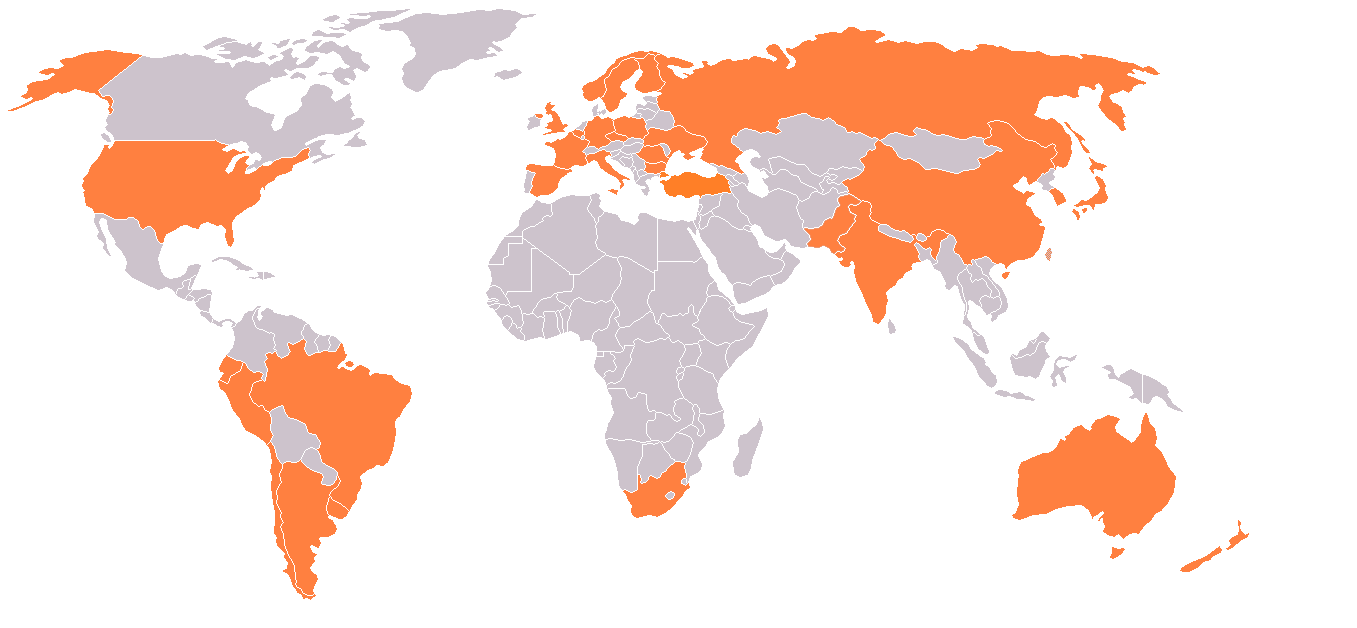
Nations of the world that have stations on the continent of Antarctica as of 2016.

The main objectives of the Pakistan Antarctic Programme are to undertake multidisciplinary research and survey the Antarctic region, with particular attention to geology and geophysics. Studies also include environmental and oceanographic research.

Pakistan's research activities are in conformity with the tenets of the Scientific Committee on Antarctic Research (SCAR), of which Pakistan is an associate member. Pakistanis have gained experience and capability by launching two major expeditions, thus strengthening Pakistan's ability to conduct research in the harsh Antarctic environment. Apart from this, useful environmental and oceanographic data has been collected in the region, and relevant technical information on Antarctic affairs has been provided to the Pakistani government.

== Stations ==
Pakistan maintains two summer research stations and one weather observatory in the vicinity of the Sør Rondane Mountains, Queen Maud Land, in Eastern Antarctica. The Jinnah Antarctic Station is the centre of most operations, and travel to and from Antarctica is done through the airfield at the JAS.

The NIO expressed interest in establishing a perennial Antarctic station in October 2010, but as of March 2023 the plans have not been realised.
