= PMNH =

PMNH may refer to:

- Pakistan Museum of Natural History, Islamabad, Pakistan
- Peabody Museum of Natural History, Yale University, Connecticut, USA
- Palestine Museum of Natural History, Bethlehem University, Bethlehem, Palestine
