= CMPL =

CMPL may refer to:

- Clementi Public Library, a public library in Clementi, Singapore
- Clinton-Macomb Public Library, Clinton Charter Township, Michigan
- "c-mpl", the human homologue of the myeloproliferative leukemia virus oncogene
  - Thrombopoietin, also known as "C-Mpl", the protein corresponding to the above
- The Central Military Pathological Laboratory, now known as AFIP Rawalpindi
- The cmpl instruction in the x86-64 instruction set
