= Jinnah Antarctic Station =

Pakistani research station in East Antarctica

Jinnah Antarctica Station جناح جنوبی قطب اسٹیشن
- Antarctic research station
- Location within Antarctica
- Coordinates: 70°24′S 25°45′E
- Country: Pakistan
- Location in Antarctica: Sør Rondane Mountains, Queen Maud Land (claimed by Norway)
- Administration: Pakistan Antarctic Programme (via National Institute of Oceanography)
- Established: 25 January 1991 (35 years, 10 months ago)
- Named for: Muhammad Ali Jinnah
- Time zone: UTC+3:00 (SYOT)
- Type: Seasonal
- Period: Summer
- Status: Active
- Activities: Oceanography
- Website: National Institute of Oceanography

The Jinnah Antarctic Station is an Antarctic research station operated by the Pakistan Antarctic Programme. Located in East Antarctica, it lies in the vicinity of the Sør Rondane Mountains in Queen Maud Land, and is named after Muhammad Ali Jinnah, the founder and first Governor-General of Pakistan.

== History ==
In 1991, shortly after Pakistan became a member of the Scientific Committee on Antarctic Research, the Pakistan Antarctic Programme was launched by the National Institute of Oceanography under the Ministry of Science and Technology. It was led by the Pakistan Navy, which provided logistical support for the research effort as well as for the establishment of the Jinnah Antarctic Station. The first expedition landed on 15 January, before they formally established the summer research station (Jinnah I) on 25 January 1991.

The station was used by the second Pakistani Antarctic expedition in 1992–1993, when they established a new field station, Jinnah II, at 70°50′S 25°10′E. During this expedition they also established a new automatic weather station, the Iqbal Weather Observatory, 125 kilometers south of the station at 71°27′36″S 25°17′24″E.

Pakistan currently maintains this as its one summertime research station and the Iqbal Observatory in Queen Maud Land, a Norwegian-claimed Antarctic territory.

== Facilities ==
The facilities were quickly expanded by the National Institute of Oceanography. Government advisors belonging to the Ministry of Science and Technology frequently visited the area. Pakistani naval engineers and scientists oversaw the development of the base. In 2001, the data operational system was linked to the Badr-B satellite, beginning regular transmission of digital imagery of the region to NIO headquarters in Karachi. In 2002, SUPARCO scientists visited the base, where they set up and installed an advanced, supercomputer-equipped facility, run by the NIO and SUPARCO's scientists. In 2005, Pakistan Air Force engineers and scientists built a small airstrip, and a control room to monitor flights to and from Pakistan. In 2010, Pakistan's government approved a plan to expand the JAS facility into a permanent operational base.

== See also ==
- List of Antarctic research stations
- List of Antarctic field camps
