= Pakistan Scientific and Technological Information Centre =

National repository in Pakistan

- Urdu: مرکز اطلاعات علمی و فناوری پاکستان
- Official patch of the PASTIC
- Abbreviation: PASTIC
- Established: 1974; 52 years ago
- Founder: Government of Pakistan
- Founded at: Islamabad, Pakistan
- Type: Governmental
- Legal status: Repository
- Purpose: Dissemination of Scientific and Technological Information
- Headquarters: PASTIC National Center, Quaid e Azam University, Islamabad, 44000
- Location: Islamabad Capital Territory, Pakistan
- Fields: Science and Technology
- Official language: Urdu, English
- Director General: Muhammad Akram Sheikh
- Parent organization: Pakistan Science Foundation
- Website: www.pastic.gov.pk

The Pakistan Scientific and Technological Information Centre (PASTIC) is a research support and premier national organization of the government of Pakistan with its prime focus on scientific academic principles and research and the dissemination of scientific studies and information technology. It is principally focused on providing academic assistance to scientists, researchers, academics, industrialists, entrepreneurs, planners, and policymakers, among others. It also contains information about science, engineering and technology for research and development of technology.

An expanded project of the Pakistan Council of Scientific & Industrial Research (PCSIR) and a subsidiary of the Pakistan Science Foundation, the PASTIC is headquartered at the Quaid-i-Azam University campus, Islamabad. Its six branches are located in Karachi, Lahore, Faisalabad, Peshawar, Muzaffarabad and Quetta. The PASTIC consists of a database of full-text science and technology documents, publications of the Pakistan Journal of Computer and Information System (PJCIS) and secondary journals of abstracts which are available in ten academic disciplines. It also serves as a database of patents, bibliographic information, compilation of Union catalogues and directories, and reprographic printing services grouped into mimeographing, photocopier and microfilming.

== History ==
The Pakistan Scientific and Technological Information Centre was established in 1974 under the UNESCO-assisted organisation the Pakistan National Scientific and Technical Documentation Centre (PANSDOC) which works under the Pakistan Council of Scientific & Industrial Research (PCSIR). PASTIC was later transferred from PCSIR to Pakistan Science Foundation (PSF) and started serving as a subsidiary of PSF. It also provide financial assistance to the National Digital Archive of Pakistani.

PASTIC plays central role in developing networking of journals and publishers communities with objectives of preservation of national research content. It preserves publishing material in full-text format, standardization of scientific journals, repository. It has maintained a visualization mechanism for reviewing research-oriented materials.

=== Background ===
The PASTIC assist journal publishers in providing free web hosting for journal, import and export of data and data backup in addition to providing financial aid for digitization and capacity building of scientific, journal, and publishing communities.

Working under the Ministry of Science and Technology, its main functions are to provide academic support for researchers with information technology resources. Data is provided through its libraries by coordinating with the Pakistani universities and Center of excellence communities.

== Organisational structure ==
The PASTIC is headed by the Pakistan Science Foundation (PSF) chairperson and the PASTIC's director general. They are responsible for administrative tasks of its sub-centres, management, scientific and technical wings. Management wing consists of accounts. The admin section is responsible for finance and administration of management wing.
