= Shahid Mahmood Baig =

Pakistani geneticist

Shahid Mahmood Baig HI SI
- Education: Government Gordon College; Quaid-i-Azam University
- Awards: Hilal-i-Imtiaz; Sitara-i-Imtiaz
- Scientific career
- Fields: Human genetics Molecular genetics
- Workplaces: National Institute for Biotechnology and Genetic Engineering; Aga Khan University; Pakistan Science Foundation; Health Services Academy; Islamabad University of Health Sciences and Emerging Technologies

Shahid Mahmood Baig (Urdu: شاہد محمود بیگ) is a Pakistani geneticist whose research concerns human molecular genetics and the identification of disease-causing genes in the Pakistani population. He is vice-chancellor of the Islamabad University of Health Sciences and Emerging Technologies (IUHT). He chaired the Pakistan Science Foundation from December 2020 to December 2023 and later became dean of life sciences at the Health Services Academy. In June 2026, he presented the draft of Pakistan's proposed National Genomic Policy at a federal stakeholder consultation. Baig is a fellow of the Pakistan Academy of Sciences and a recipient of the Sitara-i-Imtiaz and Hilal-i-Imtiaz.

== Education ==
Baig received an FSc in biology in 1978 and a BSc in biology in 1981 from Gordon College in Rawalpindi. He then studied at Quaid-i-Azam University, receiving an MSc in biology in 1984, an MPhil in reproductive physiology in 1986 and a PhD in human molecular genetics in 1997. His doctoral research was conducted at Boğaziçi University in Istanbul. He undertook postdoctoral research in molecular biology and genetics at King Saud University in 2000 and in oncogenomics at Duke University in 2012.

== Career and research ==
Baig began his research career at the Nuclear Medicine Oncology and Radiotherapy Institute in 1986. He joined the National Institute for Biotechnology and Genetic Engineering in 1995, where he served as a professor and headed the human molecular genetics group until 2020. In November 2020, the Khyber Pakhtunkhwa cabinet approved Baig's appointment as vice-chancellor of the University of Swabi, but he declined to take up the position. The following month, he was appointed chairman of the Pakistan Science Foundation; he completed his term on 27 December 2023.

In February 2024, Baig joined the Health Services Academy as dean of life sciences. He became an adviser on science and technology at COMSTECH in March 2025. The Islamabad University of Health Sciences and Emerging Technologies subsequently appointed him as its vice-chancellor.

At a stakeholder consultation convened by the Ministry of National Health Services, Regulations and Coordination and the Health Services Academy in June 2026, Baig presented the draft National Genomic Policy. He outlined a proposed roadmap for a national public-health genomics programme, genomic surveillance, workforce development, local diagnostic capacity and preventive screening.

Baig's research has focused on human genetics and the identification of genes associated with inherited disorders. In a 2006 study, Baig and his co-authors analysed beta-thalassaemia mutations among patients from Punjab and Islamabad and described the establishment of prenatal diagnosis for the population studied.

Baig was elected a fellow of the Pakistan Academy of Sciences in 2022 and was formally inducted on 2 December 2023.

== Honours ==
- Sitara-i-Imtiaz, conferred in 2015
- Hilal-i-Imtiaz, announced in 2023 and conferred in 2024
