= Pakistan Halal Authority =

Pakistani trade organisation

Agency overview
- Formed: 2016
- Jurisdiction: Pakistan
- Employees: 34
- Agency executive: Akhtar A. Bughio, Director General
- Parent agency: Ministry of Science and Technology (MoST)
- Website: pakistanhalalauthority.gov.pk

Pakistan Halal Authority Pakistan Halal Authority (PHA) was established under Ministry of Science and Technology (MoST) through an Act of the Parliament No. VIII of 2016 of the Islamic Republic of Pakistan with the mandate to promote trade and commerce in Halal articles and processes.

Vision: Gate way to Halal Assurance.

Mission: To make Pakistan trend setter in Global Halal Industry through Continuous Improvement and innovations by assuring Global Community trust and confidence in Halal Products and Services

== PHA's Land Mark Incentive to Facilitate Pakistani Halal Products Exports ==
The Pakistan Halal Authority (PHA) held its 6th Board of Governors (BoG) meeting under the Chairmanship of Honorable Federal Minister of Science and Technology Mr. Khalid Khan Magsi, during which the following key decisions are approved:

1. Operationalization of the Halal Certification Mark Logo Scheme: The Board approved the official launch of the Halal Certification Mark Scheme in line with the Prime Minister's vision of facilitating ease of doing business and reducing trade barriers for exporters of halal products from Pakistan. This includes the adoption and implementation of the Halal Mark logo. The approved logo will serve as a national symbol of authenticity for halal-certified goods internationally. The scheme is expected to enable PHA to become a self-sustaining organization in accordance with government policy. PHA was expected to receive its final budget allocation from the government in 2015 and generate revenue through its own operations.

2. Revision of Halal Mark License/Certification Fee: In light of Government’s policy Zero Marking Fee on exports (Exempted Halal Marking Fee on all Halal food and Non- food items exported from Pakistan) approved. To increase Halal Exports and to align with international best practices, the Board approved a revised fee structure for the Halal Marking Fee.

Board approved zero Halal Marking fee on exported halal food/non food items and reduced this fee to 50 % on local food items.

3. Approval of MoUs on Halal Trade with various Countries: In a major step toward strengthening international halal trade relations, the Board gave formal approval for Memorandums of Understanding (MoUs) already signed with the following countries:

- Republic of Belarus
- Federation of Malaysia
- Republic of Türkiye
- Republic of Indonesia
- United Arab Emirates

These MoUs will promote mutual recognition of halal standards, remove fee and certificates duplication, reduce trade barriers, facilitate bilateral trade in halal goods and open new markets for Pakistani halal-certified products.

4. Approval for Registration of Slaughterhouses and Food Service Providers The Board approved the formal registration mechanism for slaughterhouses doing international trade, ensuring that facilities comply with Islamic slaughtering practices and hygiene standards.

This move is intended to ensure that the entire supply chain, from slaughter to service, adheres to halal principles and compliance to international Halal Standards.

This is a major requirement for Halal meat exporters as per international best practices in international Halal Trade.

== Mandate and Functions ==
Mandate:

- Promotion of Trade and Commerce in Halal Articles and Processes;
- Assuring Compliance to Global Halal Sector Obligations i.e. SMIIC
- Ascertain Halal status of Products, process and Services being imported and/or Exported.

Functions:

- Development and Implementation of Strategies / Plans / Program for promotion of import / exports and Trade with Foreign Countries and inter-provincial Trade in Halal Articles and processes;
- Development of Policies / Plan / Programs to ensure compliance with Halal Standards;
- Development and Authorization on use of Halal logo for articles and processes;
- Levy fee for issuance or renewal of Halal certificate and/or authorizing use of Halal Logo;
- Inspect and Test product and processes for purpose of Imports & exports
- Arrangement of Public awareness campaigns in Halal sector;
- Secure Global recognition of the Halal Logo;
- Coordination with national, regional and international organizations to strengthen Halal sector.

=== Pakistan Halal Authority Regulations and Schemes ===
PHA has developed following rules and regulations duly approved by government of Pakistan (Federal Cabinet):

1. Pakistan Halal Certification Marks Regulations (2021)
2. Pakistan Halal Authority Business Rules (2021)
3. Pakistan Halal Authority Employees Recruitment Regulations (2021)

PHA has developed following schemes as per its mandate:

1. Halal Certification Marks Logo Scheme
2. Registration / Recognition of Local Halal Certification Bodies (LHCBs)
3. Registration / Recognition of Foreign Halal Certification Bodies (FHCBs)
4. Recognition of Halal Testing Laboratories (HTLs)
5. Registration of Halal Businesses (Restaurants etc.)
6. Registration / Recognition of Slaughter Houses

== Challenges ==
PHA has faced many challenges since its formation. It remained inactive for two years since its formation. The PHA was not fully functional due to lack of required regulations including business rules, service rules, and certificate mark regulation etc., which prevented Pakistan from tapping the huge potential of the international halal market. It took one and a half years for the DG of PHA to open the bank account of PHA.
