= National Institute of Oceanography, Pakistan =

Pakistani governmental department

National Institute of Oceanography قومی ادارہَ جغرافیہَ بحر

Agency overview
- Formed: 1981
- Headquarters: Karachi, Sindh, Pakistan
- Agency executive: Position Vacant, Director General
- Parent agency: Ministry of Science and Technology (Pakistan)
- Website: niopk.gov.pk

The National Institute of Oceanography (NIO), (Urdu: قومی ادارہَ جغرافیہَ بحر) is a department of the Government of Pakistan and a major research institute of Ministry of Science and Technology (Pakistan). The NIO is a science and research executive organization located in Karachi, Sindh, Pakistan. The NIO research and studies are funded by the Federal Government of Pakistan while the facilities are provided by the Sindh Government.

== History ==
NIO was established in 1981 through a Government Resolution to conduct multidisciplinary research in oceanography in the coastal and offshore areas of Pakistan (EEZ 24,000 km^{2}). The institute has 30 qualified marine scientists working on ocean biology/productivity, marine chemistry and environment, physical oceanography/coastal hydraulics, marine geology and geophysics.

== See also ==
- Pakistan Antarctic Programme
- Pakistan Meteorological Department
- Jinnah Antarctic Station
