= Wajid Ali Khan Burki =

Pakistani Surgeon General (1900–1989)

Wajid Ali Khan Burki CBE FRCP FRCPE FRCPGlas FCPS
- واجد علی خان برکی
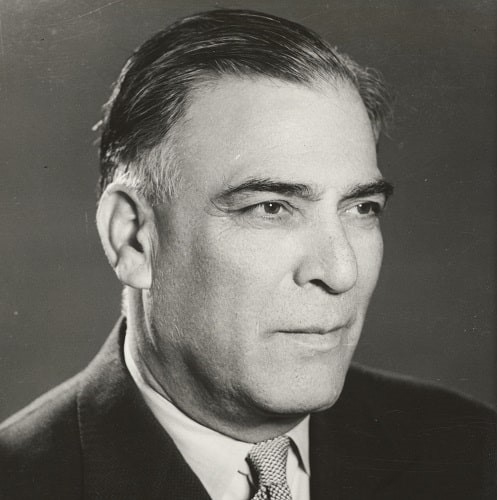
- Official portrait, c. 1962

President College of Physicians and Surgeons of Pakistan
- In office October 1962 – 17 January 1989
- Preceded by: Office established
- Succeeded by: Syed Mohibur Rab

Ambassador to Scandinavia
- In office 21 October 1963 – 1966
- President: Ayub Khan
- Foreign Minister: Mohammad Ali Bogra; Zulfikar Ali Bhutto

Director General Medical Services Pakistan Armed Forces
- In office 27 September 1954 – 29 October 1958
- Preceded by: Lt. Gen. Shaikh Mohamed Afzal Faruki
- Succeeded by: Lt. Gen. M. N. Mahmood

Special Assistant to the President of Pakistan
- In office 9 June 1962 – 19 October 1963
- President: Ayub Khan
Other offices
Federal Minister of Education & Scientific Research, Kashmir Affairs & Minority Affairs
In office 2 March 1962 – 7 June 1962
Minister for Health, Labour and Social Welfare
In office 17 February 1960 – 7 June 1962
Succeeded by	Abdul Monem Khan
Minister for Health, Social Welfare, and Village Aid
In office 28 October 1958 – 17 February 1960
President Ophthalmological Society of Pakistan
In office 19 December 1957 – 20 February 1959

Personal details
- Born: 28 October 1900 Jullundur, Punjab, British India
- Died: 17 January 1989 (aged 88) Rawalpindi, Punjab, Pakistan
- Cause of death: Lung cancer
- Spouse: Iqbal Bano Khanum (m. 1935)
- Children: 5, including Jamshed and Javed
- Relatives: Ahmed Raza (brother-in-law)
- Education: Government College Lahore (FSc); University of St. Andrews (M.D.); Moorfields Eye Hospital (DOMS)
- Nickname(s): Argyll Robertson of Pakistan; W.A.K. Burki

Military service
- Branch/service: British Indian Army; Pakistan Army
- Years of service: 1926-1966
- Rank: Lieutenant General
- Unit: Indian Medical Service (1926-1947); Pakistan Army Medical Corps (1947-1958)
- Commands: Pakistan Army Medical Corps
- Battles/wars: World War II; East African campaign; Western Desert campaign; Burma campaign; Allied invasion of Italy; Battle of the Admin Box; Battle of Imphal; Battle of Kohima
- Awards: See list
- Service number: MZ.3816 (1926-47); PA100002 (1947-66)

Wajid Ali Khan Burki (Note: Urdu: واجد علی خان برکی) (28 October 1900 – 17 January 1989) was a Pakistani ophthalmologist, surgeon, agriculturist, diplomat and author. A three-star rank general of the Pakistan Army Medical Corps, he served as the Director General Medical Services of the Armed Forces from 1954 to 1958. He has been described as the "Argyll Robertson of Pakistan". He also served as Pakistan's Ambassador to Scandinavia from 1963 to 1966.

Born in Jullundur, British India, Khan graduated from Government College, Lahore in 1919 and completed his medical studies at the University of St. Andrews. Beginning his career as a junior clinical assistant at the Royal London Ophthalmic Hospital, he later advanced to senior assistant and earned his Doctorate of Medicine in 1925.

He joined the Indian Medical Service in 1926, ranking first among the only four officers selected from a pool of over sixty foreign-qualified candidates. After working in military hospitals throughout British India, he earned his Diploma in Ophthalmic Medicine and Surgery at Moorfields Eye Hospital in 1932, having trained under John Herbert Parsons. He then became an eye specialist at a military hospital in Meerut.

As acting assistant director of medical services in the Western Desert Campaign of World War II, he was recognised with the honour of Member of the British Empire (MBE). In the Burma campaign, he played a major role in combating diseases such as malaria among British and Indian troops, as assistant director of the 7th Indian Infantry Division.

He received two Mentions in Despatches, the first during the Abyssinian Campaign, as leader of a field ambulance unit of the Ball of Fire, and the second for his contribution in the Battle of the Admin Box. He also served in the Battles of Imphal and Kohima, earning the Commander of the British Empire (CBE). In 1946, he was appointed to a three-member committee tasked with organising and integrating army medical services into a single corps.

After the Partition of British India in 1947, he opted for Pakistan and became the second most senior officer and first Deputy Director General of Medical Services of the Army Medical Corps. In 1954, he was promoted to Director General and the Surgeon General of the Pakistan Armed Forces. In October 1958, he was tasked with enhancing the efficiency of hospitals across the country; notable improvements were observed within days, particularly in Karachi.

In recognition of his effective leadership, General Ayub Khan appointed him as the health minister following his coup d'état later that month. As health minister, he established hundreds of medical facilities, such as the rural health scheme, (Note: Still in operation as of 1989.) and programs for public health which included village dispensaries, the eradication of malaria and smallpox, control of tuberculosis, and the organisation of eye camps. He was also a supporter of rights of workers and members of the press.

During President Ayub Khan's overseas visits, he served as acting President of Pakistan. He also held several ministerial roles and helped facilitate the emigration of Pakistani workers to the United Kingdom and the Middle East in the 1960s. He was instrumental in negotiating with the British Government to establish free immigration rights, which gave the economy of Pakistan a massive boost. He also introduced progressive labor legislation and pioneered Pakistan's second national labor policy.

Following the Bradford smallpox outbreak of 1962, he cracked down on poor vaccination and isolation practices in Karachi. Moreover, he criticised the British government for singling out Pakistani immigrants for the outbreak while ignoring similar conditions among Indian immigrants, questioning the double standard. In meetings with British officials, he condemned the physical violence and abuse directed at Pakistanis in Britain, arguing it stemmed largely from economic fear and resentment.

Between 1958 and 1963, he spearheaded the establishment of several medical organisations, including the Armed Forces Pathological Laboratory, Armed Forces Post Graduate Medical Institute, Pakistan Medical and Dental Council (as Founding Chairman), College of Physicians and Surgeons of Pakistan (as Founding President) and the National Health Laboratories. He was also influential in the founding of Islamabad when the city was being planned in 1959.

He was regarded as a mentor of Zulfikar Ali Bhutto during the early years of Bhutto's political career. Having entered the cabinet in 1958 as a junior minister, Bhutto looked at him for support during cabinet meetings. When Bhutto's position in the cabinet was at risk following President Ayub's introduction of the 1962 Constitution of Pakistan, Khan was credited with helping him retain his position after Bhutto sought his intervention. Khan died of lung cancer in 1989 at the age of 88.

== Early life ==
Wajid Ali Khan was born on 28 October 1900 in Jullundur, in a Sunni Muslim Ormur family. His father, Jehan Khan Burki, the Khan of Baba Khel, was a landowner. He had four brothers, the youngest, Abdul Shaafi Khan Burki (1916–1969), was a pole vault champion who led the All India team to the British Empire Games in 1934.

He received his early education at Government School Jullundur and Forman Christian School Jullundur (1906–1916), Government College Lahore (1916–1919) and then went to the United Kingdom to study medicine at the University of St. Andrews (1919–1924). After graduation, he began working as junior clinical assistant at the Royal London Ophthalmic Hospital from 1924 to March 1925 and then as a senior clinical assistant. In October 1925, he received his Doctorate of Medicine degree from the University of St Andrews after submitting his thesis titled, "Anophthalmia and Microphthalmia."

== Personal life and hobbies ==
He married Iqbal Bano Khanum, a Pashtun, in 1935 and they had five children, three sons Javed Burki, Jamshed Burki, Dr. Nausherwan K. Burki and twin daughters.

In 1961, Barque's Pakistan Trade Directory and Who's who, described him as "an amiable and jovial person, frank, forthright and outspoken. One has to be always alert, always at one's toes, to be popular with him." He enjoyed shooting and fishing, shared fishermen tales, and also contributed to cattle breeding, introducing the Jersey strain to Pakistan. Fond of horses, he held the positions of chairman at the Rawalpindi Race Club and steward at the Jockey Club in Pakistan.

== Service years ==
=== British Indian Army ===
Standing 6 feet tall, he was commissioned into the Indian Medical Service of the British Indian Army on 10 May 1926, ranking as top officer among the only four officers selected from a pool of over sixty foreign qualified candidates. He worked in military hospitals in Jullundur, Bakloh, Quetta, and from 1928 to 1932 in Karachi. After returning to the United Kingdom for further studies in medicine, he obtained his DOMS degree in ophthalmology at Moorfields Eye Hospital in 1932, having trained under John Herbert Parsons and published three papers on exophthalmia and microphthalmia. He was then appointed as an eye specialist at the Indian Military Hospital in Meerut. He was on military leave outside of British India up to 30 September 1933.

During World War II, his career advanced significantly. He was promoted to Lieutenant Colonel and tasked with leading a field ambulance unit in the 5th Infantry Division (India) during the East African/Abyssinian campaign from 1940 to 1941. He served as the acting assistant director of medical services of the division in the Western Desert campaign from 1941 to 1942. In recognition of his services, he was awarded the Member of the Order of the British Empire, promoted to full colonel in 1942, and took on the role of assistant director medical services of the 7th Indian Infantry Division in the Burma campaign, where he played a key role in controlling malaria and other diseases among British and Indian soldiers. He was twice mentioned in despatches, for participating in the Abyssinian campaign and Battle of the Admin Box. He also served in the Battle of Imphal and Battle of Kohima and earned the Companion of the Order of the British Empire for distinguished services.

Brigadier Michael Rookherst Roberts, the General Officer Commanding the 7th Indian Infantry Division, in his book, "Golden Arrow: The Story of the 7th Indian Division in the Second World War, 1939-1945," reflected on the importance of the medical staff during the Burma campaign. He mentioned then Colonel Burki, the Assistant Director of Medical Services of the division and described the tremendous problems Burkis' staff faced. The medical staff carried wounded troops through jungles and rough terrain, which would separate the wounded soldier for a considerable amount of time before expert medical clinical opinion could be mobilised. To address these challenges, medical units became front-line troops in a way, moving their mobile operating theatres extremely close to the battlefield. Roberts credited them for saving many lives.

In April 1945, Colonel Burki was appointed as the Commandant of No. 2 Centre (North) of the Army Medical Corps in Lucknow. Indian Army medical officer Daya Ram Thapar recalled that in this role, Burki had "proved most useful in planning the training of the men as he had personal knowledge of the capabilities of our men as well as their shortcomings, under actual field service conditions." He commanded the Centre until the Partition of British India in August 1947.

By 1946, he was also appointed to a three-man committee tasked with organising and integrating army medical services into a single corps.

=== Pakistan Army ===
==== Early years ====
General Wajid and General Azam taking oath as Ministers in President Ayub Khan's first cabinet (1958)

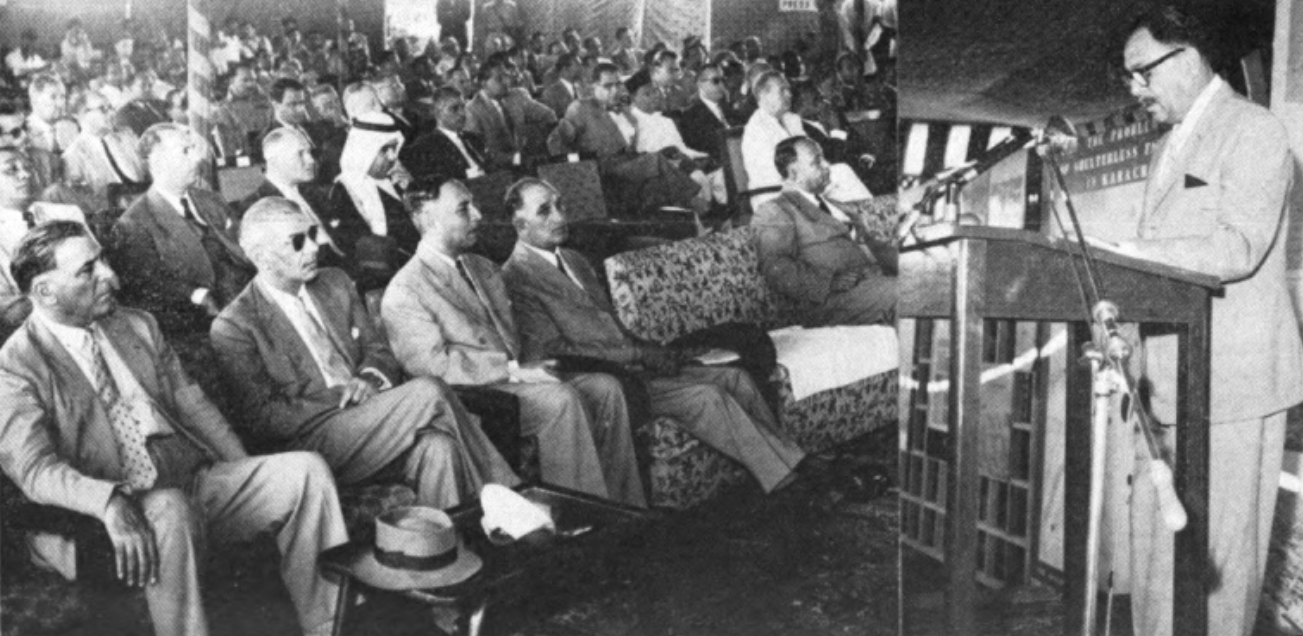
General Wajid, Muhammad Shoaib, Governor State Bank Abdul Qadir, Inspector General Police Fareed Khan, General Azam, listen to President Ayub Khan addressing guests at the foundation stone laying ceremony of the North Karachi Township (1959)

Following the Independence of Pakistan on 14 August 1947, S.M.A. Faruki and Wajid were the two most senior medical officers. They were assigned special numbers, with PA100001 going to Faruki and PA100002 to Wajid.

Subsequently, he was promoted to Brigadier and appointed Deputy Director General of Medical Services. Although approved to be promoted to the rank of Major General before partition, he was officially promoted in 1951. On 27 September 1954, he was promoted to Lieutenant General and succeeded Lieut-Gen S.M.A. Faruki as Director General. He became the Colonel Commandant of Pakistan Army Medical Corps in 1955. Reportedly, fellow Medical Corps General Mohammad Akram and General Wajid shared a hatred for each other.

During the 1956 survey of Pakistan, it was reported that as the Surgeon General of the Pakistan Armed Forces, Wajid was thanked along with the rest of his colleagues for their cooperation by the Nutrition Survey Team who arrived from the United States.

After President Iskandar Ali Mirza's imposition of martial law, General Wajid Ali Khan Burki was appointed Federal Minister for Health and Social Welfare on 12 October 1958 taking oath on 28 October. General Ayub Khan, Commander-in-Chief of the Pakistan Army, assigned him the task of improving the efficiency of hospitals and health agencies on 13 October. Within days, hospitals in Karachi showed significant improvement, and medical services took on a new outlook. When questioned by the press about the new look in medical administration, he remarked, "When a doctor becomes greedy, he is no longer a good doctor. I want to eliminate greed in the medical profession and restore it to its former position of respect and honor." He had earlier expressed dissatisfaction with the administration of civil hospitals in Lahore and Karachi, stating, "We must put such institutions under the charge of army officers to clean up the rot."

==== 1958 Coup d'état ====
Lieutenant Generals Azam Khan, Wajid Ali Khan, and Khalid M. Shaikh were ordered by General Ayub Khan to go to President Iskandar Ali Mirza and tell him to resign, which he did on 27 October 1958. Iskandar sent a secret telegram to the Secretary of State in Washington on 6 November 1958 about the confrontation.

M. N. Mahmood was promoted to Lieutenant General and succeeded him as Director General of Medical Services on 30 October 1958.

==== Ministership (1958—1962) ====
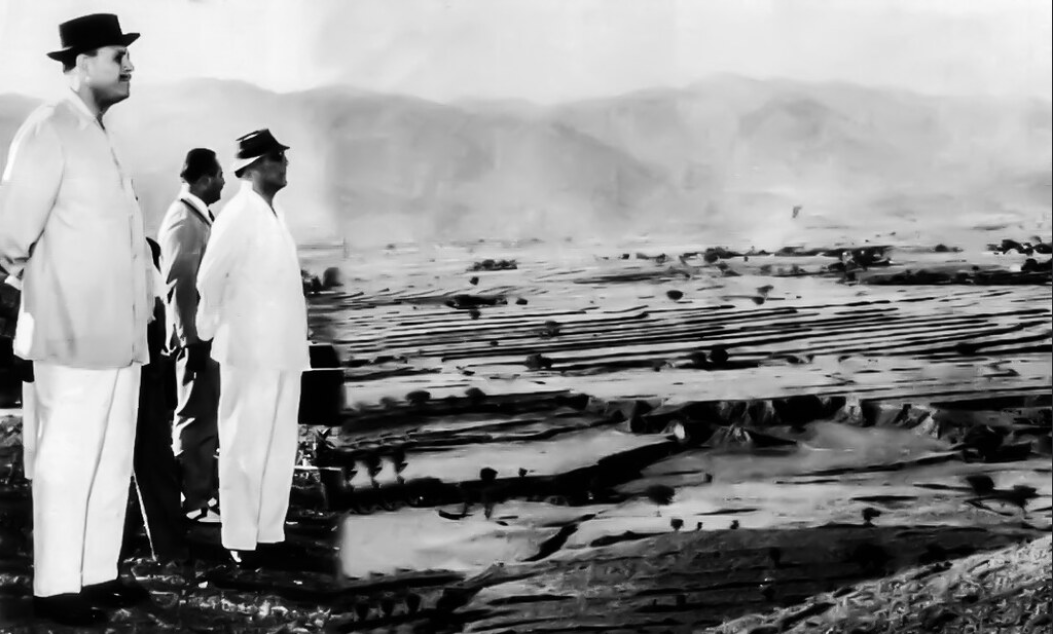
Ayub Khan and Wajid at the site of where the new capital Islamabad is to be built (c. 1960)

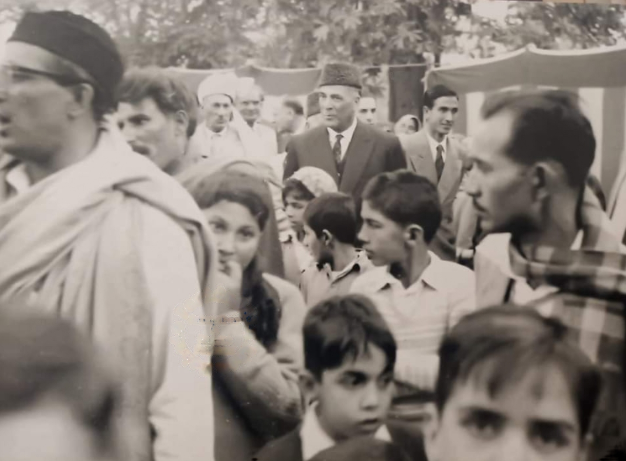
Wajid and a young Nusrat Fateh Ali Khan (biting his thumb) pictured at a Pashtun wedding in Jalandhar, December 1961

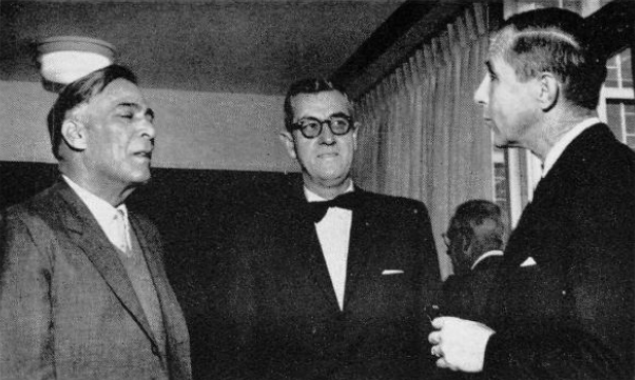
Dr. Burki with Dr. James A. Shannon and Dr. Theodore Woodward at the National Institutes of Health (1962)

In a series of clips, Wajid hosts Jacqueline Kennedy during her visit to Pakistan, showcasing moments with Ambassador McConaughy at the US Embassy and laying a wreath at Quaid-e-Azam's grave alongside Jacqueline & his wife, Iqbal Bano. Afterwards, he is seen seated beside Jacqueline in a convertible, driving past a welcoming crowd of Pakistanis, 1962

He was appointed Federal Minister for Health and Social Welfare on 12 October 1958 taking oath on 28 October. He played an influential role in advising and formulating the health reforms and policies of President Ayub Khan's military administration.

Wajid was pro-modern medicine and tried to ban Unani Tibb in 1959, referring to it as quackery. As a result, Hakeem Muhammad Saeed led a campaign in support of Tibb which led to Wajid withdrawing his proposal after President Ayub Khan passed a law legalising Tibb.

Elected as the first President of the Ophthalmological Society of Pakistan on 19 December 1957 at the King Edward Medical University in Lahore, he resigned on 20 February 1959 due to commitments as Health Minister. By the end of that month, he announced the second labour policy of Pakistan.

In its February 1959 issue, The Atlantic discussed the efforts of General Azam Khan as Rehabilitation Minister and went on to describe Wajid as "an equally energetic officer". The Atlantic noted that after taking over as Health Minister, he had issued a directive that no individual in need of medical care would be denied access to treatment. As a result, within 24-hours after the order was issued, 250 additional beds were arranged in the corridors and verandas of the Civil Hospital in Karachi.

On her first visit to the Royal College of Physicians of Edinburgh in November 1959, Queen Elizabeth II formally signed Munk's Roll. To commemorate this notable event in the history of the college, General Wajid was among those offered Honorary Fellowship and was one of nine individuals who accepted the honour.

On 17 February 1960, he took oath as Minister of Health, Labour, and Social Welfare in Field Marshal Ayub Khan's second cabinet. He allowed many Pakistani workers to move to Britain in the 1960s and forcefully negotiated with the British government to enable free immigration. This not only benefited the Pakistani economy but also set the stage for increased immigration of Pakistanis to the Middle East.

In early April 1960, he said a curb on the high birth rate was necessary to prevent food shortage across the country and that most families barely manage to subsist. He visited Pahlavi Iran from 19 April to 25 April, on an invitation from the Iranian Minister of Health, where he was awarded Iran's Nishan-e-Humayun award.

In May 1960, as part of a voluntary effort, the local people of Shahabad, a village located about 45 miles from Peshawar, along with the Government of Pakistan, began a project to establish a primary health center in the village. The local community donated five acres of land for the center, which received funding from the International Cooperation Administration. The center, with plans for three sub-centers in neighbouring villages, aimed to serve the healthcare needs of 90,000 people and provide training for new nurses. Construction took eight months to complete and the site, chosen by Health Minister Burki, was strategically located on the right bank of the Indus, half a mile from the junction with the Kabul River.

In instances of President Ayub Khan's overseas visits, Wajid assumed the role of acting President of Pakistan. Notably, when Premier Nikita Khrushchev's claimed in May 1960 that an American aircraft flew from Peshawar Air Station over Soviet territory for a photographic mission, Wajid, as acting president, convened an emergency meeting and denied the allegations.

On 1 August 1960, he tasked the Pakistan Army to assist in fighting cholera which had wreaked havoc, causing 200 deaths in eight districts of West Pakistan in two months. That same month, he was elected as an honorary member of the rotary club of Pakistan. He laid the foundation stone for the Southeast Asia Treaty Organization Technical Training Centre in Karachi on 16 September and was elected as a Fellow of the Royal College of Physicians of London that year.

He announced that Pakistan would spend $21,000,000 on family planning during the second five-year plan which was launched in October 1960 and later that year in November, he inaugurated the sixth All-Pakistan Medical Conference at the Pakistan Military Academy House.

In March 1961, he stated to the press that he had agreed to allot five seats in the medical colleges of Pakistan for students from Saudi Arabia to augment the strength of the medical mission in their country. Further stating that if land was allotted, Pakistan may build a hospital there. On 20 May, he welcomed United States Vice President Lyndon B. Johnson, Lady Bird Johnson, and Jean Kennedy Smith at Karachi airport.

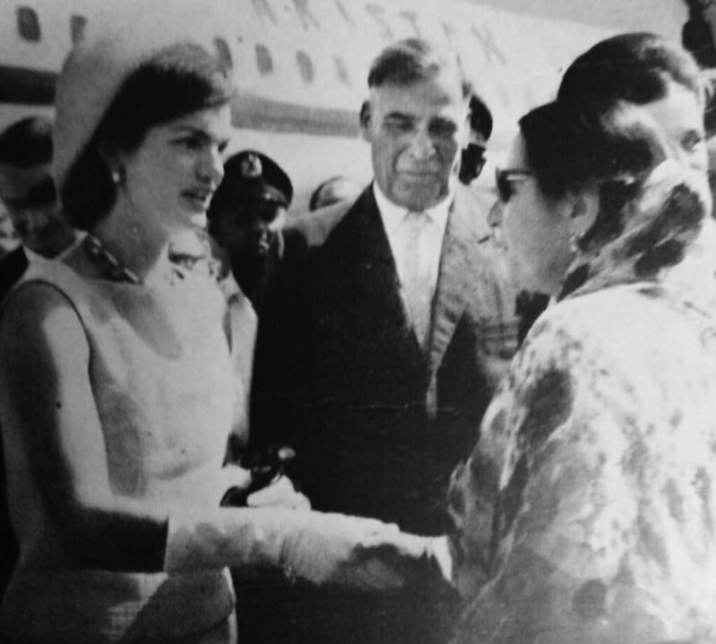
Wajid and his wife, Iqbal Bano, bid farewell to FLOTUS Jacqueline Kennedy as she leaves Pakistan after her five-day visit (1962)

As a strong advocate for labourers rights, Wajid prescribed 'shock treatment' for mill owners in order to make them treat their workers better in a speech given on 20 August 1961. He was designated as Federal Minister of Education & Scientific Research, Kashmir Affairs and Minority Affairs on 2 March 1962. Later that month, he hosted First Lady Jacqueline Kennedy and her sister Lee Radziwill during their goodwill tour of Pakistan from 21 to 26 March.

He was commended by the Association of American Medical Colleges for his contributions to enhancing medical education and community health conditions in Pakistan. The Journal of Medical Education in its 1962 edition highlighted that he was instrumental in fostering collaboration between the Government of Pakistan and the University of Maryland School of Medicine to establish the International Center for Medical Research and Training at the Institute of Hygiene in Lahore.

In May 1962, he accompanied President Ayub Khan on his visit to East Pakistan where they were received by Governor Ghulam Faruque Khan.

The Pakistan Association of Medical Editors in its book, Medical History, wrote: "Gen. Burki maintained very good relations with the late Mr. Zulfiqar Ali Bhutto, who looked at him as a sort of mentor since Mr. Bhutto had joined the 1958 cabinet as a very junior minister and looked to General Burki for support during cabinet meetings."

On the evening of 8 June 1962 when President Ayub Khan enacted his 1962 Constitution of Pakistan, Zulfikar Ali Bhutto was almost dropped from the cabinet. Burki was described as coming to his rescue when Bhutto "entreatingly" approached him at the President's reception that evening, and Burki got him included in the new set-up.

==== Special Assistant ====
He was appointed as Special Assistant to President Ayub Khan on 9 June 1962, with the privileges of a minister but without a position in the cabinet, serving until 19 October 1963.

During his overseas visit to the United Kingdom and United States in 1962, his alma mater University of St. Andrews conferred him with an Honorary doctorate on 10 October and the University of Maryland, Baltimore awarded him an honorary LL.D on 24 October.

=== Diplomatic career ===
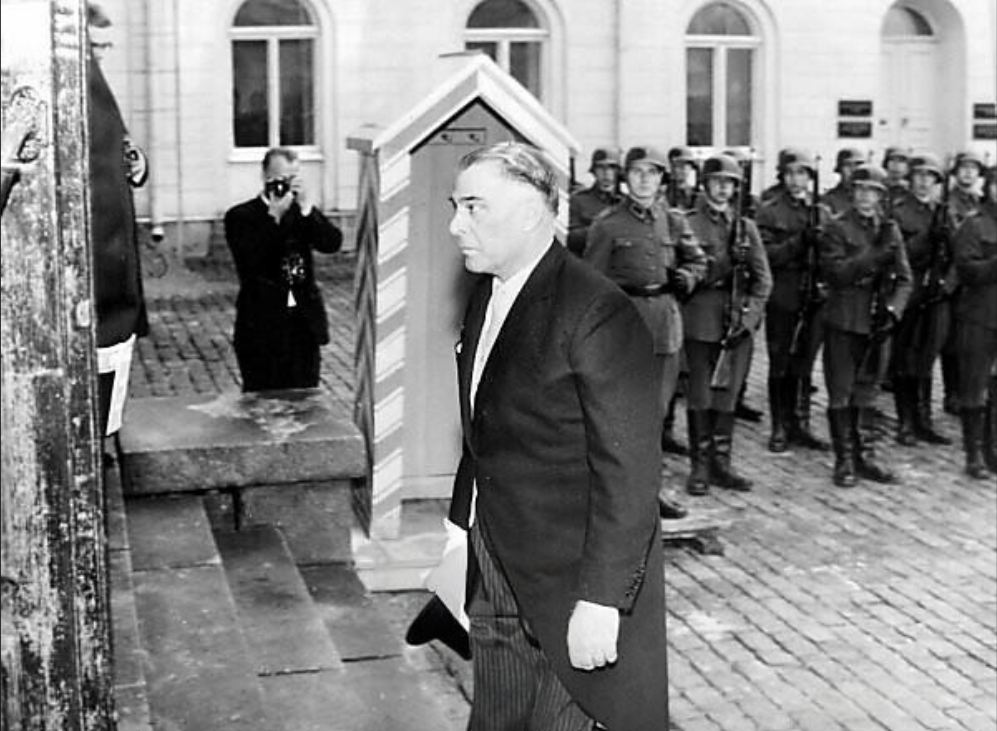
Wajid in Helsinki passing the Guard of Honour (1963)

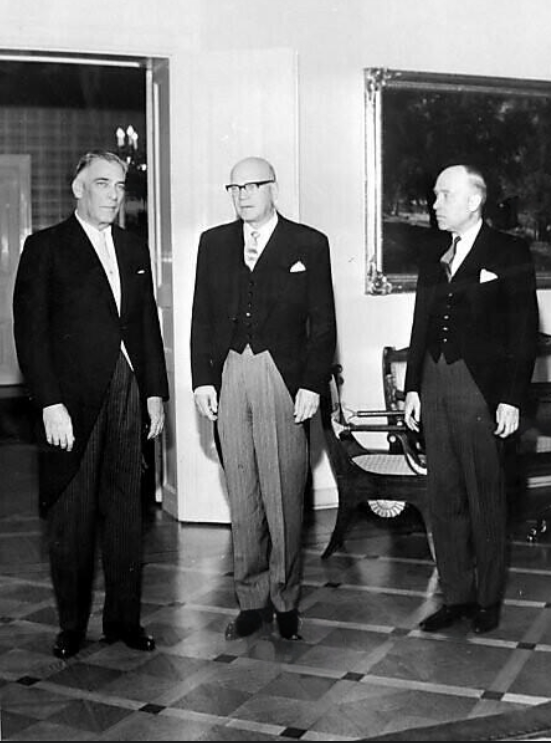
Wajid with President of Finland Kekkonen and Minister of Foreign Affairs Veli Merikoski (1963)

He was appointed as Ambassador of Pakistan (resident in Stockholm) to the Scandinavian countries Norway, Denmark, Sweden, and accredited to Finland, arriving in Helsinki on 21 October 1963 where he presented his letters of Credence to President Urho Kekkonen.

== Later life ==
He lived a quiet life after retirement and kept himself busy at the College of Physicians and Surgeons of Pakistan as president.

In 1972, the trade journal of the Karachi Chamber of Commerce & Industry, described him as a "Medical Specialist by profession but a straight honest and truthful soldier by vocation".

The Ophthalmological Society of Pakistan in its meeting in 1981 awarded him the Ramzan Ali Syed Gold Medal presented by the chief guest Prince Karim Aga Khan but he refused it, telling the organisation to award it to Professor Raja Mumtaz, who Wajid said was "an institution in himself and a great anthropologist". Raja reluctantly accepted and was awarded officially in 1986.

== Illness and death ==
In 1988, Wajid noticed a persistent cough and after undergoing tests, was diagnosed with lung cancer in December 1988. Despite his earlier days as a heavy smoker, he and Field Marshal Ayub Khan had quit smoking on the advice of Professor Charles Wells, who had come to Pakistan to guide the Medical Reforms Commission. Wajid, however, chose to keep his diagnosis a secret, even from his wife, and explicitly instructed his doctors not to inform anyone, with his oldest son, Dr. Nausherwan Burki, being the only one who was aware of his condition.

On 15 January 1989, two days before his death, he had chaired a meeting at the College of Physicians and Surgeons Pakistan and the news of his passing came as a shock to the medical and journalist communities, and his family who had no knowledge of his illness. President Ghulam Ishaq Khan mourned his death and Wajid was buried with full military honours.

== Commemorations ==
- 'The General Wajid Ali Burki Medal' is awarded to one deserving graduating student each year by the College of Physicians and Surgeons of Pakistan at its convocation each year.
- The Burki Urdu Medium School in Lahore was named after him.
- The 1993 edition of the Royal College of Physicians Munk's Roll stated, "Wajid Ali Burki specialized in opthalmology, but he had wider interests and an exceptional talent which insured his success in administrative services to his country at the highest level" and that he, "achieved eminence in every field that he was called upon to play a part in."

== Publications ==
Humphrey Neame; Wajid Ali Khan (1925). Glaucoma Secondary to Choroidal Sarcoma. The Treatment of Painful Blind Glaucomatous Eyes. Vol. 9. London: British Journal of Ophthalmology. pp. 618–627.

Wajid Ali Khan (1926). Pedigree of Lamellar Cataract. Vol. 10. London: British Journal of Ophthalmology. pp. 387–389.

Wajid Ali Khan (1926). Atypical Coloboma of the Iris. Vol. 10. London: British Journal of Ophthalmology. pp. 389–390.

Wajid Ali Khan (1926). Pathogenesis of Microphthalmia. Vol. 10. London: British Journal of Ophthalmology. pp. 625–648.

"Ordinances passed by Lt. General W.A. Burki" (PDF). Ministry of Law and Justice (Pakistan). 1961. pp. 77–8, 162, 185.

Burki, W. A. (April 1962). Post-Revolution Labor Policy and Planning [in Pakistan]. Eastern Worker, Bureau of Labor Publications, Karachi.

Burki, Wajid A. (1988). Autobiography of an army doctor in British India and Pakistan. Rawalpindi: Burki House.

== Effective dates of promotion ==
Insignia	Rank	Branch	Promotion date
	Lieutenant General	Pakistan Army	28 September 1954
	Major General	Pakistan Army	1951
	Brigadier	Pakistan Army	1947
	Colonel	British Indian Army	7 May 1946
	Lieutenant Colonel	British Indian Army	10 November 1945
	Major	British Indian Army	1 April 1937
	Captain	British Indian Army	10 May 1929
	Lieutenant	British Indian Army	10 May 1926

== Awards, decorations, and recognitions ==
- (2) Mentioned in despatches
- Appointed Member of the Most Excellent Order of the British Empire (MBE) in 1941, in recognition of distinguished services in the Middle East.
  - Promoted to Commander of the Most Excellent Order of the British Empire (CBE) on 13 November 1945 by King George VI in recognition of gallant and distinguished services in Burma during World War II.
- Medallion of Deucalion (1956) (Note: The Medallion of Deucalion was awarded to Generals Burki, Chaudhuri, Gorby, Hall, Hayes, and Brigadier Shier at the D.G.A.M.S. Annual Exercise, hosted by Major General F.M. Richardson in 1956.)
- Nishan-e-Humayun of Iran (1960)
- Fellow of the Royal College of Physicians of London (1960)
- Dubbed the "Argyll Robertson of Pakistan" by the Asia Pacific Academy of Ophthalmology Congress (1979)
- In a biographical account published by the Pakistan Association of Medical Editors, he was described as the "Father of Medical Services in Pakistan".

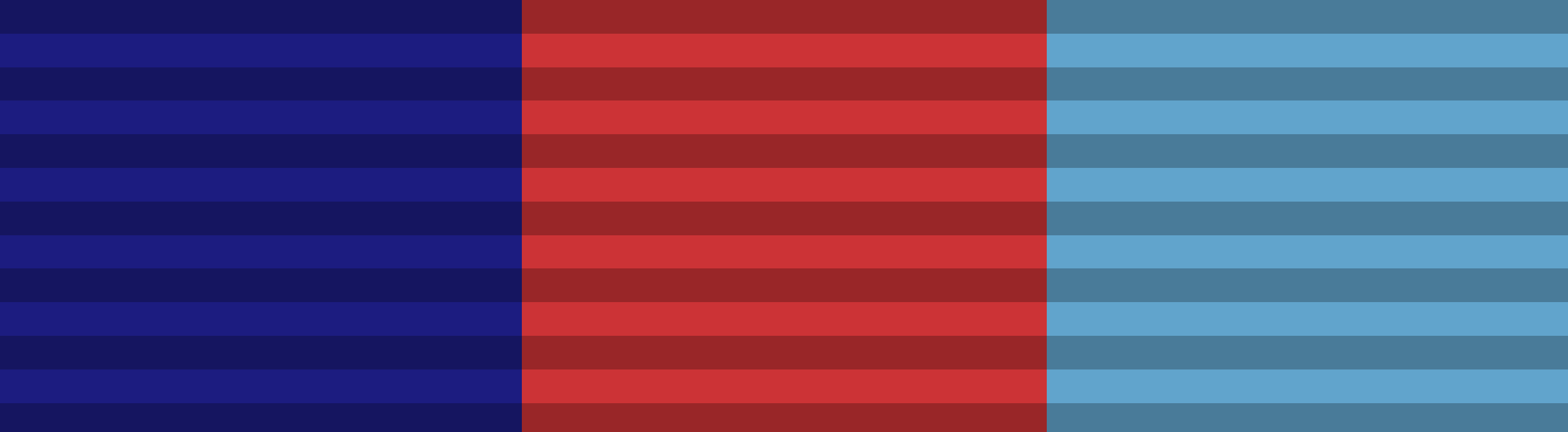

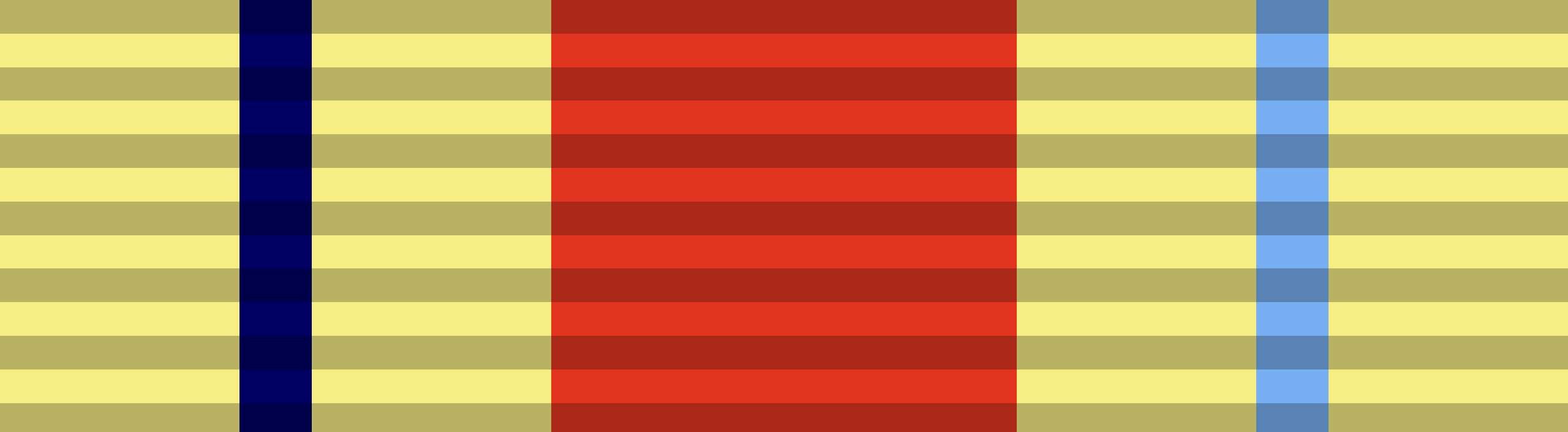

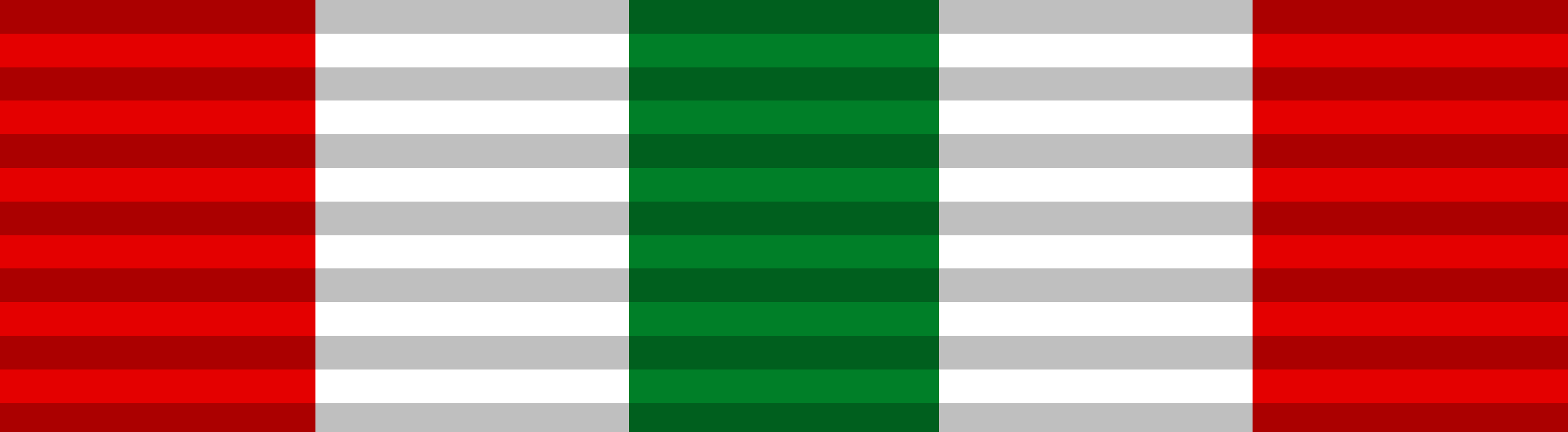

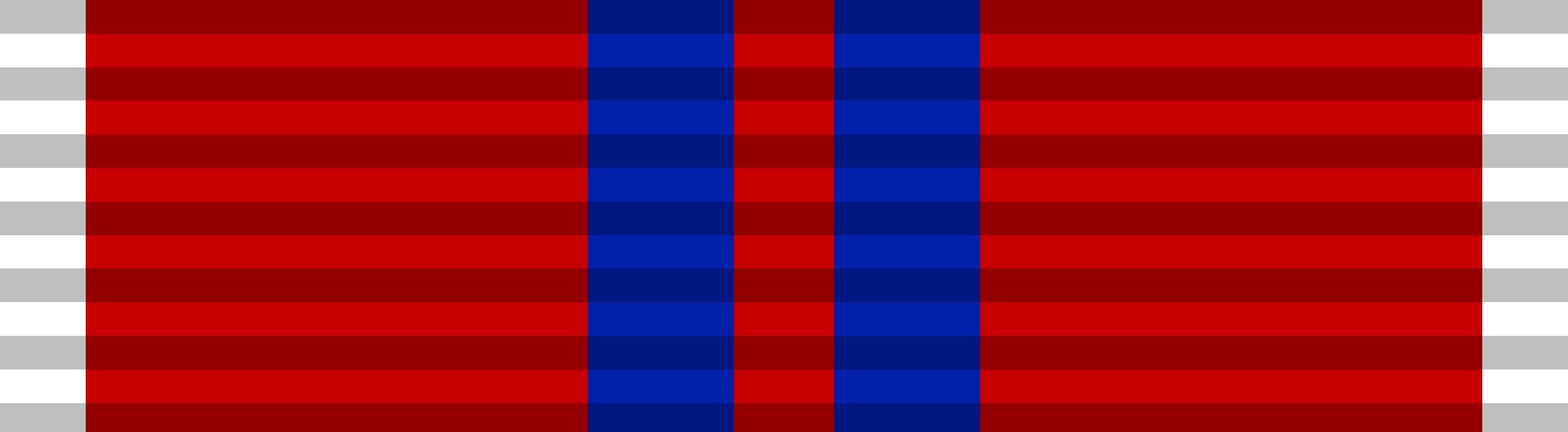

Member of the Most Excellent Order of the British Empire (MBE); 1942 Commander of the Most Excellent Order of the British Empire (CBE); 1945		Pakistan Medal (Pakistan Tamgha) 1947	
Tamgha-e-Qayam-e-Jamhuria (Republic Commemoration Medal) 1956	1939-1945 Star	Africa Star	Burma Star
Italy Star	War Medal 1939-1945	India Service Medal 1939–1945	Queen Elizabeth II Coronation Medal (1953)
