= Health Services Academy =

Health Services Academy (اکیڈمی خدمات صحت) is an institution of the Pakistan's Ministry of Health that imparts public health degree MSPH. It is located in Islamabad adjacent to the National Institute of Health (Pakistan).
