= Pakistan Council for Science and Technology =

Advisory council

- پاکستان مجلسِ برائے سائنس و فنیات

Federal advisory council overview
- Jurisdiction: Government of Pakistan
- Headquarters: Islamabad
- Minister responsible: Agha Hassan Baloch, Federal Minister for Science and Technology
- Federal advisory council executives: Agha Hassan, President; Nasim Nawaz, Vice President
- Website: pcst.org.pk
- Agency ID: PCST

Pakistan Council for Science and Technology (PCST) is a government-owned advisory council responsible for policy making, planning, implementation and carrying out policy studies of science and technology. It is also mandated to advise the federal government on development of fields of science and technology in Pakistan. PCST also acts as the secretariat of National Commission of Science and Technology (NCST), chaired by the Prime Minister of Pakistan. Its constitution was approved by National Assembly of Pakistan in an act called, The Pakistan Council for Science and Technology Act, 2016.

== Structure ==
Pakistan Council for Science and Technology usually comprises the following members.

=== President ===
Minister for Science and Technology

=== Vice President ===
Secreretary, Science and Technology Division

=== Members ===
- Secretary, Planning and Development Division or his nominee
- Secretary, Finance Division or his nominee
- Executive Director Higher Educatron Commission
- Secretary of the Division controlling subject matter of education and training (or his nominee)
- President, Pakistan Academy of Sciences (or his nominee)
- Chairman. Pakistan Engineering Council
- Chairman, Pakistan Council of Scientific and Industrial Research
- Chairman, Pakistan Science Foundation
- Representatives of provincial governments
- Five eminent scientists from academia, one each from four provinces and federal capital
- Two eminent industrialists to be nominated by the Federal Government
- President, Federation of Pakistan Chamber of Commerce and Industries, Islamabad
- Dealing officer (not below the rank of Joint Secretary of the Division controlling the subject matter of science and technology)
- Two parliamentarians, one each from Senate and National Assembly.
- Chairperson, Pakistan Council for Science and Technology

== See also ==
- Pakistan Council of Scientific & Industrial Research
