= National Institute of Electronics (Pakistan) =

Autonomous research institution

Agency overview
- Formed: 1979; 46 years ago
- Employees: 223
- Minister responsible: Dr. Khalid Maqbool Siddiqui, Minister of Science and Technology
- Agency executive: Zawar Hussain, Director General
- Parent department: Ministry of Science and Technology
- Website: nie.gov.pk
- Agency ID: NIE

The National Institute of Electronics (NIE) (قومی ادارہ برائے تحقیقِ الیکترانیات) is an autonomous research institution under administrative control of the Ministry of Science and Technology (Pakistan) of the Pakistan. Zawar Hussain is current Director General.

== History ==
The National Institute of Electronics was established in 1979 through an ordinance proclaimed by the President of Pakistan.

== Research and development labs ==
The institution has the following research and development departments:

- Automation & Control Engineering Group
- Center for Software Development & Training in Advance Databases
- Center for Quality Testing & Certification of Electronics Products
- Communication Engineering Group
- Integrated Circuit Design Center
- Large Scale Electronic Display Group
- PCB Design & Fabrication

== Products ==
NIE produce different products related to electronics field, including electronic voting machines, ECG machines, GSM based energy meters, surface mount technology production lines (SMTPL), 1KVA smooth power line conditioners and 3KVA solar based inverters.

=== Electronic voting machine ===
In 2015, NIE produced first electronic voting machine (EMV) for Election Commission of Pakistan. In 2021, NIE started productions of upgraded version of electronic voting machine on directions of Ministry of Science and Technology (MoST). Each EMV consist of 3 units with following specifications.

Control Unit
Specifications	Type/details	Notes
LCD	16×2 alphanumeric	
Dimensions	6” x 4” x 1.5”	Length, width and height
Temperature range	-40°C to 85°C	
Memory storage	4KB EEPROM memory	with external 4GB SD memory card
Battery	3000mAh	14.3V battery capable of providing 16-hour backup on full operation

Vote Casting Unit
Specification	Type/details	Notes
Microcontroller	Atmel ATmega2560	
Dimensions	18” × 6” × 1.5”	Length × width × height
Buttons	30 push-buttons	button switches corresponding to number of candidates
Speaker	60Hz ~ 20KHz audio speaker	3W, Single, 4 ohms impedance
Buzzer	20 ohm impedance piezoelectric buzzer	buzzer operating at 5V DC
Temperature Range	-40°C to 85°C	
Memory	microcontroller-4KB EEPROM (internal)	4GB SD memory card (external)
Battery	3000mAh (44Wh)	14.8V battery with capacity of 16-hour backup on full operation

Ballot Printing Unit
Specifications	Type/details	Notes
Dimensions	145mm × 192mm × 148mm	(width × depth × height)
Print speed	200mm/s	1600 dots/line
Paper Roll	80mm (width)	
Temperature range	operating capability between 5 and 45°C	(–20 to 60°C storage temp)
Memory	384KB internal (Flash), 4KB/45B buffer size	
Additional	Full/partial cut support, bitmap image printing, 1D and 2D barcode support	

=== LED lights ===
NIE produce different types of LED lights.

- LED light (ceiling)
- LED street light
- LED tube lights

== NIEECHS ==
National Institute of Electronic Employees Cooperative Housing Society (NIEECHS) is a housing society for employees of NIE, with 230 Kanals land on Fateh Jang Road near Nougazi, close to sector F-16 Islamabad. It was established in 1980.
