= Armed Forces Institute of Pathology (Pakistan) =

Military medicine institute in Pakistan

Coordinates: 33.580337°N 73.045786°E

- Former name: Armed Forces Pathological Laboratory
- Type: Military biodefense/chemical defense
- Established: 1957; 69 years ago
- Founder: Wajid Ali Khan Burki
- Academic affiliations: Pakistan Army Medical Corps
- President: Major General Hafeez Uddin
- Location: Rawalpindi Cantonment, Punjab, Pakistan
- Nickname: AFIP
- Website: afip.gov.pk

The Armed Forces Institute of Pathology (Reporting name: AFIP) is the main Pakistani institution for defensive research into countermeasures against biological warfare. It is located in the vicinity of CMH Rawalpindi alongside the Armed Forces Institute of Cardiology in Rawalpindi Cantt, Punjab, Pakistan. Established in 1957, the AFIP, supported by civilian and military pathologists, has been engaged in the task of combating virus outbreaks in Pakistan.

== History ==
=== Pre-independence era ===
Station hospital facilities were initially developed for the Indian troops. They depended entirely on their regimental hospitals for medical treatment. In October 1918, Station Hospitals were sanctioned for the Indian troops. The Indian Hospital Corps (IHC) was initially divided into 10 Division Companies, which corresponded to the 10 existing Military Divisions in India and Burma. They were located at Peshawar, Rawalpindi, Lahore, Quetta, Mhow, Poona, Meerut, Lucknow, Secunderabad, and Rangoon.

The whole corps was reorganized. On a command basis, five companies of the IHC were created in 1932. The companies were located as follows: No. 1 Company was at Rawalpindi, No. 2 Company at Lucknow, No. 3 Company at Poona, No. 4 Company at Quetta, and No. 5 Company at Rangoon. World War II was responsible for rapid developments. The idea of having a homogeneous corps by amalgamating the IMS and IMD gradually took shape, and Indian Army Medical Corps (IAMC) came into being on 3 Apr 1943. The medical institutions of the IAMC were concentrated in the areas that were to subsequently become Pakistan.

The British Raj in India left a significant legacy in the territory, which later became Pakistan. The bulk of the troops of the British Indian Army were recruited from the areas that now constitute Pakistan. The threats posed by the Russian empire and a fear of Afghans and Central Asian forces overrunning the Indian territory, made the British rulers particularly cautious about the northwestern borders across the Hindu Kush mountains. The army was deployed on a large scale. Rawalpindi served as the pivotal military base, from which they controlled the command, logistics, and services provided to those troops. It was the Headquarters of Northern Command, India. Therefore, the city housed many offices and institutions.

Armed Forces Medical Services were one of the most organized and highly developed support services in the British Indian Army. The members of the medical profession served in the IMS (Indian Medical Services), with pride and dignity. The senior jobs in civil medical services were also reserved for the medical professionals of the army.

The troops of British Indian Army were deployed over an extensive area. They were exposed to the tropical climate. They were present in the heights of Chitral in the north-west to Burma in the east. The major bulk of their health related problems were of tropical infections and parasitic infestation. The medical services were committed for the prevention and treatment of tropical diseases. The diagnosis of these diseases was based upon the rudimentary laboratory service. The need for pathology services was, therefore, recognized even in those days. A well organized and up to the mark pathology organization was established. That was the time when experienced pathologists, especially, those dealing with the tropical pathology, served in IMS.

As we mentioned earlier, Rawalpindi was the headquarters of the northern Command of the India. Combined Military Hospital (CMH) and Military Hospital (MH) were the largest and the most well-equipped hospitals in this area at that time. Alongside these major hospitals and field medical services, a pathology laboratory, the Command Laboratory, Northern Command, was established. This was indeed the best Armed Forces laboratory, which the newly independent Pakistan inherited from the British India in 1947.

=== After 1947 ===
Lt Col Sarup Narayan was the first Commanding Officer of this laboratory, at the time of independence. He originally belonged to Rawalpindi area and had happily opted to stay and serve in Pakistan. However, due to obvious reasons, he felt it difficult to continue living in Pakistan and he had to migrate to India for personal reasons. He was a very brilliant, hardworking and well mannered pathologist. He ultimately rose to the rank of Lt General in the Indian Army Medical Corps and was appointed as the Director of Medical Services (Research).

After independence, Pakistan Army Medical Corps (AMC) was established from the fragmented available resources (monetary as well as personnel). Two senior IMS officers, Lt Gen S.M.A. Faruki and Lt Gen Wajid Ali Khan Burki, played a key role in early formative years of AMC. Shortly afterwards the Command Lab. at Rawalpindi was raised to the status of the Central Military Pathological Laboratory (CMPL). This cumbersome name was a legacy of the mother unit of the same name at Poona (India).

The CMPL had started its existence in a small premises as a Central Diagnostic and Reference Laboratory for the Army, the Navy and the Air Force. Apart from being a diagnostic laboratory, it was also given the task of production of some reagents and bio-products. This was the modest beginning and the services were gradually evolved into a comprehensive institute, which is now called as Armed Forces Institute of Pathology (AFIP). It had very basic equipment, limited infrastructure and the tests used were conventional and very basic ones.

The CMPL, as an army unit was commanded by Lt Col Muhammad Said, for a short duration. He was once again replaced by then Lt Col Manzoor Ahmed Chaudhry who by then had a background of heading the unit. Once the tradition is set, a smooth functioning can be ensured by a good command and control.

=== CMPL to AFIP-1957 ===
It was with the advice received in the form of a letter from Major Syed Azhar Ahmad that the CMPL was designated as Armed Forces Institute of Pathology (AFIP) on 20 August 1957. He was then being trained at AFIP Washington. As the CMPL was to be transformed to an institute of excellence, the infrastructure needed to be developed and the facilities enhanced. The existing working and administrative space had by then become too crowded and the quality work needed smooth mobility of the action. Therefore, more room was needed and a double-storey building was constructed which was later considered unsuitable for the work of the AFIP and was handed over to the newly created Armed Forces Medical College.

It must be put on record that late Lt Gen W.A.Burki, was very keen to improve the scientific basis of AMC and was a moving force behind many projects of development. A new building was desperately needed for the institute. It needed finances, planning and supervision. It must not be forgotten at this stage that the finances were arranged by a very kind gesture of late Chaudhri Mohammad AH, then finance minister of the Federal Government. Chaudhri Mohammad Ali had to visit the AFlP quite frequently. During his visits, he too felt the need of an advanced diagnostic laboratory service and provided necessary financial support for the construction of the new building. He later became the Prime Minister of Pakistan and continued helping AFIP for long period of time. A large purpose built double-storey building was planned by Maj (later Col) SMH Bokahari, who took personal efforts in its design and construction. A new purpose-built building for AFIP was completed in 1958.

Lt Col Noor Ahmed was appointed the Commanding Officer of AFIP, in September 1957. He was a very learned and experienced pathologist of that time. He had long served in the Indian Medical Department (IMD) of the Army and in the Indian Army Medical Corps. He was an excellent bench worker and a keen teacher, who himself had worked very hard and expected the same from others. He was highly disciplined, tough task master and took a keen interest in the lab work, improvement of the premises, postgraduate teaching and maintenance of a high quality work.

During the tenure of Lt Col Noor Ahmed, a very well organised and systematic programme of academic activities and research was set up in this institute, on sound scientific basis. He was also responsible for raising the standards of (so far neglected) histopathology services in the Army. It was the fruit of his concerted efforts that the AFIP in Pakistan established close cordial links with AFIP Washington, D.C. and various American and British Universities. In 1959, during his Command, Armed Forces Tumour Registry was started. This was the beginning of the organised study of malignant tumours in Pakistan. The suggestion was once again made by Major (now Lt Gen Retired Syed Azhar Ahmed).

When the locally available meager training resources of pathologists were exhausted, the matter of training of pathologists abroad was seriously taken, during his tenure. Consequently, Major (now Maj Gen Retd) M.I.Burney completed a one-year training course in Virology in Walter Reed Army Institute of USA. As he returned, the department of Virology was established on modern lines. The department was engaged in the study of Asian Flu effect on local population. He maintained his interest in parasitology and entomology. It was he, who discovered a new focus of Kala-Azar in Gilgit and Baltistan. A new species of sand fly flourishing in this cold climate was also discovered and named after Lt Col M.I. Burney as Phlebotomus Brunei.

The newly constructed building of AFIP had to be furnished. So far, all the laboratory furniture including laboratory benches were imported from abroad. This was most probably the first time when it was manufactured locally, instead of being imported. Messrs Abdullah and Sons from Gujranwala accepted the task and they made all the furniture indigenous at a remarkably low price. Many such benched are still being used at AFIP. All the services like a high voltage electricity, water and gas were all supplied smoothly on a regular basis on these benches.

The federal capital was shifted from Karachi to Rawalpindi, in 1958. The AFIP was the mainstay of the diagnostic laboratory services in that city. Therefore, the responsibilities of AFIP increased further. It was then supposed to look after the ministers and senior civil servants of the Federal Government of Pakistan ad their family members.

Mr Mohammad Shoaib was then the Finance Minister. He used to attend AFIP for his regular check-up. He found the AFIP premises uncomfortable during the hot seasons. The building was closed and the newly inducted heavy gadgetry generated a lot of heat, in the close space. The working atmosphere was uncomfortable and it was a really tough task to work there. The patient reception area was extremely unpleasant. Mr Mohammad Shoaib shared the discomfort with other patients and he generously sanctioned a handsome amount for bringing changes. It was spent for the fixation of a modern central air conditioning plant for the building. It had an added advantage of the provision of a dust free environment. The constant temperature was needed for the fine functioning of many pieces of equipment and the conditions needed for the performance of sophisticated tests.

During those days, the pressing demands of quality pathology service had compelled the AFIP to assume the role of a Central Reference Laboratory. It provided services for the Armed Forces, as well civil sector. The general population belonging to civil sector of this region, including many medical institutions in and around Rawalpindi benefited its expertise. This gave it new prestige and status.

=== 1962 ===
Colonel Noor Ahmad retired from his Army service and Lt Col Manzoor Ahmad Chaudri was called to take over the Command of this Institute, in August 1962 once again. A steady progress was maintained and some of the first generation automated laboratory equipment was introduced at that time. Major (Major General in Bangladesh Army) Mahmud ur Rahman Chaudhary worked in microbiology before he was sent to NIH, Islamabad.

By then the department of virology was fully established. It was soon designated as National Centre for Viral Diseases. During this period, a proper animal house was also constructed and a Departmental of Experiment Pathology was established. It was used for animal experimentation and the production of reagents. The reagents produced there were provided to the pathology laboratories of the peripheral hospitals. It was always run without the hiring of veterinary personnel and high tech work. It was conventionally looked after by the officers of Virology department. Some sweepers were trained to feed and look after the animals. Gradually, the dependence on the use of animals had been declining, as more emphasis was laid upon the use of more sophisticated technology.

=== 1970 ===
In July 1970, Col (now Late Maj Gen) M.I.Burney took over as Commanding Officer of AFIP.

=== 1973 ===
In August 1973 Col (now Late Maj Gen) M.I.Burney was seconded to the civil as executive director of the National Institute of Health, Pakistan and Lt Col (now Retd Lt Gen) Syed Azhar Ahmed was appointed as the Commandant of the institute. His tenure was a period of continuing improvement and progress in every field. A major training programme was started and young officers were selected for higher training in Pakistan and abroad. The forum of the College of Physicians and Surgeons of Pakistan was utilized for this purpose and within few years a large number of candidates qualified for FCPS in pathology. To help the pathologists who fund the FCPS difficult at that time to do were helped by M.Phil. training programme, which was started in 1982 for the first time. Since-then a large number of Armed Forces pathologists as well as civilian doctors availed AFIP facilities for their research for M.Phil. thesis. A large number of very brilliant young officers was also sent for training abroad especially to UK and USA. By this action, he laid the foundations of future of sound basis of Virology, Immunology, Histopathology, Microbiology, Chemical Pathology and Nuclear Medicine. Major (Now Lt Gen Karamat Ahmad Karamat, HI(M) in July 1973 as a Microbiologist with dip Bact (London) and MRC Path (London) and remained in the team of Lt Gen Syed Azhed Ahmed till May 1981.

A very important decision at this time was to establish a Nuclear Medical Centre as a part of AFIP. A new building was constructed for this purpose in a record period of eight and a half months. Simultaneously the required equipment was purchased, the officers and staff were selected and trained and within a year, the centre was made functional. Further training of these officers was arranged in UK and two of item obtained their master's degree in nuclear medicine from the London University.

The premises of the institute were also expanded and a special emphasis was laid upon the improvement of facilities for the visiting patients and the staff. In 1983 a completely new block was designed and constructed for patient's reception. It contained different waiting rooms for officers, other ranks, families and the civilian patients. A canteen block was completed in 1984.

An entirely new block in the name of Advanced Diagnostic and Research Centre (ADRC) was also planned in 1983. It was approved in early 1984 and, in a phased programme; the whole project was completed in 1988. This provided 24,000 square feet (2,200 m^{2}) of additional laboratory space in a modern building with adequate training and research facilities. Subsequently, the departments of Haematology as well as Chemical pathology were housed in that building. Some space was subsequently utilized there for Immunology as well as Molecular biology.

=== 1988 ===
In 1988, Lt Gen Syed Azhar Ahmed left AFIP to become the executive director of national Institute of Health. The new Commandant of AFIP was Brigadier (now Maj Gen) Manzoor Ahmad. Maj Gen Manzoor Ahmed has been a very active participant in the progress and development of AFIP for over thirty years. He had a sound background of extensive training in Histopathology from the best centre of USA. He had been previously posted to PNS Shifa, Karachi. There he was involved in teaching of the postgraduate level at newly established Jinnah Postgraduate Medical Centre. He had been pioneer of the research in medical sciences with the collaboration of Dr Sarwar Jehan Zuberi and Prof Naeem Aon Jaaaferi.

His team included the professional stalwarts like a great Haematologist Brig Mohammad Saleem and a renowned Microbiologist, Brig Abdul Hannan. The trained pathologists returned from abroad. They were Captain (now Major General) Farooq Ahmad Khan after obtaining PhD from London, Major (now Brigadier) Waheed Uz Zaman Tariq after obtaining his DpBact (Manchester) and MRCPath (London) in Virology and Maj (now Brigadier) Sajid Mushtaq who returned with MRCPath in Histopathology from London. His other team members consisted of Col (now Brigadier retired) Amir Hussain, Lt Col (now Major General retired) Masood Anwar, Wing Commander Iftikhar ul Hassan Abidi and Major (now Major General) Mohammad Amin Wiqar.

During his days, emphasis was laid upon structured training, evening classes and seminars and conferences. The Lymphoma project which was already started, gave a new vigour and activity as the funds were diverted to hire the services of many more doctors, technical and secretarial staff. The institute was asked by other societies like Pakistan Society of gastroenterology and GI Endoscopy to organize the international conference. A faculty of overseas experts was established. Internationally renowned experts like Prof Maurice Longson (of Manchester University), Prof JE Banatavala of St Thomas’ Hospital, London and Prof Morag C Timbury, Director Central Public Health Laboratory, Colindale, London visited and delivered the lectures in the institute. The AFIP revived its ties with the Royal College of Pathologist, London. The officers were encouraged to attained international conferences and present their papers. Much emphasis was also diverted towards paper writing and compilation of the professional books and booklets.

=== 1992 ===
Maj Gen Manzoor Ahmad was the first pathologist, who was appointed as the Surgeon General Pakistan Army and was promoted to the rank of Lieutenant General, in 1992. Maj General Iftikhar Ahmad Malik was appointed the Commandant of AFIP. He had long worked as a pathologist. He had been in Saudi Arabia and then Professor of Pathology at Army Medical College Rawalpindi. He was also Chairman Pakistan Medical Research Council and actively involved in the activities of the College of Physicians and Surgeons, Pakistan. He brought new dimension to Pathology training and practice. He was disciplined, to the point and expected a high standard of work and tough training. The institute was open for long hours. The research papers were written in great number and work was expanded to different fields. His tenure brought meticulousness and diligence in the unit.

The major change was brought in the Virology department. The newly constructed structure of the building was fully changed and converted into a purpose-built laboratory. The office space was created. The serum bank area, Viral serodiagnosis lab, Molecular Biology laboratory and laboratory sterilization areas were added. The department has a new shape. The expansion of the space led to mobility and freedom of work and increased the efficiency. The new gadgets, computers, telephonic connections and working areas were added in the department. During his tenure, the freedom of thoughts, acceptance of new ideas and an improvisation remained the priorities. The quick decision were made and the sudden expansion in the quality work was absorbed. The working of the LIMS was reviewed and innovations were introduced into it. The plan for the Forensic Lab was followed and the work started on it. After a long time the officers were encouraged to receive training from abroad and attend the conferences and make presentations. During his tenure, the earthquake struck the north of Pakistan and the Azad Kashmir. All laboratories and pathology service had disappeared there. He and his team played a vital role in the revival of the service, by offering the equipment, manpower and the resources from the institute. In a very little time, the services were running efficiently and smoothly.

== Organization ==
In the diagnostics side its departments include Hematology, Chemical pathology, Microbiology, Immunology, Virology, Endocrinology and Nuclear Medicine. It is usually commanded by a Major General, currently being commanded by Major General Muhammad Tahir Khadim, HI(M). He is the senior most pathologist of the Pakistan Armed Forces, consultant Histopathologic specialist. As a Major General, he has held the highest professional medical appointments in Pakistan Army such as Advisor in Pathology (Armed Forces), Professor of Pathology, Army Medical College. Presently he is serving as Commandant Armed Forces Institute of Pathology Rawalpindi.

== List of commandants ==
- Lt Col Sarup Narayan
- Col Mohammad Akram
- Lt Col Mohammad Said
- Lt Col Noor Ahmad
- Col Manzoor Ahmad Chaudhri
- Maj Gen M I Burney
- Lt Gen Syed Azhar Ahmed
- Lt Gen Manzoor Ahmad
- Maj Gen Iftikhar Ahmad Malik (Late)
- Lt Gen Mohammad Saleem (Late)
- Maj Gen Muhammad Muzaffar
- Lt Gen Karamat Ahmad Karamat
- Brig Zahur-ur Rahman
- Maj Gen Masood Anwar
- Maj Gen Mohammad Amin Wiqar
- Maj Gen Farooq Ahmad Khan
- Maj Gen Muhammad Ayyub
- Maj Gen Pervez Ahmed HI(M)
- Maj Gen Muhammad Tahir Khadim
- Maj Gen Raza Jaffar
- Maj Gen Hafeez uddin (Current)
