= British Journal of Ophthalmology =

- Discipline: Ophthalmology
- Language: English
- Edited by: Frank Larkin

Publication details
- History: 1917–present
- Publisher: BMJ Publishing Group (United Kingdom)
- Frequency: Monthly
- Impact factor: 4.5 (2025)

Standard abbreviations
- ISO 4: Br. J. Ophthalmol.

Indexing
- CODEN: BJOPAL
- ISSN: 0007-1161 (print); 1468-2079 (web)
- OCLC no.: 290631715

Links
- Journal homepage; Online access; Online archive

The British Journal of Ophthalmology is a peer-reviewed medical journal covering all aspects of ophthalmology. The journal was established in 1917 by the amalgamation of the Royal London (Moorfields) Ophthalmic Hospital Reports with the Ophthalmoscope and the Ophthalmic Record. The journal was edited for several years by Stewart Duke-Elder. Following the tenures of Jost Jonas, James Chodosh, and Keith Barton, the current Editor-in-Chief is Frank Larkin.

== Abstracting and indexing ==
The journal is abstracted and indexed in Index Medicus, PubMed, Current Contents, Excerpta Medica, and Scopus. According to the Journal Citation Reports, the journal has a 2025 impact factor of 4.5.
