= Pakistan Museum of Natural History =

- پاکستان عجائب گھر براۓ قدرتى تاريخ

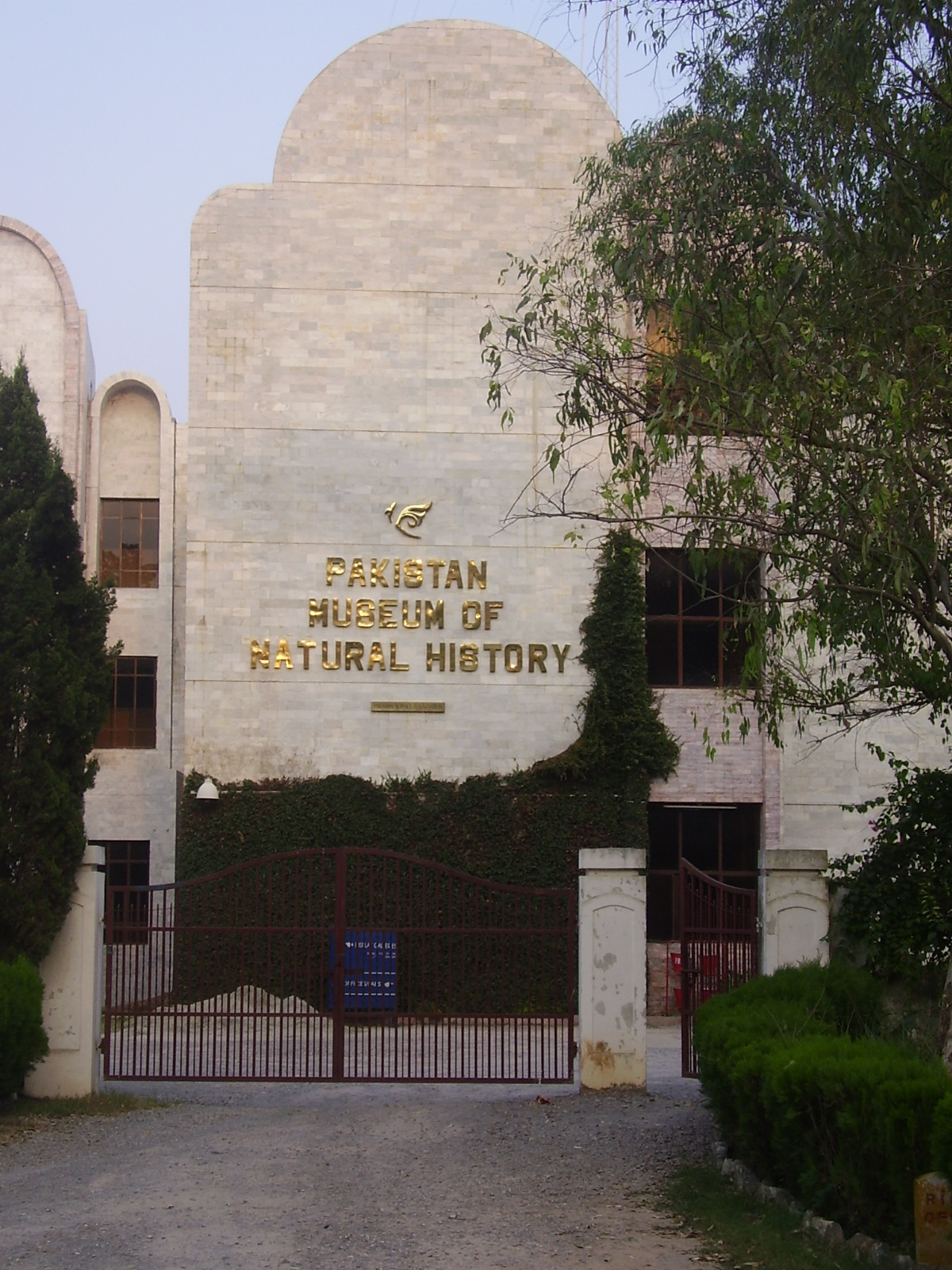
- Entrance to the museum

- Location in Islamabad Location in Pakistan
- Established: 1976; 50 years ago
- Location: Garden Avenue, Shakarparian, Islamabad, Capital Territory, Pakistan
- Coordinates: 33.686389°N 73.076389°E
- Type: Natural history museum
- Collection size: Around 1.6 million specimens (2024)
- Owner: Pakistan Science Foundation
- Website: www.pmnh.gov.pk

Pakistan Museum of Natural History (PMNH), (Urdu: عجائب خانہ جاتِ پاکستان برائے طبعی تواریخ) established in 1976, is a public natural history museum situated in Islamabad, the federal capital of Pakistan.

It has exhibits and galleries which display and provide information about the ecology, geology, and paleontology of the country. As of March 2024, the museum's collection comprised around 1.6 million specimens. The museum also acts as a research center and works closely with the Lok Virsa Museum. The museum is open to public everyday, except for Friday, from 10 am to 5 pm. The museum is managed by the Pakistan Science Foundation, under the Ministry of Science and Technology.

== Exhibits and galleries ==
- Biological gallery - displays and discusses wild flora and fauna, portrayed in their respective habitats.
- Ecological gallery - an educational section where ecological cycles, habitats and environmental problems are discussed through visuals and audios.
- Gemstones gallery - shows a variety of gems in-the-raw as well as cut and polished forms.
- Palaeontology gallery - displays fossils along with their studies. Anthropology is also discussed through paintings and writings, including a skull of Australopithecus. Wall paintings depict the pre-historic era.
- Tethys gallery - provides information about oceanology, petrology, pedology and mineralogy of Pakistan. It displays a three-dimensional diorama of seascapes as well as a skeleton of a whale. Different aspects of the Salt Range are also studied in detail.
- Virtual Orientation Gallery - it allows visitors to take virtual tours of all the above galleries without actually walking around the entire museum. This new gallery was introduced in 2016.

== Director Generals ==
- Dr. Saima Huma Tanveer- Director General of the Museum in 2021

== Events ==
PMNH acquired a large whale shark which landed at Karachi Fish Harbour in 2012, according to PMNH. This whale shark had a length of about 40 feet (12 m) and weighed 16 tonnes. Its liver weighed about 800 kg (1,800 lb), the stomach was about 600 kg (1,300 lb), and the ovary had a weight of 120 kg (260 lb) and had about 1500 eggs. The shark was seen on February 6, 2012, in the Gora Bari area, in the Pakistani territory of the Arabian Sea, by local fishermen. According to them, it was alive at that time but died before they started hauling it towards the sea shore. The fish was brought to Karachi Fish Harbour on February 7, 2012, and auctioned for Rs. 200,000. The Museum bought this shark and mounted it as a dried specimen. However, due to the lack of professional taxidermy skills and poor maintenance, the specimen is perishing quickly, despite being repainted and repaired several times.

== See also ==
- Natural history of Indian sub-continent
- Wildlife of Pakistan
- Lok Virsa Museum
- List of museums in Pakistan
