= National Institute of Health, Islamabad =

Pakistani Health Institute

- Founder: Wajid Ali Khan Burki
- Established: 18 June 1965; 60 years ago
- Key people: Executive Director; Major General Dr. Aamer Ikram, SI(M)
- Formerly called: National Health Laboratories
- Location: Islamabad
- Website: nih.org.pk

The National Institute of Health, Islamabad (NIH) (Urdu: قومی ادارہَ صحت), is a Pakistani research institute located in Islamabad, Pakistan.

The institute is an autonomous body of Ministry of National Health Services, Regulation and Coordination, mainly responsible for biomedical and health related research along with vaccine manufacturing.

== History ==
The National Health Laboratories was the brainchild of Health Minister Wajid Ali Khan Burki and was approved by the Government of Pakistan in 1961 at the cost of Rs. 20.5 million (equivalent to Rs. 100 million or US$370,000 in 2021).

By the end of its completion in 1965, its cost rose to Rs. 400 million (equivalent to Rs. 2.0 billion or US$7.3 million in 2021).
