= Pakistan Science Foundation =

Government institution in Pakistan

- بنیاد علوم پاکستان

Agency overview
- Formed: 1973; 53 years ago
- Jurisdiction: Pakistan
- Headquarters: Islamabad, Pakistan
- Agency executive: Prof. Dr. Shahid Mehmood Baig S.I., H.I., 'FPAS, Chairperson
- Child agencies: Pakistan Museum of Natural History; Pakistan Scientific and Technological Information Centre
- Website: www.psf.gov.pk

The Pakistan Science Foundation (PSF) (Urdu: بنیاد علوم پاکستان) is an institution under the Ministry of Science and Technology of the Government of Pakistan. It funds scientific studies, research and development. The Pakistan Science Foundation also operates and administrates the Pakistan Museum of Natural History, and the Pakistan Scientific and Technological Information Center, both in Islamabad. It was formed in 1973 through an Act of Parliament of Pakistan. As of December 2020, the Chairperson of the PSF is Prof. Dr. Shahid Mahmood Baig Hilal-i-Imtiaz, Sitar-e-Imtiaz.
