= Ministry of Science and Technology (Pakistan) =

Government ministry of Pakistan

- وزارتِ علم و فنیات

Agency overview
- Formed: 1972; 54 years ago
- Jurisdiction: Government of Pakistan
- Headquarters: Islamabad, Pakistan
- Minister responsible: K. Hussain Magsi, Minister for Science and Technology
- Agency executive: Sajid Baloch, Federal Secretary
- Website: most.gov.pk

The Ministry of Science and Technology (Urdu: وزارتِ علم و فنیات, as MoST) is a Cabinet-level Ministry of the Government of Pakistan concerned with Science and Technology in Pakistan and in general, Pakistan's science policy, planning, coordination and directing of efforts to initiate and launch scientific and technological programs as well as projects aimed at economic development.

The ministry is coordinated by the Federal Minister for Science and Technology who is currently Agha Hassan Baloch and is headquartered in Islamabad.

== Mission ==
To achieve the security, prosperity and social cohesion of Pakistan through equitable and sustainable socio-economic progress using science, technology and innovation as central pillars of development in all sectors of economic activity.

The principle agenda of the MoST is building Pakistan's technological competence in the 21st century by leap forging into new markets, develop a larger pool of human resource for reverse brain drain and integrate the soft technology infrastructure into hard modern technological base, strengthen technology institutions, effective S & TR governance and enhance the capacity if indigenous innovation systems.

== Federal Ministers/Ministers of State/Advisers/In-charge, Ministry of Science and Technology ==
The Scientific and Technological Research Division (S&TRD) established in 1960 was initially responsible to administer the National Science Council, the Council of Scientific and Industrial Research, the Atomic Energy Commission and the Space and Upper Atmospheric Research Committee. The status of S&TR Division was raised to the level of full-fledged Ministry of Science and Technology “MoST” in 1972.

List of Federal Ministers, Ministers of State and Advisers to the PM
No.	Name	Took office	Left office	Tenure	Note(s)						
No.	Name	Took office	Left office	Tenure	Note(s)	1	Habibur Rehman	17 February 1960	17 April 1961	1 year, 59 days	Federal Minister for Education, Re-designated as Minister of Education & Scientific Research
2	Akhtar Husain	17 April 1961	1 March 1962	318 days	Federal Minister for Education & Scientific Research						
3	Lieutenant General WA Burki	2 March 1962	8 June 1962	98 days	Federal Minister for Education & Scientific Research						
4	Ghulam Faruque	1 January 1966	15 July 1967	1 year, 195 days	Federal Minister for Scientific and Technological Research						
5	Vice Admiral S.M. Ahsan	5 April 1969	6 May 1969	31 days	Incharge M/o Scientific & Technological Research						
6	Air Marshal Nur Khan	7 May 1969	3 August 1969	88 days	Incharge Scientific & Technological Research						
7	Muhammad Shamsul Huq	4 August 1969	22 February 1971	1 year, 202 days	Federal Minister for Education and Scientific Research						
8	Khurshid Hasan Meer	17 August 1973	22 October 1974	1 year, 66 days	Minister without portfolio (looked after work of the Ministry) Federal Minister for Science and Technology						
9	Abdul Hafeez Pirzada	22 October 1974	5 February 1976	1 year, 106 days	Federal Minister for Education, Science and Technology and Provincial Coordination						
10	Hafeezullah Cheema	22 October 1974	9 January 1975	79 days	Minister of State for Science and Technology						
11	Saeed-ur-Rashid Abbasi	10 January 1975	5 February 1976	1 year, 26 days	Minister of State for Science and Technology						
12	Malik Muhammad Jaffer	5 February 1976	24 January 1977	354 days	Minister of State for Science and Technology						
13	Niaz Muhammad Wassan	30 March 1977	5 July 1977	97 days	Federal Minister for Science and Technology						
14	Mohammad Arshad Chaudhri	27 August 1978	21 April 1979	237 days	Federal Minister for Science and Technology						
15	Hamid Nasir Chattha	28 January 1986	31 May 1986	123 days	Federal Minister for Science and Technology						
16	Mir Haji Tareen	28 September 1986	20 December 1986	83 days	Federal Minister for Science and Technology						
17	Malik Muhammad Naeem Khan	15 May 1988	29 May 1988	14 days	Federal Minister for Science and Technology						
18	Chaudhary Nisar Ali Khan	9 June 1988	1 December 1988	175 days	Federal Minister for Science and Technology						
19	Jehangir Bader	4 December 1988	20 September 1989	290 days	Federal Minister for Science and Technology						
20	Javed Jabbar	20 September 1989	6 August 1990	320 days	Federal Minister for Science and Technology						
21	Hazar Khan Bijarani	13 August 1990	6 November 1990	85 days	Federal Minister for Science and Technology (Caretaker Government)						
22	Hamid Nasir Chattha	9 November 1990	10 September 1991	305 days	Federal Minister for Science and Technology						
23	Mian Muhammad Zaman	9 June 1991	18 July 1993	2 years, 39 days	Minister of State for Science and Technology						
24	Elahi Bux Soomro	10 September 1991	9 June 1993	1 year, 272 days	Federal Minister for Science and Technology						
25	Mohammad Shafiq	23 July 1993	19 October 1993	88 days	Federal Minister for Science and Technology						
26	Mohammad Nawaz Khokhar	31 July 1996	5 November 1996	97 days	Federal Minister for Science and Technology						
27	Abida Hussain	5 November 1996	15 December 1996	40 days	Federal Minister for Science and Technology (Caretaker Government)						
28	Atta-ur-Rahman (chemist)	14 March 2000	23 November 2002	2 years, 254 days	Federal Minister for Science and Technology						
29	Atta-ur-Rahman (chemist)	24 November 2002	25 August 2004	1 year, 275 days	Adviser to Prime Minister of Pakistan Zafarullah Khan Jamali						
30	Nouraiz Shakoor	3 September 2004	15 November 2007	3 years, 73 days	Federal Minister for Science and Technology						
31	Shamsh Kassim-Lakha	16 November 2007	24 March 2008	129 days	Federal Minister for Science and Technology (Caretaker Government)						
32	Tehmina Daultana	31 March 2008	12 May 2008	42 days	Federal Minister for Science and Technology						
33	Azam Khan Swati	29 January 2009	14 December 2010	1 year, 319 days	Federal Minister for Science and Technology						
34	Aftab Hussain Shah Jillani	14 December 2010	12 February 2011	60 days	Federal Minister for Science and Technology						
35	Mir Changez Khan Jamali	12 February 2011	16 March 2013	2 years, 32 days	Federal Minister for Science and Technology						
36	Sania Nishtar	4 April 2013	5 June 2013	62 days	Federal Minister for Science and Technology (Caretaker Government)						
37	Khurram Dastgir Khan	7 June 2013	22 June 2013	15 days	Minister of State for Science and Technology						
38	Zahid Hamid	22 June 2013	21 November 2014	1 year, 152 days	Federal Minister for Science and Technology						
39	Rana Tanveer Hussain	17 December 2014	28 July 2017	2 years, 223 days	Federal Minister for Science and Technology						
40	Mir Dostain Khan Domki	15 September 2017	24 November 2017	70 days	Minister of State for Science and Technology						
41	Rana Tanveer Hussain	24 November 2017	31 May 2018	188 days	Federal Minister for Science and Technology						
42	Muhammad Yusuf Shaikh	6 June 2018	18 August 2018	73 days	Federal Minister for Science and Technology (Caretaker Government)						
43	Azam Swati	5 October 2018	6 December 2018	62 days	Federal Minister for Science and Technology						
44	Fawad Chaudhry	19 April 2019	18 April 2021	1 year, 364 days	Federal Minister for Science and Technology						
45	Shibli Faraz	19 April 2021	10 April 2022	356 days	Federal Minister for Science and Technology						
46	Agha Hassan Baloch	22 April 2022	10 August 2023	1 year, 109 days	Federal Minister for Science and Technology						
47	Umar Saif	18 August 2023	4 March 2024	199 days	Federal Minister for Science and Technology (Caretaker Government)						
48	Khalid Maqbool Siddiqui	18 March 2024	24 April 2025	2 years, 234 days	Federal Minister for Science and Technology						

== Organizations ==
The following organizations are situated under the Ministry of Science and Technology:-

- National University of Sciences and Technology, Pakistan (NUST)
- COMSATS University Islamabad (CUI)
- Council for Work and Housing Research (CWHR)
- National Institute of Electronics (NIE)
- National Institute of Oceanography (Pakistan) (NIO)
- National University of Technology (NUTECH)
- Pakistan Council for Renewable Energy Technologies (PCRET)
- Pakistan Council of Research in Water Resources (PCRWR)
- Pakistan Council for Science and Technology (PCST)
- Pakistan Council of Scientific and Industrial Research (PCSIR)
- Pakistan Engineering Council (PEC)
- Pakistan National Accreditation Council (PNAC)
- Pakistan Science Foundation (PSF)
  - Pakistan Museum of Natural History (PMNH)
  - Pakistan Scientific and Technological Information Center (PASTIC)
- Pakistan Standards and Quality Control Authority (PSQCA)
- National Metrology Institute of Pakistan (NMIP)
- Pakistan Halal Authority (PHA)
- STEDEC Technology Commercialization Corporation of Pakistan (Private) limited

== PakMoonSighting.pk ==
Moon Sighting Pakistan
- Website type: Lunar observation
- Available in: English
- Owner: Government of Pakistan
- Creators: Ministry of Science and Technology
- Website: pakmoonsighting.pk
- Launched: 26 May 2019; 7 years ago

The ministry launched a lunar observatory website in 2019 aimed at to show the citizens about the Islamic events, holidays, and primarily crescent associated with lunar calendar dates. The website claims to have modern features such as predetermine the future-dates or arrival of Ramadan, Eid al-Fitr, Eid al-Adha and other events based on scientific evidences and observations through moon sighting.

== See also ==
- Government of Pakistan
- Politics of Pakistan
- Ministry of Maritime Affairs (Pakistan)
