= History of Afghanistan–Pakistan relations =

History of Afghanistan

Afghanistan and Pakistan have a significant history of conflict owing to their border dispute regarding the Durand Line.

== Pre-partition era ==
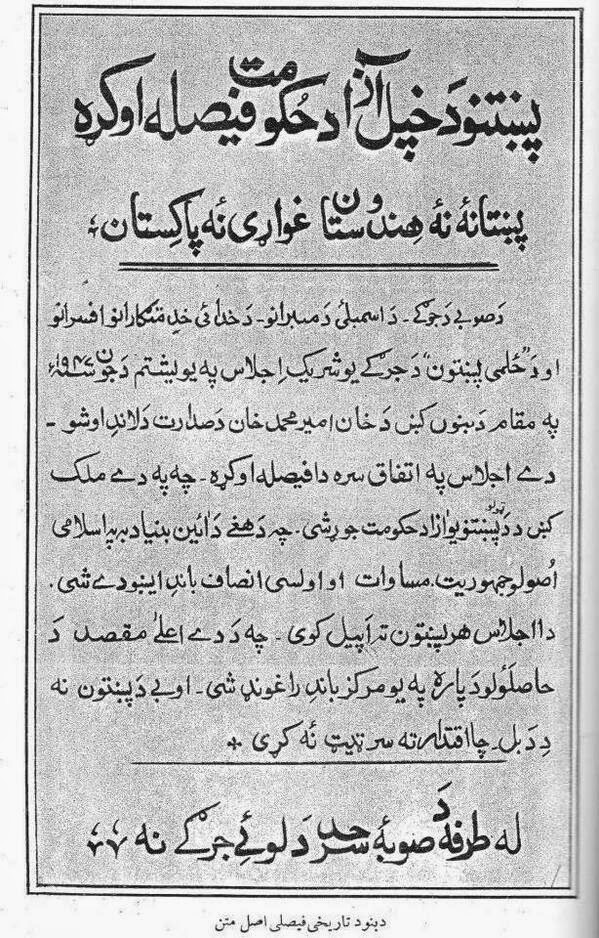
The Pashtunistan Declaration written after a unified agreement in a Loya Jirga, Bannu

The Bannu Resolution (Pashto: د بنو فیصله), or the Pashtunistan Resolution (Pashto: د پښتونستان قرارداد), was a formal political statement adopted by Pashtun tribesmen who had wanted an independent Pashtun state on 21 June 1947 in Bannu in the North-West Frontier Province (NEFP) of British India (in present-day Khyber Pakhtunkhwa, Pakistan). The resolution demanded the British to offer the option of independence for Pashtunistan, comprising all Pashtun territories in British India, rather than choosing between the independent dominions of India and Pakistan.

The British, however, declined the demand and the NWFP was joined with Pakistan on basis of the result of July 1947 NWFP Referendum. In response, the then Chief Minister of NWFP Khan Abdul Jabbar Khan (Dr Khan Sahib), his younger brother Khan Abdul Ghaffarar Khan (Bacha Khan) and the Khudai Khidmatgars, as well as some Pashtun tribes of NWFP boycotted the referendum, citing that it did not offer the options of the NWFP becoming independent or joining Afghanistan.

== Afghanistan's hostile relations with the newly independent Pakistan ==
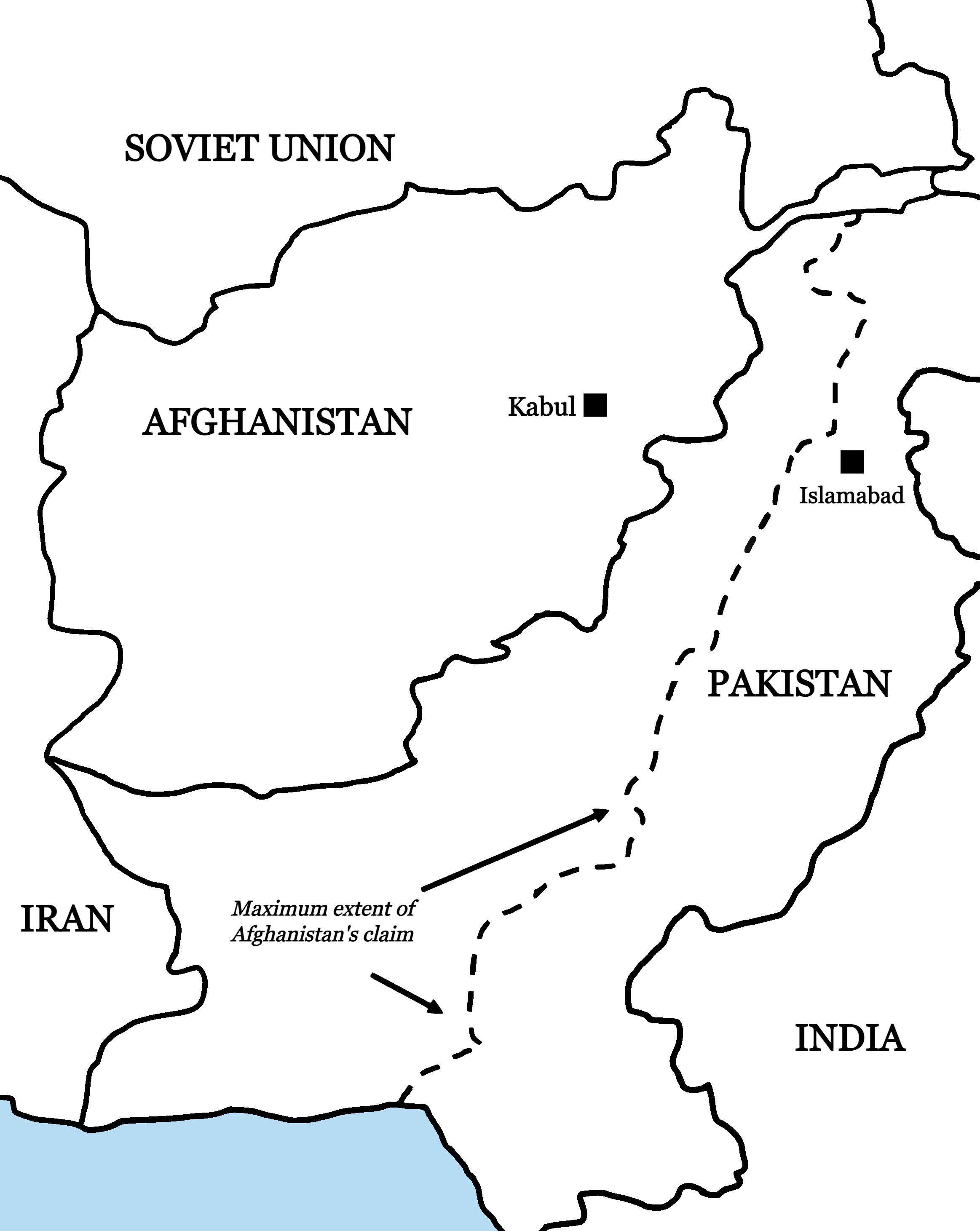
Afghanistan's territorial claims against Pakistan

Pakistan inherited the Durand Line agreement after its independence in 1947 but there has never been a formal agreement or ratification between Islamabad and Kabul. The Afghan government has not formally accepted the Durand Line as the international border between the two states, claiming that the Durand Line Agreement has been void in the past. This complicated issue is very sensitive to both the countries. The Afghan government worried that if it ever ratified the agreement, it would've permanently divided the 50 million Pashtuns and thus create a backlash in Afghanistan. Pakistan felt that the border issue had been resolved before its birth in 1947. This unmanageable border has always served as the main trade route between Afghanistan and the South Asia, especially for supplies into Afghanistan.

Shortly after Pakistan gained independence in 1947, Afghanistan crafted a two-fold strategy to destabilize the frontier regions of Pakistan, in an attempt to take advantage of Pakistan's post-independence instability. Firstly, it strongly aligned itself with Pakistan's rival, India, and also the USSR. Secondly, it politically and financially backed secessionist politicians in the Khyber Pakhtunkhwa in the 1960s. In January 1950, the Afghan king, Mohammed Zahir Shah, had an anti-Pakistan speech which was condemned by Pakistan's Liaquat Ali Khan. A serious incident took place on September 30, 1950, when Pakistan claimed Afghan troops had crossed into their territory near the Bogra Pass as a low-scale invasion. The Afghan government denied involvement, saying they were pro-Pashtunistan tribesmen. Zahir Shah mentioned in a 1952 speech the friendly feelings towards Pakistan, but that the Pashtunistan issue cannot be ignored. The 1954 military pact between Pakistan and the United States concerned Afghanistan and India, and it brought Afghanistan closer to the Soviet Union but whilst maintaining non-alignment.

The Afghan government denounced the merger of West Pakistan provinces, and on March 30, 1955, Afghan demonstrators attacked the Pakistani embassy and consulates in Kabul, Kandahar and Jalalabad. Pakistan retaliated by closing the border, an economic blockage. Diplomatic relations were restored in September. Again due to the Pashtunistan issue, the two countries accused each other of border mispractices in 1961. In August, the consulates in both countries closed and relations were broken in September 1961. The situation wasn't defused until 1965.

Afghanistan's policies placed a severe strain upon Pakistan–Afghan relations in the 1960s, up until the 1970s, when the Pashtunistan movement largely subsided as the population came to identify with Pakistan. The Pashtun assimilation into the Pakistani state followed years of rising Pashtun influence in Pakistani politics and the nation's bureaucracy, culminating in Ayub Khan, Yahya Khan, Ishaq Khan – all Pashtuns, attaining leadership of Pakistan. The largest nationalist party of the time, the Awami National Party (ANP), dropped its secessionist agenda and embraced the Pakistani state, leaving only a small Pakhtunkhwa Millat Party to champion the cause of independence in relation to both Pakistan and Afghanistan. Despite the weaknesses of the early secessionist movement, this period in history continues to negatively influence Pakistan-Afghanistan relations in the 21st century, in addition to the province's politics.

=== Confederation proposal ===
In order to solve the disputes, mainly centered around the borders issue with the Durand line, Khurshid Mahmud Kasuri, a veteran diplomat who served as the Minister of Foreign Affairs of Pakistan (2002–2007), says that "at one time serious efforts were made at government level for an Afg–Pak Confederation", precising that these initiatives were taken during the time of President Mohammed Daoud Khan, generally considered to be anti-Pakistan for his galvanization of the Pashtunistan issue. Aslam Khattak, a politician who also served as an ambassador to Afghanistan, talked about this process in his book A Pathan Odyssey, and says that Prime Minister Malik Firoz Khan Noon and President Iskandar Mirza both agreed with the plans, the former also agreeing to take King Zahir Shah "as the constitutional Head of State", proclaiming that "after all, for some time after independence, we had a Christian Queen (Elizabeth II). Now, we would have a Muslim man!’." As per Kasuri, the United States supported the idea as well. He blames the failure of the project to the assassination of Daud Khan and the advent, in 1978, of the pro-Soviet PDPA party and Nur Muhammad Taraki.

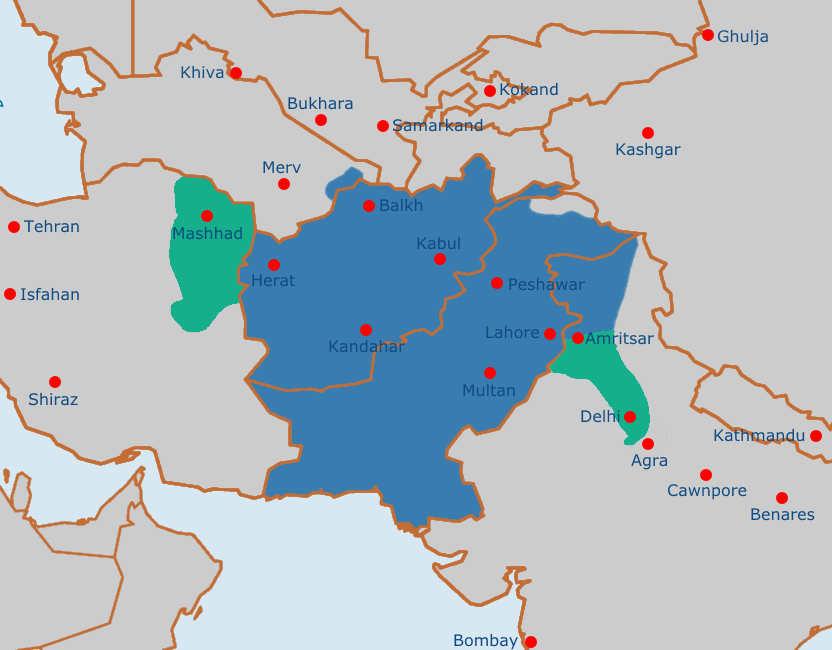
The Durrani Empire at its maximum extent under Ahmad Shah Abdali.

Afghan scholar Hafizullah Emadi says that "the initial blueprint suggested that both sides would maintain their internal autonomy, but in the matter of defense, foreign policy, foreign trade and communication, there would be a central government. The prime minister would be by rotation." He also explains the failure of the proposition : Iskandar Mirza was replaced by General Ayub Khan, after a coup d'état in 1958, an ethnic Pashtun who "regarded himself as the leader of the Pashtuns in Pakistan, and believed that the Pashtuns in Afghanistan should join Pakistan under his leadership" instead of a confederation. Zulfiqar Ali Bhutto rejected the idea because "an economically underdeveloped Afghanistan would not benefit Pakistan." In his diaries, in an observation dated to 9 January 1967, Ayub Khan noted that "it is people from the Punjab like Feroz Khan Noon and Amjad Ali who keep on emphasizing to me the need to make up with Afghanistan."

President Zia-ul-Haq too was for such confederation. "Charles Wilson recalled a map that Zia had also shown to him in which overlay indicated the goal of a confederation embracing first Pakistan and Afghanistan and eventually Central Asia and Kashmir. Zia further explained about the Pakistan-Afghanistan confederation in which Pakistanis and Afghans could travel freely back and forth without passports." General Akhtar Abdur Rahman, considered Zia's right-hand man and more importantly the DG-ISI (1979–1987), himself a Pashtun, "also shared Zia’s vision of a post-Soviet "Islamic Confederation" composed of Pakistan, Afghanistan, Kashmir and even the states of Soviet Central Asia."

Even more than a confederation, recently declassified CIA documents point out that, in 1954, the Afghan government approached the US in order to have a merger with Pakistan, being threatened by the Soviet Union's economic envelopment. Pakistan's then Prime Minister Mohammad Ali Bogra was skeptical of a total merger, but the idea of a confederation in itself, on the other hand, was already floating around, as "the CIA report hinted that there had been some talk in Afghan and Pakistani official circles of some sort of confederation."

Some analysts have noted that present-day Pakistan and Afghanistan have already been amalgamated into a single geographical unit during the Durrani Empire (1747–1826). For instance, scholar Muhammad Shamsuddin Siddiqi says that "Ahmed Shah's empire with its power base in Kandahar, and later transferred to Kabul, incorporated Kashmir, Punjab, Sind and Baluchistan" and thus "the Durrani empire bears the closest resemblance to Pakistan", while others have noted that "since the Durrani Empire included the present-day Pakistan and Afghanistan, the forces of history, the principle of national self-determination, and the aspiration for the unity of Muslim Ummah have all come into line", explaining the interconnected geopolitics of both countries, its latest example being the AfPak doctrine, theorized under the Obama administration from 2008 onward, concluding that Afghanistan and Pakistan should be the aim of common security policies considering their similarities.

=== During the Soviet-Afghan War ===
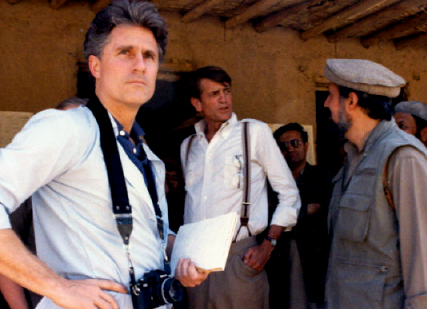
George Crile III and Charlie Wilson (Texas politician) with an unnamed political personality in the background (person wearing the aviator glasses looking at the photo camera). They were the main players in Operation Cyclone, the code name for the United States Central Intelligence Agency program to arm and finance the multi-national mujahideen during the Soviet–Afghan War, 1979 to 1989.

Relations between Afghanistan and Pakistan began deteriorating again in the 1970s when Afghanistan hosted Pashtun-Baluch militants operating against Pakistan under the leadership of National Awami Party led by Abdul Wali Khan and in retaliation Pakistan started supporting Islamist movements against the progressive and Soviet-influenced Afghan government of Mohammed Daoud Khan, and encouraged the Islamists to rise up against the government. The figures included Gulbuddin Hekmatyar and Ahmad Shah Massoud-both members of the Jamiat-e Islami students' political society- and the Haqqanis. In April 1978, Afghan President Daoud Khan was assassinated in Kabul during the self-declared Marxist Saur Revolution. This was followed by the execution of deposed Pakistani Prime Minister Zulfikar Ali Bhutto in April 1979 and the assassination of Afghan leader Nur Muhammad Taraki in September 1979. After the Soviet invasion of Afghanistan in December 1979, the United States joined Pakistan to counter Soviet influence and advance its own interests in the region. In turn, Afghan, Indian and Soviet intelligence agencies played their role by supporting al-Zulfikar – a Pakistani leftist terrorist group responsible for the March 1981 hijacking of a Pakistan International Airlines (PIA) plane. Al-Zulfiqar was a Pakistani left-wing organisation formed in 1977 by Mir Murtaza Bhutto, son of former Pakistani Prime Minister Zulfikar Ali Bhutto. Its goal was to overthrow the military regime that ousted Bhutto. After March 1981 Al-Zulfiqar claimed no further attacks. The Bhutto family and Pakistani military dictator Zia-ul-Haq shared a common enemy, as Zia was the one supporting attacks against the Afghan government.

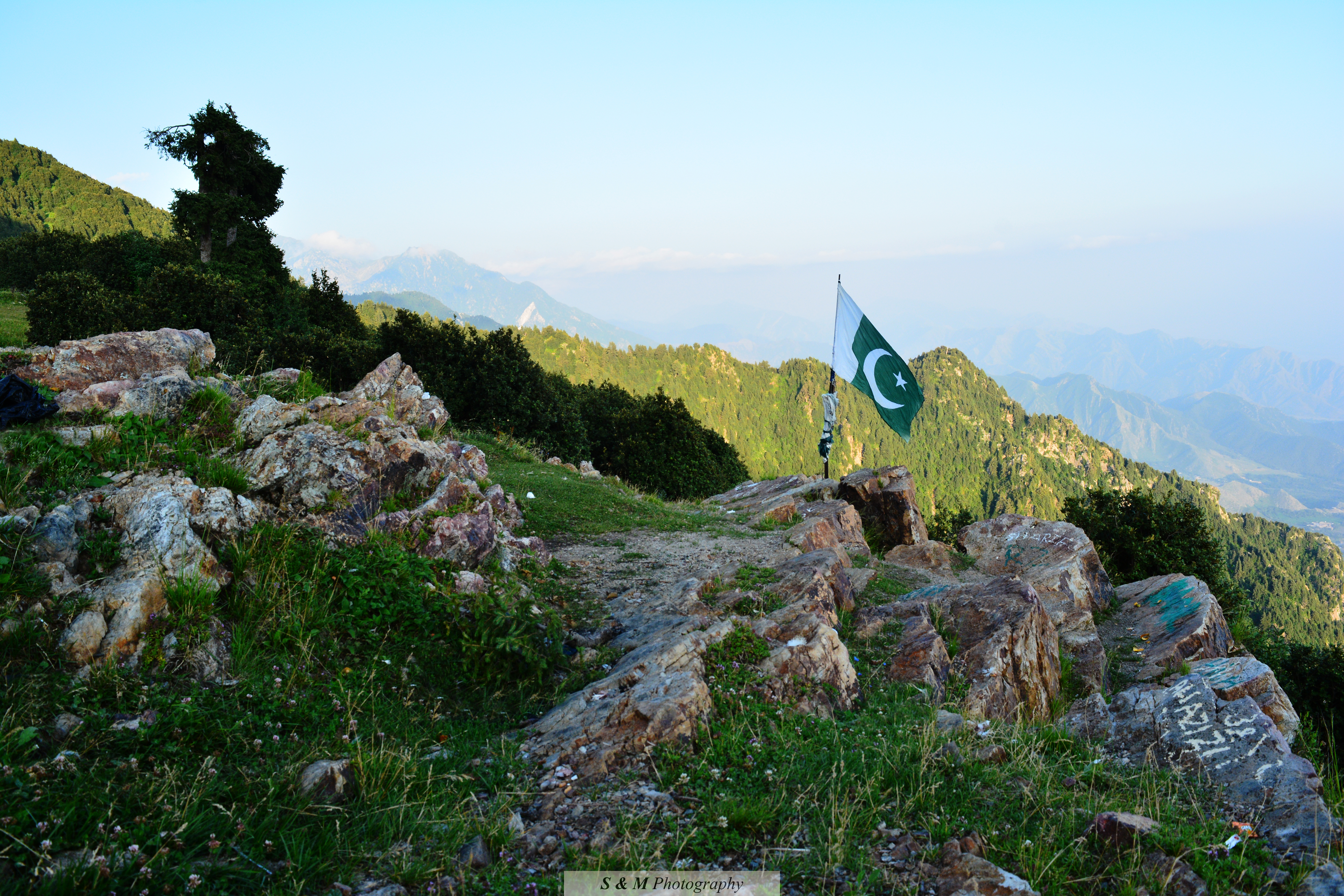
Pakistan side near the Afghanistan–Pakistan border.

During the 1980s, the Durand Line was heavily used by Afghan refugees fleeing the Soviet occupation in Afghanistan, including a large number of Mujahideen insurgent groups who crossed back and forth. Pakistan became a major training ground for roughly 250,000 foreign mujahideen fighters who began crossing into Afghanistan on a daily basis to wage war against the communist Afghanistan and the Soviet forces. The mujahideen included not only locals but also Arabs and others from over 40 different Islamic nations. Many of these foreign fighters married local women and decided to stay in Pakistan, among them were radical Muslims such those of Saudi-led Al-Qaeda and Egyptian Muslim Brotherhood as well as prisoners from Arab countries. Relations between the two countries remained hostile during the Soviet-Afghan War. Afghan leader Babrak Karmal refused to improve relations with Pakistan due to their refusal to formally recognize the PDPA government.

Following the death of Pakistani President Zia-ul-Haq in 1988, U.S. State Department blamed the WAD (a KGB created Afghan secret intelligence agency) for terrorist attacks inside Pakistan in 1987 and 1988. With funds from the international community channeled through the United Nations High Commissioner for Refugees (UNHCR), Pakistan hosted over 3 million Afghans at various refugee camps, mainly around Peshawar in Khyber Pakhtunkhwa. The United States and others provided billions of dollars in humanitarian assistance to the refugees. There were no regular schools provided for the refugees but only madrasas in which students were trained to become members of the Taliban movement. When the Soviet Union began leaving Afghanistan, during the presidency of Mohammad Najibullah, the UNHCR and the international community assisted 1.5 million Afghan refugees in returning to Afghanistan. Pakistan were also thought to have played a part in the attempted coup in 1990 against Najibullah's government.
