= Afghanistan–Pakistan Confederation =

Proposal to merge Afghanistan and Pakistan under a confederation

The Afghanistan–Pakistan Confederation (Urdu: افغانستان پاکستان کنفیڈریشن, Pashto: افغانستان – پاکستان کنفدراسیون) refers to a plan proposed between the governments of Afghanistan and Pakistan to merge both countries under a single confederation.

The plan for a confederation was started by Ayub Khan, the president of Pakistan and the Barakzai dynasty under King Zahir Shah who requested assistance from the United States, citing fears that if Pakistan ceased to exist so would Afghanistan from threats regarding the Soviet Union and India.

== History ==
Afghanistan and Pakistan had a heated relationship since the latter state’s inception due to the Pashtunistan issue by which Afghanistan laid claims to Pakistan's northwestern region. In September 1947, Afghanistan voted against Pakistan's entry into the United Nations due to the fact that NWFP became a part of Pakistan due to the 1947 North-West Frontier Province referendum, however, in October 1947 it withdrew its negative vote under the condition of merging as Afghanistan didn't like the idea of India, a country with a Hindu majority, bordering it since it would mean that Afghanistan would have continuously been in conflict with India.

== See also ==
- India–Pakistan Confederation
- Bangladesh–Pakistan Confederation
