= Bannu Resolution =

Resolution from Pashtun community to British Raj in 1947

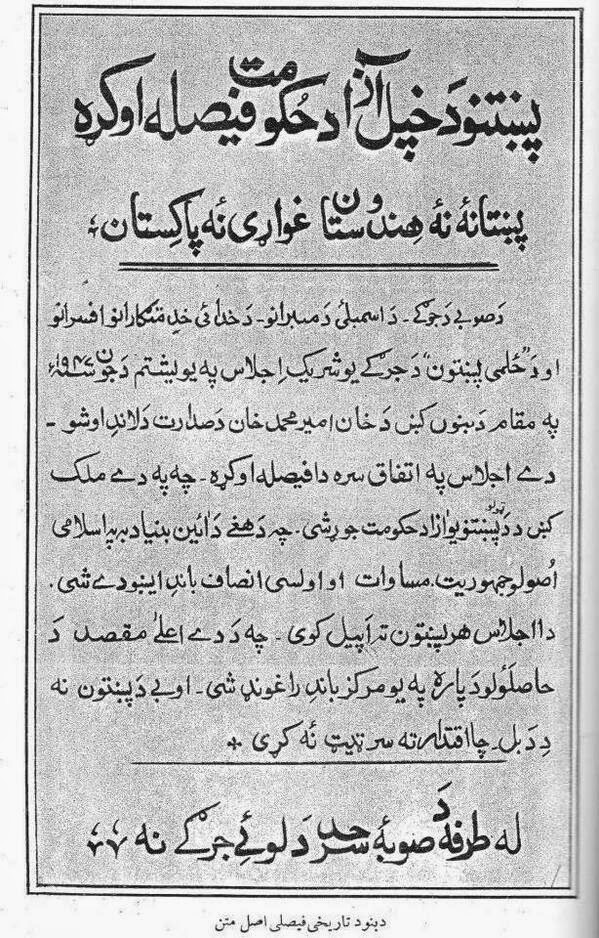
- The Pashtunistan Declaration written after a unified agreement in a Loya Jirga, Bannu
- Original title: د بنو پرېکړه
- Presented: 21 June 1947; 79 years ago
- Location: Bannu, North-West Frontier Province, British India (present-day Khyber Pakhtunkhwa, Pakistan)
- Subject: Pashtun territories in British India
- Purpose: to demand the British to add the option of independence for Pashtunistan in the 1947 NWFP referendum

The Bannu Resolution (Pashto: د بنو فیصله), or the Pashtunistan Resolution (Pashto: د پشتونستان پرېکړه), was a formal political statement adopted by Pashtun tribesmen who had wanted an independent Pashtun state on 21 June 1947 in Bannu in the North-West Frontier Province (NEFP) of British India (in present-day Khyber Pakhtunkhwa, Pakistan). The resolution demanded the British to offer the option of independence for Pashtunistan, comprising all Pashtun territories in British India, rather than choosing between the independent dominions of India and Pakistan.

The British, however, declined the demand and the NWFP was joined with Pakistan on basis of the result of July 1947 NWFP Referendum. In response, the then Chief Minister of NWFP Khan Abdul Jabbar Khan (Dr Khan Sahib), his younger brother Khan Abdul Ghaffarar Khan (Bacha Khan) and the Khudai Khidmatgars, as well as some Pashtun tribes of NWFP boycotted the referendum, citing that it did not offer the options of the NWFP becoming independent or joining Afghanistan.

== History ==
The resolution was adopted on 21 June 1947, seven weeks before the Partition of British India, by Bacha Khan, Abdul Samad Khan Achakzai, the Khudai Khidmatgars, members of the Provincial Assembly, Mirzali Khan (Faqir of Ipi), and other tribal chiefs at a loya jirga held at Bannu, in British India’s North-West Frontier Province.

The resolution demanded that Pashtuns be given a choice to have an independent state of Pashtunistan, composing all Pashtun territories of British India - an exemption from the British plan to award territories in British India to either Pakistan or India.

Flag of Pashtunistan

== British refusal ==
Under Clement Attlee, the British Raj refused to consider the resolution's demands, because in July 1947, the Parliament of the United Kingdom passed the Indian Independence Act 1947 declaring that by 15 August 1947 it would divide British India into the two new independent dominions of India and Pakistan with no option for further independent states.

The act also declared that the fate of the North West Frontier Province would be subject to the result of referendum. This was in accord with the June 3rd Plan proposal to have a referendum to decide the future of the Northwest Frontier Province—to be voted on by the same electoral college as for the Provincial Legislative Assembly in 1946.

== 1947 NWFP referendum ==
The voters voted overwhelmingly in favour of Pakistan versus India in the NWFP Referendum held in July 1947. 289,244 (99.02%) votes were cast in favour of Pakistan.

== See also ==
- Bannu
- Khudai Khidmatgar
- Pashtunistan
- Pashtun nationalism
- Durand Line
