= 1947 North-West Frontier Province referendum =

Referendum in British India

- 6–20 July 1947
- Should the North-West Frontier Province join India or Pakistan?

Results
Choice	Votes	%
Join India	2,874	0.98%
Join Pakistan	289,244	99.02%
Valid votes	292,118	100.00%
Invalid or blank votes	0	0.00%
Total votes	292,118	100.00%
Registered voters/turnout	572,798	51%
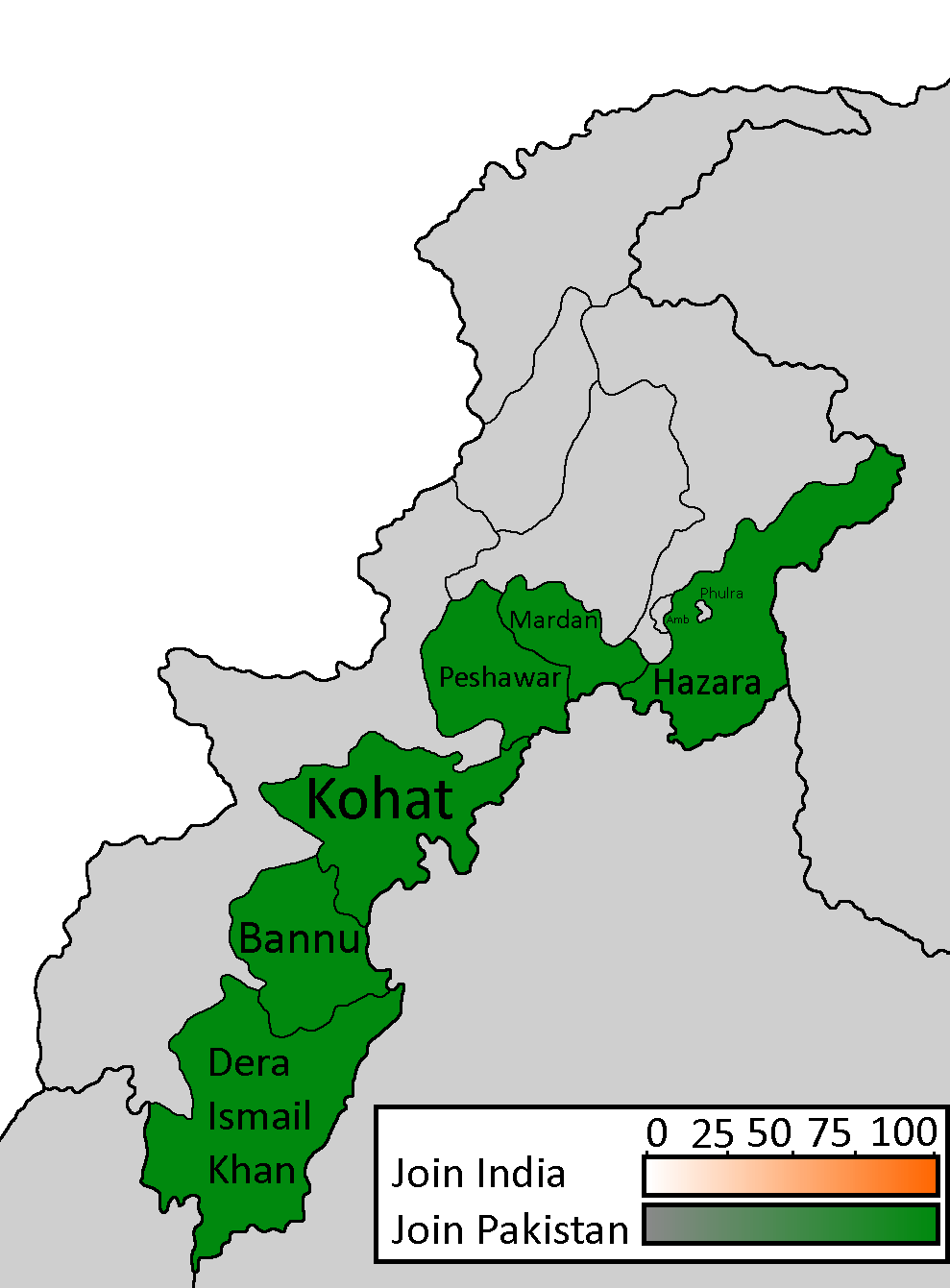
- Results by district. All six districts voted for Pakistan by an overwhelming margin of 99%

The North-West Frontier Province referendum (Pashto: د شمال لویدیځ سرحدي ایالت ټولپوښتنه) was held in July 1947 to decide whether the North-West Frontier Province of British India would join the Dominion of India or Pakistan upon the Partition of India. The polling began on 6 July and the results were made public on 20 July. Out of the total population of 4 million in the NWFP, only 572,798 were eligible to vote, of whom only 51.00% voted in the referendum. 289,244 (99.02%) of the votes were cast in favor of Pakistan and only 2,874 (0.98%) in favor of India.

The NWFP Chief Minister Khan Abdul Jabbar Khan (Dr. Khan Sahib), his brother Abdul Ghaffar Khan, and the Khudai Khidmatgars boycotted the referendum, citing that it did not have the options of the NWFP becoming independent or joining Afghanistan. Their appeal for boycott had an effect, as according to an estimate, the total turnout for the referendum was 15% lower than the total turnout in the 1946 elections.

== Background ==
On 20 February 1947, Mountbatten was charged by the British Prime Minister Clement Attlee as Viceroy and Governor-General of India to oversee the transition of power in British India to Indians, by no later than 30 June 1948. Mountbatten's instructions from the government were to avoid partition and preserve a united India as a result of the transfer of power. He was, however, authorized to adapt to a changing situation in order to get the British out promptly with minimal reputational damage. Soon after he arrived, Mountbatten concluded that the situation in India was too volatile to wait even for a year before granting independence to India. Although his advisers favored a gradual transfer of independence, Mountbatten decided the only way forward was a quick and orderly transfer of independence within 1947. In his view, any longer would mean civil war. During his visit to the North-West Frontier Province on 28–29 April 1947, Mountbatten declared that a referendum would be held to decide the future of the province. On 2 June, Mountbatten presented his famous 3rd June Plan for the partition of British India, which included a provision for the referendum in the North-West Frontier Province. The All-India Muslim League and the Indian National Congress accepted the plan, but Abdul Ghaffar Khan, his Khudai Khidmatgar movement, and the All India Azad Muslim Conference, who were opposed to partition, opposed the plan.

On 21 June, Mirzali Khan (Faqir of Ipi), Abdul Ghaffar Khan (Bacha Khan), and other Khudai Khidmatgars declared the Bannu Resolution, demanding that the Pashtuns be given a choice to have an independent state of Pashtunistan composing all Pashtun majority territories of British India, instead of being made to join the new dominions of India or Pakistan. However, the British Raj refused to comply with the demand of the Bannu Resolution and only the options for Pakistan and India were given. In response, Abdul Ghaffar Khan and his elder brother Chief Minister Dr. Khan Sahib boycotted the referendum on joining India or Pakistan, citing that it did not have the options for the province to become independent or join Afghanistan.

== Administration ==
According to a letter issued by the Indian Army General Headquarter on 18 June 1947, the following eight military officers were selected by the government to assist the Referendum Commissioner in the referendum:

1. Lt. Col. O.H. Mitchell
2. Lt. Col. V.W. Tregear
3. Lt. Col. R.W. Niva
4. Lt. Col. M.W.H. White
5. Lt. Col. G.M. Strover
6. Lt. Col. W.I. Moberley
7. Lt. Col. R.O.L.D. Byrene
8. Maj. E. de G.H. Bromhead

Some civilians were also included at the lower level of the referendum machinery under a close supervision of British Indian Army personnel.

Mountbatten instructed the NWFP acting Governor Rob Lockhart that "each side should have equal facilities in the matter of the supply of petrol." Amnesty was granted to political prisoners, except those charged with serious crimes. Mountbatten met the leaders of the All-India Muslim League and the Indian National Congress, and the following election charter was declared:

1. It is desirable that in this referendum: a). Electioneering speeches, which can only lead to bloodshed should as far as possible be avoided; and b). The issue should be clearly put before the voters.
2. To achieve these objects, it has been suggested: a). That electioneering speeches should by agreement between the parties, be banned; and b). That election posters should be prepared containing side by side and in very simple and agreed language, the issue what the two future Dominions will be and the respective advantages they have to offer to the NWFP. A map should be printed showing the areas of the two dominions.

== Result ==
Although the voter turnout was low (51.00%), 99.02% of the votes were in favor of joining Pakistan. The turnout was lowest among non-Muslims (1.16%). In the Pashtun rural constituencies, the turnout was low in the districts of Mardan (41.56%) and Peshawar (41.68%), strongholds of the Khudai Khidmatgar movement which boycotted the referendum in favor of demanding a choice to form an independent Pashtunistan or joining Afghanistan.

Constituency			Electorate	Voter turnout	Votes		Proportion of votes		Proportion of electorate	
Constituency			Electorate	Voter turnout	Join India	Join Pakistan	Join India	Join Pakistan	Join India	Join Pakistan
Muslims	Rural	Bannu	51,080	65.16%	145	33,137	0.44%	99.56%	0.28%	64.87%
Muslims	Rural	Dera Ismail Khan	45,642	64.55%	158	29,303	0.54%	99.46%	0.35%	64.20%
Muslims	Rural	Hazara	109,762	76.22%	387	83,269	0.46%	99.54%	0.35%	75.86%
Muslims	Rural	Kohat	52,020	62.14%	116	32,207	0.36%	99.64%	0.22%	61.91%
Muslims	Rural	Mardan	86,777	41.56%	1,210	34,852	3.36%	96.64%	1.39%	40.16%
Muslims	Rural	Peshawar	97,088	41.68%	568	39,902	1.40%	98.60%	0.59%	41.10%
Muslims	Urban		50,627	70.99%	262	35,680	0.73%	99.27%	0.52%	70.48%
Non-Muslims			79,802	1.16%	28	894	3.04%	96.96%	0.04%	1.12%
Pashtuns			301,527	49.99%	2,082	148,649	1.38%	98.62%	0.69%	49.30%
Total			572,798	51.00%	2,874	289,244	0.98%	99.02%	0.50%	50.50%

== Aftermath ==
The NWFP was merged into the newly created Dominion of Pakistan on 15 August 1947. The elected provincial government of Khan Abdul Jabbar Khan (Dr. Khan Sahib) was terminated on 22 August 1947 by Muhammad Ali Jinnah, the Governor-General of Pakistan. A Muslim League leader, Abdul Qayyum Khan Kashmiri, was installed as the new Chief Minister of the North-West Frontier Province on 23 August 1947. The new provincial government imprisoned the Khudai Khidmatgar movement's leader Abdul Ghaffar Khan, as well as the deposed Chief Minister Dr. Khan Sahib, and some other notable figures of the region. In July 1948, the British governor of the North-West Frontier Province, Ambrose Flux Dundas, enforced an ordinance which authorized the provincial government to detain anyone and confiscate their property without giving a reason. The Babrra massacre, in which many Khudai Khidmatgar supporters were killed, happened on 12 August 1948. In mid-September 1948, the Pakistani government banned the Khudai Khidmatgar movement, who had boycotted the 1947 NWFP referendum, and many of their supporters were arrested. The provincial government destroyed the center of the Khudai Khidmatgar movement at Sardaryab (now in Charsadda District) near Peshawar.

== See also ==
- Durand Line
- Pashtunistan
- 1947 Sylhet referendum
- 1948 Junagadh referendum
- Afghanistan–Pakistan Confederation plan
