= Pashtunistan =

Region inhabited by the Pashtun people

Pashtunistan پښتونستان
- Historical region
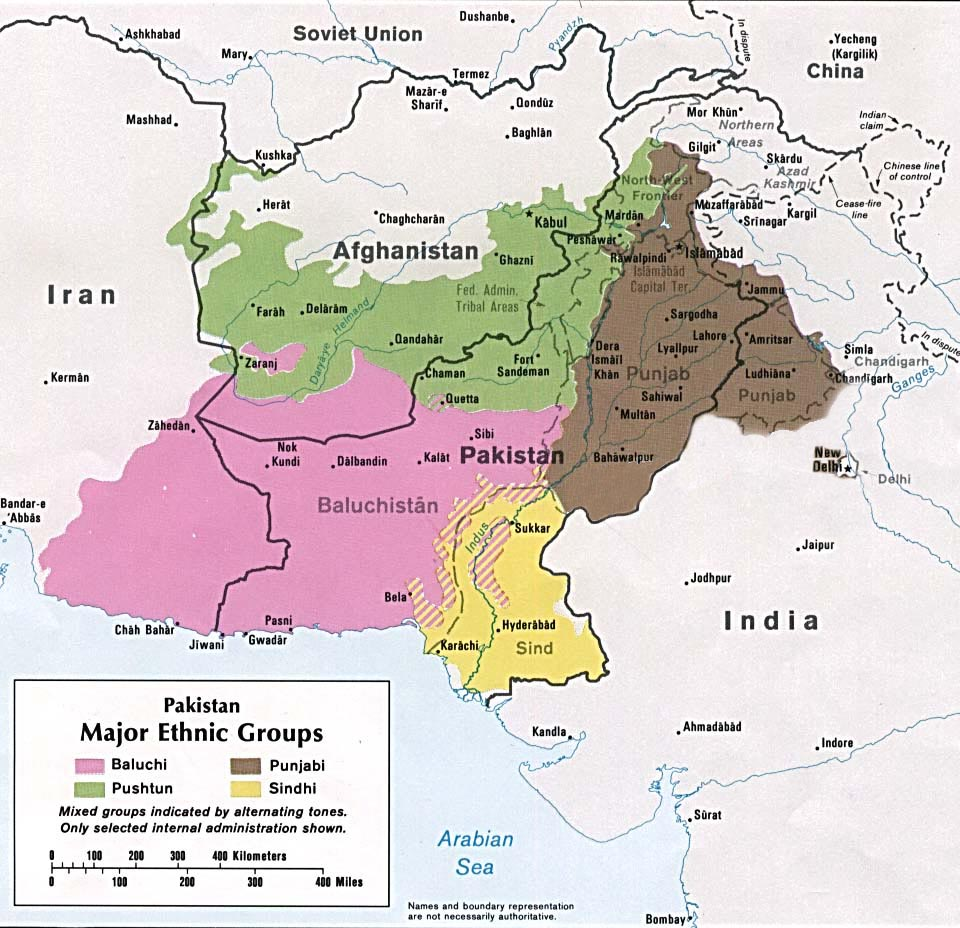
- Pashtunistan as in the Pashtun-majority areas of Pakistan and Afghanistan (in green)
- Countries: Afghanistan; Pakistan

Demographics
  - Ethnic groups: Majority: Pashtuns
  - Languages: Majority: Pashto
- Time zone: UTC+04:30 (Afghanistan); UTC+05:00 (Pakistan)
- Largest cities: Peshawar; Kabul; Quetta; Kandahar

Pashtunistan (Pashto: پښتونستان, lit. 'land of the Pashtuns') or Pakhtunistan is a historical region on the crossroads of Central and South Asia, located on the Iranian Plateau, inhabited by the Pashtun people of southern and eastern Afghanistan and northwestern Pakistan, wherein Pashtun culture, the Pashto language, and identity have been based. Alternative names historically used for the region include Pashtūnkhwā or Pakhtūnkhwā (پښتونخوا), or simply the Pashtun Belt.

During British rule in India in 1893, Mortimer Durand drew the Durand Line, fixing the limits of the spheres of influence between the Emirate of Afghanistan and British India during the Great Game and leaving about half of historical Pashtun territory under British colonial rule; after the partition of British India, the Durand Line now forms the internationally recognized border between Afghanistan and Pakistan. The traditional Pashtun homeland stretches roughly from the areas south of the Amu River in Afghanistan to the areas west of the Indus River in Pakistan; it predominantly comprises the southwestern, eastern and some northern and western districts of Afghanistan, as well as most of Khyber Pakhtunkhwa and northern Balochistan in Pakistan. The region is bordered by Punjab and Hazara (Note: historically, geographically and ethnolinguistically including the Hazara region as well) to the east, Balochistan to the south, Kohistan and Chitral to the north, and Hazarajat and Tajik-inhabited territory to the west.

The 16th-century revolutionary Ormur leader Bayazid Pir Roshan of Waziristan and the 17th-century "warrior-poet" Khushal Khan Khattak assembled Pashtun armies to fight against the Mughal Empire in the region. During this time, the eastern parts of Pashtunistan were ruled by the Mughals while the western parts were ruled by Safavid Iran. Pashtunistan first gained an autonomous status in 1709, when Mirwais Hotak successfully revolted against the Safavids in Loy Kandahar. The Pashtuns later achieved unity under the leadership of Ahmad Shah Durrani, who founded the Durrani dynasty and established the Afghan Empire in 1747. In the 19th century, however, the Afghan Empire lost large parts of its eastern territory to the Sikh Empire and later the British Empire. Many famous Indian independence activists emerged from the region including Abdul Ghaffar Khan and his anti-colonial Khudai Khidmatgar movement to free the region from British control. In 1969, the autonomous princely states of Swat, Dir, Chitral, and Amb were merged into the Pakistani NWFP. In 2018, the Pashtun-majority Federally Administered Tribal Areas, formerly a federally-controlled buffer zone of Pakistan on the international border with Afghanistan, were merged into the province of Khyber Pakhtunkhwa (previously known as the NWFP), fully integrating the region with Pakistan proper.

The Pashtuns practice Pashtunwali, the indigenous culture of the Pashtuns, and this remains significant for many Pashtuns. Although the Pashtuns are politically separated by the Durand Line between Pakistan and Afghanistan, many Pashtun tribes from the FATA area and the adjacent regions of Afghanistan, tend to ignore the border and cross back and forth with relative ease to attend weddings, family functions and take part in the joint tribal councils known as jirgas. Depending on the source, the ethnic Pashtuns constitute 42–60% of the population of Afghanistan. In neighboring Pakistan they constitute 15.4% percent of over the 241 million population, which includes the Pashtun diaspora in other Pakistani cities and provinces. (Note: Pashtuns comprise 15.4% (38,864,994) of Pakistan's total population of 252,363,571 per 2024 estimate by the World Factbook.)

== Origin of term ==
The name used for the region during the Middle Ages especially during the High Middle Ages and Late Middle Ages and up until the 20th century was Afghanistan. Afghanistan is a reference to this land by its ethnicity, which were the Afghans, while Pashtunistan is a reference to this land by its language. Mention of this land by the name of Afghanistan predates mention by the name of Pashtunistan, which has been mentioned by Ahmad Shah Durrani in his famous couplet, 14th-century Moroccan scholar Ibn Battuta, Mughal Emperor Babur, 16th-century historian Firishta and many others. While mention of Afghans have been mentioned of a community of people, chieftains of tribes of Bactria known as Abgan or Avagana (Afğân) or Bactrian: αβγανο (Abgân) the exact origin or etymology of the term is not known with some scholars believe it to have been derived with the name Asvakan (Note: Also known in various sources as Āśvakāyana, Āśvāyana, Assakenoi, Aspasioi, and Aspasii, as well as several other Prakrit, Latin and Greek variants.) who were a people living in the Swat valley's then in the regions of Bactria.

The men of Kabul and Khilj also went home; and whenever they were questioned about the Musulmans of the Kohistan (the mountains), and how matters stood there, they said, "Don't call it Kohistan, but Afghanistan; for there is nothing there but Afghans and disturbances." Thus it is clear that for this reason the people of the country call their home in their own language Afghanistan, and themselves Afghans. But it occurs to me, that when, under the rule of Muhammadan sovereigns, Musulmans first came to the city of Patna, and dwelt there, the people of India (for that reason) called them Patans—but God knows!

— Firishta, 1560–1620

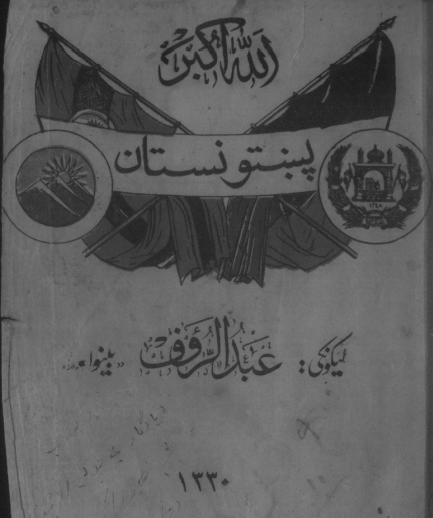
Flag of Pashtunistan and the Flag of the Kingdom of Afghanistan

The Pashto name Pakhtunistan or Pashtunistan (Pashto: پښتونستان (Naskh)) evolved originally from the Indian word "Pathanistan" (Hindustani: پٹھانستان (Nastaleeq), पठानिस्तान (Devanagari)). The concept of Pashtunistan was inspired by the term "Pakhtunkhwa". British Indian leaders, including the Khudai Khidmatgar, started using the word "Pathanistan" to refer to the region, however the word "Pashtunistan" was more popular among Pashtuns.

== The native people ==
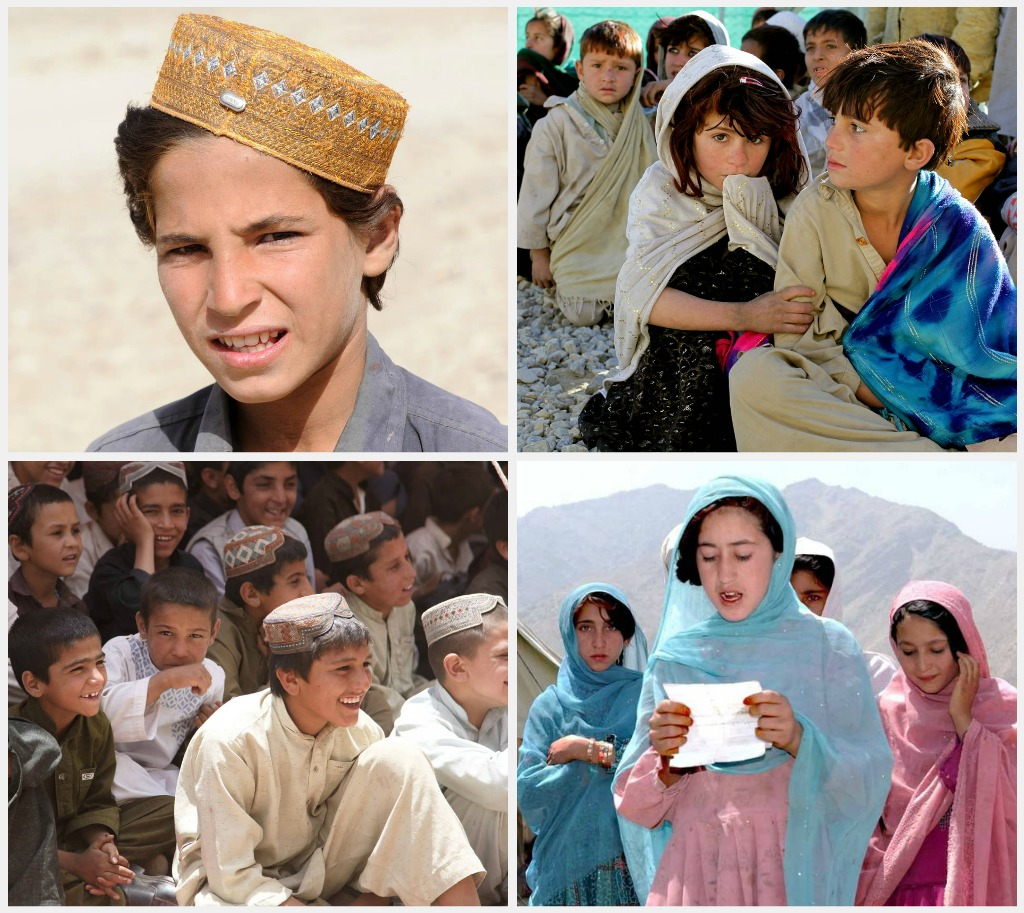
Pashtun children, indigenous to the Pashtunistan region

The native or indigenous people of Pashtunistan are the Pashtuns (also known as Pakhtuns and historically as ethnic Afghans), an Iranic ethnic group. Pashtuns are generally mixed with South Asian, Central Asian and European ethnicity. They are the largest ethnic group in Afghanistan and the second largest in Pakistan. The Pashtuns are concentrated mainly in the south and east of Afghanistan but also exist in northern and western parts of the country as a minority group. In Pakistan they are concentrated in the west and north-west, inhabiting mainly Khyber Pakhtunkhwa and northern Balochistan. In addition, communities of Pashtuns are found in other parts of Pakistan such as Sindh, Punjab, Gilgit-Baltistan and in the nation's capital, Islamabad. The main language spoken in the delineated Pashtunistan region is Pashto. Depending on the region other languages are also spoken such as Dari in Afghanistan and Gujari, Balochi, Hindko, and Urdu in Pakistan.

The Pashtuns practice Pashtunwali, the indigenous culture of the Pashtuns, and this pre-Islamic identity remains significant for many Pashtuns and is one of the factors that have kept the Pashtunistan issue alive. Although the Pashtuns are politically separated by the Durand Line between Pakistan and Afghanistan, many Pashtun tribes from the FATA area and the adjacent regions of Afghanistan, tend to ignore the border and cross back and forth with relative ease to attend weddings, family functions and take part in the joint tribal councils known as jirgas. Though this was common before the war on terror but after several military operations conducted in FATA, this cross border movement is checked via military and has become much less common in comparison to the past.

Depending on the source, the ethnic Pashtuns constitute 42–60% of the population of Afghanistan. In neighboring Pakistan they constitute 15.42 percent of the 200 million population, which does not include Pashtun diaspora in other Pakistani cities and provinces. In the Khyber Pakhtunkhwa Province of Pakistan, Pashto speakers constitute above 73 percent of the population as of 1998.

== History ==
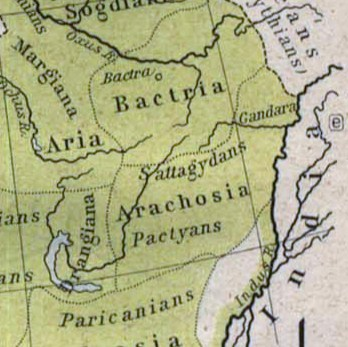
The area during 500 B.C. was recorded as Arachosia and inhabited by a people called the Pactyans.

Since the 2nd millennium BC, the region now inhabited by the native Pashtun people had been conquered by Ancient Iranian peoples, the Medes, Achaemenids, Greeks, Mauryas, Kushans, Hephthalites, Sasanians, Arab Muslims, Turks, Mughals, and others. In recent age, people of the Western world have nominally explored the area.

Arab Muslims arrived in the 7th century and began introducing Islam to the native Pashtun people. The Pashtunistan area later fell to the Turkish Ghaznavids whose main capital was at Ghazni, with Lahore serving as the second power house. The Ghaznavid Empire was then taken over by the Ghorids from today's Ghor, Afghanistan. The army of Genghis Khan arrived in the 13th century and began destroying cities in the north while the Pashtun territory was defended by the Khalji dynasty of Delhi. In the 14th and 15th century, the Timurid dynasty was in control of the nearby cities and towns, until Babur captured Kabul in 1504.

=== Delhi Sultanate and the Durrani Empire ===
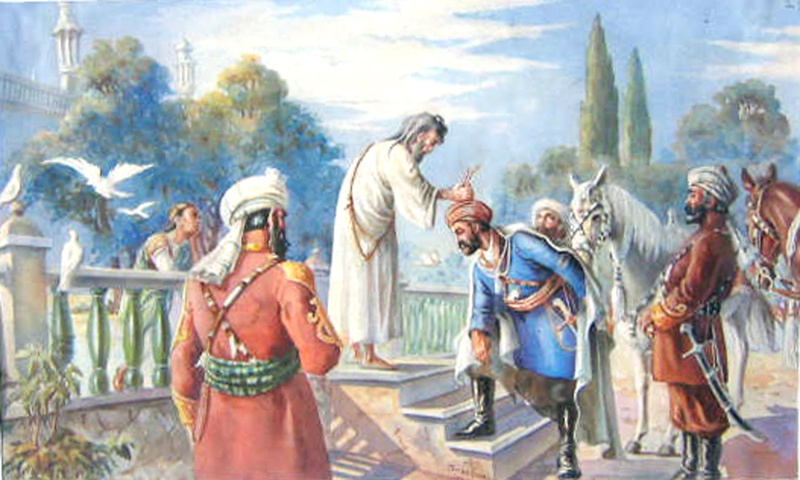
Coronation of Ahmad Shah Durrani in 1747 by a 20th-century Afghan artist, Abdul Ghafoor Breshna.

During the Delhi Sultanate era, the region was ruled by mainly Afghan and various, largely Sunni, Hanafi-jurisprudential driven Turkic dynasties from Delhi, India. An early Pashtun nationalist was the "Warrior-poet" Khushal Khan Khattak, who was imprisoned by the Mughal emperor Aurangzeb for trying to incite the Pashtuns to rebel against the rule of the Mughals. However, despite sharing a common language and believing in a common ancestry, the Pashtuns first achieved unity in the 18th century. The eastern parts of Pashtunistan were ruled by the Mughal Empire, while the western parts were ruled by the Persian Safavids as their easternmost provinces. During the early 18th century, Pashtun tribes led by Mirwais Hotak successfully revolted against the Safavids in the city of Kandahar. In a chain of events, he declared Kandahar and other parts of what is now southern Afghanistan independent. By 1738 the Mughal Empire had been crushingly defeated and their capital sacked and looted by forces of a new Iranian ruler; the military genius and commander Nader Shah. Besides Persian, Turkmen, and Caucasian forces, Nader was also accompanied by the young Ahmad Shah Durrani, and 4,000 well trained Abdali Pashtun troops from what is now Afghanistan.

After the death of Nader Shah in 1747 and the disintegration of his massive empire, Ahmad Shah Durrani created his own large and powerful Durrani Empire, which included all of modern-day Afghanistan, North east Iran, Sindh, Punjab, Baluchistan and Kashmir. The famous couplet by Ahmad Shah Durrani describes the association the people have with the regional city of Kandahar:

"Da Dili takht herauma cheh rayad kam zama da khkule Pukhtunkhwa da ghre saroona". Translation: "I forget the throne of Delhi when I recall the mountain peaks of my beautiful Pukhtunkhwa."

The last Afghan Empire was established in 1747 and united all the different Pashtun tribes as well as many other ethnic groups. Parts of the Pashtunistan region around Peshawar was invaded by Ranjit Singh and his Sikh army in the early part of the 19th century, but a few years later they were defeated by the British Raj, the new powerful empire which reached the Pashtunistan region from the east.

=== European influence ===
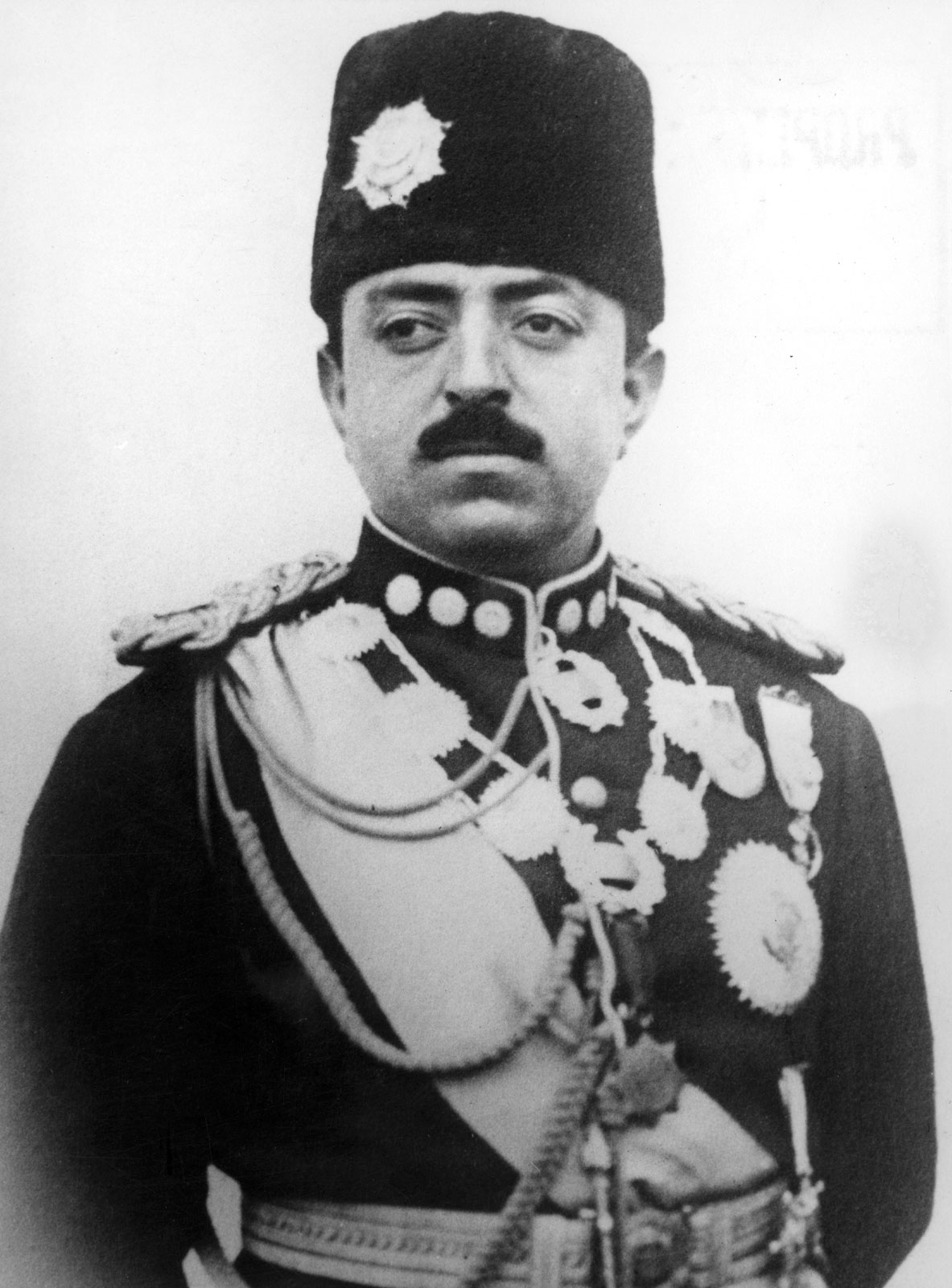
King Amanullah Khan, son of Habibullah Khan and grandson of Abdur Rahman Khan.

Following the decline of the Durrani dynasty and the establishment of the new Barakzai dynasty in Afghanistan, the Pashtun domains began to shrink as they lost control over other parts of South Asia to the British, such as the Punjab region and the Balochistan region. The Anglo-Afghan Wars were fought as part of the overall imperialistic Great Game that was waged between the Russian Empire and the British. Poor and landlocked, newly born Afghanistan was able to defend its territory and keep both sides at bay by using them against each other. In 1893, as part of a way for fixing the limit of their respective spheres of influence, the Durand Line Agreement was signed between Afghan "Iron" Amir Abdur Rahman and British Viceroy Mortimer Durand. In 1905, the North-West Frontier Province (today's Khyber Pakhtunkhwa) was created and roughly corresponded to Pashtun majority regions within the British domain. The FATA area was created to further placate the Pashtun tribesmen who never fully accepted British rule and were prone to rebellions, while the city of Peshawar was directly administered as part of a British protectorate state with full integration into the federal rule of law with the establishment of civic amenities and the construction of railway, road infrastructure as well as educational institutes to bring the region at par with the developed world.

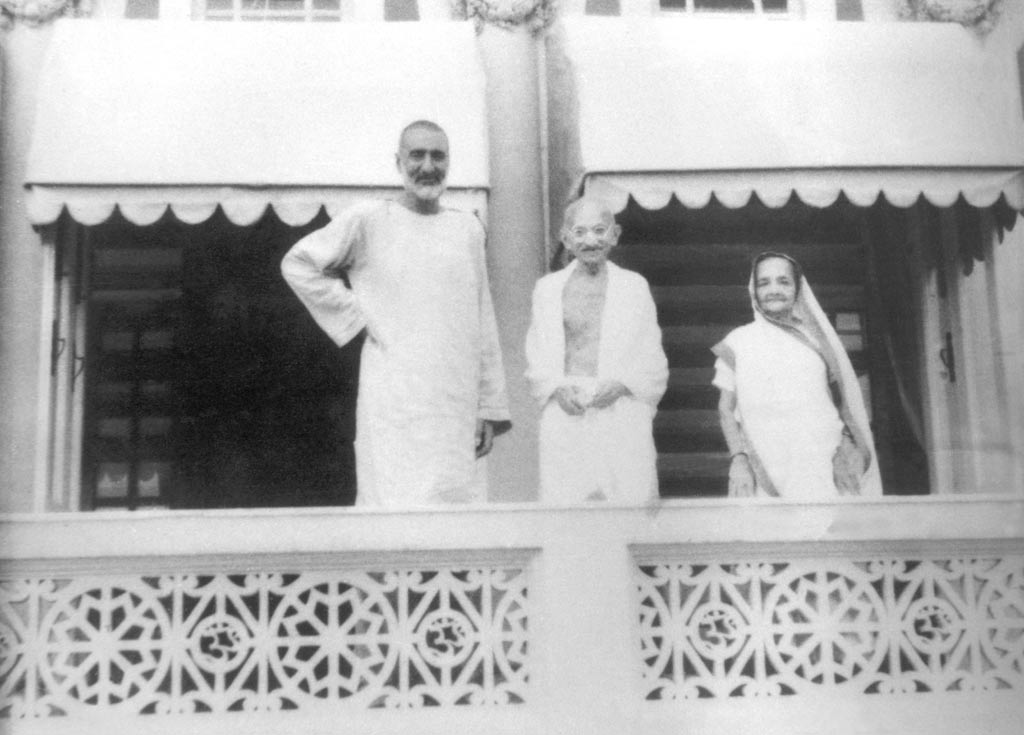
Bacha Khan (left) with Mahatma Gandhi and Kasturba Gandhi

During World War I, the Afghan government was contacted by the Ottoman Turkey and Germany, through the Niedermayer–Hentig Mission, to join the Central Allies on behalf of the Caliph in a Jihad; some revolutionaries, tribals, and Afghan leaders including a brother of the Amir named Nasrullah Khan were in favour of the delegation and wanted the Amir to declare Jihad. Kazim Bey carried a firman from the Khalifa in Persian. It was addressed to "the residents of Pashtunistan." It said that when the British were defeated, "His Majesty the Khalifa, in agreement with allied States, will acquire guarantee for independence of the united state of Pashtunistan and will provide every kind of assistance to it. Thereafter, I will not allow any interference in the country of Pashtunistan." (Ahmad Chagharzai; 1989; pp. 138–139). However the efforts failed and the Afghan Amir Habibullah Khan maintained Afghanistan's neutrality throughout World War I.

Similarly, during the 1942 Cripps Mission, and 1946 Cabinet Mission to India, the Afghan government made repeated attempts to ensure that any debate about the independence of India must include Afghanistan's role in the future of the NWFP. The British government wavered between reassuring the Afghan to the rejection of their role and insistence that NWFP was an integral part of British India.

During World War II, the government of Nazi Germany proposed an alliance with neutral Afghanistan in order to destabilize British control over the north-west of its domain in India. In return, the Afghans sought that NWFP and the Port of Karachi would be ceded to the Kingdom of Afghanistan with German military aid, so that it could gain valuable access to the Arabian Sea. Such a plan would require annexation of NWFP, Baluchistan and Sindh provinces.

The Khudai Khidmatgars (also known as the "Red Shirts") were members of a civil rights movement. Its leader Bacha Khan claimed to have been inspired by the Indian activist Mahatma Gandhi. While the Red Shirts were willing to work with the Indian National Congress from a political point of view, the Pashtuns living in the NWFP desired independence from India. However, the Bacha Khan wanted the Pashtuns areas in British India to remain part of United India instead of gaining independence.

=== Bannu Resolution ===
In June 1947, Mirzali Khan (Faqir of Ipi), Bacha Khan, and other Khudai Khidmatgars declared the Bannu Resolution, demanding that the Pashtuns be given a choice to have an independent state of Pashtunistan composing all Pashtun majority territories of British India, instead of being made to join the new state of Pakistan. However, the British Raj refused to comply with the demand of this resolution.

=== 1947 NWFP referendum ===
The NWFP joined the Dominion of Pakistan as a result of the 1947 NWFP referendum, which had been boycotted by the Khudai Khidmatgar movement, including Bacha Khan and then-chief minister Dr. Khan Sahib, as they were ditched by the leadership of Congress. About (99.02%) of the votes were cast in favor of Pakistan and only 2,874 (0.98%) in favor of India.

=== Independence of Pakistan in 1947 ===
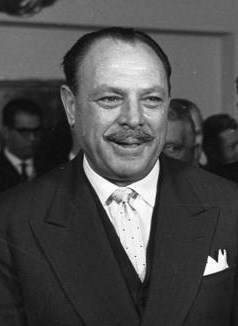
Ayub Khan, President of Pakistan from 1958 to 1969, belonged to the Pashtun Tareen tribe of Haripur and fought against Pashtun rebellions for the British Crown

The concept of Pashtunistan has varying meanings across Pakistan and Afghanistan. In Afghanistan, Pashtun nationalists look after the interests of the Pashtun ethnic group and have support only from them. They favor the ideas of Lōy Afghānistān or "Greater Afghanistan", and maintain an irredentist claim on the entire Pashtun-populated region. The Pashtunistan demand also served the cause of domestic Afghan politics, where several successive governments used the idea to strengthen "Pashtun ethnic support" for the state. This policy intensified ethno-linguistic rivalry between Pashtuns and non-Pashtuns in the country. These claims are contested in Pakistan, where Pashtun politics centers on political autonomy rather than irredentist politics.

Since the late 1940s with the dissolution of British India and independence of Pakistan, some rigid Pashtun nationalists proposed merging with Afghanistan or creating Pashtunistan as a future sovereign state for the local Pashtun inhabitants of the area. At first, Afghanistan became the only government to oppose the entry of Pakistan into the United Nations in 1947, although it was reversed a few months later. On July 26, 1949, when Afghanistan–Pakistan relations were rapidly deteriorating, a loya jirga was held in Afghanistan after a military aircraft from the Pakistan Air Force bombed a village on the Afghan side of the Durand Line. As a result of this violation, the Afghan government declared that it recognized "neither the imaginary Durand nor any similar line" and that all previous Durand Line agreements were void. Bacha Khan when took an oath of allegiance to Pakistan in 1948 in legislation assembly and during his speech he was asked by PM Liaquat Ali Khan about Pashtunistan to which he replied that it's just a name to the Pashtun province in Pakistan same like Punjab, Bengal, Sindh and Baluchishtan are the names of provinces of Pakistan as ethno-linguistic names, contrary to what he believed and strived for Pashtunistan an independent state. During the 1950s to the late 1960s, Pashtuns were promoted to higher positions within the Pakistani government and military, thereby integrating Pashtuns into the Pakistani state and severely weakening secessionist sentiments to the point that by the mid-1960s, popular support for an independent Pashtunistan had all but disappeared.

An important development in Pakistan during the Ayub period (1958–1969) was the gradual integration into Pakistani society and the military-bureaucratic establishment. It was a period of Pakistan's political history which saw a large number of ethnic Pashtuns holding high positions in the military and the bureaucracy. Ayub himself was a non-Pashto speaking ethnic Pashtun belonging to the Tarin sub-tribe of the Hazara District in the Frontier. The growing participation of Pashtuns in the Pakistani Government resulted in the erosion of the support for the Pashtunistan movement in the Province by the end of the 1960s.

— Rizwan Hussain, 2005

Afghanistan and Pashtun nationalists did not exploit Pakistan's vulnerability during the nation's 1965 and 1971 wars with India, and even backed Pakistan against a largely Hindu India. Further, had Pakistan been destabilized by India, nationalists would have had to fight against a much bigger country than Pakistan for their independence.

Sardar Daoud Khan, who was the-then prime minister of Afghanistan supported a nationalistic reunification of the Pashtuns in Pakistan with Afghanistan. He wanted Pashtun-dominated areas like Khyber Pakhtunkhwa and Baloch-dominated areas like Balochistan to become part of Afghanistan. However, his policy of reunification of Pashtuns antagonized Non-Pashtuns like Tajiks, Uzbeks and Hazaras living in Afghanistan. Non-Pashtuns believed that the aim of reunification of Pashtuns areas was to increase the population of Pashtuns in Afghanistan. As a result, Daoud Khan was extremely unpopular with Non-Pashtun Afghans.

Daoud Khan with Abdul Ghaffar Khan, 1961

Bacha Khan stated that "Daoud Khan only exploited the idea of reunification of Pashtun people to meet his own political ends". In 1960 and later in 1961, Daoud Khan made two attempts to capture Bajaur District in Khyber Pakthunkhwa, Pakistan. However, all of Daoud Khan attempts failed as the Afghan army was routed with heavy casualties. Several Afghan army soldiers were also captured by Pakistani soldiers and they were paraded in front of international media which in turn caused embarrassment for Daoud Khan. As a consequence of Daoud Khan's actions, Pakistan closed its border with Afghanistan which caused economic crisis in Afghanistan. Because of continued resentment against Daoud's autocratic rule, close ties with the Soviet Union and economic downturn caused by the blockade imposed by Pakistan, Daoud Khan was forced to resign by King Zahir Shah. Under King Zahir Shah rule, relations between Pakistan and Afghanistan improved and Pakistan opened its border with Afghanistan. However, later on in 1973, Daoud Khan seized power from King Zahir Shah in a military Coup d'état and declared himself the first president of Afghanistan. After seizing the power, the Daoud Khan's government started proxy war against Pakistan. Daoud Khan's government established several training camps for anti-Pakistani militants in Kabul and Kandahar with the aim of training and arming those militants to carry out their activities against Pakistan. On the other hand, Mirzali Khan and his followers continued their guerilla war against the Pakistani government from their base in Gurwek. In 1960, Afghan Prime Minister Mohammed Daoud Khan sent the Afghan military across the poorly-demarcated Durand Line into the Pakistani Bajaur Agency in order to manipulate events in the region and press the Pashtunistan issue; these plans ultimately came to nothing after the Afghan troops were defeated by Pakistani irregular forces. In support of the quasi-invasion, the Afghan government engaged in an intense propaganda war via radio broadcasts.

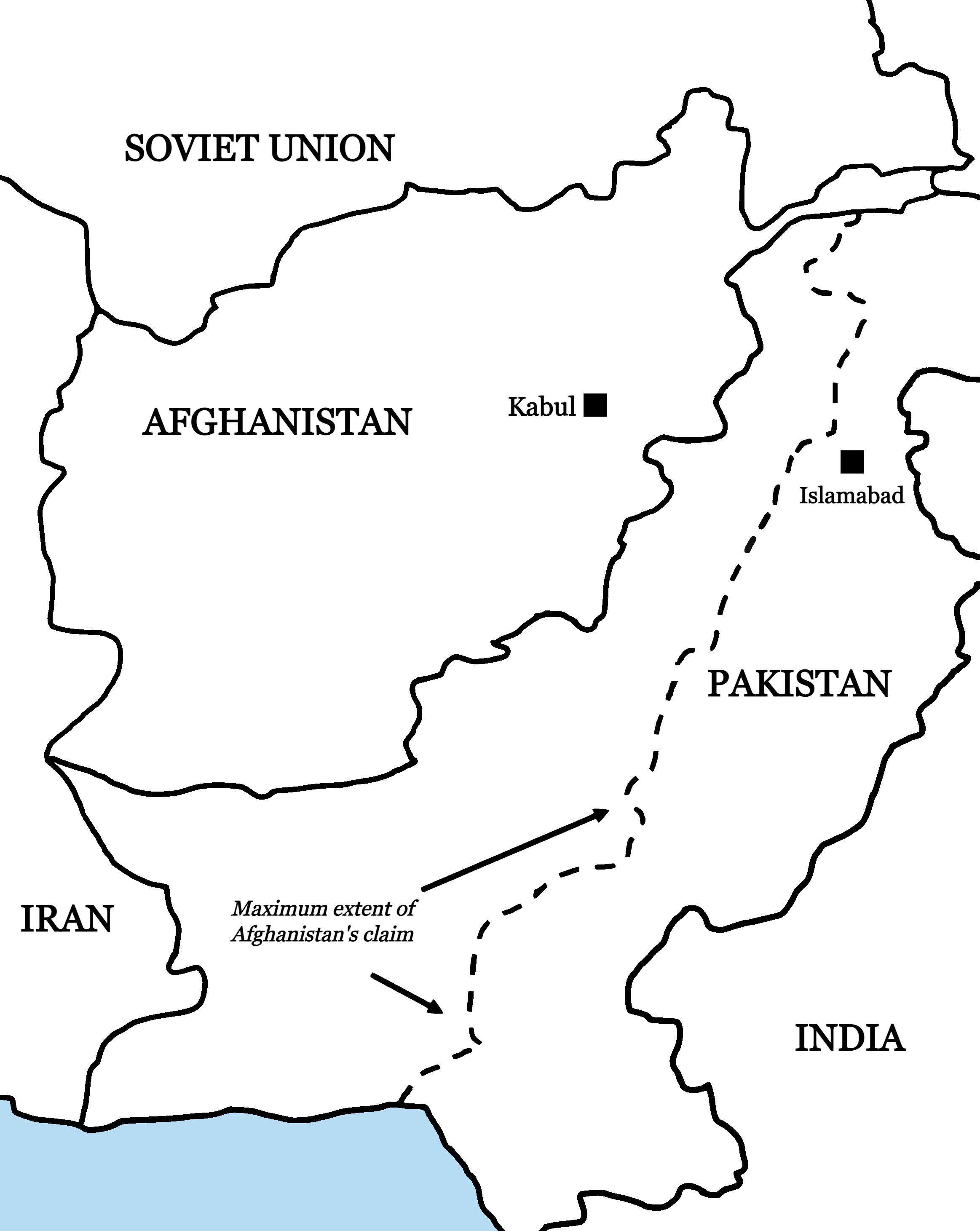
Afghanistan's territorial claims against Pakistan

Pakistani government decided to retaliate against the Afghan government's Pashtunistan policy by supporting Non-Pashtun opponents of the Afghan government including future Mujaheddin leaders like Gulbuddin Hekmatyar and Ahmad Shah Massoud. This operation was remarkably successful, and by 1977 the Afghan government of Daoud Khan was willing to settle all outstanding issues in exchange for a lifting of the ban on the National Awami Party and a commitment towards provincial autonomy for Pashtuns, which was already guaranteed by Pakistan's Constitution, but stripped by the Bhutto government when the One Unit scheme was introduced.

Bacha Khan who previously strived greatly for Pashtunistan later on in 1980 during an interview with an Indian journalist, Haroon Siddiqui said that the "idea of Pashtunistan never helped Pashtuns. In fact it was never a reality". He further said that "successive Afghan governments have exploited the idea for their own political ends". It was only towards the end of Mohammed Daoud Khan regime that he stopped talking about Pashtunistan. Later on, even Nur Muhammad Taraki also talked about the idea of Pashtunistan and caused trouble for Pakistan. He also said that "Pashtun people greatly suffered because of all this."

In 1976, the then president of Afghanistan, Sardar Mohammed Daoud Khan recognised Durand Line as international border between Pakistan and Afghanistan. He made this declaration while he was on an official visit to Islamabad, Pakistan.

Daoud would be overthrown by Khalqist military officers in 1978 leading to the formation of the Democratic Republic of Afghanistan which was dominated by Pashtun Khalqists who would go on to "reopen the Pashtunistan wound". In 1979 under General Secretary Nur Muhammad Taraki the Khalqists regime in Afghanistan changed the official map to include NWFP and Balochistan as new "frontier provinces" of the DRA. The Khalqist regime also sought to make Pashto the sole language of the Afghan government and the lingua franca, they did so by undermining Dari. The Afghan anthem under the communist regime was only in Pashto and not Dari with non-Pashtuns being required to sing it in Pashto. Up until the overthrow of Dr Najibullah's Homeland Party regime in 1992, Afghan governments had favored Pashto in the media and over 50% of Afghan media was in Pashto. After 1992 with the formation of the Tajik led Islamic State of Afghanistan, this number dropped drastically.

Following the outbreak of the Soviet–Afghan War in Afghanistan, millions of Afghans including non-Pashtun people fled to Khyber Pakhtunkhwa.

== 20th and 21st century ==
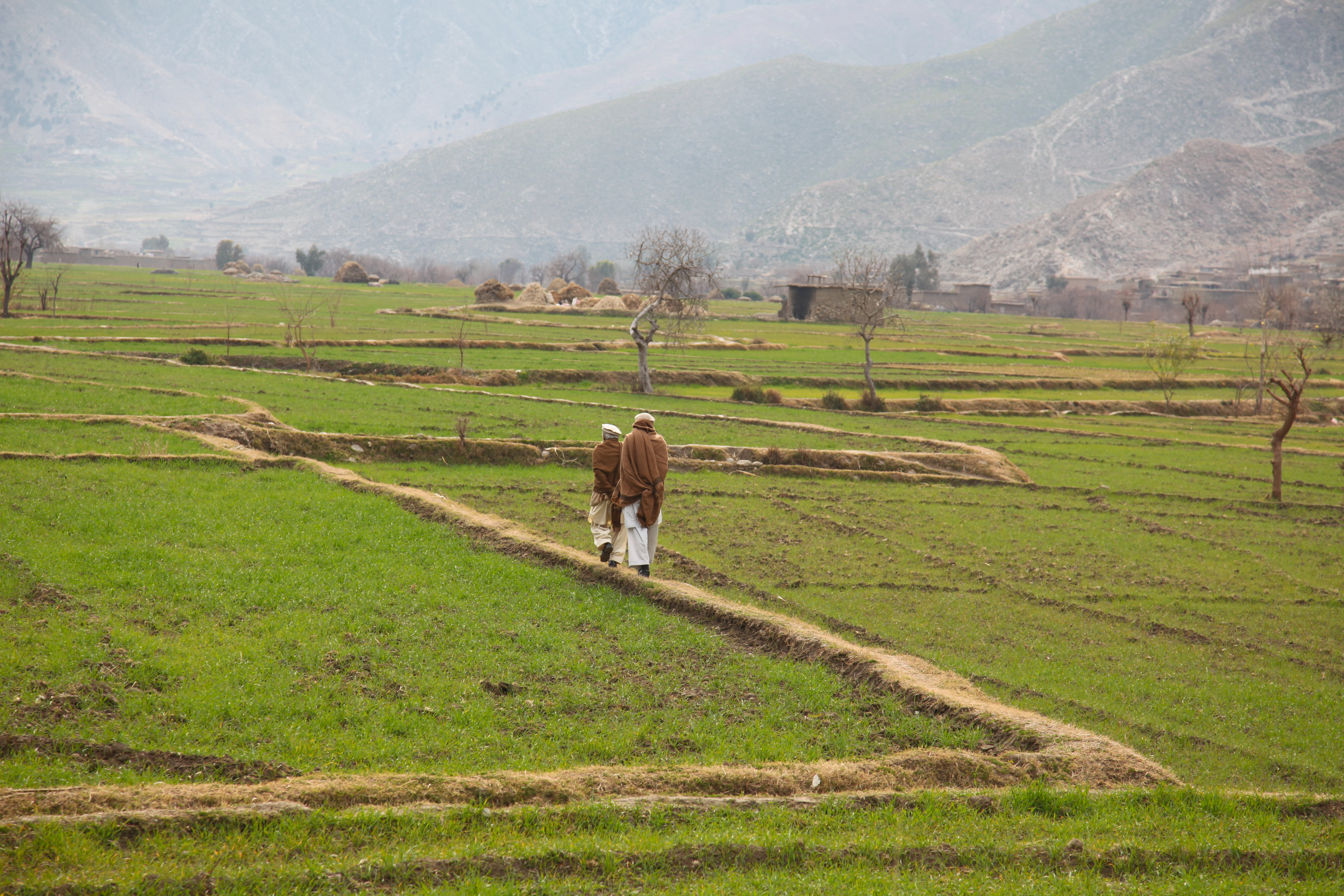
A village in Kunar Province of Afghanistan

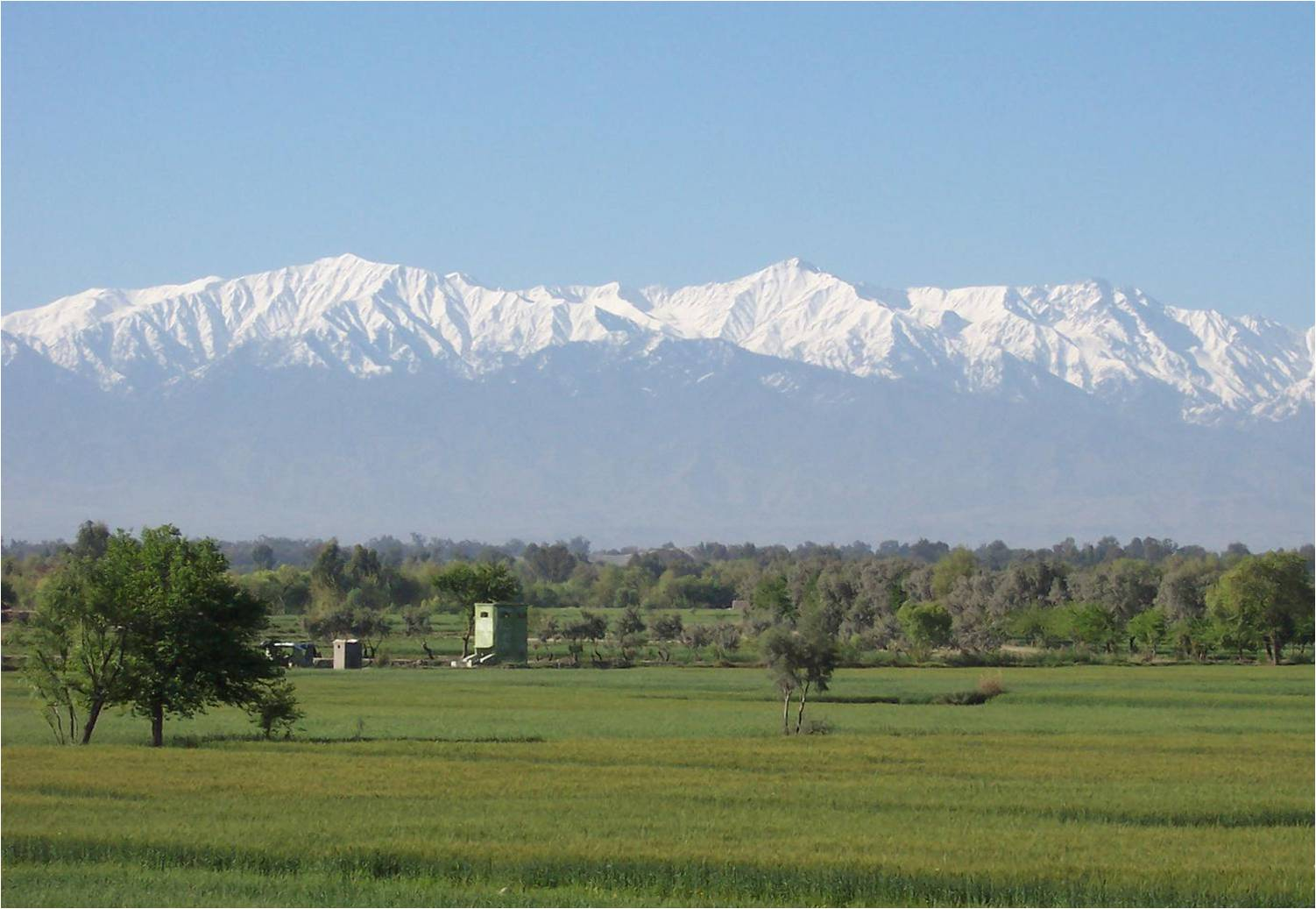
Nangarhar Province, Afghanistan

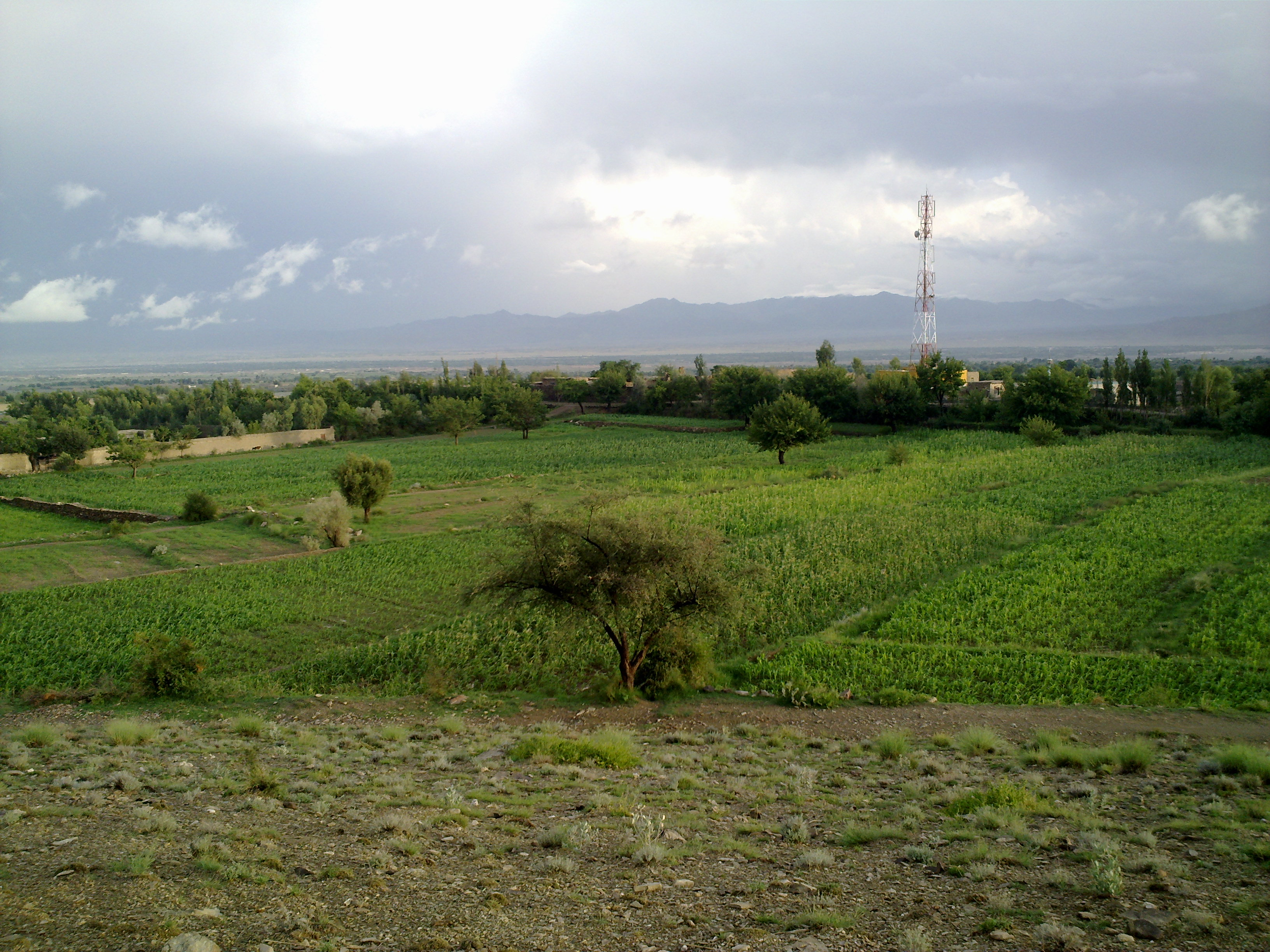
A village in Khost Province, Afghanistan

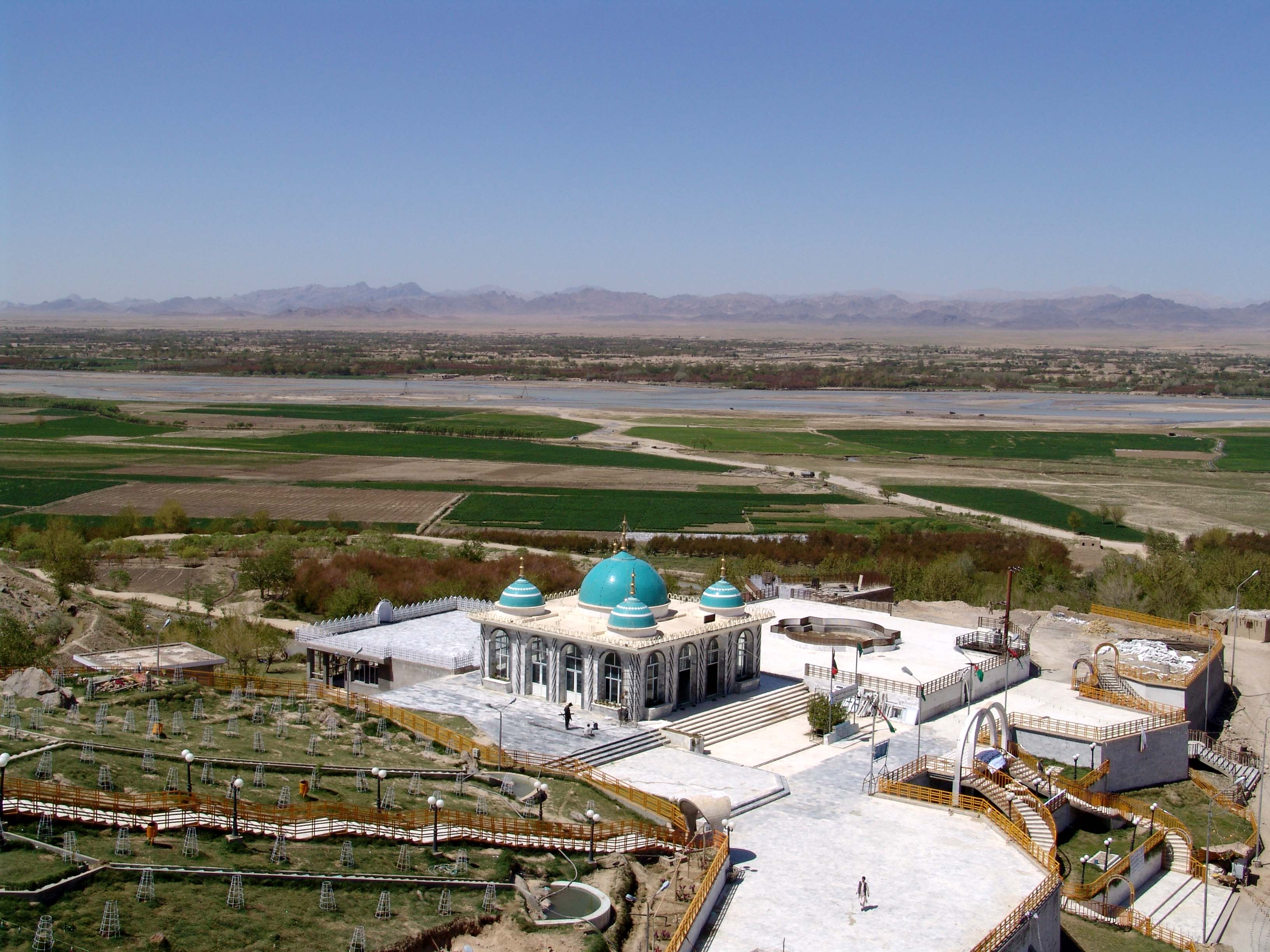
The shrine of Hassan Abdal in the Arghandab District of Kandahar Province in Afghanistan.

Pashtuns in Pakistan make up the second largest ethnic group after Punjabis making up around 15.4% of the total population which equates to about 39 million (This figure includes all Pashtuns in Pakistan including the diaspora in Punjab and Sindh). (Note: Pashtuns comprise 15.4% (38,864,994) of Pakistan's total population of 252,363,571 per 2024 estimate by the World Factbook.) In addition, there are 1.7 million Afghan refugees of whom majority are Pashtuns. These refugees, however, are expected to leave Pakistan and settle in Afghanistan in the coming years. Three Pakistani presidents belonged to the Pashtun ethnic group. Pashtuns continue to occupy important places in the military and politics, with the former Prime Minister of Pakistan Imran Khan who leads Pakistan Tehreek-e-Insaf (PTI) and Awami National Party led by Asfandyar Wali . In addition to this, some Pashtun media, music and cultural activities are based out of Pakistan, with AVT Khyber being a Pashto TV channel in Pakistan. Pashto cinema is based out of the Pakistani city of Peshawar. The Pakistani city of Karachi is believed to host the largest concentration of Pashtuns.

There are more than 19 million Pashtuns in Afghanistan, constituting 48% of the population. Other sources say that up to 60% of Afghanistan's population is made up of ethnic Pashtuns, forming the largest ethnic group in that country. Pashto is one of the official languages of Afghanistan, the Afghan National Anthem is recited in Pashto language and the Pashtun dress is the national dress of Afghanistan. Since the late 19th century, the traditional Pashtunistan region has gradually expanded to the Amu River in the north. However, most Pashtun living in north of the Helmand River tend to speak Dari instead of Pashto.

Important government positions in Afghanistan have historically been held by Pashtuns. The Afghan Armed Forces was also traditionally dominated by Pashtuns however the fall of the Najibullah regime in 1992 led to the creation of the Tajik dominated Islamic State of Afghanistan.

The majority of the Afghan Taliban are ethnic Pashtuns, with past Pashtun leaders such as Mullah Mohammed Omar, Mohammad Rabbani and Jalaluddin Haqqani. The current leaders of the Taliban include Pashtuns such as Abdul Kabir, Hibatullah Akhundzada and Sirajuddin Haqqani.

Afghanistan makes its claim on the Pashtun areas on the ground that it served as the Pashtun seat of power since 1709 with the rise of the Hotaki dynasty followed by the establishment of the Durrani Afghan Empire. According to historic sources, Afghan tribes did not appear in Peshawar valley until after 800 AD, when the Islamic conquest of this area took place.

Agreements cited by the Afghan government as proof of their claim over the Pashtun tribes include Article 11 of the Anglo-Afghan Treaty of 1921, which states: "The two contracting parties, being mutually satisfied themselves each regarding the goodwill of the other and especially regarding their benevolent intentions towards the tribes residing close to their respective boundaries, hereby undertake to inform each other of any future military operations which may appear necessary for the maintenance of order among the frontier tribes residing within their respective spheres before the commencement of such operations." A supplementary letter to the Anglo-Afghan Treaty of 1921 reads: "As the conditions of the Frontier tribes of the two governments are of interest to the Government of Afghanistan. I inform you that the British government entertains feelings of goodwill towards all the Frontier tribes and has every intention of treating them generously, provided they abstain from outrages against the people of India."

The Durand Line and Pashtunistan issues have been raised by different Afghan regimes in the past. However, it may no longer be a concern. Pashtuns are now so well integrated in Pakistani society that the majority will never opt for Pashtunistan or Afghanistan. Afghan-Pashtun refugees have been staying in Khyber Pakhtunkhwa for more than 30 years. Threat perceptions about Afghanistan need re-evaluation so that suitable changes are made in our Afghan policy.

— Asad Munir, Retired brigadier who has served in senior intelligence postings in Khyber-Pakhtunkhwa and FATA

=== Khyber Pakhtunkhwa ===
Prominent 20th century proponents of the Pashtunistan cause have included Khan Abdul Wali Khan and Khan Abdul Ghaffar Khan. Ghaffar Khan stated in the Pakistan Constituent Assembly in 1948 that he simply wanted "the renaming of his province as Pashtunistan same like Punjab, Sindh and Baluchishtan are the names of provinces of Pakistan as ethno-linguistic names, Another name mentioned is Afghania where the initial "A" in Choudhary Rahmat Ali Khan's theory stated in the "Now or Never" pamphlet stands for the second letter in "Pakistan". However, this name has failed to capture political support in the province.

There was support, however, to rename North-West Frontier Province (NWFP) as Pakhtunkhwa (which translates as "area of Pashtuns"). Nasim Wali Khan (the wife of Khan Abdul Wali Khan) declared in an interview: "I want an identity. I want the name to change so that Pashtuns may be identified on the map of Pakistan..."

On 31 March 2010, Pakistan's Constitutional Reform Committee agreed that the province be named and recognized as Khyber-Pakhtunkhwa. This is now the official name for the former NWFP.

== Gallery ==
Images of the Pashtunistan region

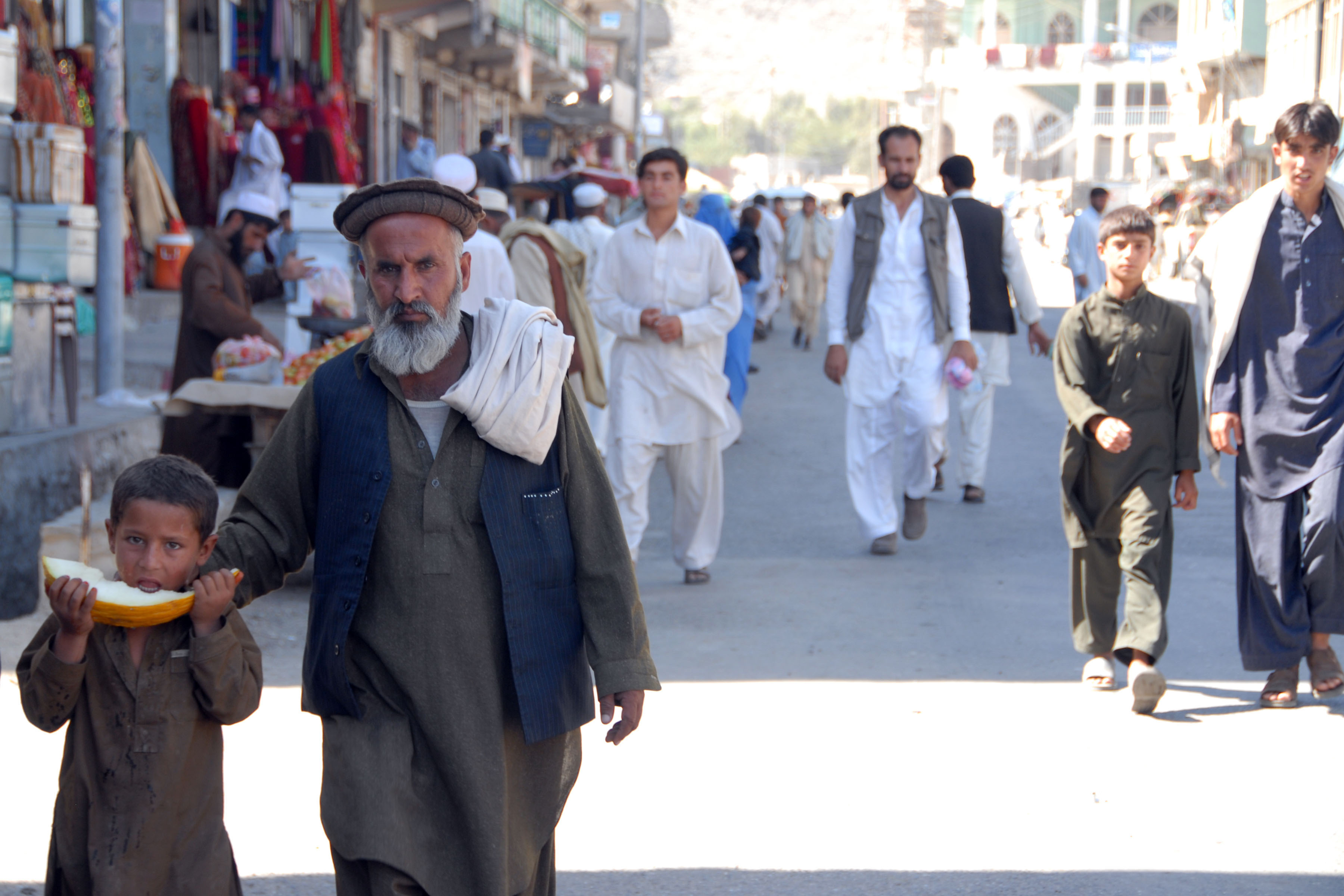
Asadabad, capital of Kunar Province in Afghanistan

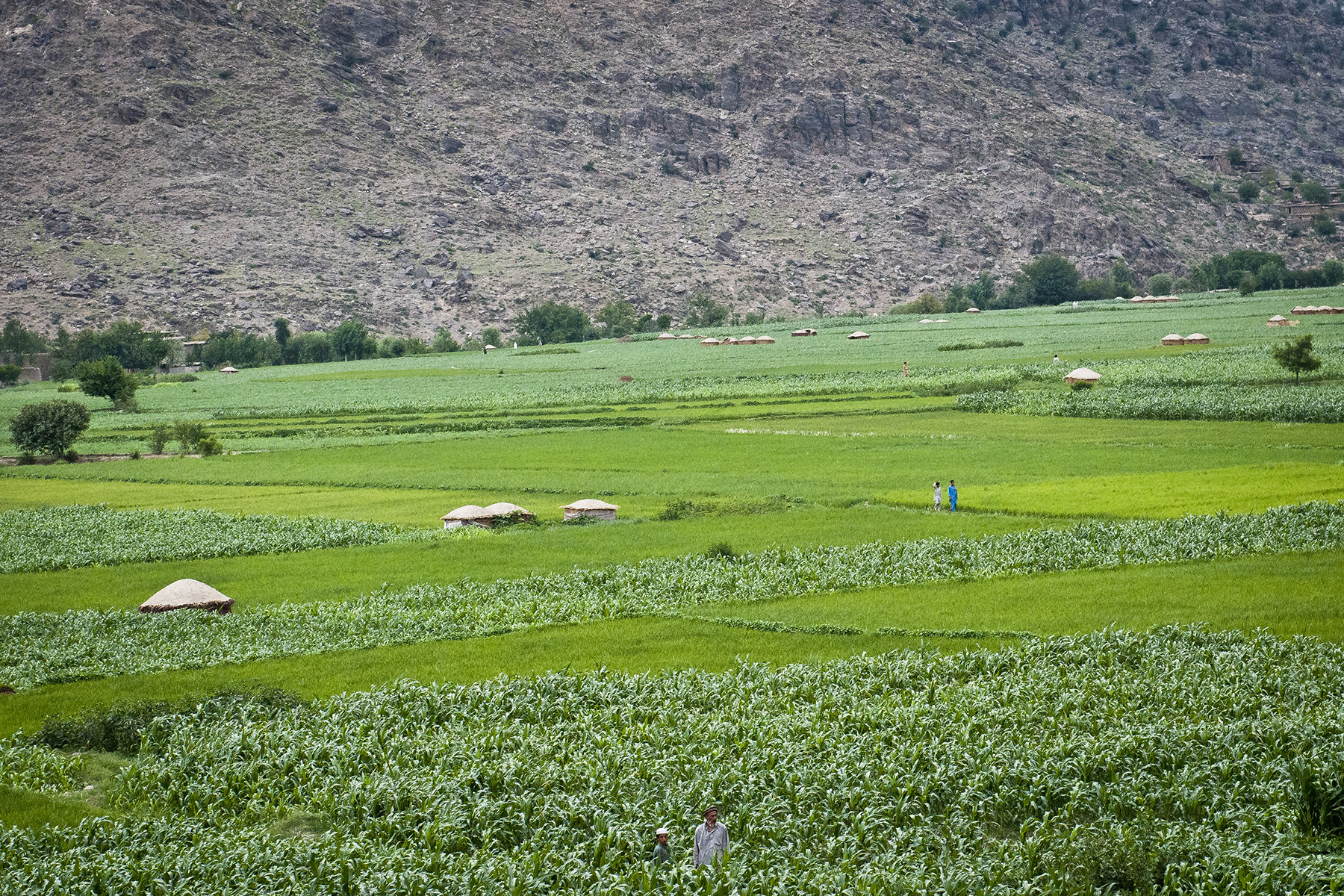
Pech River Valley

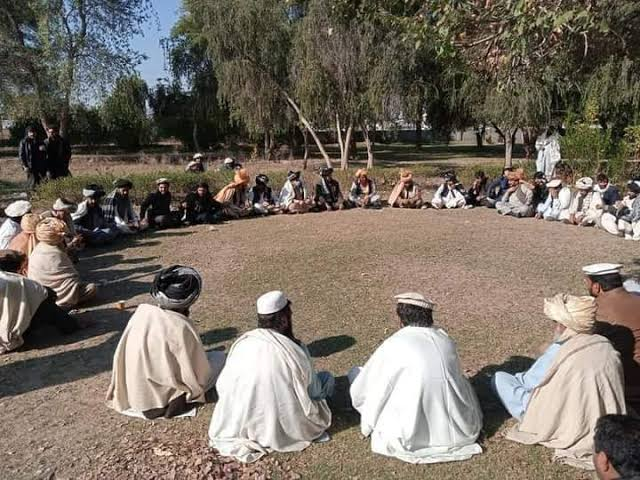
A Group of Banuchi and Wazir Elders sitting in a Jirga, Bannu, Khyber Pakhtunkhwa.

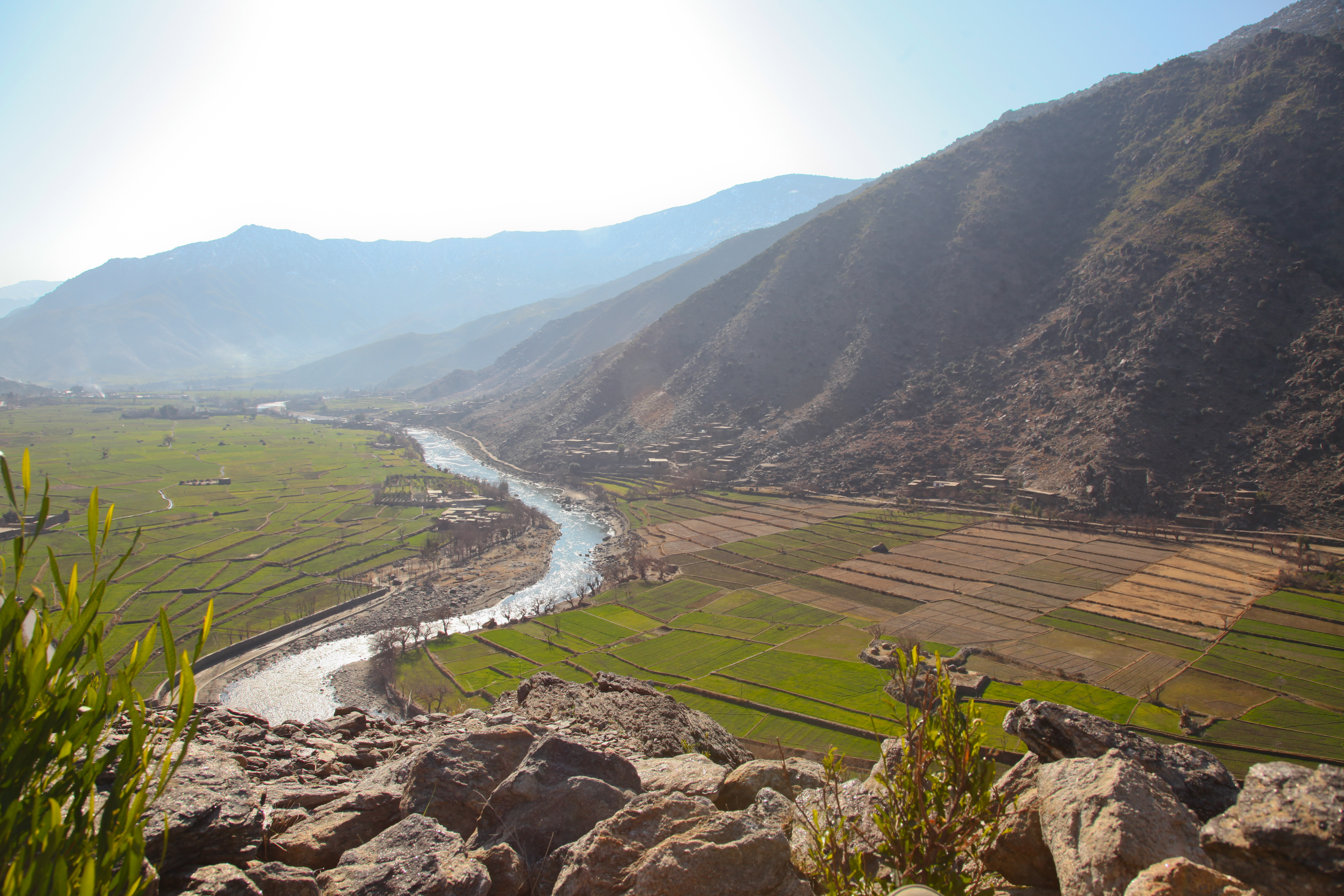
Watapur District of Kunar Province

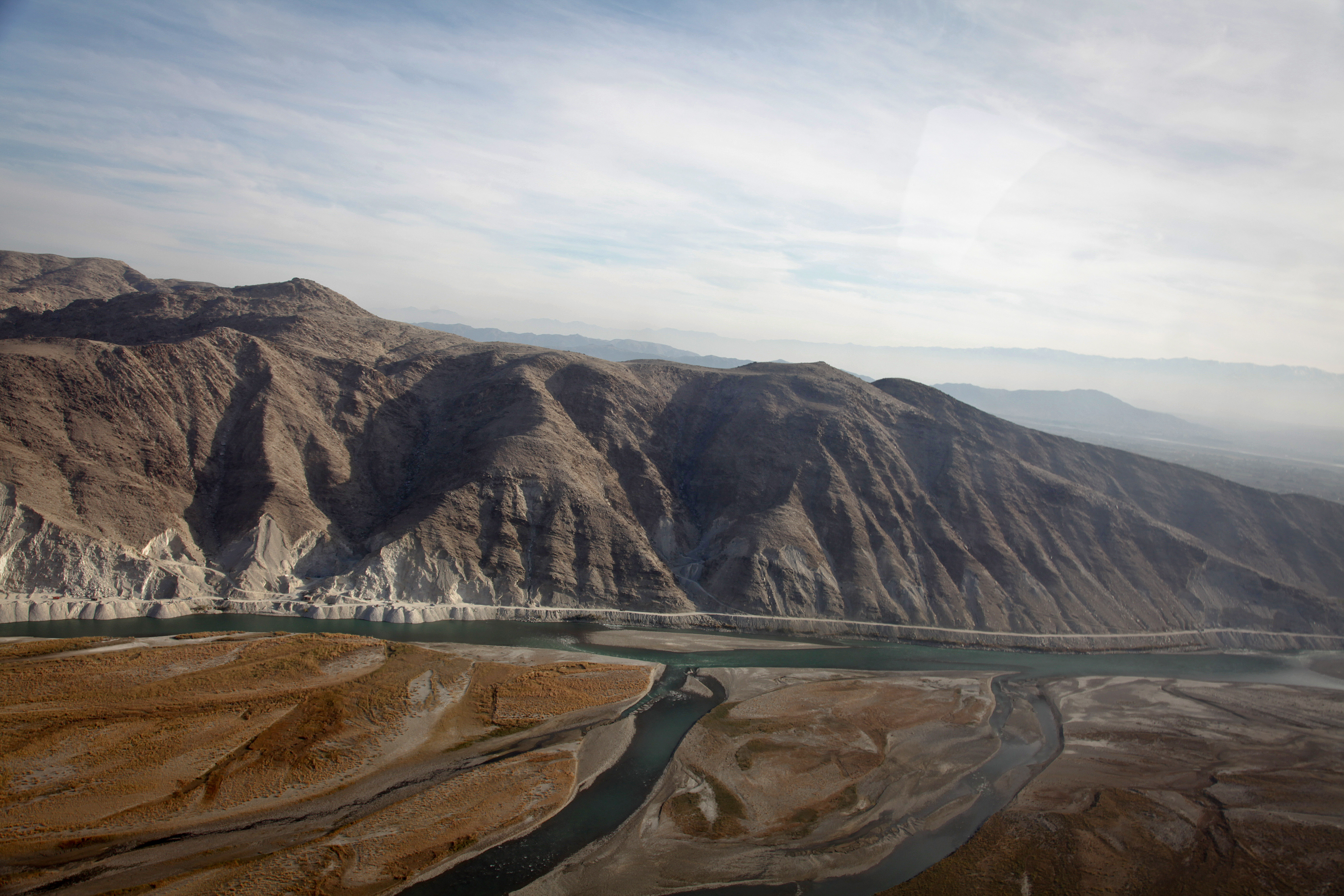
Branches of the Kunar River meet in Nangarhar Province

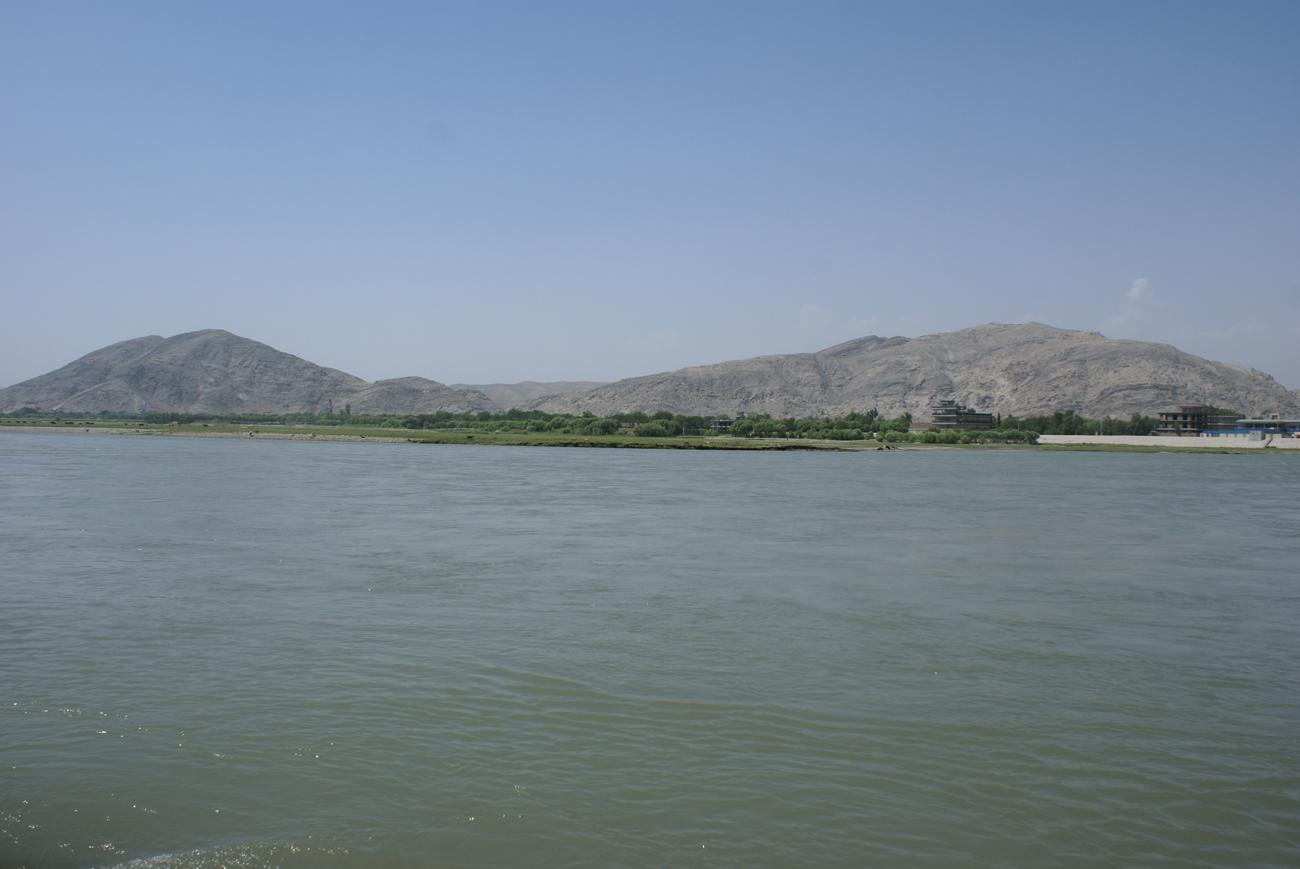
Kabul River in Jalalabad, Afghanistan

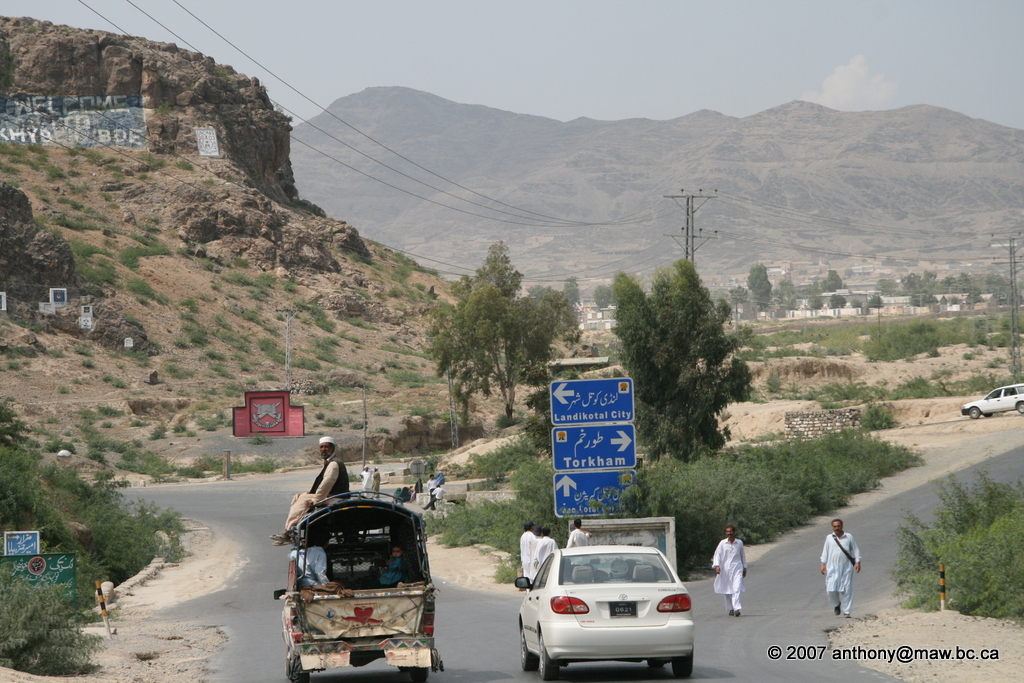
Khyber Pass in Khyber Pakhtunkhwa, Pakistan

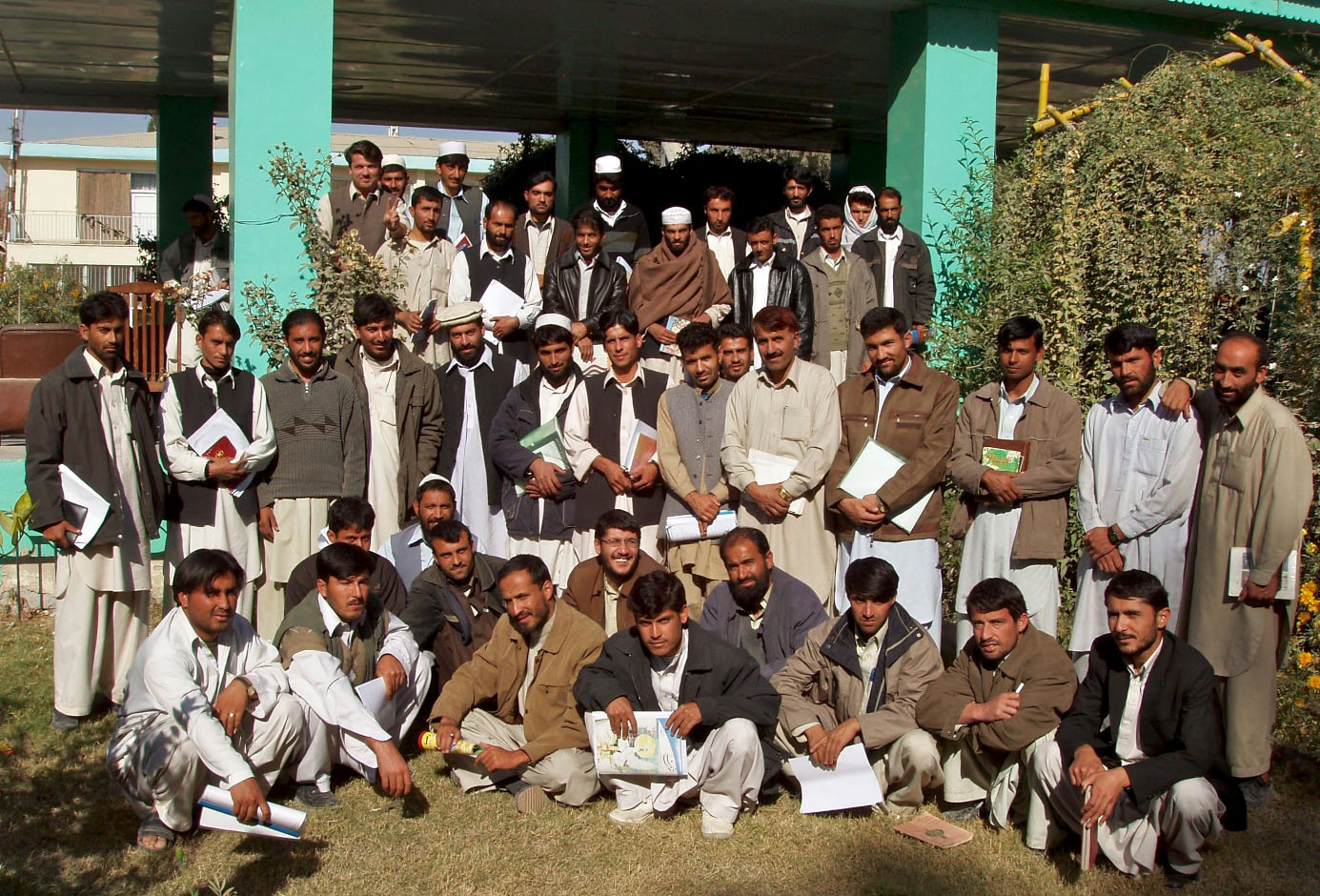
People attending Khost University in Khost, Afghanistan

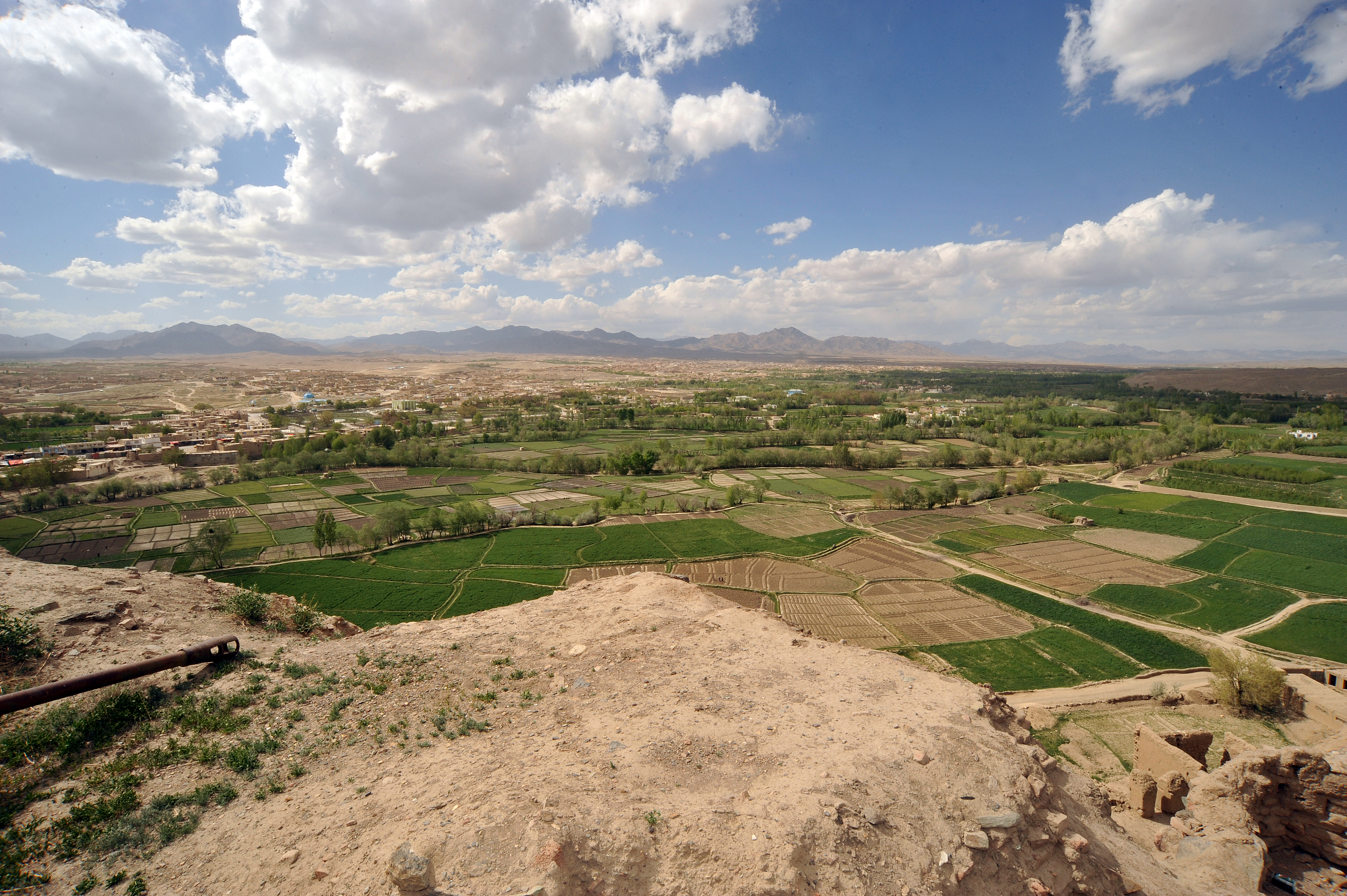
Ghazni Province, Afghanistan

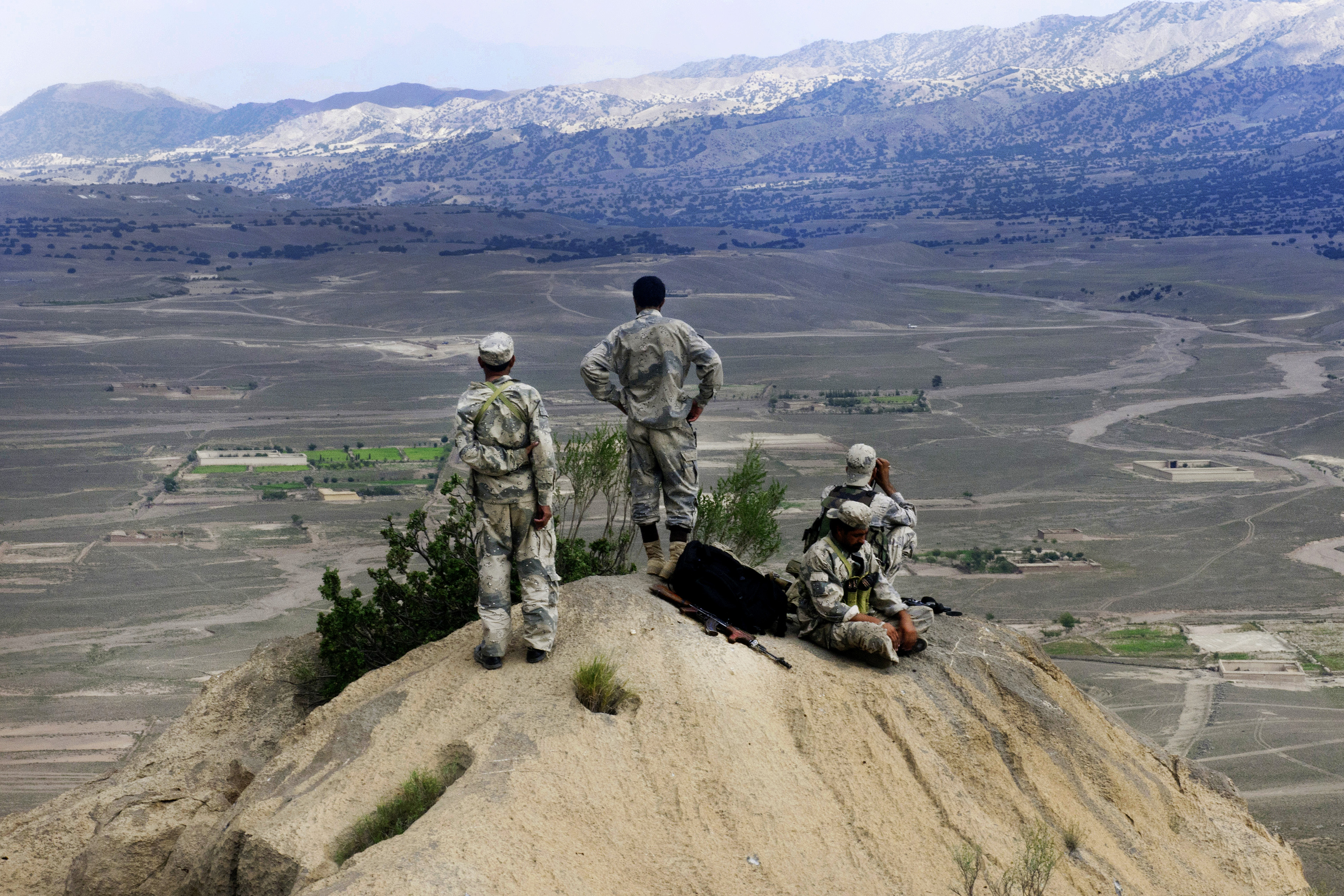
Afghan Border Police (ABP) in Paktika Province

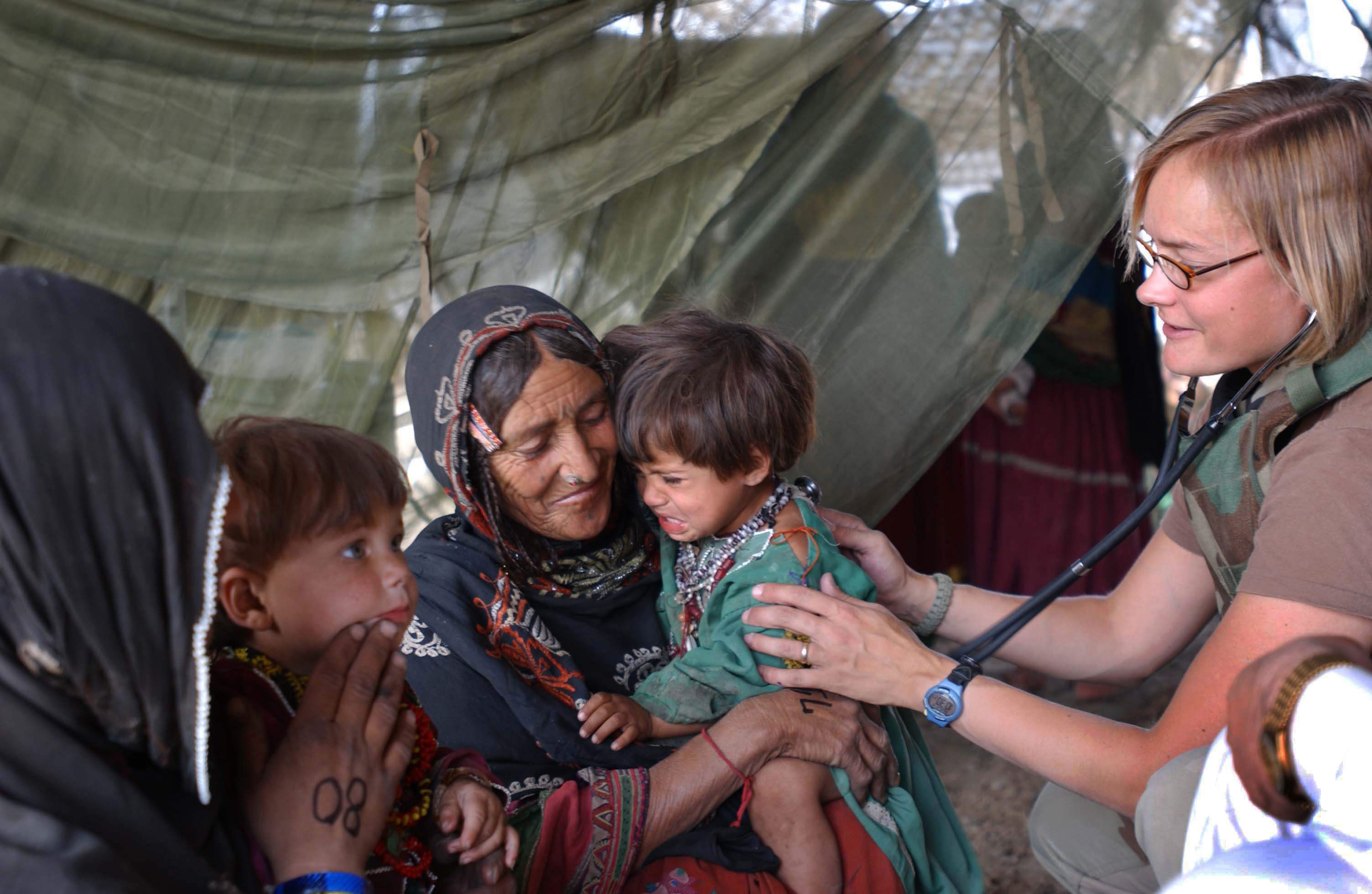
Kuchi people in Paktia Province of Afghanistan

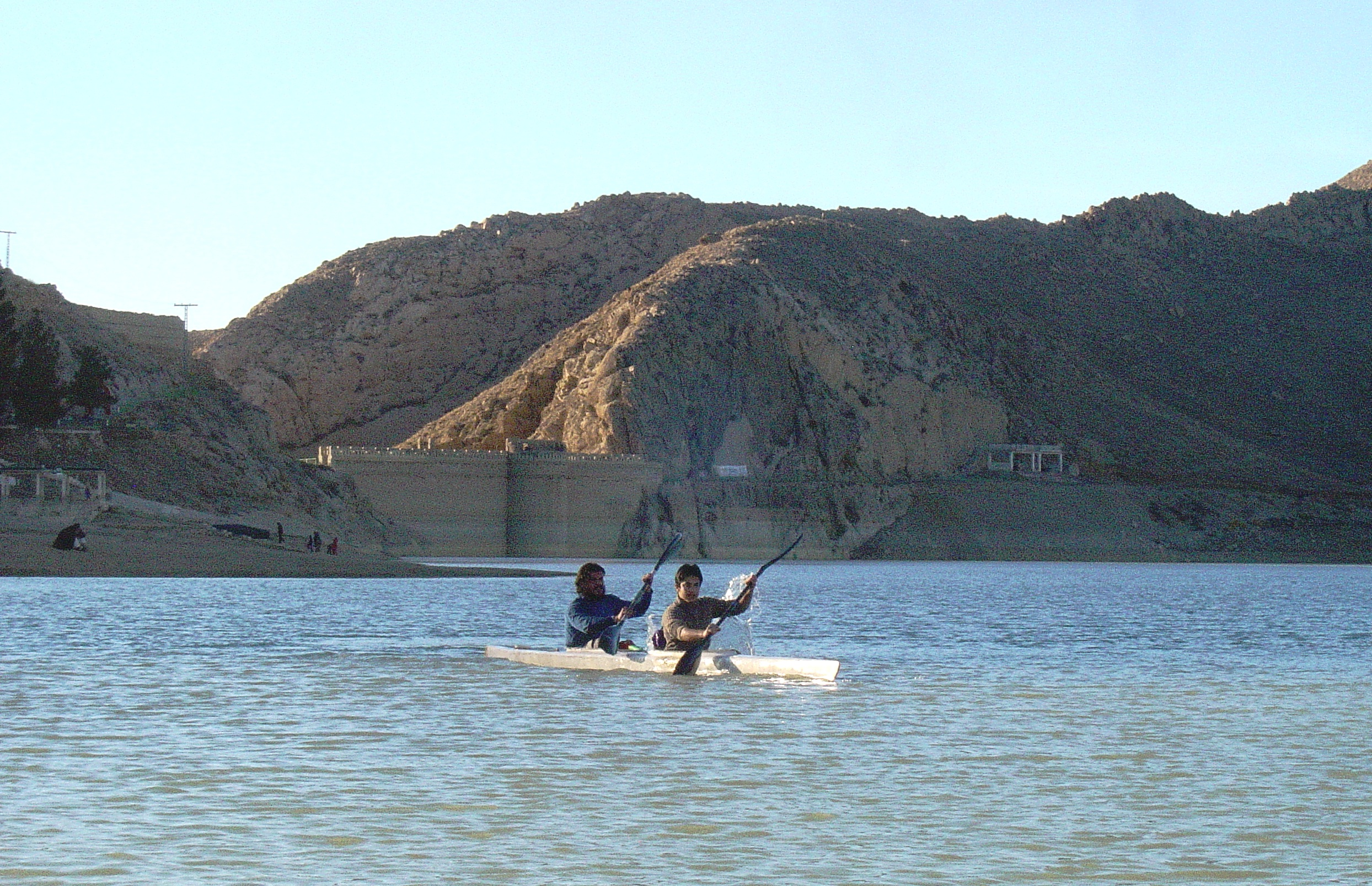
Hanna Lake in Quetta, Pakistan

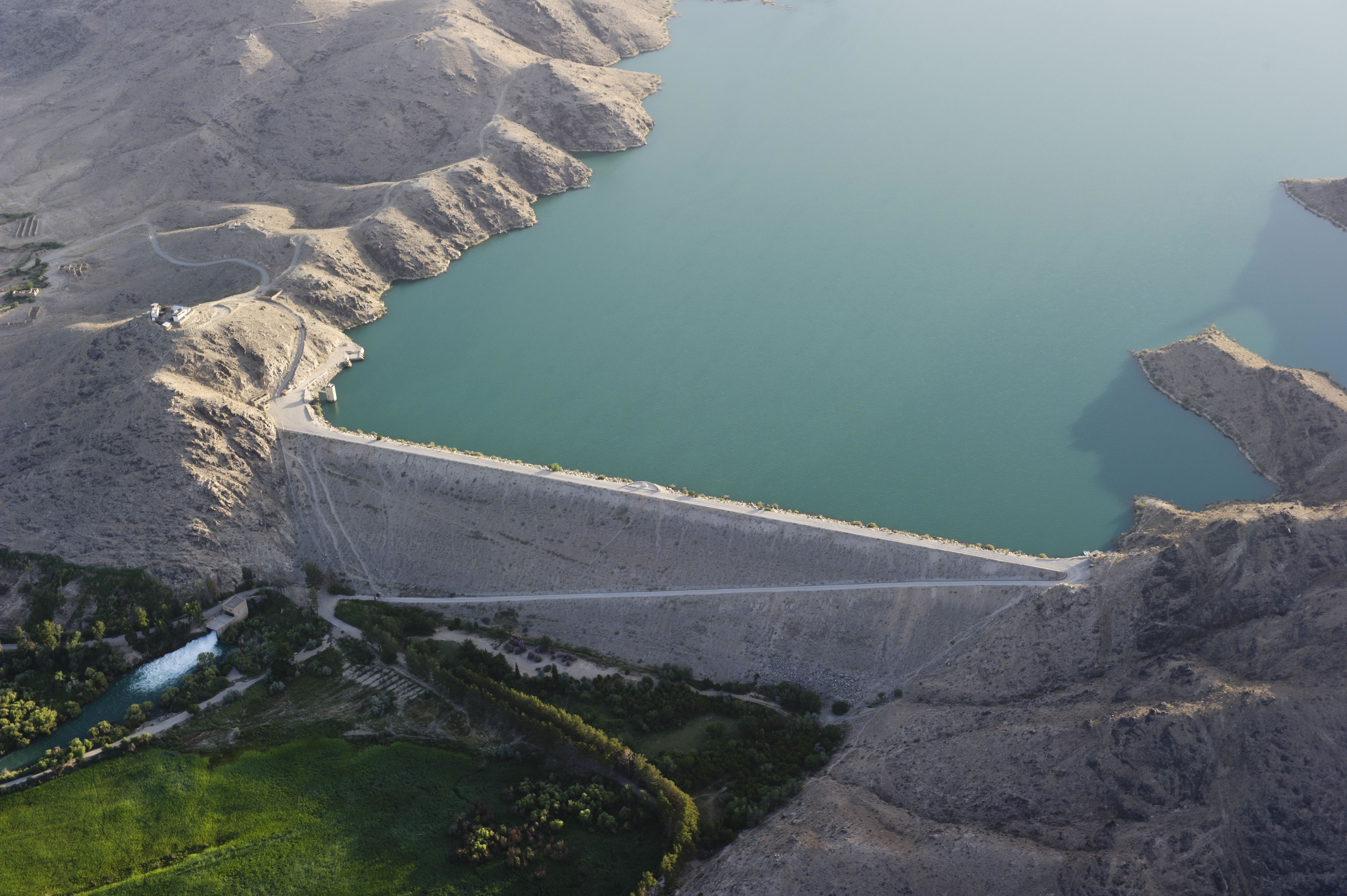
Dahla Dam in Kandahar Province

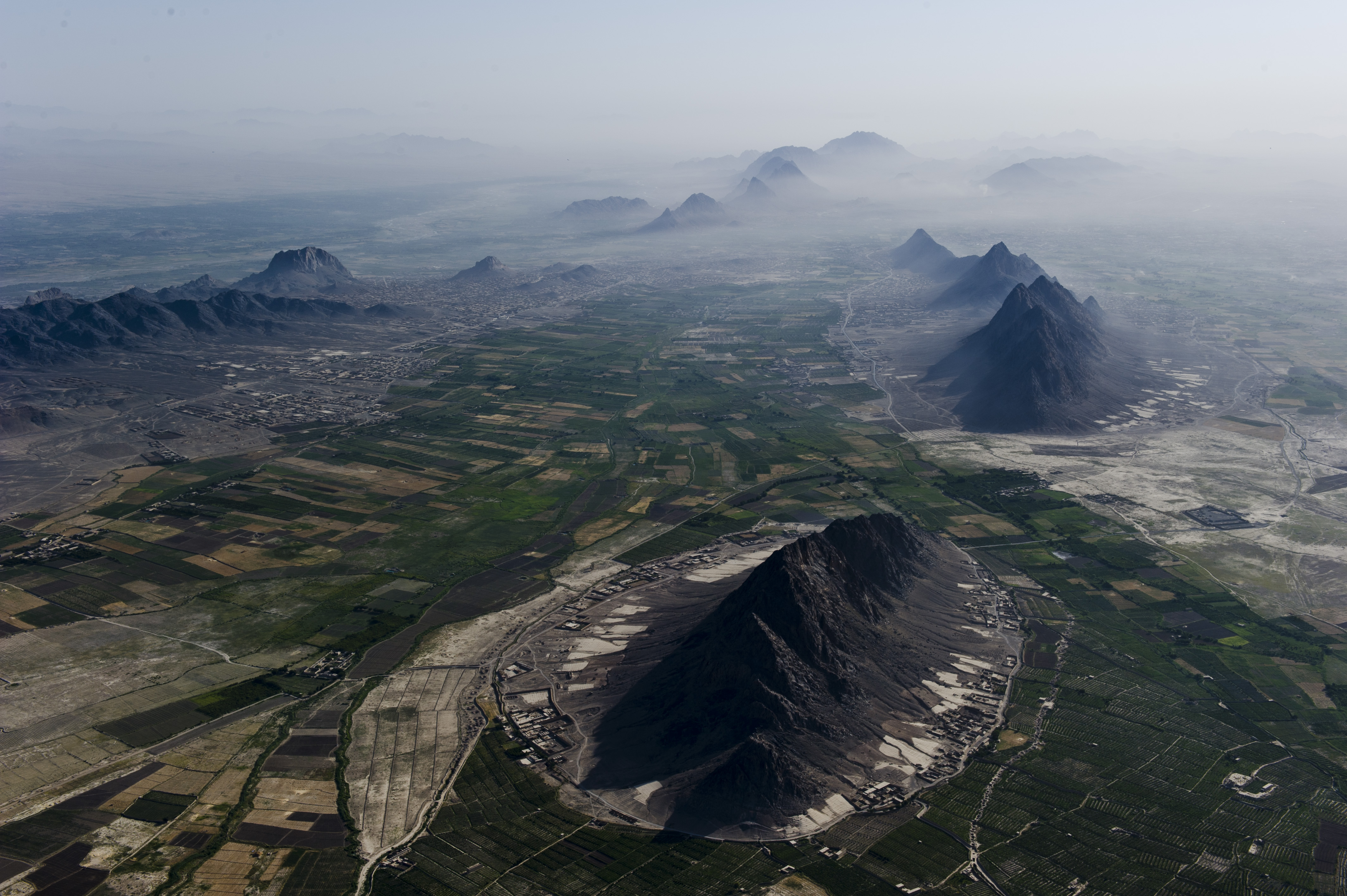
Kandahar Province, Afghanistan

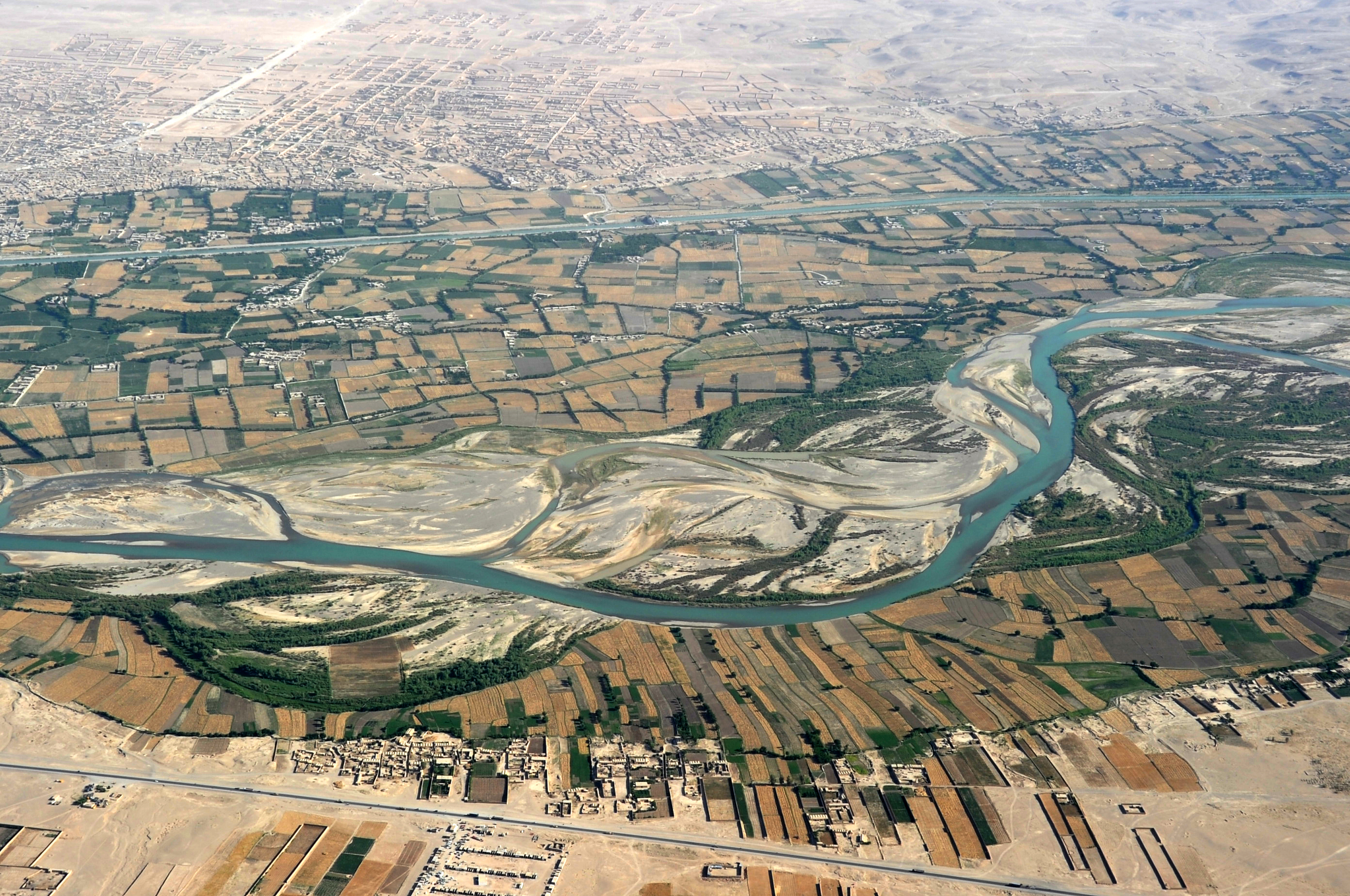
Helmand River in Helmand Province, Afghanistan

== See also ==
- Afghan Millat Party
- Khalq
- Awami National Party
- Bacha Khan
- Bannu Resolution
- Durand Line
- Greater Iran
- Hazarastan
- Hazara nationalism
- Manzoor Pashteen
- Pashtun nationalism
- Pashtunization
- Pashtunkhwa Milli Awami Party
- Pashtun Tahafuz Movement
- Sidhanoti tribal area
