= Sangeen Wali Khan =

Pakistani politician (1959–2008)

- سنگین ولی خان
- Born: June 7, 1958
- Died: June 28, 2008 (aged 50); Lahore
- Children: Lawangeen Wali Khan
- Parent(s): Abdul Wali Khan (father); Naseem Wali Khan (mother)
- Relatives: Abdul Ghaffar Khan (grandfather); Asfandyar Wali Khan (step-brother/foster brother); Dr Gulalai Wali Khan(sister)

Sangeen Wali Khan (Urdu: سنگين ولی خان) (7 June 1959 – 28 June 2008) was a Pakistani politician. He was son of Abdul Wali Khan and Nasim Wali Khan, and the half brother of Asfandyar Wali Khan, leader of Awami National Party. Sangeen Wali Khan was contender for Senate seat from Khyber-Pakhtunkhwa with a ticket from Awami National Party, in May 2008. Khan contested his last election and was defeated by Saeed Muhammad Khan son of Lala Nisar Muhammad Khan.

Khan died on 25 June 2008 at the age of 49. He was suffering from liver cancer and died at the Shaukat Khanum Hospital, Lahore. He left behind a widow, son (Lawangeen Wali Khan) and two daughters.

== See also ==
- Khan Abdul Bahram Khan
- Khan Abdul Jabbar Khan
- Abdul Ghaffar Khan
- Abdul Ghani Khan
- Abdul Wali Khan
- Nasim Wali Khan
- Asfandyar Wali Khan
- Bahram Khan Family
- Awami National Party
- Aimal Wali Khan
- Pakistan
