= Nasim Wali Khan =

Pakistani politician (1933–2021)

Begum Begum Nasim Wali Khan Moor BiBi
- بیگم نسیم ولی خان
- Born: 4 January 1932
- Died: May 16, 2021 (aged 89); Charsadda, Pakistan.
- Occupation: Politician
- Known for: Former Provincial Leader of Awami National Party
- Political party: Awami National Party; Awami National Party (Wali)
- Spouse: Abdul Wali Khan (m. 1953)
- Children: Sangeen Wali Khan, Gulalai Wali Khan, Asfandyar Wali Khan (step-son)

Begum Nasim Wali Khan Moor BiBi (Urdu: بیگم نسيم ولی خان مور بی بی 1932 – 16 May 2021) was a female politician in Pakistan. Nasim Wali Khan was a leader of Awami National Party–Wali. Nasim Wali Khan was the former provincial president and parliamentary leader of the Awami National Party in Provincial Assembly of Khyber-Pakhtunkhwa.

She was born in 1933. She was one of the main leaders of the Pakistan National Alliance and made history in 1977 as the first woman elected from a Khyber-Pakhtunkhwa province general seat in the 1977 election.

Nasim Wali Khan married Abdul Wali Khan in 1954. She was the mother of Sangeen Wali Khan (late), and Dr Gulalai Wali Khan as well as step-mother of Asfandyar Wali Khan. Nasim Wali Khan died on 16 May 2021 in Charsadda, Pakistan.

== See also ==
- Khan Abdul Bahram Khan
- Khan Abdul Jabbar Khan
- Abdul Ghaffar Khan
- Abdul Ghani Khan
- Abdul Wali Khan
- Khan Amirzadah Khan
- Asfandyar Wali Khan
- Sangeen Wali Khan
- Family of Bahram Khan
- Awami National Party
- Aimal Wali Khan
- Pakistan
