= Asfandyar Wali Khan =

Pakistani politician (born 1949)

Asfandyar Wali Khan اسفندیار ولی خان
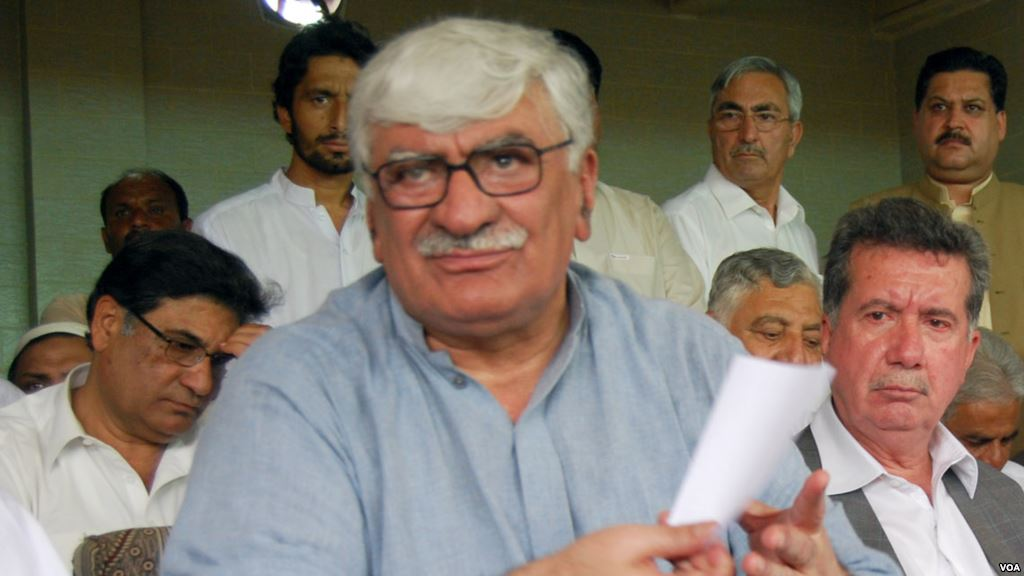

President of MSS
- In office 2003–2024
- Preceded by: Ehsan Wyne
- Succeeded by: Aimal Wali Khan
- In office 1999–2002
- Preceded by: Ajmal Khattak
- Succeeded by: Ehsan Wyne

Personal details
- Born: 19 February 1949 (age 77) Charsadda, North-West Frontier Province, Pakistan (present-day Khyber Pakhtunkhwa, Pakistan)
- Other political affiliations: ANP (1987-2024)
- Children: Aimal Wali Khan (son)
- Parents: Abdul Wali Khan (father); Taj Bibi (mother)
- Relatives: Khan Abdul Bahram Khan (great-Grand father); Abdul Ghaffar Khan (grandfather); Abdul Ghani Khan (uncle); Abdul Ali Khan (uncle); Sangeen Wali Khan (step-brother)
- Profession: Politician
- Parliament Pakistan

Asfandyar Wali Khan (Note: Pashto: اسفندیار ولي خان; Urdu: اسفندیار ولی خان) (born 19 February 1949) is a Pakistani politician who served as president of the Awami National Party (ANP), a left wing, Pashtun nationalist Federalist party from 2003 to 2024. He is the son of Abdul Wali Khan, the party's founding president.

Wali Khan is the current president of the Awami National Party. He has served as Member of Provincial Assembly of Khyber Pakhtunkhwa, as a Member of the National Assembly of Pakistan, and a senator in the Senate of Pakistan.

== Family background ==
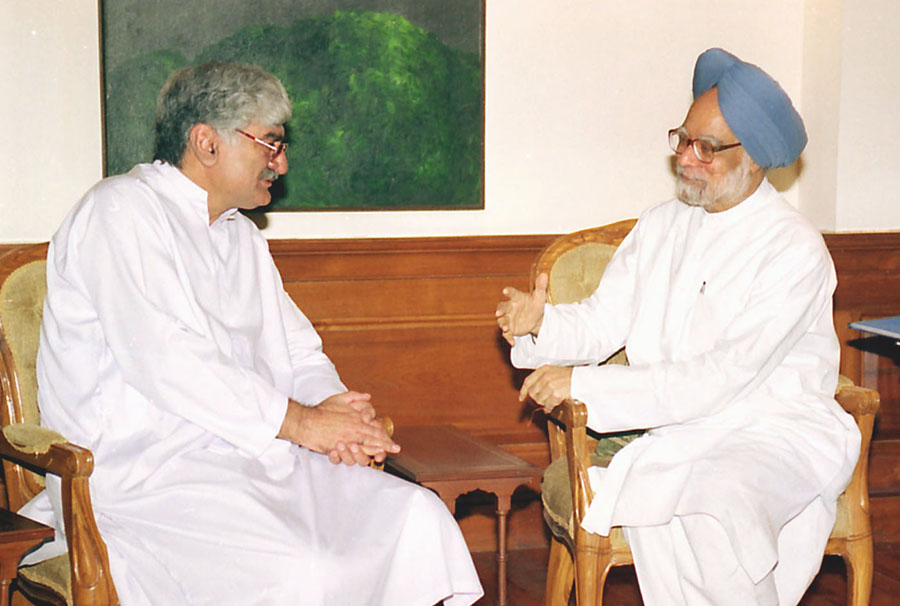
Asfandyar Wali Khan calls on the Prime Minister Manmohan Singh in New Delhi on 28 July 2004.

Asfandyar Wali Khan was born in Charsadda, a small village near Peshawar, Khyber Pakhtunkhwa. He is the eldest son of Abdul Wali Khan and his first wife, Taj Bibi. His father married Taj Bibi's death in February 1949 Nasim Wali Khan in 1954. Sangeen Wali Khan, is the eldest son of this marriage and was Asfandyar's half-brother.

He is the grandson of Abdul Ghaffar Khan, better known as Bacha Khan, wo founded the non-violent political movement Khudai Khidmatgar ("Servants of the God") in the NWFP during British colonial rule in India and a companion of Mahatma Gandhi. Wali Khan's granduncle, Khan Abdul Jabbar Khan, served as the Indian National Congress's Chief Minister of the North-West Frontier Province, during the final days of the British Raj and early days of independent Pakistan.

=== Education ===
Asfandyar Wali Khan received his early education at Aitchison College in Lahore, completed high school at Islamia Collegiate School, and earned his Bachelor's degree from Islamia College, University of Peshawar, in Khyber Pakhtunkhwa.

== Political career ==
Asfandyar Wali Khan began his political activism as a student, joining the opposition against Ayub Khan. In 1975, he was imprisoned and tortured by the government of Zulfiqar Ali Bhutto due to his father's opposition to Bhutto. He endured severe mistreatment, including having his nails and hair forcibly removed, and was kept in a C-class jail. Convicted as part of the Hyderabad tribunal, he was sentenced to 15 years in prison. After his release in 1978, Asfandyar stayed away from electoral politics until 1990.

Asfandyar Wali Khan led the Pakhtun Student Federation before being elected to the Provincial Assembly in the 1990 election. In the 1993 election, he was elected to Pakistan's National Assembly, a seat he retained in the 1997 election. During this period, he served as the Parliamentary Leader of the ANP and chaired the Standing Committee on Inter-Provincial Coordination.

In 1999, Asfandyar Wali Khan was elected president of the ANP for the first time. Although he was defeated in the 2002 election due to a tactical alliance formed by "anti-ANP groups", mirroring his father's defeat in 1990, he resigned as party president only to be re-elected unopposed in the subsequent party election. In 2003, he was elected to the Senate for a six-year term. He was re-elected to the National Assembly in the February 2008 parliamentary elections, leading his party to power both provincially and nationally — the former for the first time since 1947 and the latter since 1997.

In September 2008, he was elected as chairman of the standing committee on foreign affairs.

In 2008 it was reported by Dawn that he made a secret visit to the United States in which he made high level contacts with the U.S Central Command.

== Assassination attempt ==
On 3 October 2008, Wali Khan survived an assassination attempt by a suicide bomber while greeting guests during Eid ul-Fitr. Despite the attack, he remained steadfast and continued to challenge the terrorists. Contrary to opposition claims that he fled to London, Asfandyar stayed in Charsadda and led his party in the fight against terrorism.

== See also ==
- Aimal Wali Khan (son)
- Abdul Wali Khan (grandfather)
- Abdul Ghaffar Khan (great-grandfather)
- Khan Abdul Bahram Khan (great-great-grandfather)
- Pakistan
