= Abdul Wali Khan =

Pakistani politician (1917–2006)

Abdul Wali Khan عبدالولی خان
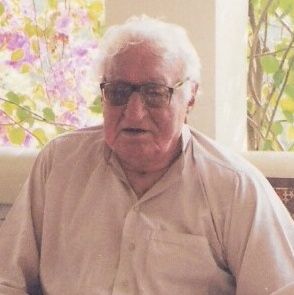

8th and 12th Leader of the Opposition
- In office 2 December 1988 – 6 August 1990
- Preceded by: Fakhar Imam
- Succeeded by: Benazir Bhutto
- In office 14 April 1972 – 17 August 1975
- Preceded by: Nurul Amin
- Succeeded by: Sherbaz Khan Mazari

Personal details
- Born: 11 January 1917 Utmanzai, North-West Frontier Province, British India
- Died: 26 January 2006 (aged 89) Peshawar, North-West Frontier Province, Pakistan
- Party: Awami National Party (1986–2006)
- Other political affiliations: Khudai Khidmatgar (till 1947); National Awami Party (1957–1968); National Awami Party (Wali) (1968–1986)
- Spouse(s): Taj Bibi Nasim Wali Khan (m. 1954)
- Relations: Abdul Ghani Khan (brother); Abdul Jabbar Khan (uncle); Bahram Khan (grandfather)
- Children: Sangeen Wali Khan; Asfandyar Wali Khan; Dr. Gulalai Wali Khan
- Parent(s): Abdul Ghaffar Khan; Meharqanda Kinankhel
- Education: Azad Islamia High School

Khan Abdul Wali Khan (Note: Pashto: خان عبدالولي خان; Urdu: خان عبدالولی خان) (11 January 1917 – 26 January 2006) was a Pakistani politician who served as president of the National Awami Party from 1967 till its dissolution in 1986, and then of the Awami National Party, a left wing Pashtun nationalist federalist party. He was the Leader of the Opposition twice, from 1972 to 1975 and from 1988 to 1990. A political rival of Zulfikar Ali Bhutto, he led the Pakistan National Alliance, and then a nationwide uprising, against the Pakistan Peoples Party in the 1977 parliamentary election.

His early years were marked by his involvement in his father Abdul Ghaffar Khan's non-violent anti-colonial resistance movement, the Khudai Khidmatgar, against the British Raj. He narrowly escaped an assassination in his early years and was later sent to school at Colonel Brown Cambridge School in Dehradun. In his late teens, he became active in the Indian National Congress, with which the Khudai Khidmatgar was aligned. After the independence of Pakistan in 1947, Wali Khan initially became a controversial figure in Pakistani politics because of his association with the Congress which opposed the establishment of Pakistan.

A respected politician in his later years, he contributed to Pakistan's 1973 constitution and led protests for the restoration of democracy in the 1960s and 1980s. In the 1970s, he also served as the parliamentary leader of opposition in Pakistan's first directly elected parliament.

== Early life ==
Wali Khan was born on 11 January 1917, to a Muḥammadzay Pashtun family of local landlords in the town of Utmanzai in Charsadda district of the North-West Frontier province of what was then undivided India. His father, Abdul Ghaffar Khan (Bacha Khan), was a prominent Pashtun Nationalist and founder of the pacifist Khudai Khidmatgar ("Volunteer" in Pashto) movement. His mother, Mehar Qanda Khan, belonged to the nearby Razar village, and married Bacha Khan in 1912; she died during the flu pandemic after World War I.

Wali Khan, the second of three sons, received his early education from the Azad Islamia School in Utmanzai. In 1922, this school became part of a chain of schools his father had formed during his social reform activities. It was from this network of schools that the Khudai Khidmatgar movement developed, eventually challenging British authority in the North-West Frontier Province (now Khyber Pakhtunkhwa) through non-violent protests and posing one of the most serious challenges to British rule in the region.

As a child he acted in a play, Dray Yatemaan (Three Orphans), the first ever Pashto stage drama, written in 1924 by Abdul Akbar Khan, an associate of his father and a pioneer of Pashto revolutionary poetry, playing an orphan alongside his brother Abdul Ghani Khan.

In May 1930, Wali Khan narrowly escaped being killed during a military operation by the British Indian Army against his home village. In 1933, he attended the famous Colonel Brown Cambridge School in Dehra Dun. He did not pursue further education because of recurring problems with his eyesight, which led to him wearing glasses for the rest of his life.

Despite his pacifist upbringing, as a young freedom fighter, Wali Khan seemed exasperated with the pacifism advocated by his father. He was to later explain his frustration to Gandhi, in a story he told Muklaika Bannerjee, "If the cook comes to slaughter this chicken's baby, is non-violence on the part of the chicken likely to save the younger life?" The story ended with a twinkle in his eye when he remembered Gandhiji's reply, "Wali, you seem to have done more research on violence than I have on non-violence." His first wife died in 1949 while Wali Khan was in prison. In 1954, he married Nasim Wali Khan, the daughter of an old Khudai Khidmatgar activist.

== Early politics ==
In 1942, Wali Khan a young man of 25 years, joined the Khudai Khidmatgar movement. Soon after, he formally stepped into politics by joining the Indian National Congress where he eventually served as a provincial joint secretary of the party. He was arrested and charged under the Frontier Crimes Regulations, in 1943, at the height of the crackdown against the Quit India Movement. He opposed the 1947 division of the India and criticised the decision.

His decision to serve in a more prominent political role was said to have been influenced by his elder brother, Ghani Khan's, decision to withdraw from politics. With his father in jail, Khan took over leading his father's supporters. Despite his father's efforts against division and a brief attempt to instead create a new nation called Pakhtunistan, on 14 August 1947, Pakistan came into being. The new nation was divided into two wings (West and East Pakistan), separated by a thousand miles (1500 km) of Indian territory.

Like his father after the creation of Pakistan, Wali Khan agitated for Pashtun autonomy within a Pakistani Federal system, which placed him at odds with government authorities. Imprisoned without charge in 1948, he was freed in 1953; he immediately started negotiations with the central government to allay apprehensions about the Khudai Khidmatgar. He held talks with then NWFP Chief Minister Sardar Abdul Rashid and Prime Minister Muhammad Ali Bogra. He also held a series of meetings with then Governor General Ghulam Mohammed. These negotiations proved successful and led to the release of hundreds of imprisoned activists belonging to the Khudai Khidmatgar movement. Wali Khan next joined the National Awami Party (NAP) in 1956, a new political party formed by his father along with other progressive and leftist leaders from both wings of Pakistan.

The National Awami Party seemed to be on its way to victory in the 1959 elections, when the civilian President Iskandar Mirza was ousted in a coup by the military, under Commander-in-Chief Ayub Khan. One of Ayub Khan's first decisions after he came to power was to outlaw political activity and imprison politicians. Abdul Wali Khan, along with many other politicians at the time, was imprisoned and disqualified from contesting elections or participating in politics as part of this purge.

== Politics: 1958–1972 ==
By 1962, Ayub Khan introduced a new constitution and announced he would run in the next Presidential election. The opposition parties united under the Combined Opposition Party alliance and fielded a joint candidate against Ayub Khan in the Presidential elections. As an opposition leader, Wali Khan supported the consensus candidate Fatima Jinnah, sister of Pakistan's founder Muhammad Ali Jinnah. Wali Khan assisted Fatima Jinnah in her election campaign and served as her election agent.

The opposition's election campaign however proved a failure and Ayub Khan was re-elected in 1964, in part due to alleged vote rigging by the central government, and also because of divisions within the opposition. These divisions were particularly sharp between Wali Khan and National Awami Party President Maulana Bhashani, as the Pro-Mao Bhashani was alleged to have unofficially supported Ayub Khan because of the government's pro-China policy.

These divisions came to the surface in 1967, when the National Awami Party formally split into Wali Khan and Bhashani factions. Wali Khan was elected President of his own faction of the National Awami Party in June 1968. In the same year, popular unrest broke out against Ayub Khan's rule in Pakistan, due to increasing corruption and inflation. Wali Khan, along with most of the opposition parties, including future Bangladeshi President Sheikh Mujibur Rahman and others, formed the Democratic Action Committee to negotiate with Ayub Khan for the restoration of democracy.

Attempting to provide Ayub Khan with an honourable exit from power, negotiations between Ayub Khan and the opposition continued between 9 and 10 May 1969. However, despite a compromise agreement on some issues, it was alleged that the military leadership and its political allies did not want Ayub Khan to succeed. Wali Khan held a separate meeting with Ayub Khan on 11 May to convince him to compromise. Ayub refused, and shortly afterwards Ayub resigned under pressure from the military.

The new military leader, Yahya Khan, called for general and provincial elections in 1970, promising to transfer power to the majority party. In the elections, Sheikh Mujeeb-ur Rehman, Bengali nationalist and leader of the Awami League, won a majority of seats nationally and all the seats from the East wing of the country. (See Elections in Pakistan.) In West Pakistan, the charismatic populist Zulfiqar Ali Bhutto won the second largest number of seats in the assembly, almost solely from the Punjab and Sindh provinces. Wali Khan was elected to both the provincial Assembly as a member of the Provincial Assembly and the National Assembly from his home constituency of Charsadda.

Despite the results, the military government rejected the Awami League's victory. Shocked on hearing the news that the military junta would not transfer power to the majority Bengalis, Khan was to later tell A.P. journalist Zeitlin, "I remember Bhutto said that it had been arranged with the 'powers that are' that in East Pakistan Sheikh Mujibur Rahman would rule, and in West Pakistan, Mr. Bhutto would be the Prime Minister."

In 1971, in an attempt to avert a possible showdown between the Military and the people of East Pakistan, on 23 March 1971, Khan, along with other Pakistani politicians, jointly met Sheikh Mujibur Rahman. They offered support to Mujib in the formation of a government, but it was too late to break the impasse as Yahya Khan had already decided on a full-scale military crackdown. Pakistan's increasing vulnerability and widespread international outrage against the military crackdown eventually created a situation that led to war in East Pakistan. This war proved disastrous and culminated in Pakistan's armed forces being defeated in East Pakistan and the creation of the new state of Bangladesh. Shocked by the defeat, Yahya Khan resigned from office and the military. Under General Gul Hassan Khan, Zulfikar Ali Bhutto was brought back from America and appointed the Civilian Chief Marshal Law Administrator and President.

During the martial law crackdown against East Pakistan, the National Awami Party under Wali Khan was one of a handful of parties that protested the military operation. In one case, Khan helped a senior East Pakistani diplomat's son escape to Afghanistan from possible internment in West Pakistan. The military government, in retaliation against the protests, banned the party and launched mass arrests of party activists.

== Politics: 1972–1990 ==
=== Tripartite agreement ===
In 1972, as the opposition leader, Wali Khan was contacted by Zulfikar Ali Bhutto, who wanted to lift martial law and set up a new constitution. Wali Khan's negotiations with Zulfiqar Ali Bhutto led to the signing of an agreement with the government in 1972, called the Tripartite Agreement. The agreement led to the lifting of martial law and removal of the ban on the National Awami Party. This led to the formation of National Awami Party coalition provincial governments in the NWFP and Baluchistan. Despite the initial positive start, the agreement rapidly began to unravel due to the growing animosity between Khan and Bhutto.

=== Liaquat Bagh massacre and framing the constitution ===
On 23 March 1973, the Federal Security Force, a paramilitary force under the alleged orders of Bhutto, attacked a public opposition rally at the Liaquat Bagh in the town of Rawalpindi and killed a dozen people; many more were wounded by their automatic gunfire. Wali Khan narrowly escaped a bullet during the attack. Public anger amongst ethnic Pashtuns ran high, as almost all the dead and most of the wounded were from the NWFP and were mostly members of the National Awami Party. The enraged party workers and followers wanted to parade the dead bodies on the streets in Peshawar and other cities of the province, and provoke a full scale confrontation. Wali Khan rejected this notion and held back his infuriated party cadres, escorting the dead bodies to Peshawar; he had them buried quietly and solemnly with their bereaved families.

Despite the massacre, Wali Khan continued to support talks with Bhutto over a new constitution. Shortly afterwards, he was appointed the leader of the opposition by joint agreement of all the opposition parties. He then led negotiations with Bhutto for the passage, in August 1973, of Pakistan's only "unanimous" constitution.

Last minute disagreements over issues ranging from provincial rights to the renaming of NWFP, according to federal negotiator Abdul Hafiz Pirzada, despite reservations, Wali Khan agreed to a compromise with the precondition that issues of Judicial independence and provincial rights would be granted by the federal government after transition periods of five and ten years, respectively. However, he succeeded in incorporating Hydel and gas royalties for NWFP and Baluchistan as well as having obligated the Federal government to ensure equal improvements for all regions in Pakistan. Due to Bhutto's party's large majority in Parliament and opposition divisions, Khan was critically unable to stop Bhutto from concentrating greater power in his office.

It was during this period that Wali Khan supported Bhutto's move toward the release of prisoners of war captured by India in the 1971 war and full normalisation of relations through the Simla peace agreement.

=== Arrest and Hyderabad tribunal ===
In 1974, after Zulfiqar Ali Bhutto's close ally and governor of the North-West Frontier Province Hayat Sherpao was killed in a bomb blast, Bhutto was convinced that Abdul Wali Khan, Khan Amirzadah Khan and the National Awami Party were responsible, and in retaliation the federal government banned the National Awami Party. It also ordered the arrest and imprisonment of most of its senior leadership, including Wali Khan. The widely discredited Hyderabad tribunal subsequently put Wali Khan and his colleagues on trial.

Refusing to participate in what he felt was a farcical trial, Wali Khan did not take part in his own legal defence. In response to one of the charges before the Hyderabad Tribunal, that he had been sent Rs 20 million by Indian Prime Minister Indira Gandhi through a certain emissary, Wali Khan sarcastically filed a civil suit against the emissary for the recovery of the Rs 20 million. He argued that, although he could not imagine why Indira Gandhi would send him such a large sum of money, he had never received the money, and obviously the emissary had embezzled the money. As civil unrest was widely spread the country, the power struggle between PNA, Pakistan Armed Forces and Bhutto, including his colleagues, was triggered and, Wali Khan saw Bhutto's actions as his last stand. In an open public seminar, Wali Khan quoted that "There is one possible grave for two people ... let us see who gets in first".

=== Publication of books ===
Although not widely known, Wali Khan had previously written a book in Pashto on his father's non-violent movement, The Khudai Khidmatgar. In 1986, he published another book called Facts Are Facts. This book was written gradually over many years and included critical and declassified British Imperial documents before the creation of Pakistan. Wali Khan, citing those documents, alleged that Pakistan's formation was done as part of a deliberate "divide and rule" policy of the British and that Muhammad Ali Jinnah (Pakistan's founder), along with various religious leaders and feudal landlords, acted on their behalf.

=== Awami National Party ===
In July 1986, Wali Khan and other former National Awami Party members formed the Awami National Party (ANP). Wali Khan was elected its first President and Sindhi Nationalist Rasool Baksh Palijo became the first Secretary General of the party.

The ANP, under Wali Khan's presidency, contested the 1988 national elections in alliance with former rivals the Pakistan Peoples' Party of Benazir Bhutto (Zulfiqar Ali Bhutto's daughter). The ANP's success in the elections was limited to the NWFP and even then only certain regions of that province. In addition, Wali Khan lost his provincial seat to a PPP candidate, a sign of the decline in the ANP's popularity. The ANP-PPP alliance collapsed in 1989 after a perceived snub by PPP Prime Minister Benazir Bhutto and a dispute over ministerial posts and the governorship of NWFP. After joining the opposition, Wali Khan started talks with the Army backed IJI (Islamic Democratic Alliance) and joined the alliance before the 1990 general elections.

== Post-retirement politics ==
After his defeat in the 1990 elections at the hands of opposition candidate Maulana Hassan Jan (a close confidante of the Afghan Pashtun leader Gulbadin Hekmatyar), Wali Khan opted to retire from electoral politics and turned down a senate ticket from his party and the offer from Prime Minister Nawaz Sharif of contesting Lahore. When asked his reason for retirement, he said that he had no place in politics "when the mullahs and ISI (Inter-Services Intelligence) decide our destiny and politics".

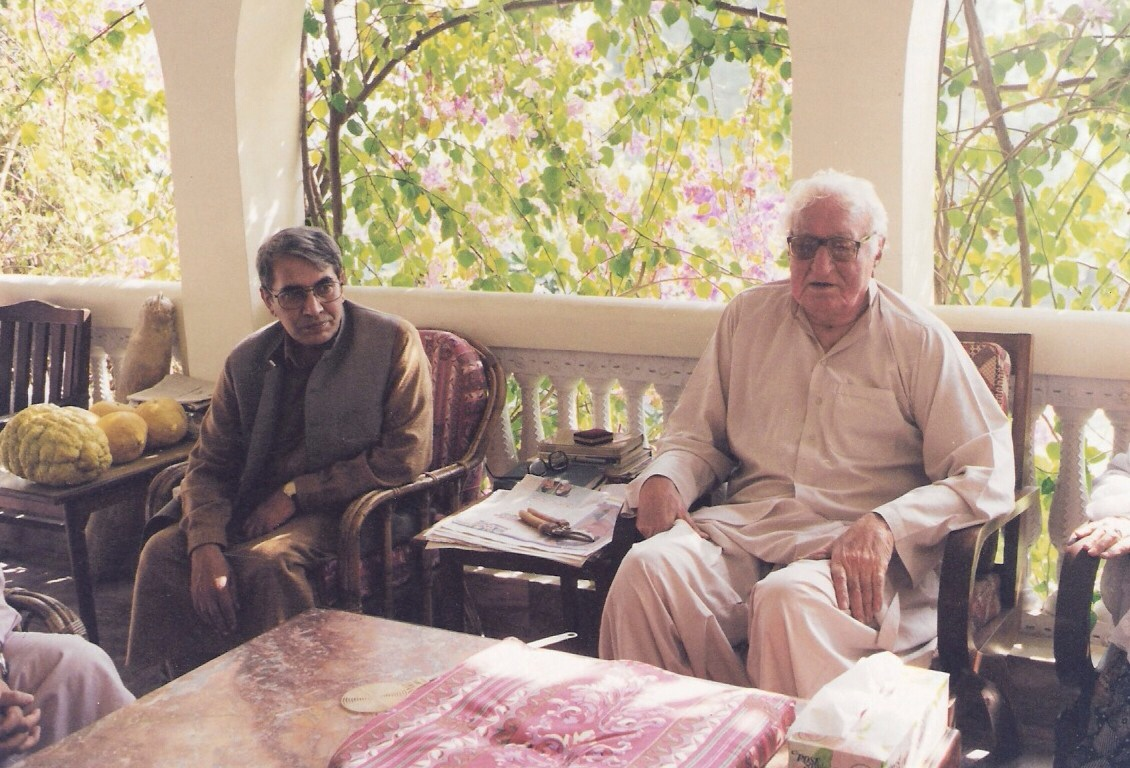
Wali Khan (right) at an old age

As Wali Khan withdrew from politics, his contact with the press and public became limited. This period in the 1990s would be marked by his party's assumption of power in alliance with former army-backed opponents, a focus only on provincial politics, the increasing influence of his wife in party affairs, corruption scandals hitting the once clean image of his supporters and in particular the focus on renaming the NWFP Pakhtunkhwa ('The Pashtun side/ territory'). The exception was in 1998, when in response to Prime Minister Nawaz Sharif's announcement of the construction of Kalabagh Dam, Pashtun and Sindhi nationalists opposed construction of the dam because they believed it would give control of Pakistan's water resources to the majority Punjabis. In response to the announcement, Wali Khan led a massive rally against the dam in the town of Nowshera. The rally spurred other parties, in particular Benazir Bhutto's PPP, into leading a campaign against the construction of the dam. The campaign was successful and Sharif dropped the plan.

In another press conference in 2001, Wali Khan supported the US attack on the Taliban and said that had the US not attacked Afghanistan, the country would have turned into an Arab colony since Osama bin Laden had a well-equipped army of 16,000 people, which far outnumbered the trained soldiers in the Afghan army.

Wali Khan's final press conference was in 2003, when he announced his close friend and colleague Ajmal Khattak's return to the ANP, along with many other colleagues, who had briefly led a splinter faction of the party between 2000 and 2002.

== Relationships ==
His relationship with PPP leader and Pakistani Prime Minister Zulfiqar Ali Bhutto was characterised by a fierce rivalry and a powerful clash of egos. He used to criticise the Prime Minister for his "fascist tendencies" by calling him "Adolph Bhutto" and "Raja Dahir". In exchange Bhutto would accuse Khan of collusion with India and Afghanistan in an attempt to break up Pakistan.

Wali Khan accused Zulfiqar Bhutto of attempting his assassination on the floor of Pakistan's parliament. During Bhutto's time in office, Khan survived four assassination attempts. The attempts occurred in Malakand, Dir, Rawalpindi and Gujranwala. He survived the first attack when the vehicle he was travelling in, from Jandol to Timergara in Dir, came under fire. One of his bodyguards was killed in the attack. He survived a grenade attack at the Gujranwala railway station when he, along with Pir Pagara and Chaudhry Zahur Elahi, was on a visit to Punjab under the banner of the opposition alliance United Democratic Front (UDF).

The fourth attack was carried out when he was about to address a public meeting in Liaquat Bagh Rawalpindi, a stray bullet killed a youth standing close to Wali Khan on the stage. Convinced that Bhutto had orchestrated the attacks with the collusion of Khan's old rival Abdul Qayyum Khan Kashmiri, and after one particularly narrow escape, he warned Bhutto on the floor of the National Assembly that he would trade bullet for bullet with Bhutto, after that speech Bhutto's trips to the North-West Frontier Province were heavily guarded.

Debates between the two rivals remained bitter, in one case Bhutto had just returned from a successful trip abroad, and in a confrontational mood he lashed out at the opposition and Khan for slowing him down. When Bhutto was done, Wali Khan responded: "Mr. Bhutto, you stop telling lies about me and I will stop telling the truth about you.

The brutality he and his family experienced at the hands of Bhutto's government led to little sympathy from Wali Khan in 1979 when Bhutto faced execution.

== Imprisonments ==
Wali Khan served several stints in prison, and survived several assassination attempts during his 48-year political career. His first arrest was under the Frontier Crimes Regulations (FCR) by the British Raj in 1943 for his role in the Khudai Khidmatgar movement. On 15 June 1948, he was arrested again, this time by the new Pakistani government, for the Khudai Khidmatgar's opposition to the creation of Pakistan, and placed behind bars in Haripur jail in Haripur, NWFP. In 1953, after serving more than five years in various jails without being charged, he was released by the central government. During this stint in prison, in February 1949, his first wife Taj Bibi and their second son died in a Mardan hospital. Wali Khan was not allowed to attend her funeral. In February 1949, Wali Khan was moved from Haripur jail to Mach jail in Balochistan, then to Quetta jail in May 1951, and to Dera Ismail Khan jail in 1952. He was brought back to Haripur jail in March 1952 and then released on 14 October 1953.

His third stint in prison was after Pakistani President Iskandar Mirza was ousted in a military coup by General Ayub Khan. The new military regime sought to purge political opponents, which led to Khan and hundreds of other politicians being disqualified from participating in politics. Wali Khan commented about his imprisonment to Ayub Khan's Information secretary in 1969 shortly after the Democratic Action Committee's conference with Ayub Khan had finished. Gauhar writes that, "Wali Khan narrated how Khawaja Shahabuddin asked him on three occasions during the conference, 'how is it that I never met a bright and able person like you when I was Governor of NWFP for three years.' Wali Khan let it pass on the first two occasions but on the third occasion he could not restrain himself and rejoined, 'Because all those three years you kept me in prison!'" This was followed by another brief arrest in 1969 after another military ruler, Yahya Khan, assumed power after Ayub Khan resigned.

His final stint in prison was under Zulfiqar Ali Bhutto's government. Khan considered this period his most difficult experience. His party was banned and a brutal crackdown was launched against his family and friends. As part of the crackdown, his brother-in-law was forced into exile and his son was tortured. In his book Facts Are Sacred, he wrote of this stint in prison with some bitterness.

This difficult experience prompted Wali Khan to be often ambivalent in his criticism of military dictator Muhammad Zia-ul-Haq who in 1977 ousted Bhutto and in 1979 had him executed.

== Death and criticisms ==
After a long illness, Wali Khan died of a heart attack on 26 January 2006 in Peshawar, Pakistan. He was buried in his ancestral village in Utmanzai, Charsadda. His funeral was widely attended by members of the public and senior political leaders including Prime Minister Shaukat Aziz; condolence messages were sent from Pakistani President Pervez Musharraf, Indian Prime Minister Manmohan Singh and Afghan President Hamid Karzai. He is survived by his wife Nasim Wali Khan, three daughters and two sons. Asfandyar Wali Khan, his eldest son, true to the political traditions of Wali Khan's family, is a politician in Pakistan and the current President of the Awami National Party.

Critics argue that Wali Khan made limited contributions to Pakistan's polarized and corrupt political system. They challenged his claim that he was the major or sole spokesperson for Pashtuns, discounted the benefits of the 1973 constitution and the Simla agreement, and disagreed with his principles of not compromising with dictators. Others argue that if he had compromised with Pakistan's military establishment he may well have ended up Pakistan's Prime Minister, but that his principles proved to be his undoing.

Some Pashtun nationalists were also critical of Wali Khan, as many felt that he squandered a chance to unite all Pashtuns in NWFP (now Khyber Pukhtunkhwa), Baluchistan and Federally Administered Tribal Areas into one large province that could be named Pakhtunkhwa or Pakhtunistan. Khan also faced criticism for his "betrayal of his language" because of his, and the National Awami Party, support for Urdu as the provincial language of instruction in NWFP (now Khyber Pukhtunkhwa) and Baluchistan (declared in 1972) rather than the majority languages of Pashto and Balochi.

Wali Khan struggled for most of his life with the twin legacies of his influential father Ghaffar Khan and the perception of his "Anti-Pakistani activities". As a result, he has been criticized for backing separatist ideals as well as causing social unrest in Pakistan. His critics blamed him for alienation of Pashtuns from the rest of Pakistan and for supporting "anti-Pakistani forces". He remained tagged with the title of traitor by the state run media and Pakistan's ruling establishment for much of his political career. Paradoxically he is criticised by democrats for his alleged lukewarm opposition to Zia-ul Haq, who allegedly offered him the Prime Ministership of the country.

However writers like Lawrence Ziring have rejected the charges against him. Syed went a step further, arguing that the clash between the National Awami Party under Wali Khan, "was not a contest between the state of Pakistan and a secessionist force ... but was more like a clash of rival political wills".

His supporters disagree, and believe he promoted left of centre progressive and secular politics in Pakistan. Before his arrest in 1975, he was in fact striving for a more national role more in line with his position as Leader of the Opposition in government and he had started campaigning heavily in Punjab and Sind, where he was attracting large crowds.

In his statements he left an ambiguity in his policies, exemplified in 1972 when a journalist questioned his loyalty and his first allegiance, to which his reply was, "I have been a Pashtun for six thousand years, a Muslim for thirteen hundred years, and a Pakistani for twenty-five." However at the same time, before the 1990 general elections, he stated "The survival of the federation is the main issue in this election. Everyone considers themselves a Sindhi or Pashtun or Punjabi first. Nobody considers themselves a Pakistani. There has to be greater provincial autonomy".

He also worked well with many politicians from Punjab including prominent Muslim Leaguers like Sardar Shaukat Hayat Khan and Chaudhry Zahoor Elahi (father of former Prime Minister Chaudhry Shujaat Hussain) and with Baloch politicians especially Sardar Ataullah Mengal and Sherbaz Khan Mazari.

He was also accused of being a communist, or a secular Pashtun nationalist. Khan's falling out with Baloch leader Ghous Bizenjo in the late 1970s can be traced to his disillusionment with Communism.

Khan, and by extension his party and family, maintained a long association with senior leaders in the Congress Party of India because of his father's close association with Mohandas Gandhi. His preference for dialogue over conflict with India and his links to India also strengthened the impression that he was anti-Pakistan amongst the more strident anti-India elements in Punjab. His opposition to the Pakistan-United States backed Afghan jihad and support for Afghan communist President Mohammad Najibullah damaged his standing amongst many conservative Pashtuns and Pakistanis." Abdul Wali Khan University Mardan has been established in respect to him by Awami National Party government.

== Bibliography ==
- Abdul Wali Khan, Khan (1987). Facts are Facts: The Untold Story of India's Partition. Sangam. ISBN 9780861321872.

== See also ==
- Dr. Khan Sahib
- Ajmal Khattak
- Mian Ghulam Jilani
- Abdul Ali Khan
- Pakistan National Alliance
- List of political parties in Pakistan
- Mir Gul Khan Naseer
- Mir Ghaus Baksh Bizenjo
- Ataullah Mengal
- Raj Wali Shah Khattak
- Khan Amirzadah Khan
- Aimal Wali Khan
- Pakistan

== Notes ==
Political offices
Preceded by Nurul Amin	Leader of the Opposition; 1972–1975	Succeeded by Sherbaz Khan Mazari
Preceded by Fakhar Imam	Leader of the Opposition; 1988–1990	Succeeded by Benazir Bhutto
