= Bacha Khan Trust =

Non-profit organization and research centre

- Formation: 2003
- Type: Non-governmental organization
- Purpose: Promotion of peace, nonviolence, and social justice
- Headquarters: Peshawar, Khyber Pakhtunkhwa, Pakistan
- Parent organization: Awami National Party
- Website: bachakhantrust.org

The Bacha Khan Trust is a non-profit organization based in Peshawar. It is named after Khan Abdul Ghaffar Khan, also known as Bacha Khan.

The Bacha Khan Trust aims to continue its mission of promoting peace, nonviolence, and social justice.

== History ==
The Bacha Khan Trust is an organization established in 2003 by the Awami National Party with the aim of promoting a pluralist, secular, and democratic Pakhtun society. It operates under the Social Welfare Ordinance of 1961 and is registered in both Pakistan and Afghanistan, allowing it to function on both sides of the Durand Line.

== Funding ==
The Bacha Khan Trust is funded by the government of Khyber Pakhtunkhwa and international organizations such as the Hanns Seidel Foundation, the Open Society Institute, Children Global Network, the British Council, and the National Endowment for Democracy.

== Education ==
The organization operates several schools and colleges in the Khyber Pakhtunkhwa province of Pakistan as well as in Afghanistan. It also provides vocational training to women and supports community development projects, such as constructing roads and water supply systems. The Khyber Pakhtunkhwa Department of Elementary and Secondary Education has leased non-functional and underutilized schools to the trust for its educational programs.

The trust oversees the Bacha Khan Educational Foundation, which manages schools in Charsadda and Mathra, a suburb of Peshawar.

== Chairperson ==
- Nasim Wali
