= Khan family =

Khan family may refer to:

- Bahram Khan family
- Family of Imran Khan
- Family of Adil Khan
- Family tree of Genghis Khan
- Salim Khan family
- Khizr and Ghazala Khan, who spoke at the 2016 Democratic National Convention in the United States
- Khan family (squash), Pakistani family of squash players

== See also ==
- Khan (surname)
