= Sardar Aurang Zeb Khan =

Pakistani politician (1899 - 1953)

Sardar Aurang Zeb Khan Gandapur

Chief Minister of Khyber Pakhtunkhwa
- In office 25 May 1943 – 16 March 1945
- Preceded by: Dr. Khan Sahib
- Succeeded by: Dr. Khan Sahib

Personal details
- Born: 1899 Kulachi, Dera Ismail Khan District, N.W.F.P., British India
- Died: 1953 (aged 53–54)
- Party: All India Muslim League
- Parent: Mohammad Ayyaz Khan (father)
- Education: Aligarh Muslim University
- Profession: Lawyer

Sardar Aurang Zeb Khan Gandapur (Urdu: سردار اورنگزیب خان گنڈہ پور) (1899 – 1953) was a Pakistani politician from the Khyber-Pakhtunkhwa province of Pakistan (former name of the province was N.W.F.P.). He served as the Chief Minister of the province from 25 May 1943 to 16 March 1945.

== Early life, education and career ==
Aurang Zeb Khan was born in 1899 at Kulachi, Dera Ismail Khan District in the N.W.F.P., British India. His father's name was Mohammad Ayyaz Khan. After finishing his basic education locally, he received a law degree from Aligarh Muslim University. Then he returned to Peshawar to practice law in the courts there. He was impressed by Sahibzada Abdul Qayyum (1863 – 1937) who also acted as his mentor. He was a founding member of All India Muslim League in his region.

Later, he also served as an ambassador of Pakistan to Burma (now called Myanmar) till his death in 1953.

== Commemorative postage stamp ==
Pakistan Post issued a commemorative postage stamp to honor him in its 'Pioneers of Freedom' series in 1994.

Political offices
Preceded by Dr. Khan Sahib	Chief Minister of Khyber-Pakhtunkhwa; 25 May 1943 – 16 March 1945	Succeeded by Dr. Khan Sahib
