= Khan Abdul Jabbar Khan =

Pashtun activist against British Raj and Pakistani politician (1883–1958)

Dr. Khan Sahib

1st Chief Minister of West Pakistan
- In office 14 October 1955 – 27 August 1957
- Monarch: Elizabeth II
- President: Iskander Mirza
- Governor-General: Iskander Mirza
- Governor: Mushtaq Ahmed Gurmani
- Preceded by: Position established
- Succeeded by: Sardar Abdur Rashid Khan

2nd and 4th Chief Minister of the North-West Frontier Province
- In office 7 September 1937 – 10 November 1939
- Governor: George Cunningham
- Preceded by: Sahibzada Abdul Qayyum
- Succeeded by: Governor rule
- In office 16 March 1945 – 22 August 1947
- Governor: George Cunningham; Olaf Caroe
- Preceded by: Sardar Aurangzeb Khan
- Succeeded by: Abdul Qayyum Khan

Personal details
- Born: 1883 Utmanzai, Punjab, British India (Now, Utmanzai, Khyber Pakhtunkhwa, Pakistan)
- Died: 9 May 1958 (aged 74–75) Lahore, West Pakistan, Pakistan (Now, Lahore, Punjab, Pakistan)
- Party: Republican Party
- Domestic partner: Mary Khan
- Relations: Abdul Ghaffar Khan (brother); Mariam Khan (daughter); Jaswant Singh (son-in-law)
- Parent: Khan Abdul Bahram Khan

Abdul Jabbar Khan (Pashto: خان عبدالجبار خان) (born 1883, Utmanzai, Charsadda – 9 May 1958, Lahore), popularly known as Dr. Khan Sahib (ډاکټر خان صاحب), was a pioneer in the Indian Independence Movement and later, a Pakistani politician. He was the elder brother of the Pashtun activist Abdul Ghaffar Khan, both of whom opposed the partition of India. Upon independence, he pledged his allegiance to Pakistan and later served as the First Chief Minister of West Pakistan.

As the Chief Minister of the North-West Frontier Province, Dr Khan Sahib along with his brother Abdul Ghaffar Khan and the Khudai Khidmatgars boycotted the July 1947 NWFP referendum about the province joining India or Pakistan after the partition of India, citing that the referendum did not have the options of the NWFP becoming independent or joining Afghanistan.

Upon independence and establishment of Pakistan, Khan Sahib joined the national politics and was later elected the first Chief Minister of West Pakistan.

== Early life ==
He was born in the village of Utmanzai, Charsadda, in the North West Frontier Province (NWFP) of British India (now in Khyber-Pakhtunkhwa, Pakistan) to a Muhammadzai Pashtun family. His father, Bahram Khan was a local landlord. He was eight years older than his brother, Abdul Ghaffar Khan (Bacha Khan).

After matriculating from the Edwards Mission High School in Peshawar, Khan Sahib studied at Grant Medical College, Bombay. He subsequently completed his training from St Thomas' Hospital in London. During the First World War, he served in France. During his stay in France, he met a Scottish girl Mary. They fell in love and soon they got married, though his younger brother Bacha Khan was against this marriage. After the war, he joined the Indian Medical Service and was posted in Mardan with the Guides regiment. He resigned his commission in 1921, after refusing to be posted in Waziristan, where the British Indian Army was launching operations against his fellow Pashtun tribes (1919–20).

== Contribution to the Indian independence movement ==
In 1935, Khan Sahib was elected alongside Peer Shahenshah of Jungle Khel Kohat as representatives of the North-West Frontier Province to the Central Legislative Assembly in New Delhi.

Along with his brother Abdul Ghaffar Khan and the Khudai Khidmatgar, Jabbar Khan strongly opposed the partition of India, favouring a united country.

With the grant of limited self-government and announcement of 1937 Indian provincial elections, Dr. Khan Sahib led his party to a comprehensive victory. The Frontier National Congress, an affiliate of the Indian National Congress emerged as the single largest party in the Provincial Assembly.

In the 1940s, a Sikh family was killed in the Hazara District of colonial India, with their daughter Basanti being married off to a Muslim man. Basanti asked to be sent to her Sikh relatives and Jabbar Khan agreed with this. The All India Muslim League, however, agitated against Khan Abdul Jabbar Khan's decision, "and made the woman's return to Islam the principal demand of its civil disobedience movement in the Frontier Province."

In the same district, Jabbar Khan fined the villages of the Hazara District for riots that targeted Hindus and Sikhs. When a crowd of pro-separatist Muslim League supporters arrived at his residence, Khan Abdul Jabbar Khan stated that he did what he considered his rightful duty.

== Politics in Pakistan 1947 – 1954 ==
At the time of the creation of Pakistan in 1947, he was appointed the Chief Executive of the province in British India. Later he was jailed by Abdul Qayyum Khan Kashmiri's government. After Abdul Qayyum Khan Kashmiri's appointment to the central government and the personal efforts of the Chief Minister of the NWFP Sardar Bahadur Khan, he along with his brother Bacha Khan and many other activists were released.

== Back in government ==
He joined the Central Cabinet of Muhammad Ali Bogra as Minister for Communications in 1954. This decision to join the government led to his split with his brother Bacha Khan.

In October 1955, he became the first Chief Minister of West Pakistan following the consolidation of the provinces and princely states under the One Unit Scheme. However, after differences with the ruling Muslim League over the issue of Joint versus Separate Electorates, in the same month he created the Republican Party with the help of then Governor-General of Pakistan Iskander Mirza.

He resigned in March 1957 after the provincial budget was rejected by the assembly. In June, he was elected to the National Assembly of Pakistan representing the constituency of Quetta, the capital of Balochistan.

== Assassination ==
He was assassinated by Atta Mohammad at approximately 8:30 am on 9 May 1958, according to some sources on the orders of Allama Mashraqi, leader of the Khaksars.

In Allama Mashriqi Narrowly Escapes the Gallows: Court Proceedings of an Unpardonable Crime Against the Man Who Led the Freedom of the Indian Subcontinent, scholar and historian Nasim Yousaf, Mashriqi's grandson, provides a day-by-day account of the court proceedings.

This tragic incident occurred while Dr. Khan Sahib was sitting in the garden of his son Sadullah Khan's house at 16 Aikman Road, GOR, Lahore. He was waiting for Colonel Syed Abid Hussein of Jhang to accompany him to a meeting organised in connection with the scheduled February 1959 General Elections. The assailant was a "Patwari" (Land Revenue Clerk) from Mianwali who had been dismissed from service two years previously. Despite his appeal in court, the assailant had not been reinstated to his position as 'Patwari'. "In his first public address after the assassination of his elder brother in Lahore, Abdul Ghaffar said on May 19 that he felt that Dr. Khan Sahib had been done to death by those people for whom he had forsaken his own people, discarded his party and thrown to the winds the position he held as a result of a glorious political career."

The body of Dr. Khan Sahib was taken to his village Utmanzai, Charsadda about 30 miles from Peshawar, where he was laid to rest by side of his European wife Mary Khan.

Speaking of his passing, Pakistani President Iskander Mirza said, about him that he was "the greatest Pathan of his times, a great leader and a gallant gentleman whose life-long fight in the cause of freedom, his sufferings and sacrifices for the sake of his convictions and his passion to do good to the common man were the attributes of a really great man."

== Legacy ==
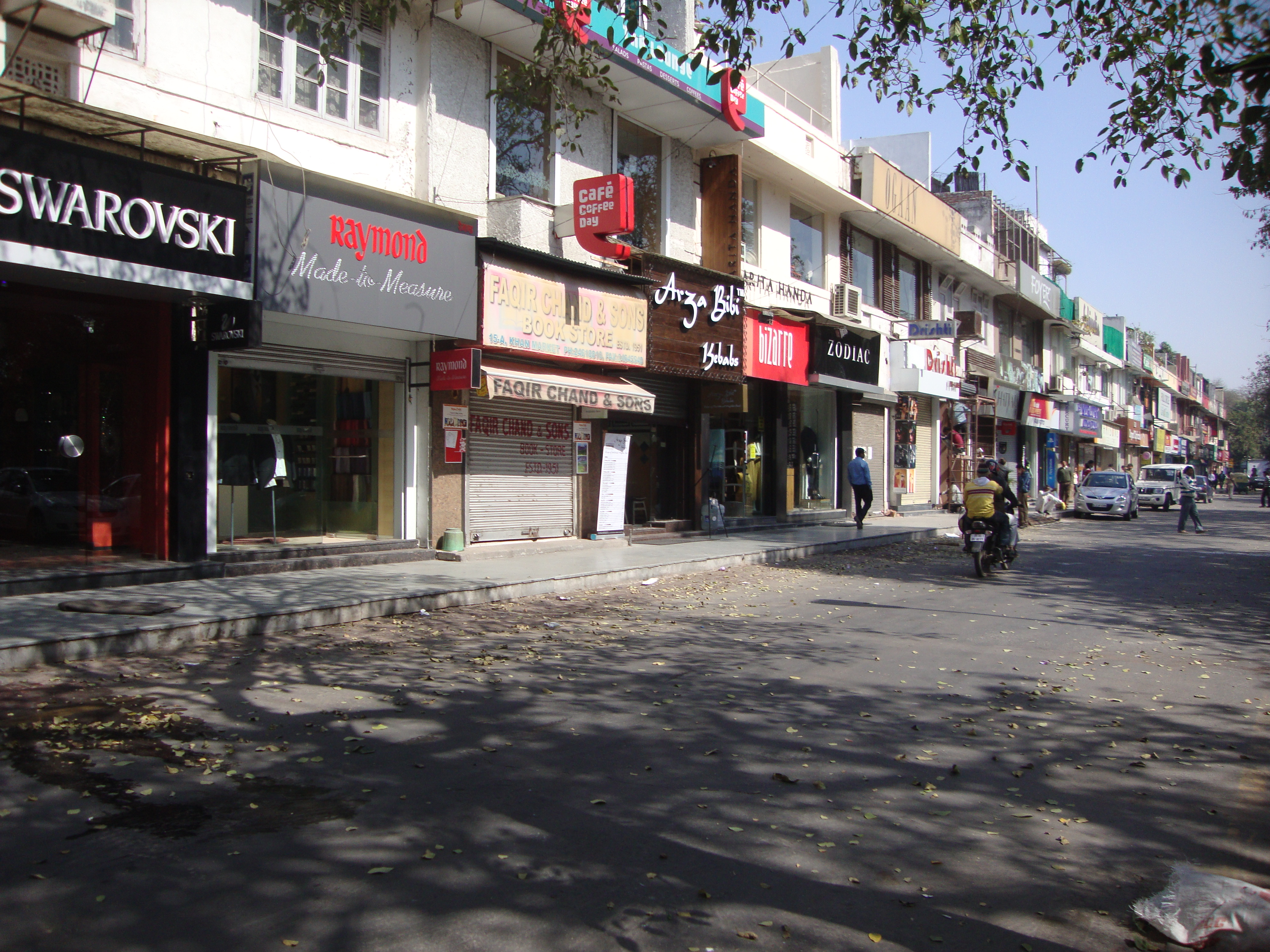
Khan Market is a major high-end shopping district in New Delhi

A major shopping district in New Delhi, India, the Khan Market, is named in his honour. The market was established in 1951 for refugees of the Partition of India from the North West Frontier Province. Dr. Khan who was the Chief Minister of NWFP during the partition had helped many families to escape without harm.

== See also ==
- Bacha Khan
- Khan Abdul Bahram Khan
- Abdul Ghani Khan
- Abdul Wali Khan
- Nasim Wali Khan
- Asfandyar Wali Khan
- Aimal Wali Khan

Political offices
Preceded by Sahibzada Abdul Qayyum	Chief Minister of Khyber-Pakhtunkhwa; 1937–1939	Succeeded by Sardar Aurang Zeb Khan
Preceded by Sardar Aurang Zeb Khan	2nd term 1945–1946	Succeeded by 3rd term
Preceded by 2nd term	3rd term 1946–1947	Succeeded by Abdul Qayyum Khan Kashmiri
Preceded by Office created	Chief Minister of West Pakistan; 1955–1957	Succeeded by Sardar Abdur Rashid Khan
