= Awami National Party =

Pakistani political party

People's National Party عوامی نيشنل پارٹی (Urdu) عوامي ملي ګوند (Pashto)
- Pashto name: عوامي ملي ګوند
- Abbreviation: ANP
- President: Aimal Wali Khan
- General Secretary: Muhammad Saleem Khan
- Spokesperson: Ehsan Ullah Khan
- Founder: Abdul Wali Khan
- Founded: July 28, 1986; 40 years ago
- Preceded by: NAP (Wali)
- Headquarters: Bacha Khan Markaz, Peshawar
- Student wing: Pakhtun Students Federation
- Youth wing: National Youth Organization
- Ideology: Liberal socialism; Social liberalism; Pashtun nationalism; Progressivism; Secularism; Federalism
- Political position: Centre-left to left-wing
- National affiliation: PONM; PDM
- International affiliation: Socialist International; Humanists International; UNPO; Progressive Alliance
- Colors: Mahogany
- Slogan: Peace, Democracy, and Development
- Senate: 3 / 96
- National Assembly: 0 / 336
- Khyber Pakhtunkhwa Assembly: 4 / 145
- Balochistan Assembly: 3 / 65

Election symbol
- Lantern

Party flag

Website
- Official website

The Awami National Party (ANP) (Note: Urdu: عوامی نيشنل پارٹی, Pashto: عوامي ملي ګوند; lit. People's National Party) is a Pakistani political party primarily based in the province of Khyber Pakhtunkhwa. A leftist Pashtun nationalist party which advocates for federalism in Pakistan, its president is Aimal Wali Khan since 2024 with Mian Iftikhar Hussain serving as the secretary-general.

The party was founded by Abdul Wali Khan, son of Bacha Khan, in 1986. It was a member of the Peoples Party-led socialist coalition in the federal government from 2008 to 2013, advocating for secularism, public sector government, and social egalitarianism.

The ANP was the largest Pashtun nationalist party in Pakistan between 2008−2013 with influence lying in the Pashtun dominated areas in and around Khyber-Pakhtunkhwa.

The ANP is a supporter of secularism and strong opposer of religious extremism. Several ANP leaders have been the target of militant attacks led by the Tehreek-e-Taliban Pakistan (TTP). Despite being associated with Pashtun nationalism, the ANP has opposed "Greater Pashtunistan" irredentist claims and remained antagonistic towards Afghan interference in Pakistani political affairs. The ANP has also been critical of the Pashtun Protection Movement (PTM), terminating party membership for anyone associated with PTM, with Aimal Wali Khan calling for a boycott of PTM.

== History ==
Abdul Wali Khan's political career had been built on the tradition of intense Pashtun nationalism inherited from his father, Abdul Ghaffar Khan (Bacha Khan). Although the party was formed after the partition of India, most of its leaders had favoured a united India, had opposed the partition of India and the creation of Pakistan. Most of the leaders were Indian National Congress right hands before the partition of India. Both men were opposed to the creation of Pakistan, and after the creation of Pakistan in 1947, they were imprisoned. In 1956 Wali Khan joined the National Awami Party (NAP), led by a charismatic Bengali socialist, Abdul Hamid Khan Bhashani. In 1965 the NAP split into two factions, with Wali Khan becoming president of the pro-Moscow faction. The party's members participated in 1970 parliamentary elections through the Pakistan Peoples Party's platform and the National Awami Party, forming the largest socialist alliance with Zulfikar Ali Bhutto in 1970. However, the alliance fell apart and its members joined the Pakistan National Alliance.

In 1972, the party was strong enough to form coalition provincial governments, with its partner the Jamiat Ulema-e-Islam (JUI) in Khyber Pakhtunkhwa and Balochistan. These governments were short lived. Wali Khan was again jailed, and his party was barred from politics when the Supreme Court upheld the finding of President Bhutto that the NAP was conspiring against the state of Pakistan. General Zia-ul-Haq subsequently withdrew the charges against the NAP. Wali Khan was released, joined the National Democratic Party, and ultimately formed the Awami National Party. In the meantime, Prime Minister Bhutto was imprisoned and executed in April 1979.

=== Formation and struggle for democracy ===
The Awami National Party (Awami means "people's"), which depends on ethnic Pashtuns (Pukhtuns) of Khyber Pakhtunkhwa (formerly NWFP) and northern Balochistan as its political base, was formed in 1986 by the merger of several left-leaning parties including the Awami Tehrik and the National Democratic Party.

The National Democratic Party merged with several other progressive political and nationalist groups to form the Awami National Party. Wali Khan, the influential Pashtun and Soviet-backed leader, was elected as its first president and Sindhi socialist Rasul Bux Palejo was appointed its first secretary general. From 1986 to 1988, the ANP party was a member of the Movement for Restoration of Democracy.

=== Alliance with Pakistan Peoples Party (PPP) ===
Since its inception, the ANP has been an important ally of the Pakistan Peoples Party (PPP). The party formed a coalition government with the PPP in Khyber-Pakhtunkhwa, and in Sindh province and Islamabad for central government after the Pakistani parliamentary elections in 1988. This alliance, however, collapsed in April 1989 after differences cropped up between the two parties, after Prime Minister Benazir Bhutto ordered a military action that brutally failed. The Awami National Party later formed an alliance with the Pakistan Muslim League (PML) in early June 1989 which led to a formal split in the party with many activists allying with the PPP.

After the election of Nawaz Sharif in 1990, the ANP again formed a coalition with former rivals PML. This alliance proved longer lasting, surviving till 1998 when it collapsed over differences over the building of Kalabagh Dam and renaming the province NWFP to Pakhtunkhwa. It won six seats in the National Assembly in the 1990 elections. In the 1993 national elections, the party won three seats in the National Assembly. It then joined the Grand Democratic Alliance, campaigning against the Sharif government's policies. After Nawaz Sharif's government was overthrown in a military coup by Pervez Musharraf, the party stayed an active member of the Alliance for Restoration of Democracy, until the 2001 September 11 attacks in the United States, when it left the alliance over supporting NATO's ouster of the Taliban government in Afghanistan. The party's reputation was damaged in this period following the arrest of former Federal Minister and senior party leader Azam Khan Hoti.

In the 2002 elections, the party struck up an alliance with the PPP. However, both parties were electorally routed in Khyber Pakhtunkhwa by the religion-political alliance Muttahida Majlis-e-Amal (MMA) riding on a wave of anti-American sentiment in Pakistan.

In the 2008 parliamentary elections, the ANP dominated the far-right wing coalition, the MMA, a party formed by a coalition of Islamic movements in 2002. The ANP has also won provincial seats in Balochistan and in Sindh for the first time in 15 years. It formed a coalition government with the Pakistan People's Party in all three provinces. In Khyber Pakhtunkhwa, the ANP had its first chief minister since 1948.

The strongholds of the ANP are in the Pashtun dominated areas of Pakistan, particularly in the Valley of Peshawar area in Khyber Pakhtunkhwa and it has traditionally dominated Charsadda, Mardan, Nowshera, Peshawar, and Swabi areas of central KPK. On the other hand, the city of Karachi in Sindh province hosts one of the largest Pashtun populations in the world, but the ANP only had two seats in 2011, whereas the number of Pashtuns present would predict them having "up to 25 seats".

=== Recent events ===
In May 2008, Asfandyar Wali Khan made an unannounced visit to the United States in which he and his delegate held high-level meetings with top U.S. officials. A source explained that "the delegation is here as part of a visitors programme that brings important people from other nations for meeting US civil and military officials and members of the civic society." This was Wali Khan's second such visit to the United States, a country where he has several relatives.

In the last decade, hundreds of members of the ANP have been assassinated or became victims of target killings. Most of the attacks occurred in the Karachi and Peshawar areas. An ANP rally in Quetta was subject to a bomb blast on 13 July 2012. The blast killed six people and injured 12 others. It was speculated that a cycle parked behind the stage was the probable cause. The dead included two children as well.

The party has also accused Pakistan Tehreek-e-Insaf chairman Imran Khan and of being complicit in the Taliban attacks.

On 10 July 2018, during the 2018 Pakistani general election there was a suicide bombing attack on political rally of Awami National Party (ANP) in YakaToot neighborhood of Peshawar in which fourteen people were killed and sixty-five injured. Among the killed was ANP's Khyber Pakhtunkhwa Assembly candidate, Haroon Bilour. Bilour was son of Bashir Ahmad Bilour who was also killed in a suicide bombing attack in December 2012. Elections for Constituency PK-78 were postponed to an disclosed date by the Election Commission.

In 2024, the ANP appointed transgender activist Mehrub Awan as Secretary of Transgender Affairs for the Awami National Party.

==== 2025 Bajaur Assassination ====
On July 10, 2025, Maulana Khan Zeb, a former ANP National Assembly candidate, was assassinated along with his police guard and another individual in Bajaur, Khyber Pakhtunkhwa. The attack occurred while Zeb was campaigning for the Bajaur Pasoon (uprising), underscoring the growing risks faced by political figures opposing the Pakistani establishment. The targeted killing near a major administrative hub highlighted the deteriorating security situation for dissenting voices and raised concerns about the state's failure to protect democratic actors. Several others were injured in the ambush, reflecting the broader climate of fear in conflict-prone tribal regions.

Electoral history and performance
General elections	Voting percentile %	Voting turnout	Seating graph	Presiding chair of the party	Parliamentary position
1988	2.1% #4	409,555	2 / 207	Abdul Wali Khan	In alliance with PPP
1990	1.7% #5	356,160	6 / 207	Abdul Wali Khan	In Opposition
1993	1.7% #6	335,094	3 / 207	Abdul Wali Khan	Remain in Neutrality
1997	1.9% #5	357,002	10 / 207	Abdul Wali Khan	In Opposition
2002	1.0% #8	–	0 / 272	Abdul Wali Khan	—
2008	2.0% #6	700,479	10 / 272	Asfandyar Wali Khan	In alliance with PPP
2013 #9	1.0% #9	453,057	1 / 272	Asfandyar Wali Khan	In Opposition
2018	1.5% #7	815,998	1 / 272	Asfandyar Wali Khan	In Opposition (till 11 April 2022); In Alliance with PDM & PPP
2024	1.1% #10	622,115	0 / 272	Aimal Wali Khan	—

== Ideology ==
The party espouses a nonviolent approach to tackling extremism. The Awami National Party, which emerged from the same political lineage, maintained this orientation until its formal break with the Pakistan Muslim League (N) in 1998. The Awami party has historically supported socialism, liberalism, Pashtun nationalism, progressivism, secularism, and federalism. However, its position on secularism has historically varied: following the independence of Bangladesh in 1971, the question of a strictly secular versus Islamic state was increasingly viewed as less central, and the party supported Islamic-oriented political cooperation through its role in the formation of the United Democratic Front in 1973. Its successor, the National Democratic Party, and later the Pakistan National Alliance, adopted platforms that incorporated Islamic themes. The Awami National Party, which emerged from the same political lineage, maintained this orientation until its formal break with the Pakistan Muslim League (N) in 1998.

It joined the opposition All Parties Democratic Movement, and along with other parties except the Pakistan Peoples Party resigned from Parliament in October 2007 in protest against the military regime of Pervez Musharraf. It was targeted in 2007 and 2008 by presumed supporters of the Taliban.

== ANP leaders ==
The Awami National Party is one of the few parties in Pakistan to hold a system of regular internal general elections every four-year period.

- Presidents
  - 1986−1990 Abdul Wali Khan
  - 1991−1999 Ajmal Khattak
  - 1999−2002 Asfandyar Wali Khan
  - 2002−2003 Ehsan Wyne
  - 2003−2024 Asfandyar Wali Khan
  - 2024–present Aimal Wali Khan
- Others
  - Afzal Khan Lala
  - Ghulam Ahmad Bilour
  - Shahi Sayed, Provincial President ANP Sindh
  - Bashir Ahmad Bilour
  - Ameer Haider Khan Hoti
  - Baz Muhammad Khan
  - Haji Muhammad Adeel
  - Qazi Anwar
  - Mian Iftikhar Hussain
  - Zahid Khan
  - Aimal Wali Khan
  - Asghar Khan Achakzai
  - Zmarak Khan Achakzai

== See also ==
- List of political parties in Pakistan
- Kalabagh Dam
- Khan Abdul Jabbar Khan
- Bahram Khan family
- Aimal Wali Khan
- Pakistan
