= Islamia Collegiate School =

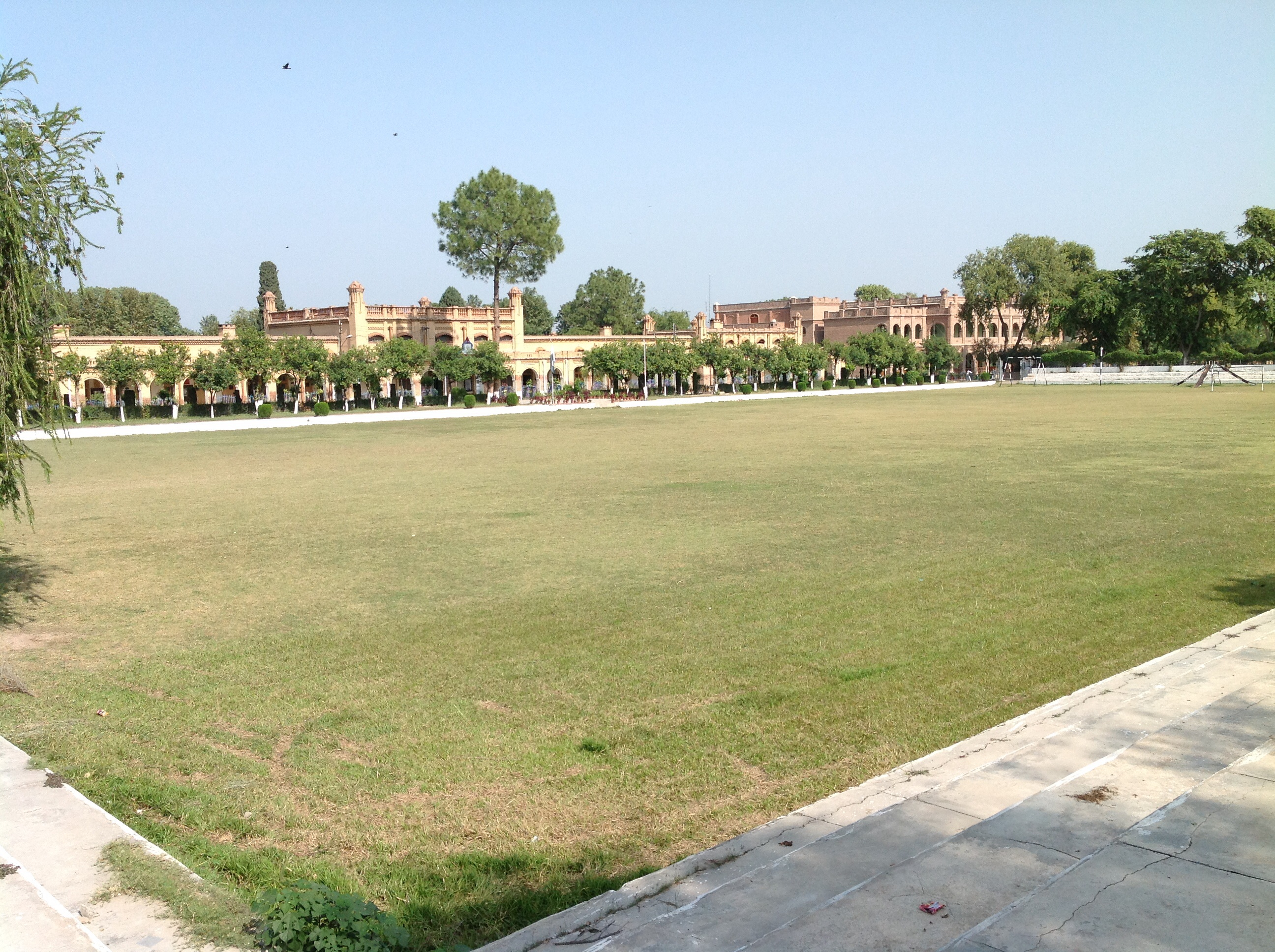

Information
- Established: 1913; 113 years ago

Islamia Collegiate School is a school in Peshawar, Khyber Pakhtunkhwa, Pakistan, founded in 1913 by Sahibzada Abdul Qayyum and Sir George Roose Keppel. It is a part of Islamia College Peshawar.

Dr. Abdul Qadeer Khan (late) "The father of Pakistan's atomic weapon program" also paid a visit to the school.

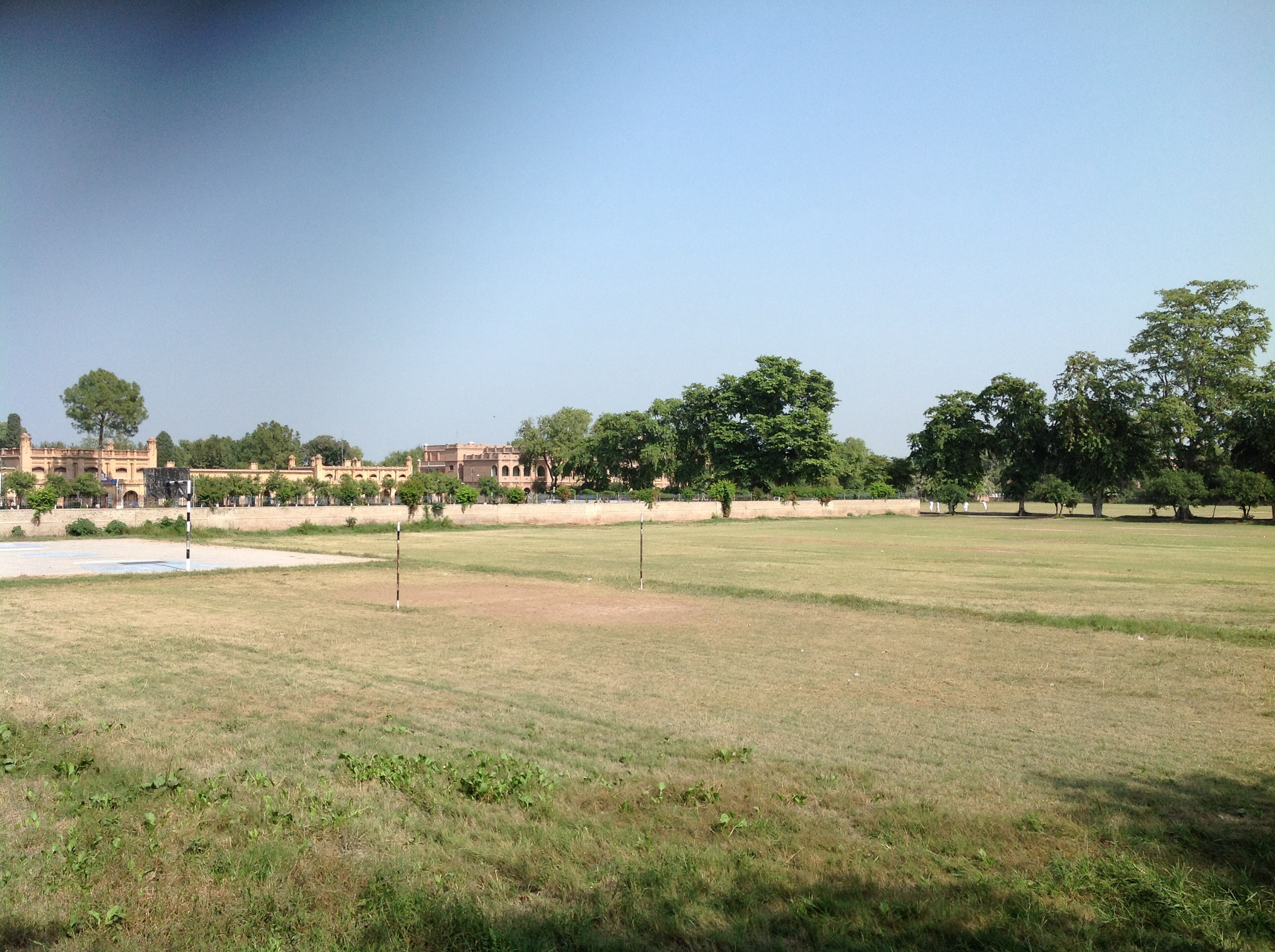
Islamia collegiate ground

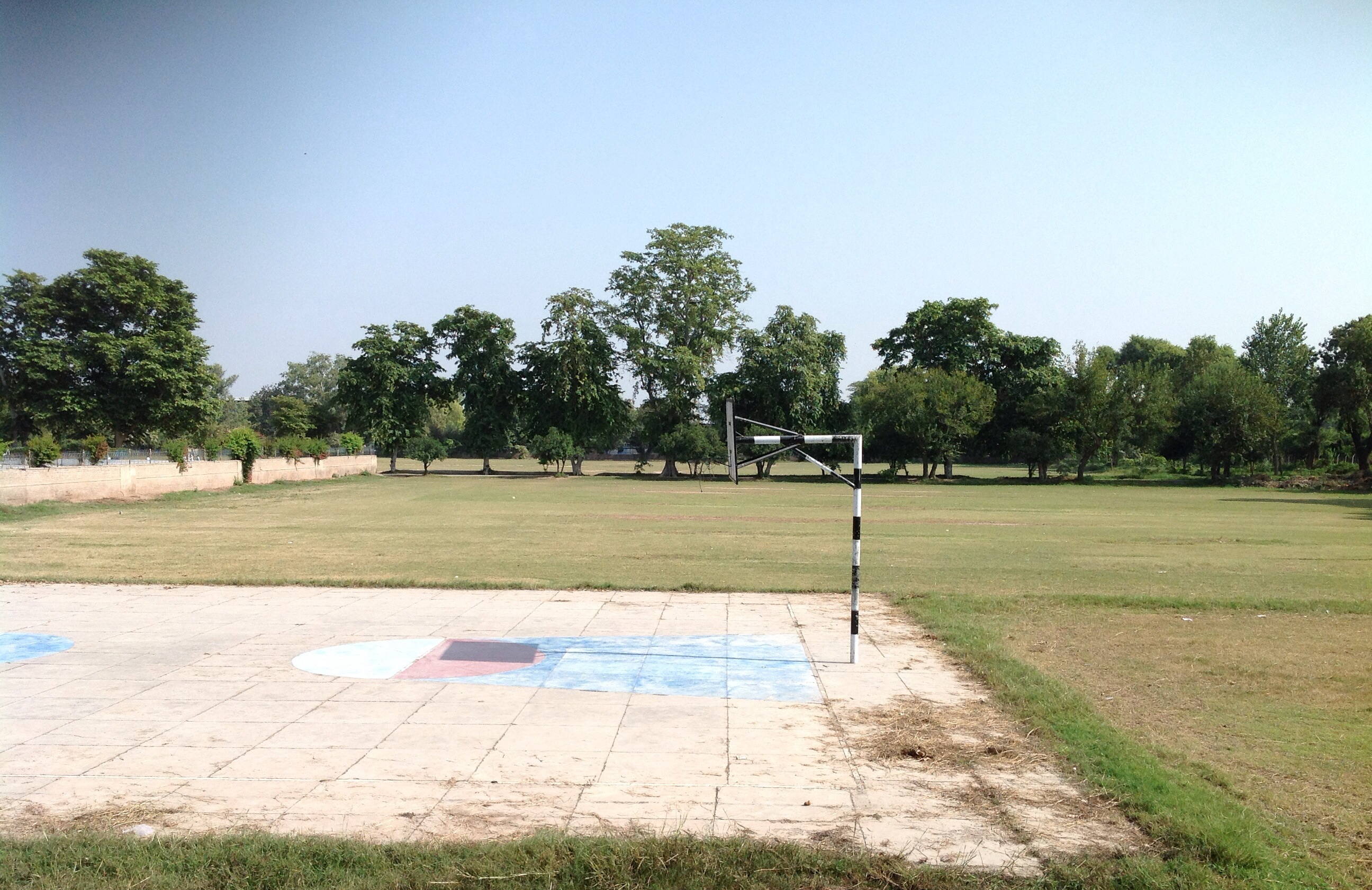
Islamia collegiate ground
