= Taj Bibi =

Pakistani politician

Taj Bibi (born 1946) is a Pakistani politician, who was a member of the Provincial Assembly of Sindh during the Fifth Assembly from 1972 until 1977 She held one of the Assembly's reserved seats for women, having been elected in the 1970 Pakistani general election, when the province was won by the Pakistan People's Party led by Zulfikar Ali Bhutto. She lost her seat in the Sixth Assembly which began on 30 March 1977.
