= Lawrence Ziring =

- Born: 11 December 1928; New York City, New York, United States of America
- Died: 17 July 2015 (aged 86)

Academic background
- Education: Columbia University

Academic work
- Discipline: Political Scientist

Lawrence Ziring (/ˈdʒɪərɪŋ/; 11 December 1928 – 17 July 2015) was an American political scientist and academic. He was the Arnold E. Schneider Professor of Political Science at Western Michigan University from 1967 until his retirement in 2004. During his academic career, he focused on the history of Pakistan and contributed to articles on the geopolitical issues regarding Southwest Asia.

== Life and career ==
Ziring was born on December 11, 1928 in New York City, United States of America. His parents were Israel and Anna Ziring. Ziring was drafted to serve the United States military during the Korean War from 1951 to 1953.

Ziring attended Columbia University for both his undergraduate and postgraduate education, graduating with a Doctor of Philosophy degree in political science in 1962. After becoming interested in researching Pakistan, Ziring worked as a lecturer at Dacca University in East Pakistan (now Bangladesh). He later returned to Columbia University as a lecturer. He was an assistant professor at Lafayette College in Pennsylvania and Syracuse University in New York. He spent 37 years (1967–2004) as a professor at Western Michigan University, retiring as the Arnold E. Schneider Professor Emeritus of Political Science. During his time there, he served as the Director of the Institute of Government and Politics.

Ziring was a fellow of the Institute of Oriental Studies, which lead him to participate in roundtables with various Soviet scholars in September 1981.

Ziring had two daughters with his wife of 52 years. He died on July 17, 2015 at the age of 86.

== Selected publications ==
=== Books ===
- Ziring, Lawrence (1971); The Ayub Khan Era: Politics in Pakistan, 1958-1969. Syracuse University Press. ISBN 978-0-8156-0075-6
- Ziring, Lawrence (1981); Pakistan: The Engima of Political Development. Routledge. ISBN 978-0-367-29762-6
- Ziring, Lawrence (1999); Pakistan in the Twentieth Century. Oxford University Press. ISBN 9780195792768
- Ziring, Lawrence (2003); Pakistan: At the Crosscurrent of History. Oxford. Oneworld Publications. ISBN 1851683275

=== Articles ===
- 1974, "Militarism in Pakistan: The Yahya Khan Interregnum", Asian Affairs: An American Review, vol. 8, no. 5, pp. 402–420
- 1981, "Bureaucratic Politics and the Fall of Ayub Khan", Asian Affairs: An American Review, vol. 1, no. 6, pp. 304–322
- 1988, "Public Policy Dilemmas and Pakistan's Nationality Problem: The Legacy of Zia ul-Ha", Asian Survey, vol. 28, no. 8, pp. 795–812
- 1993, "The Second Stage in Pakistani Politics: The 1993 Elections", Asian Survey, vol. 33, no. 12, pp. 1175–1185
- 2009, "Unraveling the Afghanistan-Pakistan Riddle", Asian Affairs: An American Review, vol. 36, no. 2, pp. 59–77
