= Abdul Bahram Khan =

Politician

Abdul Bahram Khan (Urdu: خان عبدل بهرام خان) was the founder of a major political family, based in North-West Frontier Province NWFP/Presently Khyber Pakhtunkhwah Pakistan. Abdul Bahram Khan's sons Khan Abdul Jabbar Khan (usually referred to as "Dr. Khan Sahib") and Abdul Ghaffar Khan (Bacha Khan) were political leaders in Pakistan.

Abdul Bahram Khan was a land owner, farmer, and the chief of Pashtun tribe Muhammadzai in Charsadda, North-West Frontier Province, British India. He was a great warrior of his time. He fought for the rights of Pashtun nation throughout his life.

== Family tree ==
The members of Bahram Khan family who have been active in politics are:

- Abdul Bahram Khan (1850–1922), the founder of the family
- Khan Abdul Jabbar Khan (1882–1958) ("Dr. Khan Sahib"), pioneer in the Indian Independence Movement and a Pakistani politician, son of Khan Abdul Bahram Khan
- Abdul Ghaffar Khan (1890–1988), also known as Bacha Khan, independence activist, son of Khan Abdul Bahram Khan
- Abdul Ghani Khan (1914–1996), widely considered as one of the best Pashto language poets of the 20th century, son of Abdul Ghaffar Khan
- Abdul Wali Khan (1917–2006), secular democratic socialist leader and opponent of the British Raj, son of Abdul Ghaffar Khan
- Abdul Ali Khan (1922–1997), educationist, the youngest son of Abdul Ghaffar Khan
- Nasim Wali Khan (1932–2021), politician and wife of Abdul Wali Khan
- Asfandyar Wali Khan (born 1949), politician, son of Abdul Wali Khan
- Sangeen Wali Khan (1959–2008), politician, son of Abdul Wali Khan
- Aimal Wali Khan (born 1986), politician, son of Asfandyar Wali Khan
- Lawangeen Wali Khan (born 1988), politician, son of Sangeen Wali Khan

== See also ==
- Abdul Ghani Khan
- Abdul Ghaffar Khan
- Abdul Wali Khan
- Family of Bahram Khan
- Aimal Wali Khan
- Pakistan
