= Aimal Wali Khan =

Pakistani politician (born 1986)

- اېمل ولي خان
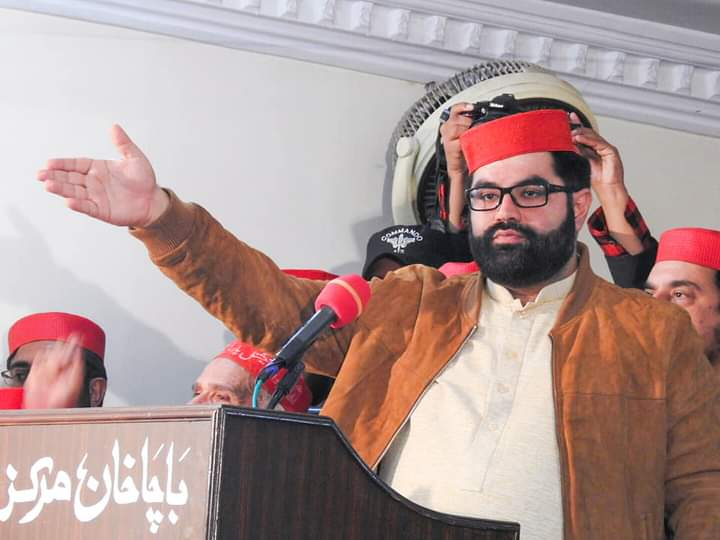
- Khan in 2020

President of the ANP
- Incumbent
- Assumed office 5 May 2024
- Preceded by: Asfandyar Wali Khan

Member of the Senate of Pakistan
- Incumbent
- Assumed office 9 April 2024
- President: Asif Ali Zardari
- Prime Minister: Shehbaz Sharif
- Constituency: General seat from Balochistan

Provincial President of ANP Khyber Pakhtunkhwa
- In office 12 April 2019 – 2 May 2024
- Preceded by: Haider Khan Hoti
- Succeeded by: Mian Iftikhar Hussain

Personal details
- Born: 18 November 1986 (age 39)
- Party: ANP (2011-present)
- Parent: Asfandyar Wali Khan (father)
- Relatives: Abdul Wali Khan (grandfather); Abdul Ghaffar Khan (great-grandfather); Khan Abdul Bahram Khan (great-great-grandfather)
- Education: Masters In Business Administration
- Occupation: Politician

Aimal Wali Khan (Pashto: اېمل ولي خان; born 18 November 1986) is a Pakistani politician and president of Awami National Party, serving as a member of the Senate of Pakistan since April 2024. He is the son of the former president of Awami National Party, Asfandyar Wali Khan; the grandson of the founder of the party, Abdul Wali Khan; and the great-grandson of the Indian independence activist and founder of the Khudai Khidmatgar movement, Abdul Ghaffar Khan.

== Political career ==
He remained associated with the student wing till 2011. Awami National Party holds their intraparty elections every four years. Khan was elected as Joint Secretary in 2011, Afrasiab Khattak was leading the provincial cabinet at that moment. In 2014, Khan was elected as Provincial Deputy General Secretary for four years. He also served as an acting General Secretary of Khyber Pakhtunkhwa. In 2019, his name was suggested for the Provincial President and no one opposed him. His name was suggested by the then Provincial President and Ex-Chief Minister Khyber Pakhtunkhwa Amir Haider Khan Hoti. He was elected as Provincial President ANP Khyber Pakhtunkhwa on 12 April 2019.

He ran for the seat of the Provincial Assembly of Khyber Pakhtunkhwa from Constituency PK-58 (Charsadda-II) as a candidate of ANP in the 2018 Khyber Pakhtunkhwa provincial election but was unsuccessful. He received 22,141 votes and lost the seat to Sultan Muhammad Khan, a candidate of Pakistan Tehreek-e-Insaf (PTI). He ran for the seat of the National Assembly from Constituency NA-24 (Charsadda-II) as a candidate of ANP in the 2022 Pakistan by-elections but was unsuccessful. He received 68,356 votes and lost the seat to Imran Khan, the chairman of PTI.

Khan also writes articles in Pakistani newspapers addressing political issues of the country. He is critical of extremism and terrorism in Pakistan.

== See also ==
- Asfandyar Wali Khan (father)
- Abdul Wali Khan (grandfather)
- Abdul Ghaffar Khan (great-grandfather)
- Khan Abdul Bahram Khan (great-great-grandfather)
- Pakistan
