= Abdul Ghani Khan =

Pakistani poet and philosopher (1914–1996)

Abdul Ghani Khan عبدالغني خان SI
- Khan in the 1940s
- Born: c. 1914; Hashtnagar, North-West Frontier Province, British India (present-day Khyber Pakhtunkhwa, Pakistan)
- Died: 15 March 1996 (aged 81–82); Charsadda, North-West Frontier Province, Pakistan (present-day Khyber Pakhtunkhwa, Pakistan)
- Citizenship: (British Raj) British Indian (1914–1947); (Pakistan) Pakistani (1947–1996)
- Parent: Abdul Ghaffar Khan (father)
- Relatives: Abdul Wali Khan (brother); Abdul Ali Khan (brother)
- Writing career
- Pen name: غني (lit. 'Ghani')
- Notable works: Da Panjre Chaghar; Panoos; The Pathans; Da Ghani Latoon; Kuliat-e-Ghani
- Notable awards: Sitara-i-Imtiaz (1980)

Khan Abdul Ghani Khan (Note: Pashto: خان عبدالغني خان) (c. 1914 – 15 March 1996) was a Pashtun philosopher, poet and politician, who is regarded as one of the greatest modern figures in Pashto literature. He was a son of Abdul Ghaffar Khan, a prominent anti-colonial activist in the British Raj. Throughout his life as a poet in both British India and Pakistan, Khan was known by the titles Lewanay Pālsapay (لېونی فلسفي, 'Mad Philosopher') and Da īlam Samander ('Sea of Knowledge').

== Life ==
Khan was born in Hashtnagar, in the Frontier Tribal Areas of British India—roughly located in the modern-day village of Utmanzai in Charsadda District, Khyber Pakhtunkhwa, Pakistan. A Muhammadzai by tribe, he was a son of Abdul Ghaffar Khan, a prominent Indian independence activist, and was the elder brother of Abdul Wali Khan. Khan's wife Roshan was the daughter of Nawab Rustam Jang, a prince of Hyderabad. He went to study at the art academy at Rabindranath Tagore's University in Shantiniketan, where he developed a liking for painting and sculpture. He visited England and studied sugar technology in the United States, after which he returned to British India and started working at the Takht Bhai Sugar Mills in Takht Bhai in 1933. Largely owing to his father's influence, Khan was also involved in politics, supporting the cause of the Pashtuns of British India. Due to his activism, Khan was arrested by the Government of Pakistan in 1948—although he had given up politics by then—and remained imprisoned in various jails all over the country till 1954. It was during these years that he wrote his poem collection, Da Panjray Chaghaar, which he considered to be the best work of his life. His contribution to literature (often unpublished) was ignored by the Pakistani government for much of his life; although near the end of his life, his works did receive much praise and as well as an award—for his contributions to Pashto literature and painting, the then-President of Pakistan, Muhammad Zia-ul-Haq, conferred on him the Sitara-i-Imtiaz on 23 March 1980.

=== Political Life and Imprisonment ===
During a part of Ghani Khan's life, modern-day Pakistan did not exist. The area was part of Afghanistan, then the British captured it and merged it with the British empire. India was under British rule (hence called British India) and was fighting for its independence from the British. On 14 August 1947, Pakistan finally gained its independence from British India. Hence, before all this independence, the Pashtuns who are now in Pakistan were under the rule of British India before the partition of India and Pakistan. This is where and why Bacha Khan's work was significant.

As for Ghani Khan, he was initially influenced by his father's political struggles and thus worked for the independence of the Pashtuns ruled by British India. However, he later came to disagree with his father's ideologies. He says, in an interview, that he left his father's political movement of non-violence, called "Khudai Khidmatgar" ("God’s Soldiers") because of some of the movement's motives that he disagreed with.

Although he was no longer involved in politics by the time of Pakistan's independence (1947), the government of Pakistan imprisoned him several times, sending him to jails from all over the country. His father spent close to half of his lifetime in jail (44 years out of his 99 years). Ghani Khan used his time in jail to write poetry; his main work in jail is called Da Panjrey Chaghar ("The Chirping of the Cage").

== Works ==
Aside from a few poems of his youth and early manhood, Ghani Khan's poetry, like his temperament, is anti-political. His poem collections include Panoos, Palwashay, De Panjray Chaghar, Kullyat and Latoon. He also wrote in English; his first book was The Pathans (1947). His only published work in Urdu was his book titled Khan Sahib (1994).

The defining hallmark of his poetry lies in its deep synthesis of native and foreign cultural traditions, interwoven with the psychological, sensual, and religious dimensions of human existence.

A translation (Pashto to English) of selected 141 poems of Ghani Khan, called The Pilgrim of Beauty, has been authored by Imtiaz Ahmad Sahibzada, a friend and admirer of the poet. The book was printed in 2014 in Islamabad, Pakistan. It is a joint initiative by individual donors in Pakistan and the Aga Khan Trust for Culture, Afghanistan. The book also contains paintings of Ghani Khan. The Pakistan launch of the book took place in the Afghanistan-Pakistan Pukhtun Festival, in March 2015. The Afghanistan launch took place on 22 February 2016 by the Ministry of Information and Culture.In 1982, At Edwards College Peshawar, Quaid Muhammad Khan (President Of Pushto Literature) introduced Ghani Khan to Sardar Ali Takkar, leading to Sardar Ali Takkar reading Ghani Khan's ghazals to music (Modern Day Tappy).

== Quotes and prose ==
Ghani Khan's love for nature and the local habitat of the Pashtun people is visible in his work. He wrote

- "Pashtun is not merely a race but, in fact, a state of mind; there is a Pashtun lying inside every man, who at times wakes up and overpowers him."
- "The Pashtuns are rain-sown wheat: they all came up on the same day; they are all the same. But the chief reason why I love a Pashtun is that he will wash his face and oil his beard and perfume his locks and put on his best pair of clothes when he goes out to fight and die."
- As a progressive and intellectual writer, he wrote, "I want to see my people educated and enlightened. A people with a vision and a strong sense of justice, who can carve out a future for themselves in harmony with nature."

څوک دې ماته وُوائي څه رنګې شیدا شي څوک؟

څوک چې چاته وُخاندي ولې پۀ خندا شي څوک؟

ستوري د غره څوکې تۀ غلي شان بېګا وُوې

مینې پۀ ژړا وُوې حسن پۀ خندا وُوې

== Tribute ==
Abdul Ghani Khan died on 15 March 1996 and was buried in Utmanzai, Charsadda. After his death, in recognition of his outstanding achievements, the Government of Khyber-Pakhtunkhwa Province built a public library and park as a memorial to him on about 8 acres (32,000 m^{2}) of land, naming it "Ghani Derai" (the mound of Ghani). The site is a historical mound very near his home, Dar- ul-Aman, and within the confines of his ancestral village, Utmanzai, on the main highway from Razzar to Takht-i-Bhai.

== See also ==
- Abdul Ali Khan
- Khan Abdul Bahram Khan
- Abdul Ghaffar Khan
- Abdul Wali Khan
- Family of Bahram Khan
- Utmanzai (Sarbani tribe)
- Raj Wali Shah Khattak

== Sources ==
- Mohammad Arif Khattak: Ghani Khan – A Poet of Social Reality, ISBN 978-3-639-32391-7
