= Haider Rahman =

حیدر رحمان Haider Rahman
- Origin: Lahore, Punjab, Pakistan
- Genres: Sufi rock, pop, classical
- Occupation: Musician
- Instrument: Bansuri
- Years active: 2006–present
- Label: Fire Records
- Website: Official Website; Official Laal Band Website

Haider Rahman is a Pakistani musician and member of the band Laal. He plays the bansuri (flute) for the band. He also sometimes lends his voice for backup vocals. He is recognized all over Pakistan for being a shagird of the legendary Pakistani flute player Akmal Qadri and the famous north Indian classical musician Hariprasad Chaurasia. He also spent some time training with Mohammad Ahsan (aka Pappu).

== Early life ==
Haider started playing the flute at a very young age. His main inspiration was Pandit Hariprasad Chaurasia with whom he spent nearly 4 months in training as a Shagird (student). He has dedicated his life to training for and playing the bansuri because of the Pandit's influence.

Haider is also credited for taking the North Indian flute playing genre to a new level because of his work and performances with jazz, Cuban, Bulgarian, Hungarian and western classical folk musician's while he was studying for a master's in economics from London.

== Laal ==
Haider is a founding member of the band Laal. His main performance comes when he is given a "space" for a Flute solo, in which he plays the flute for 5 to 6 minutes. He has quoted in several interviews that he is not told what to play. He improvises according to his mood and also says that he plays the sound that he hears inside him, and does not play anything that he has played before. He also claims that he does not rehearse before going out on stage. Haider is considered to be a great asset not only to the band but also to the Pakistani music industry.

== See also ==
- Shahram Azhar
- Taimur Rahman
- Mahvash Waqar
- Habib Jalib
- Faiz Ahmed Faiz
- Urdu poets
