= Ghalib (film) =

1961 Pakistani film Atta Ullah Hashmi

- Directed by: Atta Ullah Hashmi
- Written by: Shatir Ghaznavi (story); Agha Shorish Kashmiri (dialogues)
- Produced by: Atta Ullah Hashmi
- Starring: Sudhir; Noor Jehan; Yasmin; Habib Jalib; Shola; Khursheed Shahid; Shamim Bano; Bibbo
- Music by: Tassaduq Hussain
- Release date: 24 November 1961
- Running time: 130 min
- Country: Pakistan
- Language: Urdu

Ghalib is a 1961 Pakistani black and white biographical drama film based on the life of famous Urdu poet, Mirza Asadullah Khan Ghalib. The film was directed and produced by Atta Ullah Hashmi, and the story was written by Shatir Ghaznavi with dialogue by Agha Shorish Kashmiri. The film stars Sudhir in the title role of Ghalib while Noor Jehan played his love interest and also sang songs for the film.

It was the last film of Noor Jehan as an actor after which she shifted her focus towards singing completely.

== Cast ==
- Sudhir as Mirza Asadullah Khan Ghalib
- Noor Jehan as Chaudhvin
- Yasmin as Ghalib's wife
- Shola as Khursheed Bai
- Shamim Bano as Chaudhvin's mother
- Bibbo
- Khursheed Shahid
- Habib Jalib (special appearance)

== Soundtrack ==
All lyrics are written by Mirza Ghalib; all music is composed by Tassaduq Hussain.

No.	Title	Lyrics	Singer (s)	Length
1.	"Dil Hi To Hay Na Sang-o-Khasht Dard Say Bhar Na Aaye Kyun"		Noor Jehan
2.	"Dil-e-Nadan, Tujhay Hua Kya Hay, Akhir Is Dard Ki Dawa Kya Hay"	Mirza Ghalib	Noor Jehan
3.	"Hay Bas Keh Har Ek Unkay Isharay Mein Nishan Aur"		Noor Jehan
4.	"Kabhi Naiki Bhi Us Kay Jee Mein Gar Aa Jaye Kabhi"		Noor Jehan
5.	"Koi Umeed Bhar Nahin Aati"		Noor Jehan
6.	"Yeh Na Thi Hamari Qismat, Keh Wisal-e-Yaar Hota"		Noor Jehan, Saleem Raza
7.	"Muddat Hui Hay Yaar Ko Mehman Kiye Huay"		Noor Jehan
8.	"Nukta Cheen Hay Gham-e-Dil Us Ko Sunaye Na Banay"		Noor Jehan
9.	"Teray Sar Par Dekh Kay Tapka, Teray Tapkay Peh Sar"		Zubaida Khanum, Batish
10.	"Taskeen Ko Ham Na Royen Jo Zoq-e-Nazar Milay"		Noor Jehan, Naheed Niazi

== Release and reception ==
Ghalib released on 24 November 1961 in cinemas of Karachi and Lahore. The film was an average grosser at the box office. Film received mixed response from critics with Dawn praised its production and compared it with Indian film based on Ghalib stating, "…[T]he film Ghalib has aroused such varied opinion. The film, to say the least, is truly enchanting, and as perfect a production as the Indian Mirza Ghalib for which the hero won the Indian President’s Award."

== Awards and nominations ==
- 1961 - Nigar Awards - Best Supporting Actress - Shamim Bano
