= Do Ansoo =

1950 film from Pakistan

Do Ansoo دو آنسُو
- Directed by: Anwar Kamal Pasha; Murtaza Gilani (assistant director)
- Written by: Hakim Ahmad Shuja (story)
- Starring: M. Ajmal; Allauddin; Gulshan Ara; Himalaywala; Asif Jah; Santosh Kumar; Sabiha Khanum; Shah Nawaz; Shamim Bano
- Music by: Mubarak Ali
- Distributed by: Nobahar Films
- Release date: 7 April 1950
- Country: Pakistan
- Language: Urdu

Do Ansoo, (Urdu: دو آنسُو; Two Tears) is a Pakistani film made in 1949 and released on 7 April 1950.

Starring Santosh Kumar, M. Ajmal, Sabiha Khanum and Allauddin, it was the first directorial success of director Anwar Kamal Pasha. The story of the film was adapted from the novel of Pasha's father Hakim Ahmad Shuja, Baap Ka Gunah (transl. Father's Sin).

The music was composed by Mubarak Ali. Do Ansoo became an instant hit and Sheikh Lateef's Naubahar Films, as a result, got some recognition due to the film's success. Do Ansoo attained a 25-week viewing after being released on 7 April 1950, rendering it the first ever Urdu language film to celebrate a silver jubilee in the new Pakistani film industry.

== Cast ==
- M. Ajmal
- Allauddin
- Gulshan Ara
- Himalaywala
- Asif Jah VII
- Santosh Kumar as Aslam
- Sabiha Khanum as Noorie
- Shah Nawaz
- Shamim Bano
