= Mahvash Waqar =

Mahvash Waqar محوش وقار
- Born: 12 February
- Origin: Lahore, Punjab, Pakistan
- Genres: Sufi Rock; Pop
- Occupations: Singer; RJ
- Years active: 2006–present
- Label: Fire Records
- Member of: Laal
- Website: www.aag.tv/laal

Mahvash Waqar is a Pakistani artist and a backup vocalist for the band Laal. She is also well-known for a stint on radio as a radio host.

== Early life ==
Mahvash studied Textile designing from the National College of Arts in Lahore, Pakistan. She had a keen interest in music from the beginning. So, instead of continuing her studies she decided to join what was then a very new phenomenon of FM radio stations.

== Radio jockey ==
She was a well known jockey of many radio stations from 2000 to 2006. She hosted numerous shows and also worked as a producer for others. The experience she gained in radio jockeying brought her in contact with an enormous variety of music and hence she earned the name, Human Encyclopedia of Music. She stressed in an interview that her main influence in music was the classic rock sound of the 1970s.

== Music career ==
Mahvash began her music career in early 2007 when she decided to be a part of the newly formed Laal Band along with Haider Rehman, Aamir, Asif, Salman and Jamal. The band was formed in response to the 2007 sacking of judges by then President Pervez Musharraf.

=== Laal ===
Laal the Band was formed in late 2007, after the sacking of the Chief Justice Iftikhar Chaudhry. The band members along with the public protested against the incident and demanded the restoration of judiciary by the president. The members then joined up together to form a Musical continuation of the Progressive Writers Movement of Faiz Ahmed Faiz, Habib Jalib and Ahmed Faraz. The band's aim is to popularize the works of these socialist writers by setting their revolutionary poetry to music. The current band members include Mahvash, Taimur and Haider Rahman. Mahvash sings backup for the band.

=== Discography ===
Mahvash has played backup vocals for Laal band's debut album, Umeed e Sahar.

== See also ==
- Urdu poets
