= Tand Tand Tarakla =

Dr. Muhammad Azam Samore is a medical doctor and a Punjabi poet. His book Tand Tand Tarakla, published in 2011, contains the essence of Punjabi wisdom and culture. It is all about the hope and human dignity. Dr. Muhammad Azam Samore was awarded with Habib Jalib Award by Sharif Academy for his debut book.
