= Electoral history of Benazir Bhutto =

Elections featuring Pakistani prime minister

This is a summary of the electoral history of Benazir Bhutto, who served as Prime Minister of Pakistan from 1988 to 1990 and from 1993 to 1996, and as chairperson of the Pakistan Peoples Party from 1982 until her assassination in 2007. She was elected to the National Assembly of Pakistan from Larkana in 1988, 1990, 1993, and 1997. She also won seats from Lahore and Karachi in 1988, contested Peshawar in 1990, and won an additional seat from Hyderabad in 1997.

== National Assembly elections ==
=== 1988 general election, Larkana III ===
Bhutto was elected from NA-166 (Larkana III).

=== 1988 general election, Lahore III ===
Party	Candidate	Votes
PPP	Benazir Bhutto	53,425
Independent	Mian Umar Hayyat	43,733
PAI	Pir Haji Ejaz Ahmad Hashmi	4,643
Independent	Mian Azhar Hussain	535
Independent	Doctor Qari Ashfaq Ullah	151
PDP	Doctor Saeed	104

=== 1988 general election, Karachi South I ===
Party	Candidate	Votes
PPP	Benazir Bhutto	62,046
IJI	Jamshed Ahmad Khan	10,730
Independent	Muhammad Rafique	6,598
Independent	Muhammad Younas Baloch	5,360
PPIS	Zahidullah	3,048
Independent	Muhammad Yousaf	954
Independent	Haji Muhammad Ramzan	874
PML-Q	Muhammad Mujeeb ur Rehman	342
Independent	Tajuddin	195

=== 1990 general election, Larkana III ===
Party	Candidate	Votes
PDA	Benazir Bhutto	94,462
Independent	Sardar Allah Bux Jalbani	718
Independent	Riaz Hussain Chandio	339

=== 1990 general election, Peshawar I ===
Party	Candidate	Votes
ANP	Haji Ghulam Ahmad Bilour	51,233
PDA	Benazir Bhutto	38,951
Independent	Ghulam Jaffar	1,507
Independent	Muhammad Yousif Qureishi	1,190
Independent	Benazeer	1,067
Independent	Qamar Abbass	397
PAT	Khalid Mehmood Durrani	373
Independent	Abdul Majid	290
NDP	Qazi Shah Jehan	204
Independent	Syed Javed Hassan Shah	95

=== 1993 general election, Larkana III ===
Party	Candidate	Votes
PPP	Benazir Bhutto	59,376
IJM	Doctor Khalid Mehmood Somro	15,730
PIF	Muhammad Ayub Ansari	5,508

=== 1997 general election, Larkana III ===
Party	Candidate	Votes
PPP	Benazir Bhutto	46,992
PPP-SB	Farooq Ali Bhutto	22,015
JUI-F	Doctor Khalid Mehmood Somro	6,901
PML-N	Abdul Hameed Mugheri	2,952
Independent	Dr. Mazhar Ali Mughal	1,978
Independent	Syed Hassan Ali Shah	1,337
Independent	Mir Aamir Khan Magsi	782
PTI	Abdul Nabi Khan Brohi	596
Independent	Mir Nadir Ali Magsi	214
Independent	Abdul Rashied Jatoi	192
Independent	Allah Bakhash Jalbani	138

=== 1997 general election, Hyderabad V ===
Party	Candidate	Votes
PPP	Benazir Bhutto	47,897
PPP-SB	Allah Bux Khan Magsi	22,290
UNA	Doctor Dodo Mahari	713
Independent	Ayub Bhai	295

== General elections ==
=== 1988 Pakistani general election ===
Party	Votes	%	Seats
Pakistan Peoples Party	7,546,561	37.66	93
Islami Jamhoori Ittehad	5,908,742	29.48	54
Pakistan Awami Ittehad	857,684	4.28	3
Awami National Party	409,555	2.04	2
Jamiat Ulema-e-Islam (F)	360,526	1.80	7
Punjabi Pakhtun Ittehad	105,061	0.52	0
Pakistan National Party	104,442	0.52	0
National Peoples Party (Khar)	97,990	0.49	1
Pakistan Democratic Party	80,473	0.40	1
Balochistan National Alliance	71,058	0.35	2
Pakistan Muslim League (MQ)	55,052	0.27	0
Pakistan Milli Awai Ittehad	46,562	0.23	0
Jamiat Ulema-e-Islam (Darkhasti)	44,964	0.22	1
Tehreek-e-Jafaria (Arif Hussaini)	42,216	0.21	0
United Christians Front	15,918	0.08	1
All Pakistan Christians Movement	15,449	0.08	0
National Democratic Party	14,960	0.07	0
Pakistan Mazdoor Kissan Party	6,652	0.03	0
Jamaat-e-Ahl-e-Hadees Pakistan	5,225	0.03	0
Pakistan Masihi League	4,324	0.02	0
Pakistan Christians National Party	3,386	0.02	0
Tehreek-e-Inqalab-Islam Pakistan	2,807	0.01	0
Pakistan Muslim League (Qayyum)	2,196	0.01	0
Hazara Front (Mahaz-e-Hazara)	1,814	0.01	0
Pakistan Muslim League (Forward Block)	1,713	0.01	0
Awami National Party (Ainee Group)	1,018	0.01	0
Pakistan Qaumi Mahaz-e-Azadi	999	0.00	0
Pakistan National Democratic Alliance	388	0.00	0
Jamaat-e-Ahl-e-Sunnat Pakistan	351	0.00	0
National Muslim League (Muhasba Group)	282	0.00	0
Wattan Party	184	0.00	0
Independents	4,232,679	21.12	48
Seats reserved for women			20
Vacant			4
Total	20,041,231	100.00	237
Valid votes	20,041,231	98.43	
Invalid/blank votes	319,826	1.57	
Total votes	20,361,057	100.00	
Registered voters/turnout	47,629,892	42.75	
Source: CLEA

=== 1990 Pakistani general election ===
Party	Votes	%	Seats	+/–
Islami Jamhoori Ittehad	7,908,492	36.54	106	+50
People's Democratic Alliance	7,796,238	36.02	44	–50
Haq Parast	1,171,525	5.41	15	New
Jamiat Ulema-e-Islam (F)	622,214	2.87	6	−1
Awami National Party	356,160	1.65	6	+4
Jamiat Ulema-e-Pakistan (Noorani)	310,953	1.44	3	New
Pakistan Awami Tehrik	237,492	1.10	0	New
Jamhoori Wattan Party	129,431	0.60	2	New
Pakistan National Party	127,287	0.59	2	+2
Pashtunkhwa Milli Awami Party	73,635	0.34	1	New
Sindh National Front	51,990	0.24	0	New
Pakistan Democratic Party	51,645	0.24	0	0
Balochistan National Movement	51,297	0.24	0	New
Pakistan Hindu Party	33,847	0.16	1	New
Sindh National Alliance	31,125	0.14	0	New
Pakistan Masihi Party	23,050	0.11	1	New
Pakistan Masihi Ittehad	19,534	0.09	1	New
Punjabi Pakhtun Ittehad (Sarwar Awan Group)	17,967	0.08	0	New
United Christians Front	14,594	0.07	0	–1
Awami Tehreek (Paleejo Group)	14,307	0.07	0	New
Pakistan Christian Association	14,271	0.07	0	New
Qaumi Inqilab Party	12,931	0.06	0	New
Pakistan Muslim League (Qayyum)	8,521	0.04	0	0
Punjabi Pakhtun Ittehad (Mir Hazar Khan)	2,489	0.01	0	New
Pakistan Seriaki Party	2,160	0.01	0	New
Saraiki Qaumi Ittehad	2,023	0.01	0	New
Jamaat-e-Ahl-e-Sunnat Pakistan	1,992	0.01	0	0
Pakistan Aqiliati Ittehad	1,969	0.01	0	New
Pakistan Christian Congress	835	0.00	0	New
Hazara Front (Mahaz-e-Hazara)	678	0.00	0	0
Pakistan Mazdoor Kissan Party (Fatehyab Group)	647	0.00	0	New
Jamiat Ulema-e-Pakistan (Niazi)	412	0.00	0	New
National Democratic Party	204	0.00	0	0
Sindh National Alliance (Hamida Khuro Group)	139	0.00	0	New
Independents	2,554,201	11.80	29	−19
Total	21,646,255	100.00	217	0
Valid votes	21,646,255	98.92		
Invalid/blank votes	235,849	1.08		
Total votes	21,882,104	100.00		
Registered voters/turnout	48,952,991	44.70		
Source: CLEA

=== 1993 Pakistani general election ===
Party	Votes	%	Seats	+/–
Pakistan Muslim League (N)	7,980,229	38.96	73	New
Pakistan Peoples Party	7,578,635	37.00	89	New
Pakistan Muslim League (J)	781,652	3.82	6	New
Pakistan Islamic Front	645,278	3.15	3	New
Islamic Jamhoori Mahaz	480,099	2.34	4	New
Awami National Party	335,094	1.64	3	–3
Mutehda Deeni Mahaz	216,937	1.06	2	New
Pashtunkhwa Milli Awami Party	97,541	0.48	3	+2
National Democratic Alliance	64,713	0.32	1	New
Jamhoori Wattan Party	54,607	0.27	2	0
Pakhtun-khwa Qaumi Party	54,144	0.26	1	New
National Peoples Party (Khar)	48,721	0.24	1	New
Balochistan National Movement (Hayee)	47,648	0.23	1	New
Balochistan National Movement (Mengal)	45,228	0.22	1	New
Other parties	107,979	0.53	0	–
Independents (Muslims)	1,482,033	7.24	16	–6
Non-Muslim seats	460,454	2.25	10	0
Vacant			1	–
Total	20,480,992	100.00	217	0
Valid votes	20,480,992	98.66		
Invalid/blank votes	277,187	1.34		
Total votes	20,758,179	100.00		
Registered voters/turnout	51,867,876	40.02		
Source: Nohlen et al.

=== 1997 Pakistani general election ===
Party	Votes	%	Seats	+/–
Pakistan Muslim League (N)	8,751,793	44.88	135	+62
Pakistan Peoples Party	4,152,209	21.29	18	−71
Muttahida Qaumi Movement	764,207	3.92	12	New
Pakistan Muslim League (J)	624,286	3.20	0	−6
Awami National Party	357,002	1.83	9	+6
Pakistan Peoples Party (Shaheed Bhutto)	377,228	1.93	1	New
Jamiat Ulema-e-Islam (F)	325,910	1.67	2	New
Pakistan Tehreek-e-Insaf	314,820	1.61	0	New
Balochistan National Party	124,754	0.64	3	New
National Peoples Party (Khar)	85,121	0.44	1	0
Baloch National Movement	72,354	0.37	0	New
Jamhoori Wattan Party	66,128	0.34	2	0
Pashtunkhwa Milli Awami Party	58,552	0.30	0	–3
Muslim Ittehad Pakistan	49,601	0.25	0	New
Jamiat Ulema-e-Islam (S)	48,838	0.25	0	New
Pakistan Democratic Party	47,153	0.24	0	New
Pakistan Muslim League (Qayyum)	37,723	0.19	0	New
Pakistan Awami Party	31,615	0.16	0	New
30 other parties	88,429	0.45	0	–
Independents (Muslims)	2,690,164	13.80	21	+5
Non-Muslim seats	432,553	2.22	10	0
Vacant			3	–
Total	19,500,440	100.00	217	0
Valid votes	19,500,440	97.75		
Invalid/blank votes	448,829	2.25		
Total votes	19,949,269	100.00		
Registered voters/turnout	55,737,177	35.79		
Source: Nohlen et al.

== Election for prime minister ==
=== 1993 election for prime minister ===
119 votes required
Candidate	Party	Votes	%
Benazir Bhutto	Pakistan Peoples Party	121	62.69
Nawaz Sharif	Pakistan Muslim League (N)	72	37.31
Total		193	100.00
