= Dastur (poem) =

Urdu poem by Habib Jalib

- by Habib Jalib
- Country: Pakistan

"Dastur" (Urdu: دستور) is an Urdu nazm (poem) written by the Pakistani poet Habib Jalib. This poem is also known as "Main Nahi Manta". It comes under the resistance poem category because of its relevance and subject. It is written as a voice of protest to a law introduced by General Ayub Khan in 1962, in Pakistan.

== Background ==
This poem comes as the voice of an ordinary Pakistani citizen who is fed up with the routine encroachment of the democratic process by administrators. This was the period of 1962, when the law to elect the acting president indirectly through the electoral college instead of direct democracy was implemented by General Ayub Khan. The period of the 1950s and 1960s was harsh in terms of governance in Pakistan. Jalib himself sang this poem openly protesting against the law imposed and it soon became people's favourite poem. Dastur became the anthem of protest then.

== In popular culture ==
=== Song ===
Many popular band and singer sang this nazm. Laal Band of Pakistan is one who sang this song and release an album on it. A video of the same have been uploaded by the band on YouTube. Nilotpal Mirnal a poet and singer from India has also sang this nazm.

=== Protest ===
This poem keeps coming to light in every dark period of dictators, especially on South Asian soil and among Hindustani speaking people. It got a new life in 2007 during the lawyers' movement to reinstate the then Chief Justice against another military dictator, retired General Pervez Musharraf.

Presently, it started trending again on the internet when during the protest of JNU Students Union against the fee hike, a research scholar of JNU sang this song and uploaded the same video on YouTube. Then many other singers and activists followed him. Soon, it became part of the protest song in JNU.

Later in 2019, when anti-CAA protests began and police vandalized the Jamia campus, this verse again started being sung by protesters across the country.

== See also ==
- Habib Jalib
- Urdu poetry
