= Dil Jo Bhi Kahey... =

2005 film by Romesh Sharma

- Theatrical release poster
- Directed by: Romesh Sharma
- Written by: Romesh Sharma
- Based on: C'est La Vie by Romesh Sharma
- Produced by: Romesh Sharma
- Starring: Amitabh Bachchan; Revathi Nair; Karan Sharma; Bhumika Chawla; Annabelle Wallis; Malcolm Stoddard; Claire Oberman
- Cinematography: Binod Pradhan; Gopal Shah
- Edited by: Anil Kumar Bonthu
- Music by: Shankar–Ehsaan–Loy
- Production company: Romesh Films
- Distributed by: Reliance Entertainment
- Release date: 23 September 2005 (India)
- Running time: 144 minutes
- Language: Hindi

Dil Jo Bhi Kahey... (transl. 'Whatever the heart says...') is a 2005 Indian Hindi-language romantic comedy film written, directed and produced by Romesh Sharma, in his directorialdebut. It stars Amitabh Bachchan, Revathi Nair, Karan Sharma, Bhumika Chawla, Annabelle Wallis, Malcolm Stoddard and Claire Oberman. The film is adapted from Romesh Sharma's Mauritian serial titled C'est La Vie, also featuring Karan Sharma and was broadcast on Mauritius Broadcasting Corporation in Mauritius in 2003.

== Plot ==
Shekhar Sinha, his wife Sandhya, and their son Jai are one of the many Hindu Indo-Mauritian families living in Mauritius. Jai ventures out to Stockholm, Sweden, to obtain an education in culinary studies and incidentally meets Sophie Besson, a Roman Catholic Franco-Mauritian. They start meeting regularly and soon fall in love. Jai is introduced to Sophie's parents, Norman and Claire Besson. Norman (a large landowner in Mauritius) instantly disapproves of him (because of his ethnicity). Jai feels his father and mother would approve of Sophie. Unfortunately, Sandhya disapproves of her (because of her Catholic faith) and tells Jai to end his relationship with her. The lovers plan to elope, but Jai fails to turn up on the stipulated wedding time in church. Sophie reluctantly returns to her parents to marry the boy of their choice (Gordon). By this time Jai is engaged to Gayatri Pandey to fulfill his mother's wish (who has asthma). Sophie wants to know why Jai did not turn up. Meanwhile, Gayatri learns of Jai and Sophie's love and comes up with a ruse of Sophie's false pregnancy that forces Sophie and Jai's family to accept them as a couple. The film ends with Gayatri leaving Mauritius.

== Cast ==
- Amitabh Bachchan as Shekhar Sinha
- Revathi Nair as Sandhya Sinha
- Karan Sharma as Jai Sinha
- Bhumika Chawla as Gayatri Pandey
- Annabelle Wallis as Sophie Besson
- Malcolm Stoddard as Norman Besson
- Claire Oberman as Claire Besson
- Manuj Tilakraj Gulati as Gaurav Gulati

== Music ==
Dil Jo Bhi Kahey..

Soundtrack album by Shankar–Ehsaan–Loy
- Released: 30 July 2005 (India)
- Genre: Feature film soundtrack
- Label: Tips
- Producers: Lawrence D'Souza, Romesh Sharma

Shankar–Ehsaan–Loy chronology
Bunty Aur Babli (2005)	Dil Jo Bhi Kahey.. (2005)	Kabhi Alvida Naa Kehna (2006)

No.	Song	Singer(s)	Duration
1	C'est La Vie	Sudesh Bhonsle, Vaishali Samant	4:53
2	Dil Jo Bhi Kahey	Shaan, Dominique Cerejo	4:40
3	Dil Jo Bhi Kahey Theme	Caralisa Monteiro	2:22
4	J'ai Bessoin De Toi (Beach Sequence)	Caralisa Monteiro	2:04
5	Kaun Jaane	Shankar Mahadevan, Shefali Alvares	4:13
6	Kitni Narmi Se	Sonu Nigam	6:09
7	Mere Munna	Shankar Mahadevan	5:18
8	Sajna Angana Aayo Re	Javed Ali	1:20
9	Tu Nahi Thi Jab Yahan	Mahalaxmi Iyer, Shankar Mahadevan, Shreya Ghoshal, Sudesh Bhonsle	4:56

== Production ==
The film was shot in Stockholm, Sweden and Mauritius. A Holi festival related scene was shot in Madh Island, it was initially planned to be filmed at the Grand Bassin lake, but filming couldn't be completed there due to time constraints.

== Reception ==
=== Critical response ===
Namrata Joshi from Outlook wrote, "Dil Jo... has been made for the young but not by the young. Though it comes smartly packaged, it's dull, without any spirit or spunk of youth". Anupama Chopra from India Today wrote "At a time when the family values factory, Yashraj Films, makes romantic comedies out of premarital sex, this is old-fashioned". Taran Adarsh of Bollywood Hungama gave the film 1.5 out of 5, writing, "On the whole, DIL JO BHI KAHEY lacks the power to cast a web on youth or those who prefer mushy love stories. At the box-office, the hype surrounding the film is clearly missing and in view of the fact that the film rests on a routine plot, the chances of survival seem remote". Jaspreet Pandohar of BBC.com wrote, "Although fundamentally a love story, Sharma's screenplay manages to inject enough cross-cultural conflict and melodrama into the plot to sustain interest for both Asian and western audiences. However as a romance it should be the star-crossed lovers who hold centre stage. Sadly newcomers Sharma and Wallis, while photogenic, fail to ignite fireworks on screen. Instead it is Dil Jo Bhi Kahey's supporting cast, particularly Bachchan, Revathy and Bhumika Chawla as a young Indian doctor drafted in to marry Jai, that bring passion into play."
