= Anwar Kamal Pasha =

Pakistani film producer and director (1925-1987)

- انور کمال پاشا
- Born: Anwar Kamal; 23 February 1925; Lahore, British India
- Died: 13 October 1987 (aged 62); Lahore, Punjab, Pakistan
- Other name: Anwar sahib Pasha Sahab
- Education: University of the Punjab
- Occupations: Director; Producer
- Years active: 1949–1987
- Spouse: Shamim Bano (wife)
- Children: 3
- Parent: Hakim Ahmad Shuja (father)
- Awards: Nigar Award Best Scriptwriter Award (1960); Nigar Award Special Award (1981)

Anwar Kamal Pasha (Urdu: انور کمال پاشا), (23 February 1925 – 13 October 1987) was a pioneer of the Pakistan film industry and an early Pakistani film director and producer from Lahore.

== Life and career ==
Pasha was a graduate from the Forman Christian College, Lahore, and went on to earn two Master of Arts degrees at the University of the Punjab. He generally scripted, produced and directed his own films, which dealt with such social themes as poverty, love, social strata, suicide, moral decay and death.

Pasha trained and introduced many new faces to the Pakistan film industry who later made a name for themselves, including film directors M. S. Dar, M. Akram, Altaf Hussain (film director), music directors Master Inayat Hussain and later Inayat's younger brother Master Abdullah. He also introduced Pakistani film actors Aslam Pervaiz, Sabiha Khanum, Musarrat Nazir, Nayyar Sultana, Bahar Begum and Rani. In addition, he introduced film playback singers Kausar Parveen, Saleem Raza and film songs lyricist Hazin Qadri.

Among the notable Pakistani film directors, who had the opportunity to train with him and later became commercially successful themselves, were Hassan Tariq, S. Suleman, Khalil Qaiser, Agha Hussaini, Altaf Hussain and M. Akram.

== Personal life ==
He was the son of poet and scholar Hakim Ahmad Shuja and the husband of film actress Shamim Bano with whom he had five children, three sons and two daughters.

== Death ==
Anwar Kamal Pasha died on 13 October 1987 at age 62 but left behind a legacy as one of the pioneer producers-directors of Pakistani cinema.

== Filmography ==
Year	Title	credited as			Notes
Year	Title	Producer	Director	Writer	Notes
1949	Shahida				assistant director
1949	Do Ansoo		Yes		
1950	Gabhroo		Yes		
1951	Dilbar	Yes	Yes	Yes	
1952	Dupatta				assistant director
1953	Ghulam	Yes	Yes		
1954	Gumnaam		Yes		
1955	Inteqam	Yes	Yes		
1955	Qatil		Yes		
1956	Dulla Bhatti		Yes		co-director
1956	Chann Mahi	Yes	Yes		Punjabi language
1956	Sarfarosh	Yes	Yes		
1957	Zulfaan	Yes			Punjabi film
1957	Laila Majnu	Yes	Yes	Yes	
1958	Anarkali		Yes		
1959	Gumrah	Yes	Yes		
1960	Watan	Yes	Yes	Yes	
1962	Mehboob	Yes		Yes	
1963	Sazish		Yes		
1964	Safaid Khoon		Yes		
1966	Parohna	Yes	Yes		
1974	Khana Dey Khan Parohne		Yes		
1979	Wehshi Gujjar		Yes		co-director
1981	Sher Khan	Yes			Punjabi film
1983	Border Bullet	Yes			

== Awards and recognition ==
- Nigar Award for Best Scriptwriter for film Watan (1960)
- Nigar Award Special Award For 30 Years of Excellence in 1981

== See also ==
- List of people from Lahore
