= Mujahid Barelvi =

Pakistani journalist

Mujahid Barelvi (Urdu: مُجاہِد بریلوی), is a Pakistani journalist. As of 2015, he appeared on a daily show titled, Doosra Pehlu, for CNBC Pakistan.

He has traveled extensively worldwide in his journalistic pursuits.

Mujahid Barelvi was the first Pakistani journalist to enter Kabul in 1979, after the Soviet invasion. He was the secretary of the Karachi Press Club for two years in the late 1980s. He has written articles for political journals and newspapers and has authored six books on Afghanistan and Baluchistan. As a progressive writer and publisher, he founded various magazines. He founded Sonehra Daur Karachi in the 1980s. Bankari was a monthly magazine that covered the economics and politics of Pakistan.

== Book on Habib Jalib ==
In November 2011, Mujahid Barelvi wrote and launched a book in the memory of his friend and revolutionary poet Habib Jalib called Jalib Jalib published by Jumhoori Publications. This book was launched at Karachi Arts Council with the prominent Pakistani poet Iftikhar Arif as the chief guest.

Mujahid Barelvi gave insights into Jalib's poetry, personality, political struggle and personal life. Within its pages, Mujahid Barelvi offers insights into his friendship with Habib Jalib and presents a substantial collection of Jalib's poems, accompanied by historical context, inspirations behind their creation, and the intentions that drove Jalib's poetic expressions. This book delves into the profound influence that shaped Jalib's poetry and his motivations in crafting these poetic works. Veteran journalist Masood Ashar commented that TV journalists were supposed to be tolerant and good listeners, and unlike the TV anchor persons seen today, he had never seen Mujahid Barelvi shouting at his guests or imposing himself on them.

In January 2012, the same above book Jalib Jalib by Mujahid Barelvi was launched at Alhamra Arts Council, Lahore with a lot of fanfare and many prominent personalities present on the occasion including veteran journalists Munnu Bhai, Abid Hassan Minto and I. A. Rehman. Munnu Bhai complimented Mujahid Barelvi for having paid off the debt that he owed to Habib Jalib as a friend by writing this book.

== See also ==
- List of Pakistani journalists
- Habib Jalib (a friend of Mujahid Barelvi)
