= Pakhtunkhwa Mazdoor Kisan Party =

- Leader: Sher Ali Bacha
- Founder: Sher Ali Bacha
- Founded: 1979
- Dissolved: 1989
- Split from: Mazdoor Kisan Party
- Merged into: Pashtunkhwa Milli Awami Party
- Ideology: Pashtun nationalism

The Pakhtunkhwa Mazdoor Kisan Party (PMKP) or Pukhtoonkhwa Mazdoor Kissan Party was a Pashtun nationalist political party in Pakistan. It was formed by Sher Ali Bacha in 1979, as a split from the Maoist Mazdoor Kisan Party.

In 1989, PMKP merged into the Pashtunkhwa National Awami Party of Mahmood Khan Achakzai to create the Pashtunkhwa Milli Awami Party (PMAP), with Mahmood Khan Achakzai as the chairman and Sher Ali Bacha as the General Secretary.
