= Claire Oberman =

Dutch-born New Zealand actress (born 1956)

- Born: 1956 (age 69–70); Netherlands
- Years active: 1977–2015

Claire Oberman (born 1956) is a Dutch-born New Zealand actress, known for her role as Australian nurse Kate Norris in the television drama Tenko. She has appeared in the television series Fortunes of War, Gentlemen and Players, Hi-de-Hi! and The Two Ronnies, and in the films Goodbye Pork Pie, Patriot Games and Dil Jo Bhi Kahey.... Overman lives in London.

== Career ==
Oberman first appeared on television in the 1976 drama Hunter's Gold. She is best known for her role in three seasons of Tenko, playing Australian nurse Kate Norris.

Her other TV appearances include the 1987 series Fortunes of War as Mortimer, the 1986 series Paradise Postponed as Lonnie, the 1980s series Gentlemen and Players, as Alex Farrell in Trainer (1991), as Mrs. Jeffrey Fairbrother in Hi-de-Hi!. She played Sarah in To Be the Best, and appeared in Bugs (1995) and Eleventh Hour (2006).

Oberman's film appearances include the role Shirl in the film Goodbye Pork Pie in 1981. She also appeared in the films Patriot Games (1992), and Dil Jo Bhi Kahey... (2005), and starred in the German TV play Das schöne Ende dieser Welt (1983). She also appeared in the TV show The Two Ronnies.

== Biography ==
Oberman was raised in the rural township of Te Aroha in New Zealand where her parents owned a sports and toy store. She studied at Toi Whakaari: New Zealand Drama School, where she graduated with a Diploma in Acting in 1975. She currently works as a writer and an actress, residing in London.

== Filmography ==
Year	Title	Role	Notes
1980	Goodbye Pork Pie	Shirl	
1992	Patriot Games	Lady Holmes	
1999	The Colour of Funny	Petula Aldwin	
2005	Dil Jo Bhi Kahey...	Claire Besson	
