= Communist Mazdoor Kissan Party =

Communist Mazdoor Kissan Party کمیونسٹ مزدور کسان پارٹی
- Abbreviation: CMKP
- President: Hkmat Shaw
- Founded: 1995
- Dissolved: 20 December 2015
- Merged into: MKP
- Ideology: Communism; Marxism–Leninism; Anti-revisionism
- Political position: Far-left
- Colours: Red

Party flag

Website
- cmkp.wordpress.com

The Communist Mazdoor Kissan Party (Urdu: کمیونسٹ مزدور کسان پارٹی, lit. 'Communist Workers and Peasants Party') was a minor political party in Pakistan formed in 1995 by the unification of the Communist Party of Pakistan (CPP) and the Major Ishaque faction of the Mazdoor Kisan Party (MKP).

In 2015, it merged with the Pakistan Mazdoor Kissan Party, forming the current Mazdoor Kisan Party which is headed by Afzal Khamosh.

== History ==
The break-up of the Soviet Union had an enormous impact on the left in Pakistan, as elsewhere in the world. A great number of factions abandoned Marxism and the Communist movement. At this difficult juncture in history the CPP and Major Ishaque's MKP group (one of three factions resulting from a split in the MKP in 1978) came together to engage in criticism and self-criticism and form the Communist Mazdoor Kissan Party in 1995.

In 1999, much of the former Communist Party of Pakistan broke away and reconstituted itself as a separate party.

In 2003, after further organizational problems and ideological disagreements, a large section of the Communist Mazdoor Kissan Party separated and reformed the Major Ishaque MKP group, whereas a group led by Sufi Abdul Khaliq Baloch and Taimur Rahman remained aligned with CMKP and its Marxist–Leninist program.

In late 2009, CMKP faced yet another split when several long-time members, including Sufi Abdul Khaliq Baloch, separated from the party and joined the Workers Party of Pakistan, a broad-left political party. CMKP continued as a distinct Marxist–Leninist-Stalinist Party. Taimur Rahman, the former General Secretary of the CMKP, stopped working with and being a part of CMKP. Instead, the party was led by central committee member Mehfoz Khan Shujaat from Multan, with Hkmat Shaw from Hashtnagar as party president.

On 14 February 2015, it merged with Peoples National Congress to form Peoples Mazdoor Kissan Party.

On 20 December 2015, Peoples Mazdoor Kissan Party merged with Pakistan Mazdoor Kissan Party forming a new party named Mazdoor Kissan Party.

== Politics and influence ==
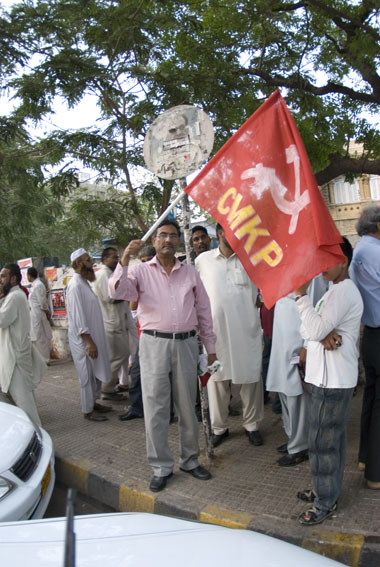
An activist from the Communist Mazdoor Kissan Party (CMKP) at a rally in Karachi, 2008

The party's politics were based on Major Ishaq's philosophy, and were focused on working with the peasantry of Pakistan. It arranged study circles regularly throughout the country and had an official circular named Awami Morcha, which was edited by Mehfoz Khan Shujaat and published regularly.

CMKP saw the China–Pakistan Economic Corridor as a neocolonization of Pakistan and believed it would damage the people of Pakistan.

== See also ==
- Politics of Pakistan
- List of anti-revisionist groups
