= Romesh Sharma =

Indian film producer, actor and director

- Occupations: Film Producer, Actor, Director
- Years active: 1972–present
- Spouse: Sujata Sharma
- Children: Karan Sharma, Neema Sharma and Nakul Sharma
- Relatives: Ayaan Ali Khan (son-in-law)

Romesh Brij Sharma (born July 27, 1947) is an Indian film producer, actor and director. Under his banner Romesh Films, he has been actively involved in the production of films and television shows for over 30 years.

== Personal life ==
His son Karan Sharma is also an actor and has worked in Indian and Mauritian films/television shows. His daughter Neema Sharma is married to Ayaan Ali Khan, the son of sarod player Amjad Ali Khan.

== Career ==
One of the most notable films produced by Romesh Sharma was the 1991 film Hum starring Amitabh Bachchan. In that movie, he also played a small role of Jumalina Gonsalves' (played by Kimi Katkar) brother. In 1987 he produced Diljalaa starring Jackie Shroff. The film Dil Jo Bhi Kahey... that he directed featured Annabelle Wallis and Romesh's son Karan Sharma. He became known for his acting role in 1972 American film Siddhartha, directed by Conrad Rooks.

In the 1980s his company Sharma Limited founded Cloud 9 Studio at Le Goulet, Baie du Tombeau on the north-western coast of Mauritius. Several movies and advertisement clips were made at Cloud 9 Studio by various movie-makers from South Africa, Japan, India and Mauritius. These include Dil Jo Bhi Kahey, Kuch Kuch Hota Hai, Armaan, Hello Brother, and Kuch na Kaho. However, in 2014 Sharma Limited announced plans to demolish the studio in order to re-develop the site into a 3-star hotel.

== Filmography ==
The list of films that Romesh Sharma has produced, directed or acted in includes the following:

- 2005 Dil Jo Bhi Kahey
- 2003 C'est La Vie (Mauritian TV Series) (TV series "Such is Life")
- 1994 Suhaag
- 1991 Hum
- 1987 Diljalaa
- 1986 Mera Dharam
- 1985 Aitbaar
- 1983 Lal Chunariyaa (actor under director Sundershan Lal)
- 1980 Teen Ekkey (director Joginder)
- 1980 The Burning Train
- 1977 Nachdi Jawani as Denu (Punjabi Movie)
- 1977 Chhota Baap (director: Shantilal Soni)
- 1976 Aaj Ka Ye Ghar
- 1976 Sajjo Rani
- 1976 Fauji (director: Joginder)
- 1976 Koi Jeeta Koi Hara (director: Samir Ganguly)
- 1975 Sunehra Sansar (director: Adurthi Subba Rao)
- 1974 Parinay (director: Kantilal Rathod)
- 1974 Alingan (director: C.L. Dheer)
- 1972 Siddhartha (director: Conrad Rooks)
