= Pehle Aap =

- Directed by: A. R. Kardar
- Starring: Shamim Bano; Wasti; Jeevan; Anwar Hussain
- Music by: Naushad
- Production company: Kardar Productions
- Release date: 1944
- Country: India
- Language: Hindi

Pehle Aap (Transl. You First) is a Bollywood film. It was released in 1944.

== Cast ==
- Shamim as Shameem
- Anwar Hussain

The song "Hindustan Ke Hum Hain" is widely accepted as the first song sung by Muhammad Rafi.
