= Hoti, Mardan =

Union council in Khyber Pakhtunkhwa

Hoti
- Union council
- Interactive map of Hoti
- Coordinates: 34°12′00″N 72°04′00″E
- Country: Pakistan
- Province: Khyber-Pakhtunkhwa
- District: Mardan

Hoti (Pashto: هوتي, pronounced Hoti/Hoty or Ooty) is a union council in the Mardan district, Khyber Pakhtunkhwa. The town is located at 34°12'0N°, 72°4'0E at an altitude of 284 metres (935 feet) and lies just east of Peshawar, the capital of the province.

== Notable people ==
- Sher Ali Bacha (1935–1998), Pashtun nationalist politician
- Kaleem Ur Rehman Bacha (1962), Participatory community development & conservation specialist, worked on the projects of leading international organization i.e. GIZ, IUCN, USAID in the northern Pakistan, particularly in Upper Dir, Upper Swat, Upper Chitral & Gilgit Baltistan. Nutrition & WASH assistance across the country with the financial assistance of Unicef & World Food Program.
- Ibrahim Peshawari (1850–1930), Islamic scholar in Bengal
