= Mazdoor Kisan Party =

Mazdoor Kisan Party مزدور کسان پارٹی
- Pashto name: مزدور کِسان ګوند
- Chairman: Kamil Bangash
- Secretary-General: Taimur Rahman
- Founders: Afzal Bangash; Sher Ali Bacha
- Founded: 20 December 2015; 10 years ago
- Split from: National Awami Party (Wali)
- Preceded by: PMKP; CMKP
- Ideology: Communism; Marxism-Leninism
- Political position: Far-left
- National affiliation: Left Democratic Front; TTAP
- International affiliation: World Anti-Imperialist Platform
- Colors: Red

Party flag

Website
- mkp.org.pk

The Mazdoor Kisan Party (MKP; Pashto: مزدور کِسان ګوند; Urdu: مزدور کسان پارٹی; lit. "Workers and Farmers Party") is a Marxist-Leninist party in Pakistan. It was founded on 1 May 1968 by Afzal Bangash and Sher Ali Bacha. Other prominent leaders included Ishaq Muhammad and Imtiaz Alam. In the 1970s, the MKP led a militant communist movement in Hashtnagar, Charsadda District, Khyber Pakhtunkhwa (then known as the North-West Frontier Province).

On 20 December 2015, the Pakistan Mazdoor Kissan Party (PMKP) and the Communist Mazdoor Kissan Party (CMKP) were merged to form the current MKP. The chairman of the MKP is Afzal Khamosh, a revolutionary leader from Charsadda District, while the Secretary-General is Taimur Rahman.

== History ==
=== Creation ===
At the end of 1967, the National Awami Party (NAP) split into two factions, and the leftist members, many of whom were active in a Kisan (peasant) Committee, decided to follow the Abdul Wali Khan faction. However, the leadership of the Wali Khan faction, being landlords, soon decided not to allow members of the NAP to also be members of the Kisan Committee. Thus the leftists, led by Afzal Bangash, decided to leave the NAP and establish the MKP. On 1 May 1968, at a meeting in Peshawar, the Mazdoor Kisan Party was formed with Afzal Bangash as the leader and Sher Ali Bacha as the General Secretary.

=== Early history ===
The MKP soon started to work together with several factions, including the Major Ishaq Muhammad group in Punjab and other leftist groups in East Pakistan (present-day Bangladesh). In 1970, the Ishaq group merged with the Mazdoor Kisan Party.

The party's main focus was on the peasantry, inspired by the struggles of the Chinese, Vietnamese and African people. It achieved immediate success in the North West Frontier Province (NWFP) of Pakistan, where spontaneous struggles between peasants and landlords were already taking place due to Ayub Khan's land reforms and imposition of farm machinery. The MKP provided the organisation and leadership needed by the peasant rebellion and in turn the movement gained tremendous following in the late 1960s and early 1970s. The movement was not only facing the private armies of the landlords but also attempts by the state to stop it by force. The fight continued through three governments: Yahya Khan's military regime, the NAP-Jamiat Ulema-e-Islam government and the provincial government of the Pakistan Peoples Party (PPP). Soon even the landlords belonging to the different parties banded together in the Ittehad Party in order to crush the rebellion.

The provincial NAP-JUI stood firmly behind the landlords in the struggle and, failing to get the central government to establish a ban on the MKP, tried to smear the party by putting forward the notion that Zulfikar Ali Bhutto had initiated the peasant movement. Still, the government of NAP-JUI fell and the MKP continued on, now having to deal with the PPP.

One of the greatest clashes between the peasantry and the state took place in July 1971 at Mandani. In a daylong pitched battle, an army of 1500 heavily armed policemen were routed with a casualty rate of about 20 peasants and party cadres on the MKP side. Another struggle took place at the end of the NAP-JUI government period. Around 8000 militia and Rangers were deployed in the Malakand Agency in order to stop the MKP. During this time the party's vice-president Maulvi Mohammad Sadiq was assassinated.

=== Boycott of Pakistani general elections ===
The MKP ignored parliamentary and bourgeois forms of democratic struggle and did not participate in the 1970 General Election in Pakistan. It condemned military action against Bengalis during the emergence of Bangladesh and, at the same time, struggled for the breaking up of One Unit in West Pakistan. The question of nationality in Pakistan was not addressed properly by the MKP, and it also failed to organise in Sindh and Baluchistan. Still, the MKP had strong support among the peasantry of the Peshawar and Mardan districts, the Malakand Agency and the former states of Swat and Dir. It also had built support for itself in parts of Hazara and Punjab.

The first national congress of the party was held in May 1973 at Shergarh in the Mardan District. Armed security guards were placed around the area, and a strike of bus owners was set off by opposing forces in order to prevent people from attending the national congress. This failed, though, as 5000 delegates, helped by disobeying drivers and the MKP militants, attended the congress. An energetic debate took place during which Major Ishaq Muhammad was elected as president of the party and Sher Ali Bacha as General Secretary.

=== Party elections and internal differences ===
As in 1970, the MKP again did not participate in the 1977 Pakistani general election, although, at that time, it had good prospects of making some progress in national politics of Pakistan. Instead it held the slogan of "Intikhab Naheen, Inqilab" (Revolution, not elections) and organised mass rallies following a relaxation of political restrictions. Around 50000 people participated in Peshawar and 30000 in Shergarh, demonstrating the grass-root support of the masses for the MKP.

The aftermath of the March 1977 elections was one of frustration for the cadres of the MKP. The government was accused by the right-wing Pakistan National Alliance (PNA) of rigging the elections, and the country was basically polarised between supporters and opponents of Bhutto. The MKP, as well as the rest of the left in Pakistan, was mostly powerless in this major crisis, crying out for civil liberties while at the same time labelling PNA as reactionary.

The MKP was further isolated when a number of leftist parties in Pakistan formed a coalition by the name of Awami Jamhuri Ittehad Pakistan (AJIP) (People's Democratic Alliance). The MKP, having increasing internal differences, did not join this alliance.

The internal differences mainly revolved around the question of the peasant movement in NWFP. The three disagreeing factions in the MKP were personified by Sher Ali Bacha, Afzal Bangash, Imtiaz Alam, and Major Ishaq Muhammad.

- Sher Ali Bacha argued that in many areas the tenants had become capitalists, as a result of MKP's success in NWFP, and had in turn developed an antagonistic contradiction with the rural labourers they hired. The party should therefore lead the labourers in their confrontation with the tenants. He called for a direct socialist revolution.
- Afzal Bangash also recognised that new contradictions had erupted, but did not see them as antagonistic. He furthermore criticised the rhetoric of immediate socialist revolution as both infantile and Trotskyite.
- In the Punjab section of the party Imtiaz Alam, along with some younger elements of the party, objected to Major Ishaq's stance on the national question, and an alleged dogmatism of his. He also accused Bangash of dawdling on said questions, and also making an unprincipled alliance with Ishaq.

Finally in 1978, the MKP formally split up into three factions: One led by Bangash, taking most of the NWFP organisation and the party in northern Punjab with him. A second led by Sher Ali Bacha and Imtiaz Alam, taking most of the cadres in Punjab and Karachi and a small number in NWFP (Sher Ali Bacha later separated himself from this faction, forming the Pakhtunkhwa Mazdoor Kisan Party). And finally a third faction led by Major Ishaq Muhammad, which was supported by a small number of the party's old guard in Punjab and a small number of cadres from Karachi (Major Ishaq Muhammad's faction later merged with the Communist Party of Pakistan).

Of these three factions, the one led by Afzal Bangash soon came to be recognised by the public as the MKP.

=== Unity Congress ===
After the split in 1978, Bangash was elected as leader of the MKP and he quickly moved to join AJIP. The coalition provided dialogue and accommodation between the various leftist groups although bitter disagreements were present. Eventually the MKP and the Pakistan Workers’ Party (PWP) led by Fatehyab Ali Khan, decided to merge and reduce their votes in the coalition from two to one. This unification was announced at the second congress of the party, the "unity congress".

The unity congress was held in July 1979 at Mandani in NWFP. In spite of martial law restrictions, almost 5000 delegates participated along with observers from a wide range of parties. It was a historical congress and a huge step for MKP. The merging of the MKP and PWP signified a unification of the party having the largest peasant base with the party having the largest trade union base, making the MKP a true workers’ and peasants’ party. Resolutions and the political program implemented at the congress showed the maturity and realism of the new party, and also illustrated the potential of forging left unity.

The unity congress also elected Afzal Bangash as president of the MKP, Fatehyab Ali Khan as Senior Vice-President and Shaukat Ali as secretary-general. Mirza Mohammad Ibrahim, a veteran labour leader, was elected to the Central Working Committee of the party. Pakistan Mazdoor Kisan Party was formally adopted as the name of the party.

A message of solidarity was also sent by Benazir Bhutto. All in all, the congress was an indication of the end of the political isolation of the MKP and the entry into mainstream politics, while keeping its distinct character.

=== The party's role after Unity Congress ===
The MKP played a fundamental role in the popular struggle against the military regime of General Zia ul-Haq. In early 1981, it had a significant role in forming the united front called Movement for the Restoration of Democracy (MRD). The PNA also attracted other leftist groups, and was merged with the Muttahida Majlis-e-Amal (MMA), Surkh Parcham Mahaz-Punjab Jamhoori Front (PJF) and Muttahida Mazdoor Mahaz in Punjab. Much of the character of the MKP was owed to the contributions of parties and organisations merging with it.

=== Death of Afzal Bangash and decline of MKP ===
In 1985, martial law was lifted. MKP president Afzal Bangash returned to Pakistan in mid-1986. Although the MKP was officially one single party, internally it was divided in two factions at this point:

- One MKP faction consisting of President Afzal Bangash and the original MKP members.
- A second MKP faction consisting of Senior Vice-President Fatehyab Ali Khan and his followers, all of whom used to be part of the PWP.

Soon after his return, Afzal Bangash decided to merge his MKP faction with Abdul Wali Khan's National Democratic Party (NDP) thus creating the new Awami National Party (ANP). However, Fatehyab Ali Khan's faction did not follow the merger with the NDP, instead it continued on as MKP, now calling itself "Mazdoor Kisan Party Pakistan".

In October 1986, Bangash died. The death of Bangash signaled the decline of MKP as a significant political force in Pakistan, and the next few decades were to be tumultuous for the party.

The merger the NDP and MKP into ANP never had much support from members of the Afzal Bangash MKP faction, and so around 1988 they decided to split from ANP and once again reconstitute as MKP.

In 1989, Fatehyab Ali Khan was chosen to become president of all of MKP, both his own "Mazdoor Kisan Party Pakistan" faction and the late Afzal Bangash MKP faction.

In August 2002, MKP issued some statements to express its views on the then upcoming national elections under Pervez Musharraf regime. Dawn (newspaper) reported, "The newly elected president of the Mazdoor Kisan Party, Fatehyab Ali Khan, has said that his party will cooperate with the leftist and progressive parties in the forthcoming general elections." Khan also pledged "that if voted to power, his party will provide free education up to matric for all and restore the 1973 Constitution in its original form."

In 2004, the Afzal Bangash MKP faction decided to once again go its own way. It split with Fatehyab Ali Khan's MKP faction and instead chose Aslam Khan Gigyanay as the new party President. Gigyanay remained President until 2012.

=== Recent events ===
In 2012, a documentary film was screened in Lahore highlighting the armed struggle of peasants and workers of this small area which was crushed in 1974 by the Zulfikar Ali Bhutto regime.

On 27 October 2013, tribute was paid to Afzal Bangash, Salar Mohammad Shah Ali and Inqilabi Gojar Khan at an event in Charsadda for their efforts to help the working class. Some speakers at the event complained about the performance of Imran Khan's Pakistan Tehreek-e-Insaf (PTI) in Khyber Pakhtunkhwa province following the party's coming to power after the 2013 Pakistani general election. One speaker said: "Pakistan Tehreek-i-Insaf came into power in the province through the slogan of 'change', but miserably failed to bring the promised change."

== Political program ==
The following political program was adopted at the unity congress in 1979. Overall the MKP called for the establishment of a "people's democratic" system in Pakistan which would eventually lead to socialism. The class contradiction in its view was fundamental to other political contradictions. The ideal system was defined as one in which power was held by workers, peasants, patriotic sections of the intelligentsia, nationalistic entrepreneurs and small traders. Imperialist domination, comprador capitalism and governance of bureaucracy were to be eliminated.

- State and government: Pakistan should be a federation brought about by the voluntary and equal association of the provinces which should enjoy complete autonomy in their own affairs. It should be a democratic state in which people will exercise power through the revolutionary party and through elected assemblies.
- Economy: The current neo-colonial, dependent capitalist system with vestiges of feudal-type relations should be abolished, imperialist domination of the economy ended and a re-orientation of the economy towards real growth, independent development, self-sufficiency, self-reliance and genuine progress should be employed. The state should take a leading role in economic development including nationalisation of the enterprises owned by comprador and pro-imperialist capitalists and management of socialised industry by representative committees of workers. Excess land taken from big land-owners should be distributed free among the local landless and poor peasants.
- National question: National inequality and oppression should be eliminated. Different nationalities and ethnic groups should be given equal rights and every child should be allowed an education in his/her native tongue.
- Culture: The popular cultural heritage must be protected and promoted. The current imperialist, feudal and doctrinaire cultural influence should be rooted out.
- Fundamental rights: All citizens shall have freedom of religion, freedom of expression and freedom of press, regardless of their race, gender or nationality. Vested interests shall not be allowed to exploit the name of Islam to oppress the masses, obstruct progress or instigate communal hatred.
- Women: No position should be closed to women. They shall have equal rights with men and be allowed to participate in the development and defence of the country.
- Foreign policy: Pakistan shall support the struggles against imperialism, Zionism and racism. Closer relations with the socialist countries should be developed for mutual advantage. Cooperation with other third world countries for establishing a new international economic order. Support for disarmament and world peace.

== Internal structure ==
The MKP was organised according to the principle of democratic centralism. The leadership was collective and political instead of individual and personal. The supreme body was the all-party Congress which was held every four years. It determined the party line and program of action and also elected the central council, which functioned as the highest authority of the party in between congresses. The central council elected the members of the Central Working Committee and the office-bearers of the party.

Below the central council were the provincial branches of the party, which held their own Congresses and elected their own councils. The branches were in turn divided into districts and further into basic organisational units in towns and villages. In parts of the NWFP where the rural membership was very large, several committees got together to form a "Markaz" which carried out a coordinating role.

The members at each level were free to state their opinions on all issues, debate and criticise policies and conduct of leaders at all levels. Still, in the face of this criticism and self-criticism, it was a requirement that members maintained discipline and abided by the decisions of the majority. Also, the election at all levels of higher bodies by the relevant membership meant that although there was a flow of authority from top to bottom, the lower bodies had a great deal of autonomy.

== Mass base ==
The primary mass base of the MKP was the peasantry of NWFP and the organised workers of Punjab. The peasants were mostly directly members of the party while the workers were organised through other organisations affiliated with the MKP. The main worker mass organisation was the All Pakistan Trade Union Federation (APTUF) led by Mirza Ibrahim. Mirza Ibrahim was himself a member of the MKP's Central Working Committee. The APTUF was the largest trade union federation in Pakistan and thus contributed greatly to the MKP.

Although the MKP had always been quite weak among the urban middle class groups it did manage getting a good number of members from amongst lawyers, journalists, college teachers and other white-collar professions.

The MKP had very little support among students although its own student wing, the Sarhad Students’ Federation did merge with the Pushtoon Students Organisation in Baluchistan (An affiliate of the PNAP) thereby forming the Pakhtonkhwa Students Organisation (PSO).

A separate front organisation for women was not created within the MKP. Still, many activists from the Women’s Action Forum were members or sympathisers of the MKP and the APTUF also had a strong women's part.

The MKP had a great focus on political education. It published a large number of books, magazines and pamphlets. Sher Ali Bacha was the main editor of these magazines and pamphlets including the weekly "Sanobar" which was closed down in 1971 and the monthly "Circular" running from 1972 to 1978.

== See also ==
- Communist Mazdoor Kissan Party
