= Sindhi–Baloch–Pashtun Front =

- Flag of the SBPF
- Formation: March 31, 1985; 41 years ago
- Defunct: 1986-1987.
- Key people: Afzal Bangash; Ataullah Mengal; Mumtaz Bhutto

The Sindhi–Baloch–Pashtun Front (SBPF) was formed in London on 31 March 1985 by Afzal Bangash, Ataullah Mengal, Mumtaz Bhutto and others to counter what they perceived as a Punjabi establishment's hegemony of Pakistan. It called for a confederation in Pakistan instead of a federation.

The Front leaders saw the country as being under military oppression, noting that the provinces were united only through the brute force of the Military. The SBPF concluded that the agreement between the constituent units has been broken and Pakistan had been turned into occupied territory. As an alternative to the federal system, the SBPF put forward a confederal proposal premised on a right to secede in the face of unchecked central military powers. General Zia's response towards the confederationists was to warn that "all such persons will have to erase such wayward ideas from their minds and become Pakistanis first," and arresting SBPF leaders for delivering speeches which "vehemently criticized the ideology of Pakistan and promulgated [a] 'Confederal System'."

After the death of Afzal Bangash in October 1986, the Sindhi–Baloch–Pashtun Front slowly withered away.
