= Gentlemen and Players (TV series) =

1980s British television series

- Series 1 title screen
- Genre: Drama
- Created by: Dram Associates
- Written by: Chris Roose; Dennis Abey; Guy Meredith; David Wilks; Edmund Ward
- Starring: Brian Protheroe; Nicholas Clay; Claire Oberman; Edita Brychta; Faith Brook
- Ending theme: "Life's A Game" performed by Petula Clark
- Country of origin: United Kingdom
- Original language: English
- No. of series: 2
- No. of episodes: 13

Production
- Producers: Raymond Menmuir; Graham Benson (exec)
- Running time: 1 hour (including ads)
- Production company: TVS Television

Original release
- Network: ITV
- Release: 10 April 1988 – 9 June 1989

Gentlemen and Players is a British television series produced by TVS Television for the ITV network. An aspirational late 1980s drama series, Gentlemen and Players dealt with the struggles and intrigues involving two business rivals, Bo Beaufort and Mike Savage, set against a backdrop of high finance, opulent country homes and cricket.

== Premise ==
Miles "Bo" Beaufort (Brian Protheroe) is a rich "blue blood" financier who comes from a wealthy upper-class family. Mike Savage (Nicholas Clay) is a self-made businessman from a more modest family background, who likes adventure. The two are old enemies, and when Savage returns from a stay in Africa (fleeing from a coup with a fortune in bonds), he chooses to settle with his wife Sandy (Claire Oberman) and daughters in the affluent Hampshire village of Hunton Magna, in a Georgian mansion that is next door to Beaufort's home. Unhappy about his new neighbour, especially when he joins his local cricket club, Beaufort schemes and uses the old boy network to hamper Savage's plans whenever possible. Rivalry between the two escalates as "old money" clashes with "new money".

== Cast ==
Starring

- Bo Beaufort - Brian Protheroe
- Mike Savage - Nicholas Clay
- Sandy Savage - Claire Oberman
- Jane Somerville - Edita Brychta
- Eleanor Beaufort - Faith Brook

Recurring cast

- Paula Savage - Debra Beaumont
- Kimberley Savage - Claudia Gambold
- Liz Beaufort - Sara Griffiths
- Kate Beaufort - Sadie Frost (Series 1 only)
- Alex Castle - Osmund Bullock
- Tom Fletcher - Leslie Schofield
- Freddie Hall - Robert Ashby (Series 1 only)
- Charles Neville - Terence Harvey
- Sir Geoffrey Hinchcliffe - Nicholas Selby
- PC Perkins - Lewis George
- Jenny - Steffanie Pitt

== Production and broadcast ==
Two series were made between 1988 and 1989, comprising 13 episodes in total, mostly filmed on location in London and Hampshire. The first series, comprising seven episodes, was screened on ITV on Sunday nights at 7.45pm from 10 April - 22 May 1988. The second series, comprising six episodes, moved to Friday nights at 9pm, and ran from 28 April - 9 June 1989.

The press release for the series by TVS Television described Gentlemen and Players as "A story of money, class and rivalry set in the world of finance and gracious country homes.", with The Guardian newspaper describing it as "a kind of Dallas in Hampshire".

== Reception ==
Writing in The Guardian in 1989 (at the end of the second series), critic Nancy Banks-Smith mocked the "yards and yards and yards" of blue and white striped shirt material (a typical garment for 1980s banking and business culture) that many of the characters wear. "Everybody in Gentlemen and Players wore blue striped shirts to show they are something substantial in the city. It is as if the noble blood in their veins were showing through the clear white Caucasian of their skins." Commenting on the casting of the series' array of unscrupulous businessmen, she noted "...Every untrustworthy face in Equity was on parade. Some of whom had eyes that operated independently. One [character] had a deeply unreliable moustache."

== Episode list ==
=== Series 1 (1988) ===
No.	Title	Directed by	Written by	Original release date
1	"Last Man In"	Dennis Abey	Chris Roose & Dennis Abey	10 April 1988
2	"White Knights"	William Brayne	Guy Meredith	17 April 1988
3	"Box Clever"	Dennis Abey	Guy Meredith	24 April 1988
4	"One for Sorrow Two for Joy"	William Brayne	David Wilks	1 May 1988
5	"According to the Rules"	Dennis Abey	Chris Roose	8 May 1988
6	"It's All Who You Know"	William Brayne	Guy Meredith	15 May 1988
7	"Stags at Bay"	William Brayne	Neil Richards, story by Guy Meredith	22 May 1988

=== Series 2 (1989) ===
No.	Title	Directed by	Written by	Original release date
1	"Inside Track"	Stuart Urban	Edmund Ward	28 April 1989
2	"Three Can Play"	Stuart Urban	Edmund Ward	5 May 1989
3	"Hard Hat Zone"	Stuart Urban	Ben Rostul	12 May 1989
4	"Loyalties"	William Brayne	Edmund Ward, story by Robin Estridge	19 May 1989
5	"Black Gold"	William Brayne	Liam McCaw	2 June 1989
6	"Another Square Mile"	William Brayne	Edmund Ward	9 June 1989

== Theme song ==

The theme song played over the end credits, "Life's A Game", was written by David Lindup and performed by Petula Clark. Produced by Tony Britten, who also composed the incidental music for the series, the song was released as a single in 1988 by Fly Records.

== Availability ==
There has been no domestic commercial release of Gentlemen and Players on any format in the UK. This is possibly due to ongoing rights issues after the production company, TVS, dropped out of the ITV network in 1992 and subsequently went through a number of take-overs. This problem affects the majority of the TVS programme archive as much of the original production paperwork and sales documentation has been lost during the intervening years.
