= Shahida (film) =

1949 Pakistani film

- Directed by: Luqman with Anwar Kamal Pasha assisting
- Written by: Hakim Ahmad Shuja
- Produced by: M. Akbar
- Starring: Shamim Bano; Nasir Khan; Shammi; Shakir; Hamaliyawala
- Music by: Ghulam Haider and Ghulam Ahmed Chishti
- Distributed by: Shuaa Noor Films
- Release date: 18 March 1949
- Country: Pakistan
- Language: Urdu

Shahida is a Pakistani Urdu-language Muslim social film released on 19 March 1949. The film was directed by Luqman. The film was actually the first Pakistani film which was filmed before the independence of Pakistan in 1947 and later released in 1949, unlike Teri Yaad which started its production after independence and was released earlier than Shahida.

Shamim Bano played the title role in the film opposite Nasir Khan, who appeared in the leading role in his second and final Lollywood film, after which he left Pakistan and went to India permanently.

This film was originally started as a project by Hakim Ahmad Shuja, along with financial backers in British India (circa 1945-46) but could not be filmed due to various problems, in particular the partition in 1947, which also led to the end of the old, joint film industry and its mutual contacts. The project was revived in 1948, by M. Akbar, as producer and Luqman as director. Hakim Ahmad Shuja was asked to revise his original script and to help write out the song lyrics, of classics such as "Dar Ba Dar Phirte Hain" and "Alwidah", with Ghulam Haider and Ghulam Ahmed Chishti giving the music.

== Plot ==
In the aftermath of the 1947 Partition, a girl suffers disruption of a family life later migrates, and the adjustment to a newly formed country. Shahida yearns to see her lover Saeed and wants marry to him the separation from him causes her to drove into depression.

== Cast ==
- Shamim Bano as Shahida
- Nasir Khan as Saeed
- Shakir as Kabeer
- G. N. Butt as Ameer Hassan
- Baby Shamshad (Shammi)
- Hamaliyawala (Note: his real name was Mohammad Afzal)
- Begum Parveen
- Nafees Hassan
- Rani Mumtaz
- Khalil Aftab

== Production ==
=== Background ===
The pre-production of the film began in 1946 as Shafaq with Hammed Khan as a producer and director, however the production came to a halt due to his death. The story writer of the film, Hakim Ahmad Shuja, revived the film in 1948 with Luqman was selected as the director and M. Akbar as the producer. Luqman chose Farida Khanum and Nasir Khan as the leads, however eventually replaced Khanum with Shamim Bano. The production faced challenges due to the tension arising from the Partition of India, including studio sabotage and issues with the film negative, which was subsequently imported directly from London. The film was eventually completed and released in 1949.

== Release and box office ==
Shahida received "average reviews" in Pakistan. In India the film ran for 25 consecutive weeks in the Indian cities of Delhi and Lucknow, a commercial metric known as a "silver jubilee" in South Asian cinema. It achieved a silver jubilee status.

=== Music ===
The music was composed by a pair of acclaimed musical directors Ghulam Haider and Ghulam Ahmed Chishti. The lyrics were written by Hakim Ahmad Shuja. The soundtrack is particularly notable as it was one of the first musical scores produced for the fledgling Pakistani film industry after the 1947 partition. Ghulam Haider was one of the many creative professionals who migrated to Pakistan after partition. His work on Shahida was one of his early contributions to the country's new film industry. Ghulam Ahmed Chishti was a prolific composer in the early Pakistani film industry, he was known for composing music for several films in 1949, including Shahida. Playback singers included Munawar Sultana, Ali Bakhsh Zahoor and Abdul Shakoor Bedal.

== Soundtrack ==
While the music direction was provided separately by Ghulam Haider and Ghulam Ahmad Chishti, the Urdu lyrics were written by Hakim Ahmad Shuja and the songs were sung by Munawar Sultana, Ali Baksh Zahoor and Abdul Shakoor Bedal.

Song	Singer(s)	Music Director
"Kabhi Tum Khwab Mein Hi Surat Dikha Jaate To Kya Hota..."	Abdul Shakoor Bedal	Ghulam Haider
"Al-Widaa, Al-Widaa, Pyaray Watan Al-Widaa..."	Munawar Sultana	Ghulam Haider
"Dar-Ba-Dar Phirte Hain Hum Ko Poochta Koi Nahin..."	Munawar Sultana	Ghulam Haider
"Duniya Se Jo Mita Hai Woh Hamara Nishan Ho..."	Munawar Sultana	Ghulam Haider
"Kab Tak Na Suni Jaayegu Fariyaad Hamaari..."	Munawar Sultana	Ghulam Haider
"Yeh Kambakht Do Dil Bhi Milne Na Paye..."	Munawar Sultana	Ghulam Haider
"Yeh Bhi Koi Insaaf Hai Ae Sahib-e-Insaaf, Wahan Mitti Ke Pyaale Mein..."	Munawar Sultana	Ghulam Ahmed Chishti
"Parde Parde Mein Is Zaalim Ne Ruswa Kar Diya..."	Munawar Sultana and Ali Bakhsh Zahoor	Ghulam Ahmed Chishti

== Legacy ==
The film is considered the first Pakistani film that was started before the country's independence in 1947 but released afterward. The project was first conceived in British India around 1945–46 but was delayed and interrupted by the 1947 partition. Shahida's eventual release in 1949, after production was revived in 1948, symbolized the determination of filmmakers to rebuild and establish a new national cinema from the ground up.

=== Historical significance for Pakistani cinema ===
The music of Shahida is significant as it represents a transitional period in South Asian cinema. While the film was originally conceived in pre-partition British India, the musical score is an early example of Pakistani film music. The soundtrack helped establish a foundation for the musical style that would evolve within the country's film industry in the decades that followed.
