= Riffat Hassan =

Pakistani-American theologian

Riffat Hassan (born 1943) is a Pakistani-American theologian and a leading Islamic feminist scholar of the Qur'an.

== Early life and career ==
Hassan was born in Lahore, Pakistan, to a Sayid Muslim family. Hassan's maternal grandfather was Hakim Ahmad Shuja, a Pakistani poet, writer and playwright. She lived a comfortable childhood, but was affected by the conflict between her father's traditional views and her mother's nonconformism. For most of her life, she hated her father's traditionalism because of his views of sex roles, but she later came to appreciate it because of his kindness and compassion. She attended Cathedral High School, an Anglican missionary school, and later St. Mary's College at Durham University, England, where she studied English and philosophy. She received her Ph.D. from Durham University in 1968 for her thesis on Muhammad Iqbal, who she has written about frequently.

She taught at the University of Punjab at Lahore from 1966 to 1967 and worked in Pakistan's Ministry of Information and Broadcasting from 1969 to 1972. In 1972, she immigrated to the United States with her daughter. She has taught at schools including Oklahoma State University and Harvard University, and is currently a professor of Religious Studies at the University of Louisville, Kentucky.

== Theology and activism ==
Hassan's theology is an example of Progressive Islam. She says the Qur'an is the "Magna Carta of human rights", prescribing human rights and equality for all, while the inequality of women in many Muslim societies today is due to cultural effects. Hassan claims the Qur'an upholds rights to life, respect, justice, freedom, knowledge, sustenance, work, and privacy, among others.

She supports a non-rigid interpretation of the Qur'an, arguing that while it is the word of God, words can have different meanings, so there are theoretically countless possible meanings of the Qur'an. She believes the meaning of the Qur'an should be determined through hermeneutics — examination of what its words meant at the time it was written. She also speaks of an "ethical criterion" that rejects the use of the Qu'ran to perpetrate injustice, because the God of Islam is just.

Hassan supports abortion rights and access to contraceptives for Muslim women, saying that the Qur'an does not directly address contraceptives, but that Islam's religious and ethical framework leads to the conclusion that family planning should be a fundamental right. She says a review of Muslim jurisprudence indicates that abortion has been considered acceptable within the first 120 days of pregnancy, when the fetus has not yet been ensouled.

In February 1999, she founded The International Network for the Rights of Female Victims of Violence in Pakistan, which works against so-called honor killings. She has argued that honor killings are a distortion of Islam, and further, that the whole idea that women are inferior is a result of the mistaken belief among Muslims that Eve was created from Adam's rib, when, in the Islamic creation story, they were created at the same time.

Hassan is not only a scholar, she is also an activist. In her capacity as an activist, Hassan developed and directed "Islamic Life in the U.S." (2002–2006) and "Religion and Society: A Dialogue" (2006–2009), two peace-building programs which created a standard for interfaith discussion and peace-building, following the 2001 attacks.

She also wrote the eleventh chapter of Transforming the Faiths of our Fathers: Women who Changed American Religion (2004), edited by Ann Braude.

== Publications ==
Hassan's career includes numerous publications, in which she applies her non-patriarchal interpretation of Islam.

One of Hassan's publications is her article on Women’s Rights in Islam: Normative Teachings Versus Practice in which she discusses the rights she has identified for women as instructed by the Qur’an and how Muslim practices either support or do not support these rights. In this article, she also pays special attention to the relationship between the West and Islam due to the sometimes tense relationship between them. This article identifies the specific rights given to all humankind, some of which include the right to respect, to justice, to acquire knowledge, and to "the Good Life." She then draws out the specific issues Muslim women face in practice including marital problems and divorce, polygamy, and segregations and veiling. Taking these specifics, she addresses a case study on Pakistan. She concludes that "although violations of women’s rights are widespread in the Muslim world… the Qur’an does not discriminate against women" (57). She ends the article with a push towards the growth of "an educated group of persons who understand Islam to be a religion of justice and compassion" (62). Hassan uses her knowledge of the Quran, women's rights and issues, and Pakistan to call for a closer reading of the Quran to serve as the backbone of all practices.

=== Recent Articles ===
- "Woman and Man's 'Fall': A Qur'anic Theological Perspective" (2013), Muslima Theology: The Voices of Muslim Women Theologians
- "Human Liberation is Supported by the Holy Qur'an" (2007) Women in Religion
- "Islamic Hagar and Her Family" (2006) Hagar, Sarah and Their Children
- "Marriage: Islamic Discourses" (2005) Encyclopedia of Women and Islamic Cultures
- "Women's Rights in Islam: Normative Teachings vs Practice" (2005) Islam and Human Rights: Advancing a U.S. - Muslim Dialogue
- "Riffat Hassan: Muslim Feminist Theologian" (2004) Transforming the Faith of Our Fathers: Women Who Changed American Religion
- "Rights of Women: Muslim Practice versus Normative Islam" (2003) Women's Rights and Islam
- "Islam" (2003) Her Voice, Her Faith: Women Speak on World Religions
- "Muslim Women's Rights A Contemporary Debate" (2002) Women for Afghan Women: Shattering Myths and Claiming the Future
- "Islam and Human Rights in Pakistan" (2002) Canadian Foreign Policy
- "Is Islam a Help or Hindrance to Women's Development?" (2002) Islam in the Era of Globalization
- "Equal for Allah, Unequal on Earth? Women's Rights in the Modern World" (2001) The Report of the International Conference on Muslim Women and Development
- "Challenging the Stereotypes of Fundamentalism: An Islamic Feminist Perspective" (2001) The Muslim World
- "Is Family Planning Permitted by Islam: The Issue of a Woman's Right to Contraception?" (2000) Windows of Faith
- "Muslim Women's Empowerment" (1999) Time-Utopia-Eschatology
- "Feminism in Islam" (1999) Feminism and World Religions
- "Conservatism in its Various Forms" (1998) Women in Religion
- "Muslim Women's Empowerment and Self-Actualization" (1997) Religious Consultation Report
- "Women in Islam: Contemporary Challenges" (1997) Zivilcourage: Frauensache?
- "Feministische Interpretationen des Islams" (1997) Feminismus, Islam, Nation

== See also ==
- Hakim Ahmad Shuja
- Yawar Hayat Khan
