= Nirali Duniya =

- Starring: Shamim Bano; Eddie Billimoria; Lalita Pawar
- Release date: 1940
- Country: India
- Language: Hindi

Nirali Duniya is a Bollywood film. It was released in 1940.
