= Shamim Bano =

Pakistan actress

- شمیم بانو
- Born: Shamim Bano Begum; 29 July 1920; Lahore, British India
- Died: 23 October 1984 (aged 64); Lahore, Punjab, Pakistan
- Other names: Shamim; Bano Begum
- Occupations: Actress; Singer
- Years active: 1939–1977
- Spouse: Anwar Kamal Pasha (husband)
- Children: 3
- Relatives: Hakim Ahmad Shuja (father-in-law)
- Awards: Nigar Award: Best Supporting Actress Award for Zehr-e-Ishq (1958) and Ghalib (1961)

Shamim Bano (also commonly termed 'Shamim' or 'Bano Begum'; 29 July 1920 – 23 October 1984) was a Pakistani actress and singer active in Indian and Pakistani cinema. She starred alongside Dilip Kumar in his debut film Jwar Bhata. (Note: Not to be confused with another, later Pakistani film actress Shamim Ara) She was the wife of prominent Pakistani film director and producer Anwar Kamal Pasha, and thus daughter-in-law of the poet, writer and scholar Hakim Ahmad Shuja.

== Early life ==
Shamim Bano was born in Lahore, British India, in 1920 to a family of Pathan farmers and small landowners. Later they settled in the Punjab region but her parents sold most of their landholding and shifted to Lahore and later Bombay (now Mumbai), soon after the end of the First World War.

== Career ==
Shamim was a successful Indian heroine of the 1940s. She was related to legendary actress and singer Khursheed Bano as well as Meena Kumari. She is remembered for her role as the co-star of Dilip Kumar in his first film Jwar Bhata (1944).

She started her career in the late 1930s with Vishnu Cine's Baghi (1939). Ranjit Movietone's Armaan (1942) was one of the most popular films of her career. Another milestone of her career was Kishore Sahu's Sindoor (1947), which became quite controversial at the time of its release because it dealt with the topic of remarriage of Hindu widows. Mehmaan, Sanyasi and Pehle Aap were other notable films of her career.

After India's partition in 1947, she migrated to Pakistan and appeared in a few Pakistani films, including Shahida (1949) where she was paired with Dilip Kumar's younger brother Nasir Khan, followed by Do Ansoo (1950) which became the first golden jubilee Urdu film of Pakistan.

== Personal life ==
Bano married director and producer Anwar Kamal Pasha with whom she had worked in the movie Do Ansoo. Pasha was younger than her. She bid adieu to her film career to focus on her family. She had three children with Pasha.

== Death ==
She died at her home in Lahore in 1984.

== Filmography ==
=== Film ===
Year	Film	Language
1939	Imandar	Hindi
1939	Baghi	Hindi
1940	Kanyadan	Hindi
1940	Nirali Duniya	Hindi
1940	Pyar	Hindi
1941	Dhandora	Hindi
1941	Pyas	Hindi
1942	Armaan	Hindi
1942	Fariyaad	Hindi
1942	Maheman	Hindi
1942	Return of Toofan Mail	Hindi
1943	Bansari	Hindi
1943	Gauri	Hindi
1944	Pehle Aap	Hindi
1944	Jwar Bhata	Hindi
1945	Sanyasi	Hindi
1946	Laaj	Hindi
1947	Bhanwar	Hindi
1947	Sindoor	Hindi
1947	Do Naina	Hindi
1947	Nateeja	Hindi
1947	Samrat Ashok	Hindi
1947	Shikarpuri	Hindi
1948	Azad Hindustani	Hindi
1948	Desh Seva	Hindi
1948	Toote Tare	Hindi
1949	Shahida	Urdu
1950	Do Ansoo	Urdu
1950	Gabhroo	Punjabi
1951	Dilbar	Punjabi
1953	Ghulam	Urdu
1953	Tarrap	Urdu
1954	Raat Ki Baat	Urdu
1958	Zehr-e-Ishq	Urdu
1961	Ghalib	Urdu
1976	Sajjo Rani	Hindi

== Awards and recognition ==
Year	Award	Category	Result	Title	Ref.
1958	Nigar Award	Best Supporting Actress	Won	Zehr-e-Ishq	
1961	Nigar Award	Best Supporting Actress	Won	Ghalib	
