= C'est La Vie (TV series) =

Mauritian TV Series

- Genre: Drama
- Created by: Romesh Sharma
- Directed by: Romesh Sharma
- Country of origin: Mauritius
- Original language: Mauritian Creole

Production
- Running time: 20 minutes

Original release
- Network: Mauritius Broadcasting Corporation
- Release: 2003

C'est La Vie is a Mauritian TV Series directed and produced by Romesh Sharma. This TV series enjoyed by a lot of Mauritians was later converted into a full-fledged movie called Dil Jo Bhi Kahey.

== Cast ==
=== Main ===
- Karan Sharma as Jay
