= Sajjo Rani =

- Directed by: Govind Saraiya
- Starring: Ramesh Deo; Romesh Sharma; Rehana Sultan; Urmila Bhatt; Seema Deo; Shamim Bano; Satyen Kappu; Sajjan; Jayshree T.
- Release date: 1976
- Country: India
- Language: Hindi

Sajjo Rani is a 1976 Bollywood film directed by Govind Saraiya.

== Cast ==
- Ramesh Deo
- Romesh Sharma
- Rehana Sultan
- Urmila Bhatt
- Satyen Kappu
- Shamim Bano
- Seema Deo
- Sumati Gupte
- Jayshree T.
- Shekhar Purohit
- Sajjan
- Amrit Patel

== Soundtrack ==
1. "Saiyyan Ke Gaon Mein Taaro Ki Chhaav Mein" – Asha Bhosle
2. "Jiya Mane Nahi Khadi Taako Saiyya" – Asha Bhosle
3. "Mori Bali Umariya Kharab Kini Balma" – Asha Bhosle
4. "Paao Mein Payal" – Asha Bhosle
5. "Saanson Mein Chandan Sa, Aankho MeinKajal Sa" – Aarti Mukherjee
6. "Nathaniya Ne Hai Ram" – Shobha Gurtu
7. "Dil Hai Haazir Lijiye" (version 1) – Shobha Gurtu
8. ""Dil Hai Haazir Lijiye" (version 2) – Shobha Gurtu
