= Sindoor (1947 film) =

- Screen shot from Sindoor
- Directed by: Kishore Sahu
- Produced by: Sasadhar Mukherjee Productions
- Starring: Kishore Sahu; Shamim Bano; Paro Devi; Sushil Sahu
- Music by: Khemchand Prakash
- Production company: Filmistan
- Release date: 1947
- Country: India
- Language: Hindi

Sindoor is a 1947 Hindi social film directed by Kishore Sahu. The film was produced Sasadhar Mukherjee Productions for Filmistan and had the actor Mehmood in one of his early films. The story, dialogues and part of the lyrics were written by Kishore Sahu. One of the lyricists was Qamar Jalalabadi, with music composed by Khemchand Prakash. The film starred Kishore Sahu, who played the hero, with Shamim Bano, Paro Devi, Gulab, Mehmood, Pratima Devi, Sushil Sahu and Moni Chatterjee.

The film revolves around the social issue of widow remarriage and was cited as being of "social relevance". The theme of widow remarriage was considered "controversial" in the 1940s, with the film stated to be bold in showing the hero accepting the widow at the end of the film. The climax scene, according to a report in the Illustrated Weekly of India is "remembered" even now, with Sahu being cited as a "socially conscious film-maker".

== Plot ==
Pandit Shivprasad Tiwari, a wealthy contractor, lives in a big house in Lucknow. His family consists of his mother Daadi Maa, his second wife called Maaji by everyone, and his two sons Beni (Kishor Sahu) and Ratan (Sushil Sahu). He also has a daughter who is married. Ratan is the son from the second wife and half-brother to Beni. He has been spoilt by Maaji, who has always treated Beni different to Ratan. Beni grows up to be kind and considerate to the needy. Meera (Shamim), a young widow with a small boy, lives with her mother, known as Maasi, who is distantly related to the Tiwari family. Maasi brings Meera to live with the Tiwari family. Soon, a relationship develops between Meera and Beni, which causes extreme alarm in the family and society. The shocking notion that the relationship may lead to a widow remarrying, is handled sensibly by the patriarch of the family, who gives consent for the two to marry.

== Cast ==
- Kishore Sahu
- Shamim Bano
- Paro Devi
- Sushil Sahu
- Gulab
- Rajendra
- Mehmood
- Pratima Devi

== Soundtrack ==
One of the popular songs from the film was the bhajan "O Roothe Huye Bhagwan" sung by Amirbai Karnataki, with lyrics by Qamar Jalalabadi. The other lyricists were Kishore Sahu, Qamar Jalalabadi, Ambikesh Kuntal, Neelkanth Tiwari and Moti. The singers were Amirbai Karnataki, Sushil Sahu, Paro Devi, S. L. Puri and Naseem Akhtar.

=== Song list ===
#	Title	Singer	Lyricist
1	"O Roothe Huye Bhagwan"	Amirbai Karnataki	Qamar Jalalabadi
2	"O Duniya Banane Wale Kya Yehi Duniya Teri"	Amirbai Karnataki	Qamar Jalalabadi
3	"Kisi Ke Madhur Pyar Mein"	Sushil Sahu, Naseem Akhtar	Neelkanth Tiwari
4	"Silwa De Re Saajanwa Mohe Reshmi Salwar"	Sushil Sahu, Naseem Akhtar	Ambikesh Kuntal
5	"O More Saiyya Padun Mai Tore Paiyya"	S. L. Puri, Paro Devi	Kishore Sahu, Moti
6	"Basant Ritu Aayi Rama Joban Ubhar Ke"	Sushil Kumar	Neelkanth Tiwari
7	"Koi Roke Use Aur Ye Kah De"	Amirbai Karnataki	Qamar Jalalabadi
8	"Mere Naina Hue Bawle Kisi Ke Liya"		Kishore Sahu
