= Diljalaa =

- Directed by: Bapu
- Written by: Vinay Shukla
- Produced by: Romesh Sharma
- Starring: Jackie Shroff; Farah
- Music by: Bappi Lahiri
- Release date: 7 August 1987
- Running time: 142 minutes
- Country: India
- Language: Hindi

Diljalaa is a 1987 Indian Hindi-language crime drama film, starring Jackie Shroff, Farah in lead roles. It was written by Vinay Shukla and directed by director Bapu. The music was composed by Bappi Lahiri. The film was produced by Romesh Sharma.

== Plot ==
Widowed, multi-millionaire Sharda lives with her only son, Munna. She is also the proprietor of a factory called "Sharda Chemicals". Munna is in love with Mamta, the only daughter of Gupta, the general manager of "Sharda Chemicals". Sharda arranges Munna's marriage with Mamta, who is currently pursuing studies at Lovedale College in Manori. On the day of the engagement, Mamta insults her father, Munna and Sharda in the presence of a huge gathering. Thus the marriage plans get cancelled. Then several children get killed after receiving a poisonous vaccine manufactured and marketed by "Sharda Chemicals", prompting the police to arrest Sharda, who is convicted of the crime in court. Sharda becomes senseless in court and died in hospital. Eventually, Munna is killed by Gupta, along with his friends; Mittal, Mehra, Radhe, Shyam, who take over his family's assets, thus renaming the factory, "Friends Chemicals". Gupta then arranges to get Mamta married to Azaad Modi, the only son of wealthy Mrs. Modi, but before the marriage, Mamta gets pregnant by a male in disguise of Azaad, prompting Mrs. Modi to cancel the wedding plans, while on the other hand, Gupta began to face many challenges in business due to a man, who calls himself as Inspector Panchmarg Koda. Relatively unknown to Gupta and his friends that Inspector Panchmarg Koda and the male, who disguises Azaad, is none other than Munna himself, who survives and is out to destroy them one after the other.

== Cast ==
- Jackie Shroff as Munna / Inspector Panchmarg Koda / Azaad Modi
- Farah as Mamta
- Tanuja as Sharda
- Danny Denzongpa as Mr. Gupta
- Narendranath as Mr. Mehra
- Rajesh Puri as Mr. Mittal
- Gurbachan Singh as Radhe
- Sudhir Pandey as Shyam
- Romesh Sharma as Madan Pancholi
- Annu Kapoor as Baba
- Sushma Seth as Mrs. Modi
- Satish Shah as Azaad Modi

== Soundtrack ==
Kavi Pradeep wrote only two versions of "Mere Munna, Mere Chanda", the rest of the songs were written by Indeevar.

Song	Singer
"Mere Munna, Mere Chanda" (male)	Kishore Kumar
"Mere Munna, Mere Chanda" (female)	Lata Mangeshkar
"Jaan Tan Se, Tan Jaan Se"	Kishore Kumar
"Pyar Ki Jab Koi Baat Chali"	Kishore Kumar, Asha Bhosle
"Jaan Tan Se, Tan Jaan Se"	Asha Bhosle
"Khushiyan Ho Teri Humdum"	Asha Bhosle
