= Afzal Bangash =

Pakistani Marxist politician (1924–1986)

Mohammad Afzal Khan Bangash
- محمد افضل خان بنگش محمد افضل خان بنګش
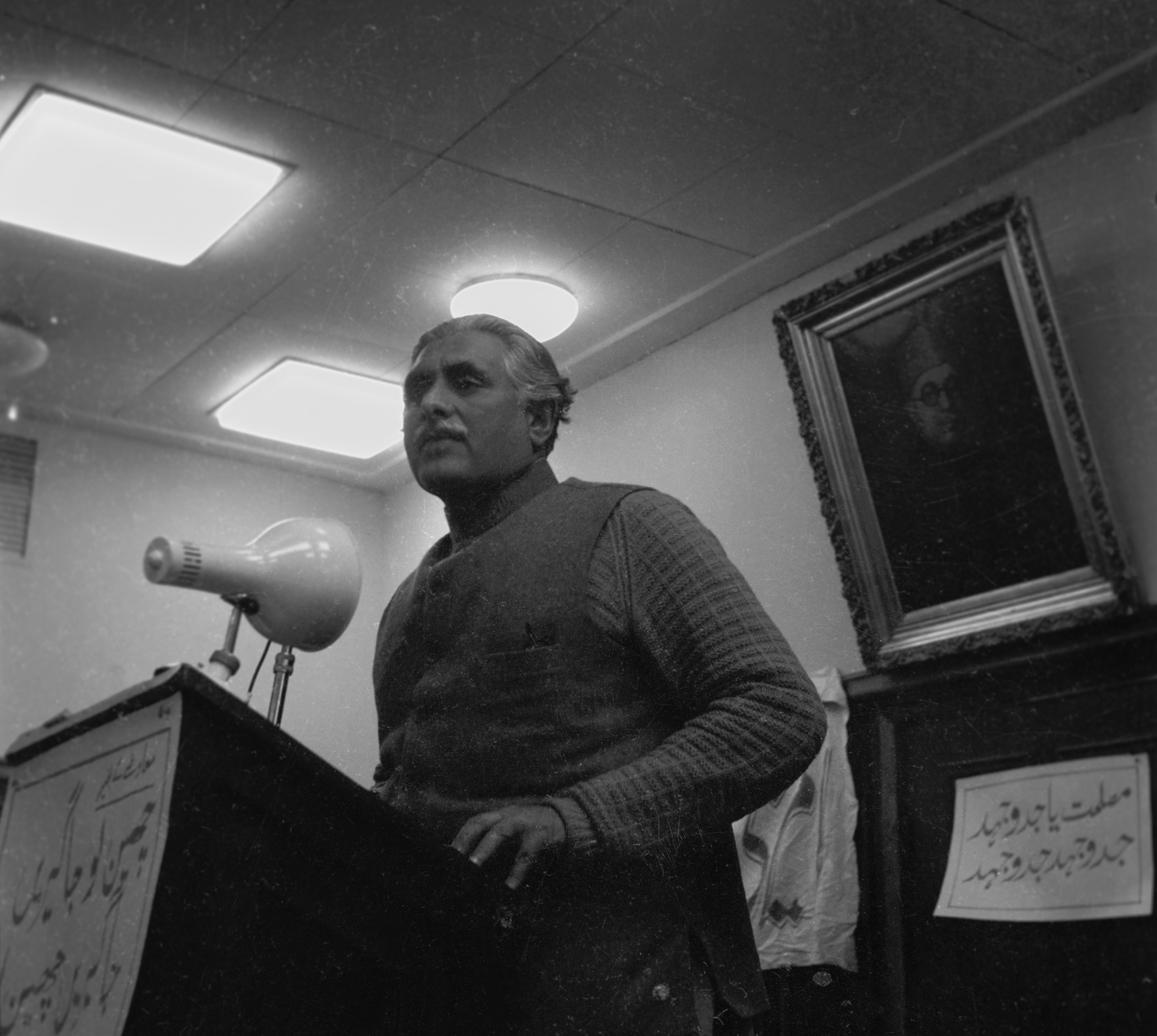
- Afzal Bangash in 1972

Personal details
- Born: 16 April 1924 Kohat, North-West Frontier Province, British India (present-day Khyber Pakhtunkhwa, Pakistan)
- Died: 28 October 1986 (aged 62) Peshawar, North-West Frontier Province, Pakistan (present-day Khyber Pakhtunkhwa, Pakistan)
- Party: Mazdoor Kisan Party
- Other political affiliations: National Awami Party (1957—1968); Communist Party of Pakistan (1948—1957)
- Spouse: Khalida Bangash
- Children: Najmussahar Bangash, Mohammad Aimal Khan Bangash, Mohammad Kamil Khan Bangash, Annie Bangash, Mohammad Ajmal Khan Bangash, Palwasha Bangash
- Occupation: Attorney and political activist

Mohammad Afzal Khan Bangash (Urdu: محمد افضل خان بنگش; 16 April 1924 – 28 October 1986) was a Pakistani Marxist politician and activist. He was a member of the Communist Party of Pakistan (CPP) until 1957 and then served as an office-bearer in the National Awami Party (NAP), and later, along with his colleague Sher Ali Bacha, as the co-founder and president of the Mazdoor Kisan Party (MKP).

== Early life and career ==
Mohammad Afzal Khan Bangash was born on 16 April 1924, in Kohat, British India. His father was Mohammad Akbar Khan Bangash, an advocate.

Afzal Bangash became one of the leading lawyers of NWFP and during Ayub Khan's rule, he was offered the judgeship of the West Pakistan high court. He declined the offer, choosing instead to concentrate on pleading cases of peasants who were being evicted by Ayub's land reforms.

== Political life ==
Bangash joined the Communist Party of Pakistan (CPP) soon after its formation in 1948 and became a member of its NWFP committee.

In 1957 he was elected as the first General Secretary of the National Awami Party (NAP). He was responsible for organizing the peasant committee in NWFP.

In the 1965 Pakistani presidential election, Bangash served as Fatima Jinnah's provincial chief campaign manager in her campaign against Ayub Khan.

In the 1967 NAP split, Afzal Bangash and Sher Ali Bacha, who were active in peasant committees, decided to follow the Khan Abdul Wali Khan faction. However, the NAP leadership soon decided to bar Bangash and Bacha from simultaneously working in peasant committees while being members of the NAP. As a result, they decided to leave the NAP and found the Mazdoor Kisan Party (MKP) on 1 May 1968. The MKP was to become the largest and most militant party with a Marxist orientation in the history of Pakistan. Although Bangash was recognized as principal leader of the MKP, he did not hold any official position until July 1979 when he was elected its president at the party's second congress.

As a trade union organiser, Bangash was founder-president of the Sarhad Trade Union Federation. He also edited the weekly MKP magazine Sanober.

The present leader of the Mazdoor Kissan Party, Afzal Shah Khamosh, mentions in his book that Afzal Bangash split the Mazdoor Kissan Party; therefore, the peasantry started fighting with themselves rather than with feudal lords. What was the possible motive of Bangash that was not explicitly given?

=== Travel abroad ===
On 16 October 1979, Muhammad Zia-ul-Haq declared martial law and intensified political repression. A number of serious charges were drawn up with which to frame Bangash in military courts, however they remained internal and were never made public.

Afzal Bangash had numerous health problems, including chronic bronchitis, asthma, kidney failure, stroke, near blindness, diabetes, heart disease and hypertension. These health issues prompted him to travel abroad to the United Kingdom in 1979, to receive treatment. While staying in the UK he decided against returning to Pakistan for the time being, due to the situation in Pakistan. Instead, he remained active abroad in mobilizing opposition to the military rule of Zia-ul-Haq. During these years he also traveled extensively throughout western Europe, and made trips to the Soviet Union, Czechoslovakia, Poland, the United States, Cuba, India and Mongolia.

He also traveled to Afghanistan. After the Saur Revolution in 1978, Hafizullah Amin had come to power and during Bangash's visit to Afghanistan they spoke together. Amin wanted Bangash to turn the MKP into a Pakistani party allied with his Khalq faction thereby extending the revolution into Pakistan. However, Bangash refused this and instead admonished Amin advising him to take local culture and norms into consideration.

In 1981 the MKP helped found the Movement for the Restoration of Democracy (MRD), and Bangash worked with Benazir Bhutto during that era.

On 31 March 1985, in London and together with Ataullah Mengal, Mumtaz Bhutto and others, he formed the Sindhi–Baloch–Pashtun Front (SBPF) demanding a confederal structure for Pakistan to guarantee the rights of smaller nationalities and counter what they perceived as a Punjabi establishment's hegemony of Pakistan.

=== Return to Pakistan ===
After the lifting of martial law and induction of a civilian government in 1985, political activity was revived in Pakistan and in mid-1986 Afzal Bangash returned to his home country. He resided at his house at Kohat Road in Peshawar and remained involved with merging leftist parties including supporting the fateful decision to merge the MKP with Khan Abdul Wali Khan's National Democratic Party (NDP) thus creating the new Awami National Party (ANP) and ending a nearly two decade-long dispute with Wali Khan. Other parties included in this merger were a faction of the PNP and Rasool Paleejo's Awami Tehrik. Wali Khan became the first president of the ANP while MKP's Sardar Shaukat Ali was elected as its General Secretary.

== Death ==
Bangash died of kidney failure on 28 October 1986, in Peshawar, Pakistan. Nearly one hundred thousand people turned up at his funeral and several hundred thousand mourned in villages and towns both inside and outside NWFP. The present chief minister, governor as well as several provincial ministers and members of the assembly came to pay their respects.

He was originally buried in his ancestral graveyard in Shadi Khel village, Kohat, but later on his remains were transferred to Hashtnagar. Recently, his remains have been transferred back to Shadi Khel in Kohat, in accordance with the burial wishes of Bangash.

== Political views ==
Although Afzal Bangash had a good grasp of the fundamentals of revolutionary theory and Marxist method of analysis, he never pretended to be a theoretician. He detested the idea of revolutionary theory without practice, and laid great emphasis on revolutionary militant action. Apart from writing articles in Sanober, he also translated an Urdu book on historical materialism into Pashto.

Bangash did not consider himself a Maoist, and was opposed to the Chinese invasion of Vietnam, in contrast to many of his colleagues who endorsed it. He did not believe in importing or exporting revolutions, but instead believed in indigenous struggle, with mass mobilization of oppressed people through an astute leadership. In an agrarian society the vanguard of such a struggle would be the peasantry.
