= Karan Sharma (actor) =

Indo-Mauritian actor (born 1981)

- Born: 26 October 1981 (age 44); Port Louis, Mauritius
- Occupation: Actor
- Spouses: Aliksha Anand (divorced): Indu Kumar Sharma
- Father: Romesh Sharma
- Relatives: Mukul S. Anand (father-in-law); Ayaan Ali Khan (brother-in-law)

Karan Romesh Sharma (born 26 October 1981) is an Indo-Mauritian actor. His first and only film to date was released in 2005, Dil Jo Bhi Kahey... starring opposite Amitabh Bachchan which was directed and co-produced by his father Romesh Sharma. In 2003, he did a Mauritian series C'est la vie, which was telecast in Mauritius.

== Personal life ==
He is the son of Indian film producer Romesh Sharma. He was married to Aliksha Anand, the daughter of Indian film director Mukul S. Anand. He is currently married to Indu Kumar Sharma, the daughter of Rakesh Sharma, director of films such as Mr. Natwarlal, Do Aur Do Paanch, Khoon Pasina and Yaarana among others. His sister Neema Sharma is married to Amjad Ali Khan's son Ayaan Ali Khan.

== Filmography ==
- 1987 - Diljalaa
- 2003 - C'est La Vie (Mauritian TV Series)
- 2005 - Dil Jo Bhi Kahey... as Jai Sinha (Film)
