= Sher Ali Bacha =

Pakistani politician

- شېرعلي باچا

Personal details
- Born: 1935 Hoti, Mardan, North-West Frontier Province, British India (present-day Khyber Pakhtunkhwa, Pakistan)
- Died: 25 July 1998 (aged 62–63) Peshawar, North-West Frontier Province, Pakistan (present-day Khyber Pakhtunkhwa, Pakistan)
- Cause of death: Guillain–Barré syndrome
- Resting place: Mardan, Khyber Pakhtunkhwa, Pakistan
- Party: Mazdoor Kisan Party; Pashtunkhwa Milli Awami Party
- Parent: Said Akbar Shah (father)
- Relatives: Hannan Bacha (uncle)
- Education: University of Karachi

Sher Ali Bacha (Pashto: شېرعلي باچا), commonly known as Bachajee (باچاجي), was a Pakistani communist politician, Pashto language poet and human rights activist. He was one of the founding members of the Mazdoor Kisan Party (MKP) and the Pashtunkhwa Milli Awami Party (PMAP).

== Early life and education ==
Bacha's mother, who used to teach him Pashto literature and its historical background, was a major inspiration for him at home. His uncle, Hannan Bacha, was an independence activist against the British colonial rule and was a leader of the Khudai Khidmatgar movement in Mardan. Sher Ali became active in literary activities at young age, and served as the secretary of Pax̌tō Adabī Ṭōləna (پښتو ادبي ټولنه) during his study at Mardan College. Then he started to work for the government, but soon left his government job in Mardan and traveled to Karachi, where he completed his law degree at the University of Karachi.

== Political career ==
Bacha got his start in politics as a Marxist inspired by Marxism–Leninism, and a strong proponent of Pashtun nationalism. He joined the National Awami Party (NAP) in 1963. Bacha and his colleague, Afzal Bangash, were assigned by the party to work for the rights of laborers and peasants and spread awareness among them. However, after opening Kisan Daftar, they were ousted from NAP in 1967 due to misgivings from fellow party members. Kisan Daftar was a group dedicated to the defense of peasants. They went to the party's chairman, Abdul Wali Khan, and asked him to reverse his decision, but he refused. In 1968, Bacha and Bangash again joined hands to found the Mazdoor Kisan Party (MKP) to struggle for the uplift of the oppressed. Bacha renamed his party in 1979 to the Pakhtunkhwa Mazdoor Kisan Party (PMKP).

In 1978, he was an active supporter of the pro-Soviet Saur Revolution in Afghanistan, and showed solidarity with the revolutionary setup of the People's Democratic Party of Afghanistan.

His Pakhtunkhwa Mazdoor Kisan Party and the Pashtunkhwa National Awami Party of Mahmood Khan Achakzai reached an agreement in 1986. As a result of this settlement, the Pashtunkhwa Milli Awami Party (PMAP) was created in March 1989 at a meeting in Quetta. Bacha was elected as the first General Secretary of PMAP, while Achakzai was the chairman. Bacha served as the General Secretary of PMAP until his death on 25 July 1998.

Bacha was arrested and exiled several times in his life. For his pro-democracy activities, he was imprisoned by the Pakistani Martial Law Administrator General Zia-ul-Haq and held in a torture cell in Peshawar's Bala-Hissar Fort.

== Published works ==
Bacha was a well-known author with a strong grasp of literature and history. One of his literary works, Bal Mashālūna ("Shining Lamps"), discusses Afghanistan's condition and the core causes of its misery. He also contributed poetry to Millī Pātsūn ("National Uprising").

=== Poetry ===
The following Pashto poem, Lōyē tsō jərgē pə Pēx̌awar kawū (لویې څو جرګې په پېښور کوو; "Let us hold a few large jirgas in Peshawar"), is an example of his revolutionary poetry:

لویې څو جرګې په پېښور کوو
بیا به سم ګوزار په ستمګر کوو
دلته اباسین هلته پښین نیسي
یو ښکر شئ لښکر په قبضه ګر کوو
ټک به د ټوپک وي په اټک باندې
دغه شر محشر له یو اشر کوو
ځئ چې ځو ګله په مارګله پله
دا پرېکړه به مونږ په اشنغر کوو
پولې به معلومې کړو مونږ پل په پل
پام به د پالنې د دوتر کوو
و تړي واخان چې له بولان سره
لک وارې باور په خپل رهبر کوو
نه دي سرپرست چې قام پرست نه دي
دا د راز خبره مختصر کوو
پاتې دی ارمان دا د سوري افغان
یو وار به لاهور زېر او زبر کوو
تېر چې شي دا تور شبخون پر خور پښتون
بیا باچا اختر به په باختر کوو

== See also ==
- Afzal Khamosh
