= Laal (band) =

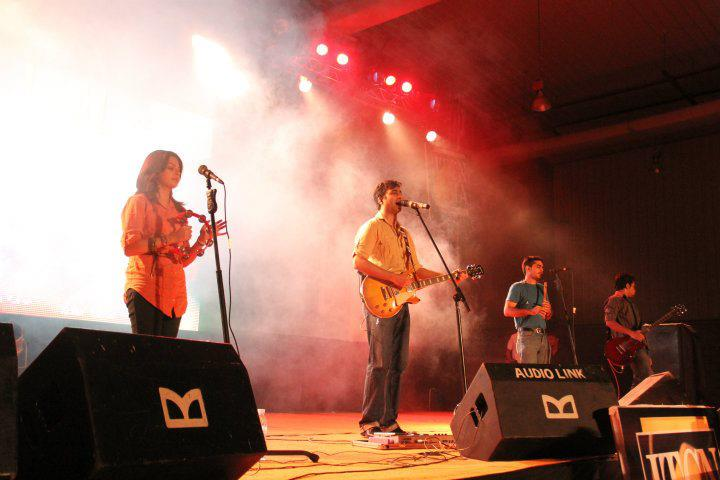
- Laal performing live at the Microsoft Pakistan Open Door 2011 in Karachi, Sindh.

Background information
- Origin: Lahore, Punjab, Pakistan
- Genres: Sufi rock, progressive rock, alternative rock
- Years active: 2008–present
- Labels: Fire Records, Times Music India
- Members: Taimur Rahman; Mahvash Waqar; Haider Rahman
- Past members: Shahram Azhar

Laal (Urdu: لال transl. Red) is a musical band from Pakistan known for singing socialist and progressive political songs, especially on the poetry written by leftist Urdu poets such as Faiz Ahmed Faiz and Habib Jalib.

== Band members ==
- Shahram Azhar (Former Member)- Guitar and Vocals
- Taimur Rahman- Guitar and Vocals
- Mahvash Waqar- Backup Vocals
- Haider Rahman- Flute

== Discography ==
The debut album is titled Umeed e Sahar and has been released by Fire Records (owned by Geo TV). The second album is titled "Utho Meri Dunya" and has been released by Times Music in India (2012) and Fire Records in Pakistan (2013).

=== Albums ===
- Umeed-e-Sahar (2009)
  - Main Nay Kaha (Musheer)
  - Umeed-e-Sahar
  - Sadaa
  - Jaag Punjab
  - Dastoor
  - Kal, Aaj Aur Kal
  - Zulmat
  - Mat Samjho
  - Na Judaa
  - Jaago
- Utho Meri Duniya (2012/2013)
  - Utho Meri Duniya
  - Fareeda
  - Jhoot Ka Uncha Sar
  - Meray Dil, Meray Musafir
  - Bay Dam
  - Chah Ka Ilzaam
  - Deshatgardi Murdabad
  - Ghum Na Kar
  - Na Honay Paee
  - Yaad

== Controversy ==
It was reported on 6 June 2014 that the official Facebook page of the band has been blocked by the Facebook at the request of the Pakistan Telecommunication Authority. Taimur Rahman, the vocalist and guitarist of the band, said: “The ban was out of the blue and very shameful, there was no controversial entry in the past week that deserved a ban on the page. Our short comments on news clippings we post are usually those that are objected to by the majority of people.” The page, however, was restored later. Pakistan Telecommunication Authority, on other hand, denied that they requested for blocking.

== See also ==
- List of Pakistani music bands
