= Taimur Rahman =

Pakistani political activist, professor and musician (born 1975)

- تیمور رحمان
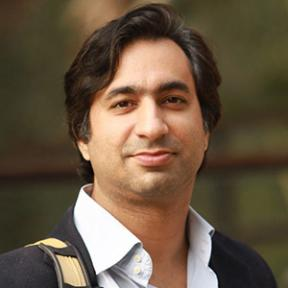
- Born: 27 May 1975 (age 51); Lahore, Punjab, Pakistan
- Education: Grinnell College; University of Sussex; SOAS University of London
- Occupations: Political activist; academic; musician
- Employer(s): Lahore University of Management Sciences; Lahore School of Economics
- Title: Secretary-General of the Mazdoor Kisan Party (formerly Communist Mazdoor Kissan Party)
- Relatives: S. A. Rahman (grandfather); Farhad Humayun (cousin)
- Musical career
- Genre: Popular rock
- Instruments: Vocals, guitar
- Label: Fire Records (Pakistan)

Taimur Rahman (Urdu/Punjabi: تیمور رحمان; born 27 May 1975) is a Pakistani political activist, professor at LUMS and musician who is serving as the Secretary-General of the Mazdoor Kisan Party (MKP), formerly Communist Mazdoor Kissan Party (CMKP). He is also the lead guitarist and spokesperson for the progressive music band Laal. He has taught political science at the Lahore University of Management Sciences (LUMS) since 2002. He also taught economics at the Lahore School of Economics from 1998 to 2003.

He is known for his socialist ideologies and has been outspoken in his criticism of capitalist exploitation and religious fundamentalism. He is the author of the book The Class Structure of Pakistan published by Oxford University Press. The book argues that Pakistan's framework is based on materialism, and won the Akhtar Hameed Khan Memorial Award for the "best book on Social Sciences" about Pakistan in 2012.

== Early life and education ==
Rahman comes from a "bourgeois" family, but he says his parents were engaged with the left movement since before he was born. He spent his childhood in military-ruled Pakistan under the Zia ul Haq government of the late 1970s-80s, which also influenced him politically. In his teenage years, he was involved with the theater as an actor, director and producer. He completed his schooling from Aitchison College, graduated from Grinnell College, obtained a master's degree from Sussex University and holds a PhD from the School of Oriental and African Studies.

== Political career ==
During Rahman's college life in the US, he got involved in Trade Union politics. He worked with the American Federation of Labor and Congress of Industrial Organizations (AFL–CIO), the International Brotherhood of Teamsters and various leftist parties. After returning to Pakistan in 1998, he joined the Communist Mazdoor Kissan Party (CMKP). He has been elected to district-level and state-level leadership positions in the party and was also elected as the General Secretary of CMKP. In 2015, the CMKP united with the Pakistan Mazdoor Kissan Party and People's National Congress to form Mazdoor Kissan Party (MKP). He is the current General Secretary of the MKP. He identifies as a Marxist–Leninist.

== Musical career ==
Taimur was interested in music from a young age and started playing the guitar when he was 17. He is the lead guitarist and spokesperson of the band Laal. His band is known for singing socialist and progressive political songs. The band has released several albums and has toured India, USA, England, etc.

== YouTube career ==
He has a YouTube channel, "Taimur_laal," where he makes videos ranging from philosophy and political science to history and current affairs. He has over 296K subscribers as of 21st October 2026.

== Personal life ==
He is married to Mahvash Waqar. He is the grandson of 5th Chief Justice of Pakistan, S.A.Rehman. His brother Jamal Rahman is a music producer while the late musician Farhad Humayun was his cousin.

== Bibliography ==
- Taimur Rahman (27 September 2012). The Class Structure of Pakistan. OUP Pakistan. ISBN 978-0-19-906507-3.
