= Pakistan Mazdoor Kissan Party =

Pakistan Mazdoor Kissan Party پاکستان مزدور کسان پارٹی
- Abbreviation: PMKP
- Founder: Afzal Khamosh
- Founded: 1974
- Dissolved: 2015
- Succeeded by: MKP
- Ideology: Agrarianism; Socialism

The Pakistan Mazdoor Kissan Party (PMKP) was a political party in Pakistan founded in 1974 by Afzal Khamosh.

On 20 December 2015, it merged with the Communist Mazdoor Kissan Party, forming the current Mazdoor Kisan Party.

== See also ==
- Communist Mazdoor Kissan Party
