= Shatir Ghaznavi =

Poet and writer (1905-1971)

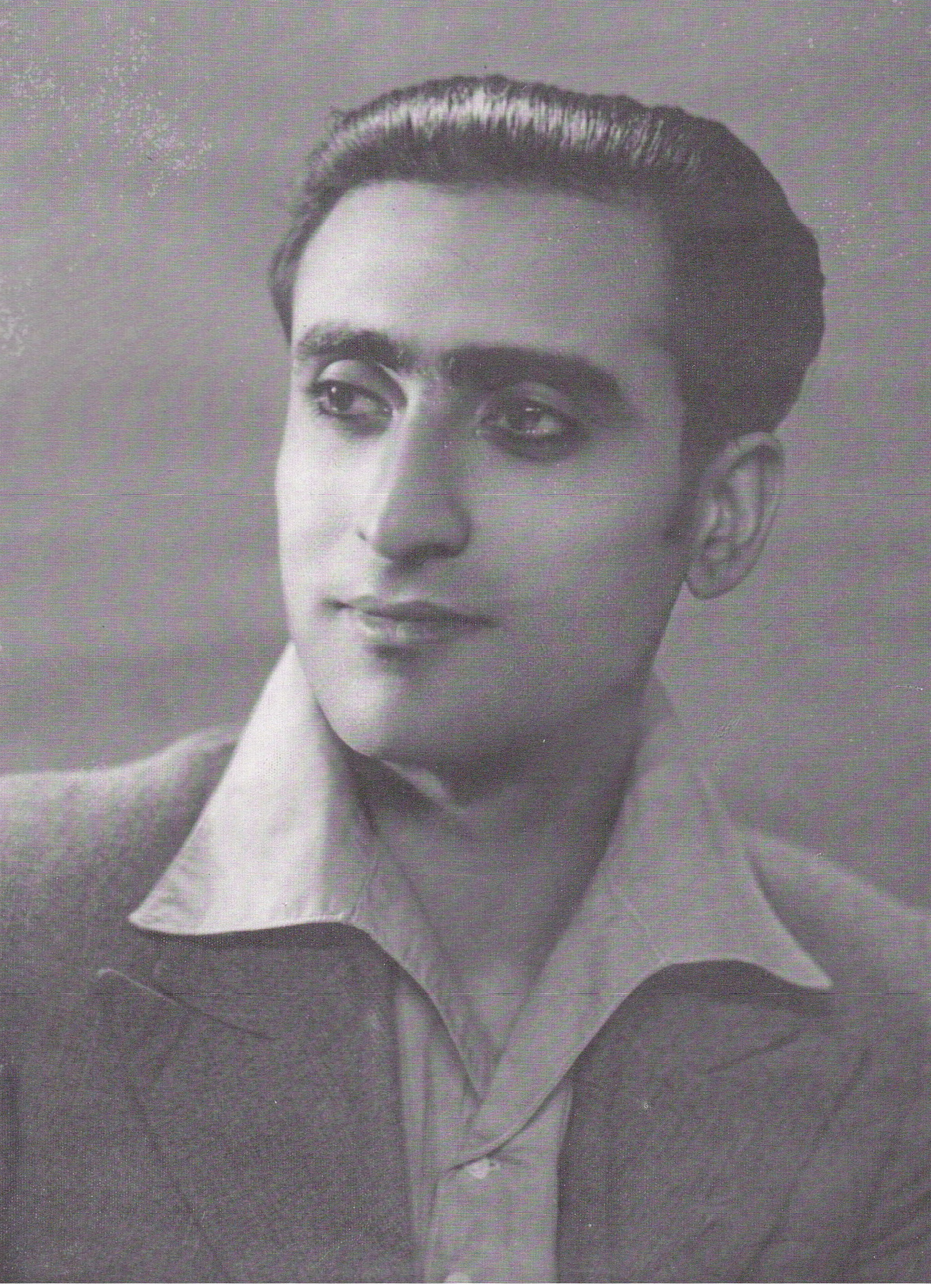
Portrait of Shatir Ghaznavi

Shatir Ghaznavi (1905 – 1971) was a playwright, lyricist, story/screenplay and dialogue writer for movies both in British India and later in Pakistan.

== Early life ==
He was born in 1905 in Peshawar, North-West Frontier Province, British India. His real name was Amin-ul-haq Khan but he adopted the pen name Shatir Ghaznavi. His ancestors had moved from Ghazni, Afghanistan to Peshawar, so he used "Ghaznavi" as his pen name to indicate his origins.

== Playwright ==
He had started writing poetry and literary pursuits from his school days. After completing his education he started his full-fledged literary career by launching a monthly literary magazine from Peshawar called Saghir. At the same time he started writing radio plays for the then All India Radio, Peshawar Station. The well-known literary figure and broadcaster of the time, Sajjad Sarwar Niazi was the director of the Peshawar Radio Station. He spotted the talent of Shatir Ghaznavi and encouraged the young playwright to hone his skills.

One of Shatir's celebrated plays, which was broadcast from Radio Peshawar in 1934, was Zartaj. It became an instant hit and was rebroadcast by all the radio stations of pre-partition India. Subsequently, after 1947, by all the radio stations of Pakistan until the nineteen sixties. Shatir Ghaznavi was one of the pioneers of the new Urdu drama.

Stage drama was on the decline and further, it was following Agha Hashar's tradition of flowery and poetic language. It was not a mirror of real life. There being no other outlet for drama, Shatir wrote for the radio. He introduced new topics and techniques. He brought drama closer to real life both in content and form. He got rid of the heavy, emotionally loaded, long-winded poetic dialogues. He picked up social topics and introduced real life characters who spoke like real living people. Even in his celebrated radio drama Zartaj in which Changez Khan and Halaku, grandfather and grandson, both fall in love with the same woman, speak in plain language like ordinary people.

== Film career ==
=== Bombay – Pre-Partition ===
After the departure of the station director, S.S. Niazi, who was transferred to All India Radio Bombay Station, Shatir moved to Lahore around 1934. He became editor of a film magazine Tasveer. Soon after he met the film producer and director A.R. Kardar, who later became one of the top movie makers of Bollywood. Shatir joined his team and moved with him first to Calcutta and then to Bombay. In 1935, he wrote the story and dialogues of a celebrated movie of the time Baghi Sipahi. This movie was released in 1936. It was a costume film. The movie was a hit and proved a turning point for Shatir's movie career. Kardar signed him up for his next two movies Milap and Mandir. Shatir wrote the stories and dialogues for both movies which were released in 1937. Shatir wrote the lyrics of Kardar's next movie, Pooja. Some of its songs became instant hits like Ravi Kay Oos Par Sajanva, Gori Gori O Gawalan Kee Chori, Chal Prem Kay Pankh Lagaain and Jub Toot Gaya Darpan Mun Ka. The music director was Anil Biswas, a great musician of his time. In 1941, Shatir wrote the lyrics of another movie, Swami, directed by Kardar. Music for the movie was composed by the well-known composer, Rafiq Ghaznavi. Shatir remained on Kardar's team from 1934 to 1942. Due to some misunderstanding, Shatir left Kardar's team. However, in parting, Kardar said to Shatir that the doors of his studios would always remain open for him.

Shatir joined J.K. Nanda as a writer and wrote the screenplay and dialogues of his film Ishara. It was directed by J.K. Nanda with Prithviraj Kapoor (the patriarch of the Kapoors like Raj Kapoor, Sashi and Rishi Kapoor, and Kareena and Karishma Kapoor) and Suraiya in the lead cast. Music was composed by famous music director Khwaja Khurshid Anwar. The movie was released in 1943. It was one of the heaviest grossing movies of the time. During this period, World War II was raging in Europe as well as East Asia. The Japanese forces bombed Calcutta in December 1943. Bombay was fearful of imminent bombing by the Japanese. The movie industry came to a standstill and because of the prevailing circumstances, Shatir returned with his family to Lahore.

=== Lahore – Pre-Partition in 1947 ===
Sometime after returning to Lahore and before the partition of India, Shatir wrote dialogues and songs for the film Bhai (1944 film) produced by Syed Ata Ullah Shah Hashmi under the banner of Caravan Pictures. In this movie Shatir himself performed a small role. Music was composed by two greats of the time, Master Ghulam Haider and Shyam Sunder. Some of the songs like, Panchi Dheeray Dheeray Gaa, Taroon Bhari Rateen Hain, Jhoolon Kee Aiyee Hai Bahar and Dunia Khushi Kee Hai became hits. After the success of this movie, Shatir wrote dialogues and lyrics for another movie Tehzeeb, produced by Ata Ullah Shah Hashmi under the banner of Caravan Pictures, in 1945. The main cast included Munawar Sultana, Satish, Manorma, Kalavati, and music was composed by Ghulam Haider. While the movie was still under production, the plan for partition of India was announced. Its producer, Krishan Kumar, a partner of Ata Ullah Shah Hashmi, took away the negatives of the movie to Bombay where it was completed and released under the name of "Kaneez" (1949 film). The cast of the movie was also changed there. This movie was released in 1949 in Lahore after the partition.

In June 1946, Shatir was assigned by Gupta Art Productions to write dialogues and lyrics for their film Aik Roaz. Daud Chand was the director and Shayam Sunder composed the music. The cast of the movie included Nasreen (mother of Salma Agha), Al Nasir, Asha Bhosle, Salim Raza etc. Before the movie could be completed, India was divided and Pakistan was created. The producer took its negatives to Bombay where the film was completed and released in India in 1948 and in Pakistan in 1949.

=== Lahore – Post-Partition ===
In 1946, Pride of India Theatre announced the making of their movie Chandar Kanta. Shatir was given the task of directing the movie. It was Shatir's first assignment as a director. For the role of heroine in the movie, Shatir discovered and introduced Geeta Bali for the first time. In later years Geeta Bali became a star of the Bollywood films. Music was composed by R.D. Joshi. During the making of the movie, subsequent to the partition, Hindu-Muslim riots broke out all over the Indian sub-continent including in Lahore. The studio where the movie was under production was set on fire and destroyed. The entire negative of the film was burnt and the movie could not be completed.

In 1947, Shatir wrote the dialogues and lyrics for Movie Maker's venture Khana Badosh. It was directed by Billoo Mehra. During the making of the film, India was divided. The producer took away the negatives to Bombay and completed the film. It was released in Bombay in December 1948 and on 15 April 1950 in Lahore. After the partition of India and establishment of Pakistan, the film industry in Pakistan came to a halt for a couple of years. Year 1950 witnessed a revival of film making in Lahore. Syed Ata Ullah Shah Hashmi launched his film Akailee in 1950. He called upon Shatir to write its script and the lyrics. M.M. Mehra was specially called from Bombay to direct it. Music was composed by Master Ghulam Haider, Nina, Santosh Kumar, Ragini, Charlie and Nazeer were cast for the film. In the same year Shatir wrote the screenplay for Pakland Picture's venture, Hum Watan.

After the completion of these movies, Shatir joined actor-director Nazir's film production unit known as Anees Pictures. Nazir entrusted Shatir with the task of writing the story and dialogues for his film Bheegee Palkain. The film was to be directed by Sharif Nayyar who was himself a story and dialogues writer. He preferred simple and short dialogues for the film. On the other hand, Nazir, who was playing the lead role in the movie and also was the policy maker, wanted flowery language and high pitched, emotionally loaded dialogues. It was a challenge for Shatir to satisfy both of them. Due to his skills, he was able to satisfy the opposing demands of the director and the film maker. The movie was released in 1952 but did not do well at the box office. Nazir was upset about it. Shatir had a two-year contract with Anis Pictures but he wanted to leave which he did in a friendly atmosphere. Nazir was reluctant to let Shatir go, he tried to stop Shatir with the promise that after his new Punjabi film, Shehri Babu (1953 film), with which Shatir had nothing to do, he would launch his next Urdu movie for which he would need Shatir. Later, in spite of Nazir's repeated requests to rejoin his unit, Shatir did not go.

In 1954, J.C. Anand of Eveready Pictures invited Shatir to write the dialogues and lyrics for their film Sassi (1954 film). It proved to be a success at the boxoffice. It was directed by Daud Chand and music was composed by Ghulam Ahmed Chishti. Central roles were played by Sabiha Khanum, Sudhir and Asha Posley.

Subsequent to this, Shatir wrote stories and dialogues for a string of films produced/directed by Syed Ata Ullah Hashmi. The first super hit movie on the box office was Naukar in 1955. Yet another hit movie which Shatir wrote was Choti Begum in 1956. In 1957, Shatir wrote the dialogues for Daata. Naya Daur was written in 1958 followed by another of Shatir's hit movie Bhabi in 1960.

Subsequently, Shatir joined Shabab Kiranvi's production unit, Shabab Films. He wrote dialogues and screenplays for a number of Shabab Kiranvi's movies including Mehtab (1962), Shukria (1964) and Aaina (1966), a super hit movie, followed by Insaniyat (1967 film) which was very successful at the box office.

== Awards ==
Shatir Ghaznavi was awarded the President's Award (instituted by the then President Muhammad Ayub Khan for Best Dialogue writer in 1962.

== Death ==
Failing health prevented Shatir from pursuing his literary and film career. He became a recluse in the later part of his life as one of his sons, who was an officer in the Pakistan Army, was reported missing in the Indo-Pakistani war of 1971 in present day Bangladesh. Before his son was identified a POW, Shatir died in his sleep in Lahore on 22 October 1971 where he was interred in the historic Miani Sahib Graveyard.
