= Hakim Ahmad Shuja =

Pakistani Urdu and Persian poet (1893–1969)

- حکیم احمد شجاع
- Born: Ahmad Shuja; 4 November 1893; Lahore, Punjab, British India (present-day Pakistan)
- Died: 4 January 1969 (aged 76); Lahore, Pakistan
- Resting place: Miani Sahib Graveyard, Lahore, Pakistan
- Children: Anwar Kamal Pasha (son)
- Relatives: Shamim Bano (daughter-in-law)

Hakim Ahmad Shuja MBE (Urdu: حکیم احمد شجاع; 4 November 1893 – 4 January 1969) was a prominent Pakistani poet, playwright and lyricist, who published his works in the Urdu and Persian languages.

== Background ==
Hakim Ahmad Shuja was born in an old and prominent family of mystics and Islamic religious scholars, who had migrated from Arabia, Afghanistan and Turkey to India during the 10th-12th centuries AD. From his paternal side, he was a direct descendant of Abdul Qadir Gilani, Abu Ayyub al-Ansari and Abdul Wahid bin Zaid, and from his maternal side, of the Sadozai tribe which at one time ruled Afghanistan. During the times of the Sultans of Delhi, the family came to prominence as religious divines and Hakims i.e. practitioners of the traditional Hikmat (the Unani, or Greek system of medicine) and by the time of the Mughal Emperor Akbar the Great (c.1542-1605) they were established as court physicians at Lahore, in the Bhati Gate area of the Old City. Later, family members served as Chief Qazis (or Qadis) at Lahore and Kashmir under Afghan (Durrani) rule, and a branch were ministers during Ranjit Singh's Sikh rule. The Hakim family, or 'Hakim-Khana' of Old Lahore were mostly Sunni Muslims, but during the 18th and 19th centuries a branch the 'Fakir-Khana' became Shias. Ahmad Shuja's father, Hakim Shuja-ed-din, was a Sufi mystic of the Chishtiya order and one of the early pioneers of the Urdu literary press in Lahore, bringing out the famous Shor-i-Mahshar journal and participating actively in the work of the Anjuman-i-Himayat-i-Islam and Anjuman-i-Punjab associations.

== Early life and career ==
Hakim Ahmad Shuja was the only son of his parents, who both died when he was still a minor, and was brought up largely by an elder cousin, Hakim Amin-ed-din, a barrister. After receiving basic education in Arabic and Quranic studies at home, and initial Sufi training under various mystics in both Chishti and Qadiri traditions, he was admitted for 'English education' to the old Central Model School, Lahore and later went to the famous Aligarh Muslim University, from where he graduated with honours. For some time, Ahmad Shuja then worked as a lecturer at the Osmania University in Hyderabad state (Deccan) but was not happy and returned to Lahore to seek employment there. After several journalistic and academic ventures, including being the editor of the Urdu literary journal Hazar Dastaan in 1922–23, he eventually settled down to regular service in the secretariat of the Punjab Legislative Assembly, finally retiring as Secretary to the Punjab Assembly in the 1950s.

== Writings ==
Hakim Ahmad Shuja was a prolific and versatile writer indeed, producing several collections of Urdu and Persian poetry, countless essays and belles-lettres published in newspapers and journals throughout India (and later Pakistan), one of the earliest translations of the Quran in Punjabi language, several dramatic works in collaboration with Imtiaz Ali Taj, Agha Hashar Kashmiri and other theatrical producers, and, later on, screenplays and lyrics for the early Indo-Pakistan cinema. However, his fame today rests chiefly on these noted works: "Lahore ka Chelsea" (1967; 1989 reprint), a collection of memoirs of Old Lahore; "Khoon-Baha" (1962), some of his other personal memoirs; "Gard-i-Karvan" (1950s; reprint 1960), a collection of poems and essays in praise of the Islamic prophet Muhammad and the 'Ahl i Bayt' (members of the Prophet's family) as exemplars of the 'Ideal' Muslim character; and his lovely, lyrical poems, some of which were later successfully adapted for film songs. These works reflect his idealism and humane and deeply mystical faith and a Romanticism which reflects both the typical Urdu and Persian poetic traditions, as well as the influence of Western writers such as Shelley, Thomas Carlyle, Goethe and Victor Hugo.

== Later life and legacy ==
Hakim Ahmad Shuja continued to write until the time of his death in 1969. In the 1950s and 1960s, he became especially interested in the potentialities of film-making and cinema. Perhaps because of the involvement of his son Anwar Kamal Pasha, one of South Asia's early and most renowned film directors, in this genre. Many well-known lyrics and songs of his popular films, such as Tu Laakh Challay Ri Gori and Ham Bhi Parrhay Hain Rahon Mein, were in fact written originally as poems by Shuja and later adapted by him and his team of assistants for film. Some of these songs/lyrics are at times wrongly ascribed to some of these assistants, such as poet Qateel Shifai. However, that Shuja had already been involved to a lesser extent in writing songs/lyrics and also stories for Urdu/Hindi cinema even earlier, is borne by his early lyrics for the song "Hairaat-e-Nazzaraa Aakir", sung by the Kundan Lal Saigal, and also his writing of the storylines of the Indian Bollywood films like Behram Khan, Sheesh Mahal and Shahida, the early Pakistani film from 1949. In many ways, thus, he had a direct influence and bearing upon the development of both early Indian and Pakistani literature and cinema. In addition, he also made a significant contribution to the early development of Urdu language, linguistics and etymology as permanent secretary and one of the main compilers/editors of Pakistan's Official Language Committee, 1949, responsible for the standardization of official and court terms, from English to Urdu.

Shuja was a contemporary of and associated with people like Agha Hashar Kashmiri, Imtiaz Ali Taj, Abul Kalam Azad, Allama Iqbal, Sir Sikandar Hayat Khan, Hakim Ajmal Khan, Sohrab Modi, and Muhammad Ali Jauhar.

== See also ==
- Ghaus-e-Azam
- Khwaja Abdullah Ansari
- Urdu literature
- Anwar Kamal Pasha
- Riffat Hassan
- Yawar Hayat Khan
