= Gulshan Ara Syed =

Pakistani ghazal singer

- گلشن آرا سید
- Born: Mymensingh, East Pakistan
- Occupation: Singer
- Years active: 1977 - present
- Television: PTV
- Spouse: Dr. Shaukat
- Awards: Cassette Melody Award

Gulshan Ara Syed is a Pakistani ghazal singer known for vocalizing the Urdu ghazal Tumharay Shehar Ka Mausam Bara Suhana Lagay.

== Life and career ==
Gulshan Ara was born in Mymensingh, East Pakistan (now Bangladesh). She migrated to Pakistan in 1979. Her husband Dr. Shaukat was a government official appointed in Islamabad.

She got her music education from Ghulam Mohammad Khan and Riazuddin Khan. She appeared in PTV's music program Khusboo for the first time in 1980 and became famous overnight. Later, her music albums "Gulshan Ara Syed" (1983), "Meri Pasand" (1984), and Shaam-e-ghazal" (1986) were released and got encouraging appreciation from ghazal lovers. She also received the Cassette Melody Award. Gulshan Ara sang many ghazals but Qaisarul Jaffery's ghazal Tumharey Shehr Ka Mausam Bara Suhana Lagey remained forever notable. This specific ghazal has been sung by several ghazal singers from the subcontinent, but Gulshan Ara has added her unique touch to it.

== TV shows ==
Year	Title	Role	Network
1980	Khushboo	Herself	PTV
1990	Mehak	Herself	NTM

== Albums ==
Title	Album details
Gulshan Ara Syed	Released in 1983; Label: EMI Pakistan
Meri Pasand	Released in 1984; Label: EMI Pakistan
Shaam-e-Ghazal	Released in 1986; Label: EMI Pakistan
Yaadgar Ghazlein	Released in 1988; Label: EMI Pakistan

== Discography ==
- Tumhare Shehar Ka Mausam (1977)
- Ke Ghungroo Toot Gaye (1983)
- Jalwa Dikha Ke (1983)
- Hato Kahe Ko Jhooti Banao Batiyan (1983)
- Zindagi Ki Raahon Mein (1983)
- Dil Lagane Ki (1983)
- Dil Kis Ke Tasawwar Mein (1983)
- Nigahen Dar Pe Lagi (Meri Pasand -1984)
- Har Baat Pe Kehte Ho (1984)
- Hum Ne Tumko Pyar Kiya Hai (Meri Pasand -1984)
- Jo Log Jan Boojh Kar (Meri Pasand -1984)
- Khabar Koi Meri Agar (Meri Pasand -1984)
- Baten Hain Ujli Ujli (Meri Pasand -1984)
- Mariz-E-Mohabbat Unhi Ka (Meri Pasand -1984)
- Kuch Yaadgar-E-Shehar (Meri Pasand -1984)
- Bin Bulae Haseenon Ka (Meri Pasand -1984)
- Jo Bhi Tere Faqir Hote Hain (Sham-E-Ghazal · 1986)
- Ishq Da Jalwa (1986)
- Garmi-E-Hasrat-E-Nakaam Se (Sham-E-Ghazal · 1986)
- Gham Us Pe Aaskar (Sham-E-Ghazal · 1986)
- Aaye Na Ek Roz Bhi (Sham-E-Ghazal · 1986)
- Tere Baghair Mukammil (Sham-E-Ghazal · 1986)
- Hawas Naseeb Nazar Ko (Sham-E-Ghazal · 1986)
- Be Dam Huwe (Sham-E-Ghazal · 1986)
- Ki Wafa Hum Ne To (Sham-E-Ghazal · 1986)
- Qurbaton Mein Bhi Judai (Sham-E-Ghazal · 1986)
- Garmiye Hasrate (Yaadgar Ghazlen Vol. 6 · 1990)
- Mujhe Pyar Na Karo Itna (TV Hits · 2014)
- Mere Mitwa (TV Hits · 2014)
- Aaja Kahin Door Chalein (TV Hits · 2014)
- Yeh Sharam Hai Tere Dastan (TV Hits · 2015)
