= Fire Records (Pakistan) =

Pakistani record label

- Status: defunct
- Distributor: AAG TV
- Country of origin: Pakistan
- Location: Karachi

Fire Records (Pakistan) was a Pakistani record label owned by AAG TV. It managed many artists between 2006 and 2013. According to a Pakistani newspaper owned by the same group that owned the record label, the label held a virtual monopoly over major music releases in Pakistan in the mid-to-late 2000s. The record label has been a subject of controversy since its inception and after it ceased operations as being responsible for the decline of the Pakistani music industry.

Music production and music distribution to the general public change with the times also and so they did in Pakistan. As of 2011, according to The Express Tribune newspaper, there seems to be a 'stalemate' in Pakistan's music economy and business which also affected the above recording label Fire Records (Pakistan).

Another Pakistani newspaper, Dawn, delivers even worse news in 2017. Its article goes into the recent pop music's over-commercialization and subsequent control of music artists by the recording label companies such as Fire Records (Pakistan). Later how then the public trends changed from now old cassette tapes to CDs to digital streaming of music on the public internet now.

== Artists ==
- Amanat Ali
- Abrar-ul-Haq
- Ahmed Jahanzeb
- Ali Azmat
- Ali Zafar
- Atif Aslam
- Attaullah Khan Esakhelvi
- Call (band)
- Hadiqa Kiani
- Humaira Arshad
- Jal
- Jawad Ahmad
- Junaid Jamshed
- Laal
- Najam Khan
- Najam Sheraz
- Rabi Peerzada
- Rahat Fateh Ali Khan
- Roxen
- Sami Yusuf
- Sajid & Zeeshan
- Sajjad Ali
- Shahbaz Khan
- Shehzad Roy
- Strings
- The Sketches
- Waris Baig
- Zeb and Haniya
- Zohaib Hassan

== See also ==
- Rearts
- List of record labels
