= Habib Jalib =

Pakistani poet and political activist (1928–1993)

- حبیب جالب
- Portrait of Habib Jalib
- Born: Habib Ahmad Khan; 24 March 1928; Hoshiarpur, Punjab, British India (present-day Punjab, India)
- Died: 13 March 1993 (aged 64); Lahore, Punjab, Pakistan
- Occupations: Poet; political activist
- Children: Jamila Noor Jalib; Tahira Habib Jalib; Nasir Jalib
- Writing career
- Language: Punjabi; Urdu
- Subjects: Politics; anti-authoritarianism; socialism; anti-oppression; Islamic mysticism; anti-dictatorship
- Notable awards: Nigar Awards; Nishan-i-Imtiaz
- Movement: Progressive Writers' Movement

Habib Jalib (Note: Punjabi, Urdu: حبیب جالب) (Punjabi pronunciation: [ɦəbib d͡ʒaːləb]; 24 March 1928 – 13 March 1993) was a Pakistani revolutionary poet and left-wing political activist who opposed martial law, authoritarianism, military dictatorship and state oppression. He wrote several poems in Punjabi and Urdu and was referred to as the "poet of the masses" by his contemporary Faiz Ahmad Faiz.

He opposed military coups and government administrators and was duly jailed several times for this stance. He is widely respected in Pakistan for never compromising on his principles.

Journalist Hamid Mir believes Sufism played a major role in Jalib's political stance against dictatorship.

== Early life ==
Habib Jalib was born as Habib Ahmad on 24 March 1928 in a village near Hoshiarpur, Punjab, British India. He migrated to Pakistan after the partition of India. Later he worked as a proofreader for Daily Imroze of Karachi. He was a progressive writer and soon started to attract the audience with his enthusiastic recitation of poetry. He wrote in plain language, adopted a simple style and addressed common people and their issues. But the conviction behind his words, the music of his voice and his emotional energy coupled with the sensitivity of the socio-political context is what stirred the audience.

== Political views ==
Criticizing those who supported Ayub Khan's regime, he wrote:

کہیں گیس کا دھواں ہے
کہیں گولیوں کی بارش
شب عہد کم نگاہی
تجھے کس طرح سراہیں
Kahin gas ka dhuan hae
kahin golion ki baarish
Shab-e-ehd-e-kum nigahi
tujhay kis tarah sarahein

There is smoke of teargas in the air
and the bullets are raining all around
How can I praise thee
the night of the period of shortsightedness

Jalib could never reconcile with the dictatorship of Ayub Khan. When Ayub enforced his tailor-made constitution in the country in 1962, former prime minister Chaudhry Muhammad Ali likened Ayub Khan to the Clock Tower of Lyallpur, visible from all directions.

Jalib wrote Dastur, verses of which include:

Original Urdu

دیپ جس کا محلات ہی میں جلے

چند لوگوں کی خوشیوں کو لے کر چلے

وہ جو سائے میں ہر مصلحت کے پلے

ایسے دستور کو، صبح بے نور کو

میں نہیں مانتا، میں نہیں جانتا

میں بھی خائف نہیں تختہ دار سے

میں بھی منصور ہوں کہہ دو اغیار سے

کیوں ڈراتے ہو زنداں کی دیوار سے

ظلم کی بات کو، جہل کی رات کو

میں نہیں مانتا، میں نہیں جانتا

پھول شاخوں پہ کھلنے لگے، تم کہو

جام رندوں کو ملنے لگے، تم کہو

چاک سینوں کے سلنے لگے، تم کہو

اس کھلے جھوٹ کو، ذہن کی لوٹ کو

میں نہیں مانتا، میں نہیں جانتا

تم نے لوٹا ہے صدیوں ہمارا سکوں

اب نہ ہم پر چلے گا تمہارا فسوں

چارہ گر میں تمہیں کس طرح سے کہوں

تم نہیں چارہ گر، کوئی مانے، مگر

میں نہیں مانتا، میں نہیں جانتا

English Transliteration
diip jis kā mahallāt hī meñ jale

chand logoñ kī ḳhushiyoñ ko le kar chale

vo jo saa.e meñ har maslahat ke pale

aise dastūr ko sub.h-e-be-nūr ko

maiñ nahīñ māntā maiñ nahīñ jāntā

maiñ bhī ḳhā.if nahīñ taḳhta-e-dār se

maiñ bhī mansūr huuñ kah do aġhyār se

kyuuñ Darāte ho zindāñ kī dīvār se

zulm kī baat ko jahl kī raat ko

maiñ nahīñ māntā maiñ nahīñ jāntā

phuul shāḳhoñ pe khilne lage tum kaho

jaam rindoñ ko milne lage tum kaho

chaak sīnoñ ke silne lage tum kaho

is khule jhuuT ko zehn kī luuT ko

maiñ nahīñ māntā maiñ nahīñ jāntā

tum ne luuTā hai sadiyoñ hamārā sukūñ

ab na ham par chalegā tumhārā fusūñ

chārāgar dardmandoñ ke bante ho kyuuñ

tum nahīñ chārāgar koī maane magar

maiñ nahīñ māntā maiñ nahīñ jāntā

English translation

The light which shines only in palaces

Burns up the joy of the people in the shadows

Derives its strength from others' weakness

That kind of system,

like dawn without light

I refuse to acknowledge, I refuse to accept

I am not afraid of execution,

Tell the world that I am the martyr

How can you frighten me with prison walls?

This overhanging doom,

this night of ignorance,

I refuse to acknowledge, I refuse to accept

"Flowers are budding on branches", that's what you say,

"Every cup overflows", that's what you say,

"Wounds are healing themselves", that's what you say,

These bare-faces lies,

this insult to the intelligence,

I refuse to acknowledge, I refuse to accept

For centuries you have all stolen our peace of mind

But your power over us is coming to an end

Why do you pretend you can cure pain?

Even if some claim that you've healed them,

I refuse to acknowledge, I refuse to accept.

Devnagri
दीप जिस का महल्लात ही में जले

चंद लोगों की ख़ुशियों को ले कर चले

वो जो साए में हर मस्लहत के पले

ऐसे दस्तूर को सुब्ह-ए-बे-नूर को

मैं नहीं मानता मैं नहीं जानता

मैं भी ख़ाइफ़ नहीं तख़्ता-ए-दार से

मैं भी मंसूर हूँ कह दो अग़्यार से

क्यूँ डराते हो ज़िंदाँ की दीवार से

ज़ुल्म की बात को जहल की रात को

मैं नहीं मानता मैं नहीं जानता

फूल शाख़ों पे खिलने लगे तुम कहो

जाम रिंदों को मिलने लगे तुम कहो

चाक सीनों के सिलने लगे तुम कहो

इस खुले झूट को ज़ेहन की लूट को

मैं नहीं मानता मैं नहीं जानता

तुम ने लूटा है सदियों हमारा सुकूँ

अब न हम पर चलेगा तुम्हारा फ़ुसूँ

चारागर दर्दमंदों के बनते हो क्यूँ

तुम नहीं चारागर कोई माने मगर

मैं नहीं मानता मैं नहीं जानता

== Habib Jalib's poems used in Pakistani films ==
In another incident which has become a part of the resistance folklore of the country, the Governor of West Pakistan, the Nawab of Kalabagh, invited filmstar Neelo to dance in front of Shah Reza Pahlavi of Iran. She refused and as a consequence the police was sent to force and bring her, which led to her attempting to commit suicide. This incident inspired a poem by Jalib, which was later included by Neelo's husband Riaz Shahid in the film Zarqa (1969). The poem was titled Raqs Zanjeer Pehan Kar Bhi Kiya Jaata Hai (The dance of the chains).

تو کہ ناواقفِ آدابِ غلامی ہے ابھی
رقص زنجیر پہن کر بھی کیا جاتا ہے
Tu kay nawaqif-e-aadab-e-ghulami hae abhi
Raqs zanjeer pehan kar bhi kiya jata hai.

You are not aware of the protocol of a king's court. Sometimes one has to dance (before them) with the chains on oneself.

- The above Nazm/Song was included in film producer Riaz Shahid's film Zarqa (1969) in Mehdi Hassan's vocals which became a super-hit film song among the public in 1969 in Pakistan.
- "Zulm Rahay Aur Amn Bhi Ho, Kaya Mumkin Hai Tum Hi Kaho" Sung by both Noor Jehan and Mehdi Hassan in film Yeh Aman (1971), lyrics by Habib Jalib and music by A. Hameed. This film song also became very popular.

== Hyderabad Conspiracy Case ==
On the third day after the death of his twelve-year-old son in 1976, Hyderabad, Sindh law enforcement authorities surrounded his house and arrested him in a conspiracy case.

A total of 55 people were arrested in this case, including Khan Abdul Wali Khan, Mir Ghos Bakhsh Bizenjo, Attaullah Mengal, Khair Bakhsh Marri and Qasim Zia.

=== Bhutto's government ===
In 1972, Zulfiqar Ali Bhutto came to power in Pakistan after the 1971 war with India and a new independent country called Bangladesh emerged from former East Pakistan. Zulfiqar Ali Bhutto came to power in former West Pakistan, thereafter called simply Pakistan.

After Bhutto's hanging, Habib Jalib wrote the following poem:

ٹوٹا ہے کہاں اس کا جادو
اک نعرہ بنا ہے اس کا لہو
ثابت ہوا دھڑکن دھڑکن پر وہ شخص حکومت کرتا تھا
لڑتا تھا وہ اپنے جیسوں سے ہم سے تو محبت کرتا تھا
His magic has not been broken
His blood became a slogan
It has been proved, that he ruled his people's hearts
He used to fight with the people like him (Feudal Lords), but with the (poor) people like us, he used to love.

=== Zia-ul-Haq's martial law ===
During General Zia-ul-Haq's dictatorship, Jalib wrote a poem on Zia, in which he asked how he could write darkness as Zia ( Zia literally means light in Urdu).

ظلمت کو ضیا، صر صر کو صبا، بندے کو خدا کیا لکھنا
Darkness as light, Hot desert wind as a morning breeze
How can I write a human as God?

=== Benazir Bhutto's government ===
After General Zia-ul-Haq's death in 1988, Benazir Bhutto came to power and released Habib Jalib. Disappointed at the state of the nation, when asked if he felt any change after democracy, he said:

حال اب تک وہی ہیں فقیروں کے
دن پھرے ہیں فقط وزیروں کے
ہر بلاول ہے دیس کا مقروض
پاؤں ننگے ہیں بے نظیروں کے
Haal ab tak wahi hain faqiroan kay
Din phiray hain faqat waziroan kay
her Bilawal hai Dais ka maqrooz
paoon nangay hain Benazeeroan kay

The status of the poor is still the same
the days of the ministers have indeed changed
every Bilawal (name of the only son of Benazir Bhutto) of the country is under debt
while Benazirs (i.e the poor) of the country walk without shoes

== Death ==
Habib Jalib died on 13 March 1993 and was laid to rest in Shah Fareed Graveyard, Sabzazar, Lahore, Pakistan.

== Poetry ==
Some poems in his own voice

- ظلمت کو ضیا Zulmat Ko Zia
- قائدِ اعظم دیکھ رہے ہو اپنا پاکستان Quaid-e-Azam Dek Rahe Ho Apna Pakistan
- فرنگی کا جو میں دربان ہوتا Farangi Ka Jo May Darban Hota
- مزارے لغارے Mazaaray Laghaaray
- وطن کو کچھ نہیں خطرہ Wathan Ko Kuch Nahi Khathra
- یہ منصف بھی تو قیدی ہیں Ye Munsif Bhi Tho Qaidi Hain
- گل سن Gal Sun (Punjabi)
- اس قانون سے نفرت ہے عداوت ہے مجھے "ise qanoon se nafrat adawat hain mujhe"
- میں نے اس سے یہ کہا Mein Ne Uss Se Yeh Kaha
- دستور – میں نہیں مانتا Dastoor (Main Nahi Manta)
- جن تھا یا ریفرنڈم تھا Jin Tha Ya Referendum Tha

== Recent tributes ==
Laal band remastered and remixed the revolutionary poem "Dastoor" in Habib Jalib's voice and included it in their 2009 album Umeed-e-Sahar. In April 2014, an event was organized in Islamabad, Pakistan to pay tributes to Shayer-i-Awam (the people's poet), Habib Jalib. Many Pakistani celebrities including the noted journalist Mujahid Barelvi, Zehra Nigah and Taimur Rahman took the stage and paid tributes to him.

== Awards and recognition ==
On 23 March 2009, President of Pakistan awarded the Nishan-e-Imtiaz (Order of Excellence) award (posthumously) for the legendary poet, which was received by his daughter, Tahira Habib Jalib.

Friends of Liberation War Hounor (Bangladesh) in 2013, received by his daughter Tahira Habib Jalib.

== See also ==
- Faiz Ahmed Faiz
- Communist Party of Pakistan
- Ahmed Faraz
- Mir Gul Khan Naseer
- Ustad Daman

== Books ==
- Sir-e-Maqtal
- Zikr Behte Khoon Ka
- Gumbad-e-Bedar
- Kulyaat e Habib Jalib
- Is Shehar-e-Kharabi Main
- Goshay Main Qafas K
- Harf-e-Haqq
- Harf-e-Sar-e-Daar
- Ehad-e-Sitam
- Rat kalehni
- Jalib Bethi
