= Mir Nooruddin Mengal =

Pakistani politician (1952 - 2010)

Mir Noor-ud-din Mengal
- میر نورالدین مینگل
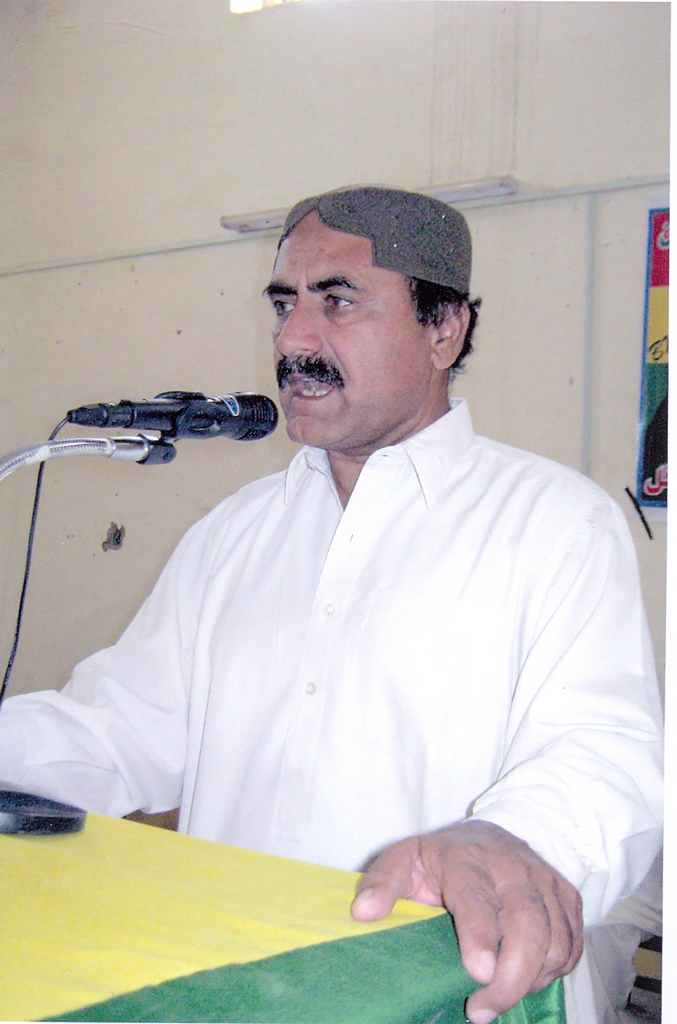
- Mir Noor-ud-din Mengal Shaheed

Personal details
- Born: 13 July 1952 Kalat, Balochistan
- Died: 13 October 2010 (aged 58) Kalat, Balochistan
- Party: Balochistan National Party; Pakistan National Party; Baloch Students Organization
- Education: University of Engineering and Technology, Lahore

Mir Noor-ud-din Mengal (Urdu: میر نورالدین مینگل; 13 July 1952 – 13 October 2010) was a prominent Baloch Pakistani politician who played a significant role in Balochistan's political landscape for nearly four decades, from 1970 to 2010.

== Early life ==
A member of the Zagar Mengal tribe, he was the nephew of the Baloch national poet Mir Gul Khan Nasir. His father, Mir Lal Bakhsh Mengal, and his mother, a member of the Gichki family from Makran, raised him alongside his seven siblings.

Mir Noor-ud-din was named after Sardar Noordin Mengal (an uncle of Sardar Attaullah Mengal and a close friend of Mir Lal Baksh Mengal who died in a road traffic accident near Kalat). He was brought up in his hometown of Kalat. His father was a prominent tribal and political figure of Balochistan while his uncle Gul Khan Nasir belonged to the top tier Baloch leadership along with Ghaus Bakhsh Bizenjo, Abdul Aziz Kurd and, later, Sardar Ataullah Khan Mengal and Khair Bux Marri. As a result of this he was exposed to politics from a very early age. This exposure instilled a nascent sense of political awareness in him which, with age, kept growing.

Mengal passed high school from Kalat and after matriculating from Noshki, enrolled in F.Sc Pre-Engineering in Government Science College, Quetta.

After he had finished college, Gul Khan Nasir advised Mengal to get into a university instead of just relying on a college degree. Following his uncle's advice, he applied to Patrice Lumumba University and was accepted. Mengal had chosen a University in Moscow because at that time it was a very common practice for Baloch students to go to Russia in pursuit of a higher education but because of his political activities (which he had already begun by 1970 from Baloch Students Organization's (BSO) platform) his name was put on the Exit Control List and he was unable to go.

With that door closed, Mengal applied for Mining Engineering at University of Engineering and Technology, Lahore in 1973 and was, once again, accepted. He spent four years in Lahore and graduated with a B.E Degree in 1977.

== Politics ==
Throughout his student life, Mengal had been active in politics and from 1974 to 1976 had served as BSO's Vice Chairman. During his time in Lahore he had opened sixteen units of BSO in different cities of Punjab. After returning to Quetta he served a second term as the Vice Chairman of BSO from 1978 to 1980 and while he managed to secure a job as a Mining Engineer in a private mining company, his political life remained dominant over his professional life. So much so, in fact, that he eventually quit his job to devote all his time and energy to politics.

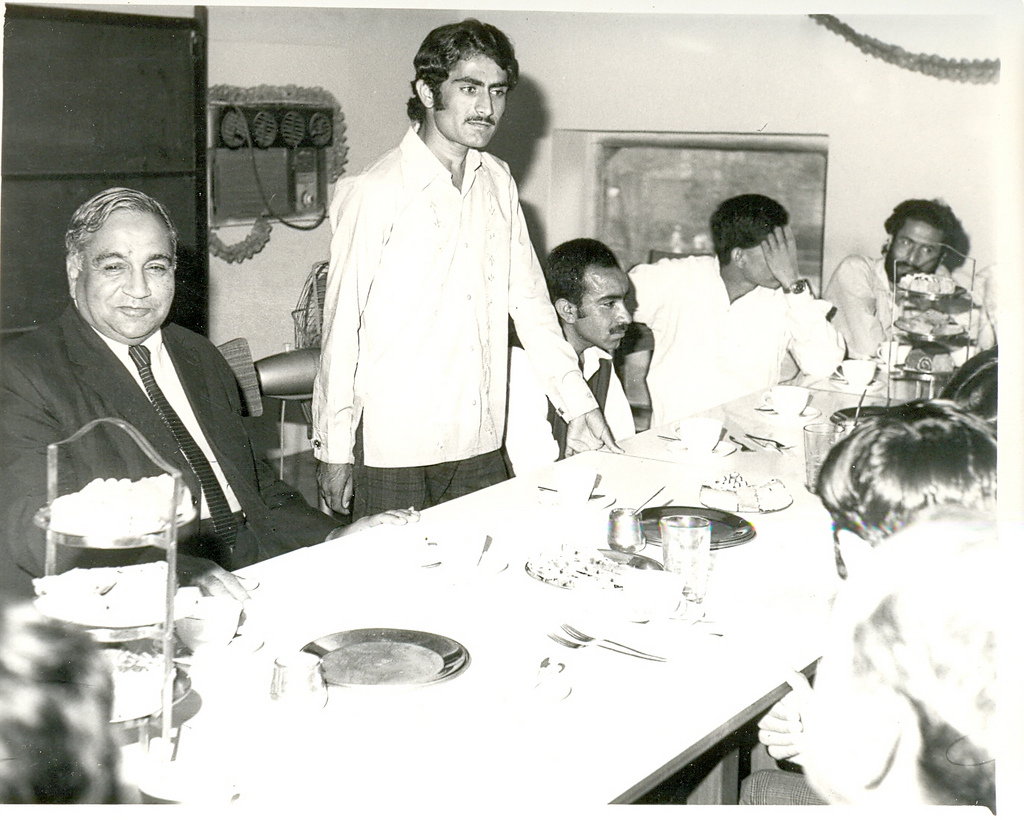
Nooruddin Mengal giving a speech in Lahore as the Vice Chairman of BSO. Mahmud Ali Kasuri (left) is sitting beside him.

After serving his second term as the Vice Chairman of BSO, he joined the political party of Ghaus Bakhsh Bizenjo, The Pakistan National Party. After Mir Ghaus Bakhsh's death in August 1989, the leadership of the party shifted to Mir Bizen Bizenjo but he wasn't able to hold on to it for long. When Mir Bizen vacated the office of the Party President, PNP was thrown into turmoil. During this tumultuous time the position of Party Organizer was also vacant, so Mir Noor-ud-din Mengal was named the Organizer of the Party. After successfully organizing the council session of PNP where Mir Hasil Bizenjo was named president, Mengal went back to being the Deputy Organizer of the Party while Raziq Bugti became the Organizer. A few months after this, in 1992, Mir Noor-ud-din was elected as the Vice President of PNP, an office he held until the merger of PNP with BNM in 1996.

By 1996 it seemed that no single political party was able to represent the whole Province of Balochistan. In light of this discussions began between the leaders of Pakistan National Party and Baloch National Movement. Mengal played a central role in these talks and was pivotal in the merger of the two parties to form Balochistan National Party. Mir Noor-ud-din was elected as a member of the Central Executive Committee of BNP after the merger and held the position until his death in October 2010.

Mengal remained an active and loyal member of the BNP right up until his death. When the Balochistan National Party was split into two factions, i.e., BNP Awami which was a forward block led by Israr Zehri, and BNP which was led by Akhtar Mengal, Mir Noor-ud-din remained in BNP proving his loyalty. He set up his political base in his hometown of Kalat and was arrested and persecuted for his political beliefs numerous times from 2000 to 2007 . In 2006, Balochistan National Party announced a Long March against, what they termed, the continued exploitation of the Baloch land and people by the Establishment especially during the dictatorship of General Pervez Musharaff. The long march was to start from Gwadar and culminate at Quetta. Before the long march could even begin, the Government launched a crackdown against the BNP Leaders. Party President Akhtar Mengal was the first to be arrested triggering protests throughout Balochistan. After Akhtar Mengal's arrest Mir Noor-ud-din Mengal was chosen as the Acting President of BNP. On 3 January 2007 he too was arrested while en route to Khuzdar to meet incarcerated party workers. Political cases under 16 M.P.O were registered against him and he was put under physical remand in Quetta for a month after which he was shifted to Khuzdar Jail where he was detained for four more months.

After being released, Mir Noor-ud-din Mengal began preparing to take part in the upcoming 2008 elections. He submitted his papers for the National Assembly Seat from Kalat but the All Parties Democratic Movement (APDM, an alliance of several political parties against General Musharaff's regime) announced to boycott the elections and since BNP was also a part of APDM, therefore all the BNP candidates withdrew their candidacy.

Akhtar Mengal was released in 2008 after a change of regime and went to Dubai for treatment of a disease he had contracted while in detention. So in his absence the party was being run by Habib Jalib Baloch, Dr Jahanzaib Jamaldini and Mir Noor-ud-din Mengal. In 2010 the BNP Leaders began receiving death threats and the threats were put into action for the first time when a BNP worker, Naseer Langove, was murdered in May 2010. A group named Baloch Musallah Difaee Tanzeem (Baloch Armed Defence Organization) claimed the responsibility for the murder and issued a statement claiming that their intended target had been Habib Jalib. On 14 July 2010 the shadow organization struck again, this time succeeding in assassinating Jalib in front of his house in Quetta. Only four days later another BNP Leader Haji Liaquat Mengal was assassinated near his house in Kalat.

== Assassination ==
After the death of Habib Jalib Mir Noor-ud-din Mengal was the man directing the affairs of Balochistan National Party in the absence of Akhtar Mengal and he was also one of the few top leaders of the party who wasn't keeping private security guards with him. On 13 October 2010 he had gone to the market in Kalat to get his Blood Pressure checked. As soon as he got back and turned his car into the gate of his house, unknown gunmen riding a motorcycle came up behind him and opened indiscriminate fire upon him. He was hit by three bullets; One in the neck and two in the back. He was immediately rushed to the local hospital but none of the doctors who were supposed to be on duty were there. Mengal was sent to Quetta without being given basic first aid. He died on the way to Quetta due to profuse bleeding. He had been conscious for nearly 75 minutes after being shot. As the news of his death spread in Balochistan, the traffic began thinning on the roads from the fear of riots erupting. Mengal was buried beside his father's grave in Kalat the same evening. Hundreds of people flocked to attend his funeral.

His death was assailed by all the local and national political parties such as the Pakistan National Party, the Awami National Party, Pakhtun-khwa Milli Awami Party, Balochistan National Party, Pakistan Muslim League Nawaz, Pakistan Muslim League Quaid-i Azam, the Baloch National Front, Jamiat Ulema-e-Islam and the Pakistan People's Party. On 14 and 15 October all the main cities of Balochistan remained closed to mourn Mengal's death. Strikes were also observed on the National Highway by BNP and BNF over Mir Noor-ud-din's assassination.

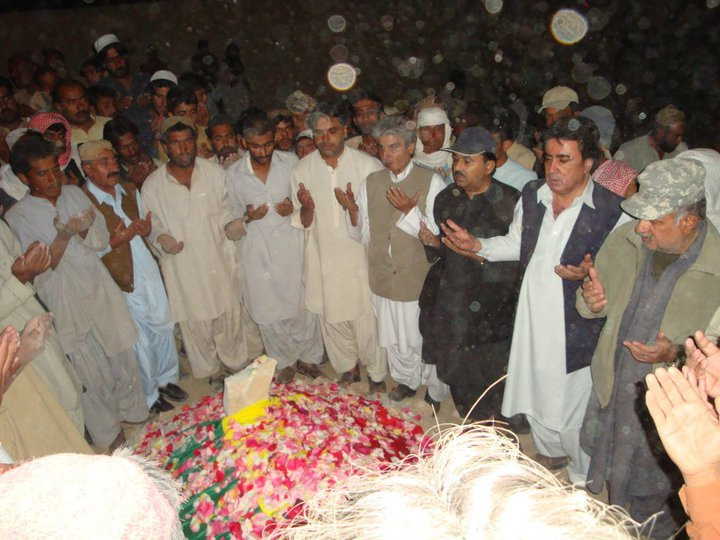
Mourners praying for Mir Nooruddin Mengal at his grave in Kalat.

== Legacy ==
After his death, a congregation was held to pay tribute to Mir Noor-ud-din by BNP where he was given the title "Shaheed i Watan" or "The Nation's Martyr".
