= Khan Amirzadah Khan =

- Born: Amirzadah; 15 November 1918; Bakhshali, Khyber Pakhtunkhwa
- Died: 13 September 1977 (aged 58); Mardan, Pakistan
- Education: LL.B
- Occupations: Lawyer and politician
- Writing career
- Notable awards: Khyber Pakhtunkhwa Provincial Minister For Law, Education and Parliamentary Affairs

Khan Amirzadah Khan (15 November 1918 – 13 September 1977) was a member of the Khudai Khidmatgar movement and a leader of the National Awami Party in Pakistan. Born in Bakhshali village, Mardan District in the province of Khyber Pakhtunkhwa (formerly known as North West Frontier Province), he was an active participant of Khudai Khidmatgar movement organized by Bacha Khan. Amirzada Khan started active politics with National Awami Party and remained President of National Awami Party District Mardan (now Mardan and Swabi) until 1972, when he remained senior Provincial Minister of Law, Education and Parliamentary Affairs.

== Early life and education ==
Khan was born on 15 November 1918 in the house of Khan Khoidad Khan. He received his early education from then Primary School Gujrat, Mardan District, a village adjacent to village Bakhshali. Later, he got his lower and high secondary school education from Government High School in Mardan. He topped the middle and matriculation examination from Board of Intermediate & Secondary Education Punjab. At the eve of the final day, Sikandar Mirza, the then-Deputy Commissioner of district Mardan, was the chief guest at the Annual Award Ceremony. Khan Amirzadah Khan being a top student both in academic and extra curricular activities and also won the declamation contest in the same function, the Chief Guest presented a 38 Bore Revolver to Amirzada Khan as a gift. At that time, only the people with great honor could carry a weapon and Khan Amirzadah Khan was bestowed with that honor.

After his graduation from University of Punjab, he went to Aligarh Muslim University for his higher studies. There, he received his law degree with distinction. On completion of his studies, he shifted to Karachi and started apprenticeship with renowned lawyer of the time A. K. Brohi. After completion of apprenticeship, he shifted back to Mardan and started his law practice.

== Political career ==
He was an active member of Khudai Khidmatgar since his student life. He started active politics from the same nationalist, secular and socialistic organization (which later became National Awami Party) and he remained President of National Awami Party District Mardan (now District Mardan & District Swabi) till 1972 when he became senior Minister of the province.

== Political and legal activities ==
In 1958, Abdul Ghaffar Khan was arrested. Although Khan Amirzadah Khan was a junior Lawyer but at that time nobody had the courage to confront the military regime. Khan Amirzadah Khan volunteered and advocated the case of Abdul Ghaffar Khan against the martial law regime of Ayub Khan.

The NAP, along with the Awami League expected to easily win the planned 1959 planned general elections. Its primary aim was the disbanding of the One Unit Scheme in West Pakistan and a fair deal for the increasingly discontented people of East Pakistan.

After the coup of Ayub Khan, political parties were banned and the NAP faced a harsh crackdown from the pro-USA government. The NAP was regarded by some as a front organization of the Communist Party of Pakistan. Hasan Nasir, the NAP office secretary, also a card-carrying member of the Communist Party, was tortured to death in custody. Mirza Mehdy Ispahani (a.k.a. Sadri Ispahani) was the treasurer of National Awami Party.

=== Election March 1964 general elections ===
In 1964 Ayub Khan conducted elections in Pakistan on the basis of his own hand-made rule known as Basic Democracy System in which there was no concept of one man, one vote. Only 85 Thousand People were eligible to vote in the then combined Pakistan, i.e. East Pakistan and West Pakistan. Ayub Khan was contesting the elections from the official/govt party named Convention Muslim League.

Elections were also scheduled for the National Assembly of Pakistan. In which the present district Mardan and district Swabi had a combined one Constituency. The Government Party selected the Nawab of Hoti, Nawabzada Abdul Ghafoor Khan Hoti as their candidate and The All Parties combined opposition selected Khan Amirzadah Khan to contest the election against the Nawabzada.

Nawabzada Abdul Ghafoor Khan Hoti being the Nawab of the area wished to be elected unopposed hence Khan Amirzadah Khan was pressured and influenced by all available means to withdraw in favor of Nawabzada Abdul Ghafoor Khan Hoti. Finally, he was offered a prime agricultural land of 2000 canals in Toot Kalli Area of Mardan nearby Khan Amirzadah Khan's village Bakhshali and a cash amount of Rupees Five Hundred Thousands was offered (at that time Gold was less than RS.100 a tola). But this man of honour refused to budge in spite of the fact that he knew very well that his chances of winning the election against Nawabzada Abdul Ghafoor Khan Hoti are minimal. Khan Amirzadah Khan lost the elections by a small margin but did not lose his self-esteem and self-respect which lead to his extreme popularity in the masses and then when in 1970 general elections, he contested for both National Assembly of Pakistan as well as Provincial Assembly of Khyber Pakhtunkhwa, he won both seats with overwhelming majority.

=== Period after 1964 elections ===
After the Elections, Khan Amirzadah Khan continued his law practice and almost 50 percent of his cases were against the government and advocated cases for the Political Workers of National Awami Party (NAP) and other opposition parties. He continued his political activities and used to be considered one of the most trusted person of Abdul Ghaffar Khan and Abdul Wali Khan, who always consulted Khan Amirzadah Khan in political as well as constitutional matters.

=== 1970 general elections ===
In 1967, after the fall of Field Martial Muhammad Ayub Khan there was a long spell of Political Activism and popular agitation, culminating in general elections of 1970. Abdul Ghaffar Khan, who at that time was in exile in Afghanistan, thought that the presence of Abdul Wali Khan, Khan Amirzadah Khan and Arbab Sikandar Khan Khalil is necessary in at least one of the Assemblies.

Hence Abdul Ghaffar Khan conveyed his desire to the Party that these 3 leaders of National Awami Party (NAP) shall contest the elections for both National Assembly as well as the Provincial Assembly of the then Khyber Pakhtunkhwa, which was willingly accepted by the party Parliamentary Board and these three leaders contested for both National Assembly of Pakistan as well as Provincial Assembly of Khyber Pakhtunkhwa.

Abdul Wali Khan and Khan Amirzadah Khan won both the assembly elections with overwhelming majority. Arbab Sikandar Khan Khalil won the Provincial Assembly seat.

The Awami League, led by Sheikh Mujibur Rahman, swept the elections in East Pakistan and overall, taking an overwhelming majority in combined Pakistan. Pakistan Peoples Party of Zulfikar Ali Bhutto swept in Punjab and Sindh. In Baluchistan and Khyber Pakhtunkhwa National Awami Party got the majority, but Chief Martial Law Administrator and the Establishment, (which was dominated by West Pakistan Particularly, the Punjab) refused to hand over the power to the largest winning Party that was Awami League.

The Awami League, which led to agitation in East Pakistan. The establishment decided to crush this popular agitation and a brutal ARMY action was started that resulted in the separation of East Pakistan which became an independent country (Bangladesh). Chief Martial Law Administrator General Yahya Khan quit the power in the remaining Pakistan and Mr. Zulfikar Ali Bhutto became the new chief martial law administrator (the first civilian chief martial law administrator in history) and later became the president of Pakistan.

=== National Awami Party and Pakistan Peoples Party accord ===
Abdul Wali Khan's negotiations with Zulfiqar Ali Bhutto led to the signing of an agreement with the government in 1972, called the Tripartite Agreement. The agreement led to the lifting of martial law and removal of the ban on the National Awami Party. This led to the formation of National Awami Party coalition provincial governments in the Khyber Pakhtunkhwa and Baluchistan. Despite the initial positive start, the agreement rapidly began to unravel due to the growing animosity between Abdul Wali Khan and Zulfikar Ali Bhutto. Pakistan Peoples Party of Mr.Zulfikar Ali Bhutto was the largest party in Sindh and Punjab but had no Member Baluchistan and only one National Assembly and three provincial assembly members in Khyber Pakhtunkhwa, in these two provinces National Awami Party of Abdul Wali Khan was the major party. PPP and NAP considered it a necessity to work together and run the bifurcated remaining Pakistan in a democratic manner.

There was a long period of parleys between the two parties, in which Khan Amirzadah Khan was the main negotiator from National Awami Party. Finally, an accord was reached with consensus. According to the accord the governors and the chief ministers of Sindh and Punjab was to be named by Pakistan Peoples Party as it was the largest party while the governor of Khyber Pakhtunkhwa and Balochistan to be the nominees of National Awami Party and the chief ministers of these provinces were to be nominees of National Awami Party and Jamiat UL Islam of Molana Mufti Mehmood.

Accordingly, the Federal and Provincial Governments were installed as per the negotiated formula. Khan Amirzadah Khan was nominated as senior minister with portfolios of Education, Law and Parliamentary Affairs.

The system was running very well and quiet smoothly but the nature of Zulfikar Ali Bhutto was that he always wanted absolute authority and could not he could not tolerate the authority in Khyber Pakhtunkhwa and Balochistan remains with others. In ten months, he sabotaged his own accord and dismissed the governors of Balochistan and Khyber Pakhtunkhwa. The democratically elected government of Balochistan was dismissed. As a protest the government of Khyber Pakhtunkhwa resigned en masse.

March 1973, the leadership of National Awami Party and workers were arrested on various pretexts. Khan Amirzadah Khan started a long legal battle. He was released by the courts, but rearrested by the Bhutto government. Khan Amirzadah Khan was also arrested, along with other National Awami Party leaders and charged with the murder of Hayat Khan Sherpao.

=== Constitutional Committee ===
Pakistan ran under the remnant of Martial Law LFO (Legal Framework Order) without any proper constitution. It was obligatory on the Legislature to frame a new constitution for a country, so it appointed a 25-member Constitutional committee composed of all the political parties represented in the parliament according to their strength on 17 April 1972, to prepare a draft of the permanent Constitution of Pakistan.

Khan Amirzadah Khan and Mir Ghous Bux Bizenjo were representing National Awami Party. This Constitutional Committee headed Abdul Hafiz Pirzada of Pakistan Peoples Party work day and night for many months and framed a draft constitution which was presented in the parliament on 14 August 1973 and adopted as the well known 1973 constitution. Khan Amirzadah Khan deliberated and delivered his famous speech of 5 hours and 35 minutes on this constitution (this speech is still holding the record of the longest extempore speech of the National Assembly).

According to this constitution no person could hold membership of more than 1 Assembly at a time. Hence, Abdul Wali Khan resigned from the membership of Khyber Pakhtunkhwa assembly and retained the seat of National Assembly of Pakistan. On the advice of the party leadership Khan Amirzadah Khan resigned from the National Assembly and retained the membership of Khyber Pakhtunkhwa assembly seat. Where Khan Amirzadah Khan was elected as leader of the opposition which he retained till the end of the tenure of the assembly.

=== Ban on National Awami Party and birth of National Democratic Alliance ===
Abdul Wali Khan, was the leader of the combined opposition in the National Assembly of Pakistan. He and his other followers and leaders of National Awami Party were steadfast against the dictatorial and undemocratic regime of Zulfikar Ali Bhutto. Zulfikar Ali Bhutto tried but failed to break or purchase the loyalties of the parliamentarian of National Awami Party. He in a fit of anger and revenge decided to order on 8 February 1975, a ban on the National Awami Party under the "Political Parties Act, 1962" of the constitution. All the National Awami Party leadership was put behind the bars. Khan Amirzadah Khan was also arrested but was released by court of law. On the instruction of the party high hierarchy Khan Amirzadah Khan along with Nasim Wali Khan started deliberations and finally persuaded a Baloch Nationalist leader Mr. Sherbaz Mazari and a new party with the name of National Democratic Alliance was launched.

Mr. Sherbaz Khan Mazari was elected its central president and the members of the National Assembly and Provincial Assemblies affiliated with National Awami Party join this new party.which was considered as a brain child of Khan Amirzadah Khan and a better substitute for the National Awami Party, (NAP)

=== 1973 presidential election ===
In 1973, after the implementation of the new constitution, the elections for the president of Pakistan were held. Pakistan People Party which was in government, nominated Fazal Elahi Chaudhry while Amirzada Khan of National Awami Party was the unanimous candidate of all the combined opposition parties. Chaudhry received 139 votes against 45 of Khan's, and was thus elected president.

=== Assassination of Hayat Khan Sherpao ===
In 1974, after Zulfiqar Ali Bhutto's close ally and governor of the Khyber Pakhtunkhwa province Hayat Sherpao was killed in a bomb blast at Peshawar University. Zulfikar Ali Bhutto became convinced that Abdul Wali Khan, Amirzada Khan and the National Awami Party.

On 8 February 1975, whilst addressing the students, Hayat Mohammed Khan Sherpao, senior minister of the Khyber Pakhtunkhwa and president of the provincial PPP, was blown up by a bomb and killed. Another Prime Minister Bhutto, Zulfikar that time, stopped doing what he was doing in New York City that day, boarded the plane, flew back, and wept at Sherpao's grave.

The very next day, on 9 February, the leaders of the opposition NAP in various parts of the country were arrested. These included Wali Khan, Arbab Sikander, Syed Muhammad Kaswar Gardezi, Mehroz Akhtar, Arbab Saifur Rahman, Major General Jilani (Jil of Narowal), Khan Amirzadah Khan, Haji Ghulam Ahmed Bilour, Mohammed Adil, Rukhnuddin Kazmi, Hassan Hameedi, Rehmatullah Khan Rohaila, Abdul Khaliq Khan (Roedads brother, the best of the lot). They were held under the Maintenance of Public Order (MPO) ordinance and various other false charges.

Barrister Azizullah Shaikh, chief of the National Awami Party in Karachi, who was in Hyderabad, managed to remain out of reach. His home, with his wife and three small daughters, was surrounded by agency men, it was pelted with stones, and the children terrorised. Friend moved Sardar Sherbaz Mazari in with his own armed bodyguards and stayed overnight to protect Azizullahs family.

On 10 February, the government of Pakistan dissolved the National Awami Party and forfeited all the properties and funds of the Party. The action, according to Gazette of Pakistan notifications, has been taken under Sub-section 1 of Section VI of the Political Parties Act of 1962. The notifications said that the government was satisfied that the National Awami Party was operating in a manner prejudicial to the sovereignty and integrity of Pakistan and it had, therefore, formally declared the National Awami Party to be operating in such a manner. Following the government order, all the offices of the Party throughout the country have been sealed. (Dawn 11 February 1975).

The movement of scores of other office-bearers of the NAP in various centres of the country were restricted under the dreaded MPO. On the same day government agents raided and ransacked the offices of Asghar Khan's Newspaper Daily Tehrik-i-Istiqlal and of the Jamaat. The office of the defunct daily newspaper Shahbaz was set afire.

On 14 February, the champion of liberty, Minister for Provincial Co- ordination Hafiz Pirzada declared that the administrative action taken by the government in dissolving the National Awami Party was not arbitrary or out of rancour and acrimony it was strictly in conformity with the provisions of the Constitution.

I now quote from Bhuttos biographer, Stanley Wolpert, the first man allowed access to the archives of the great leader at 70 Clifton. He had no doubt, moreover, as to the identity of the murderers, though no party or individual would ever claim credit for killing Sherpao. Zulfi felt as certain that Abdul Wali Khan was the man responsible for Hayat Khan Sherpao's death as Ahmed Raza was certain about who killed his father.

=== Government charges and rebuttal ===
The National Awami Party the government used extensive means to validate the charges leveled against National Awami Party, while no proof was ever shown of the Party or its leaders role in the murder of Hayat Khan Sherpao, a strong state run media smear campaign was launched which attributed any argument for the acquittal or release of the National Awami Party leaders as anti-Pakistani.

In addition, Prime Minister Bhutto warned the judges that the "responsibility of the consequence will be of the Supreme Court" should they reject his reference against NAP.

=== Arrest and Hyderabad High Treason and Conspiracy Tribunal ===
The Hyderabad Tribunal (1975–1979), also known as Hyderabad conspiracy case, is the name of a former judicial tribunal used in Pakistan to prosecute opposition politicians of the National Awami Party on the charges of treason and acting against the ideology of Pakistan.

When Zulfikar Ali Bhutto failed absolutely to break the leadership of National Awami Party. All the prominent leaders of this party were arrested in a fake case of High treason and conspiracy to break Pakistan. A total of 52 people were arrested. Those arrested from the National Awami Party leadership included Abdul Wali Khan, Khan Amirzadah Khan, Ghaus Bakhsh Bizenjo, Nawab Khair Bakhsh Marri, Syed Muhammad Kaswar Gardezi, Mir Gul Khan Nasir, Sardar Ataullah Mengal, Habib Jalib, Barrister Azizullah Shaikh, Aslam She-sani(Aslam Baluch), Aslam Kurd, Saleem Kurd, Sher Mohammad Marri Karnel Sultan Mengal and several other patriots. In addition, several members of the Muslim League and even prominent critics of Bhutto within his own Pakistan Peoples Party were also arrested.

The Peshawar University, to that fateful Saturday, 8 February 1975. Whilst addressing the students, Hayat Mohammed Khan Sherpao, senior minister of the Khyber Pakhtunkhwa and president of the provincial PPP, was blown up by a bomb and killed. Another Prime Minister Bhutto, Zulfikar that time, stopped doing what he was doing in New York that day, boarded the plane, flew back, and wept at Sherpaos grave.

The very next day, on 9 February, the leaders of the opposition National Awami Party in various parts of the country were arrested. These included Abdul Wali Khan, Arbab Sikandar Khan Khalil, Syed Muhammad Kaswar Gardezi, Mehroz Akhtar, Arbab Saifur Rahman, Major General Jilani (Jil of Narowal), Khan Amirzada Khan, Ghulam Ahmed Bilour, Mohammad Adil, Rukhnuddin Kazmi, Hassan Hameedi, Rehmatullah Khan Rohaila, Abdul Khaliq Khan (Roedads brother, the best of the lot). They were held under the Maintenance of Public Order (MPO) ordinance and various other false charges.

Barrister Azizullah Shaikh, chief of the National Awami Party in Karachi, who was in Hyderabad, managed to remain out of reach. His home, with his wife and three small daughters, was surrounded by agency men, it was pelted with stones, and the children terrorised. Friend Sardar Sherbaz Mazari moved in with his own armed bodyguards and stayed overnight to protect Azizullahs family.

On 10 February, the government of Pakistan dissolved the National Awami Party and forfeited all the properties and funds of the Party. The action, according to Gazette of Pakistan notifications, has been taken under Sub-section 1 of Section VI of the Political Parties Act of 1962. The notifications said that the government was satisfied that the National Awami Party was operating in a manner prejudicial to the sovereignty and integrity of Pakistan and it had, therefore, formally declared the National Awami Party to be operating in such a manner. Following the government order, all the offices of the Party throughout the country have been sealed.

The movement of scores of other office-bearers of the National Awami Party in various centres of the country were restricted under the dreaded MPO. On the same day government agents raided and ransacked the offices of Asghar Khans Tehrik-i-Istiqlal and of the Jamaat. The office of the defunct daily newspaper Shahbaz was set afire.

On 14 February, the champion of liberty, Minister for Provincial co-ordination Abdul Hafiz Pirzada declared that the administrative action taken by the government in dissolving the National Awami Party was not arbitrary or out of rancour and acrimony it was strictly in conformity with the provisions of the Constitution.

I now quote from Bhuttos biographer, Stanley Wolpert, the first man allowed access to the archives of the great leader at 70 Clifton. He had no doubt, moreover, as to the identity of the murderers, though no party or individual would ever claim credit for killing Sherpao. Zulfi felt as certain that Abdul Wali Khan was the man responsible for Sherpao's death as Ahmed Raza was certain about who killed his father.

A special tribunal was set up on the orders of Pakistani prime minister Zulfikar Ali Bhutto in Central Jail of Hyderabad (Sindh).The National Awami Party, which the government banned on 10 February 1975. Khan Amirzadah Khan in spite of enduring the hardships of the prison was advocating the case of National Awami Party's leadership.

In this Tribunal due to his very hard work and struggles his health deteriorated he developed 'diabetes' and later hard multiple heart attacks in the prison and was finally bailed out on medical grounds for better medical treatment.

=== 1977 general elections ===
When 1977 general elections were announced, the party asked Khan Amirzadah Khan to contest the elections. He, in spite of poor health, contested them for the Provincial Assembly of Khyber Pakhtunkhwa. Claims of widespread rigging by Zulfikar Ali Bhutto in the elections for the National Assembly of Pakistan eventually surfaced. In protest, the combined opposition decided to boycott the elections for Provincial Assembly of Khyber Pakhtunkhwa and Balochistan to be held three days later.

The opposition parties banded together to form Pakistan National Alliance, and the countrywide spontaneous agitation erupted soon afterwards.

=== Legal justification ===
The 3rd amendment to the Constitution of Pakistan was passed which gave wide legal scope to the state to define anti-state activities.

Amendment of Article 10 of the Constitution.

In the Constitution of the Islamic Republic of Pakistan, hereinafter referred to as the Constitution, in Article 10,— In clause (7), in the proviso, after the word "enemy", the commas and words ", or who is acting or attempting to act in a manner prejudicial to the integrity, security of defense of Pakistan or any part thereof or who commits or attempt to commit any act which amounts to an anti-national activity as defined in a Federal Law or is a member of any association which has for its object, or which indulges him, any such anti-national activity" shall be added.
