= Arbab Sikandar Khan =

Pakistani politician

Arbab Sikandar Khan Khalil

9th Governor of North-West Frontier Province
- In office 29 April 1972 – 14 February 1973
- President: Zulfikar Ali Bhutto
- Preceded by: Hayat Mohammad Khan Sherpao
- Succeeded by: Muhammad Aslam Khan Khattak

Arbab Sikandar Khan Khalil (Urdu: ارباب سکندر خان خلیل) (1911–1982) was a Governor of the Khyber-Pakhtunkhwa province of Pakistan. He was a senior leader in the National Awami Party, which won the 1970 elections in Khyber-Pakhtunkhwa and Balochistan and later formed the provincial governments. He was dismissed as Governor in 1973 and subsequently arrested as part of the Hyderabad tribunal. He was released in 1979 and was assassinated on 7 March 1982.

== Early life ==
Arbab Sikandar Khan Khalil was born in 1913. His father was Arbab Saadat Ali Khan, a Red Shirt leader. He was arrested in connection to Qissa Khwani Bazaar massacre in 1930 and died in 1932 in Hari Pur Prison. Arbab Sikandar was then imprisoned twice, at the age of 19 years within the same year of his father’s death.

He received his early education from Islamia College, Peshawar and an LLB degree from Aligarh Muslim University in 1947. Arbab started his practice as a lawyer immediately after the partition. In post-partition events, the office of a renowned Hindu legal professional Mela Ram Advocate was allotted to him by the evacuee trust.

== Family ==
Arbab Sikandar Khan Khalil belonged to the Arbab family of Peshawar, which has produced many leading politicians. His father Arbab Saadat Ali Khan was a Red Shirt leader, who was arrested in connection to Qissa Khwani Bazaar massacre in 1930 and died in 1932 in Hari Pur Prison.

Arbab Sikandar belonged to the Tehkal tehsil in Peshawar, where the Khalil Arbabs are dominant.

== Political career ==
Arbab started his political career under the mentorship of his cousin Arbab Abdul Ghafoor Khan. Differences between the Arbab family and the Khudai Khidmatgaar movement arose and resultantly the Arbab family left the movement to join the Muslim League. Hence, Arbab Sikandar, who was initially a member of the Congress, later joined the Muslim League. Another major reason for joining the Muslim League was that Arbab Sikandar and his cousin, after the 1940’s Pakistan Resolution in Lahore, supported the idea of partition.

In 1956, he joined the Awami League, and then the National Awami Party. He spent 4 months imprisoned during General Ayub Khan's regime. In December 1970, he joined the Provincial Assembly of NWFP, shortly after which he was selected as the Governor of the Province.

== Governorship ==
Political offices
Preceded by Hayat Sherpao	Governor of Khyber-Pakhtunkhwa; 1972–1973	Succeeded by Muhammad Aslam Khan Khattak

Arbab Sikandar Khan Khalil remained as the ninth governor of the NWFP province during the early '70s. This was under the NAP-JUI coalition with the Pakistan People's Party.

In his letter to Arbab Sikandar, the then-President of Pakistan Zulfikar Ali Bhutto spelled out the terms for the coalition, such as ensuring the equal treatment of all inhabitants in the province, taking steps that fell within the constitutional jurisdiction of the central government, and not complicating foreign relations due to any adverse actions. He went on to say that every effort should be made to preserve the national integrity. The Governor was instructed to firmly put down movements like the "so-called azad (free) Pakhtoonistan movement". A similar letter had been penned to Mr. Ghaush Baksh Bizenjo, the Governor of Balochistan under the same NAP-JUI coalition. The terms were accepted by both Governors, as the letters released in Rawalpindi showed.

Arbab Sikandar was part of the NAP constitution committee which included many other prominent lawyers and politicians. Arbab directed the committee on political matters.

On 24 December 1972, after an 8-year exile, Abdul Ghaffar Khan returned to the Frontier. President Bhutto had not wanted him back but Arbab Sikandar was insistent on the return of the one who was "the Frontier's best-loved figure".

He ordered a water supply scheme for southern districts, ensured regular supply of food and common use items to Chitral district and started projects on roads, and small dams in northern areas of the province. Arbab also played an important role in finalising the Simla Agreement between India and Pakistan, and as a result almost 90,000 prisoners of war were released by India and 36000 were released by Pakistan.

Arbab Sikandar was said to allow ordinary people to visit the Governor's House KP, a decision seldom taken by most other Governors of Pakistan.

He was dismissed from this post by the Federal government in 1973. Arbab was imprisoned in connection to the Hyderabad Conspiracy.

== Beliefs ==
On 12 March 1979, Arbab Sikandar Khan Khalil at Sherbaz Mazari's residence in Karachi, told DAWN newspaper's reporters that the people of Pakistan would never tolerate superpowers hegemony. "We will never allow our country to become another Vietnam", said he.

"The Pakistan of Jinnah is reduced to the Pakistan of Punjab," were the remarks of Arbab Sahib after the partition of Pakistan. He had made numerous efforts to find a settlement between West and East Pakistan during rising tensions, and travelled several times to East Pakistan to meet Sheikh Mujeeb. He vigorously fought for unification of Princely states of Dir, Chitral and Swat into NWFP, and actively participated in the amalgamation process of the aforementioned princely states. He was also a stern critic of the One-Unit Scheme and demanded the restoration of the four provinces of Pakistan.

Arbab Sikandar authored six books, three out of which were on philosophy. "Zara Falsafa (Conventional Philosophy)", "Nawey Falsafa (Modern Philosophical Thought)", "Zhawar Fiqroona (Deep Thoughts)", "Guloona ao Azghi (Flowers and Thorns)" and "Da Eqtisadiato Khulase (Summary of Economic thoughts)" in Pashto language. His unpublished book "The Other Side of the Picture" in English, provides a critical analysis of the Pakistan Movement, its leadership and the subsequent development in Pakistan till 1977.

== Death ==
On 7 March 1982, a man called Muhammad Tahir shot Arbab Sikandar Khan Khalil while he was on his routine walk in the fields of his village Tehkal Bala. His killing was said to not have been a result of any family or personal enmity, but rather religious reasons. According to the killer, he had once invited Arbab on a religious Tabligh but he had rejected the invite, telling Muhammad Tahir to "focus on mending his own ways before telling others how to". This offended Muhammad Tahir, who consequently shot Arbab who was 70 years old.

A week after the murder of Arbab Sikandar Khan Khalil, a demonstration was planned by the banned National Democratic Party (NDP) to mourn the death. It was the first major street demonstration since Pakistan's military rulers banned political meetings more than 2 years ago. Around 200 people attended the rally. The Peshawar police made 55 arrests and used tear gas to break it up. Among the arrested were 10 politicians, including Abdul Wali Khan and retired Major-General Nasirullah Babar. Arbab Sikandar's brother was among those held too. The NDP described the killing as a "a political murder by Right-wing religious fanatics".

President Mohammad Zia-ul-Haq's cabinet at a meeting in Rawalpindi on 13 March condemned the killing and promised exemplary punishment for those responsible. In the year of his martyrdom, the Human Rights Society of Pakistan awarded a Peace Prize to Arbab Sikandar.

In 2012, Chief Minister Khyber Pakhtunkhwa, Ameer Haider Khan Hoti inaugurated Arbab Sikandar Khan Khalil Shaheed flyover at GT Road on Pakistan's 66th Independence Day. Senior Provincial Minister, Bashir Ahmed Bilour, Provincial ministers, Mian Iftikhar Hussain, Syed Zahir Ali Shah, MPAs, Chief Secretary, IGP, Director PDA and officials concerned were also present on the occasion. The bridge was completed in a period of 14 months with financial implications of Rs 870 million. The bridge named in the memory of the senior party leader, late Arbab Sikandar serves to enhance the existing transportation facilities by sharing the load of traffic on busy GT Road

https://amntv.org/mian-iftikhar-hussain-new-speech-ex-governor-arbab-sikandar-khan-khalil-death-anniversary/
