= Hyderabad tribunal =

Former Pakistani court for the prosecution of opposition politicians (1975–79)

The Hyderabad tribunal (1975–1979), also known as Hyderabad conspiracy case, is the name of a former judicial tribunal used in Pakistan to prosecute opposition politicians of the National Awami Party on the charges of treason and acting against the ideology of Pakistan.

The tribunal was set up on the orders of Pakistani Prime Minister Zulfikar Ali Bhutto. The National Awami Party, which the government banned on 10 February 1975. The Supreme Court of Pakistan, on 30 October 1975, held that the party was working for an independent Pakhtunistan and greater Balochistan at the cost of Pakistan's territorial integrity. It was ultimately wound up after General Zia-ul Haq overthrew Bhutto in 1977.

A total of 52 people were arrested. Those arrested from the National Awami Party leadership included Khan Abdul Wali Khan, Khan Amirzadah Khan, Syed Muhammad Kaswar Gardezi, Ghaus Bakhsh Bizenjo, Nawab Khair Bakhsh Marri, Mir Gul Khan Nasir, Sardar Ataullah Mengal, Habib Jalib, Barrister Azizullah Shaikh, Aslam Baluch (Shaysani), Aslam Kurd, Saleem Kurd, Sher Mohammad Marri (General Sherof), Najam Sethi, Saleem Pervez, Majid Gichki, Mir Abdul Wahid Kurd (read article) and Karnel Sultan Mengal. In addition, several members of the Muslim League and even prominent critics of Bhutto within his own Pakistan Peoples Party were also arrested.

== Legal justification ==
The 3rd amendment to the Constitution of Pakistan was passed which gave wide legal scope to the state to define anti-state activities.

In the Constitution of the Islamic Republic of Pakistan, in Article 10, in clause (7), in the proviso, after the word "enemy", the commas and words “, or who is acting or attempting to act in a manner prejudicial to the integrity, security of defense of Pakistan or any part thereof or who commits or attempt to commit any act which amounts to an anti-national activity as defined in a Federal Law or is a member of any association which has for its object, or which indulges him, any such anti-national activity" shall be added.

=== The London Plan ===
The alleged pretext for the banning was one of several incidents, it is alleged that Nawab Akbar Bugti on 31 January 1973, claimed at a public meeting at Mochi Gate, Lahore, that Wali Khan and Ataullah Mengal shared with him the "Independent Balochistan Plan", through which Balochistan could be placed "under the heel of one or more foreign power". He also reportedly claimed that the foreign headquarters supporting the "Greater Balochistan Plan" were located in Baghdad.

This plus alleged evidence obtained from the Iraq Embassy was used as a pretext for the dismissal of the provincial government of Sardar Attaullah Mengal and the subsequent military intervention in Balochistan.

=== Assassination of Hayat Sherpao ===
In 1974, after Zulfiqar Ali Bhutto's close ally and governor of the North-West Frontier Province Hayat Sherpao was killed in a bomb blast at Peshawar university. Bhutto became convinced that Khan Abdul Wali Khan and the National Awami Party were responsible.

== Trial ==
The Tribunal was headed initially by Justice Aslam Riaz Hussain and subsequently by Justice Mushtak Ali Kazi, while the government was represented by Attorney General Yahya Bakhtiar, the defence counsel consisted of noted lawyers Mahmud Ali Kasuri and Abid Hassan Minto. As the trial went on NAP leader Khan Wali Khan withdrew from any defense arguing that the tribunal included biased judges and that a decision to convict had already been made. The hearings of the trial are now considered widely discredited for their one sidedness.

In response to one of the charges before the Hyderabad Tribunal, that he had been sent Rs 20 million by Indian Prime Minister Indira Gandhi through a certain emissary, Wali Khan sarcastically filed a civil suit against the emissary for the recovery of the Rs 20 million. He argued that, although he could not imagine why Indira Gandhi would send him such a large sum of money, he had never received the money, and obviously the emissary had embezzled the money.

== Government charges & rebuttal ==
The government used extensive means to validate the charges levelled against the NAP, while no proof was ever shown of the Party or its leaders role in the murder of Sherpao, a strong state run media smear campaign was launched which attributed any argument for the acquittal or release of the NAP leaders as anti-Pakistani.

In addition, Prime Minister Bhutto warned the judges that the "responsibility of the consequence will be of the Supreme Court" should they reject his reference against NAP.

== Conspiracy ==
It is often referred to by leftists and progressives as a conspiracy by rightists elements to force a confrontation between the two leftists parties Pakistan People's Party and National Awami Party. This event was to force the latter towards striking an alliance in the Pakistan National Alliance and increase Bhutto's reliance on the Armed forces. It is alleged that the Interior Minister (1973–1977) Abdul Qayyum Khan played a key role in triggering Bhutto's confrontation with the Baloch nationalists.
