= National Awami Party (Wali) =

Pakistani political party

National Awami Party (Wali) نیشنل عوامی پارٹی (ولي)
- Abbreviation: NAP(W)
- President: Abdul Wali Khan
- General Secretary: Syed Muhammad Kaswar Gardezi; Mahmudul Huq Usmani
- Vice President: Dabiruddin Ahmed; Amir Hussein Shah
- Joint Secretary: Dewan Mahboob Ali; Ajmal Khattak
- Founder: Abdul Wali Khan
- Founded: November 30, 1967
- Dissolved: 1986
- Split from: NAP
- Succeeded by: ANP; MKP; PNP; NAP(M)
- Student wing: NSF
- Ideology: Communism; Democratic socialism Federalism; Left-wing populism Liberal socialism Marxism-Leninism-Maoism; Progressivism; Regionalism; Revolutionary socialism Secularism; Social democracy Social egalitarianism
- Political position: Left-wing
- Colors: Red

Election symbol
- Hut

Party flag

The Wali Khan faction of the National Awami Party was formed after the 1967 split in the original NAP between Maulana Bhashani and Abdul Wali Khan. The Wali Khan faction was later named the National Awami Party (NAP) after the independence of Bangladesh (former East Pakistan).

The NAP was banned twice during its eight-year-long existence, the first time under the Yahya Khans government in 1971 and the second time in 1975 by Zulfiqar Ali Bhutto's government. It was then resurrected under the name National Democratic Party, from which in turn was formed the Awami National Party.

The Party represented left wing views in Pakistan and its core politics was based on the disbanding of the One Unit, restoration of the adult franchise (1967–1970), land reforms, protection of tenants' rights, redistribution of wealth through nationalisation, Pakistan becoming a confederacy as well as the holding of fair elections, protection of an independent judiciary and freedom of the press. It contested the 1970 election, winning the second largest number of seats in Khyber Pakhtunkhwa, the largest in Baluchistan, and a handful of seats in East Pakistan's provincial assembly. It failed to win any seats in Punjab and Sindh.

After the division of Pakistan in 1971, NAP formed coalition governments in the Khyber-Pakhtunkhwa and Balochistan on the basis of winning majority of seats in the two provinces. Arbab Sikandar Khan was appointed Governor of the Khyber Pakhtunkhwa and Ghaus Bux Bizenjo Governor of Balochistan. Sardar Ataullah Mengal was elected the first Chief Minister of Balochistan and the NAP supported Mufti Mahmud of the JUI as Chief Minister of the Khyber Pakhtunkhwa. The party was disbanded in 1975 amidst a government crackdown. It was resurrected in 1976 under the National Democratic Party under Sherbaz Mazari but split in 1979 following disagreements amongst the left wing of the party against the leadership. A brief attempt was made to resurrect the Party by Ajmal Khattak under the name National Awami Party of Pakistan in 2000, however the party was routed in the 2002 election and much of its leadership merged back with the ANP.

== Party formation ==
On 30 November 1967, the NAP split between Maulana Bhashani and Abdul Wali Khan, ostensibly because Bhashani sided with China while Professor Muzaffar Ahmed, along with Abdul Wali Khan, sided with the USSR in the Sino-Soviet split.

Following the split, the leftist members of the NAP, many of whom were active in a Kissan (peasant) Committee, decided to follow the Wali Khan faction. Soon after, the leadership of the Wali Khan faction, being landlords, decided not to allow members of the NAP to also be members of the Kissan Committee. The leftists, led by Afzal Bangash and Sher Ali Bacha, then decided to leave the NAP and establish the Mazdoor Kisan Party (MKP).

The NAP party leadership struggling with a rivalry between Mahmud Ali Kasuri and Mahmudul Haq Usmani for the Presidency. Ultimately the leadership backed Abdul Wali Khan as a compromise candidate. The National Council of the Party met on 30 June and 1 July 1968 at Royal Hotel, Peshawar, with Professor Muzaffar Ahmed, President of East Pakistan NAP chairing the first session. Abdul Wali Khan was unanimously elected as President of the party.

=== Office bearers ===
Name	Office
Abdul Wali Khan	President
Dabiruddin Ahmed	Vice President
Amir Hussein Shah	Vice President
Syed Muhammad Kaswar Gardezi	General Secretary
Mahmudul Huq Usmani	General Secretary
Dewan Mahboob Ali	Joint Secretary
Ajmal Khattak	Joint Secretary
Mohiuddin Ahmed	Treasurer
Khan Amirzadah Khan	Senior Leader

== Political ideology ==
The National Awami Party was a socialist political party that advocated greater provincial autonomy and the Theory of Four Nationalities. The theory advocated by senior NAP leader Bizenjo stated Pakistan was composed of four distinct "nations", the Pukhtun, Baloch, Sindhi and Western Punjabi.

== 1970 elections and aftermath ==
The party contested the 1970 elections from Khyber-Pakhtunkhwa (K-P), Balochistan, Sindh and East Pakistan. It did not field any candidates in the Punjab, Nationally it fielded 16 candidates from K-P, three of whom got elected, securing 18.4% of the vote, in Balochistan three out of four candidates were elected but it failed to win any seats from Sindh.

In 1971, in an attempt to avert a possible showdown between the Military and the people of East Pakistan, on March 23, 1971, Khan, along with other Pakistani politicians, jointly met Sheikh Mujibur Rahman. They offered support to Mujeeb in the formation of a government, but it was already too late to break the impasse as Yahya Khan had already decided on a full scale military crackdown. Pakistan's increasing vulnerability and widespread international outrage against the military crackdown eventually created a situation that led to war between Pakistan and India. This war proved disastrous and culminated in Pakistan's armed forces being defeated in East Pakistan and the creation of the new state of Bangladesh. Shocked by the defeat, Yahya Khan resigned from office and the military. Under General Gul Hassan Khan, Zulfikar Ali Bhutto was brought back from America and appointed President.

During the martial law crackdown against East Pakistan, the National Awami Party under Wali Khan was one of a handful of parties that protested the military operation. In one case, Khan helped a senior East Pakistani diplomat's son escape to Afghanistan from possible internment in West Pakistan. The military government, in retaliation against the protests, banned the party and launched mass arrests of party activists.

=== Tripartite Agreement ===
In 1972, as the opposition leader, Wali Khan was contacted by Zulfikar Ali Bhutto, who wanted to lift martial law and set up a new constitution. Wali Khan's negotiations with Zulfiqar Ali Bhutto led to the NAP signing of an agreement with the government in 1972, called the Tripartite Agreement. The agreement led to the lifting of martial law and removal of the ban on the National Awami Party. This led to the formation of National Awami Party coalition provincial governments in the North-West Frontier Province and Baluchistan. Despite the initial positive start, the agreement rapidly began to unravel due to the growing animosity between Khan and Bhutto.

=== National Opposition Party ===
In 1972, Wali Khan was elected as Parliamentary leader of the opposition, the NAP made several initiatives to broaden its support across the country. It dropped its demand to rename the then North-West Frontier Province (NWFP) as Pakhtunistan, declared Urdu as the provincial language of Khyber Pakhtunkhwa and Balochistan and espoused federalism with greater autonomy for the provinces. Senior party leader Ghaus Bux Bizenjo advocated that Pakistan consisted of four nationalities and their empowerment equally would prevent the breakup of Pakistan.

== Peasant attacks ==
The party's provincial governments faced attacks from leftists and Maoists who advocated armed conflict to take land from landlords and feudals. These attacks were allegedly on the behest of leftists within the Pakistan People's Party.

== Liaqat Bagh massacre ==
On March 23, 1973, the Federal Security Force, a paramilitary force under the alleged orders of Bhutto, attacked a public opposition rally at the Liaquat Bagh in the town of Rawalpindi and killed a dozen people; many more were wounded by their automatic gunfire. Wali Khan narrowly escaped a bullet during the attack. Public anger amongst ethnic Pashtuns ran high, as almost all the dead and most of the wounded were from the Khyber Pakhtunkhwa and were mostly members of the National Awami Party. The enraged party workers and followers wanted to parade the dead bodies on the streets in Peshawar and other cities of the province, and provoke a full scale confrontation. Wali Khan rejected this notion and held back his infuriated party cadres, escorting the dead bodies to Peshawar; he had them buried quietly with their bereaved families.

Following the massacre the Federal Security Force launched a crackdown against the party that led to many senior leaders including Ajmal Khattak to flee into exile to Kabul.

== Balochistan crisis ==
The Balochistan government immediately faced multiple crisis the first of which was when the Balochistan police department, mostly officered by people from Punjab or Khyber Pukhtunkhwa. As there was a provision that employees in the federating provinces would return to their province of origin after the dissolution of the One Unit. Most of the officers insisted on leaving. Despite this fact, Sardar Ataullah Mengal as chief minister, moved a resolution in the Balochistan Assembly to do away with the domicile as a qualification and suggested that those who had spent several generations in the province should be treated as locals. It was later on alleged that the officers were incited to leave through the efforts of PPP supporters and the then Chief Minister of Punjab Ghulam Mustafa Khar.

Unable to exercise any effective authority Ataullah Mengal turned to the Baloch Student Organization to assist in security.

The policing crisis also gave way to a subsequent intra-tribal conflict. The Baloch nationalists declared that it was fomented by the then Interior Minister Abdul Qayyum Khan but without evidence to prove the statements issued.

== London conspiracy ==
However, the final straw was the discovery of arms in the Iraqi embassy in Islamabad and Nawab Akbar Bugti's declaration of the London Plan, that alleged that NAP-led governments in Balochistan and Khyber Pakhtunkhwa was seceding to gain independence from Pakistan. Hence, Zulfikar Ali Bhutto's government, fresh from the humiliation of 1971 Bangladesh Liberation War used the pretext of arms shipment from Iraq to dismember Pakistan and dismissed the Balochistan provincial government in 1973, in protest against the decision the Khyber-Pakhtunkhwa government resigned in protest. Ataullah Mengal and his colleagues, including Ghaus Bux Bizenjo and Khair Bakhsh Marri were arrested along with other NAP leaders.

== Hyderabad tribunal ==
In the face of an increasingly strong national campaign led by the NAP against the government, Bhutto banned NAP on February 8, 1975 after the murder of his close colleague Hayat Khan Sherpao, throwing thousands of its workers and much of its leadership, including party president Abdul Wali Khan, in jail for alleged anti-state activities.

Invoking the 1st amendment of the 1973 constitution the government charged Wali Khan and his colleagues under the Hyderabad Conspiracy Case in 1976, although they were acquitted of the charge of the murder of PPP stalwart Hayat Khan Sherpao, the decision to ban the NAP was upheld by the courts. In addition to Abdul Wali Khan, the case also implicated two governors, two chief ministers, scores of national and provincial parliamentarians, Khan Amirzadah Khan, Syed Kaswar Gardezi, Habib Jalib (Urdu revolutionary poet) and Mir Gul Khan Nasir (Balochi Revolutionary Poet/Leader) and even some of Bhutto’s former colleagues, many of whom were later re-elected and became federal or provincial ministers.

== National Democratic Party formed ==
With the NAP leadership largely imprisoned, a new political party was formed on the wreckage of the NAP in 1976 by Sherbaz Khan Mazari. Named National Democratic Party (NDP), it was headed by Sherbaz Khan Mazari. The Hyderabad case was withdrawn after General Muhammad Zia-ul-Haq imposed martial law in July 1977 and Afghan President Daoud Khan offered to settle all issues with Pakistan if the ban on NAP was lifted and greater autonomy for Pashtuns was introduced. Wali Khan left party affairs to Sher Baz Mazari after his release from jail in 1979. The party faced a split at that time between far left elements led by Khair Bakhsh Marri advocating outright separation and armed struggle and those advocating political struggle led by Sherbaz Khan Mazari. The split ended the alliance between Pashtun Nationalists and Baloch Nationalists that Wali Khan had formed in 1969 and led to the formation of the Pakistan National Party.

Sherbaz Khan Mazari led the NDP into joining the Movement for Restoration of Democracy. The alliance with former rivals the PPP did not go down well with Ghaffar Khan who encouraged by Governor Fazle Haq warned Ghaffar Khan of what would happen if the PPP returned to power.

This move led to a split between Mazari and Wali Khan which were aggravated after Wali Khan in a statement rejected the 1973 constitution and Wali Khan's election as NDP President.

The NDP was merged with other nationalist parties from Balochistan and Sindh in 1986 in Karachi to launch a new political party named Awami National Party with Wali Khan as its president and Rasul Bux Palejo as its general-secretary.

== See also ==
- Ajmal Khattak
- Abdul Wali Khan
- Sherbaz Khan Mazari
- Sardar Attaullah Mengal
- Mian Ghulam Jilani
- Jennifer Musa
- Habib Jalib
- Ghaus Bakhsh Bizenjo
- Mir Gul Khan Naseer
- Awami National Party
