= Sultan Mohammed Khan Mengal =

Pakistan Lieutenant Colonel (1918–2021)

- Born: November 1918
- Died: 26 September 2021 (aged 102); Quetta, Balochistan province, Pakistan
- Military career
- Allegiance: British India; Pakistan
- Branch: British Indian Army (1941–1947); Pakistan Army (1947–1967)
- Service years: 1941–1967
- Rank: Lieutenant Colonel
- Conflicts: World War II

Lieutenant Colonel (retd) Sultan Mohammed Khan Mengal (November 1918 – 26 September 2021) was the oldest Pakistan Army veteran. He joined the British Indian Army in 1941 and was commissioned in the 5th Baluch (Jacob Regiment) in 1942. Following the independence of Pakistan, he joined Pakistan Army and retired as a Lieutenant Colonel in 1967. Sultan Mohammad also held pivotal positions in Balochistan after his retirement, such as the Vice Chancellor of University of Balochistan, the Commander of the Balochistan Dehi Muhaafiz (now known as Balochistan Reserve Police) and as Director of Project Kohlu. He died on 26 September 2021 in Quetta and was 103 years old at the time of his death.

== Family ==
Sultan Mengal was born in November 1918. His father's name was Mir Habib Khan. Habib Khan belonged to the celebrated Paindzai subclan of the Zagr Mengal branch of the Mengal Tribe. Sultan Khan's mother was Bibi Hooran. She was the sister of Mir Raheem Khan, the head of the Rakhshani Badini Tribe. She was a learned woman who knew how to read Persian and also the Quran in Arabic, which was thought of as considerable achievement for a man, more-so a woman. She played an important role in raising her sons. Sultan Muhammad was the Youngest among five brothers. He also had three sisters.

His eldest brother Mir Samand Khan (born c. 1889) had served in the British Army and also as a commander in Khan of Kalat's army. His second brother Mir Lawang Khan (born c. 1901) was a tribal politician and also had the reputation of being a self-taught local doctor. He died on 7 August 1973 while fighting with the Pakistan Army during the 1973 Military Operation carried out in Balochistan by the Federal Government. Mir Lawang Khan is noted for being a martyr of the Baloch people. Sultan Mohammad was arrested the day he returned to Quetta after burying Mir Lawang Khan. Sultan Khan's third brother Mir Lal Bux Mengal (born c.1906) also served for a while in Khan of Kalat's army during which time he held a commanding position in Makran. Sultan Mohammad's Fourth Brother Mir Gul Khan Nasir was a Baloch politician, poet, historian, and journalist from Balochistan. Most of his work is in Balochi language, but he also wrote in English, Urdu, Brahui and Persian.

== Military career ==
Sultan Mengal started his military career by joining the British Indian Army in 1941 and got a commission in the 5th Baluch (Jacob Regiment) in 1942. After the independence of Pakistan, he joined Pakistan Army's Frontier Force Regiment and also served as the instructor at Infantry School Quetta. He also served as the commandant of the Khyber Rifles, 2FF Guides, Sutlej Rangers, Northern Scouts Gilgit. He retired in 1967 from Pakistan Army as a Lieutenant Colonel.

== Commander of the Balochistan Dehi Muhafiz ==
Sultan Mohammad became the first Chief of the Force for the newly established Dehi Muhafiz (Rural Police). The then provincial government of Chief Minister Ataullah Mengal sought to induct more Baloch into the provincial police and civil service. As noted in The Politics of Ethnicity in Pakistan; "[t]he Mengal Ministry dislocated 60 per cent of the non-Baloch officers of the Balochistan Reserve Police and instituted a new police structure" known as Balochistan Dehi Muhafiz (BDM). The Dehi Muhafiz also filled the gap left by the transfer of 2,600 Reserve Police to their home provinces. A white paper of the Federal government stated that 1,100 men had been recruited into the BDM, claiming they were "mostly supporters of the NAP." Hasan-Askari Rizvi says that the BDM mainly consisted of "loyal tribesmen." The formation of the BDM, together with other actions of the Mengal ministry led to a "serious rift between the provincial and federal governments."

A Federal white paper claimed the Balochistan Dehi Muhafiz force was used together with tribal lashkars to attack the Jamotes in Lasbela, then rivals of the provincial government, between December 1972 and February 1973. Around 8,000 Jamotes were "surrounded and besieged", while property losses added up to Rs. 2.6 million, the operation was not under the direct command of Col. Sultan Mohammad Mengal. This provided the Federal government, which had already been disaffected by the transfer of non-Baloch civil servants, a raison d'etre to act against the Mengal Provincial government. Previously the Federal Government looked at it with considerable suspicion and planned to defeat the BDM by any means. According to Mir Ghaus Bakhsh Bizenjo, the Balochistan Dehi Muhafiz was organised with the full knowledge and approval of the Governors’ Conference. Yet the Centre launched a campaign alleging that this was a "private army” of the NAP, ordering the Pakistan Army to take control of Lasbela District on February 9th, 1973. The PPP ministry later maintained this force, with only its name changed into “Balochistan Police Reserve", after which Col. Sultan Mohammad Mengal was removed as Chief. According to a 1981 statement of Ataullah Mengal to Tariq Ali, "Bhutto and his Punjabi aide Khar organized a police strike against our government", which, according to Taj Mohammad Breseeg "paralyzed the province."

== Death ==
Sultan Mengal died at the age of 103 in Combined Military Hospital in the city of Quetta on 26 September 2021. Pakistan military spokesman, Major General Babar Iftikhar, expressed his condolences on the demise of Sultan Mohammed Khan Mengal and described him as "a keen soldier and adventurist who had climbed, walked, skied, sailed and rowed through all of the country’s natural terrain on many expeditions".
