= Afzal Khan Lala =

Pakistani politician (1926–2015)

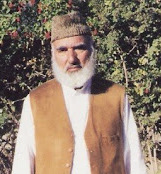
Afzal Khan Lala

Muhammed Afzal Khan Lala (also known as Afzal Khan Lala; 1926 – 1 November 2015) was a Pashtun nationalist, former Pakistani provincial and Federal minister from the Swat valley in the North-West Frontier Province. Hailing from the Yousafzai tribe of Bara Durushkhela village of Matta, Swat and a senior member of the Awami National Party, he survived several assassination attempts allegedly by the supporters of Maulana Fazlullah.

== Political career ==
Afzal Khan Lala began his political career affiliated with National Awami Party (NAP) in opposing the rule of the Wali of Swat. Formally joining the party in 1969 after Swat's merger into NWFP, he was elected member of provincial assembly in Pakistan's 1970, first ever national election. A close confidante of Abdul Wali Khan he was one of three National Awami Party provincial ministers appointed in the short-lived coalition government of Mufti Mehmud. In 1975, he was arrested by the government as part of general crackdown against the opposition and was charged as part of the Hyderabad tribunal.

Released in 1978, he was elected provincial president of the Awami National Party, however, in 1990, he and senior party leaders formed a breakaway party called the Pakhtunkhwa Qaumi Party (PQP) in protest against the Awami National Party's decision to form an alliance with the conservative Islami Jamhoori Ittehad. Allying his group to the Pakistan Peoples Party, Afzal Khan was elected to the National Assembly in the 1993 elections. Serving as Federal Minister for the Northern areas and Kashmir from 1993 to 1996, he withdrew from electoral politics after 1997. He then allied himself with the Pakistan Oppressed Nations Movement (PONM), advocating full provincial autonomy for the various ethnicities of Pakistan. In 2005 he rejoined the Awami National Party.

== Opposition to Taliban ==
One of the few opponents not in exile or dead at the hands of the Taliban in the region, Afzal Khan Lala has been guarded by relatives and members of the Awami National Party. In an interview, he said from his house in the Durushkhela area of Swat that he refuses to leave the area to Taliban: "I shall die but will not leave the ground to militants".

== Recognition by Pakistan government ==
As acknowledgement for his bravery in the face of terrorism, he was awarded the highest civilian award for bravery, the Hilal-i-Shujaat, by the President of Pakistan, in 2009.

== Death ==
Afzal Khan Lala died on 1 November 2015 in Swat, aged 89, after a protracted illness. Afghan President Ashraf Ghani, CEO Abdullah Abdullah, former President Hamid Karzai and other leaders expressed their condolences.

== See also ==
- Kabir Stori
- Raj Wali Shah Khattak
- Latif Afridi
- Afrasiab Khattak
- Maulana Fazlullah
- Khan Amirzadah Khan
- Qaumi Inqilabi Party

Political offices
Preceded by Lt. Gen. (Retd) Mohammad Shafiq	Minister for Kashmir Affairs & Northern Areas, States & Frontier Regions; November 1993 - February, 1997	Succeeded by Lt. Gen. (Retd) Abdul Majeed Malik
