= B. M. Kutty =

Pakistani politician and intellectual (1930–2019)

- Born: Biyyathil Mohyuddin Kutty; 15 July 1930; Tirur, Malabar District, Madras Presidency, British India
- Died: 25 August 2019 (aged 89); Karachi, Sindh, Pakistan
- Burial place: Paposh Nagar Graveyard, Karachi
- Citizenship: Pakistani
- Education: Mohammedan College Madras
- Occupations: Politician; Public servant; Journalist; Trade unionist; Peace activist
- Notable work: Sixty Years in Self-exile: no regrets; a political autobiography
- Political party: Communist Party of Pakistan; Azad Pakistan Party; National Awami League; National Democratic Party; National Workers Party

Biyyathil Mohyuddin Kutty (Urdu: بیاتھل محی الدین کٹی; 15 July 1930 – 25 August 2019; commonly known as B. M. Kutty) was a Pakistani journalist, public servant, politician, peace activist, trade unionist, and liberal intellectual who worked for the betterment of India–Pakistan relations. Born to a family of peasants and landowners in Chilavil–Ponmundam village of Tirur, Malabar District, Madras Presidency, Kutty was influenced by communism at an early age and joined the student faction of the Communist Party of India in the 1940s. He attended Mohammedan College in Madras from 1945 to 1949 to please his father and there he joined the Muslim Students Federation. He left the college right after the final examinations and did not wait to receive his certificates. At the age of 19 he left his family and India for Pakistan, citing his "love for geography" as the motivation behind his move.

Kutty was associated with many left and centre-left parties in Pakistan and served as the political secretary for Ghaus Bakhsh Bizenjo, a prominent Baloch leader and Governor of Balochistan. In 2011, former Indian bureaucrat and Minister of External Affairs Natwar Singh launched Kutty's autobiography Sixty Years in Self-exile: No regrets; a political autobiography.

== Early life ==
Kutty was born on 15 July 1930 at Chilavil–Ponmundam village in Tirur, Malabar District, Madras Presidency, British India, to a middle-class Malayali Muslim family of peasants and landowners. He was the eldest of five siblings. His father was a supporter of the All-India Muslim League and got Kutty admitted into Mohammedan College, Madras, in 1945. However, Kutty described his time at college as not "comfortable" and stayed there for four years only to "satisfy [his] father".

After the conclusion of his final year examinations in June 1949, he sent a telegram to his parents saying that he would return home, but instead left for Bombay without even waiting to receive his college certificates. Two months later, in August 1949, Kutty and a Malayali friend bought tickets from Bombay Central to Jodhpur railway station and entered Pakistan through the border town of Khokhrapar after stopping for a night at Munabo, the railway transit point on the India-Pakistan border. They arrived in Karachi on 14 August. Kutty described his "love for geography" and desire to visit the cultural heritage of Lahore as the reason for his immigration to Pakistan and that it had no religious motivation as it did for millions of other Muslims who left India after the partition. Passports had not been introduced by then and they walked to Khokhrapar from Munabao like many Muhajirs. The currency they exchanged at Khokhrapar had "Government of Pakistan" superimposed on the old notes with "Government of India" printed on them.

In Karachi, another Malayali man helped Kutty find a job with Larsen & Toubro; after working there for three months, Kutty left for Lahore without telling anyone about his expedition. He did not wait for the confirmation at his company or the increment that was due with it; he collected his salary and bought the railway ticket. He always wanted to visit Lahore to explore its cultural heritage, including the tombs of Jahangir, Nur Jahan, and Anarkali. He met a Malayali Hindu, A. K. Pillai, in Lahore who helped him find a job as assistant manager at Indian Coffee House.

== Political life ==
Kutty was influenced by the communist movement in Kerala and entered into political life at an early age by joining and becoming an active member of Kerala Students Federation, a local student chapter of the Communist Party of India, in the 1940s. He joined the Muslim Students Federation in 1946 during his studies at Mohammedan College of Madras.

Kutty was associated with many left and centre-left political parties in Pakistan. He was a member of the Communist Party of Pakistan, which was banned by the Government of Pakistan in 1954. Being a Malayali, he was able to work with the beedi workers of Malabar origin in Karachi without difficulty. He worked on behalf of their rights and organised their trade union.

He was involved with the Azad Pakistan Party in Lahore and later with the Pakistan Awami League in Karachi from 1950 to 1957. He joined the National Awami Party in 1957 and remained an active member until 1975, when it was banned by Zulfikar Ali Bhutto. For the next four years until 1979, Kutty was involved with the politics of the National Democratic Party; he joined the Pakistan National Party in 1979 and remained associated with it until 1997. He became a member of the National Workers Party in 1998 and served as central information secretary of the party. In the decade of the 1980s he was associated with the Movement for the Restoration of Democracy (MRD), a left–wing political alliance formed to oppose and end the military government of President Zia-ul-Haq. He served in the capacity of the joint secretary-general of the MRD for three years.

Kutty worked with Gandhian social and peace activist Nirmala Deshpande and when she died in 2008, he attended her funeral with his friend and colleague Karamat Ali and politician Sherry Rehman, and brought back her ashes to consecrate in the Indus River in accordance with her wishes. He later expressed his admiration for Deshpande and her peace activism by naming her as one of the dedicatees for his autobiography. He worked for the betterment of the India–Pakistan relationship and was associated with multiple organisations that promoted peace between these two countries. Kutty co-established and was the general secretary of the Pakistan Peace Coalition and was associated with the Pakistan–India People's Forum For Peace and Democracy. He was a committed member of the Society for Secular Pakistan, launched in 2014. He was also the secretary of the Pakistan Institute of Labor Education and Research (PILER).

=== Balochistan ===
PM Bhutto to Kutty

Why did you come to Pakistan? Unlike the Biharis and the UP wallahs and the Delhi wallahs, you had no compulsion to leave that paradise called Kerala. It also has the politics of your liking. Then why did you give all that up and come here?

— PM Zulfikar Ali Bhutto, 1973

During his time in Lahore, Kutty became a member of the Communist Party of Pakistan and met many left-leaning political workers and leaders, including prominent Baloch politician Ghaus Bakhsh Bizenjo. Kutty joined the National Awami Party (NAP) when it was founded in 1957 and became the political secretary of Bizenjo, retaining that position even when the latter served as the Governor of Balochistan from 1972 to 1973.

In February 1973, Pakistani forces raided the Iraqi embassy in Pakistan suspecting that Iraq might be colluding with the Soviet Union to arm the Baloch insurgents. Kutty came under suspicion by the Government of Pakistan because of his "unusual" credentials—a communist originally from Kerala working for a Baloch party and its leader and the-then governor. Kutty was arrested at Islamabad International Airport on the charges of treason and spying for the enemy nation, India. Almost a week later, Prime Minister Bhutto dismissed Bizenjo's government and arrested him on the suspicion that his government might be involved in arming the Baloch separatists. While Kutty was in prison and being tortured for his alleged crimes, his daughter, Yasmin Mohyuddin, was expelled from Bolan Medical College. These events culminated in Kutty's writing an impassioned letter to Bhutto expressing his anger. After receiving the letter, the Prime Minister called for Kutty to be brought to his house and asked Kutty, referring to his Malayali and communist origins: "Why did you come to Pakistan? Unlike the Biharis and the UP and Delhiwalas, you had no compulsion to leave that paradise called Kerala. It also has the politics of your liking. Then why did you give all that up and come here?"

== Autobiography ==
In 2011 Kutty published his autobiography Sixty Years in Self-exile: No regrets; a political autobiography, in which he narrated his journey from Kerala to Karachi and the reasons he decided to acquire the citizenship of Pakistan. The book was launched by former Indian bureaucrat and Minister of External Affairs Natwar Singh. Kutty dedicated his book to four women whom he admired the most in his life: his mother Biriya Umma, peace activist Nirmala Deshpande, politician and former Prime Minister of Pakistan Benazir Bhutto, and Kutty's wife Birjis Siddiqui. The title of the book was suggested by Deshpande in 2007.

== Personal life ==
Kutty married Birjis Siddiqui, an Urdu-speaking woman originating from Uttar Pradesh, on 21 January 1951 in a wedding ceremony in Lahore attended by five Malayalis. He remembered how he did not know the language of his wife but "it didn't matter". The couple had four children. Kutty's wife died in 2010.

In 2015 Kutty suffered a paralytic stroke that forced him to take bed rest for five months and affected his speech. He went to Kerala with the help of his family and friends for Ayurvedic treatment, which lasted over two months and helped him get back his normal speech.

Kutty had deep affection for the Malayalam language. Contrary to popular practice by other Muslim students, he chose to study Malayalam in school as a second language instead of Arabic and studied Malayalam literature in college. He used to obtain and read Malayalam newspapers, Malayala Manorama and Mathrubhumi, as long as they were available in Pakistan. He worked as a journalist for Mathrubhumi and reported from Pakistan for the newspaper.

== Death ==
After suffering from a prolonged illness and paralysis, Kutty died on 25 August 2019 at the age of 89. He was buried in Paposh Nagar Graveyard, Karachi; his funeral prayer, Salat al-Janazah, was recited earlier at Abu Hanifa Mosque in Gulshan-i-Iqbal.

== Bibliography ==
- B. M. Kutty (2011). Sixty Years in Self-exile: No regrets; a political autobiography. Karachi: Pakistan Study Centre, University of Karachi. ISBN 9789698791247. OCLC 733548534.
