= Hassan Nasir =

Pakistani proletarian leader (1928-1960)

- حسن ناصر

Personal details
- Born: 1 January 1928 Hyderabad, G/13/1 Street:87 House;56, British Raj (now in Telangana, India)
- Died: 13 November 1960 (aged 32) Lahore, Punjab, Pakistan
- Occupation: Proletariat Leader
- Nickname: Hasan Bhai

Hassan Nasir (1 January 1928 – 13 November 1960) was a Pakistani proletarian leader, Secretary General of the proscribed Communist Party of Pakistan (CPP) and Office Secretary in the National Awami Party. Hasan Nasir was born in Hyderabad (Deccan) and had fought, along with Makhdoom Mohiuddin and others, in the Telangana Peasants’ Revolt against the Razakars.

== Early life ==
Nasir was a maternal grandson of Nawab Mohsin-ul-Mulk, one of the founders of the All-India Muslim League. After completing college, he was admitted into the University of Cambridge in England where he came into contact with various Marxist ideologues and soon became inspired by the rhetoric he heard. Upon his return to India, he joined forces with the oppressed Hindu peasants of Telangana and took part in anti-colonial uprisings to the chagrin of his bourgeoisie family. In the aftermath of the Partition of India and the Liberation of Hyderabad from the rule of the Nizam by Indian forces, the communist movement in Telangana collapsed and a temporary military administration was instituted in the region which subdued the collectivized communes established by the peasant rebels. The Indian Army soon pursued the remaining communist guerrilla factions in the countryside, which prompted Nasir to migrate to Pakistan in 1947. Upon arrival in Karachi in 1950, he resumed his political activities and soon became one of the most dreaded communists in the new nation to the ruling elite of right-wing Islamists. Thus, despite being the scion of an aristocratic family in Hyderabad (Deccan), he had taken up the cause of the oppressed. He was a popular left-wing activist among students, peasants, and laborers. In 1954, he was arrested by the government, imprisoned, tortured and then forcibly flown back to India. But only a year later, he escaped Indian custody and returned again to Pakistan. Nasir's reconnection with Indian communists further radicalized his ideology and hardened him as a person, and he began serving as the office secretary of the National Awami Party (NAP) after his arrival back to Karachi.

== Death ==
In 1960, he was arrested in Karachi and put in a cell in the Lahore Fort and brutally tortured till he died. He died while under interrogation in Lahore Fort, a detention centre established by the Martial-Law regime of Ayub Khan. After his murder his mangled body was hastily buried by the police. The reports of torture were frightening and succeeded in halting the protests for several months. There was such a fervor over his martyrdom that the President Ayub Khan government had to exhume his body to attempt to prove to the prosecution point that he had committed suicide and was not tortured. The reason was that the government did not want to let remain anything reminding the people of Hassan Nasir. Today, there remains nothing of that cell, where he was killed, except a wall containing a small window.

Hassan Nasir was brought to Lahore Fort's cell on 13 September 1960. On 13 November, at 12:40 pm, the Assistant Deputy Inspector General of the Criminal Investigation Department received a call from the line officer at the Lahore Fort that Hassan Nasir was found hanging in cell number 13 at 11:00 am that morning.

On 4 December 1960, Hasan Nasir’s mother, Zahra Alamdar Hussein, arrived in Lahore from her home in Hyderabad, India. She witnessed the exhumation of the body in the Miani Sahib Graveyard on 12 December 1960 for the possession. The body suffered an advanced stage of decomposition and thus not identifiable. Mrs. Hussein issued a statement at the court that she did not think the body was that of Hasan Nasir’s and refused to take the possession. The Anarkali Police later reburied the body into an unknown grave.

== References in literature and popular culture ==
- Sibte Hassan in his book Sher-e-Nigaran briefly discussed Hasan Nasir
- Maj. Ishaq Muhammad in his book Hassan Nasir Ki Shahdat
