= Qaumi Inqilabi Party =

Qaumi Inqilabi Party قومی الانقلابی پارٹی National Revolutionary Party
- Leaders: Afrasiab Khattak; Afzal Khan Lala
- Founded: 1987
- Political position: Left-wing

Qaumi Inqilabi Party (Urdu: قومی الانقلابی پارٹی, 'National Revolutionary Party') was a political party in Pakistan. It was founded in 1987 through the merger of different leftist groups. However, the party was disbanded the following year. Afrasiab Khattak and Afzal Khan Lala were leading figures in the party.
