= Ghaus Bakhsh Bizenjo =

Pakistani Baloch politician (d. 1989)

Mir Ghaus Bakhsh Bizenjo
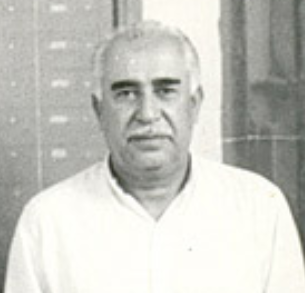

3rd Governor of Balochistan
- In office 29 April 1972 – 15 February 1973
- Chief Minister: Ataullah Mengal
- Preceded by: Ghous Bakhsh Raisani
- Succeeded by: Akbar Khan Bugti

Personal details
- Born: December 1917 or 1919 Khuzdar, Kalat State, British India (present-day Khuzdar, Balochistan, Pakistan)
- Died: 11 August 1989 (aged 70–72) Quetta, Balochistan, Pakistan
- Party: Pakistan National Party
- Children: 2, including Hasil Bizenjo (son)
- Profession: Mir of the Bizenjo Tribe
- In Search of Solutions: The Autobiography of Mir Ghaus Buksh Bizenjo (pdf version), edited by B.M. Kutty, Published by Pakistan Labour Trust and University of Karachi's (KU) Pakistan Study Centre, 2009

Mir Ghaus Bakhsh Bizenjo (Urdu/Baloch: میرغوث بخش بزنجو) was a Pakistani politician from Balochistan. He served as the 3rd Governor of Balochistan.

== Early life ==
One of the founding members of the National Awami Party, he served as the Governor of Balochistan from 1972 to 1973 and was a key signatory to Pakistan's Third constitution – Constitution of Pakistan of 1973.

== Entry into politics ==
In 1938, after returning from Aligarh, Ghaus Bakhsh joined the Baloch League, a party based in Karachi which was formed by some Baloch intellectuals.

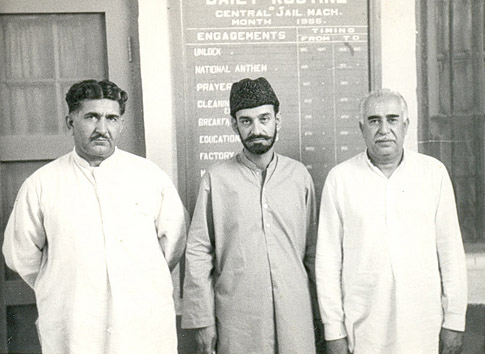
Gul Khan Nasir (left), Ataullah Mengal (middle) and Ghaus Bakhsh Bizenjo (right) in a group photo taken in Mach Jail

In 1939 the Kalat State National Party (KSNP) arranged its annual convention in Mastung. The Baloch League sent Mir Ghaus Bakhsh Bizenjo as a representative to attend the convention. On 6 July 1939 an armed tribal force was sent by the Sardars of Balochistan to disrupt the annual rally of the KSNP. This tribal force opened fire on the participants of the rally but police and Levies Force interfered in time and a potential bloodbath was averted. After this incident many of the KSNP workers and leaders were either arrested or exiled from Kalat. Abdul Rahim Khwaja Khel, Babu Abdul Karim Shorish and others who were at Government Posts resigned. Mir Gul Khan Nasir who was the Secretary Judicial Affairs, Mir Hammal Khan who was the Custom Officer, Mir Mohammad Faazal Khan Mohammad Shahi who was Education Minister and Faiz Mohammad Yousafzai who was Assistant Collector also tendered in their resignations though it is believed that the resignations of Mir Gul Khan and Mir Hammal Khan were accepted in 1941. After this incident Mir Ghaus Bakhsh Bizenjo joined the KSNP. In fact, the resignations of Mir Gul Khan Nasir, Mir Abdul Aziz Kurd and Mir Hammal Khan are believed to have been tendered in as a result of Mir Ghaus Bakhsh's efforts. Initially he was against independence.

== Muslim League ==
After Balochistan joined Pakistan, the Khan of Kalat Ahmed Yar Khan decided to join the Muslim League. He sent Ajmal Khan to go and persuade Mir Ghaus Bakhsh and Gul Khan Nasir to join the party with him. Both Ghaus Bakhsh and Gul Khan thought this would be a good opportunity to further their political cause so, they joined the party. Ghaus Bakhsh also persuaded Abdullah Jan Jamaldini, Ghulam Mohammed Baloch and Bahadur Khan to join Muslim League. In 1955, all of West Pakistan's provinces and princely states were merged into one unit. This was not acceptable to the Baloch nationalists. So, on 14 July 1955, Ghaus Bakhsh Bizenjo, Abdul Karim, Gul Khan Nasir, Mohammad Hussain Anqa and Qadir Bakhsh Nizamani formed the Usthman Gal which means "The People's Party".

== Usthman Gal ==
In 1955, all of West Pakistan's provinces and princely states were merged into one unit. This policy was highly criticized by Baloch nationalists. So, on 14 July 1955 Ghaus Bakhsh Bizenjo, Agha Abdul Karim, Mir Gul Khan Nasir, Mohammad Hussain Anqa and Qadir Bakhsh Nizamani formed the Usthman Gal which means "The People's Party".

== Pakistan National Party ==
In 1956, Usthman Gal and Warur Pashtun from Balochistan, Khudai Khidmatgar from North-West Frontier Province, Azad Pakistan Party from Punjab, Sindh Mahaaz and Sindh Hari Committee from Sindh merged to form the Pakistan National Party. PNP was an umbrella for progressive people from all walks of life. It was composed solely of ethnic nationalists, socialists and communists.

== National Awami Party ==
In 1957, Maulana Bhashani broke off from Awami League and joined the Pakistan National Party (PNP), thus, the National Awami Party came into being. This became the biggest party of Pakistan containing within its folds, some of the most prominent progressive politicians of that era.

=== Ayub's martial law ===
In 1958, Field Marshal Ayub Khan imposed martial law in Pakistan. One day Mir Ghaus Bakhsh bought some shot gun cartridges from an ammunition store. One of the notes that he used to pay for the cartridges had an inscription "Down With One Unit" on it. When the Government found out about this, Mir Ghaus Bakhsh Bizenjo was arrested and sent to the "Quli Camp" which was quite a notorious and infamous torture camp located in Quetta Cantt. Other Baloch leaders like Mir Gul Khan Nasir and Faiz Mohammad Yousafzai were also imprisoned and put in the "Quli Camp".

Here they were subjected to inhumane torture and abuse. Ataullah Mengal quotes Mir Gul Khan Nasir as saying:

"They kept Mir Ghaus Bakhsh Bizenjo separate from us and tortured him so much that when he was brought back I didn't recognize him. He used to shave but now the guards were bringing an old man with a beard."

=== National Awami Party government ===
In the 1970 General Election in Pakistan, the NAP came out as a majority party in North-West Frontier Province and Balochistan. Ghaus Bakhsh Bizenjo was elected from the Lyari Town area of Karachi with the help of another notable politician of Pakistan – Mahmoud Haroon. In 1972, NAP formed its governments in both the provinces. In Balochistan Mir Ghaus Bakhsh Bizenjo became the Governor of Balochistan and Sardar Ataullah Khan Mengal became the first Chief Minister of Balochistan. Mir Gul Khan Nasir was a Senior Minister in this Government and held the portfolios of Education and Health. Nawab Khair Bakhsh Marri, Sardar Ahmed Nawaz Bugti and Sardar Abdul Rehman Baloch of KECH were other Members of the Provincial Assembly from NAP. Dr. Abdul Hai Baloch was a member of the National Assembly of Pakistan.

== Constitutional Committee ==
Pakistan ran under the remnant of Martial Law LFO (Legal Framework Order) without any proper constitution. It was obligatory on the Legislature to frame a new constitution for a country, so it appointed a 25-member Constitutional committee composed of all the political parties represented in the parliament according to their strength on 17 April 1972, to prepare a draft of the permanent Constitution of Pakistan.

Khan Amirzadah Khan and Mir Ghous Bux Bizenjo were representing National Awami Party. This Constitutional Committee headed Abdul Hafiz Pirzada of Pakistan Peoples Party work day and night for many months and framed a draft constitution which was presented in the parliament and adopted as the well-known 1973 constitution.

Khan Amirzadah Khan deliberated and delivered his famous speech of 5 hours and 35 minutes on this constitution, this speech is still holding the record of the longest extempore speech of the National Assembly of Pakistan.

According to this constitution, no person could hold membership of more than 1 Assembly at a time. Hence, Khan Abdul Wali Khan resigned from the membership of NWFP assembly and retained the seat of National Assembly of Pakistan. On the advice of the party leadership, Khan Amirzadah Khan resigned from the National Assembly and retained the membership of NWFP assembly seat. Where Khan Amirzadah Khan was elected as leader of the opposition, which he retained till the end of the tenure of the assembly.

=== Dismissal of NAP government and arrest ===
In 1973, the Bhutto regime citing Nawab Akbar Bugti's claim that the NAP Leaders were trying to disintegrate Pakistan as a basis, dismissed the NAP Government. Mir Ghaus Bakhsh resigned in protest. Mir Gul Khan Nasir and Sardar Abdul Rehman were arrested. A few days later Ghaus Bakhsh Bizenjo, Ataullah Mengal, Khair Bakhsh Marri, Mir Ghaus Bakhsh's son Bizen and Colonel (R) Sultan Mohammad Khan (the head of Balochistan Reserve Police) were arrested. They spent more than four years in jail.

=== Hyderabad tribunal ===
Later, a commission known as Hyderabad tribunal, was set up and Mir Ghaus Bakhsh Bizenjo, Sardar Ataullah Mengal, Mir Gul Khan Nasir, Khair Bakhsh Marri, Khan Abdul Wali Khan, Khan Amirzadah Khan, Syed Muhammad Kaswar Gardezi, Habib Jalib and many others had to defend themselves in a treason case in front of the tribunal.

After the ouster of Zulfiqar Ali Bhutto's government by General Muhammad Zia-ul-Haq, negotiations for the winding up of the Hyderabad tribunal and the release of all detainees was initiated leading to their eventual release in 1979.

== NDP and PNP parties ==
After their release Khair Bakhsh Marri and Sherof Marri decided to opt out of Parliamentary politics while Mir Ghaus Bakhsh, Mir Gul Khan Nasir and Ataullah Mengal joined Wali Khan's National Democratic Party or NDP. But after the Saur Revolution, Mir Ghaus Bakhsh and Wali Khan developed differences and Mir Ghaus Bakhsh along with Mir Gul Khan formed the Pakistan National Party (PNP) while Ataullah Mengal went into exile in London.

On 1984 mir was home-prisoned at mashkay rest house for 6 month at Tehsil Mashkay Gajjar town. After some time, Mir Ghaus Bakhsh and Mir Gul Khan Nasir had a falling out due to which Gul Khan (who was the President of PNP Balochistan) resigned from his post in the party.

On 14 August 1986, Benazir Bhutto led an Independence Day march in Karachi against the General Zia Ul-Haq's regime and addressed nearly 10,000 people in that protest march, after which she was arrested by the police. Ghaus Bakhsh Bizenjo as head of Pakistan National Party had also tried to reach the protest meeting to make a speech, but was also arrested.

In 1988, Mir Ghaus Bakhsh Bizenjo took part in the elections but lost. This was Mir Bizenjo's last election.

== Death ==
Mir Ghaus Bakhsh Bizenjo died on 11 August 1989. His sons remain active in Baloch politics. After the death of Mir Ghaus Bakhsh, his son Mir Bizen Bizenjo took over the political faction of his father. But after sometime, Ghaus Bakhsh's younger son Mir Hasil Bizenjo rose to prominence while Bizen Bizenjo faded into the background.

== Legacy ==
Mir Ghaus Bakhsh Bizenjo along with Nawab Yousaf Aziz Magsi, Abdul Aziz Kurd, Mir Gul Khan Nasir and Faiz Mohammad Yousafzai is considered to be one of the founders of democratic politics in Balochistan and is, to this day, remembered as "Baba i Balochistan" or "The Father of Balochistan" by Baloch nationalists.

In 2017, at a public meeting organized on the 28th death anniversary of Ghaus Bakhsh Bizenjo, the then chief minister of Balochistan Sanaullah Zehri criticized the people waging a war against Pakistan and under the cover of Baloch liberation. He stated that these political leaders were enjoying their lives in Europe and in other Western countries and yet they were inciting local Baloch people to rebel against the state of Pakistan. He praised Bizenjo's politics of reconciliation with the state of Pakistan. He also said that Bizenjo never favoured militancy in Balochistan and always preferred talks to bring durable peace and development in Balochistan.

== Bibliography ==
- Bizenjo, Mir Ghaus Bakhsh (2009). B. M. Kutty (ed.). In Search of Solutions: An Autobiography of Mir Ghaus Bakhsh Bizenjo. Pakistan Study Centre, University of Karachi. ISBN 9789698791223.
- 2013, Maqsad e Siyasat, Urdu translation of In Search of Solution by Huma Anwar. ISBN 9789699739392

== See also ==
- Mir Hasil Khan Bizenjo
- Mir Gul Khan Nasir
- National Party
- Hyderabad tribunal
- Khan Abdul Wali Khan
- Khan Amirzadah Khan
- B. M. Kutty

Political offices
Preceded by Mir Ghaus Bakhsh Raisani	Governor of Balochistan; 1972–1973	Succeeded by Akbar Bugti
