= Tehkal Bala =

Town in Peshawar, Pakistan

Tehkal Bala is a town in Peshawar District, in the Khyber Pakhtunkhwa province of Pakistan.
