= Habib Jalib Baloch =

Pakistani politician (1959–2010)

Habib Jalib Baloch (Pirkani)
- Born: Habib-ullah; 1959; Quetta, Balochistan, Pakistan
- Died: 14 July 2010 (aged 50–51); Balochistan, Pakistan
- Citizenship: Pakistan
- Education: Master of Arts in International Relations; Bachelor of Law (LLB); Master of philosophy (M.Phil) in the discipline of Philosophy, Political economy, international Law and journalism.; University of Balochistan; Institute of Social Sciences, Moscow
- Occupations: Lawyer, Politician, writer, Philosopher
- Writing career
- Notable work: Balochistan Statehood And Nationalism
- Literary movement: Baloch Student Organization (BSO); Progressive Youth Movement (PYM); Balochistan National Movement (BNM); Balochistan National Party (BNP)

Habib Jalib Baloch (Urdu: حبیب جالب بلوچ) was a Supreme Court lawyer and a Baloch nationalist politician who served as a member of the Senate of Pakistan in 1997 and as the secretary general of the Balochistan National Party. In his student days, he served in several leadership positions of the Baloch Students Organization (BSO) as Chairman of BSO and also remained Editor of BSO Organs, i.e., "Girok, Sangat," and "Bam" (1978–82).

His famous writings include "Struggle for National and Social Liberation in Balochistan" (Russian language) (First Edition), published in Moscow (ISC) in 1986, and (Second Edition) in Balochistan, Pakistan, in the year 2006 under the title "Balochistan: Statehood and Nationalism."

== Death ==
Habib Jalib Baloch was gunned down by unknown assassins in Quetta on July 14, 2010. Following his assassination, protests were held in cities across Pakistan while a general strike was held across Balochistan province for three days and 40 days of mourning for the Baloch Leader.
