= Mahmud Ali Kasuri =

Pakistani politician

Mian Mahmud Ali Kasuri (1910–1987) was a Pakistani politician, former Law Minister, human rights advocate and lawyer who became a Senior Advocate Supreme Court.

He served in the Indian National Congress (INC) before Pakistan's creation, as well as the All-India Muslim League; and subsequently formed the Azad Pakistan Party before becoming one of the founders of the National Awami Party (NAP), briefly serving as the party President. As a leftist lawyer, he was a recipient of the Stalin Peace Prize as well as serving on the Russell Tribunal, created by Bertrand Russell for trying American war crimes in Vietnam. He developed a close association with Zulfikar Ali Bhutto following the latter's imprisonment in 1968; this in addition to his frustration with the NAP led to his quitting the party.

In 1970, he joined the Pakistan People's Party (PPP), was elected Member National Assembly in a by-election on one of the seats vacated by party founder Zulfikar Ali Bhutto and served as a Law Minister in the President Bhutto's cabinet. He played a key role in the formation of Pakistan's first constitution in 1973. He later left the PPP after becoming disillusioned with the increasing brutality with which the government targeted the opposition. He also defended his former comrades in the National Awami Party when they were imprisoned by the PPP government for high treason. After leaving the PPP, he joined the opposition Tehrik-e-Istiqlal of Asghar Khan in 1973, remaining associated with that party until his death in 1987. He was educated at Islamia College, Lahore and Punjab University Law College, Lahore.

== See also ==
- Khurshid Mahmud Kasuri, son
