= Sherbaz Khan Mazari =

Pakistani politician (1930–2020)

Leader of the Opposition
- In office 17 August 1975 – 5 July 1977
- President: Fazal Ilahi Chaudhry
- Prime Minister: Zulfikar Ali Bhutto
- Preceded by: Khan Abdul Wali Khan
- Succeeded by: Fakhar Imam

Personal details
- Born: 6 October 1930 Rojhan, Punjab Province, British India (now Pakistan)
- Died: 5 December 2020 (aged 90)
- Party: Independent (Before 1975); National Democratic Party (1975–1977); Pakistan National Alliance (1977–1981); Movement for the Restoration of Democracy (1981–1988)
- Children: Sherazam Khan Mazari; Sher Ali Khan Mazari; Shehryar Khan Mazari; Murad Khan Mazari; Samia Mazari; Sherafzal Khan Mazari; Sher Koh Khan Mazari

Sherbaz Khan Mazari (Urdu: سردار شیر باز خان مزاری) (6 October 1930 – 5 December 2020) was a Pakistani politician and a leader of the opposition in the National Assembly.

== Career ==
Mazari was born in Rojhan Mazari on October 5, 1930. His father, Mir Murad Bakhsh Khan, was the chief of the Mazari tribe in Dera Ghazi Khan.

Having lost his mother when he was one year old and his father when he was two years old, as an orphan, Sherbaz, his two brothers, Sardar Mir Balakh Sher, Sardar Sher Janand and three sisters were placed under the guardianship of the British government. He studied at Aitchison College at Lahore and at the Royal Indian Military College at Dehradun.He also studied in University of Oxford

Mazari entered politics when Fatima Jinnah contested the presidential election against Ayub Khan. Mazari supported Ms Jinnah even though he knew that the election would be engineered.

He has been described by many as a man of principle. When General Yahya Khan took over, he opposed the undemocratic transition. He also opposed Yahya Khan’s military action in the then East Pakistan. When Zulfikar Ali Bhutto came into power, Mazari supported the Pakistan Peoples Party. In 1970, when every politician was vying for a PPP ticket, he contested the National Assembly election as an independent.

Mazari tried to resolve the Balochistan issue politically in the National Assembly, However, Bhutto opted for military action. Later, Mazari joined the Wali Khan-led National Awami Party (NAP). When it was banned, Mazari formed the National Democratic Party (NDP).

He remained the leader of the opposition in the parliament till 1977. It is worth mentioning that Mazari was a signatory to the 1973 Constitution as head of the independent group in the National Assembly. Mazari became part of the campaign launched by the Pakistan National Alliance that ultimately led to the ouster of Bhutto’s government on July 5, 1977. However, in 1983, he supported the PPP and other parties in launching the Movement for the Restoration of Democracy (MRD) against Zia.

The Mazari clan had a long standing rivalry with the Bugtis. Despite that, Mazari requested Zulfikar Ali Bhutto to negotiate a way out for Nawab Akbar Bugti during the Ayub Khan era.

In 1951, he settled in Sonmiani, on the east bank of the Indus river. As a tribal chief, he had to look after the affairs of the tribe. The locals still remember his golden days and say they had felt safe when Mazari was there. No one dared steal from or rob anyone in the area. He used to resolve the disputes and old feuds within days. In a jirga no one could pressure him into deciding unjustly. It is often claimed that most feudal lords use and protect criminal gangs. However, Sher Baz Khan Mazari would have none of such tactics. During his time, no criminal gangs emerged in the area. People used to sleep safe and sound without the fear of criminals. Today, there are more than 200 criminals are based in Sonmani.

He had a refined literary taste and had a large collection of books in his personal library. This is evident from his autobiography, A Journey to Disillusionment, that was published in 1999.

In 1980, Mazari was offered prime ministership by General Zia. However, he refused the offer because of his belief in democracy. After losing in elections in 1988, Mazari left Rajanpur and permanently settled in Karachi where he spent the rest of his life. He was buried in Rojhan, where thousands of people came to grieve his loss.

He is survived by five sons and one daughter: Sherazam Mazari, Sher Ali Mazari, Sher Koh Mazari, Samia Mazari, Murad Bukhsh Mazari, And Sher Afzal Mazari.

In 1999, he wrote his memoir, titled Pakistan: A Journey to Disillusionment.

== Books ==
- Mazari, Sherbaz Khan (1999). A Journey to Disillusionment. Oxford University Press. ISBN 9780195790764.

== See also ==
- Hyderabad tribunal

Political offices
| Preceded by Khan Abdul Wali Khan | Leader of the Opposition; 1975–1977 | Succeeded by Fakhar Imam |
