= Hayat Sherpao =

Pakistani politician (1937–1975)

Hayat Mohammad Khan Sherpao

8th Governor of North-West Frontier Province
- In office 25 December 1971 – 20 April 1972
- President: Zulfikar Ali Bhutto
- Preceded by: Khwaja Mohammad Azhar Khan
- Succeeded by: Arbab Sikandar Khan

Personal details
- Born: 1 February 1937 Peshawar, North-West Frontier Province, British India
- Died: 8 February 1975 (aged 38) Peshawar, North-West Frontier Province, Pakistan
- Cause of death: Assassination
- Resting place: Sherpao, Charsadda District, Khyber-Pakhtunkhwa Province
- Party: Pakistan People's Party
- Relations: Aftab Ahmad Khan Sherpao, Wali Muhammad Khan, Dost Muhammad Khan, Abdul Wadood Khan, Sher Muhammad Khan
- Education: Islamia College University
- Occupation: Political leader

Hayat Mohammad Khan Sherpao (Urdu: حيات محمد خان شيرپاؤ; 1 February 1937 – 8 February 1975), simply known as Hayat Sherpao, was a left-wing intellectual and socialist, who served as the 15th Governor of North West Frontier Province (now the Khyber Pakhtunkhwa province) of Pakistan, as well as vice-chairman of Pakistan People's Party. Sherpao held important executive offices, including serving as the Interior minister and had held a number of provincial ministries of the North West Frontier Province. He was assassinated in 1975, and his death was blamed on a rival political party in the province - the Awami National Party of Khan Abdul Wali Khan.

== Political career ==
Co-founding the Pakistan People's Party with Zulfiqar Ali Bhutto in 1967, Sherpao took the responsibility to govern the Sarhad Province at a difficult time when the country had lost East-Pakistan as a result of the 1971 war with rival India. As governor, he oversaw the re-constitution of the provisional assembly, stabilising the law and order situation in the so-called tribal belt, and overseeing the success of covert operations in Afghanistan in 1975. His governorship and Sherpao himself tackled and faced intense opposition led by Abdul Wali Khan, and was assassinated in a targeted bomb explosion on the campus of Peshawar University in 1975.

== Early life and education ==
Hayat Sherpao was born in 1937 to Khan Bahadar Ghulam Haider Khan Sherpao, who was an activist of the Pakistan Movement. A Muhammadzai by tribe, he was born in the influential Sherpao family of the North West Frontier Province. He was the fifth son of Khan Bahadar Ghulam Haider Khan Sherpao, a Pakhtun aristocrat who played a role in the Pakistan movement. Hayat Khan was also the elder brother of veteran Pakistani politician Aftab Ahmad Khan Sherpao.

Hayat Khan's impressive family tree and cross-marriages in other influential families gave him an edge over others in influence and politics. Hayat Khan's family (known as the Khans of Sherpao) has for long been a prominent and influential family in the Khyber-Pakhtunkhwa. From his mother's side, Hayat descends from the line of the Khans of Prang.

Hayat Sherpao graduated from Islamia College, Peshawar, where he also worked for student rights. He joined the front ranks in Fatima Jinnah's electoral campaign, when she challenged the General Ayub Khan's dictatorship.

== Lion of the Frontier ==
Sherpao was a close ally of the former president and prime minister of Pakistan Zulfiqar Ali Bhutto and a co-founder of the Pakistan People's Party (PPP). On 25 December 1971 Sherpao became the 15th Governor of Khyber-Pakhtunkhwa shortly after Bhutto had become president of Pakistan. At the age of 34, Sherpao was the youngest person to have held the office of a governor of a province in the history of Pakistan. He continued to hold this office till 30 April 1972. Sherpao also remained a federal minister in Zulfikar Ali Bhutto's cabinet and a senior minister in the Khyber-Pakhtunkhwa cabinet.

Hayat Khan Sherpao's rise in politics was swift. The surge in his popularity in Khyber-Pakhtunkhwa is said to have cast many jealous eyes upon him and earned him a number of enemies, quite often in the form of seasoned and already established politicians from other mainstream political parties. This popularity and political success, however, also led to him being dubbed the "Lion of the Frontier" or "Sher-i-Sarhad" by the Pakistan People's Party, and more specifically by Zulfiqar Ali Bhutto.

== Assassination ==
He was assassinated on 8 February 1975, in a bomb explosion on the campus of University of Peshawar. Abdul Wali Khan, the leader of National Awami Party (Wali) was named as the primary person accused by the Bhutto government. Hayat Sherpao's death led the government to target the National Awami Party of Khan Abdul Wali Khan. This political party was banned and some of the party leaders were arrested on the charge of his murder, a charge of which they were eventually acquitted.

Hayat Sherpao's assassination was considered a national loss with many still mourning his loss today. To pay tribute to the slain PPP leader many places, roads, and institutions were named after him. The Peshawar suburb of Hayatabad and Hayat Shaheed Hospital in Peshawar District, Sherpao Bridge in Lahore and many Sherpao colonies in different parts of Pakistan were named after him.

== Legacy ==
On the death anniversaries of Hayat Mohammad Khan Sherpao, politicians and other citizens renew their pledge for the establishment of an egalitarian society. Many Pakistani newspapers give it news coverage on his death anniversary day.

Hayat Sherpao legacy is now carried by his younger brother Aftab Sherpao, who learned politics and diplomacy form his elder brother. Carrying forward the mission, he then formed his own party named Qaumi Watan Party (QWP). The Sherpao faction has raised a voice for the rights of the Pakhtoon people and the province.

Hayat Sher Pao Shahid railway station was also named after Hayat Sherpao.

== See also ==
- Aslam Khattak

Political offices
Preceded by K.M. Azhar Khan	Governor of Khyber-Pakhtunkhwa; 1971–1972	Succeeded by Arbab Sikandar Khan
