= Azad Pakistan Party =

Defunct political party in Pakistan

Azad Pakistan Party آزاد پاکستان پارٹی
- Founder: Mian Iftikharuddin
- Founded: November 1949
- Dissolved: 1957
- Split from: ML
- Merged into: NAP
- Political position: Left-wing

The Azad Pakistan Party was a leftist Pakistani party founded in November 1949 by Mian Iftikharuddin, an ex-Congressite and a member of the Muslim League who worked for the Pakistan Movement. It was formed in 1949, becoming Pakistan's first leftist opposition party. It, however, failed to make any impact and was later merged with the National Awami Party.
