= Gul Khan Nasir =

Pakistani politician and writer (1914–1983)

Mir Gul Khan Naseer
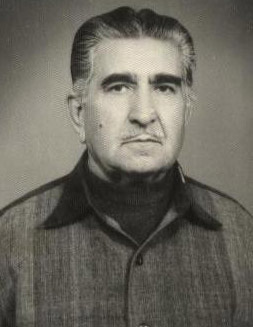

1st Education Minister of Balochistan
- In office 1 May 1972 – 13 February 1973
- Chief Minister: Ataullah Mengal
- Preceded by: Office established
- Succeeded by: Governor's rule for 2 months

Personal details
- Born: 14 May 1914 Noshki, Baluchistan, British India (present-day Balochistan, Pakistan)
- Died: 6 December 1983 (aged 69) Karachi, Sindh, Pakistan
- Party: Usthman Gul, National Awami Party

Gul Khan Naseer (Balochi:میر گل خان نصیر; Urdu: میر گل خان نصیر) also known as Malek o-Sho'arā Balochistan (Balochi:ملک‌ شعراء بلوچستان; Urdu:ملک‌ شعراء بلوچستان); 14 May 1914 – 6 December 1983) was a Pakistani politician, poet, historian, and journalist from Balochistan. Most of his work is in Balochi language, but he also wrote in English, Urdu, Brahui and Persian.

== Early life and education ==
Nasir was born in 1914 into a Baloch Muslim family in Noshki during the British Raj. His father Habib Khan belonged to the Paindzai family of the Zagar Mengal sub branch of the Mengal tribe. Gul Khan's mother, Bibi Hooran, belonged to the Bolazai branch of the Badini Rakshani.

Gul Khan Nasir studied until fourth grade in his village. For further studies he was sent to Quetta where he was admitted to the Government Sandeman High School. He subsequently went to Lahore to pursue higher education at Islamia College Lahore. During his second year at Islamia College, a piece of coal went into his eye, causing him to leave education and return to Quetta.

Lahore was then the hub of knowledge and political and social activities. The political, cultural, social and literary movements in Lahore made quite an impression on Nasir. When he returned to Quetta, Balochistan was administratively split into several parts, namely, The Chief Commissioner's Province under direct British rule and the Princely states under indirect British rule through Tribal chiefs (Sardars). Nasir entered politics to campaign throughout Balochistan for an end to British rule over South Asia and curbing the influence of tribal chiefs over Balochistan.

== Boxing ==
When he went to Lahore, Nasir saw the students taking part in different sports so he joined the college football team. He also learned boxing.

"Boxing helped Gul Khan Nasir get out of many a tight spot in his life" – Aqil Khan Mengal

He participated in boxing tournaments. In the All India Universities Boxing Championship, he was the runner-up. At this tournament he broke his nose.

== Kalat State National Party ==
After the ban on "Anjuman-e-Islamia Riyasat-e-Kalat," on 5 February 1937, the young politicians of Kalat got together again and formed a new political organization, Kalat State National Party (KSNP). Party members elected Mir Abdul Aziz Kurd as president, Mir Gul Khan Nasir as vice president, and Malik Faiz Muhammad Yousafzai became the Secretary General. The Kalat State National Party was affiliated with the Indian National Congress. It played an important role in curbing the power and influence of the Sardars Tribal Chieftains, fought for the abolition of taxes imposed on the poor by the Sardars, and campaigned for the establishment of a democratically elected Parliament fashioned after the British Parliament upon independence. The KSNP had several ups and downs with the Khan of Kalat. At first, most of the top leaders of the party such as Abdul Aziz Kurd, Faiz Muhammad Yoyusafzai, Gul Khan Nasir, Abdul Rahim Khwajakhel, Aalijah Ghaus Bakhsh Gazgi etc. were serving as government officials. In 1939, during an annual session of KSNP in which Mir Ghaus Bakhsh Bizenjo was also taking part as a representative of a Karachi-based political party, some armed men, allegedly sent by the local sardars tried to disrupt the rally by firing at the participants. After that all the members of the Party who had government jobs resigned and were arrested. This was the incident which caused Mir Ghaus Bakhsh Bizenjo to join the KSNP. After some time the Khan reconciled with the KSNP leaders and re-employed them as government officials. Once again tensions rose between the KSNP and the Khan of Kalat and the KSNP leadership resigned once again. Paul Titus and Nina Swidler in their article "Knights Not Pawns: Ethno-Nationalism and Regional Dynamics in Post-Colonial Balochistan" write:

The Khan attempted to play off nationalist and sardari differences by maintaining his authority as the traditional head of the Balochi tribes while appealing to the leaders of the Balochi nation. This was not always possible, and by 1939 the activities of the nationalists had so antagonized the sardars and British that they pressured the Khan to declare KSNP illegal in Kalat State. The ban on the party was lifted after World War II, though antagonism between the sardars and nationalists remained. In March 1946, for example the Balochi activist poet Gul Khan Nasir was expelled from Kalat State following complaints to the agent to the Governor-General in Balochistan from the Badini, Jamaldini and Zagar Mengal sardars. They claimed that Nasir and other activists had created disturbances in the town of Noshki by making speeches charging that the sardars were appropriating and selling local residents' wheat rations.

== Muslim League ==
After Kalat's accession to Pakistan in 1948, the KSNP broke up. The Khan of Kalat, Ahmedyar Khan joined the Muslim League after the accession but was hesitant to do it alone so he sent Mir Ajmal Khan to Mir Ghaus Bakhsh Bizenjo and Gul Khan Nasir to persuade them into joining the Muslim League with the Khan. Both Gul Khan and Ghaus Bakhsh thought that joining the ML would provide them the platform they needed to raise the voice for Kalat's rights. But at the end they decided not to join the Muslim League..

== Usthman Gal ==
In the years that followed, Pakistan went through many changes. In 1954 the Communist Party of Pakistan was banned and then in 1955, the provinces of Pakistan's western wing were merged to form a single unit as West Pakistan under One Unit Scheme. The politicians from Balochistan, under the leadership of Ghaus Bakhsh Bizenjo, Ghaus Bakhsh Gazgi Mengal, Gul Khan Nasir, Agha Abdul Karim Khan (the brother of the Khan of Kalat), Mohammad Hussain Anqa and Qadir Bux Nizamani formed the political party "Usthman Gal" which is Balochi for "The People's Party". Agha Abdul Karim was elected as the President of this party.

== Pakistan National Party ==
In 1956, various political parties of West Pakistan including the "Usthman Gal" from Balochistan, "Khudai Khidmatgar" from N.W.F.P, "Azad Pakistan Party" from Punjab, "Sindh Mahaz" from Sindh and "Woror Pashtun" from the Pashtun dominated areas of Balochistan were merged into the Pakistan National Party. In this way, the Pakistan National Party emerged as the largest Left-Wing Political Party in West Pakistan.

== National Awami Party ==
In 1957, the PNP merged with the East Pakistani politician Maulana Bhashani's Awami League to form the National Awami Party as a nationwide political force. It was the principal opposition party to the military regime for much of the late 1950s and mid-1960s. The party split in 1969 into two factions; the head of one faction remained in newly-formed Bangladesh, while the remaining faction became the principal opposition party in the country after the 1970 Pakistani general election. The party was outlawed by Zulfikar Ali Bhutto's government in 1975 and much of its leadership was subsequently imprisoned.

=== 1958–1960 ===
During this period of Ayub Khan's rule, most of the leadership including Ghaus Bakhsh Bizenjo, Gul Khan Nasir and Faiz Muhammad Yousafzai were arrested on different charges. They were imprisoned in Quetta's Quli Camp. By the time he was released, Gul Khan couldn't even walk straight.

This was a very important period for the politics of Balochistan because it was in those years that the young and dynamic Sardar Ataullah Khan Mengal and Nawab Khair Bakhsh Marri entered Balochistan's political scene. It was also during that period that Nawab Akbar Khan Bugti was sacked from his position as the Minister of State for Interior of Pakistan and arrested. As a result of this, he also joined the NAP.

=== 1960–1970 ===
During 1960–1970, the National Awami Party or NAP presented strong resistance to the Ayub Regime and for this reason, its leaders were constantly in and out of jail. In this decade Ataullah Mengal rose to the top of the Baloch leadership because of his personality and Khair Bakhsh Marri also earned a lot of fame because of his political philosophy. Gul Khan Nasir went to jail around 5–6 times from 1962 – 1970. As a result of NAP's struggle during this decade, the One Unit was discarded and Balochistan got the status of a province.

=== 1970 elections ===
In 1970, general elections were held in Pakistan in which the NAP managed to get a majority in Balochistan and N.W.F.P while the Pakistan People's Party got most of the seats of Punjab and Sindh. Nasir won a seat in the Provincial Assembly after defeating Nabi Bakhsh Zehri of the Muslim League Qayyum group Chaghi. East Pakistan broke away from Pakistan and Bangladesh was formed because of the controversy that arose over the election's result. After the fall of East Pakistan, Bhutto wasn't willing to allow the NAP to form its governments in N.W.F.P and Balochistan. But as a result of extensive dialogue held between Z.A. Bhutto and Ghaus Bakhsh Bizenjo, NAP was able to form coalition governments in both the provinces in 1972.

=== NAP government ===
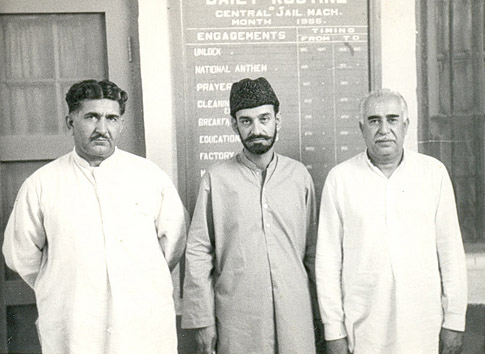
Mir Gul Khan Nasir (Left), Sardar Ataullah Mengal (Middle) and Mir Ghaus Bakhsh Bizenjo (Right)

In Balochistan Sardar Ataullah Khan Mengal was elected as the First Chief Minister of Balochistan while Mir Ghaus Bakhsh Bizenjo became the Governor. Gul Khan Nasir was a Senior Minister in this government and held the portfolios of Education, Health, Information, Social Welfare and Tourism. Later, Tourism and Information portfolios were given to other ministers. As the Minister of Education, Gul Khan managed to lay down the foundation for the Bolan Medical College which is, to this day, the only medical college in Balochistan.

During this time, differences had arisen between Nawab Akbar Khan Bugti and the rest of the NAP leaders. Bhutto, who was looking for a way to remove the NAP government, saw this and used Akbar Bugti to dismiss the NAP government. The N.W.F.P government resigned in protest. Governor's rule was imposed with Nawab AKbar Khan Bugti appointed as the Governor of Balochistan. Three months after the dismissal of the NAP government, Gul Khan Nasir was arrested on various charges before any other leader. In August 1973, Mir Gul Khan's brother, Mir Lawang Khan, died in an operation carried out by the Pakistani Military. Mir Gul Khan's younger brother, Colonel (R) Sultan Mohammad Khan (who was the head of the Balochistan Reserve Police), was arrested the day he returned to Quetta after burying Mir Lawang Khan. Along with Colonel Sultan, Ghaus Bakhsh Bizenjo, Ataullah Mengal, Khair Bakhsh Marri and Bizen Bizenjo were also arrested. Since all this happened during Akbar Bugti's regime, therefore the public sentiment was against him in Balochistan at that time. Mir Gul Khan Nasir wrote a lot of poems against Bugti during his imprisonment. Later, a commission, known as the Hyderabad tribunal, was set up and Mir Ghaus Bakhsh Bizenjo, Sardar Ataullah Mengal, Gul Khan Nasir, Nawab Marri, Khan Abdul Wali Khan, Syed Kaswar Gardezi, Habib Jalib and many others had to defend themselves in a treason case in front of the tribunal.

While in prison, differences arose between the Baloch leaders. After the ouster of Bhutto's government by General Zia-ul-Haq, negotiations for the winding up of the Hyderabad tribunal and the release of all detainees was initiated leading to their eventual release in 1979. On their release, Ghaus Bakhsh Bizenjo, Gul Khan Nasir and Ataullah Mengal brought back their followers who had taken refuge in Afghanistan while Khair Bakhsh Marri and Shero Marri, themselves, went to Afghanistan. Sardar Ataullah Mengal also left for London. Gul Khan Nasir and Ghaus Bakhsh Bizenjo joined Wali Khan's National Democratic Party.

== Pakistan National Party ==
After some time, Ghaus Bakhsh Bizenjo had a falling out with Wali Khan over the Saur Revolution of Afghanistan. Ghaus Bakhsh and Gul Khan left the NDP and formed the Pakistan National Party or PNP. Ghaus Bakhsh Bizenjo was elected as PNP's president while Gul Khan Nasir became the President of PNP Balochistan. Even though Gul Khan had joined Mir Ghaus Bakhsh's party, he was of the opinion that the Baloch should not be pushed into another term of turmoil by pitting them against the Martial Law Regime but rather they should be educated, trained, and made ready for the future conditions that might change the situation and geography of the subcontinent. But Mir Ghaus Bakhsh Bizenjo thought that Martial Law should be fought head-on to make democracy in Pakistan stronger. After the lapse of some time, Mir Gul Khan tendered his resignation and concentrated all of his abilities towards his literary work.

== Imprisonment ==
Nasir was arrested on several occasions from 1939 to 1978 on many different charges, all of them pertaining to politics. He collectively spent almost 15 years of his life in jail.

== Literary services ==
Nasir wrote poems in English, Urdu, Balochi, Brahui, and Persian. Most of his poems are in the Balochi language. He was good friends with Faiz Ahmed Faiz. Once Faiz offered to translate Mir Gul Khan's poems in Urdu but Khan turned down the offer. Most of Nasir's Urdu poetry was written between 1933–1950 and there has been no publication of his Urdu poetry to this date.

A quatrain of his goes as follows:

"Had Mir Gul Khan Nasir been born in Punjab he would've become Faiz Ahmed Faiz and if Faiz had been brought up in Balochistan, he would've become Gul Khan Nasir".

— Habib Jalib

Wáhde pa ĝaríbáñ ki jaháñ tang bibít
Láp húrak, badan lúč pa badrang bibít
Haq int ča čušeñ wár o azábeñ zindá
Máří bisučant, sar birawant, jang bibít

Translation:

When the world starts to constrict around the poor man
His mutilated naked form is left to fend for his hungry gut
Then it's better from this life of misery and torture
If war ensues, heads roll & lavish palaces are burnt to the ground

== Bibliography ==
His books include:

- Gul Baang (1951)
- History of Balochistan (1952) (Urdu) Volume 1
- History of Balochistan (1957) (Urdu) Volume 2
- Daastaan-e-Dostain o Sheereen (1964)
- Koch o Baloch (1969)
- Garand (1971)
- Balochistan Kay Sarhadi Chaapa Maar (1979)
- Seenai Keechaga (1980)
- Mashad Na Jang Naama (1981)
- Shah Latif Gusheet (1983)

== Posthumous compilations ==
- Gulgaal (1993)
- Shanblaak (1996)

== Awards ==
Gul Khan Nasir was posthumously awarded Sitara-i-Imtiaz (President's Award) in 2001 for his literary services.

In 1962, when the USSR government decided to award Faiz Ahmed Faiz with the Lenin Prize, they also wanted to present Gul Khan Nasir with the Prize but because of his (Mir Gul Khan's) differences with the Ayub Khan Regime of that time, he was not allowed to go to Moscow.

== Death ==
Soon after resigning from the leadership of PNP, Nasir's health deteriorated and he was diagnosed with lung cancer. Not having enough money, or accepting any from his relatives, he was not able to procure treatment in time. It was only after his condition became so bad that he could not leave his bed that he was taken to Karachi, where doctors, after checking him, gave him only a few days to live. He died on 6 December 1983 in the Mid East Hospital, Karachi. He was taken back to his village, Noshki, in a huge procession. On 7 December 1983 he was buried in his village's cemetery. The funeral proceedings were attended by a large number of people. Ghaus Bakhsh Bizenjo, Aalijah Ghaus Bakhsh Gazgi Mengal, Malik Faiz Miuhammad Yousafzai, and other leaders were not able to attend because they were in jail, while Nawab Akbar Bugti's movement had been restricted to Quetta. Ataullah Mengal and Khair Bakhsh Marri were abroad, in self-exile.

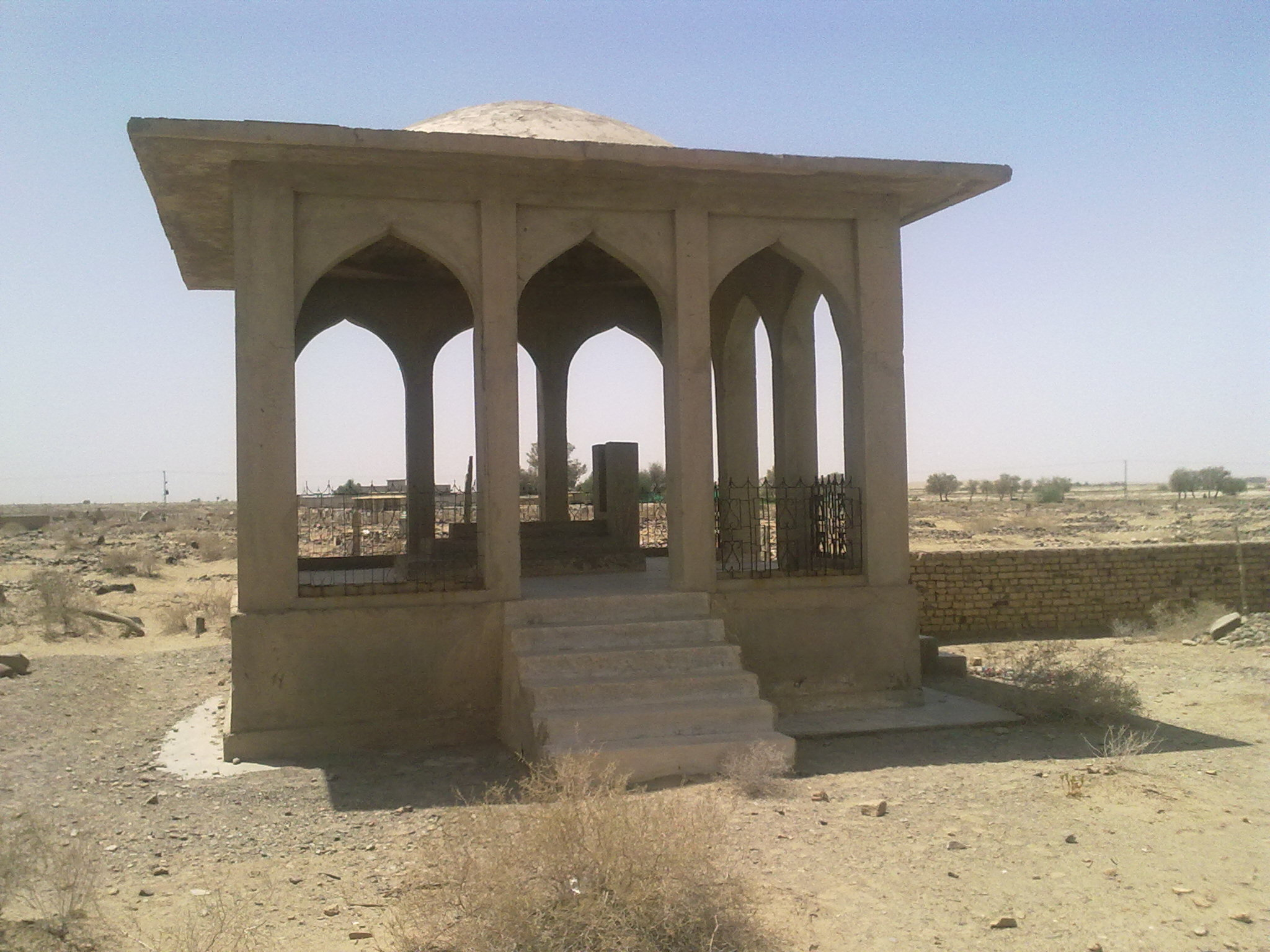
The final resting place of Gul Khan Nasir in Noshki.

== Archives ==
Five notebooks of Gul Khan Nasir's Baluchi poetry in his own hand are held by SOAS Archives (MS 380635).

== See also ==
- Balochi literature
- Nawab Akbar Bugti
- Habib Jalib
- Faiz Ahmed Faiz
- National Awami Party
- Ahmed Faraz
- Amir-ul-Mulk Mengal
- Khan Wali Khan
- Ataullah Mengal
