= National Awami Party =

Political party in East and West Pakistan

National Awami Party National People's Party
- Urdu name: نیشنل عوامی پارٹی
- Bengali name: ন্যাশনাল আওয়ামী পার্টি
- Abbreviation: NAP
- Leader: Abdul Hamid Khan Bhashani
- Founders: Abdul Hamid Khan Bhashani and Yar Mohammad Khan
- Founded: 1957; Dacca, East Pakistan, Pakistan
- Dissolved: 30 November 1967
- Merger of: APP; SM; SHC; PB; UG; KK; GD
- Succeeded by: NAP (Wali); NAP (Bhashani)
- Student wing: Democratic Students Federation
- Ideology: Communism; Democratic socialism Marxism–Leninism; Regionalism
- Political position: Left-wing

Election symbol
- Sheaf of Paddy

Party flag

The National Awami Party (NAP) was the major left-wing political party in East and West Pakistan. It was founded in 1957 in Dhaka, erstwhile East Pakistan (present-day Bangladesh), by Abdul Hamid Khan Bhashani and Yar Mohammad Khan, through the merger of various leftist and progressive political groups in Pakistan. Commonly known as the NAP, it was a major opposition party to Pakistani military regimes for much of the late 1950s and mid-1960s. In 1967, the party split into two factions.

== History ==
The NAP was founded in Dhaka in erstwhile East Pakistan by 1957.

The constituent parties in 1957 and their areas of influence were:

- The Bhashani-led faction which broke away from the Awami League
- Azad Pakistan Party a party led by Mian Iftikharuddin, Syed Kaswar Gardezi and Mahmud Ali Kasuri.
- Sindh Mahaz led by G. M. Syed and Sheikh Abdul Majid Sindhi.
- Sindh Hari Committee led by Haider Bakhsh Jatoi.
- Wrore Pukhtun (Pukhtun Brotherhood) a Balochistan-based party led by Abdul Samad Khan Achakzai and Hashim Khan Ghilzai.
- Usthman Gul (Awam Jamaat) of Balochistan led by Ghaus Bakhsh Bizenjo, Gul Khan Nasir and Prince Karim Khan of Kalat (princely state).
- Khudai Khidmatgar from North-West Frontier Province led by Khan Abdul Ghaffar Khan and Hakeem Mohammad Aslam Sanjari. Ghaffar Khan's son, Khan Abdul Wali Khan, also joined the party.
- Ganatantri Dal an East Bengali party led by Haji Mohammad Danesh of Dinajpur and Mahmud Ali of Sylhet.

The party President was Maulana Bhashani and the Secretary General was Mahmudul Huq Usmani. Mirza Mehdy Ispahani (aka Sadri Ispahani) was the treasurer. Afzal Bangash was the NAP's General Secretary in NWFP.

The National Awami Party was along with the Awami League expected to easily win the 1959 planned general elections. Its primary target was the disbanding of the One Unit scheme in West Pakistan and a fair deal for the increasingly discontented people of East Pakistan.

=== 1958 ban ===
In 1958, Ayub Khan came to power and all political parties were banned. The NAP was regarded by some as a front organization of the Communist Party of Pakistan (CPP) and it faced a harsh crackdown from the Ayub government. Hasan Nasir, NAP Office Secretary and card-carrying member of the CPP, was tortured to death in custody.

=== Revival ===
When Ayub allowed political parties again in 1962, the NAP was revived with all of its old components except the G.M. Sayed group and Ganatantri Dal.

=== Party split ===
At the end of 1967, a growing rift developed within the party, allegedly because Maulana Bhashani told his supporters to support Ayub Khan in the 1965 elections against the joint opposition nominee Fatima Jinnah. In return he was supposed to have received payoffs and favours, a fact which he never contradicted. On 30. November 1967, after a council session of the party in Rangpur, the NAP formally split into two factions:

- A pro-Chinese Maulana Bhashani-led faction
- A pro-Soviet Wali Khan-led faction

NAP (Bhashani) played an instrumental role in the secession of East Pakistan and the liberation of Bangladesh. After the death of Bhashani in 1976, his party lost much of its prominence on the Bangladeshi political scene. Many of its leaders became members of the Bangladesh Nationalist Party under the leadership of Mashiur Rahman Jadu Mia. Today, the liberal and progressive faction within the BNP is led by former NAP leaders.

After the 1971 war, the NAP (Wali) became the principal opposition party to the Zulfikar Ali Bhutto-led government of the Pakistan People's Party. The NAP (Wali) was banned after a relentless attack by the then Prime Minister Bhutto, who accused its leaders of treason and after a sham trial, the NAP was banned from Pakistani politics. The leaders of the NAP (Wali), including Khan Abdul Wali Khan, were only released during the regime of General Zia-ul-Haq.

== Political ideology ==
The NAP set the following as its main aims:

1. Defence of the sovereignty, integrity, and independence of Pakistan.
2. Non-aligned, independent foreign policy.
3. Ending of exploitation of Pakistan externally and its people internally.
4. Abolition of One Unit and reorganisation of provinces on a linguistic basis.
5. Right of adult franchise.

In July 1965, as the manifesto was amended after the party's re-emergence, the NAP declared that the system of government in the country should be based on the concept of people's sovereignty. The Party advocated the maximum provincial autonomy in a confederal structure. Only Defence and Foreign Affairs were to be left with the 'Federal' government, while other powers were to rest with the autonomous units. One-Unit in West Pakistan had to be replaced by a "regional confederation where provinces would be created on linguistic lines". In foreign affairs the Manifesto asked for non-alignment and withdrawal from the military pacts SEATO and CENTO.

== See also ==
- B. M. Kutty
- National Students Federation
- Awami National Party
- Sherbaz Khan Mazari
- Abdul Hai Baloch
- Jam Saqi
- Baloch Students Organization
