= Ataullah Mengal =

Pakistani politician (1929–2021)

Sardar Ataullah Mengal
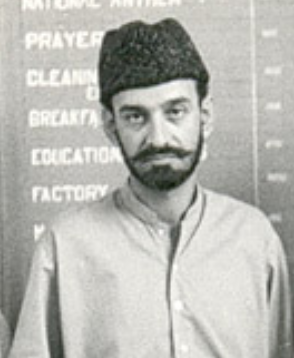

1st Chief Minister of Balochistan
- In office 1 May 1972 – 13 February 1973
- Governor: Ghaus Bakhsh Bizenjo
- Preceded by: Office established
- Succeeded by: Governor's rule Jam Ghulam Qadir Khan (after Governor's rule)

Personal details
- Born: 24 March 1929 Wadh, Kalat State, British India (Now, Wadh, Balochistan, Pakistan)
- Died: 2 September 2021 (aged 92) Karachi, Sindh, Pakistan
- Resting place: Wadh, Khuzdar District
- Party: Balochistan National Party (Mengal)
- Relations: Jam Abdul Karim Bijar (grandson)
- Children: 5, including Akhtar Mengal (son)

Ataullah Mengal (Urdu: عطاءاللہ مینگل; 24 March 1929 – 2 September 2021) was a Pakistani politician and feudal figure. He was the head of the Mengal tribe until he nominated one of his grandsons, Sardar Asad Ullah Mengal, as his tribal successor. He was also the 1st Chief Minister of Balochistan during Zulfikar Ali Bhutto's premiership from 1 May 1972 to 13 February 1973. He died on 2 September 2021 in Karachi.

== Early life and education ==
Ataullah Mengal was born on 24 March 1929 in Wadh Tehsil, then in the Kalat State of British India. He received his early education in Lasbela and later studied at Sindh Madrasatul Islam in Karachi. In 1948, he was living in the Mango Pir area of Karachi. Owing to political disputes between his father and the Khan of Kalat, an expulsion order was issued against the family, compelling Sardar Rasool Bakhsh Mengal to move to Bela in the former Lasbela State. He received his higher education at the Aitchison College.

He was declared the chief (sardar) of the Mengal tribe in 1954.

== Political career ==
Mengal was introduced to politics by Mir Ghaus Baksh Bizenjo. Bizenjo ran the election campaign of Mengal and Mengal was later elected to the West Pakistan provincial assembly in 1962. As a member of the legislature, Mengal was critical of the Ayub Khan regime and their One Unit Scheme; one of his speeches against them led to his arrest on charges of sedition.

In May 1972, he was elected to the Provincial Assembly of the Balochistan. During this time, Mengal became the first chief minister of Balochistan. During the brief tenure in office, tax reforms were instituted and a new police force was formed in Balochistan. Freedom of speech and of the press were encouraged and, in the words of Bizenjo, the governor at the time, Balochistan became "an island of freedom in a sea of political inequalities". Mengal was dismissed by the then Prime Minister Zulfikar Ali Bhutto in February 1973; one day after Bhutto took office, Mengal, Bizenjo and other local leaders were arrested by the Bhutto government.

Mengal was not released from prison until after General Muhammad Zia-ul-Haq's 1977 military coup. He chose to go into a self-exile in London during Zia-ul-Haq's rule. On 31 March 1985, he participated in the founding of Sindhi–Baloch–Pashtun Front there.

In the late 1990s, Ataullah Mengal returned to Pakistan and formed the Balochistan National Party (BNP). Mengal-led BNP emerged as one of the largest parliamentary group during the general elections in Pakistan. Mengal's son, Akhtar Mengal (b. 1962), then became the Chief Minister of Balochistan in a coalition government with support from the Jamhoori Wattan Party (JWP). Ataullah was elected in 1998 to become party chief of BNP, but the disputed results prompted the departure of several key party members.

In the 1990s, Mengal was also the head of Pakistan Oppressed Nations Movement (Ponm). In 2009, Sardar Ataullah Khan Mengal was one of many candidates considered for the position of President of Pakistan after the resignation of Pervez Musharraf. He was also considered for the post of interim prime minister in 2012 and president of Pakistan in 2013, but he declined the offers. His active participation in politics declined due to his advanced age and health issues.

== Death and burial ==
Mengal died in Karachi, Sindh on 2 September 2021 due to cardiac arrest. He had had cardiovascular disease. A Balochistan National Party (BNP) spokesman confirmed his death and announced that Mengal will be buried in his ancestral graveyard in Wadh, Khuzdar District. Many Pakistani politicians including the president of Pakistan, Arif Alvi, and the Chief Minister of Balochistan, Jam Kamal Khan, expressed their condolences over the death of the veteran Pakistani politician. The Chief Minister of Sindh, Murad Ali Shah, and the Speaker of Balochistan assembly, Mir Abdul Quddus Bizenjo, also expressed their condolences over the death of Mengal.

Pakistan Peoples Party chairman, Bilawal Bhutto Zardari, and Jamiat Ulema-e-Islam (F) chief, Fazlur Rehman, also expressed their profound grief and sorrow at the death of the veteran politician. On 3 September, his body was buried in his native town Wadh in Khuzdar District of Balochistan.

== See also ==
- Mengal
- Khan Wali Khan
- Mir Gul Khan Naseer
- Mir Ghaus Baksh Bizenjo
- National Awami Party
- Balochistan National Party
- List of political parties in Pakistan

Political offices
| Preceded by Post created | Chief Minister of Balochistan; 1972–1973 | Succeeded by Jam Ghulam Qadir Khan |
