= Government of East Pakistan =

Defunct government of Pakistan

- পূর্ব পাকিস্তান সরকার حکومتِ مشرقی پاکستان
- Emblem (1970–1971)

Overview
- Established: 1947
- Dissolved: 1971
- State: Dominion of Pakistan (1947–1955); Islamic Republic of Pakistan (1955–1971)
- Leader: Chief Minister
- Appointed by: President of Pakistan
- Main organ: Cabinet of East Pakistan
- Responsible to: East Pakistan Provincial Assembly
- Headquarters: East Pakistan Secretariat, Dacca

The Government of East Pakistan or formerly Government of East Bengal governed the province East Bengal (later East Pakistan, now Bangladesh) and was centered in its provincial capital Dhaka. The head of the province was the Governor, who was nominated by the President of Pakistan. While the head of the province of East Pakistan was the Chief Minister who was elected by the East Pakistan Provincial Assembly.

The East Pakistani government was dominated by the Awami League. It was succeeded by the Government of Bangladesh following the province's secession in 1971.

== Cabinets ==
=== Haque Ministry ===
Awami League accepted A.K. Fazlul Haque of Krishak Sramik Party as the Chief Minister of the province in the Parliamentary meeting on 2 April 1954, forced by Chaudhry Khaliquzzaman, the then governor of East Bengal, to form the provincial government. However, on the same day, without consulting the provincial council meeting, Haque announced three persons as ministers of the province according to his own wish. Awami League, the majority party of the United Front, could not accept this.

On the 30th of the same month, Haque's speech in Calcutta, India highlighted the similarity between the two Bengals, which drew criticism in Pakistan. Under the pressure of criticism, Haque announced the names of 10 more ministers to improve relations with Awami League, 7 of whom were members of Awami League. However, on May 30, the central government dissolved the United Front cabinet and imposed Governor's rule in East Bengal.

=== Sarker Ministry ===
After the removal of Governor's rule on 5 June 1955, the Krishak Sramik Party and the Awami League formed the next cabinet. Although he announced his retirement from politics on 24 July 1954, on 11 August 1955 A.K. Fazlul Haque became the Home Minister and Abu Hussain Sarkar was the Chief Minister of the new cabinet. In the session of the Provincial Council dated 13 August 1956, Sheikh Mujibur Rahman moved a motion of no confidence against the Second United Front Cabinet. However, on August 14, when A.K. Fazlul Haque, Governor of East Pakistan, announced the suspension of the session of the Provincial Council for an indefinite period, the Awami League started a movement against the governor.

On August 15, three cabinet ministers resigned. In the face of strong protests, the Governor convened a session of the East Pakistan Provincial Council on 26 August. On 4 September 1956, after East Pakistan Rifles fired at an Awami League rally, killing 4 people and injuring several others, protests broke out in Dhaka in response. In such a situation, Section 144 was issued and the leaders of Krishak Sramik Party went into hiding.

=== Khan Ministry ===
In view of the events of September 1956, the governor ordered the Awami League to form a cabinet. On 5 September 1956, the Awami League in East Pakistan formed the second ministry in the province. This ministry, which lasted for about two years, was abolished on 24 September 1958. At that time, Sheikh Mujibur Rahman was simultaneously a member of the working committee of Awami League and the Minister of Industries of East Pakistan, which was against the constitution of Awami League. So he resigned from the post of Minister of Industry. As Abdul Hamid Khan Bhashani resigned from Awami League and formed the National Awami Party, a section of Awami League members joined Bhasani's party. In March 1957, Governor Haque amended the law to reduce the no confidence vote from 130 to 104.

On March 21, 1958, two days after 11 Awami League leaders left the party, the Abu Hossain government moved a motion of no confidence against the Khan cabinet. However, the no-confidence motion was rejected due to lack of sufficient votes. AK Fazlul Haque dismissed the Khan cabinet and installed a new cabinet of the Abu Hussain Sarker on 31 March, but the Khan cabinet was reinstated on the same day after Haque was dismissed by Feroz Khan Noon's administration. On 19 June 1958, Ataur Rahman Khan's cabinet fell due to a no-confidence motion. Abu Hussain Sarker's ministry was ousted by a no-confidence vote on the day it formed the ministry on June 20. After Ataur Rahman Khan's cabinet came to power, governor's rule was imposed in the province on June 25 for 2 months.

== Governance ==
After absorption into the Dominion of Pakistan, the province of East Pakistan (former East Bengal) was administered by a ceremonial Governor and an indirectly elected Chief Minister. During the year from May 1954 to August 1955, executive powers were exercised by the Governor and there was no Chief Minister.

== Governor ==
Political Party

Muslim League
Krishak Sramik Party
Independent
- Military Governor
  - Pakistan Army
  - Pakistan Navy

Legend

Acting Governor
Functioned and exercised power as Governor by the order of president without being appointed as one

=== Governors of East Bengal ===
List of Governors of East Bengal
#	Portrait	Governor	Term of office			Political Party	Governor General/ President
#	Portrait	Governor	Term start	Term end	Time in office	Political Party	Governor General/ President
1		Sir Frederick Chalmers Bourne (1891-1977)	15 August 1947	5 April 1950	2 years, 233 days	Independent (British Administrator)	Muhammad Ali Jinnah Khawaja Nazimuddin
[-]		Justice A.S.M. Akram (Acting) (Note: A.S.M. Akram was appointed Acting Governor during the leave of absence of Sir Frederick Chalmers Bourne) (1888-1968)	16 March 1949	25 April 1949	40 days	Independent	Khawaja Nazimuddin
2		Sir Feroz Khan Noon (1893-1970)	5 April 1950	26 March 1953	2 years, 355 days	Muslim League	Khawaja Nazimuddin Malik Ghulam Muhammad
[-]		Abdur Rahman Siddiqui (Acting) (Note: Abdur Rahman Siddiqui was appointed Acting Governor during the leave of absence of Sir Feroz Khan Noon) (1887-1953)	25 July 1952	10 November 1952	108 days	Muslim League	Malik Ghulam Muhammad
3		Chaudhry Khaliquzzaman (1889-1973)	4 April 1953	30 May 1954 (Note: With the dismissal of the United Front Ministry in East Bengal, Governor General Malik Ghulam Muhammad decided to enforce Governor's Rule in the province and appointed Iskander Mirza as Governor)	1 year, 56 days	Muslim League	Malik Ghulam Muhammad
4		Iskander Mirza (1899-1969)	30 May 1954	21 September 1954	114 days	Muslim League	Malik Ghulam Muhammad
[-]		Justice Sir Thomas Hobart Ellis (Acting) (Note: Sir Thomas Hobart Ellis was appointed Acting Governor when Iskander Mirza was taken into the central cabinet as Minister) (1894-1981)	Appointment: 21 September 1954 Sworn in: 25 October 1954	22 December 1954	92 days	Independent	Malik Ghulam Muhammad
[-]		Justice Muhammad Shahabuddin (Acting) (Note: Muhammad Shahabuddin was appointed after Acting Governor after Sir Thomas Hobart Ellis) (1895-1971)	22 December 1954	14 June 1955 (Note: Justice Shahabuddin resigned due to differences of opinion about the restoration of parliamentary government in East Bengal)	174 days	Independent	Malik Ghulam Muhammad
[-]		Justice Amiruddin Ahmad (Acting) (Note: Justice Amiruddin Ahmad, Chief Justice of Dhaka High Court, was appointed acting Governor on the resignation of Justice Muhammad Shahabuddin) (1895-1965)	14 June 1955	As Governor of East Bengal: 14 October 1955 As Governor of East Pakistan: 9 March 1956	As Governor of East Bengal: 122 days As Governor of Eastern Wing: 269 days	Independent	Malik Ghulam Muhammad Iskander Mirza

=== Governors of East Pakistan ===
In late 1955, the prime minister Mohammad Ali Bogra initiated the One Unit policy which resulted in East Bengal province being renamed to East Pakistan.

List of Governors of East Pakistan
#	Portrait	Governor	Term of office			Political Party	President
#	Portrait	Governor	Term start	Term end	Time in office	Political Party	President
[-]		Justice Amiruddin Ahmad (Acting) (Note: Justice Amiruddin Ahmad, Chief Justice of Dhaka High Court, was appointed acting Governor on the resignation of Justice Muhammad Shahabuddin) (1895-1965)	As Governor of East Pakistan: 14 October 1955 As Governor of East Bengal: June 14, 1955	9 March 1956	As Governor of East Pakistan: 147 days As Governor of Eastern Wing : 269 days	Independent	Iskander Mirza
1		Sher-e-Bangla A. K. Fazlul Huq (1873 - 1962)	9 March 1956	31 March 1958 (Note: President Iskander Mirza removed A. K. Fazlul Huq as governor on 31 March 1958 on the advice of the Noon cabinet for allegedly overstepping his limits as a constitutional Governor. Huq had dismissed Ataur Rahman's Ministry of Awami League that had not been defeated on the floor of the House, and had installed Mr. Abu Hussain Sarkar of his own party Krishak Sramik Party as Chief Minister.)	2 years, 22 days	Krishak Sramik Party	Iskander Mirza
[-]		Muhammad Hamid Ali (Acting) (Note: Muhammad Hamid Ali, Chief Secretary to the Governor of East Pakistan, was appointed Acting Governor in pursuance of the provisions of Article 70 of the Constitution following the removal of Sher-e-Bangla A. K. Fazlul Huq from the office) (1906-1972)	1 April 1958	3 May 1958	32 days	Independent	Iskander Mirza
2		Sultanuddin Ahmad (1902-1977)	Appointment: 26 April 1958 Sworn in: 3 May 1958	10 October 1958 (Note: Sultanuddin Ahmad was removed from office on 10 October 1958 soon after the promulgation of Martial Law in Pakistan on 7 October)	160 days	Independent	Iskander Mirza
3		Zakir Husain (1898-1971)	Appointment: 10 October 1958 Sworn in: 11 October 1958	14 April 1960	1 year, 186 days	Independent	Iskander Mirza Ayub Khan
4		Lieutenant general Azam Khan, PA (1908-1994)	15 April 1960	10 May 1962	2 years, 25 days	Military	Ayub Khan
[-]		Syed Hashim Raza (Acting) (Note: Syed Hashim Raza was Acting Governor of the province during the absence of General Azam Khan's official visit to West Germany) (1910-2003)	1 July 1961	5 August 1961	35 days	Independent	Ayub Khan
5		Ghulam Faruque Khan (1899-1992)	11 May 1962	25 October 1962 (Note: Unable to cope with the political problems of East Pakistan, Ghulam Faruque Khan resigned from office.)	167 days	Independent	Ayub Khan
6		Abdul Monem Khan (1899-1971)	28 October 1962	23 March 1969	6 years, 146 days (Longest Serving)	Muslim League	Ayub Khan
7		Mirza Nurul Huda (1919-1991)	23 March 1969	25 March 1969 (Note: With the promulgation of Martial Law throughout Pakistan and the abrogation of the constitution in the evening of 25 March, Mirza Nurul Huda's tenure of governorship came to an abrupt end after just 60 hours.)	2 days	Independent	Ayub Khan
8		Major general Muzaffaruddin, PA (Note: On 25 March 1969 General A. M. Yahya Khan proclaimed martial law and divided the country into two administrative zones- West Pakistan (Zone 'A') and East Pakistan (Zone 'B'). Major general Muzaffaruddin was the GOC of the 14 Division, became Martial Law Administrator, Zone 'B'. On 8 April 1969, Yahya Khan issued an order directing that the Martial Law Administrators of Zone 'A' and 'B' would perform the functions and powers of the Governors of West and East Pakistan respectively. Thus Major general Muzaffaruddin became Martial Law Administrator and also exercised the powers and functions of Governor of East Pakistan.) (Martial Law Administrator)	25 March 1969	23 August 1969	151 days	Military	Yahya Khan
9		Lieutenant general Sahabzada Yaqub Khan, PA (Note: Lieutenant general Sahabzada Yaqub Khan was appointed as Martial Law Administrator of Zone 'B' and exercised the powers and functions of the Governor of East Pakistan.) (1920-2016) (Martial Law Administrator)	23 August 1969	1 September 1969 (Note: On 8 April 1969, President Yahya Khan issued an order directing that the Martial Law Administrators would perform the functions and powers of the Governor. However, a notification issued by the cabinet secretariat on 1 September 1969 cancelled the order of 8 April 1969 and directed Martial Law Administrators to refrain from performing the functions of Governor in their respective provinces with immediate effect. Lt. General Yaqub Khan remained Martial Law Administrator until Vice Admiral S. M. Ahsan took over as the new Governor of East Pakistan on 1 September 1969)	9 days	Military	Yahya Khan
10		Vice admiral Syed Mohammad Ahsan, PN (1921-1989)	1 September 1969	1 March 1971	1 year, 181 days	Military	Yahya Khan
(11)		Lieutenant general Sahabzada Yaqub Khan, PA (Note: Lt. general Sahabzada Yaqub Khan was made the "head of civil administration in the province" and exercised the functions and powers of Governor from 1 March 1971 until the arrival of Lt. general Tikka Khan on 7 March 1971.) (1920-2016) (Head of Civil Administration )	1 March 1971	7 March 1971	6 days	Military	Yahya Khan
12		Lieutenant general Tikka Khan, PA (1915-2002)	Appointment: 6 March 1971 Sworn in: 7 March 1971 Officially announced: 9 March 1971	3 September 1971	180 days	Military	Yahya Khan
13		Abdul Motaleb Malik (1905-1977)	Appointment: 31 August 1971 Sworn in: 3 September 1971	14 December 1971 (Note: Abdul Motaleb Malik along with his cabinet resigned on 14 December after realizing that Pakistani defeat was imminent and sought refuse in Hotel Intercontinental, seeking the protection of the Red Cross flag.)	102 days	Muslim League	Yahya Khan
14		Lieutenant general A. A. K. Niazi, PA (Note: Lt. general A. A. K. Niazi was the commander of the Eastern Command of the Pakistan Army and as the supreme authority of Pakistan in its eastern wing functioned and exercised power as the Governor of East Pakistan after the resignation of Abdul Motaleb Malik during the last 48 hours of Bangladesh Liberation War) (1915-2004) (Supreme Authority of East Pakistan)	14 December 1971	16 December 1971	2 days	Military	Yahya Khan

== Chief ministers ==
Political Party

Muslim League
Krishak Sramik Party
United Front
Awami League

No.	Portrait	Name	Term of office			Political Party	Governor	Governor-General/ President
No.	Portrait	Name	Term start	Term end	Time in office	Political Party	Governor	Governor-General/ President
1		Sir Khawaja Nazimuddin (1894 – 1964)	August 15, 1947	September 14, 1948	1 year, 20 days	Muslim League	Sir Frederick Chalmers Bourne	Muhammad Ali Jinnah
2		Nurul Amin (1893 – 1974)	September 14, 1948	April 3, 1954	5 years, 201 days	Muslim League	Sir Feroz Khan Noon	Sir Khawaja Nazimuddin Malik Ghulam Muhammad
3		Sher-e-Bangla; A. K. Fazlul Huq (1873 - 1962)	April 3, 1954	May 29, 1954	56 days	United Front	Chaudhry Khaliquzzaman	Malik Ghulam Muhammad
[-]		Vacant (Governor's rule)	May 29, 1954	June 6, 1955	1 year, 22 days	N/A	-	Malik Ghulam Muhammad
4		Abu Hussain Sarkar (1894 - 1969)	June 6, 1955	August 30, 1956	1 year, 71 days	Krishak Sramik Party	Iskander Mirza Sir Thomas Hobart Ellis (Acting) Muhammad Shahabuddin (Acting)	Malik Ghulam Muhammad Iskander Mirza
5		Ataur Rahman Khan (1907 - 1991)	September 1, 1956	March 31, 1958	1 year, 211 days	Awami League	Amiruddin Ahmad (Acting) Sher-e-Bangla; A. K. Fazlul Huq	Iskander Mirza
(4)		Abu Hussain Sarkar (1894 - 1969)	March 31, 1958	April 1, 1958	1 day	Krishak Sramik Party	Sher-e-Bangla; A. K. Fazlul Huq Muhammad Hamid Ali (Acting)	Iskander Mirza
(5)		Ataur Rahman Khan (1907 - 1991)	April 1, 1958	June 18, 1958	78 days	Awami League	Muhammad Hamid Ali (Acting) Sultanuddin Ahmad	Iskander Mirza
(4)		Abu Hussain Sarkar (1894 - 1969)	June 18, 1958	June 22, 1958	4 days	Krishak Sramik Party	Sultanuddin Ahmad	Iskander Mirza
[-]		Vacant (Governor's rule)	June 22, 1958	August 25, 1958	64 days	N/A	-	Iskander Mirza
(5)		Ataur Rahman Khan (1907 - 1991)	August 25, 1958	October 7, 1958	43 days	Awami League	Sultanuddin Ahmad	Iskander Mirza

== Legislature ==
East Pakistan's provincial assembly consisted of 300 members. It was known as the East Bengal Assembly from 1947 to 1955 when the provincial name was changed. The legislature was a successor to the Bengal Legislative Council and the Bengal Legislative Assembly, which were divided between East Bengal and West Bengal during the partition of Bengal in 1947. It was the largest provincial legislature in Pakistan.

== Judiciary ==
The High Court of judicature for East Bengal commonly known as the Dhaka High Court was established in 1947 under Pakistan (Provisional Constitutional) Order 1947 as a separate High Court with all Appellate, Civil and Original jurisdictions. In 1955 the Dhaka High Court became the High Court of East Pakistan and the Supreme Court of Pakistan was established as the apex Court with the appellate jurisdiction to hear the decisions of the High Courts established in the East and West Pakistan. Until 1967 the High Court was held in the building that now known as the Old High Court Building on Kazi Nazrul Islam Avenue, opposite the curzon hall, Dhaka. With the construction of a larger facility in the 1960s nearby that now houses the Supreme Court of Bangladesh and Attorney General's office, the High Court was shifted from Old House on 10 July 1967.

== Furthur reading ==
- Al Saeed, Abu (2019). আওয়ামী লীগের শাসনকাল [১৯৫৬-৫৮ এবং ১৯৭১-৭৫] [Awami League rule (1956-58 and 1971-75)] (in Bengali). Dhaka: Agami Prokashoni. ISBN 9789840421596.
