= East Pakistan =

Former provincial wing of Pakistan (1956–1971)

East Pakistan পূর্ব পাকিস্তান (Bengali) مشرقی پاکستان (Urdu)
- 1956–1971
- Emblem (1970-1971)
- Anthem: Torana-i-Pakistan
- Location of Bangladesh (then East Pakistan) in green and present-day Pakistan (then the Western wing of Pakistan) in light green
- Status: Administrative unit of Pakistan
- Capital and largest city: Dacca
- Official languages: Bengali; English
- Native languages: Chakma; Tripuri; Marma; Tanchangya
- Demonyms: Bengali; East Pakistani; Pakistani
- Government: Self-governing wing subject to the federal government
- Chief Ministers
  - 1955–1956, 1958: Abu Hussain Sarkar
  - 1956–1958, 1958: Ataur Rahman Khan
- Governors
  - 1955–1956: Amiruddin Ahmad
  - 1956–1958: A. K. Fazlul Huq
  - 1958–1960: Zakir Husain
  - 1960–1962: Azam Khan
  - 1962: Ghulam Faruque Khan
  - 1962–1969: Abdul Monem Khan
  - 1969: Mirza Nurul Huda
  - 1969, 1971: Lt. Gen. Sahabzada Yaqub Khan
  - 1969–1971: Vice Admiral S. M. Ahsan
  - 1971: Lt. Gen. Tikka Khan
  - 1971: Lt. Gen. A. A. K. Niazi
  - 1971: Abdul Motaleb Malik
- Legislature: Provincial Assembly
- History
  - Establishment: 29 February 1956
  - Legal Framework Order: 1 July 1970
  - Disestablished: 16 December 1971

Area
  - Total: 148,460 km^{2} (57,320 sq mi)

Population
  - 1951 census: 44,251,826
- Currency: Pakistani rupee
- Time zone: UTC+06:00
Preceded by	Succeeded by
East Bengal	Provisional Government of Bangladesh
- Today part of: Bangladesh (Note: See territorial exchanges between Bangladesh and India (India–Bangladesh enclaves).)

East Pakistan (Note: Bengali: পূর্ব পাকিস্তান, romanised: Purbô Pakistan, pronounced [ˈpuɾboˑ ˈpakistan]; Urdu: مشرقی پاکستان, romanised: Maśriqī Pākistān, pronounced [məʃɾɪqiː paːkɪstaːn]) was the eastern province of Pakistan between 1956 and 1971, restructured and renamed from the province of East Bengal and covering the territory of the modern country of Bangladesh. Its land borders were with India and Burma (now Myanmar), with a coastline on the Bay of Bengal. To distinguish this region from India's state West Bengal (which is also known as "Indian Bengal"), East Pakistan was known as "Pakistani Bengal". East Pakistanis were popularly known as "Pakistani Bengalis". In 1971, East Pakistan became the newly independent state Bangladesh, which means "country of Bengal", or "country of Bengalis", or "land of Bengalis" in the Bengali language.

East Pakistan was formed with West Pakistan at the reorganisation of the One Unit Scheme orchestrated by the 3rd prime minister of Pakistan, Mohammad Ali. The Constitution of Pakistan of 1956 replaced the Pakistani monarchy with an Islamic republic. Bengali politician H.S. Suhrawardy served as the prime minister of Pakistan between 1956 and 1957 and a Bengali bureaucrat Iskander Mirza became the first president of Pakistan. The 1958 Pakistani coup d'état brought General Ayub Khan to power. Khan replaced Mirza as president and launched a crackdown against pro-democracy leaders. Khan enacted the Constitution of Pakistan of 1962 which ended universal suffrage. By 1966, Sheikh Mujibur Rahman emerged as the preeminent opposition leader in Pakistan and launched the six-point movement for autonomy and democracy. The 1969 uprising in East Pakistan contributed to Ayub Khan's overthrow. Another general, Yahya Khan, usurped the presidency and enacted martial law. In 1970, Yahya Khan organised Pakistan's first federal general election. The Awami League emerged as the single largest party, followed by the Pakistan Peoples Party. The military junta stalled in accepting the results, leading to civil disobedience, the Bangladesh Liberation War, 1971 Bangladesh genocide and persecution of Biharis.

The East Pakistan Provincial Assembly was the legislative body of the territory, it was the largest provincial legislature in Pakistan and elections were held only twice in 1954 and 1970. During the Bangladesh Liberation War in 1971, most Bengali members elected to the Pakistani National Assembly and the East Pakistani provincial assembly became members of the Constituent Assembly of Bangladesh.

Due to the strategic importance of East Pakistan, the Pakistani union was a member of the Southeast Asia Treaty Organization. The economy of East Pakistan grew at an average of 2.6% between 1960 and 1965. The federal government invested more funds and foreign aid in West Pakistan, even though East Pakistan generated a major share of exports. However, President Ayub Khan did implement significant industrialisation in East Pakistan. The Kaptai Dam was built in 1965, and the Eastern Refinery was established in Chittagong. Dacca was declared as the second capital of Pakistan and planned as the home of the national parliament. The government recruited American architect Louis Kahn to design the national assembly complex in Dacca.

== History ==
=== One Unit and Islamic Republic ===
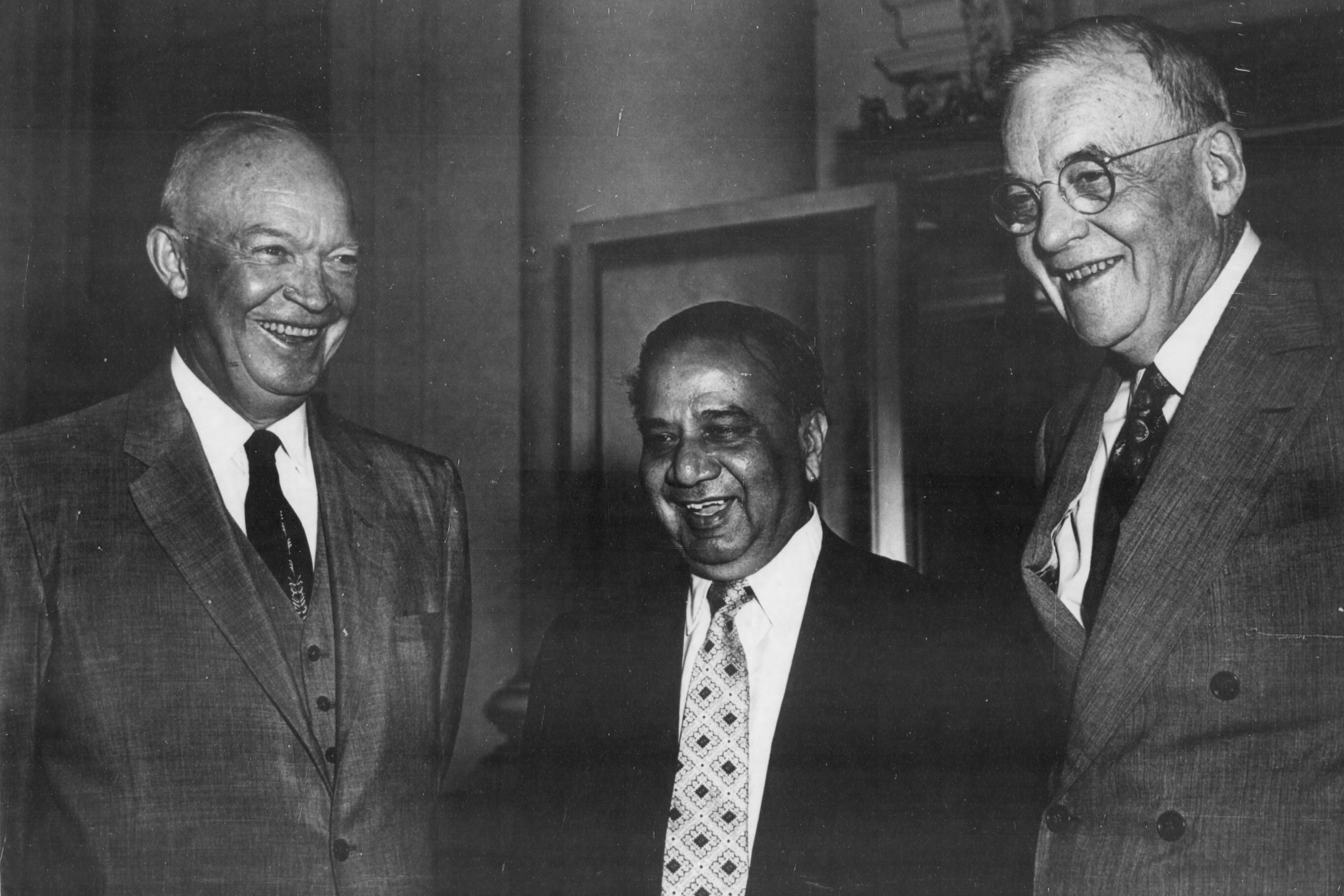
Suhrawardy (middle) with US President Dwight D. Eisenhower and Secretary of State John Foster Dulles

In 1955, Prime Minister Mohammad Ali Bogra implemented the One Unit scheme which merged the four western provinces into a single unit called West Pakistan by the Establishment of West Pakistan Act, 1955 while East Bengal was renamed as East Pakistan by the 1956 Constitution of Pakistan.

Pakistan ended its dominion status and adopted a republican constitution in 1956, which proclaimed an Islamic republic. The populist leader H. S. Suhrawardy of East Pakistan was appointed prime minister of Pakistan. As soon as he became the prime minister, Suhrawardy initiated legal work reviving the joint electorate system. There was strong opposition and resentment to the joint electorate system in West Pakistan. The Muslim League had taken the cause to the public and began calling for the implementation of a separate electorate system. In contrast to West Pakistan, the joint electorate was highly popular in East Pakistan. The tug of war with the Muslim League to establish the appropriate electorate caused problems for his government.

Efforts leading to centralising the economy were met with great resistance in West Pakistan when the elite monopolist and the business community angrily refused to adhere to his policies. The business community in Karachi began its political struggle to undermine any attempts of financial distribution of the US$10 million ICA aid to the better part of East Pakistan and to set up a consolidated national shipping corporation. In the financial cities of West Pakistan, such as Karachi, Lahore, Quetta, and Peshawar, a series of major labour strikes against the economic policies of Suhrawardy were supported by the elite business community and the private sector.

Furthermore, in order to divert attention from the controversial One Unit Program, Prime Minister Suhrawardy tried to end the crisis by calling a small group of investors to set up small businesses in the country. Despite many initiatives and holding off the NFC Award Program, Suhrawardy's political position and image deteriorated in the four provinces in West Pakistan. Many nationalist leaders and activists of the Muslim League were dismayed by the suspension of the constitutionally obliged NFC Program. His critics and Muslim League leaders observed that with the suspension of the NFC Award Program, Suhrawardy tried to give more financial allocations, aids, grants, and opportunities to East Pakistan than West Pakistan, including West Pakistan's four provinces. During the last days of his Prime ministerial years, Suhrawardy tried to remove the economic disparity between the Eastern and Western wings of the country but to no avail. He also tried unsuccessfully to alleviate the food shortage in the country.

Suhrawardy strengthened relations with the United States by reinforcing Pakistani membership in the Central Treaty Organization and the Southeast Asia Treaty Organization. Suhrawardy also promoted relations with the People's Republic of China.

=== Era of Ayub Khan ===
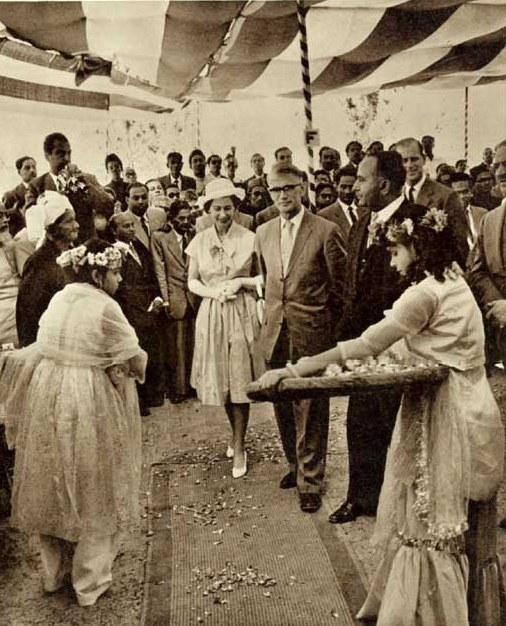
Elizabeth II, seen here visiting Chittagong in 1961, was Pakistan's Queen until 1956.

In 1958, President Iskandar Mirza enacted martial law as part of a military coup by the Pakistan Army's chief Ayub Khan. Roughly after two weeks, President Mirza's relations with Pakistan Armed Forces deteriorated leading Army Commander General Ayub Khan relieving the president from his presidency and forcefully exiling President Mirza to the United Kingdom. General Ayub Khan justified his actions after appearing on national radio declaring that: "the armed forces and the people demanded a clean break with the past...". Until 1962, the martial law continued while Field Marshal Ayub Khan purged a number of politicians and civil servants from the government and replaced them with military officers. Ayub called his regime a "revolution to clean up the mess of black marketing and corruption". Khan replaced Mirza as president and became the country's strongman for eleven years. Martial law continued until 1962 when the government of Field Marshal Ayub Khan commissioned a constitutional bench under Chief Justice of Pakistan Muhammad Shahabuddin, composed of ten senior justices, each five from East Pakistan and five from West Pakistan. On 6 May 1961, the commission sent its draft to President Ayub Khan. He thoroughly examined the draft while consulting with his cabinet.

In January 1962, the cabinet finally approved the text of the new constitution, promulgated by President Ayub Khan on 1 March 1962, which came into effect on 8 June 1962. Under the 1962 constitution, Pakistan became a presidential republic. Universal suffrage was abolished in favour of a system dubbed 'Basic Democracy'. Under the system, an electoral college would be responsible for electing the president and national assembly. The 1962 constitution created a gubernatorial system in West and East Pakistan. Each province ran its own separate provincial gubernatorial governments. The constitution defined a division of powers between the central government and the provinces. Fatima Jinnah received strong support in East Pakistan during her failed bid to unseat Ayub Khan in the 1965 presidential election.

Dacca was declared as the second capital of Pakistan in 1962. It was designated as the legislative capital and Louis Kahn was tasked with designing a national assembly complex. Dacca's population increased in the 1960s. Seven natural gas fields were tapped in the province. The petroleum industry developed as the Eastern Refinery was established in the port city of Chittagong.

=== Six Points ===
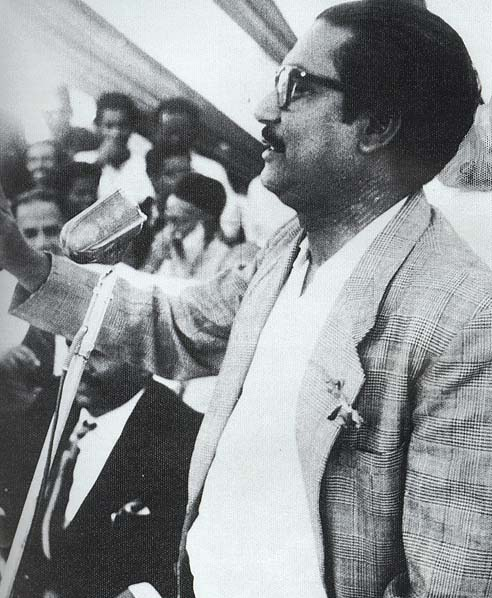
Sheikh Mujibur Rahman announcing the Six Points

In 1966, Awami League leader Sheikh Mujibur Rahman announced the six-point movement in Lahore. The movement demanded greater provincial autonomy and the restoration of democracy in Pakistan. Mujibur Rahman was indicted for treason during the Agartala Conspiracy Case after launching the six-point movement. He was later released in the 1969 uprising in East Pakistan. Ayub Khan resigned in March 1969. Below includes the historical six points:

- The Constitution should provide for a Federation of Pakistan in its true sense based on the Lahore Resolution, and the parliamentary form of government with supremacy of a Legislature directly elected on the basis of universal adult franchise.
- The federal government should deal with only two subjects: Defence and Foreign Affairs, and all other residual subjects should be vested in the federating states.
- Two separate, but freely convertible currencies for two wings should be introduced; or if this is not feasible, there should be one currency for the whole country, but effective constitutional provisions should be introduced to stop the flight of capital from East to West Pakistan. Furthermore, a separate Banking Reserve should be established and separate fiscal and monetary policy be adopted for East Pakistan.
- The power of taxation and revenue collection should be vested in the federating units and the federal centre would have no such power. The federation would be entitled to a share in the state taxes to meet its expenditures.
- There should be two separate accounts for the foreign exchange earnings of the two wings; the foreign exchange requirements of the federal government should be met by the two wings equally or in a ratio to be fixed; indigenous products should move free of duty between the two wings, and the constitution should empower the units to establish trade links with foreign countries.
- East Pakistan should have a separate military or paramilitary force, and Navy headquarters should be in East Pakistan.

=== Final years ===
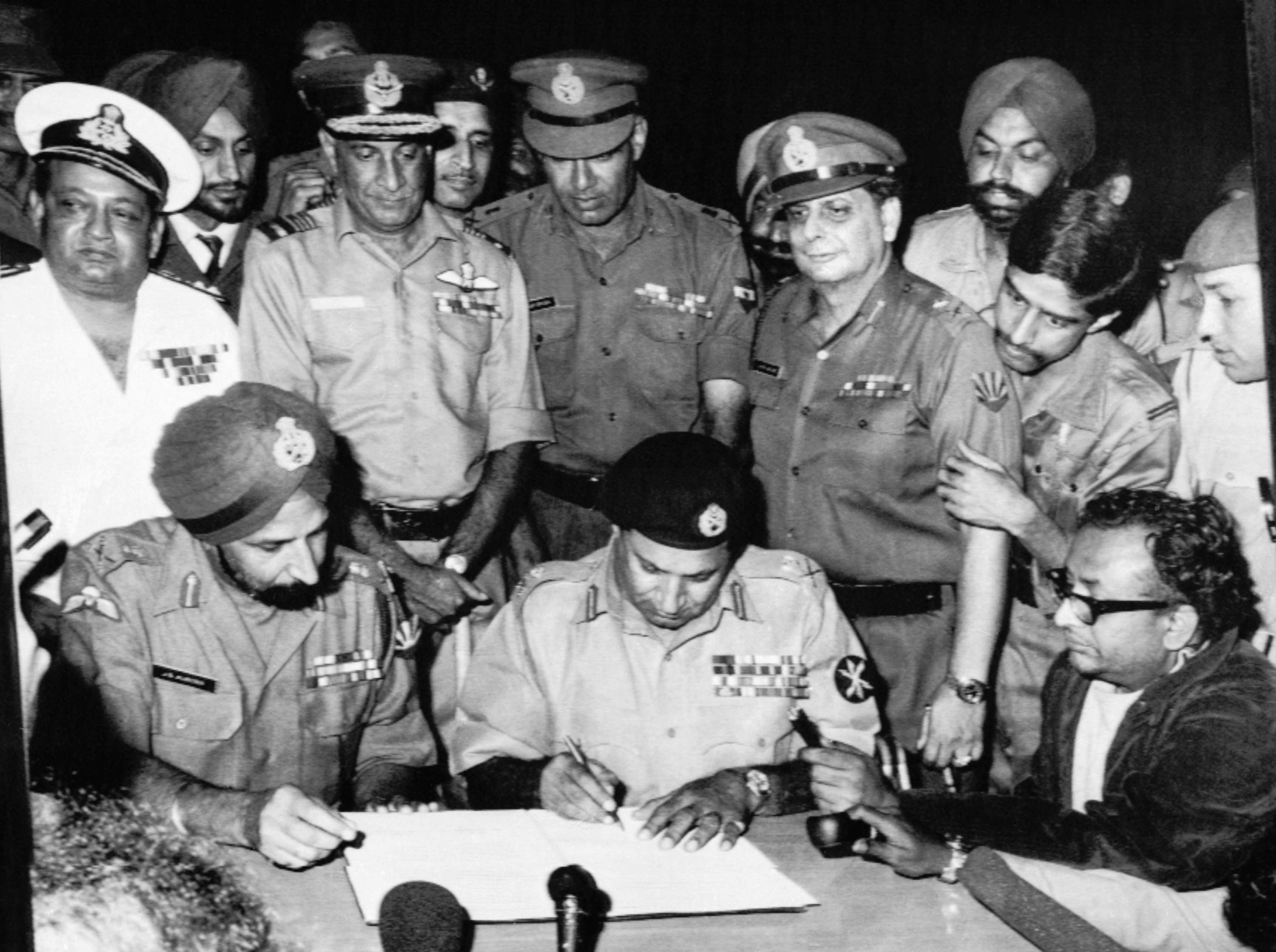
Surrender of Pakistan in December 1971

Muhammad Ayub Khan was replaced by general Yahya Khan who became the chief martial law administrator. Khan organised the 1970 Pakistani general election. The 1970 Bhola cyclone was one of the deadliest natural disasters of the 20th century. The cyclone claimed half a million lives. The disastrous effects of the cyclone caused huge resentment against the federal government. After a decade of military rule, East Pakistan was a hotbed of Bengali nationalism. There were open calls for self-determination.

When the federal general election was held, the Awami League emerged as the single largest party in the Pakistani parliament. The League won 167 out of 169 seats in East Pakistan, thereby crossing the half way mark of 150 in the 300-seat National Assembly of Pakistan. In theory, this gave the League the right to form a government under the Westminster tradition. But the League failed to win a single seat in West Pakistan, where the Pakistan Peoples Party emerged as the single largest party with 81 seats. The military junta stalled the transfer of power and conducted prolonged negotiations with the League. A civil disobedience movement erupted across East Pakistan demanding the convening of parliament. Mujibur Rahman announced a struggle for independence from Pakistan during a speech on 7 March 1971 and called for a non-cooperation movement from the Bengali populace. Between 7–26 March, East Pakistan was virtually under the popular control of the Awami League. On Pakistan's Republic Day on 23 March 1971, the first flag of Bangladesh was hoisted in many East Pakistani households. Pakistan Army was ordered to immediately launch a crackdown on 26 March whose purpose was to curb the resistance, some of these operations include Operation Searchlight and the 1971 Dhaka University massacre. This led to the Bangladeshi Declaration of Independence.

As the Bangladesh Liberation War and the 1971 Bangladesh genocide continued for nine months, East Pakistani military units like the East Bengal Regiment and the East Pakistan Rifles defected and formed the Bangladesh Forces. The Provisional Government of Bangladesh allied with neighbouring India which intervened in the final two weeks of the war and secured the surrender of Pakistan's eastern command.

==== Role of the Pakistani military ====
With Ayub Khan ousted from office in 1969, Commander of the Pakistani Army, General Yahya Khan became the country's second ruling chief martial law administrator. Both Bhutto and Mujib strongly disliked General Khan, but patiently endured him and his government as he had promised to hold an election in 1970. During this time, strong nationalistic sentiments in East Pakistan were perceived by the Pakistani Armed Forces and the central military government. Therefore, Khan and his military government wanted to divert the nationalistic threats and violence against non-East Pakistanis. The Eastern Command was under constant pressure from the Awami League and requested an active-duty officer to control the command under such extreme pressure. The high flag rank officers, junior officers, and many high command officers from Pakistan's Armed Forces were highly cautious about their appointment in East-Pakistan, and the assignment of governing East Pakistan and appointment of an officer was considered highly difficult for the Pakistan High Military Command.

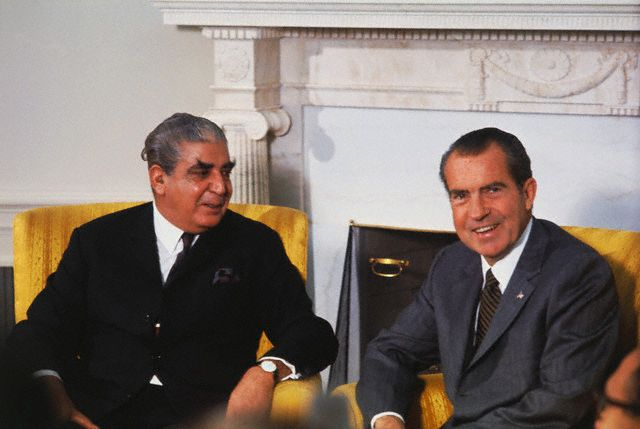
Third president of Pakistan, Yahya Khan, with Richard Nixon in 1970

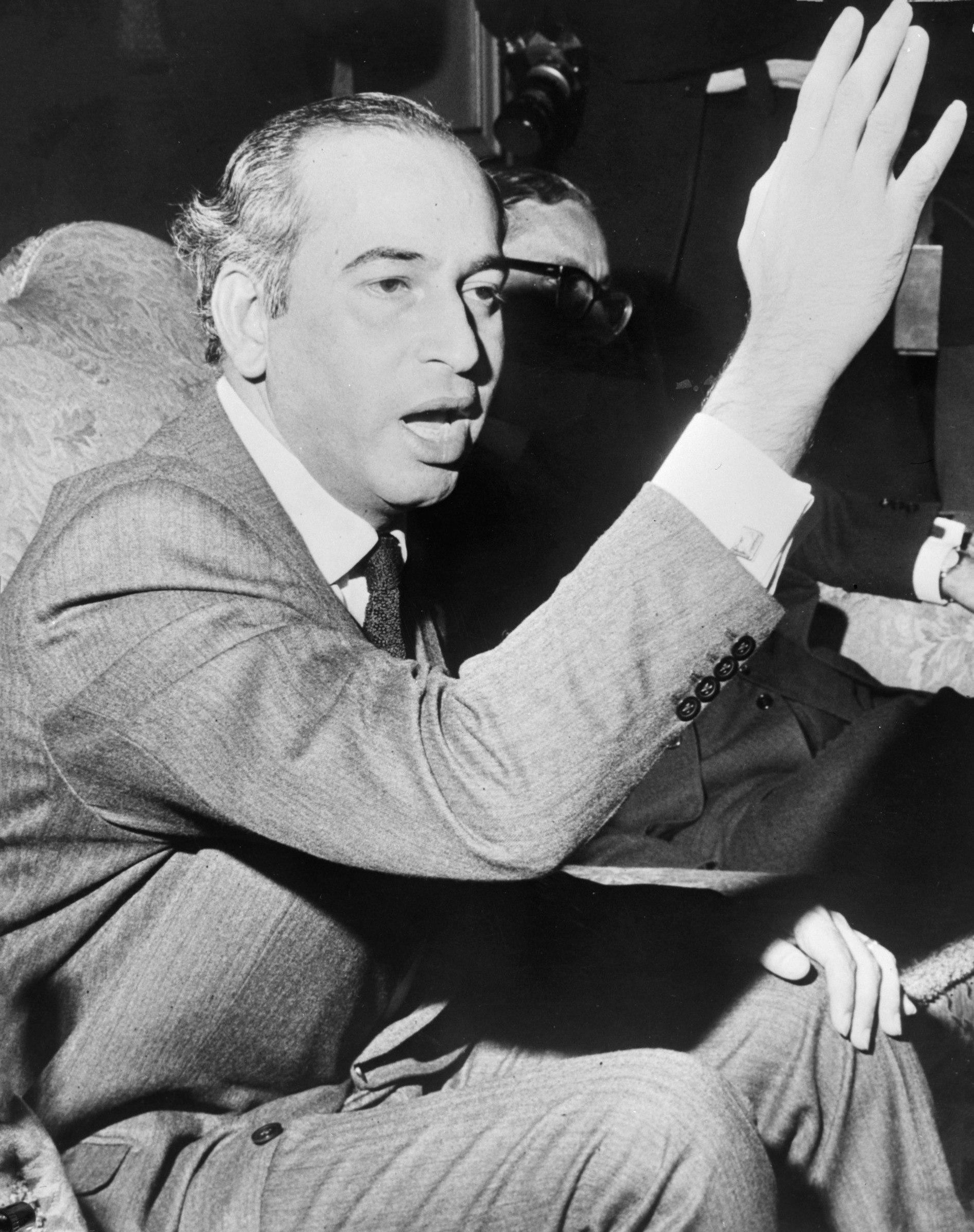
Zulfikar Ali Bhutto in 1971

The tense relations between East and West Pakistan reached a climax in 1970 when the Awami League, the largest East Pakistani political party, led by Sheikh Mujibur Rahman, won a landslide victory in the national elections in East Pakistan. The party won 160 of the 162 seats allotted to East Pakistan, and thus a majority of the 300 seats in the Parliament. This gave the Awami League the constitutional right to form a government without forming a coalition with any other party. Khan invited Mujib to Rawalpindi to take the charge of the office, and negotiations took place between the military government and the Awami Party. Bhutto was shocked with the results and threatened his fellow Peoples Party members if they attended the inaugural session at the National Assembly, famously saying he would "break the legs" of any member of his party who dared enter and attend the session. However, fearing East Pakistani separatism, Bhutto demanded Mujib to form a coalition government. After a secret meeting held in Larkana, Mujib agreed to give Bhutto the office of the presidency with Mujib as prime minister. General Yahya Khan and his military government were kept unaware of these developments and under pressure from his own military government, refused to allow Mujib-ur-Rahman to become the prime minister of Pakistan. This increased agitation for greater autonomy in East Pakistan. The military police arrested Mujib and Bhutto and placed them in Adiala Jail in Rawalpindi. The news spread like a fire in both East and West Pakistan, and the struggle for independence began in East Pakistan.

The senior high command officers in Pakistan Armed Forces, and Zulfikar Ali Bhutto, began to pressure General Yahya Khan to take armed action against Mujib and his party. Bhutto later distanced himself from Yahya Khan after he was arrested by military police along with Mujib. Soon after the arrests, a high-level meeting was chaired by Yahya Khan. During the meeting, high commanders of the Pakistan Armed Forces unanimously recommended an armed and violent military action. East Pakistan's martial law administrator Admiral Ahsan, Governor of East Pakistan, and Air Commodore Zafar Masud, air officer commanding of Dacca's only airbase, were the only officers to object to the plans. When it became obvious that military action in East Pakistan was inevitable, Admiral Ahsan resigned from his position as martial law administrator in protest, and immediately flew back to Karachi, West Pakistan. Disheartened and isolated, Admiral Ahsan took early retirement from the Navy and quietly settled in Karachi. Once Operation Searchlight and Operation Barisal commenced, Air Marshal Masud flew to West Pakistan, and unlike Admiral Ahsan, tried to stop the violence in East Pakistan. When he failed in his attempts to meet General Yahya Khan, Masud too resigned from his position as AOC of Dacca airbase and took retirement from Air Force.

Lieutenant-general Sahibzada Yaqub Khan was sent into East Pakistan in an emergency, following a major blow of the resignation of Vice Admiral Ahsan. General Yaqub temporarily assumed the control of the province, he was also made the corps-commander of Eastern Corps. General Yaqub mobilised the entire major forces in East Pakistan.

Sheikh Mujibur Rahman made a declaration of independence at Dacca on 26 March 1971. All major Awami League leaders including elected leaders of the National Assembly and Provincial Assembly fled to neighbouring India and an exile government was formed headed by Sheikh Mujibur Rahman. While he was in a Pakistan prison, Syed Nazrul Islam was the acting president with Tajuddin Ahmed as the prime minister. The exile government took oath on 17 April 1971 at Mujibnagar, within East Pakistan territory of Kushtia district, and formally formed the government. Colonel MAG Osmani was appointed the commander in chief of Liberation Forces and whole East Pakistan was divided into eleven sectors headed by eleven sector commanders. All sector commanders were Bengali officers who had defected from the Pakistan Army. This started the nine-month long Bangladesh Liberation War in which the freedom fighters, joined in December 1971 by 400,000 Indian soldiers, faced the Pakistani Armed Forces of 365,000 plus paramilitary and collaborationist forces. An additional approximately 25,000 ill-equipped civilian volunteers and police forces also sided with the Pakistan Armed Forces. Bloody guerrilla warfare ensued in East Pakistan.

The Pakistan Armed Forces were unable to counter such threats. With no intel and low morale, they performed poorly and were inexperienced in guerrilla tactics, Pakistan Armed Forces and their assets were defeated by the Bangladesh Liberation Forces. In April 1971, Lieutenant-general Tikka Khan succeeded General Yaqub Khan as the corps commander. General Tikka Khan led the massive violent and massacre campaigns in the region. He is held responsible for killing hundreds of thousands of Bengali people in East Pakistan, mostly civilians and unarmed peoples. For his role, General Tikka Khan gained the title of "Butcher of Bengal". General Khan faced an international reaction against Pakistan, and therefore, General Tikka was removed as commander of the Eastern front. He installed a civilian administration under Abdul Motaleb Malik on 31 August 1971, which proved to be ineffective. However, during the meeting, with no high officers willing to assume the command of East Pakistan, Lieutenant-general Amir Abdullah Khan Niazi volunteered for the command of East Pakistan. Inexperienced and the large magnitude of this assignment, the government sent Rear-admiral Mohammad Shariff as flag officer commanding of Eastern Naval Command (Pakistan). Admiral Shariff served as the deputy of General Niazi when doing joint military operations. However, General Niazi proved to be a failure and ineffective ruler. Therefore, General Niazi and Air Commodore Inamul Haque Khan, AOC, PAF Base Dacca, failed to launch any operation in East Pakistan against Indian or its allies. Except for Admiral Shariff who continued to keep pressure on the Indian Navy until the end of the conflict. Admiral Shariff's effective plans made it nearly impossible for the Indian Navy to land its naval forces on the shores of East Pakistan. The Indian Navy was unable to land forces in East Pakistan and the Pakistan Navy was still offering resistance. The Indian Army, entered East Pakistan from all three directions of the province. The Indian Navy then decided to wait near the Bay of Bengal until the Army reached the shore.

The Indian Air Force dismantled the capability of the Pakistan Air Force in East Pakistan. Air Commodore Inamul Haque Khan, Dacca airbase's AOC, failed to offer any serious resistance to the actions of the Indian Air Force. For the most part of the war, the IAF enjoyed complete dominance in the skies over East Pakistan.

On 16 December 1971, the Pakistan Armed Forces surrendered to the joint liberation forces of Mukti Bahini and the Indian Army, headed by Lieutenant-general Jagjit Singh Arora, the general officer commanding-in-chief (GOC-in-C) of the Eastern Command of the Indian Army. Lieutenant General AAK Niazi, the last corps commander of Eastern Corps, signed the Instrument of Surrender at about 4:31 pm. Over 93,000 personnel, including Lt. General Niazi and Admiral Shariff, were taken as prisoners of war.

On 16 December 1971, the territory of East Pakistan was handed over to the Indian Army under the surrender agreement from West Pakistan and in the Simla Agreement became the newly independent state of Bangladesh. The Eastern Command, civilian institutions, and paramilitary forces were disbanded in the following months.

== Geography ==
In contrast to the desert and rugged mountainous terrain of West Pakistan, East Pakistan featured the world's largest delta, 700 rivers, and tropical hilly jungles. The Chittagong Division of East Pakistan was home to hill ranges and forests (mainly in the Chittagong Hill Tracts and Sylhet). The Khulna Division and parts of the Dacca and Chittagong Divisions were largely Deltaic. East Pakistan was almost entirely an alluvial plain which consists of lower course of the Padma and Jamuna. Climatically, East Pakistan was essentially humid, hot climate with heavy to very heavy rainfall. The implication of East Pakistan's heavy rainfall was that the main crops that were grown in East Pakistan were rice, tea, and jute.

=== Administrative geography ===
East Pakistan inherited 17 districts from British Bengal.

In 1960, Lower Tippera was renamed Comilla.

In 1969, two new districts were created with Tangail separated from Mymensingh and Patuakhali from Bakerganj.

East Pakistan's districts are listed in the following.

East and West Pakistan

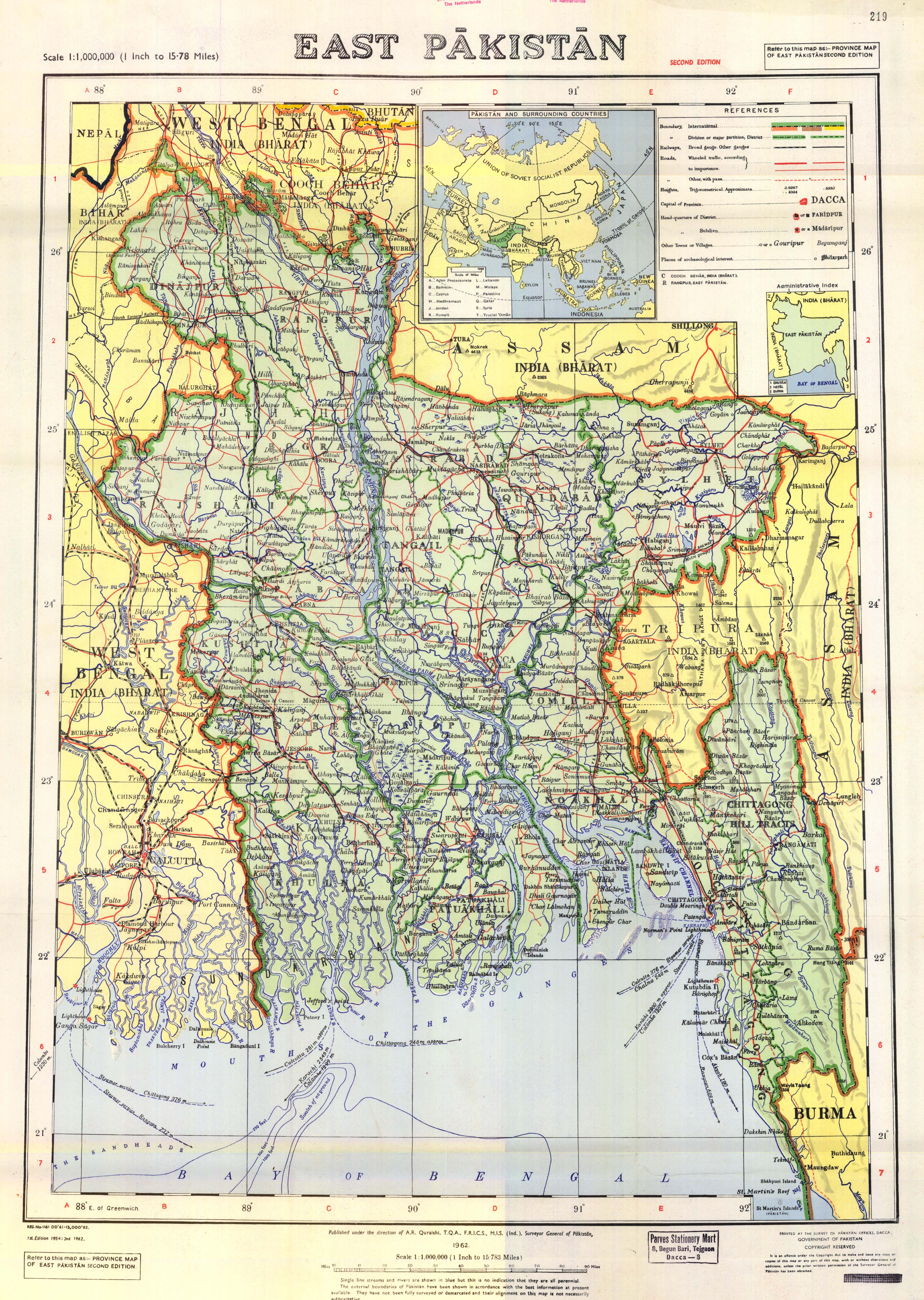
Provincial Map of East Pakistan, 1962

Division	East Pakistani District	Current Bangladeshi Districts
Dacca Division	Dacca District	Dhaka Division (without Greater Faridpur)
Dacca Division	Faridpur District	Greater Faridpur
Dacca Division	Mymensingh District	Mymensingh Division and Kishoreganj
Dacca Division	Tangail District	Tangail (Part of Greater Mymensingh)
Chittagong Division	Hill Tracts District	Chittagong Hill Tracts
Chittagong Division	Chittagong District	Chittagong, Cox's Bazar
Chittagong Division	Comilla (Lower Tippera) District	Comilla, Chandpur, Brahmanbaria
Chittagong Division	Noakhali District	Noakhali, Feni, Lakshmipur
Chittagong Division	Sylhet District	Sylhet, Moulvibazar, Habiganj, Sunamganj
Rajshahi Division	Bogra District	Bogra, Joypurhat
Rajshahi Division	Dinajpur District	Dinajpur, Thakurgaon, Panchagarh
Rajshahi Division	Rajshahi District	Rajshahi, Nawabganj, Natore, Naogaon
Rajshahi Division	Rangpur District	Rangpur Division (without Dinajpur, Thakurgaon, Panchagarh)
Rajshahi Division	Pabna District	Pabna, Sirajganj
Khulna Division	Bakerganj District	Barisal, Jhalokati, Pirojpur
Khulna Division	Jessore District	Jessore, Jhenaidah, Narail, Magura
Khulna Division	Khulna District	Khulna, Satkhira, Bagerhat
Khulna Division	Kushtia District	Kushtia, Meherpur, Chuadanga
Khulna Division	Patuakhali District	Patuakhali, Barguna, Bhola

== Economy ==
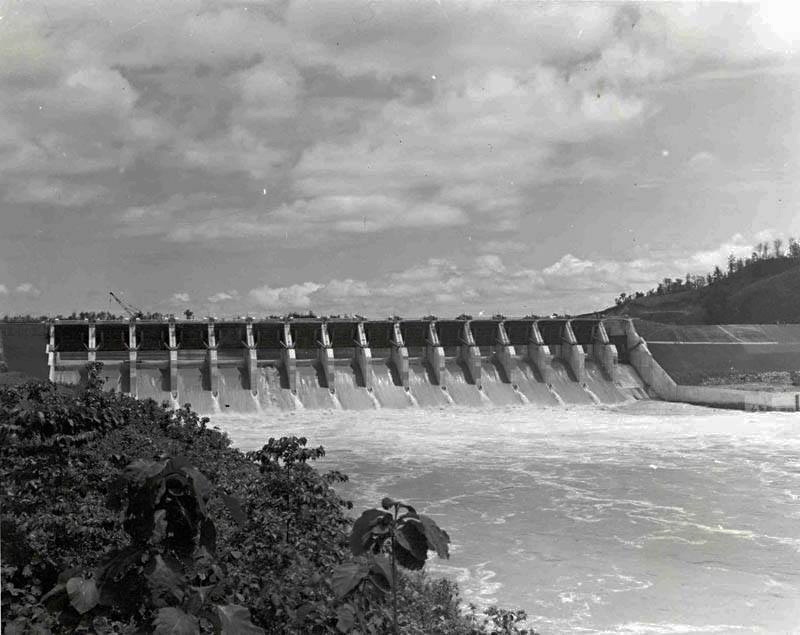
The Kaptai Dam in 1965

1971 documentary film about East Pakistan

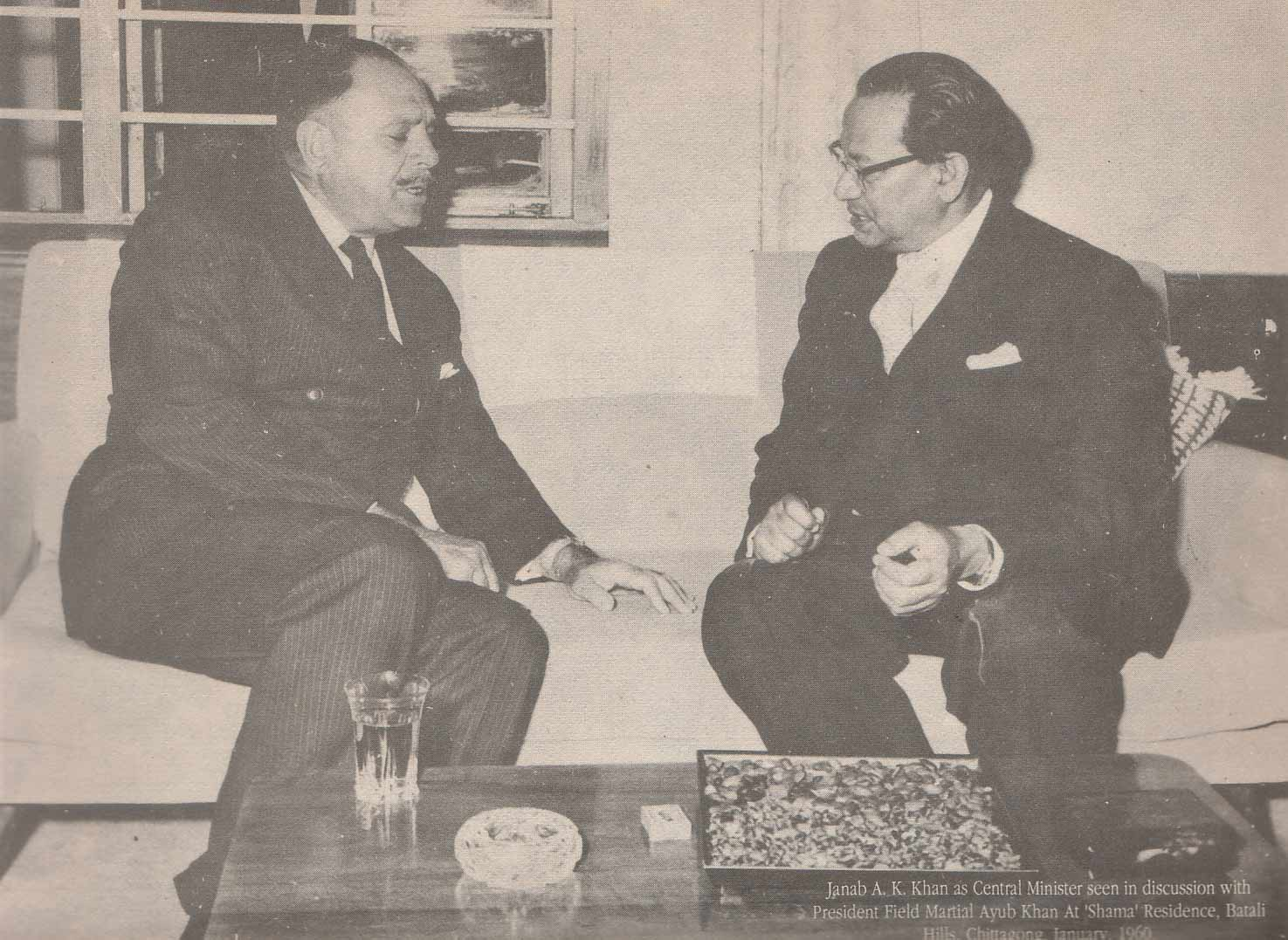
President Ayub Khan (left) with Bengali industrialist Abul Kashem Khan (right) in Chittagong

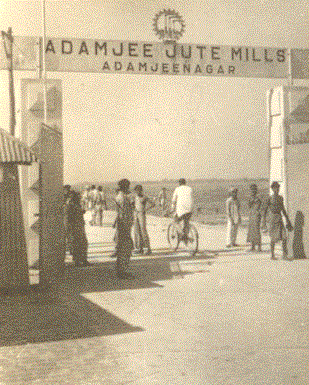
Entrance to the Adamjee Jute Mills, the world's largest jute processing plant, in 1950

At the time of the Partition of British India, East Bengal had a plantation economy. The Chittagong Tea Auction was established in 1949 as the region was home to the world's largest tea plantations. The East Pakistan Stock Exchange Association was established in 1954. Many wealthy Muslim immigrants from India, Burma, and former British colonies settled in East Pakistan. The Ispahani family, Africawala brothers, and the Adamjee family were pioneers of industrialisation in the region. Many of modern Bangladesh's leading companies were born in the East Pakistan period.

An airline founded in British Bengal, Orient Airways, launched the vital air link between East and West Pakistan with DC-3 aircraft on the Dacca-Calcutta-Delhi-Karachi route. Orient Airways later evolved into Pakistan International Airlines, whose first chairman was the East Pakistan-based industrialist Mirza Ahmad Ispahani.

By the 1950s, East Bengal surpassed West Bengal in having the largest jute industries in the world. The Adamjee Jute Mills was the largest jute processing plant in history and its location in Narayanganj was nicknamed the Dundee of the East. The Adamjees were descendants of Sir Haji Adamjee Dawood, who made his fortune in British Burma.

Natural gas was discovered in the northeastern part of East Pakistan in 1955 by the Burmah Oil Company. Industrial use of natural gas began in 1959. The Shell Oil Company and Pakistan Petroleum tapped 7 gas fields in the 1960s. The industrial seaport city of Chittagong hosted the headquarters of Burmah Eastern and Pakistan National Oil. Iran, an erstwhile leading oil producer, assisted in establishing the Eastern Refinery in Chittagong.

The Comilla Model of the Pakistan Academy for Rural Development (present-day Bangladesh Academy for Rural Development) was conceived by Akhtar Hameed Khan and replicated in many developing countries.

In 1965, Pakistan implemented the Kaptai Dam hydroelectric project in the southeastern part of East Pakistan with American assistance. It was the sole hydroelectric dam in East Pakistan. The project was controversial for displacing over 40,000 indigenous people from the area.

The centrally located metropolis Dacca witnessed significant urban growth.

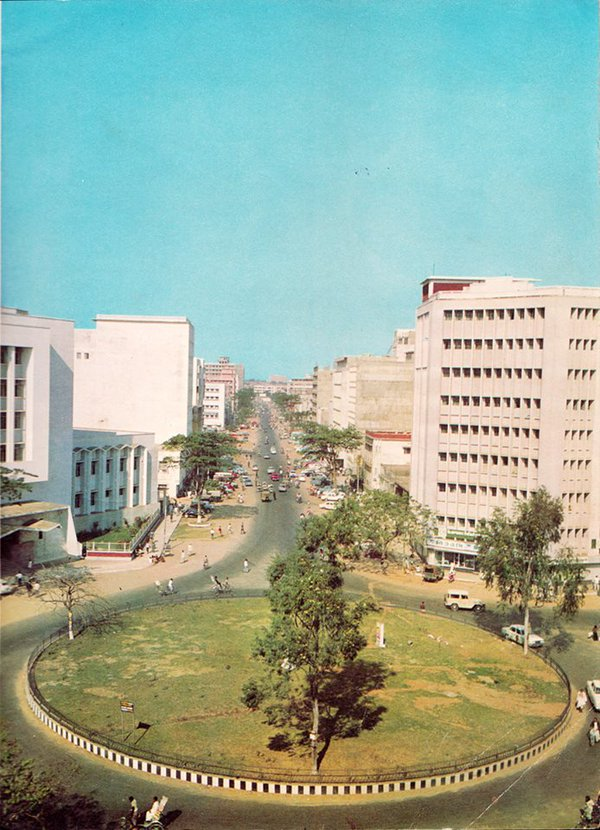
Central business district in Dacca, 1960s

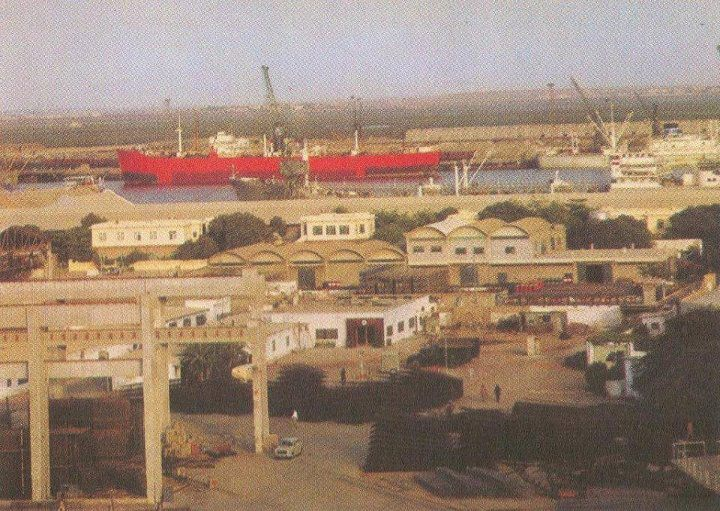
Chittagong Port in 1960

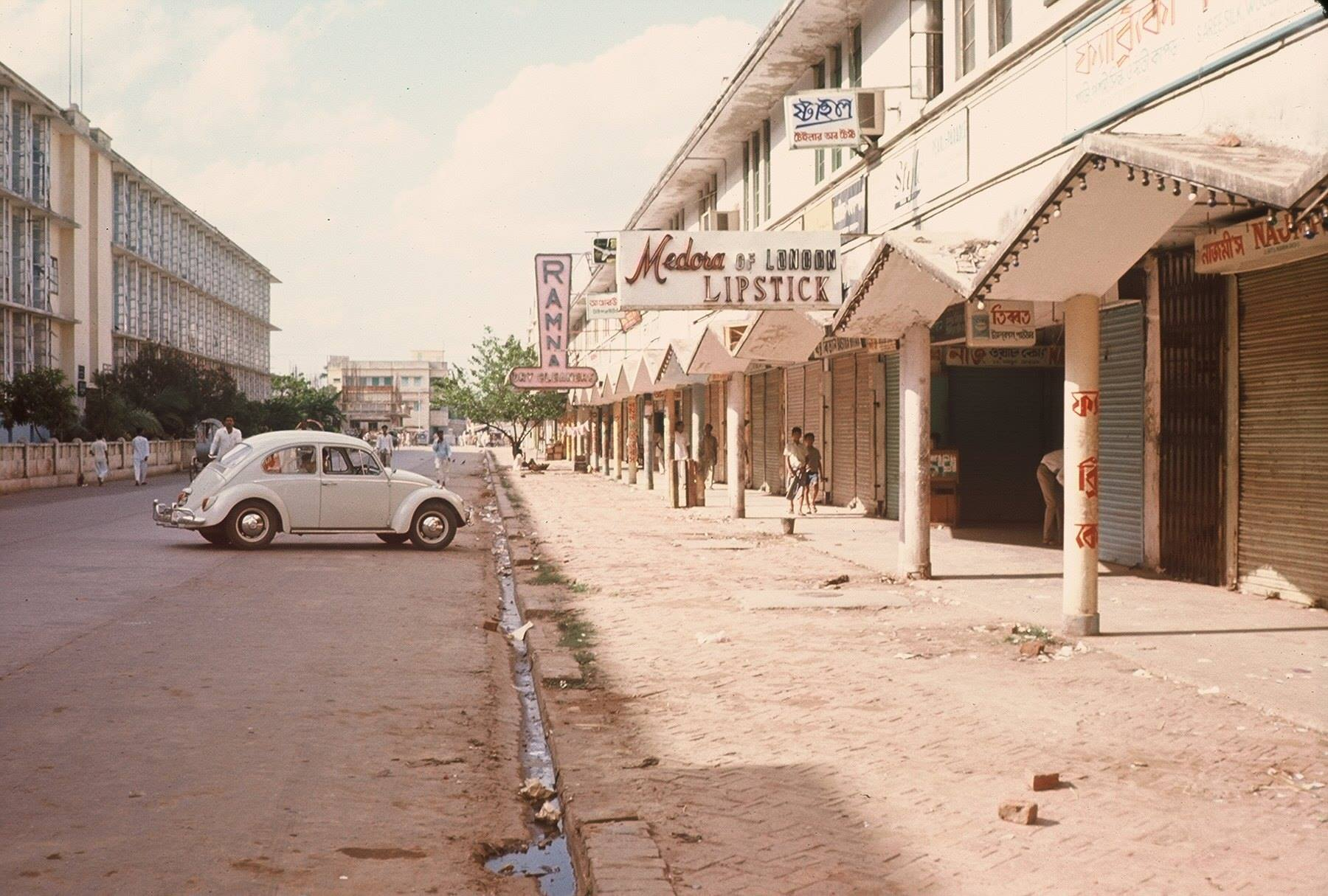
Baitul Mukarram Market Area, Dacca, 1967

Emblem of East Pakistan till 1970

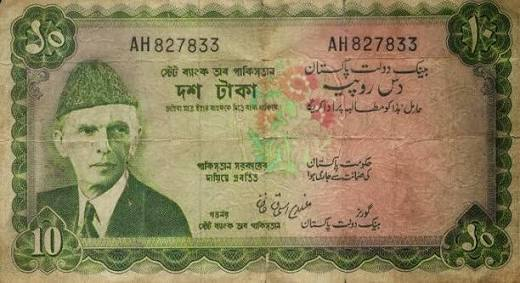
Pakistani banknotes included Bengali script until 1971.

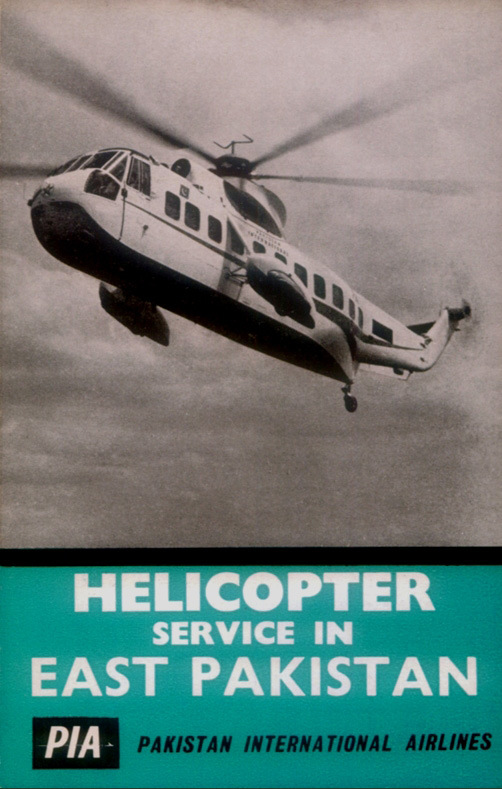
A poster of the East Pakistan Helicopter Service

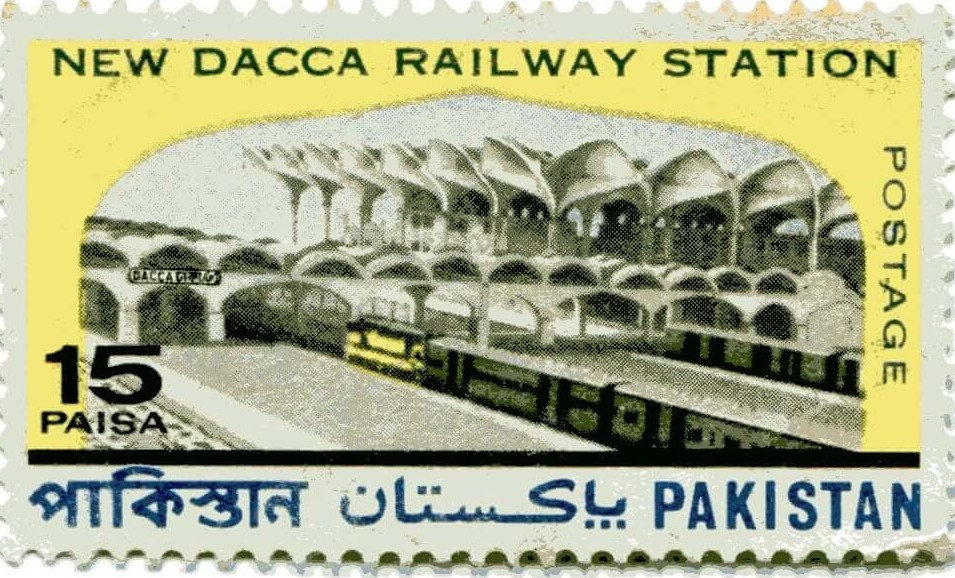
Pakistani Postage stamp issued on the occasion of first anniversary of New Railway Station—Dacca in 1969

=== Economic discrimination and disparity ===
Although, East Pakistan had a larger population, West Pakistan dominated the divided country politically and received more money from the common budget. According to the World Bank, there was much economic discrimination against East Pakistan, including higher government spending on West Pakistan, financial transfers from East to West, and the use of the East's foreign exchange surpluses to finance the West's imports.

The discrimination occurred despite the fact that East Pakistan generated a major share of Pakistan's exports.

Year	Spending on West Pakistan (in millions of Pakistani rupees)	Spending on East Pakistan (in millions of Pakistani rupees)	Amount spent on East as percentage of West
1950–55	11,290	5,240	46.4
1955–60	16,550	5,240	31.7
1960–65	33,550	14,040	41.8
1965–70	51,950	21,410	41.2
Total	113,340	45,930	40.5
Source: Reports of the Advisory Panels for the Fourth Five Year Plan 1970–75, Vol. I, published by the planning commission of Pakistan.

The annual rate of growth of the gross domestic product per capita was 4.4% in West Pakistan versus 2.6% in East Pakistan from 1960 to 1965. Bengali politicians pushed for more autonomy, arguing that much of Pakistan's export earnings were generated in East Pakistan from the exportation of Bengali jute and tea. As late as 1960, approximately 70% of Pakistan's export earnings originated in East Pakistan, although this percentage declined as international demand for jute dwindled. By the mid-1960s, East Pakistan was accounting for less than 60% of the nation's export earnings, and by the time Bangladesh gained its independence in 1971, this percentage had dipped below 50%. In 1966, Mujib demanded that separate foreign exchange accounts be kept and that separate trade offices be opened overseas. By the mid-1960s, West Pakistan was benefiting from Ayub's "Decade of Progress" with its successful Green Revolution in wheat and from the expansion of markets for West Pakistani textiles, while East Pakistan's standard of living remained at an abysmally low level. Bengalis were also upset that West Pakistan, the seat of the national government, received more foreign aid. However, East Pakistan did nonetheless benefit from industrialisation and development, which was discerned by the Kaptai Dam in the Chittagong Hill Tracts for instance.

Economists in East Pakistan argued a "Two Economies Theory" within Pakistan itself, which was founded on the Two-Nation Theory with India. The so-called Two Economies Theory suggested that East and West Pakistan had different economic features which should not be regulated by a federal government in Islamabad.

== Demographics and culture ==
The Daily Ittefaq, edited by Tofazzal Hossain, was the leading Bengali newspaper in Pakistan.

The first Bangladeshi flag was hoisted on 23 March 1971 across East Pakistan, as a protest on Republic Day.

East Pakistan was home to 55% of Pakistan's population. The largest ethnic group of the province were Bengalis, who in turn were the largest ethnic group in Pakistan. Bengali Muslims formed the predominant majority, followed by Bengali Hindus, Bengali Buddhists and Bengali Christians. East Pakistan also had many tribal groups, including the Chakmas, Marmas, Tangchangyas, Tripuris, Garos, Manipuris, Santhals and Bawms. They largely followed the religions of Buddhism, Christianity and Hinduism. East Pakistan was home to immigrant Muslims from across the Indian subcontinent, including West Bengal, Bihar, Sindh, Gujarat, the Northwest Frontier Province, Assam, Orissa, the Punjab and Kerala. A small Armenian and Jewish minority resided in East Pakistan.

The Asiatic Society of Pakistan was founded in Old Dacca by Ahmad Hasan Dani in 1948. The Bangla Academy was established in 1954.

Among East Pakistan's newspapers, The Daily Ittefaq was the leading Bengali language title; while Holiday was a leading English title.

At the time of partition, East Bengal had 80 cinemas. The first movie produced in East Pakistan was Mukh O Mukhosh (The Face and the Mask) in 1955. Pakistan Television established its second studio in Dacca after Lahore in 1965. Runa Laila was Pakistan's first pop star and became popular in India as well. Shabnam was a leading actress from East Pakistan. Feroza Begum was a leading exponent of Bengali classical Nazrul geeti. Jasimuddin and Abbasuddin Ahmed promoted Bengali folk music. Munier Chowdhury, Syed Mujtaba Ali, Nurul Momen, Sufia Kamal and Shamsur Rahman were among the leading literary figures in East Pakistan. Several East Pakistanis were awarded the Sitara-e-Imtiaz and the Pride of Performance.

=== Religion ===
Religion in Pakistan (1951 Official Census)
1. Islam (85.9%)
2. Hinduism (12.9%)
3. Christianity (0.70%)
4. Other (0.50%)
Religion in East Pakistan (1951 Census)
1. Islam (76.8%)
2. Hinduism (22.0%)
3. Christianity (0.30%)
4. Others (0.90%)

As per the 1951 census, East Pakistan had a population of 44,251,826 people, of which 76.9% (~34,029,654) followed Islam, 22.0% (~9,735,402) people followed Hinduism and 1.1% (~486,770) people followed other religions: Buddhism, Christianity and Animism. According to the 1961 census, Muslims made up 80.4% of the population, Hindus were 18.4%, and the remaining 1.2% belonged to other religions, mainly Christianity and Buddhism.

== Military ==
=== Strength ===
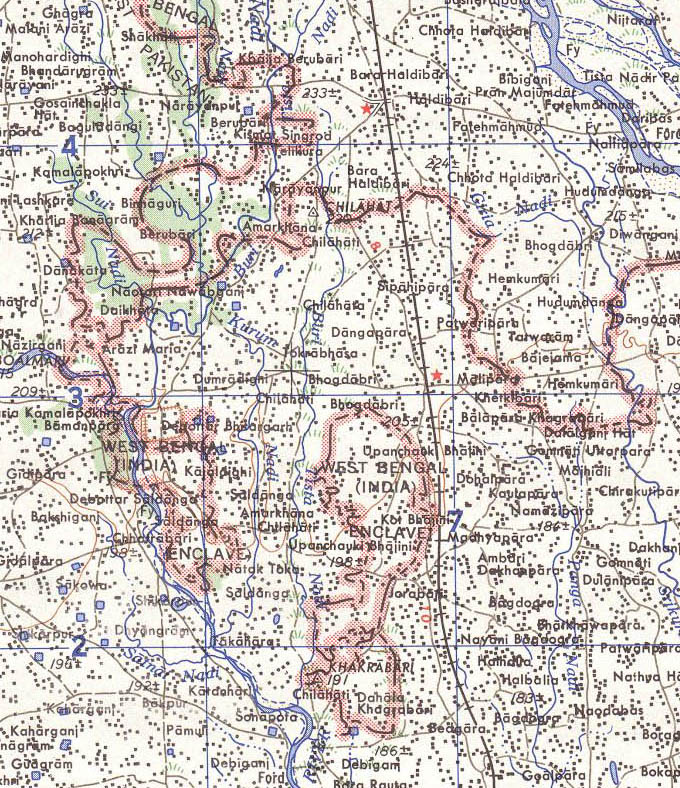
The Indo-East Pakistan border as shown by the U.S. Army, c. 1960

Since its unification with Pakistan, the East Pakistan Army had consisted of only 1 infantry brigade made up of two battalions, the 1st East Bengal Regiment and the 1/14 or 3/8 Punjab Regiment in 1948. These two battalions fielded only five rifle companies between them (an infantry battalion normally had five companies). This weak brigade was under the command of Brigadier Ayub Khan (acting Major-general – GOC of 14th Army Division), together with the East Pakistan Rifles (EPR), which was tasked with defending East Pakistan during the Indo-Pakistani War of 1947. The East Pakistan Army had barely 150,000 troops (50,000-70,000 regular soldiers) at its peak despite needing at least 250,000 personals to act strongly in any major armed conflict.The military was composed with estimated 6,000 personals from East Bengal Regiment divided in six battalions. The paramilitary East Pakistan Rifles (EPR) was built with around 12,000-15,000 personals on duty. However, during the 1971 civil war, East Pakistan Civil Armed Force (EPCAF) was created to replace EPR and it had 23,000-25,000 personals where it was divided into at least seventeen wings. EPCAF also had additional 17 planes.

The PAF, Marines, and the Navy had little presence in the region. Only 1 PAF combatant squadron, No. 14 Squadron Tail Choppers, was active in East Pakistan. This combatant squadron was commanded by Squadron Leader Parvaiz Mehdi Qureshi, who later became a four-star general. The army also had only 15 combat aircraft along with EPCAF's 17 planes to thwart any Indian retaliations during the 1965 war and 1971 war. The East Pakistan military personnel were trained in combat diving, demolitions, and guerrilla/anti-guerrilla tactics by the advisers from the Special Service Group (Navy), who were also charged with intelligence data collection and management cycle. The East Pakistan Navy had only 1 active-duty combatant destroyer, the PNS Sylhet along with 1 submarine PNS Ghazi (which was repeatedly deployed in the West), 4 gunboats which were inadequate to function in deep water. The joint special operations were managed and undertaken by the Naval Special Service Group (SSG(N)) who was assisted by the army, air force, and marines unit. The entire service, the Marines were deployed in East Pakistan, initially tasked with conducting exercises and combat operations in riverine areas and at the near shoreline. The small directorate of Naval Intelligence (while the headquarters and personnel, facilities, and directions were coordinated by West) had a vital role in directing special and reconnaissance missions, and intelligence gathering also was charged with taking reasonable actions to slow down the Indian threat. The armed forces of East Pakistan also consisted of the paramilitary organisation, the Razakars from the intelligence unit of the ISI's Covert Action Division (CAD).

Despite the racial discrimination by Pakistani army who under-represented Bengalis in the Pakistan military in the name of ethnic superiority, many Bengali officers could still be notably praised and awarded for there service for the Republic of Pakistan. Notable military officers like M.A.G. Osmani (received Tamgha-e-Jang 1965 War, Tamgha-e-Jamhuria, Pakistan Tamgha), Ziaur Rahman ( received Hilal-i-Jur'at), Saiful Azam (received Sitara-e-Jurat), Mohammad Ishfaqul Mazid, Shafaat Jamil, Khaled Mosharraf, Mahmudur Rahman Majumdar, Sayed Farooq-ur-Rahman, Mohammad Ziauddin (officer).

=== Engagements ===
- Nachole Uprising
- First Rohingya Rebellion
- 1958 Pakistan-India border skirmishes
- 1965 India–Pakistan War
- 1969 East Pakistan mass uprising
- Bangladesh Liberation War

==== Battles ====
1965 India–Pakistan War

- List of aerial victories during the Indo-Pakistani war of 1965

Bangladesh Liberation War

- India–Pakistan naval fights of 1971
  - Operation Jackpot
- Battle of Daruin
- Nakshi Border Outpost Attack
- Battle at Ghashipur
- Battle of Dhalai
- Operation Cactus Lilly
- Battle of Garibpur
- Battle of Sylhet
- Battle of Gazipur
- East Pakistan Air Operations
  - Operation Kilo Flight
  - Tangail Airdrop
- Battle of Boyra
- Battle of Hilli
- Battle of Kushtia
- Battle of Shiromoni
- Operation Barisal
- First Battle of Kamalpur
- Second Battle of Kamalpur
- Bangladesh Genocide
  - Operation Searchlight
  - 1971 killing of Bengali intellectuals

== Governors ==
Political Party

Muslim League
Krishak Sramik Party
Independent
- Military Governor

Legend

Acting Governor
Functioned and exercised power as governor by the order of president without being appointed as one

List of Governors of East Pakistan
#	Portrait	Governor	Term of office			Political Party	President
#	Portrait	Governor	Term start	Term end	Time in office	Political Party	President
[-]		Justice Amiruddin Ahmad (acting) (Note: Justice Amiruddin Ahmad, Chief Justice of Dhaka High Court, was appointed acting governor on the resignation of Justice Muhammad Shahabuddin) (1895-1965)	As Governor of East Bengal: June 14, 1955 As Governor of East Pakistan: 29 February 1956	9 March 1956	As Governor of East Bengal: 260 days As Governor of East Pakistan: 9 days As Governor of Eastern Wing: 269 days	Independent	Iskander Mirza
1		Sher-e-Bangla; A. K. Fazlul Huq (1873 - 1962)	9 March 1956	31 March 1958 (Note: President Iskander Mirza removed A. K. Fazlul Huq as governor on 31 March 1958 on the advice of the Noon cabinet for allegedly overstepping his limits as a constitutional governor. Huq had dismissed Ataur Rahman's Ministry of Awami League that had not been defeated on the floor of the House, and had installed Mr. Abu Hussain Sarkar of his own party Krishak Sramik Party as Chief Minister.)	2 years, 22 days	Krishak Sramik Party	Iskander Mirza
[-]		Muhammad Hamid Ali (acting) (Note: Muhammad Hamid Ali, Chief Secretary to the Governor of East Pakistan, was appointed Acting Governor in pursuance of the provisions of Article 70 of the Constitution following the removal of Sher-e-Bangla A. K. Fazlul Huq from the office) (1906-1972)	1 April 1958	3 May 1958	32 days	Independent	Iskander Mirza
2		Sultanuddin Ahmad (1902-1977)	Appointment: 26 April 1958 Sworn in: 3 May 1958	10 October 1958 (Note: Sultanuddin Ahmad was removed from office on 10 October 1958 soon after the promulgation of Martial Law in Pakistan on 7 October)	160 days	Independent	Iskander Mirza
3		Zakir Husain (1898-1971)	Appointment: 10 October 1958 Sworn in: 11 October 1958	14 April 1960	1 year, 186 days	Independent	Iskander Mirza Ayub Khan
4		Lieutenant General Azam Khan (1908-1994)	15 April 1960	10 May 1962	2 years, 25 days	Military	Ayub Khan
[-]		Syed Hashim Raza (acting) (Note: Syed Hashim Raza was Acting Governor of the province during the absence of General Azam Khan's official visit to West Germany.) (1910-2003)	1 July 1961	5 August 1961	35 days	Independent	Ayub Khan
5		Ghulam Faruque Khan (1899-1992)	11 May 1962	25 October 1962 (Note: Unable to cope with the political problems of East Pakistan, Ghulam Faruque Khan resigned from office.)	167 days	Independent	Ayub Khan
6		Abdul Monem Khan (1899-1971)	28 October 1962	23 March 1969	6 years, 146 days (Longest Serving)	Muslim League	Ayub Khan
7		Mirza Nurul Huda (1919-1991)	23 March 1969	25 March 1969 (Note: With the promulgation of Martial Law throughout Pakistan and the abrogation of the constitution in the evening of 25 March, Mirza Nurul Huda's tenure of governorship came to an abrupt end after just 60 hours.)	2 days	Independent	Ayub Khan
8		Major General Muzaffaruddin (Note: On 25 March 1969 General Yahya Khan proclaimed martial law and divided the country into two administrative zones: West Pakistan (Zone 'A') and East Pakistan (Zone 'B'). Muzaffaruddin was the general officer commanding of the 14th Division and became martial law administrator, Zone 'B'. On 8 April 1969, Yahya Khan issued an order directing that the martial law administrators of Zone 'A' and 'B' would perform the functions and powers of the Governors of West and East Pakistan respectively. Thus Muzaffaruddin became martial law administrator and also exercised the powers and functions of Governor of East Pakistan.) (Martial law administrator)	25 March 1969	23 August 1969	151 days	Military	Yahya Khan
9		Lieutenant General Sahabzada Yaqub Khan (Note: Appointed as martial law administrator of Zone 'B' and exercised the powers and functions of the Governor of East Pakistan.) (1920-2016) (Martial law administrator)	23 August 1969	1 September 1969 (Note: On 8 April 1969, President Yahya Khan issued an order directing that the martial law administrators would perform the functions and powers of the governor. However, a notification issued by the cabinet secretariat on 1 September 1969 cancelled the order of 8 April 1969 and directed martial law administrators to refrain from performing the functions of governor in their respective provinces with immediate effect. Lt. General Yaqub Khan remained martial law administrator until Vice Admiral S. M. Ahsan took over as the new Governor of East Pakistan on 1 September 1969)	9 days	Military	Yahya Khan
10		Vice Admiral S. M. Ahsan (1921-1989)	1 September 1969	1 March 1971	1 year, 181 days	Military	Yahya Khan
11		Lieutenant General Sahabzada Yaqub Khan (Note: Appointed the "head of civil administration in the province" and exercised the functions and powers of governor from 1 March 1971 until the arrival of Lieutenant General Tikka Khan on 7 March 1971.) (1920-2016) (Head of Civil Administration)	1 March 1971	7 March 1971	6 days	Military	Yahya Khan
12		Lieutenant General Tikka Khan (1915-2002)	Appointment: 6 March 1971 Sworn in: 7 March 1971 Officially announced: 9 March 1971	3 September 1971	180 days	Military	Yahya Khan
13		Abdul Motaleb Malik (1905-1977)	Appointment: 31 August 1971 Sworn in: 3 September 1971	14 December 1971 (Note: Abdul Motaleb Malik along with his cabinet resigned on 14 December after realising that Pakistani defeat was imminent and sought refuse in Hotel Intercontinental, seeking the protection of the Red Cross flag.)	102 days	Muslim League	Yahya Khan
14		Lieutenant General A. A. K. Niazi (Note: Commander of the Eastern Command of the Pakistan Army and as the supreme authority of Pakistan in its eastern wing, functioned and exercised power as the Governor of East Pakistan after the resignation of Abdul Motaleb Malik during the last 48 hours of Bangladesh Liberation War) (1915-2004) (Supreme Authority of East Pakistan)	14 December 1971	16 December 1971	2 days	Military	Yahya Khan

== Chief ministers ==
Political Party

Muslim League
Krishak Sramik Party
United Front
Awami League

#	Portrait	Name	Term of office			Political Party	Governor	Governor-General/ President
#	Portrait	Name	Term start	Term end	Time in office	Political Party	Governor	Governor-General/ President
1		Sir Khawaja Nazimuddin (1894 – 1964)	August 15, 1947	September 4, 1948	1 year, 20 days	Muslim League	Sir Frederick Chalmers Bourne	Muhammad Ali Jinnah
2		Nurul Amin (1893 – 1974)	September 14, 1948	April 3, 1954	5 years, 201 days	Muslim League	Sir Feroz Khan Noon	Sir Khawaja Nazimuddin Malik Ghulam Muhammad
3		Sher-e-Bangla; A. K. Fazlul Huq (1873 - 1962)	April 3, 1954	May 29, 1954	56 days	United Front	Chaudhry Khaliquzzaman	Malik Ghulam Muhammad
[-]		Vacant (Governor's rule)	May 29, 1954	June 20, 1955	1 year, 22 days	N/A	-	Malik Ghulam Muhammad
4		Abu Hussain Sarkar (1894 - 1969)	As Chief minister of East Bengal: June 20, 1955 As Chief minister of East Pakistan: February 29, 1956	August 30, 1956	As Chief minister of East Bengal: 254 days As Chief minister of East Pakistan: 183 days As Chief minister of Eastern Wing 1 year, 71 days	Krishak Sramik Party	Iskander Mirza Sir Thomas Hobart Ellis (Acting) Muhammad Shahabuddin (Acting)	Malik Ghulam Muhammad Iskander Mirza
5		Ataur Rahman Khan (1907 - 1991)	September 1, 1956	March 31, 1958	1 year, 211 days	Awami League	Amiruddin Ahmad (Acting) Sher-e-Bangla; A. K. Fazlul Huq	Iskander Mirza
(4)		Abu Hussain Sarkar (1894 - 1969)	March 31, 1958	April 1, 1958	1 day	Krishak Sramik Party	Sher-e-Bangla; A. K. Fazlul Huq Muhammad Hamid Ali (Acting)	Iskander Mirza
(5)		Ataur Rahman Khan (1907 - 1991)	April 1, 1958	June 18, 1958	78 days	Awami League	Muhammad Hamid Ali (Acting) Sultanuddin Ahmad	Iskander Mirza Ayub Khan
(4)		Abu Hussain Sarkar (1894 - 1969)	June 18, 1958	June 22, 1958	4 days	Krishak Sramik Party	Sultanuddin Ahmad	Ayub Khan
[-]		Vacant (Governor's rule)	June 22, 1958	August 25, 1958	64 days	N/A	-	Ayub Khan
(5)		Ataur Rahman Khan (1907 - 1991)	August 25, 1958	October 7, 1958	43 days	Awami League	Sultanuddin Ahmad	Ayub Khan

== Legacy in Pakistan ==
The trauma was extremely severe in Pakistan when the news of secession of East Pakistan as Bangladesh arrived—a psychological setback, a complete and humiliating defeat that shattered the prestige of the Pakistan Armed Forces. The governor and martial law administrator, Lieutenant-general Amir Abdullah Khan Niazi, was defamed, his image was maligned and he was stripped of his honours. The people of Pakistan could not come to terms with the magnitude of the defeat, and spontaneous demonstrations and mass protests erupted on the streets of major cities across west Pakistan. General Yahya Khan surrendered powers to Nurul Amin of the Pakistan Muslim League, the first and last vice-president and prime minister of Pakistan.

Prime Minister Amin invited then-President Zulfikar Ali Bhutto and the Pakistan Peoples Party to take control of Pakistan in a colourful ceremony where Bhutto gave a daring speech to the nation on national television. At the ceremony, Bhutto waved his fist in the air and pledged to his nation to never again allow the surrender of his country like what happened with East Pakistan. He launched and orchestrated the large-scale atomic bomb project in 1972. In memorial of East Pakistan, the East-Pakistan diaspora in Pakistan established the East-Pakistan colony in Karachi, Sindh. In accordance, the East-Pakistani diaspora also composed patriotic tributes to Pakistan after the war; songs such as "Sohni Dharti" (lit. "Beautiful Land") and "Jeevay, Jeevay Pakistan" (lit. "long-live, long-live Pakistan"), were composed by Bengali singer Shahnaz Rahmatullah in the 1970s and 1980s.

According to William Langewiesche, writing for The Atlantic, "it may seem obvious that the loss of Bangladesh was a blessing"—but it has never been seen that way in Pakistan. In the book Scoop! Inside Stories from the Partition to the Present, Indian politician Kuldip Nayar opined, "Losing East Pakistan and Bhutto's releasing of Mujib did not mean anything to Pakistan's policy—as if there was no liberation war". Bhutto's policy, and even today the policy of Pakistan, is that "she will continue to fight for the honour and integrity of Pakistan".

== See also ==
- The Blood telegram
- Bangladesh–Pakistan relations
- Indo-Pakistani War of 1971
- East Pakistan football team
- List of East Pakistan first-class cricketers
- Partition of India
- Provincial Government of East Pakistan
- West Pakistan
