= Governor of East Pakistan =

Defunct provincial head post of East Pakistan

- گورنر مشرقی پاکستان (Urdu) পূর্ব পাকিস্তানের গভর্নর (Bengali)

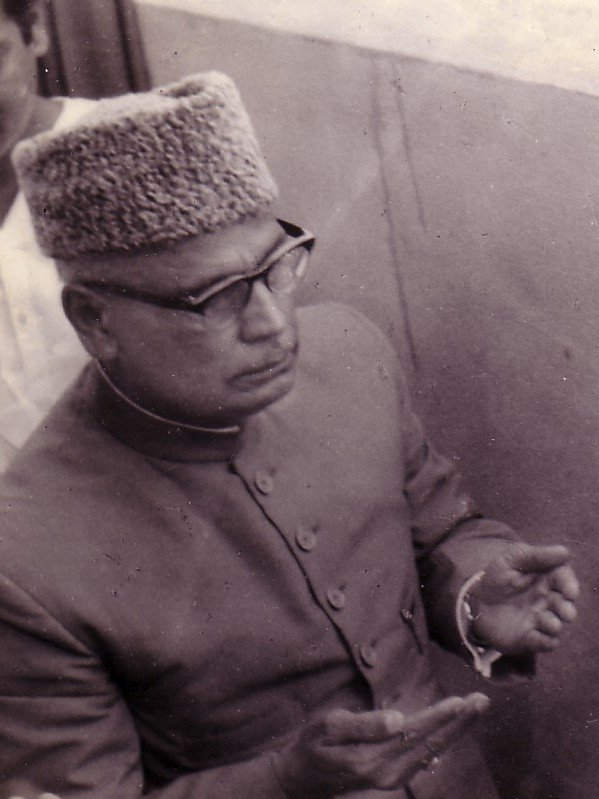
- Longest serving Abdul Monem Khan; 28 October 1962 – 23 March 1969; 6 years, 146 days
- Government of East Pakistan
- Style: The Honourable
- Type: Head of province
- Abbreviation: GOEB; GOEP
- Reports to: President of Pakistan
- Residence: Governor's House (1947 - 1961); Uttara Ganabhaban (1961 - 1969); Dacca Cantonment (1969 - 1971)
- Seat: Dacca
- Nominator: President of Pakistan
- Appointer: President of Pakistan
- Term length: At pleasure of the President
- Precursor: Governor of Bengal
- Formation: 15 August 1947; 79 years ago
- First holder: Frederick Chalmers Bourne
- Final holder: Lt. General A. A. K. Niazi
- Abolished: 16 December 1971; 54 years ago
- Succession: President of Bangladesh

The Governor of East Pakistan, formerly known as the Governor of East Bengal, served as the appointed head of province of the provincial government and the representative of President of Pakistan in East Pakistan (previously East Bengal). The Governor functioned as the head of government during periods of Governor's Rule in East Pakistan, between 1954–1955 and 1958–1972, when the Provincial Assembly was dissolved. In periods when the Chief Minister held executive authority, the Governor primarily served as a ceremonial head of state.

== Under Dominion of Pakistan (1947 – 1954) ==
From 1947 to 1954, the governance of East Bengal was based on the Indian Independence Act, 1947 and Government of India Act 1935 - with certain adaptations, which provided the legal framework for provincial administration. The office of the Governor of East Bengal was the highest executive authority in the province, acting as the representative of the Governor-General of Pakistan. The Governor was responsible for overseeing the administration, implementing federal directives, and maintaining law and order.

=== Appointment ===
The Governor of East Bengal was nominated and appointed by the Governor-General of Pakistan, who acted as the representative of the Head of State (originally King George VI, later Queen Elizabeth II until 1956, when Pakistan became a republic) under the Government of India Act 1935. The appointee was typically a senior bureaucrat, military officer, or politician with experience in governance. The Governor served at the pleasure of the Governor-General, meaning their term was not fixed and could be ended at any time. Before assuming duties, the Governor took an oath of allegiance to the state of Pakistan and accepted the Governor-General as the central executive authority and the laws and constitution governing East Bengal at the time. In the event of a vacancy, the Governor-General could appoint an acting Governor, usually the chief justice of Dhaka High Court, until a permanent replacement was selected.

=== Executive Authority of the Governor ===
Provincial governors were the principal representatives of the Crown at the regional level. They exercised extensive executive authority over their provinces, combining centralized imperial oversight with delegated local administration. Their powers and responsibilities were defined by a constitutional framework that balanced broad executive mandates with legal and institutional checks, ensuring that both imperial directives and local governance needs were met.

Provincial governors functioned as the chief executives of their regions. Their roles encompassed both symbolic representation and practical administrative control. Acting in the name of the British monarch, governors were charged with implementing imperial policies, overseeing local legislative processes, and maintaining public order. Their office served as a bridge between centralized imperial directives and the realities of regional governance.

==== Exercise of Executive Authority ====
The governor was vested with the authority to administer the province on behalf of the Crown. This position encompassed several key responsibilities. Governors could exercise administrative power directly or delegate it to subordinate officers and local administrative bodies. They were responsible for enforcing laws and policies enacted by provincial legislature, ensuring that executive actions aligned with both local and imperial objectives. Additionally, all official orders, decrees, and governmental instruments were issued in the governor's name, thereby conferring upon them formal legal validity. The governor possessed the authority to establish and enforce procedural rules aimed at ensuring effective governance. These rules structured administrative workflows by defining the allocation of responsibilities among ministers and administrative officers. Although the governor retained direct control over critical areas, many operational functions were delegated to specialized local bodies, thereby facilitating administrative decentralization.

==== Limitations and Checks on Gubernatorial Power ====
Despite their broad mandate, governors operated under specific constitutional and legal limitations. The principle of separation of powers ensured that functions assigned to courts, municipal councils, or district boards remained independent of gubernatorial control. Additionally, the actions of the governor were subject to laws enacted by the provincial legislature, which could delegate authority to local bodies in specific areas, thereby preventing an overconcentration of power in the office of the governor. Furthermore, decisions made by governors—particularly those involving individual discretion—were generally immune from judicial review, reinforcing their executive autonomy.

The relationship between the governor and the provincial legislature was characterized by a symbiotic balance of authority. Governors were permitted to exercise executive power only in matters where the provincial assembly possessed legislative competence. Although the governor retained ultimate executive authority, the legislature held the power to assign specific administrative responsibilities to local bodies or specialized agencies. Ministers were obligated to keep the governor informed on all matters of governance, particularly those of a sensitive or high-stakes nature, ensuring appropriate oversight and coordination at the provincial level.

==== Governance Structure and Ministerial Functions ====
Executive Council and Ministerial Advice

A Council of Ministers, headed by chief minister to be appointed to assist the Governor in governance. The Governor exercised full control over the appointment and dismissal of ministers and served at his pleasure. The Governor shall, in his discretion, appoint from amongst the members of the Provincial Assembly a Chief Minister, who, in his opinion, is most likely to command the confidence of the majority of the members of the Provincial Assembly. However, the Governor retained discretionary powers in specific matters. The Governor had the authority to preside over Council meetings at his discretion. If a dispute arose regarding whether a decision required the Governor's individual judgment, his decision was final and could not be legally challenged. The Governor could override the advice of the Council in areas where he had special responsibilities or where the Act granted him discretionary powers.

If a minister was not a member of the Provincial Legislature for six consecutive months, they lost their position. Ministerial salaries were decided by provincial legislation, but in the absence of such a law, the Governor determined salaries, which could not be altered during a minister's tenure. Ministerial advice to the Governor could not be questioned in court, ensuring that executive decisions remained beyond judicial scrutiny.

Financial and Operational Oversight

In addition to their political functions, governors played a significant role in financial and administrative affairs. Prior to the establishment of legislative provisions, governors held the authority to set ministerial salaries. Furthermore, the confidentiality of ministerial advice was legally safeguarded, thereby protecting executive deliberations from judicial scrutiny and reinforcing the autonomy of executive decision-making processes.

==== Special Responsibilities and Discretionary Powers ====
Provincial governors were entrusted with additional responsibilities that extended beyond routine administrative tasks. These special functions underscored the governors’ roles as both regional administrators and direct representatives of imperial authority.

Governors had the discretion to act in areas critical to maintaining provincial stability, including:

- Proactively addressing threats to peace or signs of unrest.
- Safeguarding the legal and social rights of minority communities and ensuring the entitlements of civil servants.
- Overseeing regions with unique administrative or cultural challenges to ensure stability and continuity.
- Preserving the dignity and treaty rights of Indian princely states while integrating them into the broader imperial framework.
- Enforcing lawful orders from the Governor-General and higher imperial authorities.
- Ensuring that executive decisions aligned with the objectives of legislature.

When carrying out special responsibilities, the Governor had sole discretion in decision-making. The Governor-General could issue directions to the Governor, but these directives could not be legally challenged.

In executing their responsibilities, governors often exercised considerable autonomy. They possessed the authority to override local or ministerial decisions in matters deemed essential to public order or the broader interests of the empire. Certain critical domains, such as the maintenance of law and order or the oversight of fiscal management, were classified as "reserved matters" and fell directly under gubernatorial control. During periods of crisis, governors were empowered to assume exceptional powers, enabling them to circumvent standard administrative procedures in order to respond swiftly and effectively to emerging threats.

==== Emergency Powers and Crisis Management ====
In times of crisis, the provincial governor exercised extraordinary authority. When public order was endangered by acts of violence or subversion, the governor had the power to invoke emergency measures and assume direct control over governmental functions. Emergency orders could be issued with considerable discretion, allowing for flexibility in their scope and implementation as circumstances evolved. Additionally, governors were authorized to designate officials to participate in legislative proceedings on a non-voting basis, thereby maintaining communication between the executive and legislative branches during periods of emergency.

==== Constitutional Framework and Oversight ====
The authority of provincial governors was established through formal directives issued by the Crown, known as Instruments of Instructions. These documents delineated the powers and limitations of governors and were subject to parliamentary scrutiny. The Secretary of State for India was responsible for presenting the instruments to both Houses of Parliament for review. Despite the formal constraints, governors retained considerable discretion in interpreting and implementing these directives. Their actions, even when later examined for compliance, were generally upheld.

Provincial governors functioned within a broader hierarchical framework and were not entirely autonomous. The Governor-General maintained overarching supervisory authority over provincial administrations, issuing specific instructions as needed to guide their operations. This oversight was exercised with care to avoid conflict with the directives issued by the Crown. The relationship between central and provincial authorities ensured coordination in governance, enabling governors to administer local affairs while adhering to the overarching objectives of imperial policy.

==== Oversight of Police Regulations and Intelligence ====
The governor's executive authority encompassed the oversight and regulation of police forces. This included the power to create, amend, and enforce rules governing both civil and military police units. In matters pertaining to the structure, recruitment, and disciplinary framework of these forces, the governor exercised considerable personal discretion. While direct intervention was required for significant issues, routine administrative matters were typically addressed through established institutional protocols.

To protect state security and the integrity of criminal investigations, governors retained strict control over sensitive intelligence operations. Regulations were implemented to prevent the unauthorized disclosure of operational methods and the identities of informants. The dissemination of classified information was restricted to select high-ranking officials, ensuring a need-to-know approach. Decisions concerning the handling and release of such intelligence were made solely at the governor's discretion, without the obligation for external consultation.

=== Legislative Power ===
The provincial governor in British India possessed extensive legislative authority that combined executive discretion with quasi-legislative functions. These powers were exercised under strict conditions, subject to oversight by higher imperial authorities, and were designed to ensure rapid governance while maintaining imperial control over provincial affairs. All executive actions of the Provincial Government were formally carried out in the name of the Governor. Any orders, official documents, or regulations had to be authenticated according to rules set by the Governor. Once properly issued, these documents could not be legally challenged based on procedural grounds. The Governor represented Governor-General in the legislature. The Governor also acted as the constitutional head of the Provincial Assembly.

==== Ordinance-Making Authority ====
The governor was empowered to promulgate ordinances—legal instruments carrying the same force as Acts of the Provincial Legislature—under circumstances where immediate action was required or when the legislature was not in session. However, this authority was subject to several conditions and limitations. The conditions for promulgation required that in cases where a corresponding bill would normally need prior sanction for legislative introduction, the governor was obligated to act independently without ministerial advice. Additionally, if a similar bill required the Governor-General's prior approval, the governor could not issue an ordinance unless explicitly instructed by the Governor-General. Ordinances were provisionally valid but ceased to have effect six weeks after the legislature reconvened unless formally approved, and they could be nullified earlier if the Legislative Assembly passed a resolution of disapproval with the concurrence of the Legislative Council (where applicable). They were also subject to royal disallowance by His Majesty and could be withdrawn by the governor at any time. Content limitations stipulated that any provision exceeding the constitutional authority of the Provincial Legislature was void, and in conflicts with federal laws, an ordinance was treated as if reserved for the Governor-General's assent. Ordinances typically remained in force for up to six months, with a possible single extension for another six months, contingent on notification from the Governor-General to the Secretary of State and subsequent parliamentary review.

==== Enactment of Governor’s Acts ====
Beyond ordinances, the governor could also initiate legislation directly through what were known as Governor's Acts. These measures allowed the governor to bypass conventional legislative debate when deemed necessary for the effective discharge of discretionary functions. The governor could enact legislation through two primary methods: immediate enactment, where the governor directly promulgated an Act after communicating its necessity to the provincial legislature, or draft legislation, in which a draft bill was attached to a message sent to the legislature; if the legislature failed to pass it within one month, the governor could enact the bill with or without amendments after considering legislative recommendations. Governor's Acts held the same legal authority as regular Acts but were subject to disallowance under procedures similar to those governing provincial legislation. If such an Act conflicted with federal law, it was treated as though reserved for the Governor-General's assent and rendered void without this approval, while provisions exceeding the provincial legislature's jurisdiction were automatically invalidated. Prior to enactment, the governor required the concurrence of the Governor-General, and afterward, every Governor's Act was transmitted to the Secretary of State for India and presented to both Houses of the British Parliament for review, ensuring accountability.

==== Legislative Functions and Oversight ====
In addition to direct legislative initiatives, the governor played a pivotal role in managing the workings of the Provincial Legislature. The governor had the authority to summon, prorogue, and dissolve the Provincial Legislature and, upon the presentation of a bill, could grant or withhold assent, reserve the bill for the Governor-General's consideration, or return it with recommendations for amendments. Bills reserved for the Governor-General followed a parallel process involving the possibility of royal assent or further reservation for the King's pleasure. The governor could also address the Legislative Assembly directly or, in bicameral provinces, either chamber individually or jointly, thereby setting legislative priorities, and was authorized to send formal messages compelling timely consideration of specific issues. Beyond guiding legislative agendas, the governor established rules to prevent dual membership between provincial and federal legislatures, oversaw procedures for vacating seats, appointed temporary presiding officers, and administered oaths for new legislators, ensuring continuity and safeguarding the integrity of the legislative process. Additionally, the governor exercised veto-like powers over legislation, particularly in financial matters, and could reject provincial laws conflicting with national interests or security concerns. Even after a bill's passage, imperial oversight persisted, as His Majesty retained the power to disallow any provincial law within 12 months, reinforcing hierarchical control over provincial governance. The governor had the authority to appoint a temporary presiding officer if the Speaker's role was vacant or the Speaker was absent. Speaker, deputy speaker, chief minister or any member of the parliament had to submit their mandatory notice periods or resignations to the governor.

==== Financial Oversight and Budgetary Authority ====
The governor's legislative powers encompassed fiscal management and budgetary control, including the presentation of annual financial statements to the provincial legislature that differentiated between "charged expenditures" (not subject to legislative debate) and "voted expenditures" (requiring legislative approval). Following parliamentary deliberations, the governor authenticated the final schedule of grants and retained the authority to restore part or all of reduced or refused critical grants to their originally proposed amounts. Supplementary financial statements for unforeseen expenses also fell under the governor's responsibilities. Additionally, the governor exercised control over fiscal legislation by mandating their recommendation for any bill proposing new or increased charged expenditures, ensuring such measures aligned with imperial priorities and the governor's special responsibilities.

==== Discretionary Powers ====
The governor's role combined both constitutional and executive functions, with a strong emphasis on discretion and intervention in matters deemed critical:

- Protection of Minority Interests: A special responsibility of the governor was to protect minority communities. This authority enabled him to override legislative decisions that threatened the interests of these groups, often serving as a justification for financial or procedural interventions.
- Control Over Administrative and Security Matters: The governor maintained direct control over police regulations, including the organization, discipline, and implementation of special security measures during public order crises. He was also responsible for establishing rules for administrative operations, structuring ministerial responsibilities, and ensuring that key provincial issues were reported directly to him.
- Procedural Rule-Making: The governor held the authority to establish and modify rules for legislative procedures, particularly in joint sittings of bicameral legislatures, ensuring that debates and discussions reflected both provincial interests and imperial oversight. He could also intervene in legislative debates to certify contentious expenditures or override procedural norms if necessary.

==== Integration of Executive and Legislative Roles ====
In British India, the governor functioned as both the executive head and a quasi-legislative authority. All official documents, orders, and regulations were issued in the governor's name, and once properly authenticated, they were beyond challenge on procedural grounds. This dual role reinforced the integration of executive and legislative functions, ensuring that provincial governance was both responsive to local needs and consistent with overarching imperial policies.

The framework established under the Government of India Act provided the governor with significant power to guide provincial legislation while remaining subject to a hierarchy of oversight. By combining direct legislative actions with robust financial and procedural controls, the governor ensured that provincial laws were aligned with national interests and the priorities of the British Crown.

=== Judicial Power ===
The province had an Advocate-General, appointed by the Governor:

- Qualifications: The Advocate-General had to be qualified to serve as a High Court judge.
- Duties: The Advocate-General provided legal advice to the government and carried out duties assigned by the Governor.
- Tenure and Salary: The Advocate-General served at the Governor's pleasure, with a salary determined by the Governor.

== Governor's Rule 1954 ==
Background

Legislative elections were held in East Bengal between 8 and 12 March 1954, the first since Pakistan became an independent country in 1947. The opposition United Front led by the All-Pakistan Awami League and Krishak Sramik Party won a landslide victory with 223 of the 309 seats. The Muslim League Chief Minister of East Pakistan Nurul Amin was defeated in his own constituency by Khaleque Nawaz Khan by over 7,000 votes, with all the Muslim League ministers losing their seats.

Governor's Rule

The central government of Pakistan moved decisively to dismantle the democratically elected provincial government, employing fabricated allegations of communist sympathies to justify authoritarian intervention. The United Front ministry and the Legislative Assembly were dissolved and East Bengal was put under direct governor's rule by Governor-General Malik Ghulam Muhammad on May 30. Prime Minister Bogra emphasized to the US that Fazlul Huq's administration could not be trusted to manage security risks, citing fears that sensitive information might leak to Soviet or Chinese officials through Huq's cabinet. The first action under Governor's Rule involved arresting prominent opposition figures labeled as communist though martial law was to be avoided unless absolutely necessary.

Appointment

Iskander Mirza was appointed as the governor of East Bengal to oversee the transition to direct central control. Mirza, a senior civil servant and former Defense Secretary, was appointed Governor of East Bengal. Mirza, who had prior administrative experience in Bengal and born in Murshidabad, Bengal, was chosen strategically to mitigate perceptions of outsider imposition. He was urgently recalled from medical treatment in London to assume the role despite protests from his doctors.

Policy Measures Under Governor's Rule

The Government of Pakistan announced a two-pronged strategy to consolidate control over East Pakistan: psychological and economic initiatives. A significant emphasis was placed on countering what the central government labeled as communist threats, despite the lack of credible evidence supporting these claims. The administration planned to intensify propaganda efforts by establishing two new radio stations in East Bengal and expanding its informational outreach. The importance of these measures was highlighted in a secret telegram sent by the U.S. Chargé in Pakistan, Emmerson, which detailed the government's plan to arrest alleged communists and enhance psychological operations to solidify control over East Pakistan.

On the economic front, the government aimed to win public support by ensuring the availability of essential commodities such as food, cloth, kerosene, mustard oil, and salt at subsidized rates.

Aftermath

The long-term goal, as stated by officials, was to restore parliamentary governance within a year. However, the immediate impact of governor's rule was widespread political repression, with around 1,600 united Front leaders and activists, including 30 members of the legislature, being arrested. The Awami League, however, returned to power on its own on 30 August 1956 with Ataur Rahman Khan as chief minister, but only to resign a few months later.

== List of Governors ==
=== Governors of East Bengal ===
Political Party

Muslim League
Independent

Legend

Acting Governor

List of Governors of East Bengal
| # | Portrait | Governor | Term of office | | | Political Party | Governor General/ President |
| # | Portrait | Governor | Term start | Term end | Time in office | Political Party | Governor General/ President |
|---|---|---|---|---|---|---|---|
| 1 | | Sir; Frederick Chalmers Bourne (1891–1977) | 15 August 1947 | 5 April 1950 | 2 years, 233 days | Independent (British Administrator) | Muhammad Ali Jinnah Khawaja Nazimuddin |
| [-] | | Justice A.S.M. Akram (acting) (Note: A.S.M. Akram was appointed Acting Governor during the leave of absence of Sir Frederick Chalmers Bourne) (1888–1968) | 16 March 1949 | 25 April 1949 | 40 days | Independent | Khawaja Nazimuddin |
| 2 | | Sir; Feroz Khan Noon (1893–1970) | 5 April 1950 | 26 March 1953 | 2 years, 355 days | Muslim League | Khawaja Nazimuddin Malik Ghulam Muhammad |
| [-] | | Abdur Rahman Siddiqui (acting) (Note: Abdur Rahman Siddiqui was appointed Acting Governor during the leave of absence of Feroz Khan Noon) (1887–1953) | 25 July 1952 | 10 November 1952 | 108 days | Muslim League | Malik Ghulam Muhammad |
| 3 | | Chaudhry Khaliquzzaman (1889–1973) | 4 April 1953 | 30 May 1954 (Note: With the dismissal of the Third Huq ministry in East Bengal, Governor General Malik Ghulam Muhammad decided to enforce Governor's Rule in the province and appointed Iskander Mirza as Governor) | 1 year, 56 days | Muslim League | Malik Ghulam Muhammad |
| 4 | | Major General; Iskander Mirza (1899–1969) | 30 May 1954 | 21 September 1954 | 114 days | Muslim League | Malik Ghulam Muhammad |
| [-] | | Justice; Sir Thomas Hobart Ellis (acting) (Note: Thomas Hobart Ellis was appointed acting Governor when Iskander Mirza was taken into the central cabinet as Minister) (1894–1981) | Appointment: 21 September 1954 Sworn in: 25 October 1954 | 22 December 1954 | 92 days | Independent | Malik Ghulam Muhammad |
| [-] | | Justice Muhammad Shahabuddin (acting) (Note: Muhammad Shahabuddin was appointed after Acting Governor after Thomas Hobart Ellis) (1895–1971) | 22 December 1954 | 14 June 1955 (Note: Justice Shahabuddin resigned due to differences of opinion about the restoration of parliamentary government in East Bengal) | 174 days | Independent | Malik Ghulam Muhammad |
| [-] | | Justice Amiruddin Ahmad (acting) (Note: Ahmad was appointed acting Governor on the resignation of Justice Muhammad Shahabuddin) (1895–1965) | 14 June 1955 | As Governor of East Bengal: 14 October 1955 As Governor of East Pakistan: 9 March 1956 | As Governor of East Bengal: 122 days As Governor of Eastern Wing: 269 days | Independent | Malik Ghulam Muhammad Iskander Mirza |

=== Governors of East Pakistan ===
In late 1955, the prime minister Mohammad Ali Bogra initiated the One Unit policy which resulted in East Bengal province being renamed to East Pakistan.

Political Party

Muslim League
Krishak Sramik Party
Independent
- Military Governor

Legend

Acting Governor
Functioned and exercised power as Governor by the order of president without being appointed as one

List of Governors of East Pakistan
| # | Portrait | Governor | Term of office | | | Affiliation | President |
| # | Portrait | Governor | Term start | Term end | Time in office | Affiliation | President |
|---|---|---|---|---|---|---|---|
| [-] | | Justice Amiruddin Ahmad (acting) (Note: Justice Amiruddin Ahmad, Chief Justice of Dhaka High Court, was appointed acting Governor on the resignation of Justice Muhammad Shahabuddin) (1895–1965) | As Governor of East Pakistan: 14 October 1955 As Governor of East Bengal: June 14, 1955 | 9 March 1956 | As Governor of East Pakistan: 147 days As Governor of Eastern Wing : 269 days | Independent | Iskander Mirza |
| 1 | | Sher-e-Bangla; A. K. Fazlul Huq (1873–1962) | 9 March 1956 | 31 March 1958 (Note: President Iskander Mirza removed A. K. Fazlul Huq as governor on 31 March 1958 on the advice of the Noon cabinet for allegedly overstepping his limits as a constitutional Governor. Huq had dismissed Ataur Rahman's Ministry of Awami League that had not been defeated on the floor of the House, and had installed Mr. Abu Hussain Sarkar of his own party Krishak Sramik Party as Chief Minister.) | 2 years, 22 days | Krishak Sramik Party | Iskander Mirza |
| [-] | | Muhammad Hamid Ali (acting) (Note: Muhammad Hamid Ali, Chief Secretary to the Governor of East Pakistan, was appointed Acting Governor in pursuance of the provisions of Article 70 of the Constitution following the removal of Sher-e-Bangla A. K. Fazlul Huq from the office) (1906–1972) | 1 April 1958 | 3 May 1958 | 32 days | Independent | Iskander Mirza |
| 2 | | Sultanuddin Ahmad (1902–1977) | Appointment: 26 April 1958 Sworn in: 3 May 1958 | 10 October 1958 (Note: Sultanuddin Ahmad was removed from office on 10 October 1958 soon after the promulgation of Martial Law in Pakistan on 7 October) | 160 days | Independent | Iskander Mirza |
| 3 | | Zakir Husain (1898–1971) | Appointment: 10 October 1958 Sworn in: 11 October 1958 | 14 April 1960 | 1 year, 186 days | Independent | Iskander Mirza Ayub Khan |
| 4 | | Lieutenant General Azam Khan (1908–1994) | 15 April 1960 | 10 May 1962 | 2 years, 25 days | Military | Ayub Khan |
| [-] | | Syed Hashim Raza (acting) (Note: Syed Hashim Raza was Acting Governor of the province during the absence of General Azam Khan's official visit to West Germany) (1910–2003) | 1 July 1961 | 5 August 1961 | 35 days | Independent | Ayub Khan |
| 5 | | Ghulam Faruque Khan (1899–1992) | 11 May 1962 | 25 October 1962 (Note: Unable to cope with the political problems of East Pakistan, Ghulam Faruque Khan resigned from office.) | 167 days | Independent | Ayub Khan |
| 6 | | Abdul Monem Khan (1899–1971) | 28 October 1962 | 23 March 1969 | 6 years, 146 days (Longest Serving) | Muslim League | Ayub Khan |
| 7 | | Mirza Nurul Huda (1919–1991) | 23 March 1969 | 25 March 1969 (Note: With the promulgation of Martial Law throughout Pakistan and the abrogation of the constitution in the evening of 25 March, Mirza Nurul Huda's tenure of governorship came to an abrupt end after just 60 hours.) | 2 days | Independent | Ayub Khan |
| 8 | | Major General Muzaffaruddin (Note: On 25 March 1969 General Yahya Khan proclaimed martial law and divided the country into two administrative zones: West Pakistan (Zone 'A') and East Pakistan (Zone 'B'). Muzaffaruddin was the General Officer Commanding of the 14th Division and became Martial Law Administrator, Zone 'B'. On 8 April 1969, Yahya Khan issued an order directing that the Martial Law Administrators of Zone 'A' and 'B' would perform the functions and powers of the Governors of West and East Pakistan respectively. Thus Muzaffaruddin became Martial Law Administrator and also exercised the powers and functions of Governor of East Pakistan.) (Martial Law Administrator) | 25 March 1969 | 23 August 1969 | 151 days | Military | Yahya Khan |
| 9 | | Lieutenant General Sahabzada Yaqub Khan (Note: Appointed as Martial Law Administrator of Zone 'B' and exercised the powers and functions of the Governor of East Pakistan.) (1920–2016) (Martial Law Administrator) | 23 August 1969 | 1 September 1969 (Note: On 8 April 1969, President Yahya Khan issued an order directing that the Martial Law Administrators would perform the functions and powers of the Governor. However, a notification issued by the cabinet secretariat on 1 September 1969 cancelled the order of 8 April 1969 and directed Martial Law Administrators to refrain from performing the functions of Governor in their respective provinces with immediate effect. Lt. General Yaqub Khan remained Martial Law Administrator until Vice Admiral S. M. Ahsan took over as the new Governor of East Pakistan on 1 September 1969) | 9 days | Military | Yahya Khan |
| 10 | | Vice Admiral S. M. Ahsan (1921–1989) | 1 September 1969 | 1 March 1971 | 1 year, 181 days | Navy | Yahya Khan |
| 11 | | Lieutenant General Sahabzada Yaqub Khan (Note: Appointed the "head of civil administration in the province" and exercised the functions and powers of Governor from 1 March 1971 until the arrival of Lieutenant General Tikka Khan on 7 March 1971.) (1920–2016) (Head of Civil Administration) | 1 March 1971 | 7 March 1971 | 6 days | Military | Yahya Khan |
| 12 | | Lieutenant General Tikka Khan (1915–2002) | Appointment: 6 March 1971 Sworn in: 7 March 1971 Officially announced: 9 March 1971 | 3 September 1971 | 180 days | Military | Yahya Khan |
| 13 | | Abdul Motaleb Malik (1905–1977) | Appointment: 31 August 1971 Sworn in: 3 September 1971 | 14 December 1971 (Note: Abdul Motaleb Malik along with his cabinet resigned on 14 December after realizing that Pakistani defeat was imminent and sought refuse in Hotel Intercontinental, seeking the protection of the Red Cross flag.) | 102 days | Muslim League | Yahya Khan |
| 14 | | Lieutenant General A. A. K. Niazi (Note: Commander of the Eastern Command of the Pakistan Army and as the supreme authority of Pakistan in its eastern wing, functioned and exercised power as the Governor of East Pakistan after the resignation of Abdul Motaleb Malik during the last 48 hours of Bangladesh Liberation War) (1915–2004) (Supreme Authority of East Pakistan) | 14 December 1971 | 16 December 1971 | 2 days | Military | Yahya Khan |
