= Government of Bengal =

Government of Bengal may refer to:

- Government of Bangladesh
- Government of East Bengal
- Government of West Bengal

== See also ==
- Governor of Bengal, a British official from 1690 until Independence in 1947
