= Sultanuddin Ahmad =

Bengali politician and diplomat and Governor of East Pakistan (1902–1977)

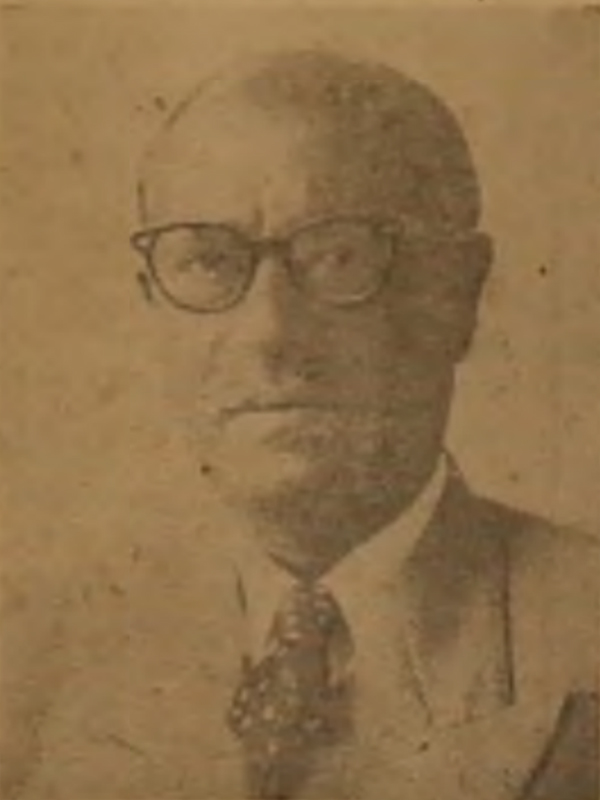

3rd Governor of East Pakistan
- In office 3 May 1958 – 10 October 1958
- Preceded by: Muhammad Hamid Ali (acting)
- Succeeded by: Zakir Husain

Personal details
- Born: 1902 Munshiganj, Bengal, British India
- Died: 12 January 1977 (aged 74) Dacca, Bangladesh
- Party: Awami League

Sultanuddin Ahmad (1902 – 8 April 1977) was a Bengali politician and diplomat who served as the governor of East Pakistan.

== Early life ==
Sultanuddin Ahmad was born in 1902 in Munshiganj, Bengal Presidency. He obtained his B.A. degree in 1922, M.A. degree in 1924, and B.L. degree in 1926 from the University of Dhaka. During his student life, he was elected Vice President of Student Union of Salimullah Muslim Hall (1924–1925).

== Career ==
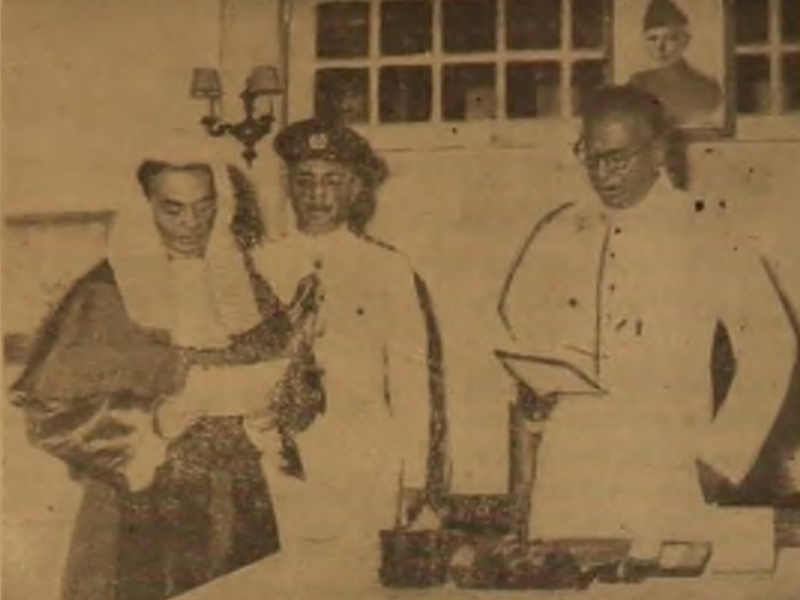
Sultanuddin Ahmad Taking oath

He started his law practice in Dhaka in 1927. He was a lecturer in the Department of Law at the Dhaka University, as well as the treasurer and a member of both the Executive Council and the Academic Council. He also served as the acting Vice-Chancellor of the University of Dhaka three times for short periods. From 1944 to 1950, he served as the Public Prosecutor of East Pakistan, and from 1950 to 1952, he was the Legal Remembrancer of the East Pakistan government. Mr. Ahmad was actively involved in the Samabaya movement; he served as the Director and Deputy Chairman of the Dhaka Central Samabaya Bank and was also a Director of the State Bank of Pakistan for four years.

He was the assistant secretary of the Muslim League. In 1943 he was elected to the Bengal Legislative Assembly and served until 1947. He was appointed ambassador of Pakistan to Myanmar in 1952 after the partition of India. In April 1953 he was appointed as ambassador to China. On 26 April 1958 he appointed the governor of East Pakistan, taking his oath on the 3 May. The Chief Justice of the High Court of Dhaka, Justice Amin Ahmed, administered the oath at the Governor's House, while the province's Home Secretary, Mr. A. Q. Ansari, read out the appointment letter. After the oath-taking ceremony, the Chief Minister of East Pakistan, Ataur Rahman Khan, introduced his cabinet members to the Governor.

Zakir Hossain succeeded him as the governor. From January 1959 to January 1964 he served as the ambassador of Pakistan to Indonesia. During 1964-65 he was part of Pakistan's delegation to the United Nations General Assembly.

== Death ==
He died on 8 April 1977. Ahmad was soft-spoken, hospitable, and a scholarly personality.
