= Zakir Husain (governor) =

Pakistani politician

- জাকির হোসেন ذاکِر حسین
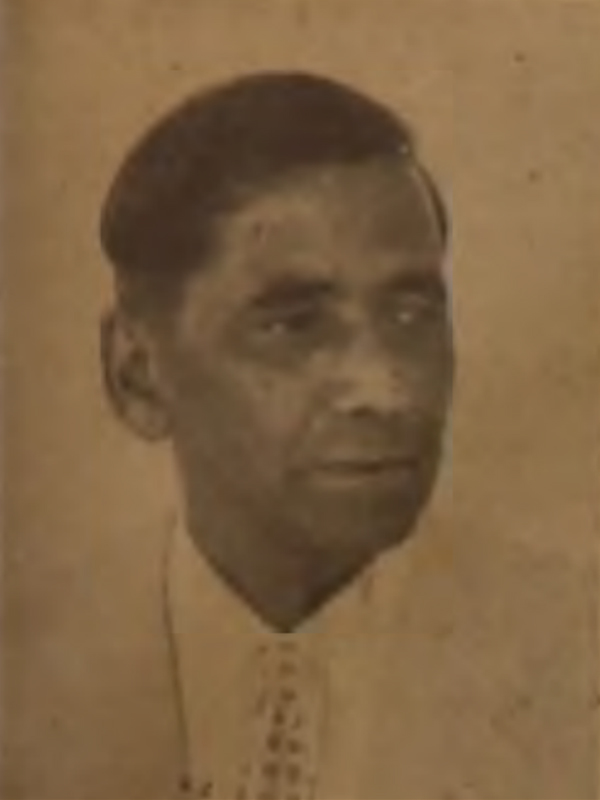

10th Interior Minister of Pakistan
- In office 14 June 1960 – 8 June 1962
- Preceded by: Khalid Masud Sheikh
- Succeeded by: Khan Habibullah Khan

4th Governor of East Pakistan
- In office 10 October 1958 – 14 April 1960
- Preceded by: Sultanuddin Ahmad
- Succeeded by: Azam Khan

Personal details
- Born: 2 November 1898 Rangunia, Chittagong, Bengal, British India
- Died: 24 May 1971 (aged 73) Chittagong, East Pakistan, Pakistan
- Party: Muslim League
- Children: 3 sons and 3 daughters
- Education: Aligarh Muslim University; Dhaka University

Military service
- Years of service: 1922–1952
- Rank: Sworn in as an officer - 1922; Inspector-General - 1947

Zakir Husain (Bengali: জাকির হোসেন, Urdu: ذاکِر حسین) IP, JP, PSP, IGP, (2 November 1897 – 24 May 1971) was a Pakistani politician who served as the governor of East Pakistan and Interior Minister of Pakistan, both in the President Ayub Khan military regime.

== Early life ==
Zakir Husain was born on 2 November 1897 in Ghatchek, Rangunia, Chittagong. After his primary schooling in Rangunia, Chittagong, he was a student of Chittagong Collegiate School. He graduated from Aligarh Muslim University and Dhaka University.

== Career ==
He was the first Indian Muslim to qualify for the Imperial Police Service of India in 1920. He joined the Indian Police Service in 26 September 1923 and during his career in the police service, he served at various places in the erstwhile East Bengal and was special superintendent of police intelligence in Aligarh. He received Indian Police Medal in 1940. In 1943, he was appointed Shipping Master of Calcutta Port. After the Second World War, at the time of the partition of India in 1 April 1947, he was the Deputy Inspector General of Police of Presidency Range, Calcutta. He like many other Muslims opted for Pakistan and was appointed the first Inspector General of Police of East Pakistan in August 1947. He was a recipient of the Quaid-e-Azam Police Medal. He was a member of the committee formed by government of East Pakistan to reorganize the police forces. In 1952 he became the chairman of the Federal Public Service Commission. He retired from government service in 1957.

== Later career ==
During the language movement in 1952, he was the Inspector General of Police, East Pakistan. After his retirement from Police Service in 1952, he was appointed the Chairman, Federal Public Service Commission of Pakistan for five years. It was during his chairmanship that the proportional representation in the different services (CSP, PSP, PFS etc.) of the provinces of Pakistan was adopted. Zakir Husain was appointed Governor of East Pakistan on 10 October 1958. He took oath of office on 11 October and continued as Governor till 14 April 1960, During his governorship which spanned over nearly one and half years, he tried his best to make Basic Democracy popular in East Pakistan and worked hard in the February 1960 elections for President Ayub Khan. The price of essential items came down and smuggling was also checked. However, since he was the representative of a Martial Law regime, he became soon unpopular.

In 1961 appointed the central minister for Home & Kashmir Affairs of Pakistan. He returned to Chittagong in 1964, and retired from active politics.

He initiated many important institutions during his working life. His first was the establishment of Faujdarhat Cadet College, and Colonel Gibson, who retired as Director General of the East Pakistan Rifles, was appointed the first principal. Among others, he initiated the building of the 500-bed Chittagong Medical College Hospital, Chittagong University, Chittagong Women's College, Chittagong New Market, and the establishment of Rangunia College from a school. He also established Begum Iqbal Zakir Husain School, a Women's College in Rangunia now. Two major city roads have been named after him, Zakir Husain Road in Chittagong and in Dhaka.

== Personal life ==
Late Zakir Husain was married to Feroza, daughter of Khan Bahadur Aman Ali of Bakalia (Laldigi East). He had three sons, Zahid, Adil and Shahid Husain and three daughters, Zehra[fateha], Zeenat and Farida. He was hobbyist for gardens and farm and regularly played tennis and gulti.

== Death ==
During the liberation struggle, on 9 April 1971, the Pakistan army attacked his home on a hilltop in Chittagong, killing most of his guards and servants. He and his eldest son Zahid Husain who was at that time with him, were lined up to be shot and were pushed down the hill when the commanding officer arrived and stopped them. The first floor of the house was destroyed by mortar attack, so he was taken in as the guest of Mr. M.M. Ispahani for a few days. He returned to his house after a while after some Bihari settlers who had in the meantime occupied it, were evicted. He died on 24 May 1971. Curfew was lifted for a few hours so that his funeral could take place at the Laldighi Maidan in Chittagong. He was buried next to his second wife's grave, adjacent to Graribullah Shah's Mazaar & Mosque in Chittagong.

Political offices
Preceded by Sultanuddin Ahmad	Governor of East Pakistan; 1958–1960	Succeeded by Azam Khan
Preceded by Jalal Baba	Interior Minister of Pakistan; 1962–1965	Succeeded by Khan Habibullah Khan
