= Amiruddin Ahmad =

Pakistani jurist and Governor of East Pakistan

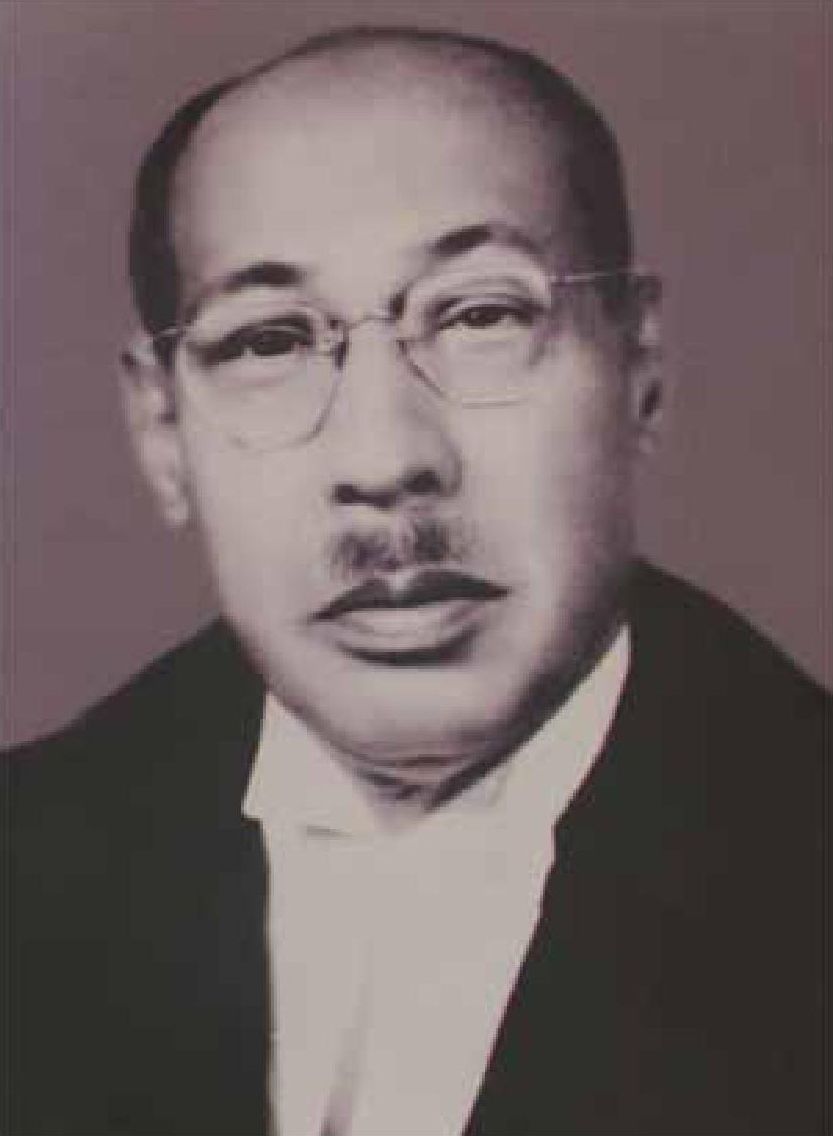

1st Governor of East Pakistan
- In office 14 June 1955 – 9 March 1956
- Preceded by: Muhammad Shahabuddin (As Governor of East Bengal)
- Succeeded by: A. K. Fazlul Huq

Personal details
- Born: 22 December 1895
- Died: 1960s

Amiruddin Ahmad (22 December 1895-1960s) was a Pakistani jurist who served as the governor of East Pakistan.

== Early life ==
Ahmad was born on 22 December 1895 in West Bengal. He joined as the Deputy Legal Remembrancer of Bengal on 1 April 1942.

== Career ==
Ahmad was elevated to additional judge of the Calcutta High Court on 6 January 1947. After the partition of India, he moved to East Pakistan. On 15 August 1947 was made a judge of the Dhaka High Court. He was one of three justices on the Rawalpindi conspiracy Tribunal in Hyderabad, Sindh. On 10 November 1953, he was made the chairman of the Boundary Commission. On 22 September 1954 he was made the Chief Justice of Dhaka High Court. On 14 June 1955 he was appointed Acting Governor of East Bengal. On 9 March 1956, he was appointed a judge in the Federal Court of Pakistan.
