= Muhammad Hamid Ali =

Pakistani politician

Syed Muhammad Hamid Ali سید محمد حامد علی
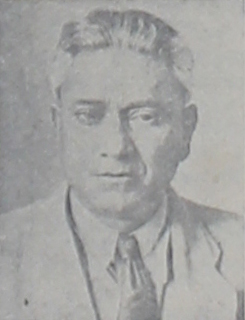

Governor of East Pakistan
- Acting; 1 April 1958 – 3 May 1958
- Preceded by: A. K. Fazlul Huq
- Succeeded by: Sultanuddin Ahmad

Personal details
- Born: 4 September 1906 Lucknow, United Provinces of Agra and Oudh, British India
- Died: 2 January 1972 (aged 65) Karachi, Sindh, Pakistan
- Children: 4
- Parent: Syed Mohd Hashmat Ali Saheeb

Muhammad Hamid Ali was a Pakistani civil servant who served as an interim Governor of East Pakistan.

== Early life ==
Ali was born in Lucknow, United Provinces of Agra and Oudh, British Raj on 4 September 1906. On 13 October 1931 he joined the Indian Civil Service.

== Career ==
He was posted to subdivisions and districts in various posts in India. He served as the deputy transport commissioner and deputy secretary. On 28 January 1946 he was the joint secretary in the office of the Prime Minister. On 14 November 1946 he was promoted to additional secretary. On 15 August 1947 he joined the Government of East Bengal as secretary of the Department of Finance and Revenue. He was promoted to chief secretary.

From 1 April 1958 to 3 May 1958, he was the acting governor of East Pakistan. After his term ended he returned to his post of Chief Secretary.
