= Muzaffaruddin =

Pakistani politician

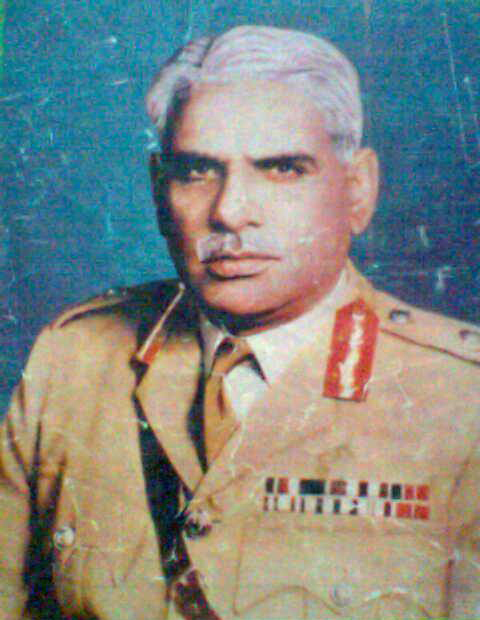

9th Governor of East Pakistan
- In office 25 March 1969 – 23 August 1969
- Preceded by: Mirza Nurul Huda
- Succeeded by: Sahabzada Yaqub Khan

Military service
- Allegiance: Pakistan
- Branch/service: Pakistan Army
- Years of service: 1939-1975
- Rank: Major General
- Commands: 14 Infantry Division (East Pakistan)

Muzaffaruddin was a Pakistan Army officer and governor of East Pakistan. He belonged to the distinguished Thathalan/Thathal family of Muslim Gujjars in Hoshiarpur district.

== Career ==
On 26 March 1969 General Yahya Khan declared martial law and made General Muzaffaruddin the Chief Martial Law Administrator of East Pakistan. Muzaffaruddin was then the General Officer Commanding of East Pakistan's 14th Infantry Division. From 25 March 1969 to 23 August 1969 he was also the acting governor of East Pakistan. He was made chairman of the Agricultural Development Corporation of West Pakistan. General Muzaffar ud din belong to Gujjar family. Son in Law Babai koom Gujjar Khan Bahadur Molvi Fetah ud din Gujjar founder gujjar gazzat and gujjar organization Anjumen - e- gujjran . General Muzaffar Ud Din Son Dr. Mazahar Ud Din Medical Superintendent Ganga Ram Hospital. Son in Law Chaudhry Abdul Majid Director Social Secorty Punjab
