= Thomas Hobart Ellis =

Governor of East Pakistan in 1954

Sir Thomas Hobart Ellis
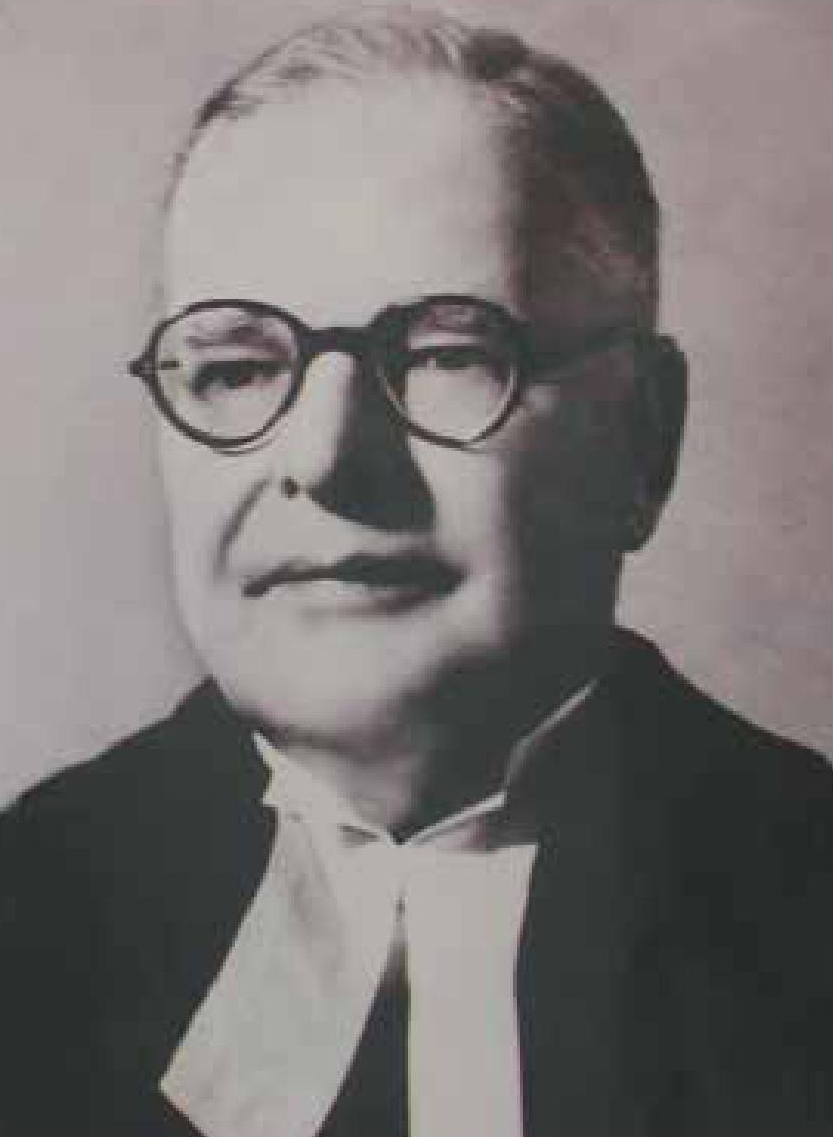

Governor of East Pakistan
- In office 21 September 1954 – 22 December 1954

Sir Thomas Hobart Ellis (11 October 1894 – 12 December 1981) was the Governor of East Pakistan from 21 September 1954 to 22 December 1954.

== Early life ==
Ellis was born on 11 October 1894 in Farsley, City of Leeds metropolitan borough, West Yorkshire, England.

== Career ==
He graduated from Manchester Grammar School and The Queen's College, Oxford. In 1919 he joined the Indian Civil Service and served in a number of local government posts. In August 1938 he became the Additional District and Sessions Judge of Jessore. The same year he was made the Chairman of Conciliation Board. In 1942 he was made the Special Officer of Air Raid Precaution in Bengal.

From 1944 to 1947, he was the Additional Judge of Calcutta High Court and from 1947 to 1953 the East Bengal High Court. He was in charge of a probe body that investigated police action during the Language Movement of 1952. From 1953 to 1954 he was Chief Justice of East Bengal High Court. In January 1953 he was made a Knight Bachelor by the British Government.

== Later years ==
He did not marry. He had a brother and 2 sisters, one of whom was called Sally. In retirement, he lived with Sally in Northenden, Manchester.
