= Muzaffar Ali Khan Qizilbash =

Pakistani politician

Nawab Sir Muzaffar Ali Khan Qizilbash

3rd Chief Minister of West Pakistan
- In office 18 March 1958 – 7 October 1958
- Governor: Akhter Husain
- Preceded by: Sardar Abdur Rashid Khan
- Succeeded by: Last

9th Minister of Finance
- In office 4 August 1969 – 22 February 1971
- President: Yahya Khan
- Preceded by: S. M. Ahsan
- Succeeded by: Mubashir Hassan

Personal details
- Party: Republican Party

Nawab Sir Muzaffar Ali Khan Qizilbash (Urdu: نواب مظفر علی خان قزلباش; born 1908) was a Pakistani politician from the Punjab and a minister in the governments of the Punjab, West Pakistan and Pakistan. Muzaffar Qizilbash started his legislative career as a Unionist, later joining the Muslim League and subsequently the Republican Party. He later served as Minister for Industries in the cabinet of Prime Minister Ibrahim Ismail Chundrigar (Muslim League) from 18 October 1957 – 16 December 1957. Afterwards, he served as Minister for Industries, Commerce and Parliamentary Affairs in the cabinet of Prime Minister Feroz Khan Noon (Republican) from 16 December 1957 – 18 March 1958, when he was appointed Chief Minister of West Pakistan.

His successor as Minister for Industries and Commerce was Sardar Abdur Rashid Khan, the incumbent Chief Minister of West Pakistan, while the Parliamentary Affairs portfolio was assigned to Sardar Amir Azam Khan. Qizilbash was later Chief Minister of West Pakistan from March 1958 - 7 October 1958 when the cabinet was dismissed on the declaration of martial law by President Iskander Mirza.

After the fall of the Ayub Khan government, Qizilbash served as Finance Minister of Pakistan in the presidential cabinet of President and Chief Martial Law Administrator General Agha Muhammad Yahya Khan from 4 August 1969 – 22 February 1971. Shahtaj Qizilbash was a niece of Muzaffar Qizilbash. He owned the historically significant Nisar Haveli in the Walled City of Lahore after the Independence of Pakistan in 1947.

Political offices
Preceded by Sardar Abdur Rashid Khan	Chief Minister of West Pakistan; 1958	Succeeded by Office abolished
Preceded by S. M. Ahsan	Finance Minister of Pakistan; 1969 – 1971	Succeeded by Mubashar Hassan
