= Abdur Rashid Khan (politician) =

Pakistani politician

Sardar Abdur Rashid Khan HQA, OBE

Minister of Interior, Kashmir Affairs, States and Frontier Regions
- In office 4 August 1969 – 22 February 1971
- President: General Yahya Khan
- Preceded by: Abdul Qayyum Khan
- Succeeded by: Zulfikar Ali Bhutto

Minister for Commerce and Industries
- In office 29 March 1958 – 7 October 1958
- President: Iskander Mirza
- Prime Minister: Feroz Khan Noon

Chief Minister of West Pakistan
- In office 16 July 1957 – 18 March 1958
- Preceded by: Khan Abdul Jabbar Khan
- Succeeded by: Muzaffar Ali Khan Qizilbash

Minister for Health, Finance and Information of West Pakistan
- In office 1955–1957

Chief Minister of the North-West Frontier Province
- In office 23 April 1953 – 18 July 1955
- Preceded by: Abdul Qayyum Khan
- Succeeded by: Sardar Bahadur Khan

Personal details
- Born: 1906 Dera Ismail Khan
- Died: 1995 (aged 88–89)
- Party: Republican Party
- Awards: Hilal-e-Quaid-e-Azam (1969)

Sardar Abdur Rashid Khan, HQA, OBE (Urdu: سردار عبد الرشید خان) (1906 – 1995) was a senior police officer from the Khyber Pakhtunkhwa province and cabinet minister in Pakistan.

== Early life ==
Born in Dera Ismail Khan, Sardar Rashid was educated at Islamia College Peshawar.

== Professional life ==
He then joined the Indian Police Service (IP) and was serving as the Deputy Superintendent of Police in Peshawar City when Pakistan became an independent country on 14 August 1947. He was one of the senior most police officers in the newly-emergent country.

Sardar Rashid rose to become the Inspector General of Khyber Pakhtunkhwa Police, but resigned from the police service on April 23, 1953, when he was appointed as the 8th Chief Minister of Khyber Pakhtunkhwa (then name North West Frontier Province). His nomination was controversial in that he was handpicked by his predecessor Abdul Qayyum Khan. However, he proved to be a popular choice, and in November 1953, he was elected as the provincial president of the Muslim League despite the efforts of Abdul Qayyum Khan to retain the post for himself following his elevation to the Central Government.

He remained Chief Minister until 18 July 1955, when he was forced to resign because of his opposition to the ""One Unit Scheme"". He was succeeded by Sardar Bahadur Khan (older brother of General Ayub Khan) who secured approval from the provincial assembly for the controversial scheme.

Sardar Rashid joined the Republican Party and was elected as a Member of the West Pakistan Assembly when the ""One Unit Scheme"" came into effect, and served in the cabinet of Dr Khan Sahib initially as Minister for Health and later as Minister for Finance and Information.

On the resignation of Dr Khan Sahib in July 1957, Sardar Rashid was elected as the second Chief Minister of West Pakistan. He resigned from this position on 18 March 1958, and was succeeded by Nawab Muzaffar Ali Khan Qizilbash.

Sardar Rashid (Republican) served as Minister for Commerce and Industries in the cabinet of Prime Minister Sir Feroz Khan Noon (Republican) from 29 March 1958 - 7 October 1958, when the cabinet was dismissed on the declaration of Martial Law by President Iskander Mirza.

After the fall of the Ayub Khan government, Sardar Abdur Rashid served as Minister for Home Affairs (Interior), Kashmir Affairs, States, and Frontier Regions in the presidential cabinet of President and Chief Martial Law Administrator General Yahya Khan from 4 August 1969 - 22 February 1971.

Political offices
Preceded by Abdul Qayyum Khan	Chief Minister of Khyber Pakhtunkhwa; 1953 – 1955	Succeeded by Sardar Bahadur Khan
Preceded by Khan Abdul Jabbar Khan	Chief Minister of West Pakistan; 1957 – 1958	Succeeded by Muzaffar Ali Khan Qizilbash
Preceded by Abdul Hamid Khan	Interior Minister of Pakistan; 1969 – 1972	Succeeded by Zulfikar Ali Bhutto
