= Republican Party (Pakistan) =

Political party in Pakistan

Pakistan Republican Party
- Urdu name: پاکستان ریپبلکن پارٹی
- Bengali name: পাকিস্তান রিপাবলিকান পার্টি
- Abbreviation: RP
- Leader: Feroz Khan Noon
- President: Khan Abdul Jabbar Khan
- General Secretary: Syed Abid Hussain Shah
- Vice-president: Iskander Mirza
- Founder: Khan Abdul Jabbar Khan
- Founded: 23 April 1956
- Dissolved: 7 October 1958
- Split from: PML
- Merged into: PML(C)
- Ideology: Secularism; Republicanism; West Pakistani interest
- Political position: Centre-right
- Federal Assembly (1957): 21 / 80
- West Pakistan Provincial Assembly (1956): 156 / 310

The Pakistan Republican Party was formed in 23 April 1956, by a break away faction of the Pakistan Muslim League and other politicians supporting the creation of the West Pakistan province, on the instigation of key leaders in the military and civil service. The President of the party was Dr Khan Sahib, Chief Minister of West Pakistan. The main instigator behind this development was Iskander Mirza, the then President of Pakistan. He was the vice president of this party. The Central Parliamentary Leader was Sir Feroz Khan Noon, Prime Minister of Pakistan (1957 - 1958).

== Party leaders ==
=== Punjab ===
Nawab Muzaffar Ali Khan Qizilbash, Fazal Ilahi Chaudhry (Gujrat District), Syed Amjad Ali (Lahore District), Sardar Abdul Hamid Khan Dasti (Muzaffargarh District), Col. Syed Abid Hussain (Jhang District), Sardar Amir Azam Khan, Syed Jamil Hussain Rizvi (Gujrat District), Makhdumzada Syed Hassan Mahmud (Rahim Yar Khan District), Mahr Muhammad Sadiq (Faisalabad District), Chaudhri Abdul Ghani Ghuman (Sialkot District), Begum Khudeja G. A. Khan (Faisalabad District), Rukan-ud-Daulah Shamsher Jang Ali-Haj Nawab Sajjad Ali Khan (Gujranwala District).

=== Sindh ===
Kazi Fazllullah Ubedullah (Larkana District), Pirzada Abdus Sattar (Sukkur District), Mirza Mumtaz Hassan Qizilbash (Khairpur Mirs), Haji Mir Ali Ahmed Khan Talpur (Hyderabad District), Haji Najmuddin Laghari sirewal (badin District) and Syed Khair Shah Imam Ali Shah (Nawabshah District).

=== North-West Frontier Province ===
Dr. Khan Sahib, Sardar Abdur Rashid Khan, Khan Jalaluddin Khan Jalal Baba, Khan Nur Muhammad Khan and Khan Sakhi Jan Khan (Bannu District)

=== Balochistan ===
Nawab Akbar Khan Bugti (Dera Bugti), Jam Mir Ghulam Qadir Khan (Lasbela District) Sardar Hafeez and Sardar Waleed Umar Rind (Turbat)

== Ideology ==
The party was made up of many civil servants who favored democratic and new forms of government (including Republicanism). Civil servants advocated for a stronger central government in the West Pakistan province. Many of the Republican Party’s Military and Civil aligned factions opposed the Islamic right-wing ideology and advocated for Secular forms of government, but at the same time, being a offshoot party of the Conservative Muslim League, the party leaned to the Centre-right.

=== One Unit Scheme ===
The Republican Party's whole founding ideology differed from the ideology of the Muslim League. The Republican Party wished to establish an independent West Pakistan province. The hope was for a better sense of unity throughout the country, just as the way East Pakistan was one province. The One Unit Scheme would unite the provinces of Balochistan, Punjab, Khyber Pakhtunkhwa, Sindh, the Federally Administered Tribal Areas into one province known as the West Pakistan province, the One Unit Scheme ideology of removing inequality between East and West Pakistan by promoting the One Unit program was founded by several statesmen mainly from the Republican Party, and under Mohammad Ali Bogra.

== State leaders ==
President of Pakistan
| Name | Term in office |
| Iskander Mirza | 1956–1958 |

Prime Minister of Pakistan
| Name | Term in office |
| Feroz Khan Noon | 1957–1958 |

Governor of West Pakistan
| Name | Term in office |
| Mushtaq Ahmed Gurmani | 1956–1957 |

Chief Minister of West Pakistan
| Name | Term in office |
| Khan Abdul Jabbar Khan | 1956–1957 |
| Abdur Rashid Khan | 1957–1958 |
| Muzaffar Ali Khan Qizilbash | 1958 |
