= West Punjab =

Former province of Pakistan from 1947 to 1955

Coordinates: 31°00′N 72°00′E

West Punjab مغربی پنجاب (Urdu) لہندا پنجاب (Punjabi)
- Former Province of Pakistan
- 1947–1955
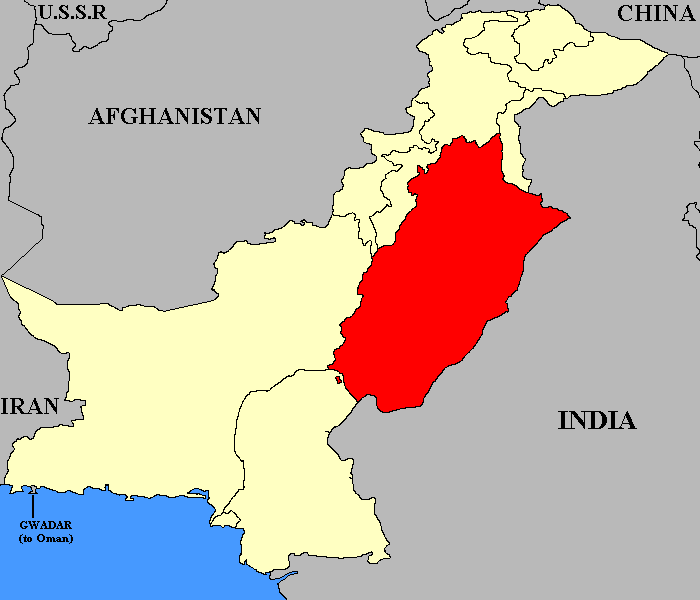
- Province of West Punjab in Pakistan
- Capital: Lahore
- Demonym: Punjabi
- Area
  - 1947–1955: 205,255 km^{2} (79,249 sq mi)
- Population
  - 1951: 20,651,140
- Government
  - Type: Self-governing province subject to the central government
- Governor
  - 1947–1949: Francis Mudie
  - 1949–1951: Abdur Rab Nishtar
  - 1951–1953: I. I. Chundrigar
  - 1953–1954: Mian Aminuddin
  - 1954: Habib Rahimtoola
  - 1954–1955: Mian Mushtaq Ahmed
- Chief Minister
  - 1947–1949: Iftikhar Hussain Khan
  - 1951–1953: Mumtaz Daultana
  - 1953–1955: Feroz Khan Noon
  - 1955: Abdul Hamid Khan
- Historical era: Cold War
  - Established: 14 August 1947
  - Disestablished: 14 October 1955
- Political subdivisions: Lahore Division; Sargodha Division; Multan Division; Rawalpindi Division; Bahawalpur state
Preceded by	Succeeded by
Punjab Province	West Pakistan
- Today part of: Pakistan: Punjab; Islamabad Capital Territory

West Punjab was a province in the Dominion of Pakistan from 1947 to 1955. It was established from the western-half of British Punjab, following the independence of Pakistan. The province covered an area of 205,255 km^{2} (79,249 sq mi), including much of the current Punjab province and the Islamabad Capital Territory, including the former Princely state of Bahawalpur, which was an autonomous region until 1955, though it remained subordinate to the province. Lahore, being the largest city and the cultural centre, served as the capital of the province. The province was composed of four divisions (Lahore, Sargodha, Multan and Rawalpindi) and was bordered by the state of Bahawalpur to the south-east, the province of Baluchistan to the south-west and Sind to the south, North-West Frontier Province to the north-west, and Azad Jammu and Kashmir to the north. It shared International border with Indian state of East Punjab to the east and Indian-administered Jammu & Kashmir to the north-east. It was dissolved and merged into West Pakistan upon creation of One Unit Scheme, in 1955.

== History ==
The creation of Pakistan in 1947 led to the division of the Punjab Province of British India into two new provinces. The largely Sikh and Hindu East Punjab became part of the new nation of India while the largely Muslim West Punjab became part of the new nation of the Dominion of Pakistan. The name of the province was shortened to Punjab in 1950. West Punjab was merged into the province of West Pakistan in 1955 under the One Unit policy announced by Prime Minister Chaudhary Muhammad Ali. When that province was dissolved, the area of the former province of West Punjab was combined with the former state of Bahawalpur to form a new Punjab Province.

Bahawalpur State was the only state of the Punjab States Agency, which was subordinate to the Punjab Province, to accede to Pakistan.

== Government ==
The offices of Governor of West Punjab and Chief Minister of West Punjab lasted from 15 August 1947, until 14 October 1955. The first Governor was Sir Francis Mudie with Iftikhar Hussain Khan as the first Chief Minister. Both offices were abolished in 1955, when the province of West Pakistan was created. The last Governor of West Punjab, Mushtaq Ahmad Gurmani, became the first Governor of West Pakistan.

Tenure	Governor of West Punjab
15 August 1947 – 2 August 1949	Sir Francis Mudie
2 August 1949 – 24 November 1951	Sardar Abdur Rab Nishtar
24 November 1951 – 2 May 1953	Ismail Ibrahim Chundrigar
2 May 1953 – 24 June 1954	Mian Aminuddin
26 September 1954 – 26 November 1954	Habib Ibrahim Rahmatullah
27 November 1954 – 14 October 1955	Mushtaq Ahmad Gurmani
14 October 1955	Province of West Punjab dissolved

Tenure	Chief Minister of West Punjab	Political Party
15 August 1947 – 25 January 1949	Iftikhar Hussain Khan	
25 January 1949 – 5 April 1952	Governor's Rule	
5 April 1952 – 3 April 1953	Mian Mumtaz Daultana	Pakistan Muslim League
3 April 1953 – 21 May 1955	Malik Firoz Khan Nun	Pakistan Muslim League
21 May 1955 – 14 October 1955	Abdul Hamid Khan Dasti	
14 October 1955	Province of West Punjab dissolved	

== Demographics ==
=== Population ===
Historical population
Year	Pop.	±% p.a.
1881	7,942,399	—
1891	8,895,342	+1.14%
1901	10,427,765	+1.60%
1911	11,104,585	+0.63%
1921	11,888,985	+0.68%
1931	14,040,798	+1.68%
1941	17,350,103	+2.14%
1951	20,651,140	+1.76%

=== Religion ===
==== 1901 census ====
Religions in West Punjab, Pakistan region (1901) (Note: 1901 figure taken from census data by combining the total population of all districts (Lahore, Sialkot, Gujranwala, Gujrat, Shahpur, Jhelum, Rawalpindi, Mianwali, Montgomery, Lyallpur (inscribed as the Chenab Colony on the 1901 census), Jhang, Multan, Muzaffargargh, Dera Ghazi Khan), one tehsil (Shakargarh – then part of Gurdaspur District), one princely state (Bahawalpur), and one tract (Biloch Trans–Frontier) in Punjab Province, British India that ultimately fell on the western side of the Radcliffe Line. See 1901 census data here: Immediately following the partition of India in 1947, these districts and tract would ultimately make up the subdivision of West Punjab, which also later included Bahawalpur. The state that makes up this region in the contemporary era is Punjab, Pakistan.)
1. Islam (76.2%)
2. Hinduism (18.6%)
3. Sikhism (4.64%)
4. Christianity (0.41%)
5. Jainism (0.05%)
6. Others (Note: Including Buddhism, Zoroastrianism, Judaism, Tribals, others, or not stated) (0.00%)

Religion in the Districts & Princely States of West Punjab, Pakistan region (1901)
District/ Princely State	Islam		Hinduism		Sikhism		Christianity		Jainism		Others		Total	
District/ Princely State	Pop.	%	Pop.	%	Pop.	%	Pop.	%	Pop.	%	Pop.	%	Pop.	%
Lahore District	717,519	61.74%	276,375	23.78%	159,701	13.74%	7,296	0.63%	1,047	0.09%	171	0.01%	1,162,109	100%
Sialkot District	716,953	66.15%	302,012	27.86%	50,982	4.7%	11,939	1.1%	2,008	0.19%	15	0%	1,083,909	100%
Rawalpindi District	803,283	86.32%	86,269	9.27%	32,234	3.46%	7,614	0.82%	1,068	0.11%	67	0.01%	930,535	100%
Lyallpur District	484,657	61.2%	210,459	26.58%	88,049	11.12%	8,672	1.1%	23	0%	1	0%	791,861	100%
Gujranwala District	531,908	70.28%	169,594	22.41%	51,607	6.82%	2,748	0.36%	932	0.12%	8	0%	756,797	100%
Gujrat District	655,838	87.38%	69,346	9.24%	24,893	3.32%	460	0.06%	11	0%	0	0%	750,548	100%
Bahawalpur State	598,139	82.97%	114,670	15.91%	7,985	1.11%	83	0.01%	0	0%	0	0%	720,877	100%
Multan District	570,254	80.25%	133,560	18.79%	4,662	0.66%	1,964	0.28%	134	0.02%	52	0.01%	710,626	100%
Jhelum District	526,725	88.67%	51,801	8.72%	15,070	2.54%	271	0.05%	151	0.03%	0	0%	594,018	100%
Shahpur District	442,921	84.49%	68,489	13.06%	12,756	2.43%	91	0.02%	2	0%	0	0%	524,259	100%
Dera Ghazi Khan District	412,012	87.45%	57,815	12.27%	1,027	0.22%	152	0.03%	143	0.03%	0	0%	471,149	100%
Montgomery District	334,474	72.15%	109,945	23.72%	19,092	4.12%	66	0.01%	8	0%	1	0%	463,586	100%
Mianwali District	371,674	87.54%	50,202	11.82%	2,633	0.62%	44	0.01%	35	0.01%	0	0%	424,588	100%
Muzaffargarh District	350,177	86.32%	52,221	12.87%	3,225	0.8%	33	0.01%	0	0%	0	0%	405,656	100%
Jhang District	295,481	78.03%	79,650	21.03%	3,526	0.93%	38	0.01%	0	0%	0	0%	378,695	100%
Shakargarh Tehsil (Note: Part of Gurdaspur District which was awarded to Pakistan as part of the Radcliffe Line.)	115,189	49.13%	111,819	47.69%	6,557	2.8%	900	0.38%	0	0%	0	0%	234,465	100%
Biloch Trans–Frontier Tract	23,951	99.44%	136	0.56%	0	0%	0	0%	0	0%	0	0%	24,087	100%
Total	7,951,155	76.25%	1,944,363	18.65%	483,999	4.64%	42,371	0.41%	5,562	0.05%	315	0.003%	10,427,765	100%
Territory comprises the contemporary province of Punjab, Pakistan and Islamabad Capital Territory. Note: 186 villages and 2 towns — Khemkaran and Patti — in Kasur Tehsil (Lahore District) fell on the eastern punjab (Indian) side of the Radcliffe Line, but their population numbers are still included here as detailed sub-tehsil religious data did not exist at the time. According to the 1941 census, Kasur Tehsil had a total of 322 villages and 3 towns, roughly half fell on the western punjab (Pakistani) side of the Radcliffe Line.

==== 1911 census ====
Religions in West Punjab, Pakistan region (1911) (Note: 1911 figure taken from census data by combining the total population of all districts (Lahore, Sialkot, Gujranwala, Gujrat, Shahpur, Jhelum, Rawalpindi, Attock, Mianwali, Montgomery, Lyallpur, Jhang, Multan, Muzaffargargh, Dera Ghazi Khan), one tehsil (Shakargarh – then part of Gurdaspur District), one princely state (Bahawalpur), and one tract (Biloch Trans–Frontier) in Punjab Province, British India that ultimately fell on the western side of the Radcliffe Line. See 1911 census data here: Immediately following the partition of India in 1947, these districts and tract would ultimately make up the subdivision of West Punjab, which also later included Bahawalpur. The state that makes up this region in the contemporary era is Punjab, Pakistan.)
1. Islam (76.5%)
2. Hinduism (14.8%)
3. Sikhism (7.33%)
4. Christianity (1.30%)
5. Jainism (0.05%)
6. Others (0.01%)

Religion in the Districts & Princely States of West Punjab, Pakistan region (1911)
District/ Princely State	Islam		Hinduism		Sikhism		Christianity		Jainism		Others		Total	
District/ Princely State	Pop.	%	Pop.	%	Pop.	%	Pop.	%	Pop.	%	Pop.	%	Pop.	%
Lahore District	626,271	60.44%	217,609	21%	169,008	16.31%	21,781	2.1%	1,139	0.11%	350	0.03%	1,036,158	100%
Sialkot District	604,801	61.74%	242,325	24.74%	81,761	8.35%	48,620	4.96%	2,029	0.21%	17	0%	979,553	100%
Gujranwala District	622,430	67.4%	176,075	19.07%	107,748	11.67%	16,215	1.76%	950	0.1%	1	0%	923,419	100%
Lyallpur District	524,288	61.13%	154,603	18.03%	146,670	17.1%	32,023	3.73%	125	0.01%	2	0%	857,711	100%
Multan District	665,488	81.67%	126,603	15.54%	19,881	2.44%	2,441	0.3%	394	0.05%	64	0.01%	814,871	100%
Bahawalpur State	654,247	83.81%	109,548	14.03%	16,630	2.13%	199	0.03%	15	0%	2	0%	780,641	100%
Gujrat District	650,893	87.29%	49,430	6.63%	44,693	5.99%	570	0.08%	48	0.01%	0	0%	745,634	100%
Shahpur District	572,565	83.3%	72,695	10.58%	33,456	4.87%	8,616	1.25%	5	0%	29	0%	687,366	100%
Muzaffargarh District	494,915	86.91%	68,158	11.97%	6,322	1.11%	60	0.01%	1	0%	5	0%	569,461	100%
Rawalpindi District	458,101	83.62%	48,449	8.84%	31,839	5.81%	8,320	1.52%	1,028	0.19%	90	0.02%	547,827	100%
Montgomery District	399,723	74.67%	66,803	12.48%	68,175	12.74%	581	0.11%	13	0%	4	0%	535,299	100%
Attock District	471,890	90.88%	19,741	3.8%	26,914	5.18%	707	0.14%	9	0%	12	0%	519,273	100%
Jhang District	422,468	81.95%	73,426	14.24%	19,427	3.77%	201	0.04%	4	0%	0	0%	515,526	100%
Jhelum District	452,260	88.41%	34,261	6.7%	24,436	4.78%	450	0.09%	163	0.03%	5	0%	511,575	100%
Dera Ghazi Khan District	442,234	88.47%	56,485	11.3%	1,042	0.21%	76	0.02%	23	0%	0	0%	499,860	100%
Mianwali District	299,971	87.87%	36,326	10.64%	4,881	1.43%	168	0.05%	31	0.01%	0	0%	341,377	100%
Shakargarh Tehsil	103,356	49.11%	93,052	44.22%	10,553	5.01%	3,486	1.66%	0	0%	0	0%	210,447	100%
Biloch Trans–Frontier Tract	28,413	99.39%	169	0.59%	5	0.02%	0	0%	0	0%	0	0%	28,587	100%
Total	8,494,314	76.49%	1,645,758	14.82%	813,441	7.33%	144,514	1.3%	5,977	0.05%	581	0.01%	11,104,585	100%
Territory comprises the contemporary province of Punjab, Pakistan and Islamabad Capital Territory. Note: 186 villages and 2 towns — Khemkaran and Patti — in Kasur Tehsil (Lahore District) fell on the eastern punjab(Indian) side of the Radcliffe Line, but their population numbers are still included here as detailed sub-tehsil religious data did not exist at the time. According to the 1941 census, Kasur Tehsil had a total of 322 villages and 3 towns, roughly half fell on the western punjab(Pakistani) side of the Radcliffe Line.

==== 1921 census ====
Religions in West Punjab, Pakistan region (1921) (Note: 1921 figure taken from census data by combining the total population of all districts (Lahore, Sialkot, Gujranwala, Sheikhupura, Gujrat, Shahpur, Jhelum, Rawalpindi, Attock, Mianwali, Montgomery, Lyallpur, Jhang, Multan, Muzaffargargh, Dera Ghazi Khan), one tehsil (Shakargarh – then part of Gurdaspur District), one princely state (Bahawalpur), and one tract (Biloch Trans–Frontier) in Punjab Province, British India that ultimately fell on the western side of the Radcliffe Line. See 1921 census data here: Immediately following the partition of India in 1947, these districts and tract would ultimately make up the subdivision of West Punjab, which also later included Bahawalpur. The state that makes up this region in the contemporary era is Punjab, Pakistan.)
1. Islam (75.5%)
2. Hinduism (15.1%)
3. Sikhism (7.26%)
4. Christianity (2.08%)
5. Jainism (0.05%)
6. Others (0.00%)

Religion in the Districts & Princely States of West Punjab, Pakistan region (1921)
District/ Princely State	Islam		Hinduism		Sikhism		Christianity		Jainism		Others		Total	
District/ Princely State	Pop.	%	Pop.	%	Pop.	%	Pop.	%	Pop.	%	Pop.	%	Pop.	%
Lahore District	647,640	57.25%	255,690	22.6%	179,975	15.91%	46,454	4.11%	1,209	0.11%	368	0.03%	1,131,336	100%
Lyallpur District	594,917	60.74%	181,488	18.53%	160,821	16.42%	42,004	4.29%	231	0.02%	2	0%	979,463	100%
Sialkot District	580,532	61.9%	217,912	23.24%	74,939	7.99%	62,266	6.64%	2,147	0.23%	27	0%	937,823	100%
Multan District	731,605	82.18%	134,013	15.05%	18,562	2.08%	6,006	0.67%	28	0%	50	0.01%	890,264	100%
Gujrat District	709,684	86.12%	62,529	7.59%	49,456	6%	2,373	0.29%	4	0%	0	0%	824,046	100%
Bahawalpur State	647,207	82.85%	114,621	14.67%	19,071	2.44%	283	0.04%	1	0%	8	0%	781,191	100%
Shahpur District	596,100	82.8%	82,182	11.42%	30,361	4.22%	11,270	1.57%	3	0%	2	0%	719,918	100%
Montgomery District	513,055	71.88%	94,791	13.28%	95,520	13.38%	10,408	1.46%	12	0%	0	0%	713,786	100%
Gujranwala District	443,147	71.06%	101,566	16.29%	50,802	8.15%	27,308	4.38%	754	0.12%	4	0%	623,581	100%
Jhang District	475,388	83.32%	85,339	14.96%	9,376	1.64%	449	0.08%	7	0%	0	0%	570,559	100%
Rawalpindi District	470,038	82.58%	57,185	10.05%	31,718	5.57%	9,286	1.63%	954	0.17%	43	0.01%	569,224	100%
Muzaffargarh District	493,369	86.79%	69,878	12.29%	4,869	0.86%	356	0.06%	6	0%	0	0%	568,478	100%
Sheikhupura District	330,880	63.25%	85,781	16.4%	82,965	15.86%	23,431	4.48%	78	0.01%	0	0%	523,135	100%
Attock District	465,694	90.91%	26,184	5.11%	19,809	3.87%	557	0.11%	5	0%	0	0%	512,249	100%
Jhelum District	422,979	88.66%	34,837	7.3%	18,626	3.9%	430	0.09%	195	0.04%	1	0%	477,068	100%
Dera Ghazi Khan District	411,431	87.72%	56,346	12.01%	932	0.2%	47	0.01%	296	0.06%	0	0%	469,052	100%
Mianwali District	308,876	86.23%	45,974	12.83%	2,986	0.83%	369	0.1%	0	0%	0	0%	358,205	100%
Shakargarh Tehsil	106,168	49.88%	90,645	42.59%	12,303	5.78%	3,733	1.75%	0	0%	0	0%	212,849	100%
Biloch Trans–Frontier Tract	26,578	99.33%	180	0.67%	0	0%	0	0%	0	0%	0	0%	26,758	100%
Total	8,975,288	75.49%	1,797,141	15.12%	863,091	7.26%	247,030	2.08%	5,930	0.05%	505	0.004%	11,888,985	100%
Territory comprises the contemporary province of Punjab, Pakistan and Islamabad Capital Territory. Note: 186 villages and 2 towns — Khemkaran and Patti — in Kasur Tehsil (Lahore District) fell on the eastern punjab (Indian) side of the Radcliffe Line, but their population numbers are still included here as detailed sub-tehsil religious data did not exist at the time. According to the 1941 census, Kasur Tehsil had a total of 322 villages and 3 towns, roughly half fell on the western punjab (Pakistani) side of the Radcliffe Line.

==== 1931 census ====
Religions in West Punjab, Pakistan region (1931) (Note: 1931 figure taken from census data by combining the total population of all districts (Lahore, Sialkot, Gujranwala, Sheikhupura, Gujrat, Shahpur, Jhelum, Rawalpindi, Attock, Mianwali, Montgomery, Lyallpur, Jhang, Multan, Muzaffargargh, Dera Ghazi Khan), one tehsil (Shakargarh – then part of Gurdaspur District), one princely state (Bahawalpur), and one tract (Biloch Trans–Frontier) in Punjab Province, British India that ultimately fell on the western side of the Radcliffe Line. See 1931 census data here: Immediately following the partition of India in 1947, these districts and tract would ultimately make up the subdivision of West Punjab, which also later included Bahawalpur. The state that makes up this region in the contemporary era is Punjab, Pakistan.)
1. Islam (75.3%)
2. Hinduism (Note: Including Ad-Dharmis) (13.9%)
3. Sikhism (8.41%)
4. Christianity (2.31%)
5. Jainism (0.05%)
6. Others (0.00%)

Religion in the Districts & Princely States of West Punjab, Pakistan region (1931)
District/ Princely State	Islam		Hinduism		Sikhism		Christianity		Jainism		Others		Total	
District/ Princely State	Pop.	%	Pop.	%	Pop.	%	Pop.	%	Pop.	%	Pop.	%	Pop.	%
Lahore District	815,820	59.18%	259,725	18.84%	244,304	17.72%	57,097	4.14%	1,450	0.11%	174	0.01%	1,378,570	100%
Multan District	942,937	80.26%	182,029	15.49%	39,453	3.36%	9,924	0.84%	440	0.04%	117	0.01%	1,174,900	100%
Lyallpur District	720,996	62.62%	173,344	15.06%	211,391	18.36%	45,518	3.95%	95	0.01%	7	0%	1,151,351	100%
Montgomery District	697,542	69.77%	136,783	13.68%	148,155	14.82%	17,245	1.72%	38	0%	9	0%	999,772	100%
Bahawalpur State	799,176	81.17%	149,454	15.18%	34,896	3.54%	1,054	0.11%	12	0%	20	0%	984,612	100%
Sialkot District	609,633	62.23%	206,421	21.07%	94,955	9.69%	66,365	6.77%	2,236	0.23%	7	0%	979,617	100%
Gujrat District	786,750	85.29%	73,356	7.95%	59,188	6.42%	3,097	0.34%	32	0%	4	0%	922,427	100%
Shahpur District	679,546	82.72%	90,561	11.02%	40,074	4.88%	11,294	1.37%	14	0%	1	0%	821,490	100%
Gujranwala District	521,343	70.82%	92,764	12.6%	71,595	9.73%	49,364	6.71%	1,071	0.15%	1	0%	736,138	100%
Sheikhupura District	445,996	64.01%	81,887	11.75%	119,477	17.15%	49,266	7.07%	100	0.01%	6	0%	696,732	100%
Jhang District	552,853	83.16%	102,990	15.49%	8,476	1.27%	494	0.07%	0	0%	20	0%	664,833	100%
Rawalpindi District	524,965	82.76%	59,485	9.38%	41,265	6.51%	7,486	1.18%	1,077	0.17%	79	0.01%	634,357	100%
Muzaffargarh District	513,265	86.79%	72,577	12.27%	5,287	0.89%	246	0.04%	0	0%	0	0%	591,375	100%
Attock District	531,793	91.07%	31,932	5.47%	19,522	3.34%	710	0.12%	2	0%	1	0%	583,960	100%
Jhelum District	482,097	89.1%	36,068	6.67%	22,030	4.07%	672	0.12%	209	0.04%	0	0%	541,076	100%
Dera Ghazi Khan District	432,911	88.16%	57,217	11.65%	760	0.15%	31	0.01%	125	0.03%	0	0%	491,044	100%
Mianwali District	357,109	86.77%	49,794	12.1%	4,231	1.03%	380	0.09%	20	0%	5	0%	411,539	100%
Shakargarh Tehsil	125,828	50.87%	101,318	40.96%	15,730	6.36%	4,487	1.81%	0	0%	0	0%	247,363	100%
Biloch Trans–Frontier Tract	29,469	99.42%	173	0.58%	0	0%	0	0%	0	0%	0	0%	29,642	100%
Total	10,570,029	75.28%	1,957,878	13.94%	1,180,789	8.41%	324,730	2.31%	6,921	0.05%	451	0.003%	14,040,798	100%
Territory comprises the contemporary province of Punjab, Pakistan and Islamabad Capital Territory. Note: 186 villages and 2 towns — Khemkaran and Patti — in Kasur Tehsil (Lahore District) fell on the eastern punjab (Indian) side of the Radcliffe Line, but their population numbers are still included here as detailed sub-tehsil religious data did not exist at the time. According to the 1941 census, Kasur Tehsil had a total of 322 villages and 3 towns, roughly half fell on the western punjab (Pakistani) side of the Radcliffe Line.

==== 1941 census ====
Religions in West Punjab, Pakistan region (1941) (Note: 1941 figure taken from census data by combining the total population of all districts (Lahore, Sialkot, Gujranwala, Sheikhupura, Gujrat, Shahpur, Jhelum, Rawalpindi, Attock, Mianwali, Montgomery, Lyallpur, Jhang, Multan, Muzaffargargh, Dera Ghazi Khan), one tehsil (Shakargarh – then part of Gurdaspur District), one princely state (Bahawalpur), and one tract (Biloch Trans–Frontier) in Punjab Province, British India that ultimately fell on the western side of the Radcliffe Line. See 1941 census data here: Immediately following the partition of India in 1947, these districts and tract would ultimately make up the subdivision of West Punjab, which also later included Bahawalpur. The state that makes up this region in the contemporary era is Punjab, Pakistan.)
1. Islam (75.1%)
2. Hinduism (13.7%)
3. Sikhism (8.82%)
4. Christianity (2.28%)
5. Jainism (0.05%)
6. Others (0.11%)

At Independence there was a Muslim majority in West Punjab with a significant Hindu and Sikh minority. Nearly all of these minorities left West Punjab for India, to be replaced by large numbers of Muslims fleeing from the opposite direction.

Religion in the Districts & Princely States of West Punjab, Pakistan region (1941)
District/ Princely State	Islam		Hinduism		Sikhism		Christianity		Jainism		Others		Total	
District/ Princely State	Pop.	%	Pop.	%	Pop.	%	Pop.	%	Pop.	%	Pop.	%	Pop.	%
Lahore District	1,027,772	60.62%	284,689	16.79%	310,646	18.32%	70,147	4.14%	1,951	0.12%	170	0.01%	1,695,375	100%
Multan District	1,157,911	78.01%	249,872	16.83%	61,628	4.15%	14,290	0.96%	552	0.04%	80	0.01%	1,484,333	100%
Lyallpur District	877,518	62.85%	204,059	14.61%	262,737	18.82%	51,948	3.72%	35	0%	8	0%	1,396,305	100%
Bahawalpur State	1,098,814	81.93%	174,408	13%	46,945	3.5%	3,048	0.23%	351	0.03%	17,643	1.32%	1,341,209	100%
Montgomery District	918,564	69.11%	210,966	15.87%	175,064	13.17%	24,432	1.84%	49	0%	28	0%	1,329,103	100%
Sialkot District	739,218	62.09%	231,319	19.43%	139,409	11.71%	75,831	6.37%	3,250	0.27%	1,470	0.12%	1,190,497	100%
Gujrat District	945,609	85.58%	84,643	7.66%	70,233	6.36%	4,449	0.4%	10	0%	8	0%	1,104,952	100%
Shahpur District	835,918	83.68%	102,172	10.23%	48,046	4.81%	12,770	1.28%	13	0%	2	0%	998,921	100%
Gujranwala District	642,706	70.45%	108,115	11.85%	99,139	10.87%	60,829	6.67%	1,445	0.16%	0	0%	912,234	100%
Sheikhupura District	542,344	63.62%	89,182	10.46%	160,706	18.85%	60,054	7.04%	221	0.03%	1	0%	852,508	100%
Jhang District	678,736	82.61%	129,889	15.81%	12,238	1.49%	763	0.09%	5	0%	0	0%	821,631	100%
Rawalpindi District	628,193	80%	82,478	10.5%	64,127	8.17%	9,014	1.15%	1,337	0.17%	82	0.01%	785,231	100%
Muzaffargarh District	616,074	86.42%	90,643	12.72%	5,882	0.83%	227	0.03%	0	0%	23	0%	712,849	100%
Attock District	611,128	90.42%	43,209	6.39%	20,120	2.98%	1,392	0.21%	13	0%	13	0%	675,875	100%
Jhelum District	563,033	89.42%	40,888	6.49%	24,680	3.92%	893	0.14%	159	0.03%	5	0%	629,658	100%
Dera Ghazi Khan District	512,678	88.19%	67,407	11.59%	1,072	0.18%	87	0.01%	106	0.02%	0	0%	581,350	100%
Mianwali District	436,260	86.16%	62,814	12.41%	6,865	1.36%	358	0.07%	23	0%	1	0%	506,321	100%
Shakargarh Tehsil	149,600	51.32%	116,553	39.98%	20,573	7.06%	4,779	1.64%	0	0%	0	0%	291,505	100%
Biloch Trans–Frontier Tract	40,084	99.6%	160	0.4%	2	0%	0	0%	0	0%	0	0%	40,246	100%
Total	13,022,160	75.06%	2,373,466	13.68%	1,530,112	8.82%	395,311	2.28%	9,520	0.05%	19,534	0.11%	17,350,103	100%
Territory comprises the contemporary province of Punjab, Pakistan and Islamabad Capital Territory. Note: 186 villages and 2 towns — Khemkaran and Patti — in Kasur Tehsil (Lahore District) fell on the eastern punjab (Indian) side of the Radcliffe Line, but their population numbers are still included here as detailed sub-tehsil religious data did not exist at the time. According to the 1941 census, Kasur Tehsil had a total of 322 villages and 3 towns, roughly half fell on the western punjab (Pakistani) side of the Radcliffe Line.

==== 1951 census ====
Religions in West Punjab, Pakistan (1951)
1. Islam (97.8%)
2. Christianity (1.94%)
3. Hinduism (0.16%)
4. Others (0.07%)

Religion in the Districts of West Punjab, Pakistan (1951)
District	Islam		Christianity		Hinduism		Zoroastrianism		Buddhism		Others		Total	
District	Pop.	%	Pop.	%	Pop.	%	Pop.	%	Pop.	%	Pop.	%	Pop.	%
Lyallpur District	2,087,905	97%	63,608	2.96%	888	0.04%	0	0%	0	0%	0	0%	2,152,401	100%
Multan District	2,092,624	99.31%	14,453	0.69%	151	0.01%	13	0%	0	0%	0	0%	2,107,241	100%
Lahore District	1,794,331	94.68%	98,107	5.18%	2,433	0.13%	173	0.01%	8	0%	9	0%	1,895,061	100%
Montgomery District	1,788,930	98.52%	26,864	1.48%	90	0%	4	0%	0	0%	0	0%	1,815,888	100%
Sialkot District	1,382,922	93.81%	76,873	5.21%	14,397	0.98%	4	0%	0	0%	0	0%	1,474,196	100%
Shahpur District	1,152,345	99.22%	8,984	0.77%	58	0%	0	0%	0	0%	0	0%	1,161,387	100%
Gujrat District	1,156,251	99.87%	1,392	0.12%	99	0.01%	0	0%	0	0%	0	0%	1,157,742	100%
Gujranwala District	987,292	94.3%	58,419	5.58%	1,211	0.12%	0	0%	0	0%	11	0%	1,046,933	100%
Bahawalpur District	967,085	99.67%	1,301	0.13%	1,916	0.2%	0	0%	0	0%	0	0%	970,302	100%
Sheikhupura District	877,190	95.03%	45,417	4.92%	461	0.05%	0	0%	0	0%	13	0%	923,081	100%
Jhang District	874,588	99.89%	874	0.1%	69	0.01%	0	0%	0	0%	0	0%	875,531	100%
Rawalpindi District	871,736	99.63%	3,119	0.36%	114	0.01%	1	0%	1	0%	0	0%	874,971	100%
Rahim Yar Khan District	840,671	98.65%	773	0.09%	10,755	1.26%	0	0%	0	0%	0	0%	852,199	100%
Muzaffargarh District	751,206	99.99%	19	0%	24	0%	0	0%	0	0%	0	0%	751,249	100%
Campbellpur District	721,666	99.88%	568	0.08%	308	0.04%	0	0%	0	0%	0	0%	722,542	100%
Jhelum District	677,693	99.82%	1,133	0.17%	72	0.01%	0	0%	0	0%	2	0%	678,900	100%
Dera Ghazi Khan District	627,458	99.99%	65	0.01%	6	0%	0	0%	0	0%	0	0%	627,529	100%
Mianwali District	548,901	99.88%	648	0.12%	0	0%	0	0%	0	0%	0	0%	549,549	100%
Total responses	20,200,794	97.89%	402,617	1.95%	33,052	0.16%	195	0%	9	0%	35	0%	20,636,702	99.93%
Total population	—N/a	—N/a	—N/a	—N/a	—N/a	—N/a	—N/a	—N/a	—N/a	—N/a	14,438	0.07%	20,651,140	100%
Territory comprises the contemporary province of Punjab, Pakistan and Islamabad Capital Territory.

=== Language ===
The official language of West Punjab was Urdu but most of the population spoke Punjabi. The linguist George Abraham Grierson in his multi volume Linguistic Survey of India (1904–1928) considered the various dialects up to then called "Western Punjabi", spoken in North, West, and South of Lahore in what is now Pakistani Punjab, as constituting instead a distinct language from Punjabi. (The local dialect of Lahore is the Majhi dialect of Punjabi, which has long been the basis of standard literary Punjabi.) Grierson proposed to name this putative language "Lahnda", and he dubbed as "Southern Lahnda" the coherent dialect cluster now known as Saraiki spoken in Multan Dera Ghazi Khan and Bahawalpur division and "North Lahnda" now known as Potwari spoken in Rawalpindi division and "Western Lahnda" now known as Hindko spoken in the regions bordering Khyber-Pakhtunkhwa.

== Contemporary usage ==
The term is often used to refer to the Pakistani Punjab .

== See also ==
- History of Punjab
- Punjab region
- Punjab (Pakistan)
- Punjab (India)
- Haryana
- Bahawalpur State
