= Legal Framework Order, 1970 =

Presidential decree issued by Pakistani President Yahya Khan

- Long title: Legal Framework Order, 1970
- Territorial extent: Pakistan: West Pakistan; East Pakistan
- Commenced: 30 March, 1970

Legislative history
- Bill title: Legal Framework Order
- Introduced by: Yahya Khan

Repeals
- Bangladesh 11 January, 1972; Pakistan 12 April, 1973

Summary
- To abolish the province of West Pakistan; To give electoral equality to East Pakistan
- Status: Repealed

The Legal Framework Order, 1970 (LFO) was a presidential decree issued by President of Pakistan Gen. Agha Muhammad Yahya Khan that laid down the political principles and laws governing the 1970 general election, which was the first direct election in the history of Pakistan. The LFO also dissolved the "One Unit" of West Pakistan, re-establishing the four provinces of Punjab, Sindh, Balochistan and the North-West Frontier Province (now Khyber Pakhtunkhwa). Pakistan would be a democratic country and the complete name of the country would be the Islamic Republic of Pakistan.

== Foundation and proposals ==
Gen. Yahya Khan had taken over from his predecessor President Ayub Khan with the purpose of restoring law and order in Pakistan that had deteriorated in the final days of Ayub's regime. Yahya promised to transition the country to democracy and promised to hold direct elections for that purpose. However, Gen. Yahya also had to decide on how the two wings of the country, East Pakistan and West Pakistan would be represented. Although geographically smaller and separated from West Pakistan by the whole width of India, East Pakistan (erstwhile East Bengal) consisted of more than half the national population and was predominantly inhabited by Bengali people. Allegations of ethnic discrimination and lack of representation had caused turmoil and conflict between the two wings of Pakistan. The Awami League, the largest political party in East Pakistan, espoused Bengali nationalism and sought greater autonomy for the province, which most West Pakistanis saw as secessionist.

Yahya Khan held talks with East Pakistan's Governor, Vice-Admiral Ahsan, and concluded that Sheikh Mujib would soften his demands after the election. Yahya instituted the Legal Framework Order (LFO) on March 30, 1970, with the aim to secure the future constitution.

== Provisions ==
The LFO called for direct elections for a unicameral legislature, the National Assembly of Pakistan. The LFO decreed that the assembly would be composed of 313 seats. Departing from the precedent of the 1956 Constitution of Pakistan, which stipulated for parity between the two wings, the LFO called for proportional representation, giving the more populous East Pakistan 169 seats in turn for West Pakistan's 144. The LFO stipulated that the National Assembly would have to create a new constitution for the state of Pakistan within 120 days of being convened, but reserved the right of approving the Constitution to the President and left the rules of the process in the hands of the new assembly to come. New elections would be called if the Assembly failed to come to an agreement in 120 days - all formulations and agreements proposed by political parties would require "authentication" by the president. The LFO also dissolved the "One Unit scheme", which had combined the four provinces of the western wing to constitute the political unit of West Pakistan.

The LFO also stipulated that the future Constitution was to include five principles.

1. The state's Islamic ideology and reserving the role of the Head of State for Muslims exclusively.
2. Free and regular elections, both provincial and federal, based on provincial populations and universal suffrage.
3. Judicial independence and human rights for the citizenry.
4. Assurance of maximum autonomy for the provinces while protecting the country's territorial sovereignty and providing sufficient powers to the Federal Government for functioning both internally and externally.
5. Providing national participation to all citizens with the removal of all regional and provincial disparities.

== Outcome ==
The LFO met a long-standing demand of Bengalis by accepting proportional representation, to the chagrin of many West Pakistanis who resisted the notion of an East Pakistani-led government. Many East Pakistanis criticised the LFO's reservation for the President the power to authenticate the Constitution. Yahya Khan assured Bengalis that this was only a procedural formality and necessary for the democratisation of the country. Yahya Khan ignored reports from the intelligence agencies about the increase in Indian influence in East Pakistan and that Mujib intended to tear up the LFO after the elections.

Contrary to Yahya Khan's opinion that the Awami League would not win the elections in the East wing, the Awami League won all but two seats from East Pakistan, gaining a majority in the National Assembly and thus not needing the support of any West Pakistani political party. As the LFO had not laid down any rules for the process of writing a constitution, an Awami League-controlled government would oversee the passage of a new constitution with a simple majority. The Pakistan Peoples Party of Zulfiqar Ali Bhutto, which had emerged as the largest political party in West Pakistan, declared it would boycott the new legislature, which severely aggravated tensions. After the failure of talks, Gen. Yahya postponed the convening of the legislature, a decision that provoked outright rebellion in East Pakistan and consequently led to the Bangladesh Liberation War in 1971.
