= Akhter Husain =

Pakistani politician (1902–1983)

Akhter Husain HPk, OBE
- اختر حسین
- Husain in 1960

7th Governor of West Pakistan
- In office September 1957 – 12 April 1960
- President: Iskander Mirza; Muhammad Ayub Khan
- Preceded by: Mushtaq Ahmed Gurmani
- Succeeded by: Amir Mohammad Khan

Personal details
- Born: 1 August 1902 Burhanpur, Central Provinces, British India (Now India)
- Died: 15 July 1983 (aged 81) Pakistan

Akhter Husain (Urdu: اختر حسین), HPk, OBE, (1 August 1902 – 15 July 1983) was a senior statesman and civil servant of Pakistan. He was appointed Governor of West Pakistan in September 1957 succeeding Mushtaq Ahmed Gurmani and then continued in this office during the regime of General Muhammad Ayub Khan until April 1960.

== Early life ==
Akhter Husain was born on 1 August 1902 at Burhanpur (Central Province, British India) and received his early education from Hakimia High School, Burhanpur before proceeding to MAO College at Aligarh (which later became Aligarh Muslim University), graduating later from Allahabad University. He was selected for the Indian Civil Service in 1924 and completed his education and training at St. John's College, Cambridge, England. Upon return from England, he was posted to serve in the province of Punjab in 1926. He served in various administrative positions in different districts of the province, before being appointed as Under Secretary in the Government of India in 1930. He returned to Provincial administration in 1936. Akhter Husain received a British government award of Order of the British Empire (OBE) on 1 January 1944 for his groundbreaking work of settlement in the district of Gurgaon in Punjab in 1943. He was appointed Chief Secretary in the undivided Punjab in 1946, a position he occupied during the partition of British India.

== Pakistan Government Service ==
He continued to serve as the Chief Secretary of West Punjab in the newly formed Dominion of Pakistan in 1947.

== Governor ==
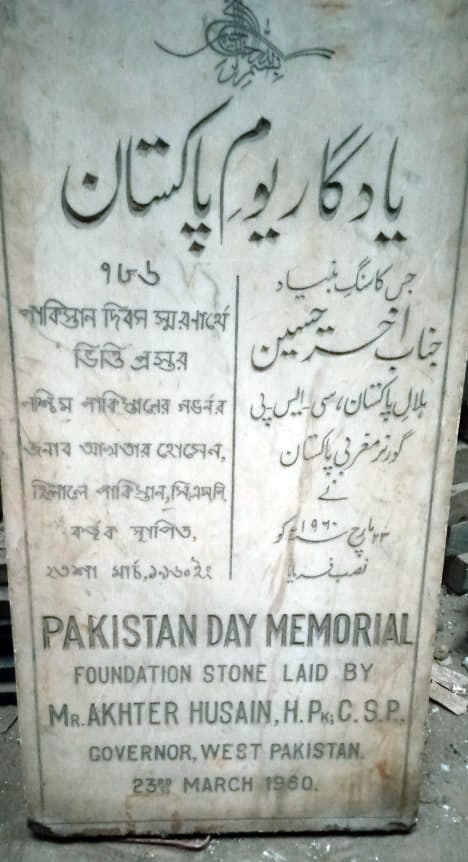
Original Foundation Stone Of Minar-e-Pakistan

Akhter Husain was appointed Governor on 28 August 1957 and remained in this position following the imposition of Martial law in October 1958. In the same year he was appointed Chairman of the Land Reforms Commission and provincial administration committee. In 1958, he was awarded the highest civil award of Hilal-i-Pakistan. He was responsible for raising money for the construction of the Pakistan Day Memorial Monument (now known as Minar-e-Pakistan) and laid its foundation stone in the then Minto Park Lahore on 23 March 1960.

== Later years ==
In 1960 after his governorship, he was appointed as minister in the Presidential cabinet successively holding the portfolios of Information and Broadcasting and then Education and Kashmir Affairs. In order to hold these quasi-political positions, he retired from the Civil Service. He was also the recipient of the honorary degree of Doctor of Law from the University of the Punjab. He was subsequently appointed Chief Election Commissioner of Pakistan and served in that position between 1962 and 1964. He also held the office of President of Anjuman-i Taraqqi-i Urdu (The organisation for the promotion and development of the Urdu language) from 1962 to 1983 and was Chairman of Pakistan Burmah Shell from 1968 until his death in 1983.

Political offices
Preceded by Mushtaq Ahmed Gurmani	Governor of West Pakistan; 1957 – 1960	Succeeded by Amir Mohammad Khan; Nawab of Kalabagh
