= Shahtaj Qizilbash =

Pakistani social activist (1940–2012)

- Occupation: Women's rights activist
- Organization(s): Women's Action Forum; Human Rights Commission of Pakistan; Joint Action Committee
- Known for: Founding member of the Women's Action Forum

Shahtaj Qizilbash (born 1934) was a Pakistani women's rights activist and human rights campaigner. She was known as a founding member of the Women's Action Forum (WAF) and for her later association with the Human Rights Commission of Pakistan (HRCP) and the Joint Action Committee.

== Early life and education ==
Qizilbash was born in 1934 to the ruling family of the princely state of Khambat, Arjun District, Gujarat, India. Her father was a member of the Nawabganj family of the princely state of Oudh and served as a major in the British Indian Army. Her mother was the sister of the 8th Nawab of Cambay. She received her early education at the Convent of Jesus and Mary, Lahore, and spent part of her early life in England. She spent a lot of time with her uncle Muzaffar Ali Khan Qizilbash, who was Pakistan's ambassador to France and later Finance Minister of Pakistan.

== Career ==
After returning to Pakistan in 1983, Qizilbash became active in campaigns against the discriminatory laws introduced during the rule of General Muhammad Zia-ul-Haq. She was among the founding members of the Women's Action Forum. She later joined the legal aid work associated with Asma Jahangir and Hina Jilani, where she helped develop paralegal training for women.

By 2006, Qizilbash was serving as convener of the Joint Action Committee for Peoples Rights. In that role, she publicly opposed the military operation in Balochistan and urged wider civil society participation in protests against rights violations. She also took part in civic and environmental protests in Lahore, including demonstrations against the felling of trees along Canal Bank Road.

Qizilbash remained active in WAF campaigns. In 2006, she was among the WAF leaders who rejected government-backed amendments to the Hudood Ordinances, insisting on repeal of the laws instead. During the 2007 Pakistani state of emergency, Qizilbash was among the human rights defenders detained in Lahore. In 2008, she was a Joint Action Committee representative during the Lawyers' Movement and also appeared alongside other WAF leaders at the release of a report on the 12 May 2007 Karachi violence.

== See also ==
- Qizilbash
- Nawab Muzaffar Ali Qizilbash
- Women's Action Forum
