= Sardar Bahadur Khan =

Pakistani politician

5th Leader of the Opposition
- In office 8 June 1962 – 21 August 1964
- Preceded by: I.I. Chundrigar
- Succeeded by: Nurul Amin

3rd Chief Minister of the North-West Frontier Province
- In office 19 July 1955 – 14 October 1955
- Preceded by: Sardar Abdur Rashid Khan
- Succeeded by: Mufti Mahmud (1972)

Chief Commissioner of Baluchistan
- In office 8 November 1954 – 19 July 1955
- Preceded by: Qurban Ali Khan
- Succeeded by: R.A.F. Hyride

2nd Minister of Communications
- In office 10 September 1949 – 24 October 1954
- Prime Minister: Liaquat Ali Khan; Khwaja Nizamuddin; Mohammad Ali Bogra
- Preceded by: Abdur Rab Nishtar
- Succeeded by: Khan Abdul Jabbar Khan

Minister of State for Foreign Affairs and Commonwealth Relations
- In office 17 February 1949 – 10 September 1949
- Prime Minister: Liaquat Ali Khan

Member of the National Assembly of Pakistan
- In office 8 June 1962 – 7 June 1965
- Constituency: NW-12 (Hazara- I)

Member of the Constituent Assembly of Pakistan
- In office 10 August 1947 – 24 October 1954
- Constituency: Hazara District

Personal details
- Born: 8 July 1908 Rehana village, Haripur District, North-West Frontier Province British India
- Died: 31 December 1975 (aged 67) Abbottabad, North-West Frontier Province, Pakistan
- Education: Aligarh Muslim University (LLB)
- Occupation: Politician

Sardar Bahadur Khan (Urdu: سردار بہادر خان; 8 July 1908 – 31 December 1975) was a Pakistani politician. He was the 9th Chief Minister of the Khyber-Pakhtunkhwa (then called Northwest Frontier Province).

== Personal life ==
He was the son of Risaldar Major Mir Dad Khan and the brother of former President of Pakistan Ayub Khan. He was born in the village of Rehana which is located in the Haripur District of the Khyber Pakhtunkhwa province. He belonged to a Hindko-speaking Tarin family.

He received his LLB Degree from Aligarh Muslim University.

== Political career ==
A member of the Muslim League in the province, he was elected to the NWFP Legislative Assembly from the Haripur Central constituency in a by-election in the winter of 1939. He became Speaker of the Assembly in 1942.

He was re-elected in the 1946 election. Khan later served as Minister of State for Foreign Affairs, Commonwealth Relations and Communications in the government of Prime Minister Liaquat Ali Khan (Muslim League) from 17 February – 10 September 1949 when he was promoted to full Cabinet Minister.

He served as Minister for Communications in the cabinets of multiple Prime Ministers: Liaquat Ali Khan from 10 September 1949 – 19 October 1951, Khawaja Nazimuddin from 24 October 1951 – 17 April 1953 and Muhammad Ali Bogra from 17 April 1953 – 24 October 1954. He held the additional portfolio of Health and Works from 10 September 1949 – 20 September 1949.

Bahadur Khan served as Chief Commissioner of Baluchistan from 8 November 1954 – 19 July 1955.

After the 1962 elections, he became Leader of the Opposition in the National Assembly of Pakistan during the government of President Field Marshal Muhammad Ayub Khan.

The Sardar Bahadur Khan Women University in Quetta is named in his memory and is the only all-female university in Balochistan.

Political offices
| Preceded by Sardar Abdur Rashid Khan | Chief Minister of North-West Frontier Province; 1955 | Succeeded by Mufti Mahmud |
