= West Pakistan =

Former provincial wing of Pakistan (1955–1970)

Coordinates: 30°N 70°E

West Pakistan পশ্চিম পাকিস্তান (Bengali) مغربى پاکستان (Urdu)
- 1955–1970
- Seal
- Anthem: Qaumi Taranah
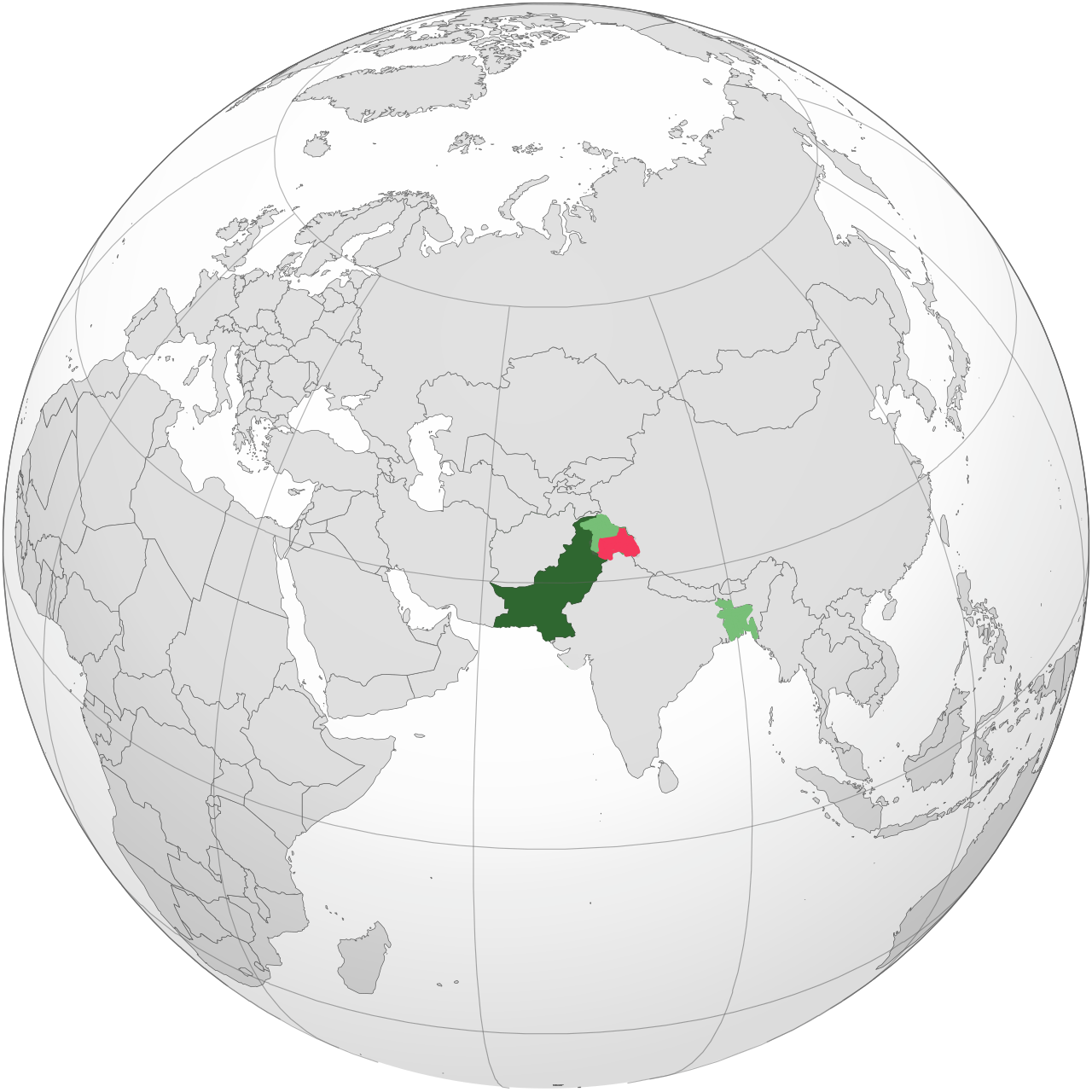
- Location of West Pakistan (dark green) (Note: Islamabad was separated from West Pakistan in 1967 to form Islamabad Capital Territory), the rest of Pakistan (light green) (Note: The territories of Northern Areas and Azad Jammu and Kashmir were administered directly by the federal government and hence were not made a formal part of West Pakistan, despite geographically being in the western half of Pakistan until 1971.) and territories claimed by the federal government (pink) (Note: post-2 March 1963 border between China and Pakistan)
- Status: Administrative unit of Pakistan
- Capital: Lahore
- Largest city: Lahore (1955–1959); Karachi (1959–1970) (Note: Karachi was amalgamated into the province in 1959 upon the dissolution of the Federal Capital Territory — with Rawalpindi (in West Pakistan, not as a separate territory) becoming the temporary federal capital until 1967.)
- Official languages: Urdu; English
- Native languages: Punjabi; Pashto; Sindhi; Balochi; Brahui; Khowar; Kohistani
- Demonyms: Pakistani; West Pakistani
- Government: Self-governing wing subject to the federal government
- Chief Ministers
  - 1955–1957: Abdul Jabbar Khan
  - 1957–1958: Abdur Rashid Khan
  - 1958 (Note: March to October): Muzaffar Ali Qizilbash
- Governors
  - 1955–1957: Mushtaq Ahmed Gurmani
  - 1957–1960: Akhter Husain
  - 1960–1966: Amir Mohammad Khan
  - 1966–1969: Musa Khan
  - 1969 (Note: March to September): Yusuf Haroon
  - 1969–1970: Malik Nur Khan
  - 1970–1971: Attiqur Rahman (Note: As Martial Law Administrator)
- Legislature: Legislative Assembly
- Historical era: Cold War
  - Established: 14 October 1955
  - Dissolved: 1 July 1970

Area
  - Total: 796,096 km^{2} (307,374 sq mi)

Population
  - 1951 census: 33,740,000
- Currency: Pakistani rupee
- Time zone: UTC+05:00
Preceded by
| 1955: West Punjab |
| Sind Province |
| North-West Frontier Province |
| Baluchistan Province |
| Bahawalpur State |
| Khairpur State |
| Kalat State |
| Las Bela State |
| Kharan State |
| Makran State |
| 1958: Gwadar (Omani Territory) |
| 1961: Federal Capital Territory |
| 1969: Amb State |
| Swat State |
| Dir State |
| Chitral State |
Succeeded by
| 1967: Islamabad Capital Territory |
| 1970: Punjab |
| Sindh |
| North-West Frontier Province |
| Balochistan |
- Today part of: Pakistan

West Pakistan was the western province of Pakistan between 1955 and 1970, covering the territory of present-day Pakistan. Its land borders were with Afghanistan, India and Iran, with a maritime border with Oman in the Gulf of Oman in the Arabian Sea.

Following its independence from British rule, the new Dominion of Pakistan comprised two non-contiguous regions, with East and West Pakistan geographically separated from each other by India. The western wing of Pakistan comprised three governor's provinces (the North-West Frontier, West Punjab and Sind), one chief commissioner's province (Baluchistan) along with the Baluchistan States Union, several independent princely states (notably Bahawalpur, Chitral, Dir, Hunza, Khairpur and Swat), the Karachi Federal Capital Territory, and the autonomous tribal areas adjoining the North-West Frontier Province. The eastern wing of the new country—known as East Pakistan—comprised the single province of East Bengal (which included the former Assamese district of Sylhet and the Chittagong Hill Tracts).

West Pakistan was the politically dominant division of the Pakistani union, despite East Pakistan making up more than half of its population. The eastern wing also had a disproportionately small number of seats in the Constituent Assembly. This administrative inequality between the two wings, coupled with the major geographical distance between them, was believed to be delaying the adoption of a constitution for Pakistan. To aid in diminishing the differences between the two regions, the Pakistani government decided to reorganize the country into two distinct provinces under the One Unit policy announced by then Pakistani Prime Minister Chaudhry Muhammad Ali on 22 November 1954.

In 1970, the President of Pakistan General Yahya Khan enacted a series of territorial, constitutional and military reforms. These established the provincial assemblies, state parliament, as well as the current provisional borders of Pakistan's four official provinces. On 1 July 1970, West Pakistan was abolished under the Legal Framework Order of 1970, which dissolved the One Unit policy and restored the four provinces. This order had no effect on East Pakistan, which retained the geopolitical position established in 1955. The following year saw a major war erupt between West Pakistan and Bengali nationalists in East Pakistan with their own guerrilla military, the Mukti Bahini. After a full-scale military intervention by India in support of the Bengali nationalists and the subsequent defeat of the Pakistan military, the province of East Pakistan seceded from its union with the Islamic Republic of Pakistan as the new People's Republic of Bangladesh.

== Political history ==
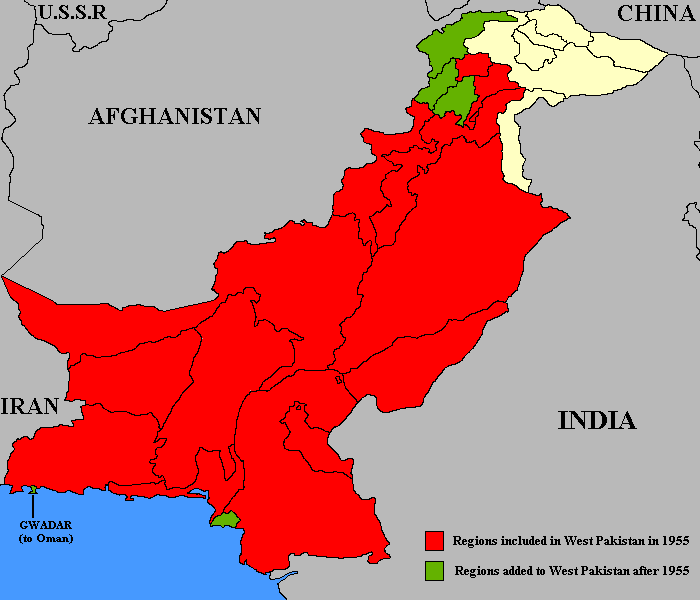
Geography of West Pakistan

=== Independence after British colonial period ===
At the time of the state establishment in 1947, the founding fathers of Pakistan participated in the Boundary Commission conference. Headed by Cyril Radcliffe, the commission was tasked with negotiating the arrangement, area division, and future political set up of Pakistan and India.

Pakistan was formed from two distinct areas, separated by 1,600 kilometres (1,000 miles) of India. The western state was composed of three Governor's provinces (North-West Frontier, West-Punjab and Sindh Province), one Chief Commissioner's province (Baluchistan Province), the Baluchistan States Union, several other princely states (notably Bahawalpur, Chitral, Dir, Hunza, Khairpur and Swat), the Federal Capital Territory (around Karachi) and the tribal areas. The eastern wing of the new country – East Pakistan – formed the single province of East Bengal, including the former Assam district of Sylhet and the Hill Tracts.

West Pakistan experienced great problems related to the divisions, including ethnic and racial friction, lack of knowledge, and uncertainty of where to demarcate the permanent borders. East Pakistan, Balochistan, and the North-West Frontier Province experienced little difficulty, but Southern Pakistani Punjab faced considerable problems that had to be fixed. Former East Punjab was integrated with the Indian administration and millions of Punjabi Muslims were expelled to be replaced by a Sikh and Hindu population and vice versa. The communal violence spread to all over the Indian subcontinent. Economic rehabilitation efforts needing the attention of Pakistan's founding fathers further escalated the problems.

The division also divided the natural resources, industries, economic infrastructure, manpower, and military might, with India as the larger share owner. India retained 345 million in population (91%) to Pakistan's 35 million (9%). Land area was divided as 78% to India and 22% to Pakistan. Military forces were divided up with a ratio of 64% for India and 36% for Pakistan. Most of the military assets – such as weapons depots and military bases – were located inside India; facilities in Pakistan were mostly obsolete, and they had a dangerously low ammunition reserve of only one week. Four divisions were raised in West Pakistan, whilst one division was raised in East Pakistan.

=== Parliamentary democracy ===
Jacqueline Kennedy visiting West Pakistan, c. 1960.

From the time of its establishment, the State of Pakistan had the vision of a federal parliamentary democratic republic form of government. With the founding fathers remaining in West Pakistan, Liaquat Ali Khan was appointed the country's first prime minister, with Mohammad Ali Jinnah as Governor-General. West Pakistan claimed the exclusive mandate over all of Pakistan, with the majority of the Pakistan Movement's leading figures in West Pakistan. In 1949, the Constituent Assembly passed the Objectives Resolution and the Annex to the Constitution of Pakistan, paving the road to a Westernized federal parliamentary republic. The work on parliamentary reforms was constituted by the constituent assembly the year after, in 1950.

The western section of Pakistan dominated the politics of the new country. Although East Pakistan had over half of the population, it had a disproportionately small number of seats in the Constituent Assembly. This inequality of the two wings and the geographical distance between them was believed to be holding up the adoption of a new constitution. To diminish the differences between the two regions, the government decided to reorganise the country into two distinct provinces.

Under the One Unit policy announced by Prime Minister Muhammad Ali Bogra on 22 November 1954, the four provinces and territories of western Pakistan were integrated into one unit to mirror the single province in the east. The state of West Pakistan was established by the merger of the provinces, states, and tribal areas of West Pakistan. The province was composed of twelve divisions and the provincial capital was established at Karachi. Later the state capital moved to Lahore, and it was finally established in Islamabad in 1965. The province of East Bengal was renamed East Pakistan with the provincial state capital at Dhaka (Dacca).

Clashes between West Pakistan and East Pakistan soon erupted, further destabilising the entire country. The two states had different political ideologies and different lingual cultural aspect. West Pakistan had been founded on the main basis of a parliamentary democracy (and had a parliamentary republic form of government since 1947), with Islam as its state religion. In contrast, East Pakistan had been a socialist state since the 1954 elections, with state secularism proclaimed. West Pakistan sided with the United States and her NATO allies, whilst East Pakistan remained sympathetic to the Soviet Union and her Eastern Bloc. Pakistan's 1956 constitution validated the parliamentary form of government, with Islam as state religion and Urdu, English and Bengali as state languages. The 1956 constitution also established the Parliament of Pakistan as well as the Supreme Court of Pakistan.

Ethnic and religious violence in Lahore, which began in 1953, spread all over the country. Muhammad Ali Bogra, prime minister of Pakistan, declared martial law in Lahore to curb the violence. This inter-communal violence soon spread to India, and a regional conflict put West Pakistan and India in a war-threatening situation. The prime ministers of Pakistan and India held an emergency meeting in Lahore.

=== Military dictatorships ===
From 1947 to 1959, the government was only partially stable. Seven prime ministers, four governors-general, and one president were forcefully removed either by constitutional coup or by military coup. The One Unit program was met with harsh opposition, civil unrest, and political disturbance. Support for the Muslim League and Pakistan Socialist Party in the upcoming elections threatened Pakistan's technocracy. The Muslim League and Socialist Party gained momentum after the League's defeat in the 1954 elections, and the Socialist Party were challenging for the constituencies of the President Iskandar Mirza's Republican Party. Relations with the United States deteriorated, with the US assessing that democracy in both states was failing.

A US-backed military coup d'état was launched in 1958 by the Pakistan Army command. The Urdu-speaking class and the Bengali nation were forcefully removed from the affairs of West Pakistan. With the imposition of martial law led by then-Army Commander-in-Chief General Ayub Khan, the state capital was moved from Karachi to Army General Combatant Headquarters (The GHQ) at Rawalpindi in 1959, whilst the federal legislature was moved to Dacca. In 1963, Rawalpindi had become in effect a federal capital; a new city was planned and constructed, finally completing in 1965. In 1965, the state capital was finally re-located in Islamabad.

=== Dissolution in 1970 ===
On contrary perception, the provinces did not benefit from economic progress, but the One Unit program strengthened the central government. In West Pakistan, the four provinces also struggled hard for the abolition of One Unit which caused injustices to them as it was imposed on them.

The provisional powerful committees pressured the central government through the means of civil disobedience, violence on street, raising slogans against the martial law, and attacks on government machines such as police forces. For several weeks, the four provinces worked together and guided the "One Unit Dissolution Committee", towards resolving all outstanding issues in time set by the Yahya government. Finally, the committee's plan went into effect on 1 July 1970, when West Pakistan's "One Unit" was dissolved, and all power was transferred to the provinces of Balochistan, the North West Frontier Province, Punjab and Sindh.

In the 1970 general elections (held in December 1970), the Bengali Awami League under Mujibur Rahman won an overall majority of seats in Parliament and all but 2 of the 162 seats allocated to East Pakistan. The Awami League advocated greater autonomy for East Pakistan but the military government did not permit Mujib-ur-Rahman to form a government.

East Pakistan became the independent state of Bangladesh on 16 December 1971. The term West Pakistan became redundant.

== Demographics ==
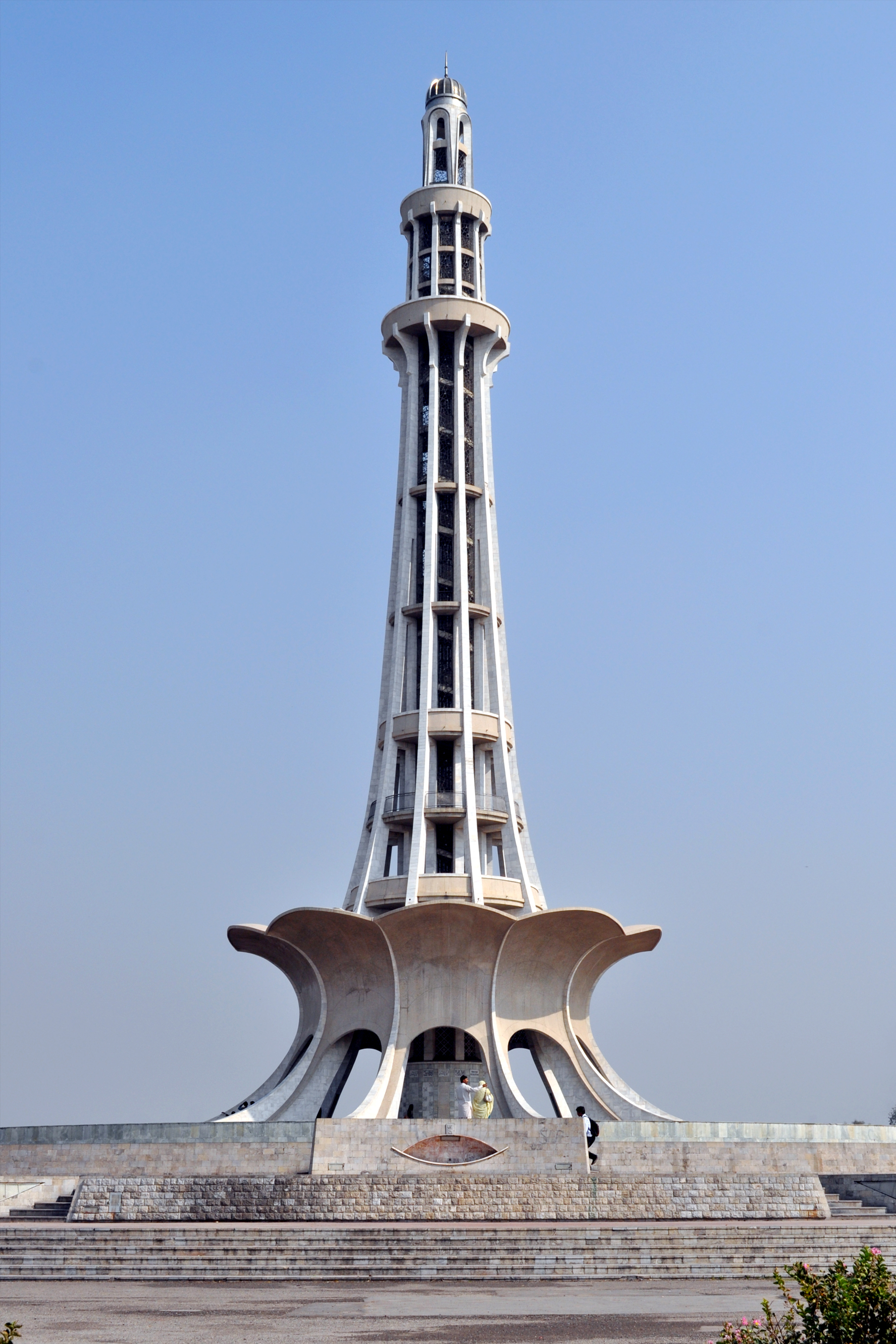
Minar-e-Pakistan

The total population of the region that composes West Pakistan was approximately 29.6 million as per the 1941 census. (Note: 1941 figure taken from census data by combining the total population of all administrative divisions that compose the region of contemporary Pakistan, including Punjab, (Note: 1941 figure taken from census data by combining the total population of all districts (Lahore, Sialkot, Gujranwala, Sheikhupura, Gujrat, Shahpur, Jhelum, Rawalpindi, Attock, Mianwali, Montgomery, Lyallpur, Jhang, Multan, Muzaffargargh, Dera Ghazi Khan), one tehsil (Shakargarh – then part of Gurdaspur District), one princely state (Bahawalpur), and one tract (Biloch Trans–Frontier) in Punjab Province, British India that ultimately fell on the western side of the Radcliffe Line. See 1941 census data here: Immediately following the partition of India in 1947, these districts and tract would ultimately make up the subdivision of West Punjab, which also later included Bahawalpur. The state that makes up this region in the contemporary era is Punjab, Pakistan.) Sindh, (Note: 1941 figure taken from census data by combining the total population of all districts (Dadu, Hyderabad, Karachi, Larkana, Nawabshah, Sukkur, Tharparkar, Upper Sind Frontier), and one princely state (Khairpur), in Sindh Province, British India. See 1941 census data here:) Khyber Pakhtunkhwa, Balochistan, Azad Jammu and Kashmir, (Note: 1941 figure taken from census data by combining the total population of two districts (Mirpur and Muzaffarabad) and one Jagir (Poonch) in the Princely State of Jammu and Kashmir that ultimately would be administered by Pakistan, in the contemporary self-administrative territory of Azad Jammu and Kashmir. See 1941 census data here:) and Gilgit–Baltistan. (Note: 1941 figure taken from census data by combining the total population of one district (Astore) and one agency (Gilgit) in the Princely State of Jammu and Kashmir that ultimately would be administered by Pakistan, in the contemporary administrative territory of Gilgit–Baltistan. See 1941 census data here:))

According to the 1961 census, the total population of Pakistan was 93 million, with 42.8 million residing in West Pakistan and 50 million residing in East Pakistan. East Pakistan hence made up around 55% of Undivided Pakistan's population whilst remaining 45% was in West Pakistan. West Pakistan also had a marginally faster growing population than East Pakistan.

=== Literacy rate ===
The literacy rate in Pakistan was 19.2%, in which East Pakistan had a literacy rate of 21.5% while West Pakistan had a literacy rate of 16.9%.

=== Ethnic groups ===
The major ethnic groups of West Pakistan was made up of Punjabis (62%), Pashtuns, Sindhis, Muhajirs, and Balochis.

=== Migration ===
During British India's partition, it was estimated that 15 million were displaced, and nearly more than 2 million consisting of Hindus, Muslims and Sikhs were killed in the deadly riots. During the period between 1947 and 1950, 8.6 million Muslims had moved to specially Pakistan's West Punjab region and about 6.7 million Hindus and Sikhs had gone the other way to India's East Punjab region and thus changing the demography of Pakistan drastically and resulting in overwhelming Muslim majority to this region.

=== Religion ===
With the exception of the Federally Administered Tribal Areas, all administrative divisions in the region that would compose West Pakistan after independence collected religious data, with a combined total population of 27,266,001, for an overall response rate of 92 percent. Similar to the contemporary era, where censuses do not collect religious data in Azad Jammu and Kashmir and Gilgit–Baltistan, the total number of responses for religion is slightly smaller than the total population, as detailed in the table breakdown below.

According to the 1961 census, in West Pakistan, Muslims made up 97.2% of the population, Christians 1.4%, and the remaining 1.4% belonging to other religions.

Religious groups in West Pakistan (1941 Census)
| Religious group | West Pakistan | | Punjab | | Sindh | | Khyber Pakhtunkhwa | | Balochistan | | AJK | | Gilgit– Baltistan | |
| Religious group | Total Population | Percentage | Pop. | % | Pop. | % | Pop. | % | Pop. | % | Pop. | % | Pop. | % |
|---|---|---|---|---|---|---|---|---|---|---|---|---|---|---|
| Islam | 21,113,214 | 77.43% | 13,022,160 | 75.06% | 3,462,015 | 71.52% | 2,788,797 | 91.8% | 785,181 | 91.53% | 939,460 | 87.54% | 115,601 | 99.62% |
| Hinduism (Note: Including Ad-Dharmis) | 3,981,565 | 14.6% | 2,373,466 | 13.68% | 1,279,530 | 26.43% | 180,321 | 5.94% | 54,394 | 6.34% | 93,559 | 8.72% | 295 | 0.25% |
| Sikhism | 1,672,753 | 6.13% | 1,530,112 | 8.82% | 32,627 | 0.67% | 57,939 | 1.91% | 12,044 | 1.4% | 39,910 | 3.72% | 121 | 0.1% |
| Christianity | 432,724 | 1.59% | 395,311 | 2.28% | 20,304 | 0.42% | 10,889 | 0.36% | 6,056 | 0.71% | 136 | 0.01% | 28 | 0.02% |
| Tribal | 37,603 | 0.14% | —N/a | —N/a | 37,598 | 0.78% | —N/a | —N/a | 3 | 0% | 0 | 0% | 2 | 0% |
| Jainism | 13,215 | 0.05% | 9,520 | 0.05% | 3,687 | 0.08% | 1 | 0% | 7 | 0% | 0 | 0% | 0 | 0% |
| Zoroastrianism | 4,253 | 0.02% | 312 | 0% | 3,841 | 0.08% | 24 | 0% | 76 | 0.01% | 0 | 0% | 0 | 0% |
| Judaism | 1,180 | 0.004% | 7 | 0% | 1,082 | 0.02% | 71 | 0% | 20 | 0% | 0 | 0% | 0 | 0% |
| Buddhism | 266 | 0.001% | 87 | 0% | 111 | 0% | 25 | 0% | 43 | 0.01% | 0 | 0% | 0 | 0% |
| Others | 19,228 | 0.07% | 19,128 | 0.11% | 0 | 0% | 0 | 0% | 11 | 0% | 89 | 0.01% | 0 | 0% |
| Total responses | 27,266,001 | 91.98% | 17,340,103 | 100% | 4,840,795 | 100% | 3,038,067 (Note: Religious data only collected in North West Frontier Province, and not in the Federally Administered Tribal Areas. Total responses to religion includes North West Frontier Province, and total population includes both North West Frontier Province and the Federally Administered Tribal Areas, both administrative divisions which later amalgamated to become Khyber Pakhtunkhwa.) | 56.1% | 857,835 | 100% | 1,073,154 | 100% | 116,047 | 100% |
| Total population | 29,643,600 | 100% | 17,340,103 | 100% | 4,840,795 | 100% | 5,415,666 | 100% | 857,835 | 100% | 1,073,154 | 100% | 116,047 | 100% |

== Government ==
1950 film about West Pakistan

West Pakistan went through many political changes, and had a multiple political party system. West Pakistan's political system consisted of the popular influential Left-wing sphere against elite Right-wing circles.

=== Parliamentary republic ===
Since independence, Pakistan had been a federal parliamentary constitutional monarchy (even as of today, the parliamentary system is the official form of government of Pakistan) with a Prime minister as the head of the government and a Monarch as the head of state in a ceremonial office.

The 1956 Constitution provided the country with Parliamentary form of Government and the office of President was inaugurated the same year. The career civil service officer Major-General (retired) Iskander Mirza became the country's first President, but the system did not evolve for more than the three years, when Mirza imposed the martial law in 1958. Mirza appointed army commander-in-chief General Ayub Khan as Chief Martial Law Administrator; he later turned his back on the President and exiled him to Great Britain after the military government was installed.

The Supreme Court of Pakistan was a judicial authority, a power broker in country's politics that played a major role in minimising the role of parliament. The Supreme Court was moved to Islamabad in 1965 and Chief Justice Alvin Robert Cornelius re-located the entire judicial arbiter, personnel and high-profile cases in Islamabad. The Supreme Court building is one of the most attractive places in Islamabad, yet the most largely beautiful building in the state capital.

This provisional parliament had no lasting effects of West Pakistan's affairs but it was a ceremonial legislature where the lawmakers would gather around to discuss non-political matters. In 1965, the legislative parliament was moved to Islamabad after Ayub Khan built a massive capitol. The assembly was renamed as the Parliament of Pakistan and staffed only with technocrats.

=== Governor and chief minister ===
The office of Governor of West Pakistan was a largely ceremonial position but later Governors wielded some executive powers as well. The first Governor was Mushtaq Ahmed Gurmani, who was also the last Governor of West Punjab. Ayub Khan abolished the Governor's office and instead established the Martial Law Administrator of West Pakistan (MLA West).

The office Chief Minister of West Pakistan was the chief executive of the state and the leader of the largest party in the provincial assembly. The first Chief Minister was Abdul Jabbar Khan who had served twice as Chief Minister of the Khyber Pakhtunkhwa Province prior to independence. The office of Chief Minister was abolished in 1958 when Ayub Khan took over the administration of West Pakistan.

==== Governors of West Pakistan ====
| Tenure | Governor of West Pakistan | Party Background | Form of Government |
|---|---|---|---|
| 14 October 1955 – 27 August 1957 | Mushtaq Ahmed Gurmani | Muslim League | Democratic government |
| September 1957 – 12 April 1960 | Akhter Husain | Independent | Martial Law |
| 12 April 1960 – 18 September 1966 | Amir Mohammad Khan | Muslim League | Martial Law |
| 18 September 1966 – 20 March 1969 | General Muhammad Musa | Independent | President's Rule |
| 20 March 1969 – 25 March 1969 | Yusuf Haroon | Civilian Government | President's Rule |
| Tenure Term | Martial Law Administrator | Type of Government | Service in effect |
| 25 March 1969 – 29 August 1969 | Lieutenant-General Attiqur Rahman | Martial Law | Pakistan Army |
| 29 August 1969 – 1 September 1969 | Lieutenant-General Tikka Khan | Martial Law | Pakistan Army |
| 1 September 1969 – 1 February 1970 | Air Marshal Nur Khan | Martial Law | Pakistan Air Force |
| 1 February 1970 – 1 July 1970 | Lieutenant-General Attiqur Rahman | Martial Law | Pakistan Army |
| 1 July 1970 | Province of West Pakistan dissolved | | |

==== Chief ministers of West Pakistan ====
| Tenure | Chief Minister of West Pakistan | Political Party |
|---|---|---|
| 14 October 1955 – 16 July 1957 | Dr Khan Sahib | Pakistan Muslim League/Republican Party |
| 16 July 1957 – 18 March 1958 | Sardar Abdur Rashid Khan | Republican Party |
| 18 March 1958 – 7 October 1958 | Nawab Muzaffar Ali Khan Qizilbash | Republican Party |
| 7 October 1958 | Office of Chief Minister abolished | |

=== Local government ===
The twelve divisions of West Pakistan province were Bahawalpur, Dera Ismail Khan, Hyderabad, Kalat, Khairpur, Lahore, Malakand, Multan, Peshawar, Quetta, Rawalpindi, and Sargodha; all named after their capitals except the capital of Malakand was Saidu, and Rawalpindi was administered from Islamabad. The province also incorporated the former Omani enclave of Gwadar following its purchase in 1958, and the former Federal Capital Territory (Karachi) in 1958; the latter in 1960 forming a new division in its own right.

In 1970, the Martial Law Office was dissolved by General Yahya Khan who disestablished the state of West Pakistan. On 1 July 1970, the provisional assemblies of Balochistan, Punjab, Sindh, and Khyber Pakhtunkhwa, Office of Prime minister, and much of the civil institutions were revived and re-established by the decree signed by Yahya Khan. The four provinces and four administrative units retained their current status and local governments were constitutionally established in 1970 to manage and administer the provisional autonomy given to the provinces in 1970.

== Geography ==
West Pakistan was extremely diverse in terms of geography, climate, and variety of wildlife. North-Western West Pakistan was mountainous, Punjab and Sindh were semi-arid, and the Baluchistan region in particular was predominantly desert. West Pakistan had a varied relief, consisting as it does of plains, plateaux and mountains watered by the Indus River and its tributaries. Climatically, West Pakistan had a continental type of climate without extensive rainfall. Due to its low rainfall, the main crops of West Pakistan were wheat, millets, and cotton and any crop that did not require much water.

== Administration ==
West Pakistan Province Comprises in 12 divisions, 45 districts and 6 agencies.

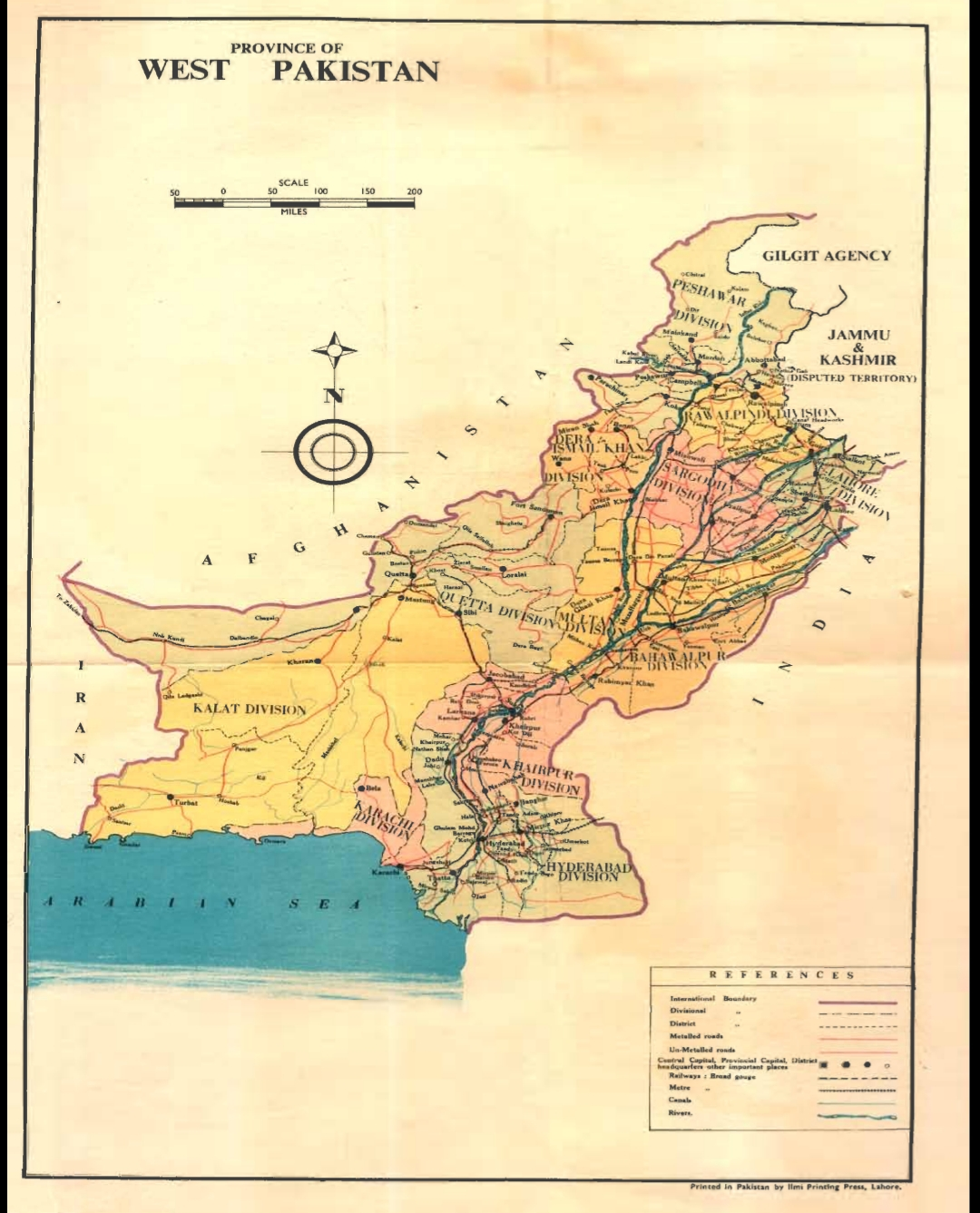
Administration Division Map West Pakistan Province

The administration of West Pakistan Province is given below:

Administration: West Pakistan Province
| Division | Districts | Agencies |
|---|---|---|
| Lahore Division | Lahore; Gujranwala; Sheikhupura; Sialkot | N/A |
| Rawalpindi Division | Campbellpur; Rawalpindi; Jhelum; Gujrat | N/A |
| Multan Division | Multan; Dera Ghazi Khan; Muzaffargarh; Montgomery | N/A |
| Bhawalpur Division | Bhawalpur; Bhawalnagar; Rahimyar Khan | N/A |
| Sargodha Division | Sargodha; Lyallpur; Mianwali; Jhang | N/A |
| Peshawar Division | Peshawar; Mardan; Hazara; Kohat | Malakand Agency; Mohmand Agency; Khyber Agency; Khurram Agency |
| Dera Ismail Khan Division | Dera Ismail Khan; Banu | South Waziristan Agency; North Waziristan Agency |
| Hyderabad Division | Hyderabad; Tharparkar; Dadu; Sanghar; Thatta | N/A |
| Khairpur Division | Khairpur; Sukkur; Jacobabad; Larkana; Nawabshah | N/A |
| Karachi-Bela Division(Created in 1960) | Karachi; Las Bela | N/A |
| Quetta Division | Quetta-Pashin; Sibi; Loralai; Zhob; Chagai | N/A |
| Kalat Division | Kalat; Makran; Kharan | N/A |

== Domestic affairs ==
=== Days of disintegration ===
The One Unit policy was regarded as a rational administrative reform that would reduce expenditure and eliminate provincial prejudices. West Pakistan formed a seemingly homogeneous block, but in reality it comprised marked linguistic and ethnic distinctions. The four provinces did not quite fit official definitions of a single nation.

The Sindhi and Urdu-speaking class in Sindh Province revolted against the One Unit policy. The violence spread to Balochistan Province, Khyber-Pakhtunkhwa and Punjab Province. The One Unit policy was a failure in West Pakistan, and its survival was seen as improbable. However, with the military coup of 1958, trouble loomed for the province when the office of Chief Minister was abolished and the President took over executive powers for West Pakistan.

=== Influence of socialism ===
Due to West Pakistan's close relations with the United States and the capitalist states, the influence of socialism had far more deeper roots in the West Pakistan population. The population favoured socialism but never allied with communism. The Pakistan Socialist Party had previously lost support due to its anti-Pakistan clauses during the time of the pre-independence movement. However, despite initiatives to improve the population during the Ayub Khan's government, the poor masses did not enjoy the benefits and reforms that were enjoyed by the middle and gentry classes of Pakistan.

After the Indo-Pakistani war of 1965, the cultural revolution, resentment, hostility towards the government began to arise when the population felt that "Kashmir cause" was betrayed by President Ayub Khan. Problems further mounted after Foreign minister Zulfikar Ali Bhutto was sacked and vowed to take a revenge. After gathering and uniting the scattered democratic socialist and Marxist masses, Bhutto founded the Pakistan Peoples Party in 1967. The socialists tapped a wave of antipathy against the United States-allied president. The socialists integrated in poor and urban provinces of West Pakistan, educating people to cast their vote for their better future, and the importance of democracy was widely sensed in the entire country. The socialists, under Bhutto's guidance and leadership, played a vital role in managing labour strikes and civil disobedience to challenge Khan's authority. The military government responded fiercely after arresting the senior socialists' leadership, notably Bhutto, Mubashir Hassan, and Malick Mirage. This sparked gruesome violence in West Pakistan, thereby increasing pressure on Khan that he was unable to endure. Khan called for a Round Table Conference in Rawalpindi, but socialists led by Bhutto refused to accept Ayub's continuation in office and rejected the 6 Point Movement for regional autonomy put forth in 1966 by East Pakistani politician Sheikh Mujibur Rahman.

In 1969, Khan handed over power to Army Chief of Staff General Yahya Khan, who promised to hold elections within two years. Meantime, Bhutto extensively worked to gather and unite the country's left-wing organisations, which, under Bhutto's leadership, participated with full force and became vital players in the country's politics.

== Foreign relations ==
=== Afghanistan ===
The long border between West Pakistan and Afghanistan was uneasy. This is due in part to the independent Pashtun tribes that inhabit the area. In addition, the physical boundary is uncertain: the 1893 Durand Line was used by West Pakistan to mark the border between the two countries, but Afghanistan has never recognised that frontier.

In 1955, diplomatic relations were severed with the ransacking of Pakistan's embassy. In 1961, the Pakistan Armed Forces and local Pashtun tribes suppressed an Afghan invasion in the Bajaur region of Pakistan.

=== India ===
West Pakistan had hostile relations with India, primarily due to aftermath of the 1947 independence from the British Empire and the issue of Kashmir.

=== People's Republic of China ===
West Pakistan had positive relations with the People's Republic of China, with whom it shared a small northern border.

In 1950, Pakistan was among the first countries to end official diplomatic relations with the Taiwanese Republic of China and recognise the PRC. After that, both countries maintained an extremely close and supportive relationship. The PRC provided economic, military and technical assistance to Pakistan during the Cold War, and the two countries considered each other to be close strategic allies.

=== Soviet Union ===
Relations varied from cool to extremely strained between West Pakistan and the Soviet Union. This was during the Cold War, and Pakistan's close ties with the United States came at the expense of relations with the Soviets.

Soviet-Pakistan relations were further eroded during the 1960 U-2 incident, when the Soviets shot down a US spyplane; Army Chief-of-Staff Ayub Khan had given the US permission to fly out of Peshawar Air Station on reconnaissance and covert surveillance missions over the Soviet Union.

The USSR backed India during the Indo-Pakistani War of 1971. The Soviets were the biggest supplier of military hardware to India at that time.

=== United States ===
The United States was one of the first nations to establish relations with Pakistan upon its independence.

Pakistan was allied with the US during the Cold War against the USSR. Pakistan was an integral member of the Southeast Asia Treaty Organization (SEATO) and the Central Treaty Organization (CENTO), both alliances opposed to the Soviet Union and communism.

A major factor in Pakistan's decision to ally with the West was their urgent need for aid. In the years that followed, the US supplied extensive economic, scientific, and military assistance to Pakistan.

This close relationship continued through Pakistan's years of democracy and military rule. Relations only soured after West Pakistan had dissolved into Pakistan, when the left-oriented Pakistan Peoples Party came to power in 1971.

== See also ==
- East Pakistan
- Indo-Pakistani War of 1971
- List of speakers of the West Pakistan Legislative Assembly
- Pakistan Movement
