= One Unit Scheme =

1955–1970 union of Pakistan's four western provinces

The One Unit program merged four Provinces of Pakistan into one single polity, West Pakistan.

The One Unit Scheme (Urdu: ون یونٹ; Bengali: এক ইউনিট ব্যবস্থা) was the reorganisation of the provinces of Pakistan by the central Pakistani government. It was led by Prime Minister Mohammad Ali Bogra on 22 November 1954 and enacted on 30 September 1955. The government claimed that the programme would overcome the difficulty of administering the two non-contiguous, unequal polities of West and East Pakistan separated from each other by more than a thousand miles. To diminish the differences between the two regions, the 'One Unit' programme merged the four provinces of West Pakistan (West Punjab, Sind, the North-West Frontier Province (NWFP) and Baluchistan) into a single province to parallel the province of East Pakistan (now Bangladesh).

The One Unit program met with great resistance and grievances were raised by the four provinces after its establishment. As per scholar Julien Levesque, the One Unit project had mainly been pushed by the Punjabi elite of West Pakistan since 1953 with the aim of preventing politicians from East Pakistan from gaining power at the centre. The National Awami Party successfully sponsored a bill in the National Assembly calling for its dissolution and providing for regional autonomy. This led to the military takeover of the national government. The One Unit programme remained in effect until 1970. Finally, President General Yahya Khan imposed Legal Framework Order No. 1970 to end the One Unit program and reinstate the provincial status of the four provinces as of August 1947.

== Background ==
Following the failure to implement the Bogra Formula, PM Muhammad Ali Bogra began working towards the controversial One Unit program that integrated the Four Provinces into a single province West Pakistan, to equalize the western wing with the eastern wing, East Pakistan.

During this time, Malik Ghulam Muhammad's health began to deteriorate, and paralysis spread through his whole body, forcing him to take a 2 month leave of absence in 1955 to seek treatment in the United Kingdom. Iskander Mirza was appointed as acting governor-general on 7 August 1955. Soon after the appointment, Acting Governor-General Mirza began having confrontations with Prime Minister Bogra on regional disparity though both were Bengali and were from Bengal, and Mirza forced Prime Minister Bogra to resign, appointing him as the Pakistan Ambassador to the United States. On 12 August 1955, he invited Chaudhri Muhammad Ali, the Finance Minister, to take over the government as a prime minister. The One Unit policy was enacted on 30 September 1955 by the new Prime Minister Chaudhry Muhammad Ali. Mirza dismissed Malik Ghulam to take over his post on 6 October 1955 (just one day before his acting capacity ended), supported by the Constituent Assembly's legislators (as Ghulam Muhammad was seen as despotic).

== History ==
Pakistan was conceived by philosopher Sir Muhammad Iqbal in 1930 (uniting the four states of the northwestern British Indian Empire), the country was established on 14 August 1947, directly resulting from the Pakistan Movement led by Muhammad Ali Jinnah. Since then, the country had been without a consolidated written constitution, and all Pakistan's state affairs had been run under constitutional acts of the British Indian Empire, such as the Government of India Act 1935 and the Indian Independence Act 1947.

The Government had prolonged difficulty in administering East Bengal, with its border with Eastern India and Burma, and the four provinces, which bordered Western India, Iran, China, and Afghanistan.

One Unit was conceived by then-Governor-General Malik Ghulam Muhammad and drafting was completed by then-chief Minister Mumtaz Daultana. The first official announcement about it was made on 22 November 1954. Rationalizing the framework, Bogra enumerated the benefits of having one unit or province:

"There will be no Bengalis, no Punjabis, no Sindhis, no Pathans, no Balochis, no Bahawalpuris (referring to inhabitants of the princely state of Bahawalpur), no Khairpuris (referring to inhabitants of the princely state of Khairpur). The disappearance of these groups will strengthen the integrity of Pakistan."

Prime Minister Chaudhry Muhammad Ali implemented the framework of the One Unit program on 14 October 1955 after Pakistan National Assembly passed a bill merging all of West Pakistan into a single province on 30 September 1955.

1. It would end the curse of provincial prejudices.

2. It would allow the development of backward areas.

3. It would reduce administrative expenses.

4. It would make it easier to draw up a new constitution.

5. It would give East and West Pakistan maximum autonomy.

(The reasons given to the Assembly for adopting the One Unit Scheme by Iskander Mirza in September 1955.)

After the 1954 general election, the four provinces and Tribal Areas were merged in the western wing. The province was composed of twelve divisions and the provincial capital was established at Lahore. The province of East Bengal (including Sylhet and the Chittagong Hill Tracts) was renamed East Pakistan with the provincial capital at Dacca. The federal government moved the country's capital in the beginning of the year 1959 from Karachi to the army headquarters of Rawalpindi (serving as provisional capital until the town planning of Islamabad was carried out and completed).

West Pakistan formed a single and united political entity but with marked linguistic and ethnic distinctions. The One Unit policy was regarded as an administrative reform that would reduce expenditure and help eliminate ethnic and parochial prejudices. However, with the military coup of 1958, trouble loomed for the province when the office of Chief Minister was abolished and the President claimed executive power over West Pakistan. The province of West Pakistan was dissolved on 1 July 1970 by President General Yahya Khan.

== Bibliography ==
- Talbot, Ian (1998), Pakistan: A Modern History, St. Martin's Press, ISBN 978-0-312-21606-1
