= I. I. Chundrigar =

Prime Minister of Pakistan in 1957

- ابراہیم اسماعایل چندرگر
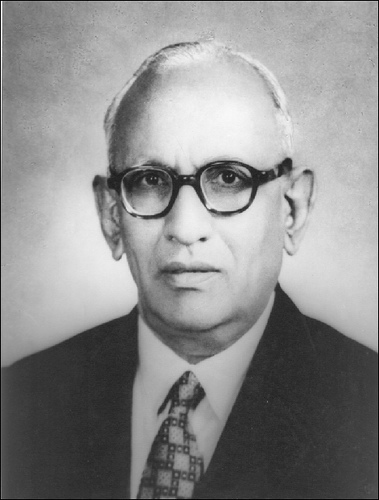

6th Prime Minister of Pakistan
- In office 17 October 1957 – 11 December 1957
- President: Iskander Mirza
- Preceded by: Huseyn Suhrawardy
- Succeeded by: Firoz Khan Noon

Minister for Law and Justice
- In office 12 August 1955 – 9 August 1957
- Prime Minister: Huseyn Suhrawardy; Chaudhri Muhammad Ali
- Preceded by: Huseyn Suhrawardy
- Succeeded by: Amir Azam Khan

4th Leader of the Opposition
- In office 16 December 1957 – 1 October 1958
- Preceded by: Huseyn Shaheed Suhrawardy
- Succeeded by: Sardar Bahadur Khan

Governor of West Punjab
- In office 24 November 1951 – 2 May 1953
- Chief Minister: M. Daultana
- Preceded by: Abdur Rab Nishtar
- Succeeded by: M. Aminuddin

Governor of North-West Frontier Province
- In office 17 February 1950 – 23 November 1951
- Chief Minister: A. Q. Khan
- Preceded by: Mohammad Khurshid
- Succeeded by: Khwaja Shahabuddin

Pakistani Ambassador to Afghanistan
- In office 1 May 1948 – 17 February 1950
- Prime Minister: Liaquat Ali Khan

Minister of Commerce and Trade
- In office 15 August 1947 – 1 May 1948
- Prime Minister: Liaquat Ali Khan

Minister of Commerce and Industry
- In office 2 September 1946 – 15 August 1947
- President: List: Louis Mountbatten (1947) Archibald Wavell (1946–47)
- Vice President: Jawaharlal Nehru
- Preceded by: Post created
- Succeeded by: Syama Prasad Mukherjee

Member of the Bombay Legislative Assembly
- In office 1937 – 1 September 1946
- Governor: List: Sir John Colville (1943–46) The Earl of Scarbrough (1937–43)
- Parliamentary group: Muslim League (Nationalist Group)
- Constituency: Muhammadan Urban
- Majority: Muslim League

President of Pakistan Muslim League
- In office 17 October 1957 – 11 December 1957
- Preceded by: Muhammad Ali
- Succeeded by: Nurul Amin (Took presidency in 1967)

President of the Supreme Court Bar Association
- In office 1958–1960

Personal details
- Born: Ibrahim Ismail Chundrigar; 15 September 1897 Godhra, Bombay Presidency, British India
- Died: 26 September 1960 (aged 63) London, England, United Kingdom
- Cause of death: Haemorrhage
- Resting place: Society Graveyard, Karachi, Sindh, Pakistan
- Citizenship: British India (1897–1947); Pakistan (1947–1960)
- Party: Muslim League (1947-1960)
- Other political affiliations: All-India Muslim League (1936–1947)
- Children: 3 sons, including Abdullah, Abu Bakr, and Iqbal.
- Education: University of Bombay (BA in Phil. and LLB)
- Profession: Lawyer, diplomat

Ismail Ibrahim Chundrigar (Note: Urdu: ابراہیم اسماعیل چندریگر) (15 September 1897 – 26 September 1960) was a Pakistani politician who served as the sixth prime minister of Pakistan, appointed in this capacity on 17 October 1957. He resigned due to a vote of no confidence on 11 December 1957, against him.

He was trained in constitutional law at the University of Bombay and was one of the Founding Fathers of the Dominion of Pakistan. Having served for just 55 days, Chundrigar's tenure is the third shortest served in the parliamentary history of Pakistan, after those of Shujaat Hussain and Nurul Amin, who served as prime minister for 54 and 13 days, respectively.

== Biography ==
=== Early life and law practice ===
Ismail Ibrahim Chundrigar was born in Godhra, Gujarat, in British India on 15 September 1897. He was an only child.

Chundrigar moved to Bombay for his higher studies. He attended the University of Bombay where he earned a BA degree, and later the LLB degree in 1920. From 1929 till 1932, Chundrigar was a lawyer for the Ahmedabad Municipal Corporation.

From 1932 until 1937, Chundrigar practiced civil law, and moved to practice and read law at the Bombay High Court in 1937, where he established his reputation. During this time, he became acquainted with Muhammad Ali Jinnah, sharing similar ideology and political views.

In 1935, Chundrigar was chosen by the Muslim League to give a response to the Government of India Act 1935 introduced by the British government in India. Notably, concerning the role of the Governor-General as head of state, Chundrigar denied that the Governor-General enjoyed the powers supposedly granted by the Act.

From 1937 till 1946, Chundrigar practiced in the Bombay High Court.

=== Legislative career in India and Pakistan Movement ===
Chundrigar stood for the Bombay Legislative Assembly as a Muslim League candidate in the 1937 provincial elections, and was elected from the Ahmedabad district rural constituency. From 1940 to 1945, he was president of the Bombay provincial Muslim League.

In 1946, he was elected to the assembly from a Muslim urban constituency in Ahmedabad. He was appointed Commerce Minister under the presidential administrations of the Viceroys of India, Archibald Wavell (1946) and Louis Mountbatten (1946-47). Peter Lyon, a reader emeritus in international relations, described Chundrigar as a "close supporter" of Mohammad Ali Jinnah in the Pakistan Movement.

== Public service in Pakistan ==
=== Diplomacy and governorships ===
After the partition of India by the act of the British Empire that established Pakistan, Chundrigar endorsed Liaquat Ali Khan's bid for the premiership and was retained as the commerce minister in the administration of Prime Minister Liaquat Ali Khan on 15 August 1947.

In May 1948, Chundrigar left the Commerce Ministry and was appointed Pakistan's Ambassador to Afghanistan. Although his appointment was favorably received in Afghanistan, Chundrigar was at odds with the Afghan government (supported by India as early as 1949) over the issue of Pakistan's north-west border with Afghanistan.

Chundrigar's tenure as ambassador was short. He was recalled to Pakistan by the Foreign Office, which viewed his inability to understand the Pashtun culture as a possible factor in fracturing Afghan-Pakistan relations. In 1950, Chundrigar was appointed governor of Khyber-Pakhtunkhwa, a position he held until 1951. A Cabinet reshuffle in 1951 allowed him to be appointed the governor of Punjab but he resigned in 1953 due to differences with Governor-General M.G. Muhammad when he enforced martial law at the request of Prime Minister K. Nazimuddin to control violent religious riots that occurred in Lahore, Pakistan.

=== Law ministry in coalition administration ===
In 1955, Chundrigar was invited to join the central government of a three-party coalition: the Awami League, the Muslim League, and the Republican Party. He was appointed minister of law and justice. During this time, he also acted as a leader of the opposition.

At the National Assembly, he established his reputation as more of a constitutional lawyer than a politician, and gained a lot of prominence in public for his arguments in favour of parliamentarianism when he pleaded the case of "Maulvi Tamizuddin vs. Federation of Pakistan".

== Premiership (1957) ==
After the resignation of Prime Minister Suhrawardy in 1957, Chundrigar was nominated as the Prime Minister and was supported by the Awami League, the Krishak Sramik Party, the Nizem-i-Islam Party, and the Republican Party. However, this coalition of mixed parties weakened Chundrigar's authority to run the central government, and divisions within the coalition would soon hamper his efforts to amend the Electoral College. On 18 October 1957, Chundrigar became the Prime Minister of Pakistan, receiving his oath of office from Chief Justice M. Munir.

At the first session of the National Assembly, Chundrigar presented his plan to reform the Electoral College which was met with great parliamentary opposition by even his Cabinet ministers from the Republican Party and the Awami League. With the Republican Party leaders—party president Feroz Khan and President of Pakistan Iskander Mirza—exploiting and manipulating the opponents of the Muslim League, a successful vote of no-confidence in the National Assembly led by the Republicans and the Awami Party effectively ended Chundrigar's term. He resigned on 11 December 1957.

Chundrigar served the third-shortest term of any Prime Minister in Pakistan: 17 October 1957 – 11 December 1957, 55 days into his term.

== Death and reputation ==
In 1958, Chundrigar was appointed president of the Supreme Court Bar Association, a position he held until his death. In 1960, Chundrigar traveled to Hamburg where he addressed the International Law Conference and suffered a hemorrhage while visiting in London. For treatment, he was taken to the Royal Northern Hospital and suddenly died. His body was brought back to Karachi in Pakistan, where he was buried in a local cemetery.

In his honour, the government of Pakistan renamed McLeod Road in Karachi after him.

== Notes ==
Political offices
Preceded by Mohammad Ibrahim Khan Jhagra; Acting	Governor of Khyber Pakhtunkhwa; 1950–1951	Succeeded by Khwaja Shahabuddin
Preceded by Abdur Rab Nishtar	Governor of Punjab; 1951–1953	Succeeded by Mian Aminuddin
Preceded by Huseyn Shaheed Suhrawardy	Prime Minister of Pakistan; 1957	Succeeded by Feroz Khan Noon
