= Homoquinolinic acid =

Chemical compound

Clinical data
- Other names: Homoquinolinate
- ATC code: None

Identifiers
- IUPAC name: 3-(Carboxymethyl)-2-pyridinecarboxylic acid
- CAS Number: 490-75-5
- PubChem CID: 3080554
- ChemSpider: 2338312
- PDB ligand: QM1 (PDBe, RCSB PDB)
- CompTox Dashboard (EPA): DTXSID70197658
- ECHA InfoCard: 100.164.902

Chemical and physical data
- Formula: C_{8}H_{7}NO_{4}
- Molar mass: 181.147 g·mol^{−1}
- 3D model (JSmol): Interactive image
- SMILES: c1cc(c(nc1)C(=O)O)CC(=O)O
- InChI: InChI=1S/C8H7NO4/c10-6(11)4-5-2-1-3-9-7(5)8(12)13/h1-3H,4H2,(H,10,11)(H,12,13); Key:HQPMJFFEXJELOQ-UHFFFAOYSA-N

Homoquinolinic acid (HQA) is a potent excitotoxin that is a conformationally restricted analogue of N-methyl-D-aspartate (NMDA) and a partial agonist of the main/glutamate site of the NMDA receptor, with some selectivity for NR2B subunit-containing receptors. It is approximately equipotent to NMDA and about five times more potent than quinolinic acid as an agonist of the NMDA receptor. HQA has also been found to label a novel yet uncharacterized binding site, which can be distinguished from the NMDA receptor with the use of 2-carboxy-3-carboxymethylquinoline (CCMQ), a selective ligand of the uncharacterized site.

== See also ==
- Aspartate
- Ibotenic acid
- Tetrazolylglycine
