= Iskander Mirza =

Pakistani politician and military general (1899–1969)

Iskander Mirza CIE, OBE
- ইস্কান্দার মির্জা اسکندر مرزا
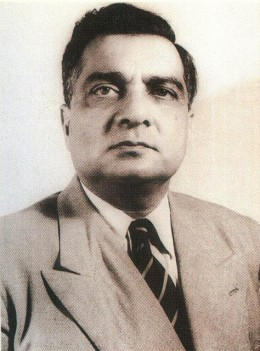
- Official portrait, c. 1956

1st President of Pakistan
- In office 23 March 1956 – 27 October 1958
- Prime Minister: List: Chaudhry Muhammad Ali (1956); Huseyn Shaheed Suhrawardy (1956–57); I. I. Chundrigar (1957); Feroz Khan Noon (1957–58); Ayub Khan; (Acting)
- Preceded by: Position established (Himself as Governor General of Pakistan)
- Succeeded by: Ayub Khan

4th Governor-General of Pakistan
- In office 7 August 1955 – 23 March 1956
- Monarch: Elizabeth II
- Prime Minister: Mohammad Ali Bogra (1955); Chaudhry Muhammad Ali (1955–56)
- Preceded by: Malik Ghulam Muhammad
- Succeeded by: Position abolished (Himself as President of Pakistan)

4th Minister for Interior of Pakistan
- In office 23 October 1954 – 7 August 1955
- Governor General: Malik Ghulam Muhammad
- Prime Minister: Mohammad Ali Bogra (1954–55)
- Preceded by: Moustaque Ahmead Gurmani
- Succeeded by: A. K. Fazlul Huq

1st Minister for Provinces and Frontiers Regions of Pakistan
- In office 23 October 1954 – 7 August 1955
- Governor General: Malik Ghulam Muhammad
- Prime Minister: Mohammad Ali Bogra (1954–55)
- Preceded by: Office established

4th Governor of East Bengal
- In office 15 May 1954 – 23 October 1954
- Governor General: Malik Ghulam Muhammad
- Chief Minister: A. K. Fazlul Huq
- Preceded by: Chaudhry Khaliquzzaman
- Succeeded by: Muhammad Shahabuddin (Acting)

1st Secretary of Defence
- In office 23 October 1947 – 15 May 1954
- Governors General: Muhammad Ali Jinnah (1947–48); Khwaja Nazimuddin (1948–51); Malik Ghulam Muhammad; (1951–54)
- Prime Minister: Liaquat Ali Khan (1947–51); Khwaja Nazimuddin (1951–53); Mohammad Ali Bogra (1953–54)
- Minister: Liaquat Ali Khan; Himself (Acting); Khwaja Nazimuddin; Mohammad Ali Bogra
- Preceded by: State established
- Succeeded by: Akhter Husain

Vice-President of the Republican Party
- In office 1956–1958
- President: Feroz Khan Noon

Acting Minister for Defence of Pakistan
- In office 16 October 1951 – 17 October 1951
- Preceded by: Md. L. A. Khan (1951)
- Succeeded by: Khwaja Nazimuddin (1951)

Personal details
- Born: Iskandar Ali Mirza; 13 November 1899 Murshidabad, Bengal Presidency, British India
- Died: 13 November 1969 (aged 70) London, England
- Resting place: Imamzadeh Abdullah, Tehran, Iran
- Citizenship: British India (1899–1947); Pakistan (1947–1958); United Kingdom (1958–1969)
- Party: Republican Party (1956–1958)
- Other political affiliations: Muslim League (1955–1956)
- Spouses: Rifaat Begum (m. 1922–1953) Nahid Mirza (m. 1954–1969)
- Children: 6
- Relatives: Nawabs of Murshidabad (paternal); Tyabji family (maternal)
- Education: Royal Military College, Sandhurst; Bombay University
- Civilian awards: Nishan-i-Lmar; Nishan-e-Pahlavi; Order of the Indian Empire

Military service
- Branch/service: British Indian Army (1920–1947); Pakistan Army (1947–1954)
- Years of service: 1920–1954
- Rank: Major-General
- Unit: 17th Horse (Poona Horse)
- Commands: Corps of Military Police; East Pakistan Rifles
- Battles/wars: Waziristan campaign (1936–1939); India–Pakistan war of 1947–1948
- Military awards: Order of the British Empire; General Service Medal

Iskander Ali Mirza (Note: Bengali: ইস্কান্দার আলী মির্জা Urdu: اسکندر علی مرزا) (13 November 1899 – 13 November 1969) was a Pakistani politician and military general who served as the fourth and last governor-general of Pakistan from 1955 to 1956, and as the first president of Pakistan from promulgation of the constitution in 1956 till his overthrow in a coup d'état in 1958. Declaring martial law and unilaterally abrogating the constitution on 7 October 1958, he appointed Ayub Khan as Chief Martial Law Administrator who later overthrew Mirza on 27 October 1958 and assumed the presidency.

Mirza was educated at the University of Bombay before attending the Royal Military College, Sandhurst. After military service in the British Indian Army, he joined the Indian Political Service and spent the most of his career as a political agent in the Western region of British India until elevated as Joint Secretary to the Government of India at the Ministry of Defence in New Delhi in 1946. Following the independence of Pakistan in 1947 as a result of the Partition of British India, Mirza was appointed the first Defence Secretary by prime minister Liaquat Ali Khan, only to oversee the military efforts in the first war with India in 1947, followed by the failed secession in Balochistan in 1948. In 1954, he was appointed the Governor of his home province of East Bengal by Prime Minister Mohammad Ali Bogra to control the law and order situation sparked by the popular language movement in 1952, but was later elevated as Interior Minister in the Bogra administration in 1955.

Playing a crucial role in the ousting of Governor-General Malik Ghulam Muhammad, Mirza assumed his position in 1955 and was elected as the first President of Pakistan when the first Constitution was promulgated in 1956. His presidency, however, was marked with political instability which saw his unconstitutional interferences in the civilian administration that led to the dismissal of four prime ministers in a mere two years. Facing challenges in getting the political endorsements and reelection for the presidency, Mirza surprisingly suspended the writ of the Constitution by imposing martial law against his own party's administration governed by Prime Minister Feroz Khan Noon on 8 October 1958, enforcing it through his army commander General Ayub Khan. Three weeks later, General Ayub ousted President Mirza when the situation between them escalated and sent him into exile. Mirza lived in the United Kingdom for the remainder of his life and was buried in Iran in 1969.

His legacy and image are viewed negatively by some Pakistani historians who believe that Mirza was responsible for weakening democracy and causing political instability in the country.

== Origins ==
=== Ancestral roots and family background ===
Sahibzada Iskandar Ali Mirza was born in Murshidabad, Bengal, in India on 13 November 1899, into an elite and wealthy aristocrat family who were titled as Nawab of Bengal and later after 1880, Nawab of Murshidabad. Mirza was the eldest child of Nawab Fateh Ali Mirza and Dilshad Begum (1875–1925). From his grandfather's ancestral roots, he was of Syed Iraqi Arab descent. The Nawab of Murshidabad family was an influential and wealthy feudal family in Bengal, with close ties to the British monarchy. His father, Fateh Ali Mirza, belonged to the ruling house of Murshidabad, grandson of the first Nawab Mansur Ali Khan. He was the descendant of Mir Jafar. Mirza's mother belonged to the Bombay-based Tyabji family of Cambay and was the niece of Congress president Badruddin Tyabji of the Sulaymani Bohra community.

=== Education, military and political service in British India (1920–47) ===
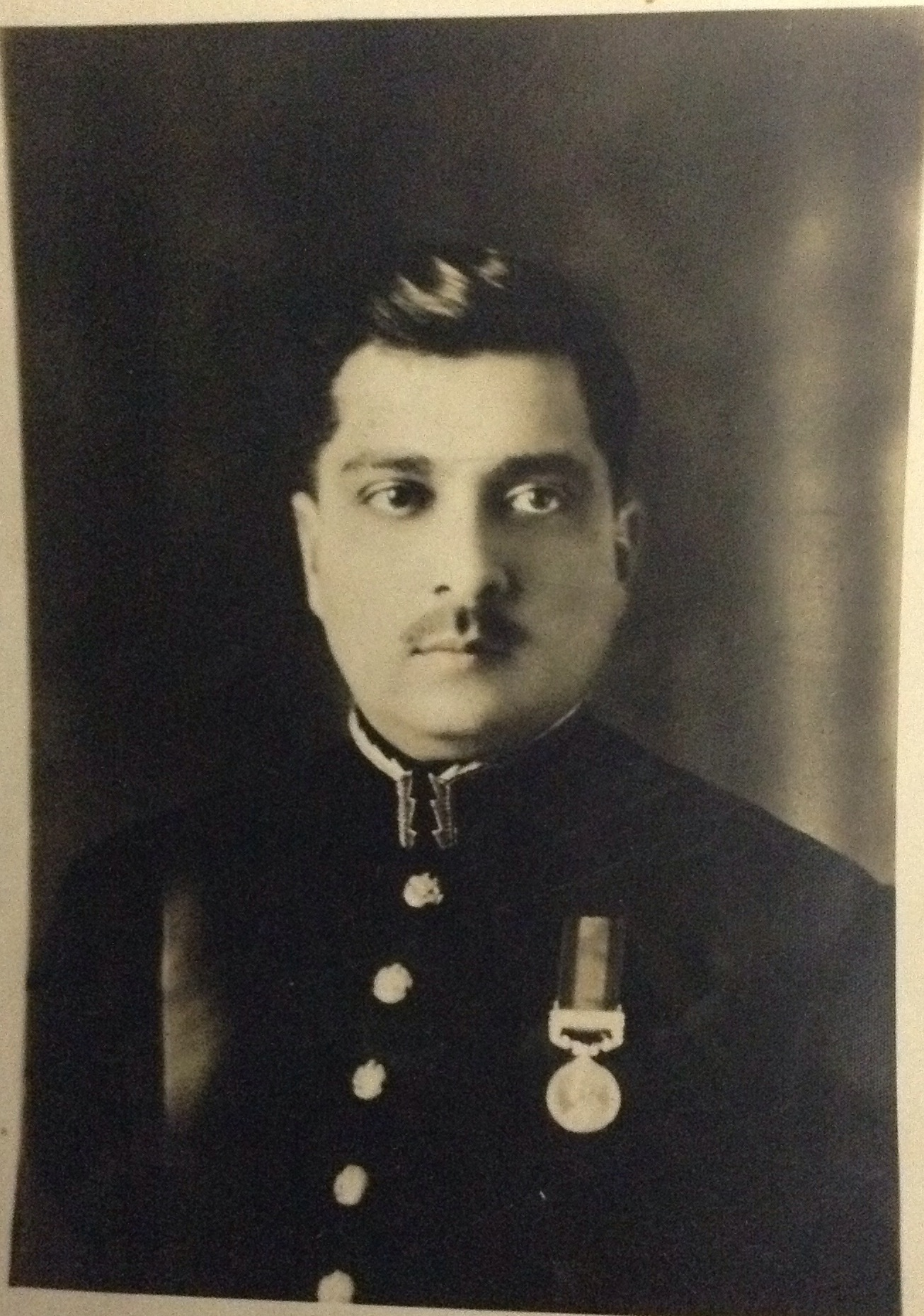
Iskander Mirza as 2nd-Lt in the British Indian Army, ca.1920.

==== Education ====
Mirza grew up and completed his schooling in Bombay, attending the Elphinstone College of the University of Bombay, but left the university to attend the Royal Military College in Sandhurst when he was selected by the British Governor-General for the King's Commission.

==== Military service ====
Mirza was the first Indian graduate of the military college, and gained his commission in the British Indian Army as a 2nd Lt. on 16 July 1920. He was commissioned in the 33rd Cavalry (17th Poona Horse). As was customary for newly commissioned British Indian Army officers, he was initially attached for a year to the second battalion of the Cameronians (Scottish Rifles). On 16 July 1921, he was promoted to lieutenant and was assigned to command a platoon on 30 December 1921.

His military career was spent in the Military Police. In spite of hailing from Bengal, his military career was mostly spent in the violent North-West Frontier Province of India, participating in the Waziristan war in 1920. After the campaign, he was transferred to the 17th Poona Horse (Queen Victoria's Own), as an army inspector but left active service to join the Indian Political Service (IPS) in August 1926.

==== Indian Political Service ====
His first assignment was a posting in Aligarh in what is now Uttar Pradesh as an assistant commissioner before posting as a political agent in Hazara in the North West Frontier Province. He received his promotion to captain on 17 October 1927.

During his time spent fighting for the British Empire against Pashtun Freedom Fighters in Waziristan, he learnt to speak Pashto fluently for his deployment in the North-West Frontier. From 1928 to 1933, Mirza spent time as a political agent in the troubled Tribal Belt, having served as an assistant commissioner in the districts of Dera Ismail Khan in April 1928, Tonk in May 1928, Bannu in April 1930, and Nowshera in April 1931. In 1931, Captain Mirza was appointed a district officer and was later posted as deputy commissioner at Hazara in May 1933, where he served for three years until a posting to Mardan as assistant commissioner from October 1936 (deputy commissioner from January 1937). Promoted to major on 16 July 1938, he became the political agent of the Tribal Belt in April 1938, stationed at Khyber. He remained there until 1945.

Mirza was appointed and served as the political agent of Odisha and North West Frontier Province from 1945 until 1946. He was promoted to lieutenant-colonel on 16 July 1946. His ability to run the colonial administrative units had brought him to prominence that prompted the British Indian Government to appoint him as the Joint Secretary to the Government of India in New Delhi in 1946. In this position, he was responsible for dividing the British Indian Army into the future armies of Pakistan and India. Around this time, he became closer to Liaquat Ali Khan and began formatting political relations with the politicians of the Muslim League. About him Abdul Ghaffar Khan wrote: ""According to my instructions the mass movement was launched. A Muslim Deputy-Commissioner, Janab Iskander Mirza, avowing his traditional loyalty to the British, excelled his masters, beating to death Syed Akbar, a Khudai Khidmatgar. He went to the extent of poisoning vegetables in a Khudai Khidmatgar camp. Those who ate them were taken seriously ill. I would rather not expose his other crimes but would rather produce him before the Almighty, whom we all have to face on the Day of judgement."

== Political career in Pakistan ==
=== Defence Secretary (1947–54) ===
He was appointed as the first Defence Secretary in the Liaquat administration by the Prime Minister Liaquat Ali Khan, who relied on running the government on the British viceregal model with the close coordination of the civilian bureaucracy, the police, and the military. As Defence Secretary, he oversaw the military efforts in the first war with India in 1947, as well as witnessing the failed secession in Balochistan by Khan of Kalat.

In 1950, Mirza was promoted to two-star rank, having skipped the one-star promotion as brigadier, and upgraded his rank to major-general in the Pakistan Army by the promotion papers approved by Prime Minister Ali Khan. He was appointed as acting-colonel commandant of the Military Police while serving as the Defence secretary in the Liaquat administration. In 1951, Prime minister Ali Khan appointed him as the director of the Department of Kashmir and Afghanistan Affairs (DKA).

His tenure as defense secretary also saw the deployment of Military Police in East Pakistan (now Bangladesh) as a result of the Bengali language movement, during which the East Pakistan Rifles fatally shot four student activists. Within a short span of time, the Military Police had control of the state and its commanding officer submitted the report of their course of action to Acting-Major General Iskander Mirza in 1954.

In 1951, he backed the Liaquat administration's decision of appointing the native chiefs of staff of the army, air force, and navy, and dismissed deputation appointments from the British military. For the four-star appointment, the Army GHQ sent the nomination papers to the Prime Minister's Secretariat that included four-senior major-generals in the race for the army command of the Pakistan Army: Major-General Iftikhar Khan, Major-General Akbar Khan, Major-General Ishfakul Majid, and Major-General N.A.M. Raza.

Initially, it was Major-General Iftikhar Khan who was promoted to four-star rank and selected to be appointed as the first native commander of the army but died in an airplane crash en route after finishing the senior staff officers' course in the United Kingdom. All three remaining major-generals were bypassed including the recommended senior-most Major-General Akbar Khan and Major-General Ishfakul Majid due to Major-General Mirza's lobbying for the army selection when he presented convincing arguments to Prime Minister Ali Khan to promote the junior-most Major-General Ayub Khan to the post despite the fact that his name was not included in the nomination list. Ayub's papers of promotion were controversially approved and was appointed as the first native Commander-in-Chief of the Pakistan Army with a promotion to the rank of Lieutenant General (acting full General) on 17 January 1951 by Prime Minister Ali Khan.

With Ayub becoming the army chief, it marked a change in the military tradition of preferring native Pakistanis and ending the transitional role of British Army officers.

=== Governorship of East Bengal and Cabinet Minister (1954–55) ===
Iskander Mirza (right) meeting the Shah of Iran, as the Governor General of Pakistan

Due to rapid political instability in East Bengal, Mirza was relieved as Defence Secretary and took over the governorship of East Bengal, in an appointment approved by then Governor-General Sir Malik Ghulam on 29 May 1954.

On 1 June 1954, Mirza took over the Government of East Bengal from Chief Minister A. K. Fazlul Huq as part of the governor's rule that dismissed the United Front. He imposed martial law, backed by the East Pakistan Rifles, and dismissed the East Bengal Legislative Assembly.

After landing at the then Dacca Airport, Mirza sharply announced in the Bengali language to the Pakistan media representatives, that he would not hesitate to use force in order to establish peace in the province, and personally threatening Maulana Bhashani of shooting him.

Iskander Mirza ruled East Pakistan with an iron fist, having arrested 319–659 political activists in his first week, including Sheikh Mujibur Rahman and Yusuf Ali Chowdhury.

By mid-June 1954, the number of arrests reached 1,051, including 33 assembly members and two Dhaka University professors. His authoritative actions had sown a permanent seed of hatred for the Pakistani government in the hearts of the people of East Pakistan. Amid criticism at the public level in Pakistan, Mirza was relieved from the post of the Governorship to East Bengal to Muhammad Shahabuddin in October 1954. On 24 October 1954, he was appointed as Interior Minister in the Bogra administration of Prime Minister Mohammad Ali Bogra. During this time, he had maintained close political ties to the United States's establishment and was backed by Governor-General Sir Malik Ghulam for this post, which Mirza only remained at until 7 August 1955.

As an Interior Minister, he provided strong political advocacy for the controversial geopolitical program, One-unit, which he faced strong criticism on by West Pakistan's politicians and the public in general.

=== Governor-General of Pakistan (1955–56) ===
In the Bogra administration, he also took care of the matters of the Commonwealth and Kashmir affairs ministry as he had gained major political influence in the administration in 1955. During this time, Governor-General Malik Ghulam survived another attack of paralysis that made him unable to talk and walk, seeking treatment in the United Kingdom on a two-month leave.

Appointed only as acting governor-general since 7 August 1955, Mirza dismissed Sir Malik Ghulam to take over his post on 6 October 1955, and forced Prime Minister Bogra to resign when he appointed him as the Pakistan Ambassador to the United States. On 12 August 1955, he invited Muhammad Ali, the Finance Minister, to take over the government as a prime minister.

== Presidency (1956–58) ==
Iskander Mirza being sworn in as the first President of Pakistan.

The newly constituted Electoral College unanimously elected Mirza as the interim president upon the promulgation of the first set of the Constitution on 23 March 1956. The coalition of the Awami League, the Muslim League, and the Republican Party endorsed his presidency.

The Constitution drives the country's system of government towards parliamentarianism, with executive powers vested under the elected Prime Minister while the president served as a ceremonial head of state.

On 12 September 1956, he established and became vice-president of the Republican Party that was in direct conflict with the Muslim League, mainly due to disagreements on the idea of republicanism and conservatism. Unable to keep the substantial pressure on Mirza's Republic Party eventually led the Muslim League's successful demand for the resignation of Prime Minister Muhammad Ali on 12 September 1956.

Upon these developments, President Mirza invited the Awami League to form the central government that appointed Huseyn Suhrawardy as the Prime Minister, who made an alliance with the Republican Party, to take over charge of the government.

Shah of Iran's first state visit to Pakistan

Despite both being ethnic Bengalis and hailing from West Bengal, the two leaders had very different views of running the central government and both leaders were in brief conflict, causing harm to the unity of the nation. Prime Minister Suhrawardy found it extremely difficult to govern effectively due to the issue of One Unit, alleviating the national economy, and President Mirza's constant unconstitutional interference in the Suhrawardy administration.

President Mirza demanded the resignation of Prime Minister Suhrawardy and turned down his request to seek a motion of confidence at the National Assembly. Threatened by President Mirza's dismissal, Prime Minister Suhrawardy tendered his resignation on 17 October 1957 and was succeeded by I. I. Chundrigar but he too was forced to resign in a mere two months.

President Mirza had widely lacked the parliamentary spirit, distrusting the civilians to ensure the integrity and sovereignty of the country. His unconstitutional interference in the civil administration made the elected prime ministers effectively unable to function, as he had dismissed four elected prime ministers in a matter of two years. On his last nomination, he appointed Feroz Khan as the seventh Prime Minister of the country, who had been supported by the Awami League and the Muslim League.

=== Martial law ===
After the legislative elections held in 1954, the Awami League had been successfully negotiating with the Muslim League for a power-sharing agreement to form the national government against the Republican Party.

By 1958, I.I. Chundrigar and A.Q. Khan had successfully reorganized the Muslim League that was threatening the reelection and the political endorsement for Mirza for his second term of the presidency. Furthermore, the Republican Party, presided by Prime Minister Sir Feroze Khan, had been under pressure over the electoral reforms issue at the National Assembly. Upon witnessing these developments, President Mirza ordered the mass mobilization of the military and imposed emergency rule in the country after declaring martial law against his own party's administration led by Prime Minister Feroze Khan by abrogating the writ of the Constitution and dissolving the national and provisional assemblies at midnight on 7/8 October 1958.

In the morning of 8 October 1958, President Mirza announced via national radio that he was introducing a new constitution "more suited to the genius of the Pakistan nation", as he believed democracy was unsuited to Pakistan "with its 15% literacy rate". Upon abdicating, Mirza took the nation into confidence, saying that:

Three weeks ago, I (Iskander Mirza) imposed martial law in Pakistan and appointed General Ayub Khan as Supreme Commander of the [Armed Forces] and also as Chief Martial Law Administrator.... By the grace of God... This measure which I had adopted in the interest of our beloved country has been extremely well received by our people and by our friends and well wishers abroad... I have done best to administer in the difficult task of arresting further deterioration and bringing order out of chaos... In our efforts to evolve an effective structure for future administration of this country... Pakistan Zindabad, Pakistan Zindabad!

— President Iskander Mirza, abdicating on 1958.10.27,

This martial law imposed by the country's first president was the first example of martial law in Pakistan, which would continue until the dissolution of East Pakistan in 1971. Iskander Mirza appointed then-Army Commander of the Pakistan Army, General Ayub Khan, as the Chief Martial Law Administrator (CMLA), which proved his undoing within three weeks.

=== Dismissal and end of presidency ===
The two-man rule political regime was evolved under President Mirza and his appointed chief martial law administration and then-army chief General Ayub Khan. However, the two men had very different points of view on running the government with the new situation, even though they were responsible for bringing about the change.

I did not mean to do it.... The martial law would be for the shortest possible duration until the new elections....

— President Mirza, 1958,

President Mirza had not envisaged any change in his previous powers; he wanted to retain the ability to maneuver things in keeping with his own whims. Judging from the situation, the things however had changed as the time and situation both were demanding the complete solution. General Ayub Khan came to an understanding that the real political power rested with the support of the military, and within a week of enforcing martial law, President Mirza realized the delicate position he got himself into. In an interview with Dawn, President Mirza regretted his decision saying: "I did not mean to do it" while offering assurances that martial law would be for the shortest possible duration.

In 1958, President Mirza accepted the resignation of Vice-Admiral M.S. Choudhri, replacing him with Vice-Admiral A.R. Khan as the new naval chief but civil-military relations continued to be a dominant factor between President Mirza and General Ayub Khan.

Mirza unilaterally made Ayub Khan Prime Minister and appointed a new cabinet of technocrats for him.

The new administration did not satisfy CMLA Ayub Khan who had more control in the administration than President Mirza. Ayub dispatched the military unit to enter the presidential palace on midnight of 26–27 October 1958 and placed him in an airplane to be exiled to England. Subsequently, Admiral A. R. Khan and four army and air force generals: Azam, Amir, Wajid, and Asghar Khan were instrumental in the dismissal of President Mirza.

== Exile and death ==
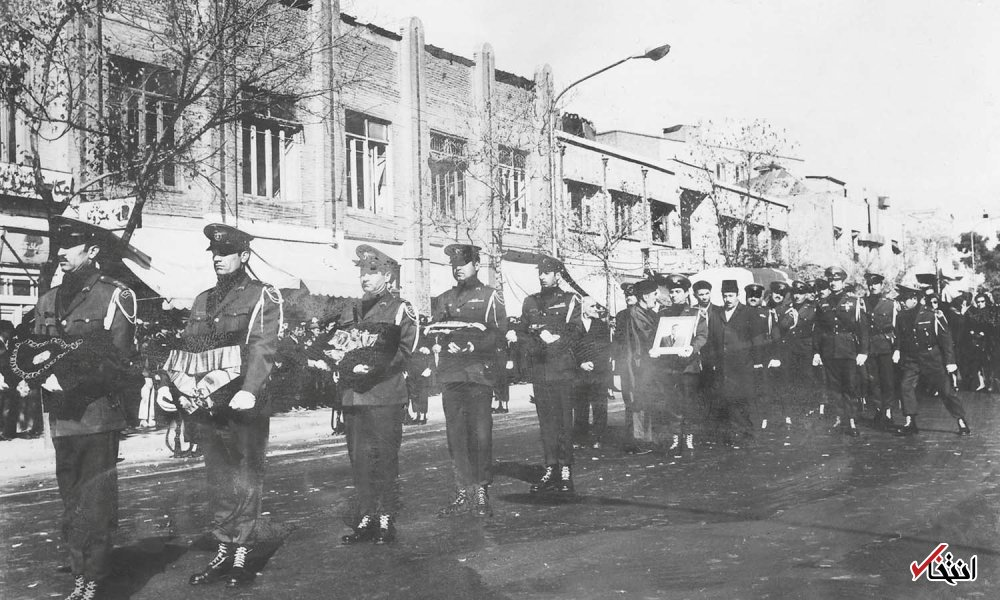
Mirza's state funeral in the Sepahsalar Mosque, Tehran

Exiled in 1959, Mirza lived the remainder of his life in exile in London, England, where he financially struggled running a small Pakistani cuisine hotel until his death. It was reported widely by Pakistani media that despite hailing from a wealthy Nawab and aristocratic family, Mirza lived in poverty in England and his regular income was based on his retirement pension of £3,000 as a former military officer and president. Foreign dignitaries such as Ardeshir Zahedi, Shah of Iran, Lord Inchcape, Lord Hume, and Pakistani billionaires in London made his life in exile tolerable.

At the London hospital where he died, he once said to his wife, Nahid: "We cannot afford medical treatment, so just let me die."

He died of a heart attack on 13 November 1969, his 70th birthday. Yahya Khan, the president of Pakistan, denied him a burial in East Pakistan. Mohammad Reza Pahlavi, the Shah of Iran, sent his personal plane to London to bring President Mirza's body to Tehran, where he was given a state funeral. Hundreds of Iranians, including Prime Minister Abbas Hoveyda, and Pakistani expatriates in Iran bade farewell and offered their prayers.

The funeral ceremony was marred by the absence of Iskander Mirza's relatives living in Pakistan. The military government barred them from leaving Pakistan in time despite the best efforts of Ardeshir Zahedi, Iran's foreign minister, and President Iskander Mirza's friends in Pakistan and Iran. There are unfounded rumors that after the Islamic Revolution in Iran (1979), his grave was desecrated.

=== Family ===
Mirza was married twice: his first marriage took place on 24 November 1922, when he married an Iranian woman, Rifaat Begum (1907–23 March 1967). The couple had two sons and four daughters.

Humayun Mirza is the only surviving son of Iskander Mirza. He was born in Poona, India, and was educated at Doon School. He also studied in the U.K., before moving to the U.S., where he earned his MBA from Harvard. He married Josephine Hildreth, the daughter of Horace Hildreth, the U.S. ambassador to Pakistan. He retired from the World Bank in 1988. He lives in Bethesda, Maryland. He is the author of a book "From Plassey to Pakistan: The Family History of Iskander Mirza." Humayun's younger brother, Enver Mirza, had died in a plane crash in 1953.

In October 1954, while in West Pakistan, Mirza's second marriage took place in Karachi after he fell in love with an Iranian aristocrat, Nahid Amirteymour (1919–2019), daughter of Amirteymour Kalali. She was a close friend of Begum Nusrat Bhutto. It was this friendship that brought Zulfikar Ali Bhutto into the political arena of Pakistan.

== Legacy ==
Iskandar Ali Mirza is often criticized by Pakistani historians for imposing martial law. Historians have noted that Mirza held that Pakistanis "lacked the parliamentary spirit and because of the lack of training in the field of democracy and the low literacy rate among the masses, democratic institutions cannot flourish in Pakistan". He believed that the judicial authorities should be given the same powers which they used to enjoy during the British Indian Empire.

Mirza's political ideology reflected secularism, and an image of internationalism, strongly advocating religious separation in state matters. Mirza had never had a high opinion of politicians. He was well known for his conviction that the politicians were destroying the country. He felt that in order to work towards real and responsible democracy, the country must have what he called "controlled democracy".

Historians also asserted that Mirza's role as the head of state led him to play an active part in power politics, building an image of being a kingmaker in the country's politics. Mirza took full advantage of the weaknesses of politicians and played them against each other, first offsetting the influence of the Muslim League by creating the Republican Party.

Your services are indispensable for Pakistan. When the history of our country is written by objective historians, your name will be placed even before that of Mr. Jinnah....

— Zulfikar Ali Bhutto, 1958,

During his short span of four years as the head of state, four prime ministers were changed, three of them were his appointees, while the only popularly elected Bengali prime minister was dismissed. Iskander Mirza is thus widely held responsible for the instability that brought the active role of Pakistan armed forces into politics.

By the 1950s, Mirza had moved his personal wealth to Pakistan which was confiscated by the government of Pakistan when he was exiled, and it was reported by Hindustan Times in 2016, that his family estate in Murshidabad, West Bengal, was left in ruins.

=== Honours ===
(ribbon bar, as it would look today)

- India General Service Medal (1909)
- King George V Silver Jubilee Medal – 1935
- King George VI Coronation Medal – 1937
- Officer of the Order of the British Empire (OBE) – 1939
- Companion of the Order of the Indian Empire (CIE) – 1945
- Pakistan Medal – 1948
- Queen Elizabeth II Coronation Medal – 1953
- Grand Collar of the Order of Pahlavi of the Empire of Iran – 1956
- Order of the Supreme Sun, 1st Class of the Kingdom of Afghanistan – 1958

== Notes ==
Political offices
New office	Defence Secretary of Pakistan; 1947–1954	Succeeded by Akhter Husain
Preceded by Chaudhry Khaliquzzaman	Governor of East Bengal; 1954	Succeeded by Muhammad Shahabuddin; Acting
Preceded by Mushtaq Ahmed Gurmani	Minister of the Interior; 1954–1955	Succeeded by Fazlul Huq
Preceded by Malik Ghulam Muhammad	Governor-General of Pakistan; 1955–1956	Position abolished. Himself as first President of Pakistan
New title	President of Pakistan; 1956–1958	Succeeded by Ayub Khan
