= Mushtaq Ahmed Gurmani =

Pakistani politician (1905–1981)

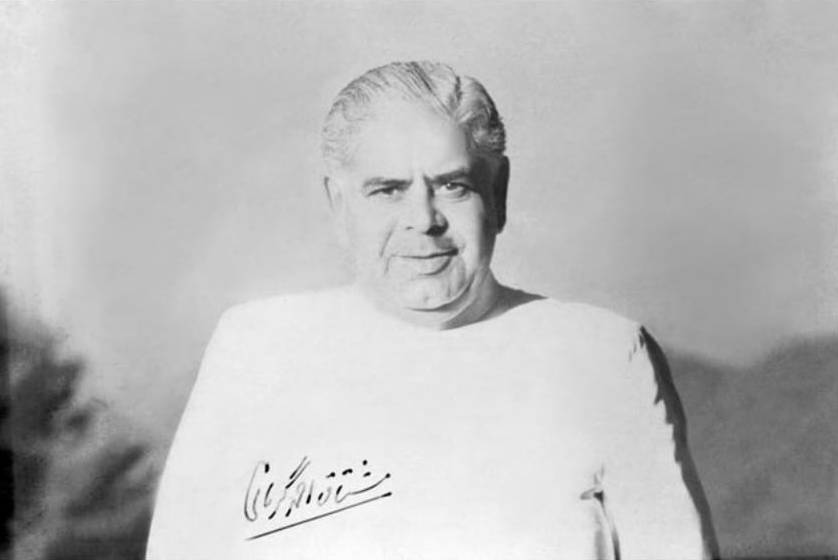

1st Governor of West Pakistan
- In office 14 October 1955 – 27 August 1957
- Monarch: Elizabeth II
- President: Iskander Mirza
- Preceded by: Office established
- Succeeded by: Akhter Husain

3rd Minister of Interior
- In office 26 November 1951 – 24 October 1954
- Prime Minister: Khawaja Nazimuddin; Mohammad Ali Bogra
- Preceded by: Khwaja Shahabuddin
- Succeeded by: Iskander Mirza

Personal details
- Born: 1905 Kot Addu, Punjab, British India (present day Punjab, Pakistan)
- Died: 1981 (aged 75–76)

Mushtaq Ahmed Gurmani (Urdu: مشتاق احمد گورمانی) (1905 – 1981) was a Pakistani politician who served as the Governor of West Pakistan and Diwan of the Bahawalpur State. He was from Thatta Gurmani a small town 4 km from near Sinawan. After the partition of India and the accession of Bahawalpur, he served as a 'Minister without Portfolio' in the central Government of Pakistan in charge of the Ministry of Kashmir Affairs.

== Early life ==
Mian Mushtaq Ahmad Gurmani was born in a Gurmani Baloch family of village Thatha Gurmani, Kot Addu Tehsil, Muzaffargarh District, in the Punjab province of British India.

== Career ==
In his role as 'Minister without Portfolio' but in charge of Kashmir Affairs, he signed the Karachi Agreement of 1949 that established a ceasefire line between Pakistani and Indian areas of Kashmir, which later became known as the Line of Control. In 1951, he served as the Executive for Kashmir Affairs and Northern Areas and also served as Interior Minister of Pakistan from 1951 till 1954.

Between 1954 and 1957 he served as Governor of Punjab. In 1955, the post of Punjab Governor was abolished and Gurmani went on to become the first Governor of West Pakistan. Mushtaq Ahmed Gurmani belonged to the Gurmani Baloch tribe.

== Books ==
=== By him ===
- Kashmir, a survey, 1951.
- Agricultural crisis in Pakistan, speeches, 1957.

=== About him ===
- Nawab Mian Mushtaq Ahmad Gurmani: some personal traits and leadership by S. Qalb-i-Abid, 2017.

Political offices
| Preceded by Khwaja Shahabuddin | Interior Minister of Pakistan; 1951 – 1954 | Succeeded by Iskander Mirza |
| Preceded by Habib Ibrahim Rehmatullah | Governor of Punjab; 1954 – 1955 | Succeeded by Part of West Pakistan |
| Preceded by Office established | Governor of West Pakistan; 1955 – 1957 | Succeeded by Akhter Husain |
