= University of Makran =

Public university in Panjgur, Pakistan

University of Makran جامعہ مکران
- Type: Public
- Established: April 23, 2022; 4 years ago
- Affiliations: Higher Education Commission (Pakistan)
- Chancellor: Governor of Balochistan
- Vice-Chancellor: Dr. Mir Sadaat Baloch
- Students: 300
- Location: Noori Naseer Khan Chowk, Panjgur District Panjgur, Balochistan., Panjgur, Balochistan, Pakistan
- Campus: N/A
- Nickname: UoM
- Website: uomp.edu.pk

The University of Makran (UoM; Urdu: جامعہ مکران) is a public university located in Panjgur, Balochistan, Pakistan. It was initially established as a subcampus of the University of Turbat in Panjgur on October 6, 2020. An act for the establishment of the University of Makran was enacted by the provincial government of Balochistan and the institution became a fully-fledged university on April, 23th of 2022.

This university has an importance of education for the socio-economic development of Balochistan, equal other universities as University of Gwadar.

The University of Makran mutual collaboration and cooperation with University of Turbat in the areas of education, research, and co-curricular development.
