= Nurpur Noon =

Village in Punjab, Pakistan

Nurpur Noon نور پور نون
- Village
- Location in Pakistan
- Coordinates: 32°11′18″N 73°01′43″E
- Country: Pakistan
- Province: Punjab
- District: Sargodha

Nurpur Noon is a village near Bhalwal in Sargodha District, Punjab, Pakistan.

== Prominent people from Nurpur Noon ==
Nurpur Noon has produced some prominent politicians in the past, such as Malik Hayat Noon and his son, Feroz Khan Noon who served in the Viceroy's Council of India before independence and later, after the creation of Pakistan, served as the country's Foreign Minister and then Prime Minister of Pakistan in 1958.

Feroz Khan Noon and his wife Viqar-un-Nisa Noon both played main role in the accession of Gwadar to Pakistan. Taimur Noon is currently helping in Nurpur Noon.

Nurpur Noon Polo and Equestrian Club is located here.
