= Turbat (disambiguation) =

Turbat is a city in Balochistan province of Pakistan.

Turbat may also refer to the following;

== Places ==
=== Pakistan ===
- Turbat Tehsil, a sub-division in Kech District
- Turbat International Airport, an airport in Turbat city
- University of Turbat, a public institution in Turbat city

=== Iran ===
- Turbat-i-Haidari, a city in the eponymous county of Razavi Khorasan province
- Turbat-i-Shaikh Jam, a city in the eponymous county of Razavi Khorasan province

=== Israel ===
- Turbat el-Kubakiya, an old cemetery in the West Jerusalem
