= Gwadar Shipyard =

- Type: State-owned Enterprise
- Industry: Shipbuilding, Defence
- Headquarters: Gwadar, Balochistan, Pakistan
- Services: Shipbuilding, Ship repair
- Owner: Government of Pakistan

The Gwadar Shipyard is a planned shipbuilding and repair facility located in Gwadar, a port city in Balochistan, Pakistan. The project is a joint venture between the Government of Pakistan and the provincial government of Balochistan, formalized through a Memorandum of Understanding (MoU) signed in February 2021.

As of 2024, the project is in the planning stage. The 2023 Pakistani defense budget allocated Rs. 100 million for the shipyard's development. The project is expected to be completed within two to three years of the launch of construction.

== History ==
The potential of Gwadar to function as a significant deep-water seaport was initially recognized in 1954, even during its period under Omani control. However, it wasn't until 2007 that plans for constructing the port came to fruition. The port was officially inaugurated by Pervez Musharraf following four years of construction, with a total expenditure of $248 million. In 2021, Pakistan announced plans to establish a new shipyard in Gwadar. This project aims to revitalize the domestic commercial shipbuilding and repair industry, create employment opportunities and contribute to the economic development of the region. The Gwadar Shipyard is envisioned to be a major facility catering to not only Pakistan's needs but also those of neighboring countries.
