= Quetta Development Authority =

Municipal services agency for Quetta, Pakistan

- |اداره ترقیاتی کوئٹہ د کوټې پراختیایي اداره اداره انکشافی کویته

Agency overview
- Formed: 1978; 48 years ago
- Headquarters: Quetta, Pakistan
- Director General, QDA responsible: Niaz Ahmed Nichari
- Parent agency: Government of Balochistan
- Website: www.qda.gob.pk

The Quetta Development Authority is an agency of the Government of Balochistan, Pakistan. The authority is responsible for providing municipal services to the city of Quetta. The Authority was established in 1978.

== See also ==
- Gwadar Development Authority
- Balochistan Development Authority
