= Quetta Mass transit train =

Quetta Mass Transit Train

Overview
- Locale: Quetta, Balochistan, Pakistan
- Transit type: Urban rail transit
- Number of lines: 1 (Phase 1)
- Number of stations: TBA

The Quetta Mass Transit Train project is a proposed urban rail transit system for the city of Quetta, the provincial capital of Balochistan, Pakistan. The project aims to provide a modern, efficient, and sustainable mode of transportation to the residents of Quetta, addressing the growing need for public transport in the city.

== Background ==
Quetta, which has a population of about 0.5 million, lacks a public transport system, leading to traffic congestion, environmental pollution and high living costs.

== Project development ==
The Quetta Mass Transit Train initiative was originally part of the China-Pakistan Economic Corridor (CPEC) as decided in the 6th Joint Cooperation Committee (JCC) meeting in 2016. However, it was subsequently removed in the 7th JCC. Regardless of this change, the project received the green light from the Chief Minister of Balochistan, followed by a feasibility study.

=== Challenges and delays ===
The initiative encountered substantial setbacks and was temporarily suspended due to financial feasibility issues highlighted by a preliminary study. The government of Balochistan chose to reassess the mass transit alternatives, taking into account both railway and bus pathways.

As of April 2017, the feasibility of the project has been finalized, and the Balochistan government is considering moving ahead with the development.
