= From Memory =

1966 autobiography by Firoz Khan Noon

- Author: Firoz Khan Noon
- Language: English
- Subject: Firoz Khan Noon; Politics of Pakistan; Politics of British India
- Genre: Autobiography
- Publisher: Ferozsons
- Publication date: 1966
- Publication place: Pakistan
- Media type: Print
- Pages: 304

From Memory is a 1966 autobiography by Pakistani politician Firoz Khan Noon. Published by Ferozsons in Lahore, it is a memoir of Noon's life and public career in late colonial India and early Pakistan. A second edition was published in 1967 by Ferozsons in Lahore and C. Hurst in London.

== Synopsis ==
The book presents Noon's recollections of his upbringing in Punjab, his education in England, and his legal and political career before and after the Partition of India. The autobiography covers Noon's years as a minister in the Punjab, High Commissioner for India to the United Kingdom, member of the Viceroy's Executive Council, and later as governor, chief minister, foreign minister and prime minister in Pakistan.

The memoir mixes political reminiscence with personal anecdotes and literary quotations. It also discusses subjects including Kashmir, Gwadar, the Muslim League, and Noon's relations with figures such as Muhammad Ali Jinnah and Liaquat Ali Khan.

== Reception ==
From Memory was reviewed by P. J. Griffiths in International Affairs in 1968. A separate review on Pakistan Institute of International Affairs described the autobiography as readable and charming because of its anecdotes and its use of Persian, Urdu and Punjabi verses and proverbs, but argued that Noon left too much unsaid about important Punjabi political figures and included some undocumented statements of doubtful validity.
