= 99-year lease =

Historical maximum lease time

A 99-year lease, under historic English law, since widely received abroad, was traditionally seen as the longest practical term of a lease of real property without it being considered perpetual. While it is no longer a hard legal limit in most common law jurisdictions today, 99-year leases continue to be common as a matter of business practice. In some countries (such as Singapore) land reform legislation has resulted in most or all land being owned by the state to be leased to users, which often takes the form of a 99-year lease. In this case, the lease is often transferable and treated as essentially equivalent to ownership, at least to the extent that it is the main way in which one may purchase the more or less permanent use of land.

== The law ==
Under the traditional common law doctrine, the 99-year term was not literal, but merely an arbitrary time span beyond the life expectancy of any possible lessee (user) or lessor (owner).

William Blackstone (1723–1781, of Commentaries on the Laws of England fame) states that a lease was formerly limited to 40 years, although much longer leases (for at least 300 years, or at most 1000 years) were in use by the time of Edward III. The 40-year limit was based on the text The Mirror of Justices (book 2, chapter 27).

In the law of some US states, including Alabama a 99-year lease is the longest possible contract for real estate by statute, but many states such as California and New York allow infinite terms. In Kentucky, the maximum lease contract for real estate is 40 years.

Due to the influence of the ideas of Henry George at the time the Australian Capital Territory (ACT) was established in the early 20th century, all residential land in the ACT was held under 99-year Crown leases, the first of which expired in 2023.

The 99‑year lease term has also been used in a number of historic colonial and international territorial concessions. For example, the United Kingdom’s 1898 lease of the New Territories in Hong Kong and Germany’s 1898 lease of Kiautschou Bay, were both for 99 years—though such terms have appeared under both common law and civil law systems.

In Sabah, Malaysia, the state "Country Lease" (CL) is land classified outside of the town area, and leases are either freehold, 999, 99 or 60 years, a land law inherited from the time of the British North Borneo administration, although there are several restrictions for non-Sabahans and foreigners to own land. A similar 99-year lease also applied in neighbouring Sarawak, which inherited the Raj of Sarawak land law, although non-Sarawakians and foreigners are generally prohibited from owning land in Sarawak, with some exceptions to the general restrictions.

Different laws apply to the land tenure in West Malaysia and the Federal Territories, with some federally owned and reserved lands that have not yet been developed with planned development projects for certain reasons that may be leased to qualified parties for a period of not less than 3 years and not more than 99 years.

== Examples ==
- Destroyers-for-bases deal – leased old U.S. Navy destroyers to the United Kingdom in exchange for the right to construct U.S. Armed Forces bases in the British Empire, including Newfoundland, the British West Indies, and British Guiana.

=== Americas ===
- Boston Museum of Science – leased by the Boston municipal government to the Metropolitan District Commission
- Castaway Cay – leased to Disney by the Bahamian government in 1996
- Moffat Tunnel – leased to Union Pacific Railroad by the state of Colorado under a 99-year lease until 2025. A lease extension of 25 years was agreed to after the initial 99 years expired.
- Ontario Highway 407 Express Toll Route – leased to private company by the Ontario provincial government under Premier Mike Harris for C$3.1 billion.
- Panama Canal – Panama leased the canal and the surrounding zone to the United States during the 20th century. Returned to full Panamanian control by 1999 under the 1977 Torrijos–Carter Treaties.
- Robert F. Kennedy (RFK) Memorial Stadium – The United States House of Representatives successfully passed a bill on 28 February 2024 to grant Washington, D.C. control of the RFK Stadium property. The bill went to the United States Senate, where it unanimously passed on 21 December 2024, and was signed by President Joe Biden on 6 January 2025. This bill will allow the Washington, D.C. government to lease the stadium through December 2123.

=== Asia ===
- British Hong Kong – The Convention for the Extension of Hong Kong Territory resulted in the 99-year lease of the New Territories from the Qing Empire to the British Empire in 1898. Hong Kong Island and the Kowloon Peninsula had already been ceded to the British in perpetuity after the Opium Wars. Transferred to full control of the People's Republic of China in the 1997 Hong Kong handover.
- Hambantota International Port – Sri Lanka to China
- Kouang-Tchéou-Wan
- Public housing in Singapore – all HDB flats are sold with 99-year leases. Upon expiry of the lease, control reverts to the government of Singapore.

=== Africa ===
- Suakin Island – On 17 January 2018, as part of a rapprochement with Sudan, Turkey was granted a 99-year lease over Suakin Island. Turkey plans to restore the ruined Ottoman port city on the island.
- Diego Garcia – The United Kingdom announced the handover of the entirety of the British Indian Ocean Territory, including the island of Diego Garcia, to Mauritius in exchange for a 99-year lease on Naval Support Facility Diego Garcia in October 2024.

== See also ==
- 999-year lease – Quasi-permanent leasehold
- Ground rent – Rent for the ground where a tenant can do property development
- Lend-lease – WWII program to provide U.S. allies with free armaments
- Rule against perpetuities – Legal rule prohibiting very long temporary interests in property
- List of territory purchased by a sovereign nation from another sovereign nation
