= Balochistan Development Authority =

Department of Government of Balochistan, Pakistan

The Balochistan Development Authority (Note: Urdu:اداره ترقیاتی بلوچستان; Balochi: ادارہ توسعه بلوچستان; Pashto:د بلوچستان د پراختیا اداره; Dari: اداره انکشافی بلوچستان) is an agency of Government of Balochistan, Quetta. The authority was established in 1974 under the Balochistan Development Authority Act, 1974 passed by Balochistan Assembly. The authority works under the Department of planning and development to promote economic and industrial development in Balochistan.

== See also ==
- Gwadar Development Authority
- Quetta Development Authority
- Gadani ship-breaking yard
