= University of Gwadar =

Public university in Gwadar, Pakistan

Coordinates: 25.1895°N 62.3140°E

- گوادر ءِ دانشگاہ۔ جامعہ گوادر
- Motto: Knowledge, Wisdom, Service
- Type: Public
- Established: October 25, 2021; 4 years ago
- Affiliations: Higher Education Commission (Pakistan)
- Chancellor: Governor of Balochistan
- Vice-Chancellor: Prof. Dr. Abdul Razzaq Sabir
- Dean: Prof. Dr. Jan Muhammad (Acting)
- Students: 2000
- Location: Sarawan Avenue, New Town Phase IV, Gwadar, Balochistan, Pakistan
- Campus: N/A
- Nickname: UG
- Website: ug.edu.pk

The University of Gwadar (UG; Balochi: گوادر ءِ دانشگاہ, Urdu: جامعہ گوادر) is a public university located in Gwadar, Balochistan, Pakistan. It was initially established as a subcampus of the University of Turbat in Gwadar in September 2017. An act for the establishment of the University of Gwadar was enacted by the provincial government of Balochistan in November 2018, and the institution became a fully-fledged university on 25 October 2021. Professor Dr Abdul Razzaq Sabir was appointed as the university's first Vice-Chancellor on 1 November 2021.

The University of Gwadar signed a cooperation agreement with Jiangsu University in China in 2022.

== Undergraduate degree programs ==
The university currently has two faculties; the Faculty of Management Sciences, Commerce and Social Sciences, and the Faculty of Sciences, Engineering and Technology. It offers dozens of associate, bachelor's, and master's degree programs, with more master's programs to be introduced soon.

- BS Commerce
- BS Economics
- B.Ed (hons)
- B.Ed (2.5 Years)
- B.Ed (1.5 Years)
- BS English
- Bachelor of Business Administration
- BS Chemistry
- BS Information Technology
- BS Data Science
- BS Zoology
- BS History
- BS Archaeology
- Doctor of Pharmacy (5 Years)

=== Associate Degree Programs (2 Years) ===
- AD in Commerce
- AD in Economics
- AD in Education
- AD in Business Administration
- AD in Chemistry
- AD in Computer Science
- AD in Zoology
- AD in History
- AD in Archaeology
