= Gwadar Cricket Stadium =

Cricket ground in Gwadar, Pakistan

Coordinates: 25.111115693772103°N 62.32275404246348°E

- Interactive map of Gwadar Cricket Stadium
- Location: Gwadar, Balochistan, Pakistan
- Country: Pakistan
- Establishment: 2021; 5 years ago
- Capacity: N/A
- Owner: Pakistan Cricket Board
- Operator: Balochistan Cricket Association; Pakistan Cricket Board
- Tenants: Pakistan national cricket team (planned); Quetta Gladiators (planned)

Gwadar Cricket Stadium, officially known as Senator Muhammad Ishaq Baloch Cricket Stadium, is a cricket ground in Gwadar, Pakistan. Construction started in 1998, and the first match was played in 2021. Currently the stadium only holds domestic games in local competitions. Nearby limestone hills and cliffs tower over the western side of the ground.
