= Learjet 31 =

Business jet aircraft

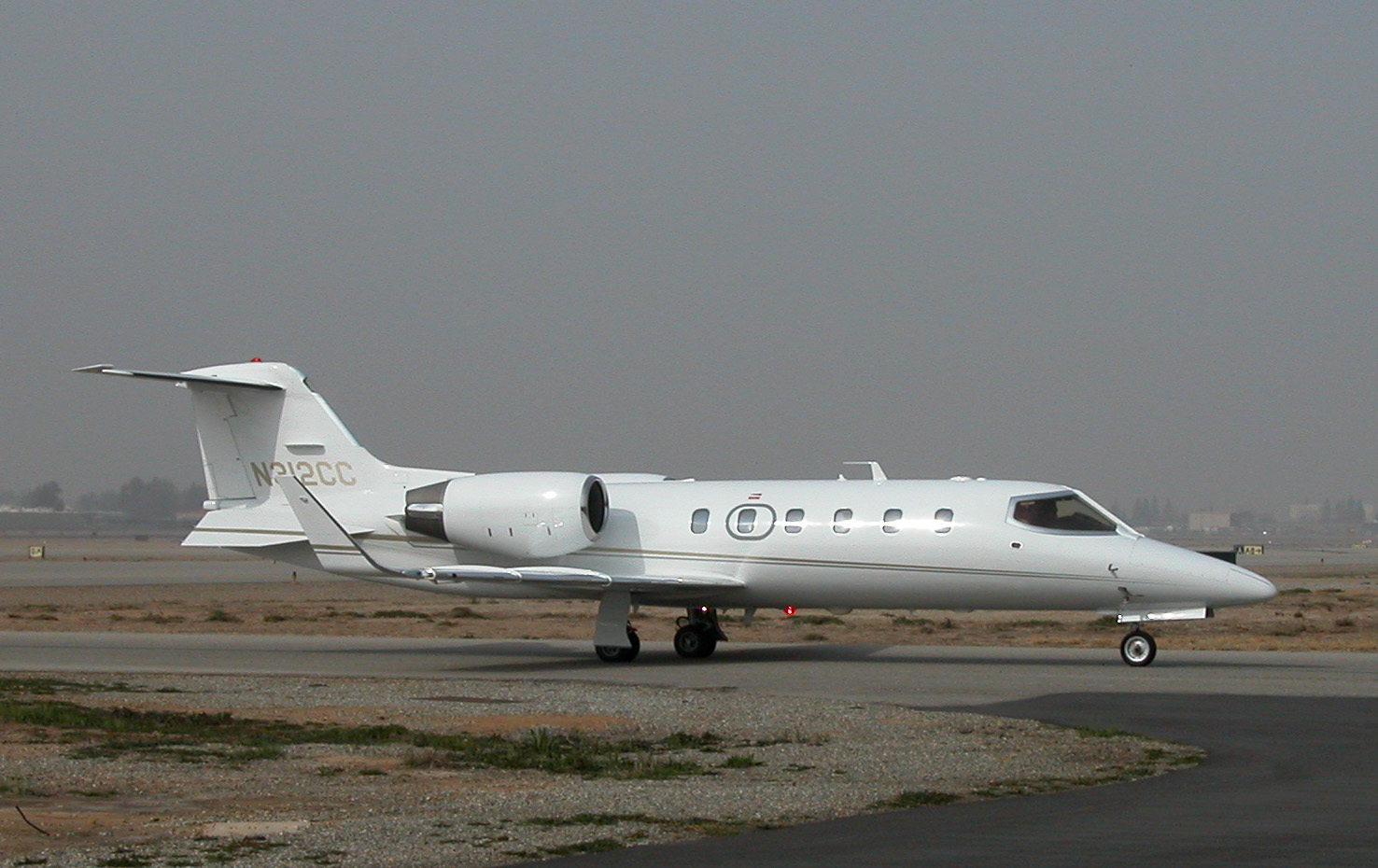
- Learjet 31A

General information
- Type: Business jet
- Manufacturer: Learjet
- Status: Active
- Primary users: Private NASA
- Number built: 246

History
- Manufactured: 1987-2003
- Introduction date: October 1990
- First flight: May 11, 1987
- Developed from: Learjet 29

The Learjet 31 is an American built twin-engined, high speed business jet. Manufactured by Learjet, a subsidiary of Bombardier Aerospace, as the successor to the Learjet 29, it has a capacity of eight passengers and two crew.

== Design and development ==
The first flight of the LJ31 took place on 11 May 1987. The Learjet 31A variant was introduced in October 1990. This version featured increased cruising speed, a digital avionics system with EFIS supplied by AlliedSignal (today Honeywell) and an instrument panel layout change. The nose gear wheel is steered by a Steer by Wire system. The windshield could be heated electrically.

The Learjet 31ER with increased range was produced.

The first 31A serial number 31A-035 entered service 15 August 1991. The 200th 31A was delivered in October 2000. The last 31A delivered, serial number 31A-242 was delivered on 1 October 2003.

By 2018, late 1990s to early 2000s Learjet 31As begin at $600,000.

== Variants ==
=== Learjet 31 ===
The Learjet Model 31 is, arguably, the ultimate realization of the original Learjet series dating back to the Model 23 of 1963. Essentially combining the fuselage and engines of the model 35/36 with the “Longhorn” wing of the 28, 29 and 55 models, results in performance which is equaled by few aircraft. Normal cruise altitudes range from 41,000 to 47,000 feet (12,500-14,900 m) and the aircraft's maximum cruise altitude of 51,000 feet (15,500 m) is a distinction shared by only a handful of civil aircraft. Improvements over earlier models, such as “Delta-Fins” and a “Ski-Locker” increased the utility and improved the performance of the model 31. The addition of Delta-Fins at the bottom of the empennage simplified the certification process of the aircraft by eliminating the need for a “stick pusher” stall avoidance device. Increased directional stability, as a result of the Delta-Fins, was also a welcome benefit. However, a small cabin with little baggage space and no galley, and relatively short range because the Learjet 35/36's tip tanks were eliminated in favor of the winglet-equipped Longhorn airfoil, led to only 38 Learjet 31s being built.

=== Learjet 31A ===
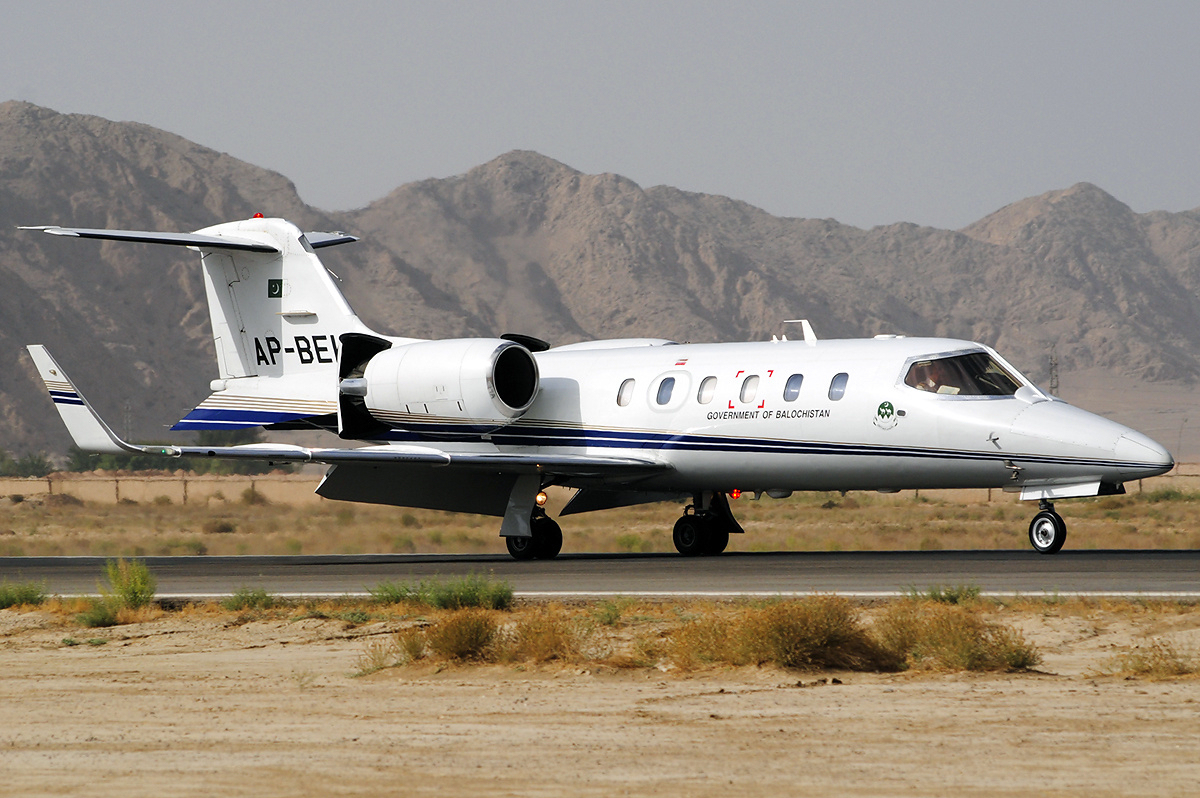
A Learjet 31A jet belonging to the Government of Balochistan, Pakistan

The Learjet 31A was announced in 1990 as a replacement. The model 31A boasted numerous modifications, however the most notable changes were on the flight deck. Key modifications and updates to the model 31A cockpit and avionics include a Bendix King (now Honeywell after the merger with Allied Signal) Electronic Flight Information System 50, with Universal 1M, 1B and 1C flight management system; a dual KFC 3100 two-axis autopilot and flight director with yaw damper; and dual Bendix King (Radios sold to Chelton Avionics when Allied Signal combined with Honeywell) VCS-40A com units, VN-411B Series III navigation receivers.

In the year 2000 the Learjet 31A was again revised. Takeoff and landing weights were increased. The original design N_{2} digital electronic engine control (DEEC) was replaced with an N_{1} DEEC, and the thrust reversers became standard equipment. Another notable improvement is Honeywell's TFE731-2 to -2C engine upgrade. The original R12 freon air conditioning system was replaced with an R134A system divided into two zones - cockpit and cabin.

=== Learjet 31A/ER ===
The extended range version of the Learjet 31A, has a range of 1911 nm (2199 miles or 3539 km). Overall the numerous enhancements have led to more than 200 Learjet 31s in service with private operators and governments worldwide.

== Operators ==
Pakistan

- Government of Balochistan, Pakistan (former)
- Government of Azad Kashmir

United States

- NASA

Indonesia

- Ministry of Transportation

== Specifications (Learjet 31) ==
side view

Data from Jane's All The World's Aircraft 1988–89

General characteristics

- Crew: 2
- Capacity: 8 passengers
- Length: 48 ft 8 in (14.83 m)
- Wingspan: 43 ft 10 in (13.36 m)
- Height: 12 ft 3 in (3.73 m)
- Wing area: 264.5 sq ft (24.57 m^{2})
- Empty weight: 9,857 lb (4,471 kg)
- Gross weight: 15,500 lb (7,031 kg)
- Powerplant: 2 × Garrett TFE731-2 turbofan, 3,500 lbf (15.6 kN) thrust each

Performance

- Maximum speed: Mach 0.81
- Cruise speed: 515 mph (829 km/h, 448 kn)
- Stall speed: 97 mph (156 km/h, 84 kn)
- Range: 1,877 mi (3,021 km, 1,631 nmi) (Standard fuel, four passengers,)
- Service ceiling: 51,000 ft (16,000 m)
- Rate of climb: 5,480 ft/min (27.8 m/s)
