= University of Turbat =

University in Balochistan, Pakistan

University of Turbat تربت ءِ دانشگاہ د تربت پوهنتون جامعہ تربت دانشگاه تربت
- Motto: Tradition, Innovation, Excellence
- Type: Public university
- Established: 2012; 14 years ago
- Affiliations: Higher Education Commission (Pakistan); Pakistan Bar Council
- Chancellor: Governor of Balochistan
- Vice-Chancellor: Prof. Dr. Gul Hasan
- Students: 3400
- Location: Turbat-92600, Balochistan, Pakistan
- Campus: 1
- Nickname: UOT
- Website: uot.edu.pk

The University of Turbat (UOT; Balochi: تربت ءِ دانشگاہ Pashto: د تربت پوهنتون Urdu: جامعہ تربت ) is a public university situated in Turbat, Balochistan, Pakistan.

University of Turbat is the second General University in public sector, chartered by the Government of Balochistan by Act 2012 passed by the Provincial Assembly of Balochistan in May, 2012. The main objective of the establishment of the University of Turbat in the Mekran region in Balochistan is to provide better opportunities of higher education to the students of Turbat (Kech) and adjoining districts of Panjgur, Gwadar and Awaran.

With the establishment of the University of Turbat, substantial number of students will be enrolled initially from different parts of province mainly from Mekran will have a direct effect on the social environment of the families of the students and indirectly to the society. With the introduction of market valued subjects, about 500 job opportunities annually would be created directly benefiting the social wellbeing of a segment of the population in the region. The first vice chancellor of the university was Prof. Dr. Abdul Razzaq Sabir (TI).

== Recognized university ==
This university is recognized by the Higher Education Commission of Pakistan.

== Campuses ==
- University of Turbat, Kech
- University of Turbat, Gwadar campus (From 2017 to 2021; later became University of Gwadar)
- University of Turbat, Panjgur Campus (Till 2024; later became University of Makran)

== Degree programs ==
- 1. L.L.B. (5 year)
- 2. L.L.B. (3 year)
- 3. B.S.C.S
- 4. M.C.S.
- 5. B.S. Commerce
- 6. M.Com.
- 7. B.B.A.
- 8. M.S. Management Sciences
- 9. B.S. chemistry
- 10. B.S. Biochemistry
- 11. BS Biotechnology
- 12. M.Phil. Chemistry
- 13. B.S. Balochi
- 14. M.Phil. Balochi
- 15. M.A. Balochi
- 16. B.S. Economics
- 17. M.A. Economics
- 18. M.Sc. Chemistry
- 19. M.B.A.
- 20. M.A. English
- 21. B.S. English
- 22. M.A. Political Sciences
- 23. B.S. Political Sciences
- 24. B.Ed. (Elementary)
- 25. M.Ed.
- 26. B.Ed. (2 year after B.A.)
- 27. B.S. Botany

== Number of students ==
- 3400

== Departments ==
- 1. Department of Law
- 2. Department of Computer Sciences
- 3. Department of Management Sciences
- 4. Department of Commerce
- 5. Department of Economics
- 6. Department of English
- 7. Department of Balochi
- 8. Department of Political Sciences
- 9. Department of Chemistry
- 10. Department of Bio- Chemistry
- 11. Department of Bio Technology
- 12. Department of Botany
- 13. Department of Education
- 14. Department of Sociology
- 15. Department of History

== See also ==
List of universities in Pakistan
