= List of territory purchased by a sovereign nation from another sovereign nation =

This is a list of purchases of territory by a sovereign nation from another sovereign nation. It includes transfers of sovereignty by agreement in which money was paid for the territory, as stated in the agreement or in reliable sources. It excludes leases and payments that an agreement assigns to other purposes, such as war damages or the settlement of claims. Prices are given as stated at the time, without adjustment for inflation.

Territory	Purchased by	Purchased from	Cost	Year	Area	Cost/Area	Agreement (article)
Isle of Man, Hebrides, Kintyre and islands of the Firth of Clyde	Scotland	Norway	4,000 marks sterling, 100 mark annuity	1266	~8,000 km²	~0.5 marks sterling/km²	Treaty of Perth
Avignon	Papal States	(Kingdom of Naples) Joanna I of Naples (as Countess of Provence)	80,000 gold florins	1348			
Dunkirk and Fort-Mardyck	France	England	5,000,000 livres	1662	~44 km²	~113,500 livres/km²	Sale of Dunkirk
Estonia, Livonia, Ingria, and Southeast Finland (Kexholmslän and part of Karelian Isthmus)	Russia	Sweden	2,000,000 silver Swedish riksdaler	1721	~100,000 km²	~2,000 Riksdaler/km²	Treaty of Nystad
Saint Croix	Denmark–Norway	France	750,000 livres	1733	210 km²	3571 livres/km²	
Louisiana	United States	France	$15,000,000 USD	1803	2,140,000 km²	7 USD/km²	Louisiana Purchase
Florida	United States	Spain	$5,000,000 USD	1819	~200,000 km²	~25 USD/km²	Adams–Onís Treaty
Singapore	United Kingdom	Johor	$60,000 Spanish dollars	1824	728 km²	~82 Spanish dollars/km²	Crawfurd Treaty
Tranquebar, Serampore, and other continental holdings of Danish India	United Kingdom	Denmark	125,000 GBP or 1,125,000 Danish krone	1845	~44 km²	~2840 GBP/km² or ~25,600 Kr/km²	
California, Nevada, Utah, Arizona	United States	Mexico	$18,250,000 USD	1848	1,360,000 km²	13.4 USD/km²	Treaty of Guadalupe Hidalgo
Danish Gold Coast	United Kingdom	Denmark	10,000 GBP	1850	~12,000 km²	~1.2 GBP/km²	
Southern Arizona and New Mexico	United States	Mexico	$10,000,000 USD	1853	76,800 km²	130 USD/km²	Gadsden Purchase
Saxe-Lauenburg	Prussia	Austria	2,500,000 Danish rigsdaler	1865	1,000 km²	2,500 Rigsdaler/km²	Gastein Convention
Alaska	United States	Russia	$7,200,000 USD	1867	1,717,856 km²	4 USD/km²	Alaska Purchase
Dutch Gold Coast	United Kingdom	Netherlands	46,939.62 Dutch guilders	1872			Anglo-Dutch Treaties of 1870–1871
Saint Barthélemy	France	Sweden	320,000 French francs	1878	21 km²	15,238 Francs/km²	
Philippines	United States	Spain	$20,000,000 USD	1898	300,000 km²	20 USD/km²	Treaty of Paris
Caroline Islands	Germany	Spain	25,000,000 ESP	1899	1,160 km²	21,551 ESP/km²	German–Spanish Treaty
Palau	Germany	Spain	25,000,000 ESP	1899	1,160 km²	21,551 ESP/km²	German–Spanish Treaty
Mariana Islands	Germany	Spain	25,000,000 ESP	1899	1,160 km²	21,551 ESP/km²	German–Spanish Treaty
Cagayan Sulu and Sibutu	United States	Spain	$100,000 USD	1900	467 km²	214 USD/km²	Treaty of Washington
Acre (state)	Brazil	Bolivia	£2,000,000	1903	142,800 km²	14 GBP/km²	Treaty of Petrópolis
Benadir ports	Italy	Zanzibar	£144,000	1905			
Territory north of Lugh to Dolo	Italy	Ethiopia	£120,000	1908			
Danish West Indies	United States	Denmark	$25,000,000 USD	1916	400 km²	62,500 USD/km²	Treaty of the Danish West Indies
Jäniskoski-Niskakoski territory	Soviet Union	Finland	700,000,000 FIM	1947	176 km²	700 FIM/km²	
Gwadar	Pakistan	Muscat and Oman	£3,000,000	1958			Gwadar Purchase
