= Gwadar Purchase =

1958 Acquisition of Gwadar by Pakistan

Omani Overseas Territory of Gwadar Omani Gwadar گوادر (Urdu)
- Former subdivision of Oman
- 1783–1958
- Flag Coat of arms

Anthem
- Salute to the Sultan
- Capital: Gwadar
- History
  - Granted to Sultan bin Ahmad: 1783
  - Sultan bin Ahmad becomes Sultan of Oman: 1792
  - Purchase and acquisition by Pakistan: 1958
| Preceded by | Succeeded by |
| Khanate of Kalat | Pakistan |

The Gwadar Purchase (Urdu: گوادر کا حصول, lit. 'Acquisition of Gwadar') was the acquisition of the territory of Gwadar by Pakistan from Muscat and Oman in 1958. Pakistan was able to acquire 15,210 square kilometres (5,870 sq mi) of land on the coast of Balochistan for around 5.5 billion Pakistani rupees (or 1.15 billion US dollars as of 1958), paid mostly by Aga Khan IV.

The deal was made with the efforts of Prime Minister of Pakistan Feroz Khan Noon and Said bin Taimur, the Sultan of Muscat and Oman, and Pakistan was able to purchase the land on 8 September 1958, and it officially became a part of Pakistan on 8 December 1958.

The local life in Omani Gwadar was mainly around fishing, trade, and agriculture, with the Baluchi tribes forming the primary community, living in a mix of traditional mud-brick homes, and relying on the sea for their livelihood, while also engaging in regional commerce that connected them to Oman, India, and East Africa.

== Background ==
In the year 1783, the Khan of Kalat, Nasir Khan I Ahmadzai, granted Gwadar to Sultan bin Ahmad, the vanquished leader of Muscat, who was entrusted with its governance on behalf of the Khan. Despite his eventual recovery of power in Muscat, the Omani administration continued to hold sway over Gwadar through the appointment of local governors. This resulted in a dispute between the Sultan's descendants and the Khan of Kalat regarding the governance of Gwadar, which led to British involvement in the matter.

Having secured concessions from the Sultan for the utilization of the region, the British assisted Muscat in maintaining control over Gwadar. Eventually, they brought telegraph lines to the town.

Between 1863 and 1879, Gwadar served as the center of operations for a British Assistant Political Agent. The town was visited fortnightly by steamers belonging to the British India Steamship Navigation Company and featured a joint Post and Telegraph Office.

At the time of Pakistan's independence in 1947, Gwadar remained under Omani authority. Nevertheless, Pakistan started to indicate interest in Gwadar after it acquired control of various Baloch territories, including the Chief Commissioner's Province of British Baluchistan, as well as the states of Kharan, Makran, Lasbela and Kalat. Over the months following independence, Pakistan absorbed these regions into its territory.

In 1954, Pakistan enlisted the services of the United States Geological Survey (USGS) to conduct a survey of its coastline. Based on the survey's findings, Gwadar was deemed a viable location for the development of a new deep-water port.

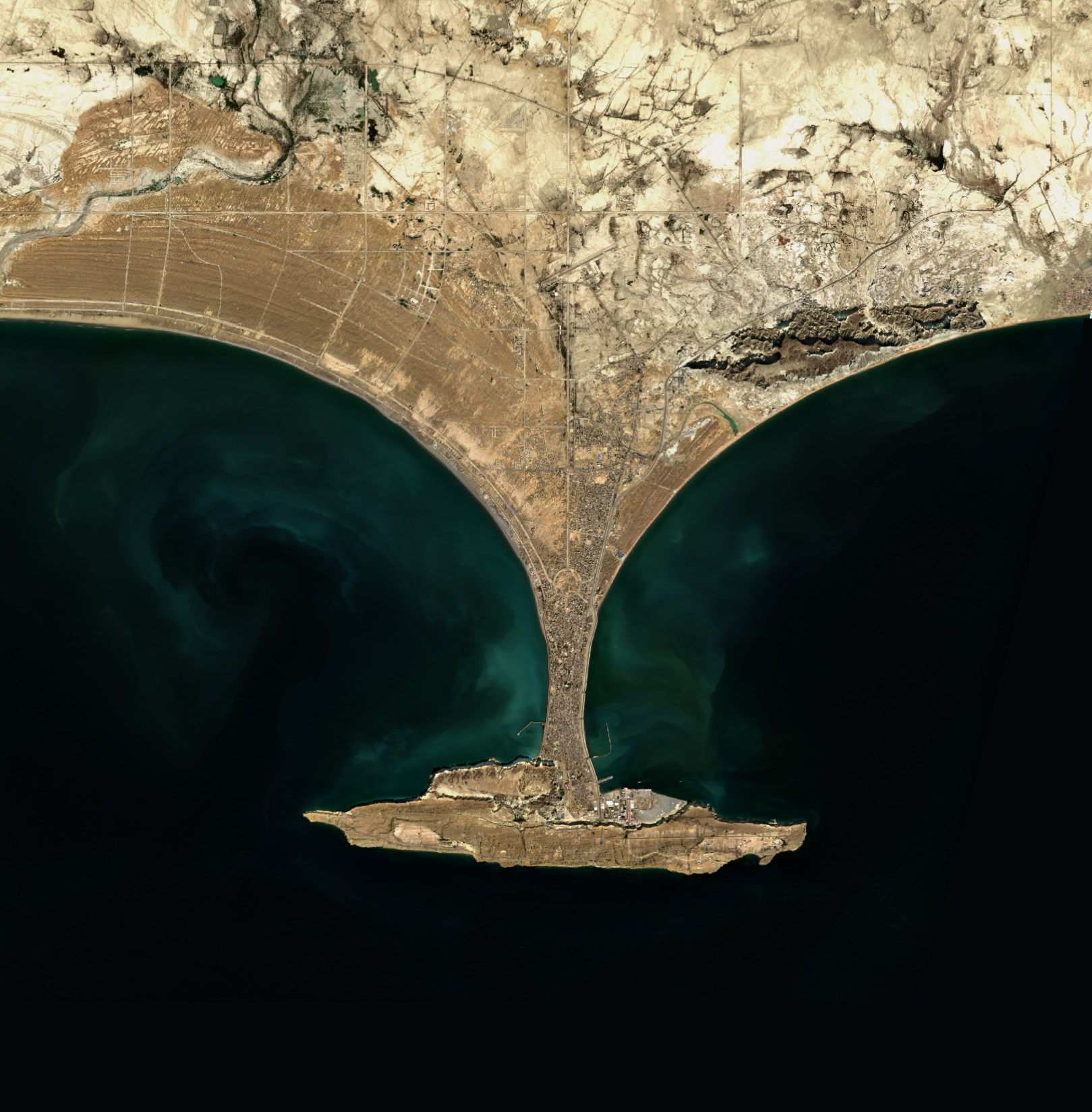
Satellite view of Gwadar

== Negotiations ==
Worth Condrick, the USGS surveyor, ascertained that Gwadar was an appropriate site for a deep-sea port due to its unique hammerhead-shaped peninsula. Upon receiving this information and with the backing of the local inhabitants, the Pakistani government made a formal request to the Sultan of Oman and Muscat to permit Gwadar to join Pakistan. The two countries negotiated over this matter for a period of four years.

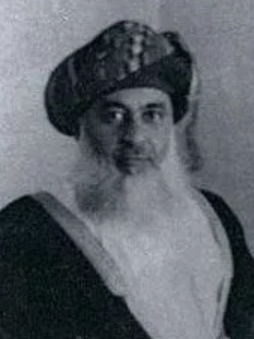
Said bin Taimur (Last Omani Sultan of Gwadar)

Following Pakistan's expression of interest in acquiring Gwadar, the country also requested the aid of the UK government in arranging a trade agreement between Oman and Pakistan. Nevertheless, the UK initially discouraged this proposal and only became involved in the negotiations in 1958. Ultimately, the UK helped to facilitate the talks between the two parties. Prime Minister of Pakistan Feroz Khan Noon and his wife Viqar-un-Nisa Noon entered negotiations with the Sultan of Oman, Said bin Taimur in 1958. During this time, the Sultan of Oman agreed to hand Gwadar over to Pakistan for Rs. 5.5 billion, which was paid to by the 49th Imam of Nizari Ismailis, Aga Khan IV.

As per the agreement, in the event that oil was discovered in Gwadar in commercially viable amounts, the Pakistani government would have to pay a percentage of the total revenue to the Sultan. The deal also included provisions for the residents of Gwadar to retain their Omani citizenship without jeopardizing their rights as Pakistani citizens, the recruitment of Gwadar residents into the Sultan's Armed Forces, the opportunity for military personnel to receive training in Pakistani technical schools, the extradition of deserters to Oman, and the unrestricted export of rice to Oman at regular trade rates.

== Acquisition by Pakistan ==
On 7 September 1958, Prime Minister of Pakistan Feroz Khan Noon announced the following on Radio Pakistan:

"The Government of Pakistan has issued a communiqué stating that the administration of the Port of Gwadar and its hinterland, which had been in the possession of His Highness the Sultan of Muscat and Oman since 1784, was today taken over by Pakistan with full sovereign rights. The people of Gwadar have joined the people of Pakistan and the whole of Gwadar and the Islamic Republic of Pakistan. I know that the people all over Pakistan, including those residing in Gwadar, have received this announcement with feelings of great joy. I welcome the residents of Gwadar into the Pakistani union and I would like to assure them that they will enjoy equal rights and privileges along with all other Pakistan nationals irrespective of considerations of religion, caste or creed. They will have their full share in the glory and prosperity of the Republic to which they now belong. The residents of Gwadar, most of who are members of the brave Balochi community, have close racial and cultural links with the people of Pakistan and joining the Republic of Pakistan represents the natural culmination of their political aspirations. I should like to take this opportunity to thank, on behalf of the people and Government of Pakistan, Her Majesty’s Government in the United Kingdom for their assistance and help in bringing to a successful conclusion our negotiations with His Highness the Sultan of Muscat and Oman for the transfer of his rights in Gwadar."

== Life In Omani Gwadar ==
From the late 18th century until 1958, Gwadar was under the control of the Omani Sultanate, which had extended its influence over the region, recognizing its strategic importance as a coastal port. During this time, Gwadar was not a part of Oman’s mainland but a distant coastal possession, with the Sultan of Oman maintaining sovereignty over it. The region’s national status was that of an overseas outpost of the Omani Empire, and it served as an important center for maritime trade, particularly between Oman, the Indian subcontinent, and East Africa.

Life in Gwadar during this period was centered around its role as a port town. The region was inhabited by a mix of Baluchi, Kashmiri, Pashtun (Rohillia Pashtuns) and Sindhi settlers, with economic activities revolving around fishing, trade, and maritime commerce. The population was relatively small, with much of the local life revolving around the port, which served as a hub for the export of fish, dates, and pearls, as well as the import of goods from India, Persia, and beyond. Trade was not only the economic lifeblood of the region but also a vital link between the Arabian Peninsula, South Asia, and the wider world. The city attracted many Baluch tribes from nearby with large minority's of Kashmiris who settled for trade and to escape discrimination from nomadic lifestyles like the Kanjar who also brought the Kashmiri turban which became popular in Oman through Gwadar in the late 1700's. The city also attracted a large amount of Rohillia Pashtuns from Uttar Pradesh during the British occupation who settled throughout the city staying there on the way to Hajj ended up mainly working as soldiers for the Sultan. Today, all these groups are seen as native and have a unique culture and speak Urdu and Baluchi. Today the city is a diverse mix of all groups and everyone shares a common religion, culture and history despite their different origins.

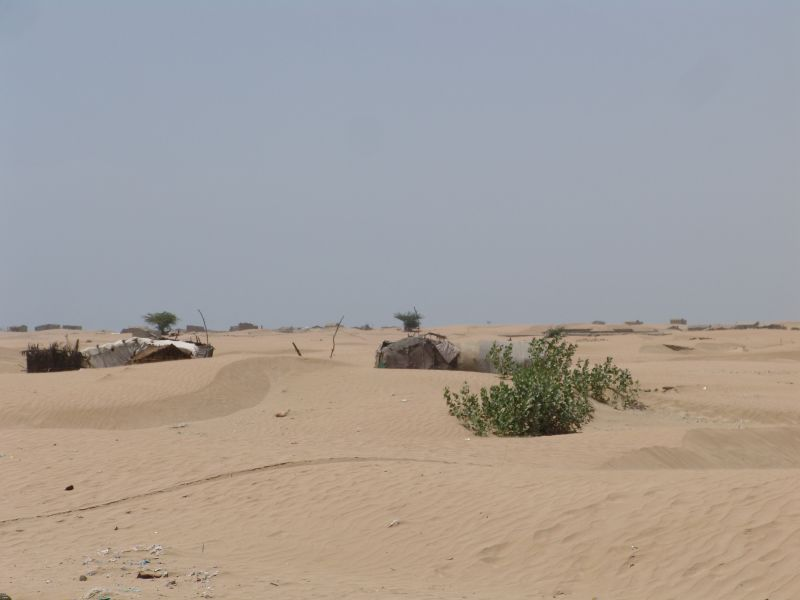
Gwadar's arid desert

The Omani administration in Gwadar functioned through a strategically decentralized system, in which the Sultan of Oman delegated full regional authority to a locally appointed governor—the Wali. As the Sultan’s direct representative, the Wali wielded extensive powers, acting as the supreme administrator, military commander, and judicial authority in the region. He controlled the enforcement of law and order, commanded local security forces, supervised tax collection, and regulated all trade and economic activity. In effect, the Wali governed Gwadar with near-autonomous power, serving as the absolute embodiment of Omani rule on the Makran coast.

While the Sultan in Oman held ultimate authority, the local Wali enjoyed a degree of autonomy in managing local affairs, particularly those related to trade and dealing with the surrounding Baluch tribes.

The main two Wali of Gwadar were Saif Bin Ali (First) and Eshan Azim also written as (Ehsan) (Last) from 1783–1958.

Saif Bin Ali, the first Wali, was appointed shortly after the territory was granted to the Sultan of Oman in 1783 by the Khan of Kalat. His role marked the beginning of formal Omani administrative presence in the region. As Wali, he was responsible for establishing order, managing trade, and maintaining Omani authority in Gwadar, which served as a strategic port and commercial hub on the Arabian Sea.

Eshan Azim (Also written as Ehsan Azim), the last Wali, presided over Gwadar during a time of increasing geopolitical interest in the region. His tenure ended when Oman formally transferred control of Gwadar to Pakistan on September 8, 1958, following negotiations and a financial settlement brokered with the support of the British government. Azim's departure marked the end of Omani governance and the beginning of Gwadar’s integration into Pakistan as part of the Balochistan province. Azim was also the first local native Wali of Gwadar.

Oman’s governance was marked by its Islamic and tribal structures, where the Sultan wielded supreme political power, but the social and legal systems were largely influenced by Sharia law and tribal customs. Relationships with the local Baluchi tribes were often crucial for maintaining stability. Oman’s influence in the region was maintained through a mix of diplomacy, military presence, and occasional alliances with local tribal leaders.

Many people in Gwadar today still hold on to their old Omani passports from the past which after 1970 became Pakistani nationals.

== See also ==
- List of territory purchased by a sovereign nation from another sovereign nation
