= Nur Hayat Noon =

Pakistani industrialist and politician

Malik Nur Hayat Khan Noon (1927–1996) was a Pakistani industrialist and politician who served as a member of the National Assembly of Pakistan from 1962 to 1964 and again in 1977. He served as Minister for Culture, Archaeology, Sports and Tourism in 1977 during Bhutto ministry. He also served as a Federal Minister for Communications and later Minister for Health for another term in 1985. He founded Noon Pakistan with his brother Manzoor Hayat Noon.

His father, Feroz Khan Noon, served as a prime minister of Pakistan. Noon did not marry, and he died in 1996.
