= Balochistan Forests & Wildlife Department =

Department in Balochistan, Pakistan

- ادارہ جنگلات و حیانہ بلوچستان

Provincial Department overview
- Jurisdiction: Balochistan, Pakistan
- Provincial Department executive: Provincial Secretary Forest and Wildlife, Head
- Parent department: Ministry of Forests and Wildlife
- Website: bfwd.gob.pk

The Balochistan Forests & Wildlife Department is a government agency in Pakistan that oversees the conservation and management of forests, national parks, wildlife sanctuaries, and game reserves within the province of Balochistan.

== Background ==
The department has been in existence for over 100 years. It was originally established during British Colonial Rule and later operated under the West Pakistan Forest Service. In the 1970s, it became a separate provincial department.

== Structure ==
The department falls under the jurisdiction of the Ministry of Forests and Wildlife and is led by a Provincial Secretary Forest and Wildlife. It is divided into several divisions, each headed by a Conservator of Forests. These divisions include Khuzdar Division, Nasirabad Division, Turbat Division, Loralai Division, Sibi Division, and Civil Division Quetta.
