= Firoz Khan Noon =

Prime Minister of Pakistan from 1957 to 1958

Sir Firoz Khan Noon KCSI KCIE OStJ
- فیروز خاں نون
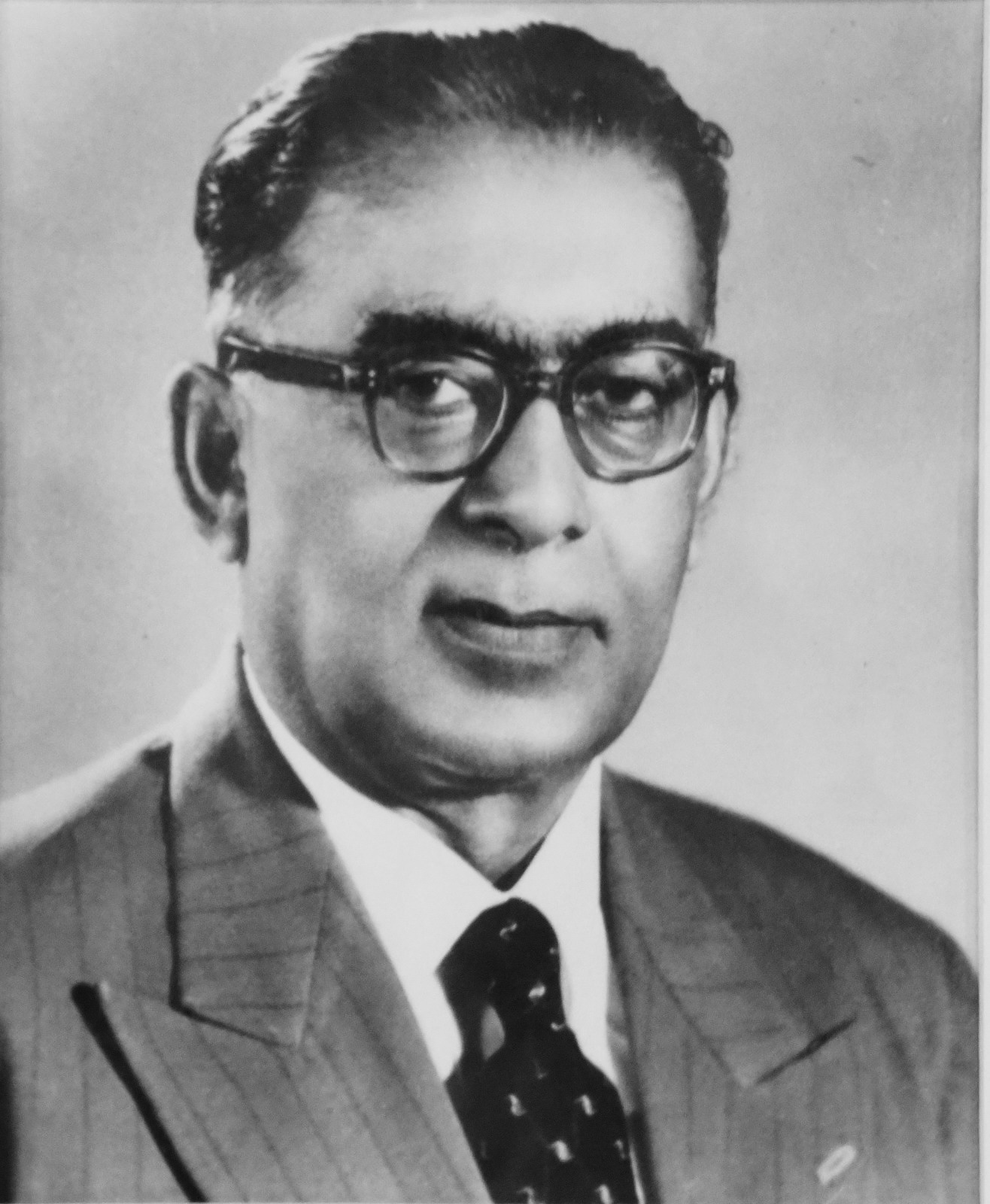

7th Prime Minister of Pakistan
- In office 16 December 1957 – 7 October 1958
- President: Iskander Mirza
- Preceded by: Ibrahim Ismail Chundrigar
- Succeeded by: Ayub Khan (as chief martial law administrator); Nurul Amin (1971)

Minister of Defence
- In office 16 December 1957 – 7 October 1958
- Preceded by: Mumtaz Daultana
- Succeeded by: Muhammad Ayub Khuhro

Minister of Foreign Affairs
- In office 12 September 1956 – 7 October 1958
- Prime Minister: Huseyn Shaheed Suhrawardy
- Preceded by: Hamidul Huq Choudhury
- Succeeded by: Manzur Qadir

Chief Minister of Punjab
- In office 3 April 1953 – 21 May 1955
- Governor: Mian Aminuddin; Habib Ibrahim Rahimtoola; Mushtaq Ahmed Gurmani
- Preceded by: Mumtaz Daultana
- Succeeded by: Abdul Hamid Khan Dasti

Governor of East Bengal
- In office 31 March 1950 – 31 March 1953
- Chief Minister: Nurul Amin
- Preceded by: Frederick Chalmers Bourne
- Succeeded by: Chaudhry Khaliquzzaman

Permanent Representative of India to the United Nations
- In office 1945–1946
- Preceded by: Position established
- Succeeded by: Samar Sen

Minister of Defence in Viceroy's Executive Council
- In office 1942–1945
- Governors General: The Marquess of Linlithgow; Archibald Wavell

Minister of Labour in Viceroy's Executive Council
- In office 1941–1942
- Governor General: The Marquess of Linlithgow
- Succeeded by: B. R. Ambedkar

High Commissioner of India to the United Kingdom
- In office 1936–1941
- Preceded by: Bhupendra Nath Mitra
- Succeeded by: Azizul Haque

Provincial Minister of Punjab for Education
- In office 1931–1936
- Governor: Malcolm Hailey; Geoffrey Fitzhervey de Montmorency; Herbert William Emerson; Sikandar Hayat Khan

Provincial Minister of Punjab for Local Government
- In office 1927–1931
- Governor: Malcolm Hailey; Geoffrey Fitzhervey de Montmorency
- Preceded by: Fazl-i-Hussain

Member of Punjab Legislative Council
- In office 1921–1936

President of Republican Party
- In office 1957–1958

Personal details
- Born: 7 May 1893 Hamoka, Punjab, British India
- Died: 9 December 1970 (aged 77) Nurpur Noon, Punjab, Pakistan
- Party: Republican Party (1955–1958)
- Other political affiliations: Muslim League (1947–1955); All-India Muslim League (1945–1947); Unionist Party (1921–1945)
- Spouse: Viqar un Nisa Noon
- Children: Nur Hayat Noon (son); Manzoor Hayat Noon (son)
- Education: University of Oxford

Sir Malik Firoz Khan Noon (Note: Urdu: ملک فیروز خاں نون) (7 May 1893 – 9 December 1970) KCSI KCIE OStJ was a Pakistani politician who served as the seventh prime minister of Pakistan from December 1957 until being ousted in October 1958 when president Iskandar Ali Mirza imposed martial law and appointed Ayub Khan as the chief martial law administrator. (Note: Twenty days later, on 27 October 1958, Ayub Khan overthrew president Iskandar Ali Mirza in the 1958 Pakistani military coup and assumed the role of president as well.) He also served as the third chief minister of West Punjab from 1953 to 1955.

Trained as a barrister in England, Noon served as High Commissioner of India to the United Kingdom before serving as a military adviser, over issues pertaining to the British Indian Army, to Prime Minister Winston Churchill's war ministry from the India Office.

Noon was one of the Founding Fathers of Pakistan who helped to negotiate and establish the Federation of Pakistan as a nation-state on 14 August 1947, resulting from the successful constitutional movement led by Muhammad Ali Jinnah.

== Early life and education ==
Firoz Khan Noon was born in the village of Hamoka, located in Khushab District, Punjab in the then British India on 7 May 1893 into a Punjabi family. He came from an aristocratic landowning family from the Rajput tribe that was known for their wealth and reputation in social circles. The family traces its roots back to a Rajput prince named Raja Ganj and has provided political elite and military officials from the times of Ranjit Singh, Noon's ancestors having served in Ranjit Singh's army. His father Nawab Malik Sir Muhammad Hayat Khan Noon was a nominated member of the Council of State from 1935 to 1937 while his cousin Malik Sardar Khan Noon was a politician as well.

After his initial schooling, Noon attended Aitchison College in Lahore before being sent to England in 1912. The India Office arranged for him to stay with the family of a Reverend Lloyd in Ticknall, South Derbyshire. From there he applied to study at Oxford University, initially being rejected by Balliol College, he was then accepted by Wadham College. Noon stayed with Lloyd's family until 1913, and had a close relationship with them until going to Oxford.

Noon graduated from Wadham College with a Bachelor of Arts (BA) degree in history in 1916. He was a keen soccer player and played collegiate field hockey for Isis Club.

He interacted with very few Indian students while at university, heeding his father's advice to learn English culture, and lacked time to attend any Indian cultural festivals because he was concentrating on his studies. His sojourn in Britain left in him a lifelong admiration for Britain and during his career within the Pakistani state, he was always known to be an Anglophile.

After graduation, Noon moved to London to sit the law examination. He qualified as a barrister-at-law from the Inner Temple in 1917 before returning to India.

== Law practice and public service in Punjab ==
Noon returned to India in September 1917, and in January 1918 began practising law at the District Court in Sargodha. He later moved to the Lahore High Court, establishing his reputation in civil law until 1927.

In 1920–21, Noon entered national politics and was elected to the Punjab Legislative Assembly on the platform of the Unionist Party. During this time, he formed a close acquaintance with Jogendra Singh. From 1927 until 1931, he joined the cabinet of the Governor of Punjab, Malcolm Hailey and held the portfolio of provincial Ministry of Local Government until 1930.

Between 1931 and 1936, Noon was in the cabinets of Governors Geoffrey Fitzhervey de Montmorency, Sir Sikandar Hyat, and Herbert William Emerson where he held provincial portfolios of Ministries of Health and Education.

In December 1932, Noon was appointed as an Officer of the Venerable Order of Saint John. In 1933, Noon was knighted in the 1933 New Year Honours List. He was appointed as Knight Commander of the Order of the Indian Empire (KCIE) in the 1937 Coronation Honours List and appointed as Knight Commander of the Order of the Star of India (KCSI) in October 1941.

== Diplomatic career and political activism in British India ==
In 1936, Noon resigned from his public service in Punjab when he was appointed as the High Commissioner of India to the United Kingdom.

Over the issue of the Immigration Act of 1924 in the United States, the British Government directed Noon to Washington D.C. He was accompanied by Nevile Butler of the Foreign and Commonwealth Office in 1941 to address issues of American exploration in Baluchistan, and the Most Favoured Nation (MFN) status between the United States and the United Kingdom, in light of the Anglo-American Trade Agreement signed in 1938. Noon showed great reluctance to grant American petroleum companies access to Baluchistan due to the Indian government's difficulty maintaining control in remote areas adjacent to Iran and Afghanistan, especially when Indians were being barred from entering the United States.

After the start of World War II in 1939, Noon, who had pro-British views, supported British efforts against the Axis powers, lobbying for deployment of the British Indian Army in Africa and the Middle East. In 1940, he strongly supported Egyptian plans to establish the grand mosque in London. During the height of the anti-British Quit India Movement in India, Noon played a crucial role by convincing Prime Minister Winston Churchill of the support of Indian Muslims for continued British rule there.

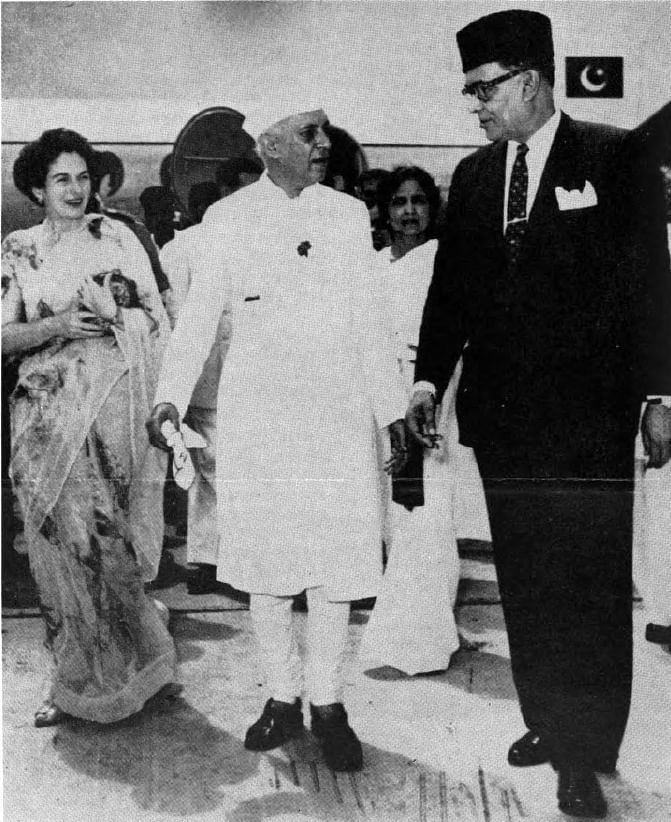
Firoz Khan Noon with Indian Prime Minister Jawaharlal Nehru, 1958

Noon joined the Viceroy's Executive Council. In early 1942, he forecast communal unrest if Britain abandoned India's Muslims by turning power over to the Congress Party.

In 1944–45, Churchill appointed Noon to the War Department, leading his own department alongside Sir Arcot Ramasamy Mudaliar that provided representation for British India in the Pacific War Council. In 1945, he was appointed as Permanent Representative of India to the United Nations, attending the first UN session in San Francisco, California.

By late 1945, it became clear that the new Labour government in Britain intended to transfer power and leave India. The impending loss of their British allies weakened the Unionist Party, and Noon joined others in defecting to the Muslim League. His departure was an important one, and encouraged more members to switch parties. The bolstered Muslim League won the 1945-46 Indian general election by a landslide in the Punjab.

== Governorship of East Bengal and Chief Minister of Punjab ==
In 1947, Noon retained his constituency and became a Member of the National Assembly of Pakistan (MNA) of the Constituent Assembly of Pakistan, following the establishment of Pakistan as a result of the Partition of India.

In October 1947, Jinnah, now Governor-General of Pakistan, appointed Noon as a special envoy and dispatched him to Saudi Arabia and the Islamic world to introduce Pakistan and explain the reasons for its creation, to familiarize the Muslim countries with its internal problems, and to get moral and financial support from the brother countries. Noon performed the role assigned to him in a successful manner.

In 1950, Prime Minister Liaquat Ali Khan removed Noon from the Foreign Ministry, appointing him as the Governor of East Bengal. However, he was less interested in the politics of East Bengal and focused towards the provincial politics of Punjab in Pakistan, contesting with Mumtaz Daultana for the post of Chief Minister. He had little interest in strengthening the political program of the Muslim League in Bengal and offered no political action when the popular Bengali language movement took place in 1950–51. On 25 July 1952, he returned to Punjab in Pakistan and left the post to Abdur Rahman Siddiqui, returning to his post on 10 November 1952. Noon left Dhaka to become the Chief Minister of Punjab on 26 March 1953.

After the 1953 Anti Ahmadiyya riots in Lahore that resulted in Daultana's resignation, Noon was appointed Chief Minister of Punjab.

== Role in the Republican party ==
In 1955, Noon parted from the Muslim League when he helped to establish the Republican Party, supporting the cause of the One Unit programme that laid establishment of West and East wings of Pakistan. He took over the presidency of the Republican Party, and joined the coalition of the three-party government composed of, the Awami League, the Muslim League, and the Republican Party that endorsed Iskander Mirza for the presidency. Noon had been ideologically very close to Mirza and was appointed in the coalition cabinet of Prime Minister Huseyn Suhrawardy.

== Premiership (1957–1958) ==
After the resignations of the Awami League's Huseyn Suhrawardy and the Muslim League's I. I. Chundrigar, Noon was the last candidate from the three-party coalition government to become Prime Minister.

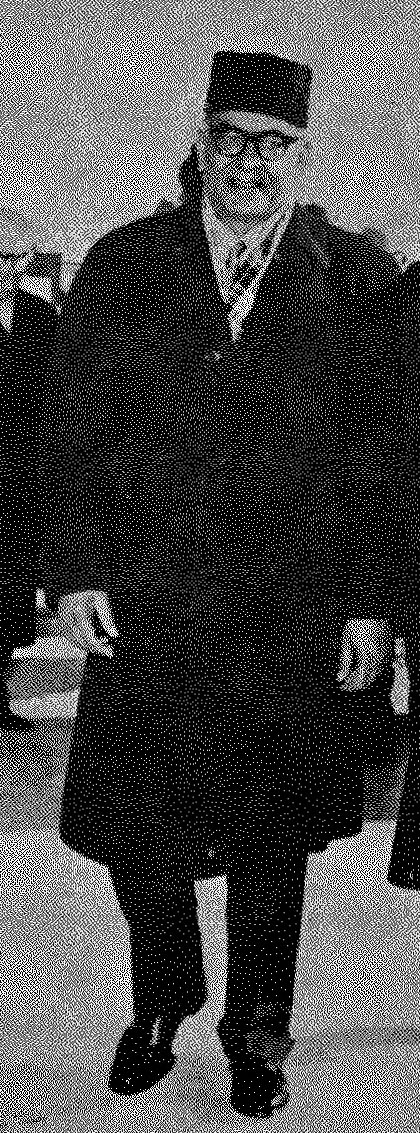
Malik Firoz Khan in London, 1958

=== Negotiation for Gwadar ===
On 16 December 1957, Noon took an oath from Chief Justice M. Munir and formed a coalition government. During this time, Noon entered into complicated but successful negotiations with the Sultanate of Muscat and Oman for the cession of Gwadar, which was taken into the Federation of Pakistan on 8 September 1958, for the price of US$3 million.

Noon's ability to get Gwadar into the Federation, and settlement of political issues in the country generally, threatened President Mirza who saw him as an obstacle to Mirza obtaining absolute power. Noon tried to obtain a compromise with India regarding the Kashmir problem.

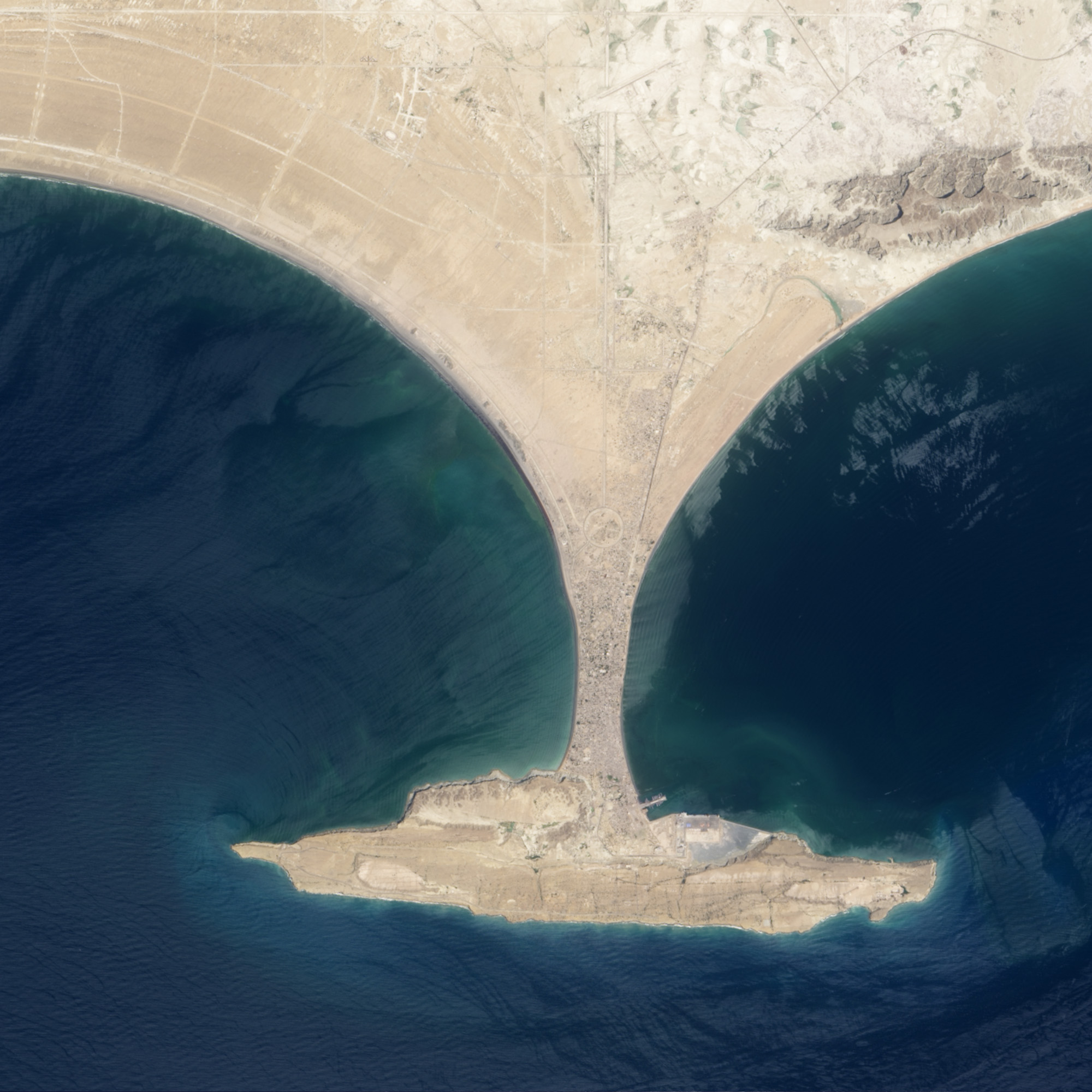
A Satellite image of the Modern port of Gwadar, once in the hands of Muscat & Oman, now in the hands of Pakistan due to Firoz Khan Noon.

In his memoirs, From Memory, Noon writes, "With Gwadar in foreign hands, I had felt we were living in a house in which the back room with another door, was occupied by a stranger who could, at any time, sell us out to a power inimical to Pakistan...". The wife of Firoz Khan Noon, Viqar-un-Nisa Noon, also played a large role in the accession of Gwadar to Pakistan. She visited London in 1956 to see the British Prime Minister Winston Churchill, and to lobby the British Parliament for their protectorate of Muscat and Oman to give custody of 'Gwadar Port' to Pakistan, and get approval from the House of Lords.

Noon had not endorsed the presidential re-election of Mirza as the three-party coalition had been negotiating their own president to replace Mirza in 1958. At midnight on 7/8 October 1958, Mirza imposed martial law in a coup d'état against his own party's government, effectively dismissing his own appointed Prime Minister to usurp all political power into his own hands.

== Later and personal life, and death ==
After the 1958 Pakistani coup d'état, Noon retired from national politics and became a political writer. He authored five books on the history of India and issues pertaining to law and politics in Pakistan.

Noon was married twice. He had five children from his first wife. In 1944, he married Viqar-un-Nisa Noon, an Austrian-born social worker. He died on 7 December 1970 in his ancestral village of Nurpur Noon, Sargodha District, where he is buried.

== Books ==
- Wisdom From Fools (1940), short stories for children.
- Scented Dust (1941), a novel.
- India (1941)
- Kashmir (1957)
- From Memory (1966), autobiography.

== See also ==
- Politics of Pakistan
- India in World War II

== Notes ==
Political offices
Preceded by Frederick Chalmers Bourne	Governor of East Bengal; 1950–1953	Succeeded by Chaudhry Khaliquzzaman
Preceded by Mumtaz Daultana	Chief Minister of Punjab; 1953–1955	Succeeded by Abdul Hamid Khan Dasti
Preceded by Hamidul Huq Choudhury	Minister of Foreign Affairs; 1956–1958	Succeeded by Manzur Qadir
Preceded by Ibrahim Ismail Chundrigar	Prime Minister of Pakistan; 1957–1958	Succeeded by Nurul Amin
Preceded by Mumtaz Daultana	Minister of Defence; 1957–1958	Succeeded by Muhammad Ayub Khuhro
