= Gwadar =

Port city in Balochistan, Pakistan

Gwadar گوادر
- Port city
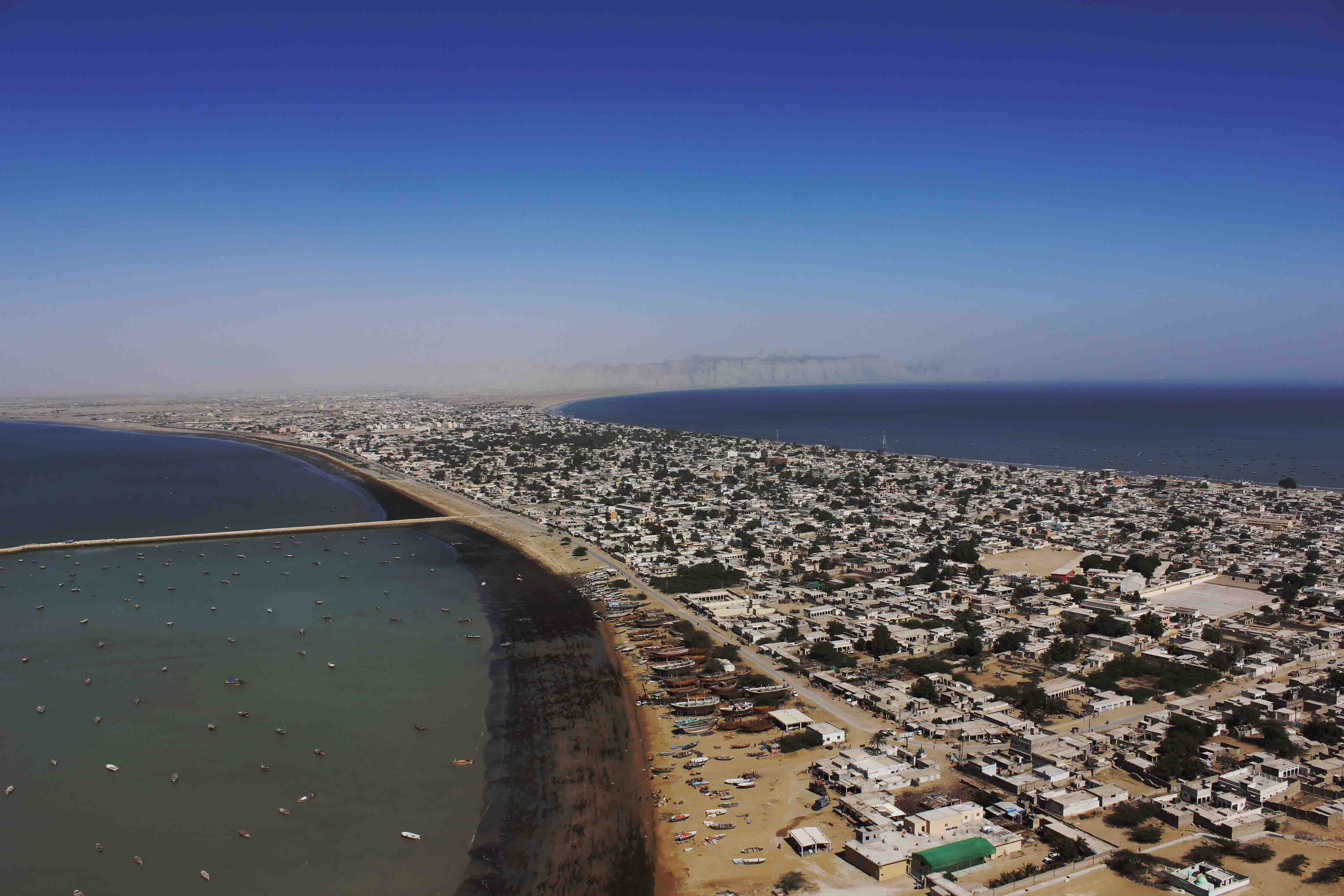
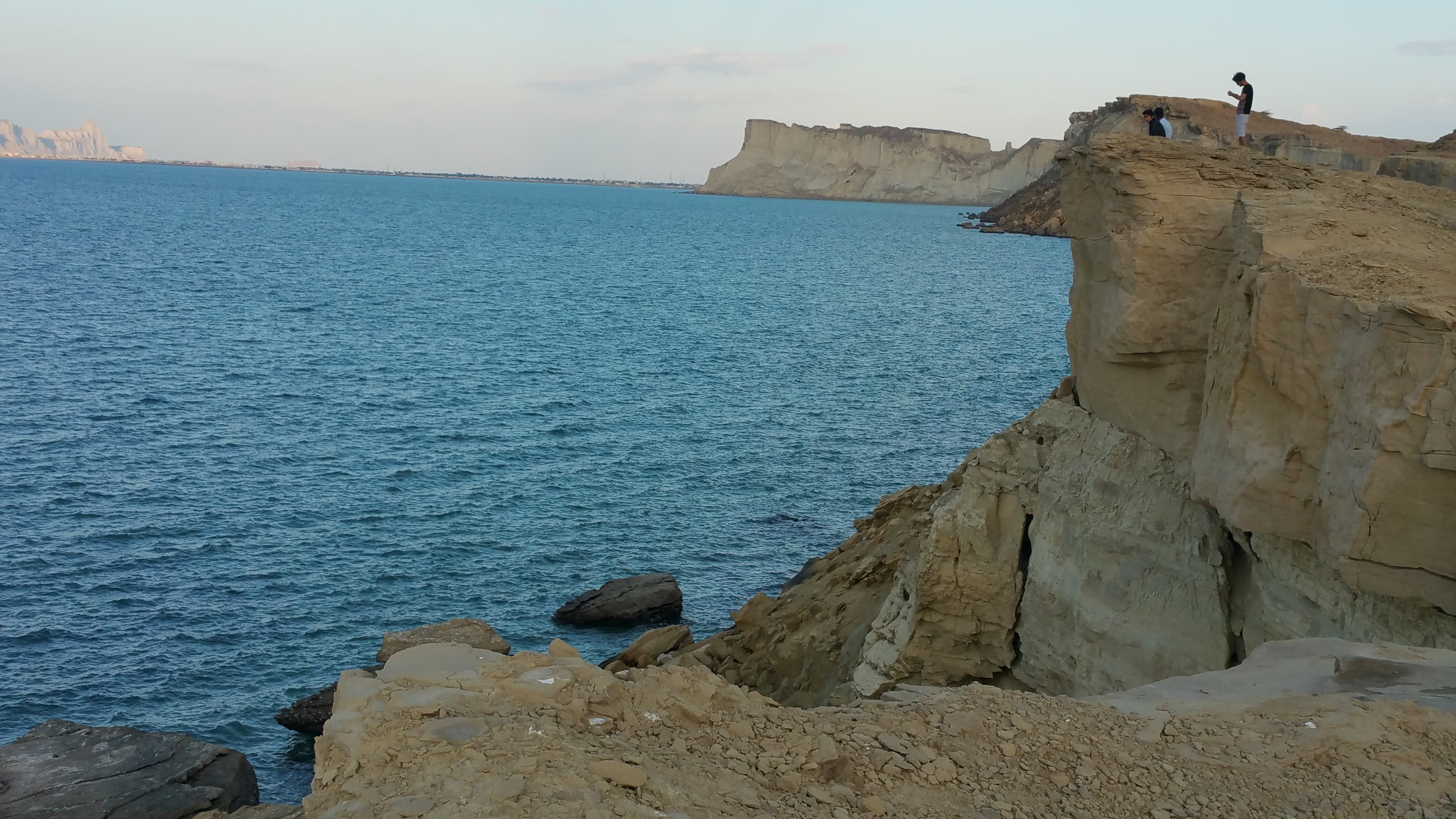
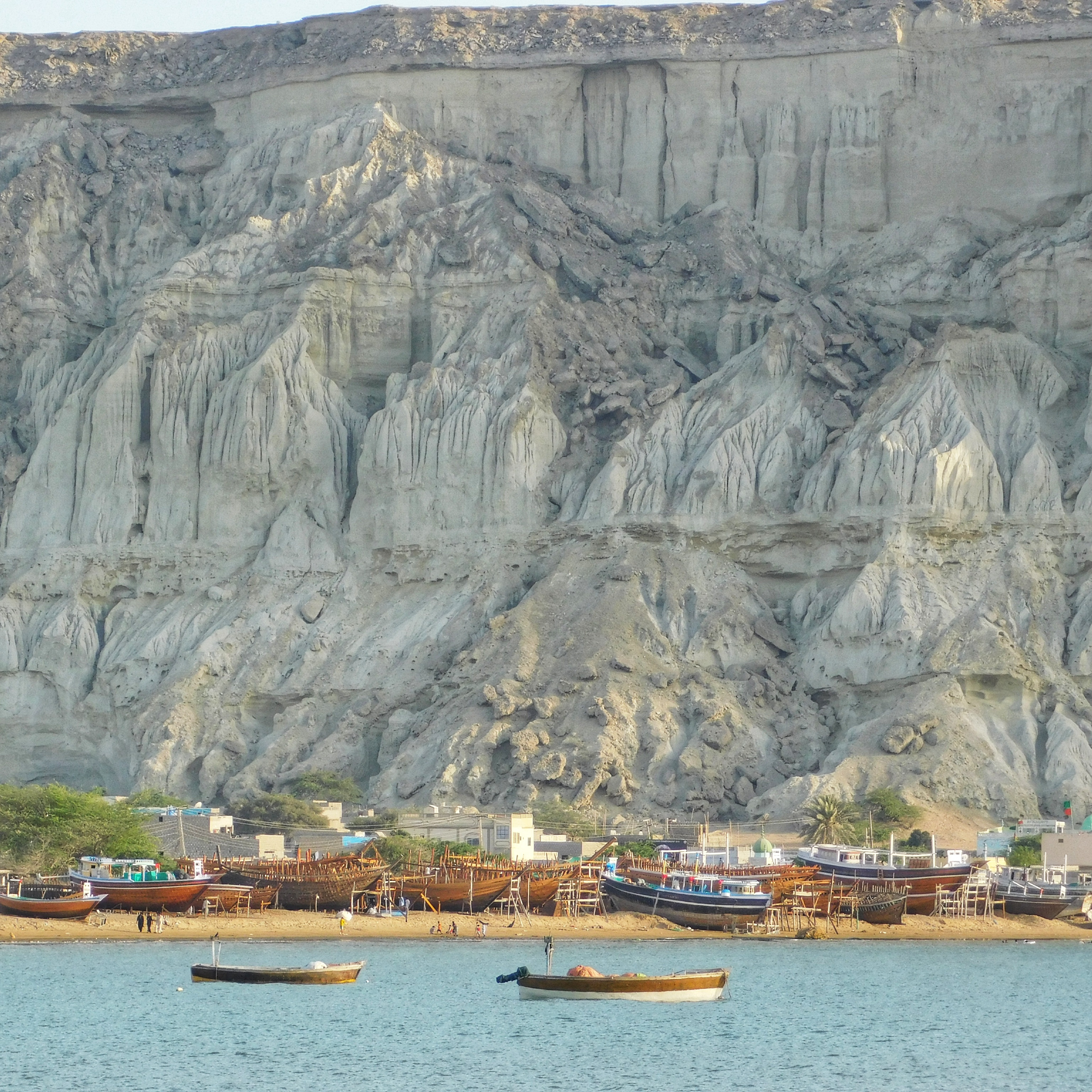
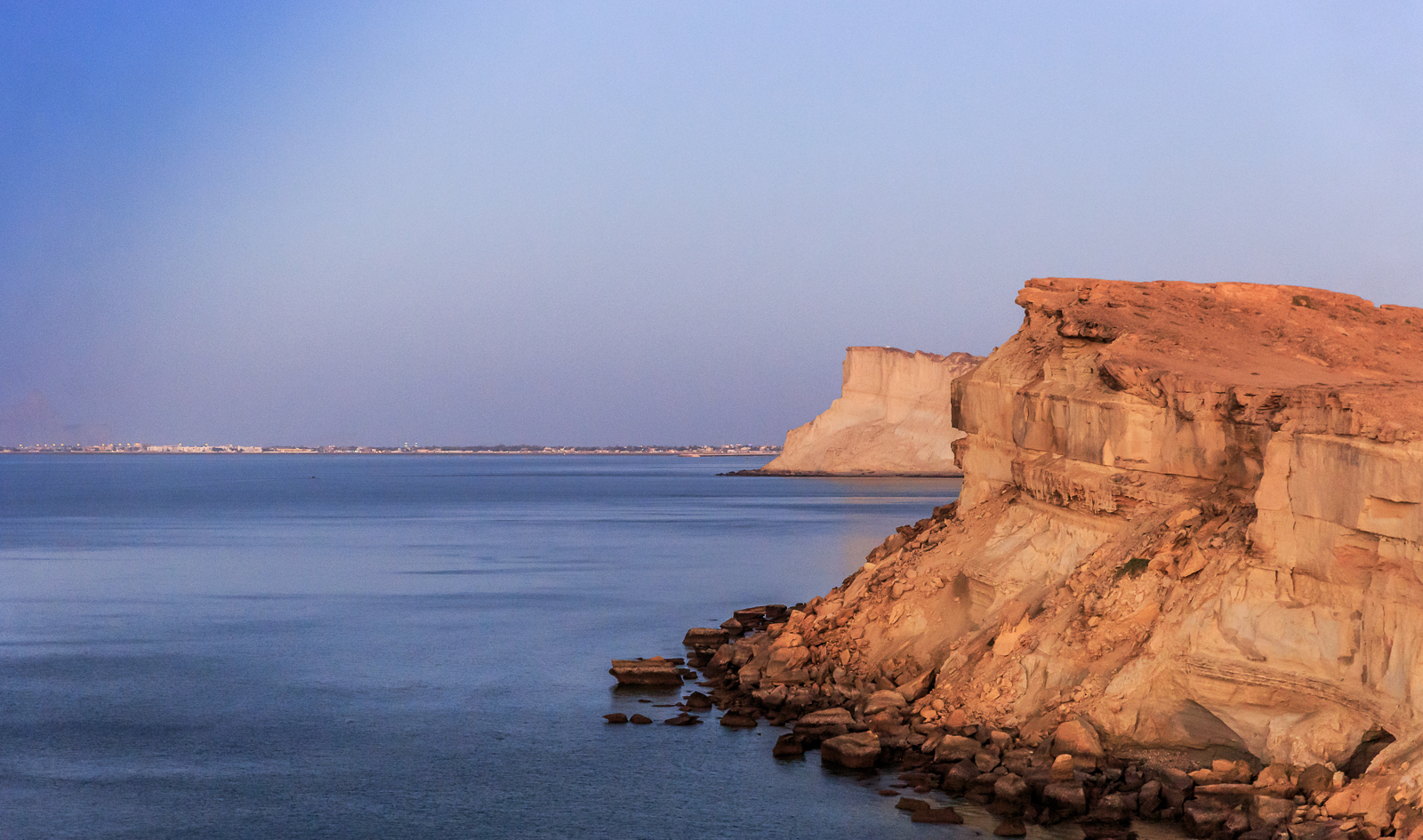
- From top, left to right: Gwadar coastline, Blue Lagoon at Gwadar, Gwadar Fishing Basin, Gwadar Sangar Flagpole, Gwadar Port, Gwadar Bay
- Interactive map of Gwadar
- Gwadar Gwadar (Pakistan) Gwadar (West and Central Asia) Gwadar (South Asia) Gwadar (Asia)
- Coordinates: 25°07′35″N 62°19′21″E
- Country: Pakistan
- Province: Balochistan
- District: Gwadar
- Tehsil: Gwadar

Government
  - Type: Municipal Corporation
  - Body: Gwadar Development Authority
  - Mayor: Muhammad Sharif Miah Dad
  - Deputy Commissioner: Hamood-Ur-Rehman (BPS-18 PAS)
  - District Police Officer: Zuhaib Mohsin (BPS-18 PSP)

Population (2023)
  - Total: 70,852
- Time zone: UTC+5 (PST)
- Postal code: 91200
- Calling code: +92
- Number of towns: 1
- Number of Union councils: 5
- HDI (2024): 0.606 (medium)
- Website: www.gda.gov.pk

Gwadar (Urdu: گوادر, Urdu pronunciation: [ɡəʋɑːd̪əɾ]) is a port city on the southwestern coast of the Pakistani province of Balochistan. It is on the shores of the Arabian Sea, opposite Oman, and had a population of over 90,000 in the 2017 census. It was an overseas possession of the Sultanate of Muscat and Oman from 1783 to 1958, when it was purchased by Pakistan. It is about 120 km (75 mi) southwest of Turbat. The sister port city of Chabahar in Iran's Sistan and Baluchestan province is about 170 km (110 mi) to the west. In October 2011, Gwadar was declared the winter capital of Balochistan.

Founded in the late 17th century as a fishing settlement, Gwadar became a regional trade hub within the Omani Empire in the 20th century before being ceded to Pakistan (1958). Modest investment from China helped accelerate Gwadar's development from 2013 to 2020 when the city started to develop its economy. In 2025, overall investment reached 1 billion USD.

The main industrial concern is a fish-processing factory.

Gwadar came in the focus of attention after the 1999 Kargil War when Pakistan felt the need of having a military naval port and the Karachi-Gwadar Road (Coastal Highway) was built for defence purposes. For most of its history, Gwadar was a small to medium-sized settlement with an economy largely based on artisanal fishing. The strategic value of its location was first recognized in 1954 when it was identified as a suitable site for a deep-water port by the United States Geological Survey at the request of Pakistan while the territory was still under Omani rule. Until 2001, the area's potential to be a major deep-water port remained untapped under successive Pakistani governments, when construction on the first phase of Gwadar Port was initiated in 2007. The first phase cost $248 million. The port initially remained underutilized after construction for a variety of reasons, including lack of investment, security concerns, and the Government of Pakistan's failure to transfer land as promised to the port operator, Port of Singapore Authority.

In April 2015, Pakistan and China announced their intention to develop the $46 billion China–Pakistan Economic Corridor (CPEC), which in turn forms part of China's One Belt, One Road initiative. Gwadar features heavily in CPEC, and is envisaged to be the link between the One Belt, One Road and Maritime Silk Road project. $1.153 billion worth of infrastructure projects will be invested into the city as part of CPEC, with the aim of linking northern Pakistan and western China to the deep-water seaport. The city will also be the site of a floating liquefied natural gas facility that will be built as part of the larger $2.5 billion Gwadar–Nawabshah segment of the Iran–Pakistan gas pipeline project. Despite concerns over the United States sanctions on Iran, Pakistan is going ahead with the construction of a pipeline from the Iranian border to Gwadar as of 2024. This is partly to avoid contractual penalties and partly to avoid overreliance on the Gwadar Coal–Power Plant which requires imported coal. In addition to investments directly under the aegis of CPEC in Gwadar city, the China Overseas Port Holding Company in June 2016 began construction on the $2 billion Gwadar Special Economic Zone, which is being modelled on the special economic zones of China. In September 2016, the Gwadar Development Authority published a request for tenders for the preparation of expropriation and resettlement of Old Town Gwadar.

== Etymology ==
The word "Gwadar" is a combination of two Balochi words – gwát meaning wind and dar meaning gateway or door (Balochi: گوات ءُ در), (Urdu: گوادر) thus Gwadar means "the gate of wind".

== History ==
=== Ancient ===
The inhabitation of Gwadar, like most of Balochistan, appears to be ancient. The area shows inhabitation as early as the Bronze Age with settlements around some of the area's oasis. It is from this settlement pattern that the word Makran, the original name of Balochistan, is derived. For a period, it was a region of the Achaemenid Persian Empire. It is believed to have been conquered by the founder of the Persian Empire, Cyrus the Great. The capital of the satrapy of Gedrosia was Pura, which is thought to have been located near the modern Bampūr, in Iranian Balochistan. During the homeward march of Alexander the Great, his admiral, Nearchus, led a fleet along the modern-day Makran coast and recorded that the area was dry, mountainous, and inhabited by the "Ichthyophagoi" 'fish-eaters', an ancient Greek rendering of the ancient Persian phrase "Mahi Khorana," which has itself become the modern word "Makran". After the collapse of Alexander's empire the area was ruled by Seleucus Nicator, one of Alexander's generals. The region then came under Mauryan rule around 303 BCE, after Seleucus made peace with Emperor Chandragupta and ceded the territory to the Mauryans.

The descendants of the original inhabitants are known as Med people, They were mentioned in the early Muslim historiography as seafarers; some of them were pirarea as Bawarij in the Indian Ocean from their harbors in Debal, Kutch and Kathiawar, to as far as the mouth of river Tigris and Ceylon. Today they are integrated and speak Baloch and Urdu. They are related to the early Sindhi peoples of Makran such as the Jadgals.

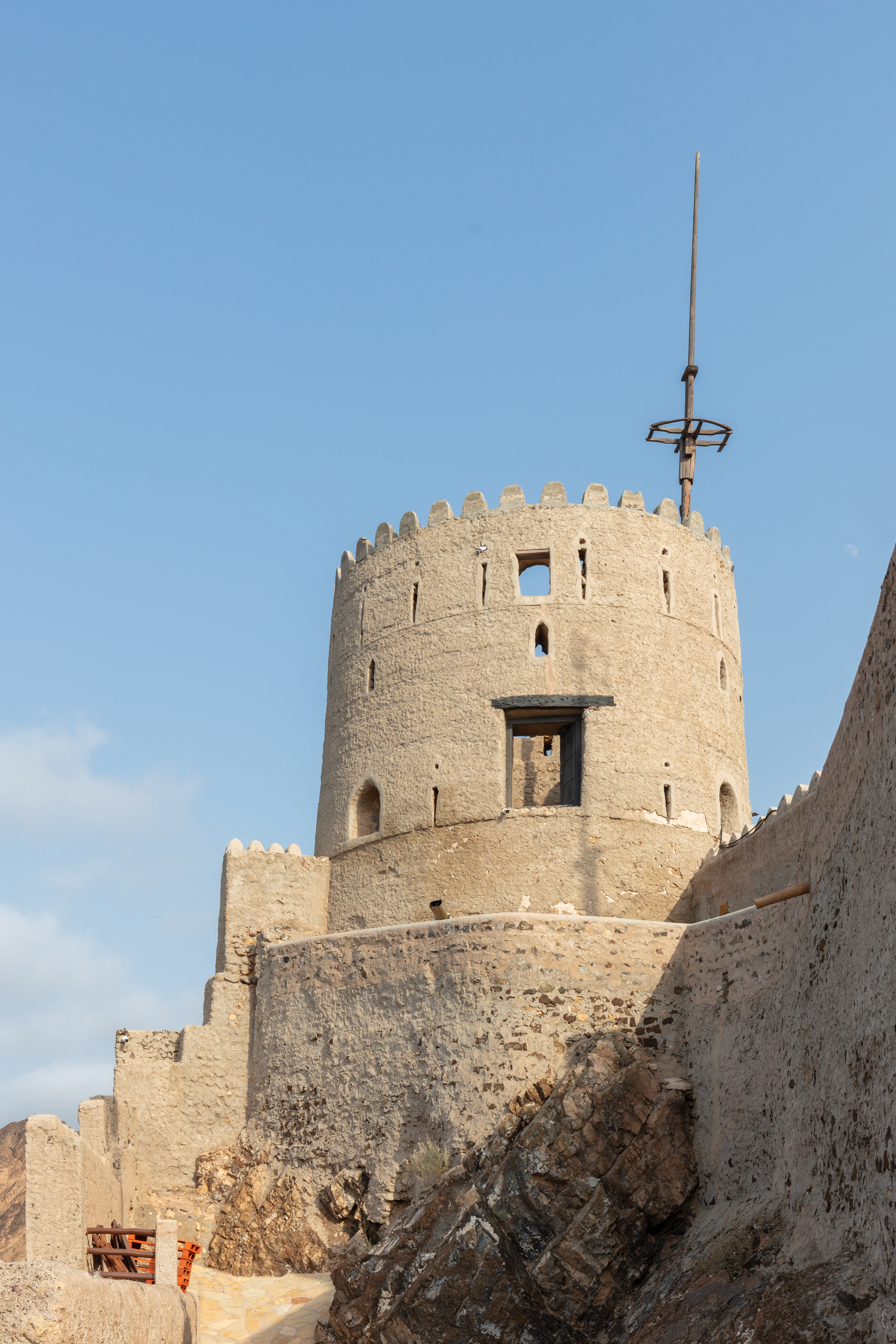
Omani Fort houses found in the old city.

=== Omani rule ===
Following Alexander's march through Gedrosia in 325 BCE, the coastal region of Makran remained largely isolated from major imperial rivalries for nearly a millennium. This quietude ended when the Rashidun Caliphate under Suhail ibn Adi captured Makran in 643 CE (23 AH). Over the next thousand years, control over the region was repeatedly contested by regional powers, including the Ma'danids, Buyids, the Khanate of Kalat, and later the Sultanate of Muscat. This was then followed by almost two centuries of local rule by the various Baloch tribes. The city was visited by Ottoman Admiral Seydi Ali Reis in the 1550s and mentioned in his book Mirat ul Memalik (The Mirror of Countries), 1557. According to Seydi Ali Reis, the inhabitants of Gwadar were Baloch and their chief was Malik Jelaleddin, son of Malik Dinar.

In the 15th century the Portuguese conquered parts of India and Oman. They planned to proceed with annexation of the coastal area of Makran. They attacked Gwadar under the leadership of Vasco da Gama, but under the supervision of Commander Mir Ismaheel Baloch, the Portuguese were defeated by the Baloch. A few times the Portuguese looted and set the coastal villages on fire, but they failed to capture Gwadar. Cannons of the Portuguese army were found lying near the Central Jail of Gwadar. The grave of Mir Ismaheel Baloch is situated near the Mountain of Batal Gwadar, constructed by Mir Ismaheel Baloch himself during life. He died in 1468, heirless.

Towards the end of the 18th century, the Khan of Kalat, Nasir Khan I Ahmadzai, granted suzerainty over Gwadar to Sultan bin Ahmad, the ruler of Muscat. When the sultan subsequently retook Muscat, he was to continue his rule in Gwadar by appointing a wali (or "governor"). This wali was then ordered to subjugate the nearby coastal town of Chabahar (now in Iran). The Gwadar fort was built during Omani rule. In the middle of the 18th century, Nasir Khan captured Gwadar and its surrounding areas after defeating the Gichki Baloch tribe and included it in the Khanate of Kalat. However, realizing that maintaining control of the area will be difficult without the support of the Gichkis, Nasir Khan entered into an agreement with the local Gichki Chief, which allowed the Gichkis to maintain administrative control of the area by establishing their own separate state of Makran, in return for furnishing half the collected revenues to Kalat. This arrangement continued till 1783. When Saiad Sultan fell out with his brother, the ruler of Muscat, and asked for help, Nasir Khan handed over Gwadar, as part of his share of revenues, to Saiad Sultan for his maintenance with the understanding that the area be returned to Kalat, when Saiad Sultan acquires the throne. Saiad Sultan ascended to the throne of Muscat in 1797 but never returned Gwadar enclave to Kalat. The ensuing struggle between the heirs of the Sultan and Khan of Kalat for possession of Gwadar, allowed the British to intervene. Telegraph lines were later extended into the town courtesy of the British. During the Omani rule various groups settled in Gwadar from Sindh such as the Al Lawati which predominantly settled in Oman proper and Muslim Kanjar people who escaped the British to Gwadar to escape persecution for their nomadic lifestyle. The main two Wali of Gwadar were Saif Bin Ali (First) and Ehsan Azim also written as (Last) from 1783–1958.

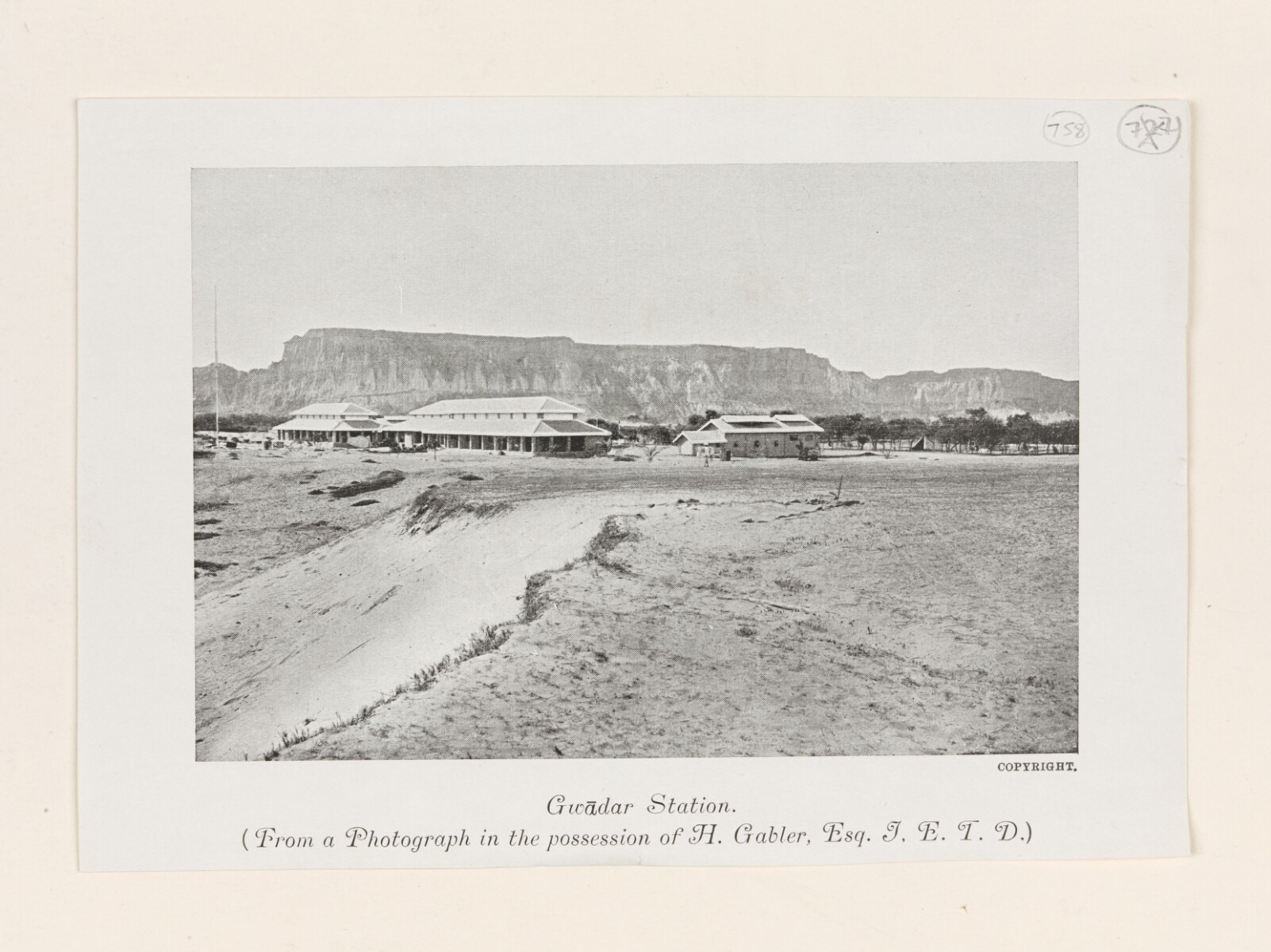
Gwādar Station

The British, after extracting concessions from the Sultan for the use of the area, facilitated Muscat retaining Gwadar. Later on, the British claimed that the area was granted to the Sultan by Mir Nasir, however, local accounts and the declassified documents of that time challenge this claim. From 1863 to 1879, Gwadar was the headquarters of a British Assistant Political Agent. Gwadar was a fortnightly port of call for the British India Steam Navigation Company's steamers and included a combined Post & Telegraph Office.

=== Pakistan ===
In 1947, Makran acceded to the newly created Dominion of Pakistan and was made a district – but Gwadar at that time was not included in Makran. In 1958, the Prime Minister of Pakistan Feroz Khan Noon and his wife Viqar-un-Nisa Noon were able to convince the British Government to hand over Gwadar to Pakistan. On 8 September 1958, Oman finally handed over Gwadar to Pakistan after Prince Karim Aga Khan IV made a contribution of around $3 million USD. It was given the status of a Tehsil of Makran district. On 1 July 1977, Makran District was upgraded into a division and was divided into three districts of Turbat (Kech since 1994–95), Panjgur and Gwadar.

Gwadar underwent major development from 2002 to 2007. In 2002, Pakistan's National Highway Authority (NHA) began construction of the 653 km-long Makran Coastal Highway linking Gwadar with Karachi via Pasni and Ormara and onwards with the rest of the National Highways of Pakistan, which was completed in 2004. In 2003, the Gwadar Development Authority was established to oversee the planning and development of Gwadar and Gwadar Industrial Estate Development Authority was established to promote industrial activities in mega port city of Gwadar. In 2004, NHA began construction of the 820-km long M-8 motorway linking Gwadar with Ratodero in Sindh province via Turbat, Hoshab, Awaran, and Khuzdar and onwards with the rest of the Motorways of Pakistan. In 2006, the Gwadar Development Authority conceived, developed, and adopted a 50-year Master Plan for Gwadar, which was inspired by the Chinese port city of Shenzhen. In 2007, the Civil Aviation Authority of Pakistan acquired 1,700 ha (4,300 acres) to construct a new greenfield airport, the New Gwadar International Airport 2,400 ha (6,000 acres), at an estimated cost of US$246 million. It is expected to be operational by 2025.

On 3 June 2022, Prime Minister Shehbaz Sharif inaugurated the 19.49 km, six-lane Gwadar East Bay Expressway, which was developed as an early harvest project under the China–Pakistan Economic Corridor. The expressway connects the Gwadar Port with the Makran Coastal Highway, thus improving connectivity and helping the transportation of goods towards Karachi. Other developments include 100MW Electricity import from Iran, multiple Housing Schemes, 5-star Hotels, Expo Centre, Desalination Plants on Arabian Sea, Pak-China Friendship Hospital, Aramco Oil Refinery (foreign investment from Saudi Arabia) and an ICC Standard Cricket Stadium.

== Geography ==
=== Topography ===
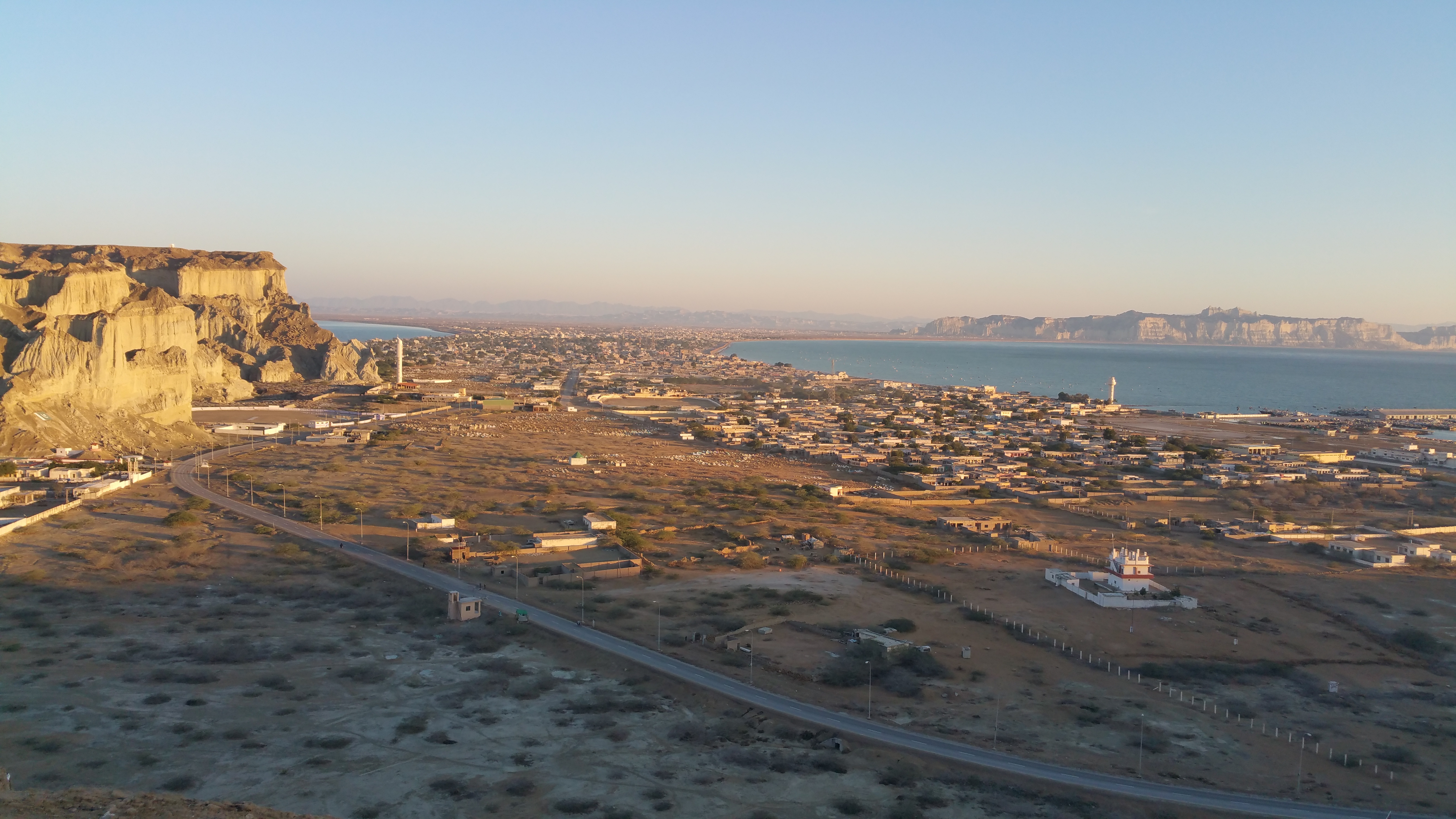
Gwadar is located on a narrow and sandy isthmus which connects the 150 m (480 ft) foot tall Gwadar Promontory to the Makran coastline.

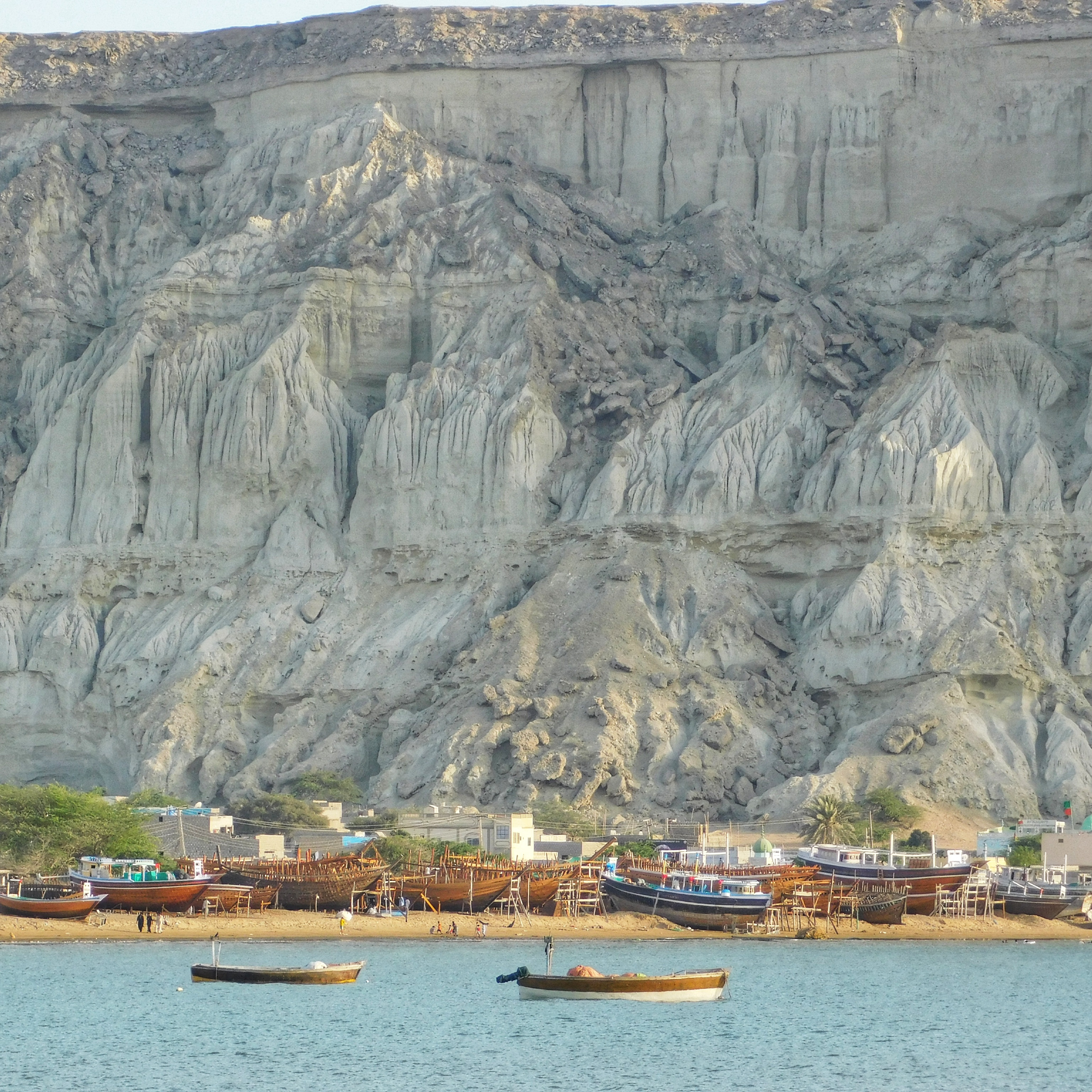
Fishing boats in Gwadar East Bay with the Koh-e-Mehdi Hills in the background

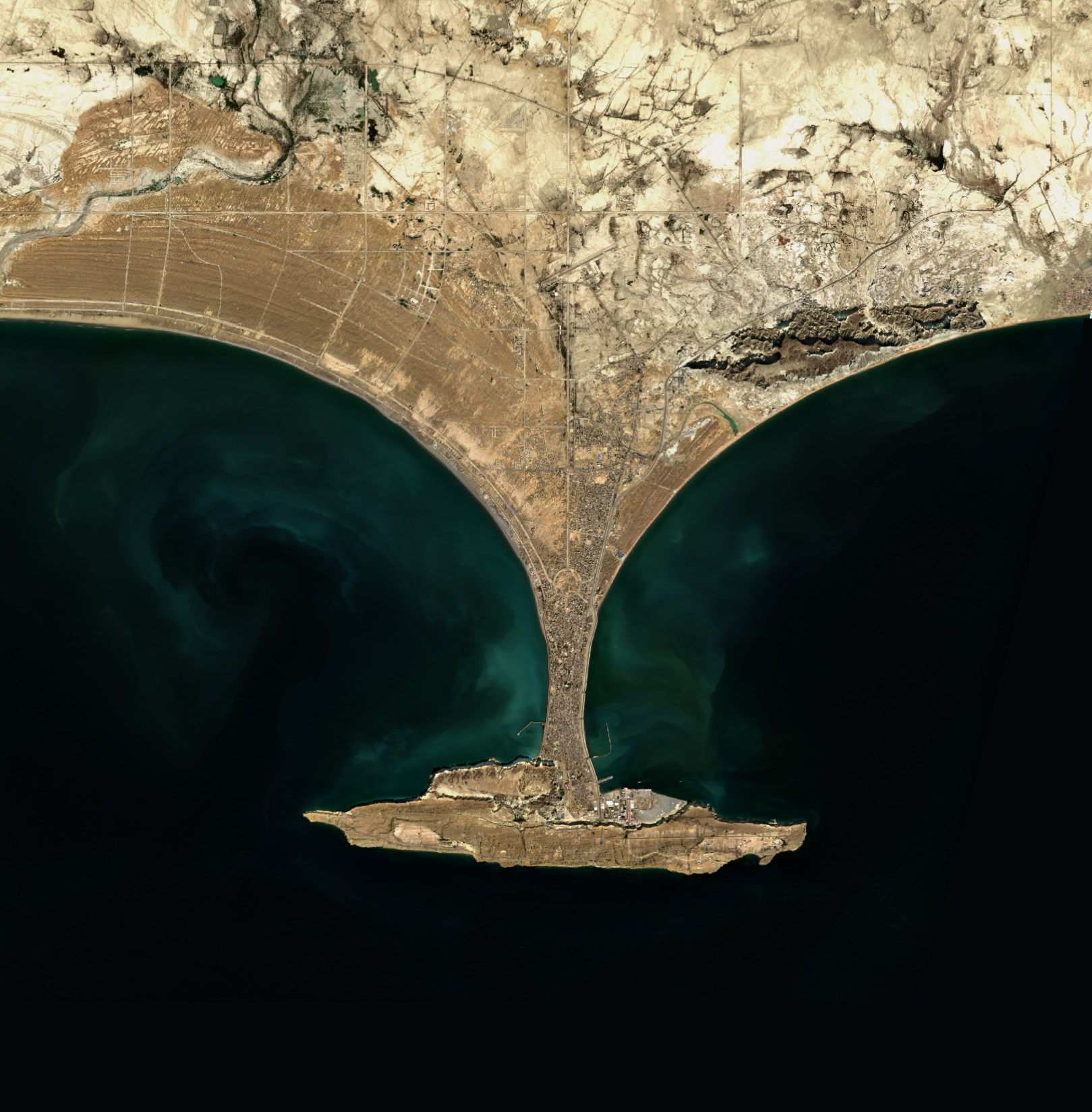
Aerial view of Gwadar city

Gwadar is situated on the southwestern Arabian Sea coast of Pakistan in Gwadar District of Balochistan province. Like Ormara further east, Gwadar is situated on a natural hammerhead-shaped tombolo peninsula forming two almost perfect, but naturally curved, semicircular bays on either side. The city is situated on a narrow and sandy 12 km-long (7 mi) isthmus which connects the Pakistani coast to rocky outcroppings in the Arabian sea known as the Gwadar Promontory, or Koh-e-Batil, which reach an elevation of 150 m (480 ft) and extend 11 km (7 mi) east to west with a breadth of 1.5 km (1 mi). The 240 m (800 ft) wide isthmus upon which Gwadar is located separates the two almost perfect semicircular bays from one another. The western bay is known as the Paddi Zirr, and is generally shallow with an average depth of 3.7 m (12 ft), and a maximum depth of 9.1 m (30 ft). To the east of the isthmus is the deepwater Demi Zirr harbour, where the Gwadar Port was built.

=== Climate ===
Gwadar has a hot desert climate (Köppen BWh), characterised by little precipitation and high variation between summer and winter temperatures. Oceanic influence from the cool currents of the Arabian Sea moderates temperatures, resulting in notably cooler summer temperatures compared to areas inland and cities in the Persian Gulf such as Dubai. The Arabian Sea also moderates winter temperatures, resulting in warmer winter nights as compared to inland areas.

The mean temperature in the hottest month (June) remains between 31 °C and 32 °C. The mean temperature in the coolest month (January) varies from 18 °C to 19 °C. The uniformity of temperature is a unique characteristic of the Makran Coastal region. Occasionally, winds moving down the Balochistan plateau bring brief cold spells, otherwise the winter is pleasant. In Gwadar, winters are shorter than summers. Although Gwadar is situated outside the monsoon belt, it receives light monsoon showers in summer (June–August). However, in winter, Western Disturbance can cause heavy rainfall. Annual rainfall is only 100 mm (3 inches). In June 2010, Gwadar was lashed by Cyclone Phet with record-breaking rains of 372 mm and winds up to 121 km/h (75 mph).

On 27–28 February 2024, Gwadar received a rainfall of 180 millimeters over 30 hours resulting in the flooding of the coastal town. Pakistan's uniformed forces and local authorities evacuated families from submerged localities. The floodings blocked all traffic between Gwadar and Karachi due to the damaged coastal highway that connects both the cities.

Climate data for Gwadar, Pakistan
Month	Jan	Feb	Mar	Apr	May	Jun	Jul	Aug	Sep	Oct	Nov	Dec	Year
Record high °C (°F)	31.1 (88.0)	33.0 (91.4)	40.5 (104.9)	44.7 (112.5)	45.7 (114.3)	48.0 (118.4)	42.5 (108.5)	39.5 (103.1)	41.1 (106.0)	41.0 (105.8)	37.5 (99.5)	33.1 (91.6)	48.0 (118.4)
Mean daily maximum °C (°F)	24.1 (75.4)	25.0 (77.0)	28.0 (82.4)	31.9 (89.4)	34.2 (93.6)	34.0 (93.2)	32.5 (90.5)	31.5 (88.7)	31.5 (88.7)	32.0 (89.6)	29.0 (84.2)	25.0 (77.0)	29.9 (85.8)
Mean daily minimum °C (°F)	13.8 (56.8)	15.1 (59.2)	18.4 (65.1)	21.7 (71.1)	24.9 (76.8)	26.9 (80.4)	26.9 (80.4)	25.8 (78.4)	24.4 (75.9)	21.7 (71.1)	18.0 (64.4)	15.1 (59.2)	21.1 (70.0)
Record low °C (°F)	2.3 (36.1)	1.3 (34.3)	8.0 (46.4)	12.5 (54.5)	15.5 (59.9)	20.0 (68.0)	20.8 (69.4)	20.5 (68.9)	18.0 (64.4)	13.0 (55.4)	5.5 (41.9)	0.5 (32.9)	0.5 (32.9)
Average precipitation mm (inches)	25.9 (1.02)	22.7 (0.89)	13.4 (0.53)	4.9 (0.19)	0.1 (0.00)	2.4 (0.09)	6.6 (0.26)	2.8 (0.11)	0.2 (0.01)	0.9 (0.04)	3.7 (0.15)	21.6 (0.85)	89.8 (3.54)

== Demographics ==
Population

Historical population

Year	Pop.	±% p.a.
1945	5,875	—
1972	15,794	+3.73%
1981	17,000	+0.82%

Year	Pop.	±% p.a.
1998	45,021	+5.90%
2017	90,201	+3.73%
2023	70,852	−3.94%

As Gwadar was part of Sultanate of Oman during the British rule, it was excluded from all the censuses of British India. According to the records of Oman from 1945, the Gwadar city had a population of 5,875. The population of the city has risen to approximately 85,000 as of 2014. In the 2017 census, Gwadar city had a total population of 90,762.

The population of city in 2023 was 70,852 according to the 2023 Census of Pakistan. The population of Gwadar tehsil was 147,041 (2023).

Gwadar has a diverse history attracting a mix of Baluchi, Kashmiri, Pashtun and Sindhis people throughout history. These various groups assimilated into local culture and are now considered native today. The Omani Massar also known as the "Omani Turban" was brought to Gwadar by Kashmiris who later brought it to Oman.

Languages

Languages of Gwadar city (2023 Census)
1. Balochi (96.2%)
2. Urdu (1.00%)
3. Brahvi (0.90%)
4. Lasi (Sindhi) (0.90%)
5. Others (1.00%)

The population of Gwadar is predominantly Baloch. 96.2% of the population in Gwadar tehsil speak the Baloch language as the mother tongue, followed by Urdu (1.0%), Brahui (0.9%), Lasi (Sindhi)(0.9%), Pashto (0.4%) and Saraiki (0.3).

== Administration ==
Gwadar serves as the headquarters for both the Gwadar District and Gwadar Tehsil. Gwadar Tehsil is administratively subdivided into five union councils.

On 2 April 2021, Gwadar was granted the title of capital of South Balochistan by the Balochistan government.

=== Neighbourhoods ===
Gwadar is divided into 5 union councils, which are further subdivided into wards:

- Gwadar Central
  - Gazrawan
  - Komagri
  - Mohallah Zahoor Shah
  - Saleh Muhammad
  - Sohrabi
  - Usmania
- South Gwadar
  - Kamari
  - Mohallah Karim Bakhsh
  - Mohallah Shahdu Band
  - Mullah Band
  - Murad Bakhsh
  - Sarabi
  - Sheikh Umar
  - Tobagh
- North Gwadar
  - Lal Baksh
  - Mohalla Baloch
  - Mohalla Mir Abdul Ghafoor
  - Mujahid
- Pishukan
- Surbandar

== Culture ==
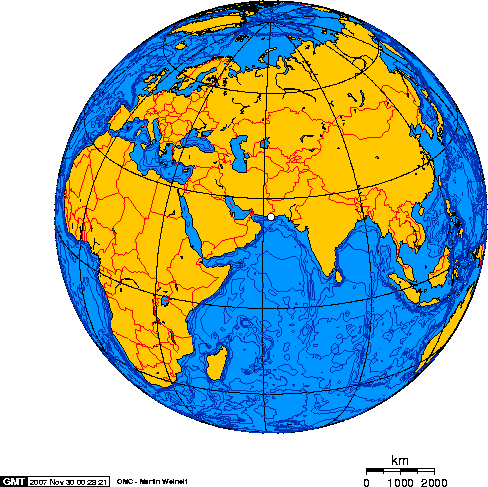
Gwadar is located across the mouth of the Persian Gulf from the Arabian Peninsula.

Gwadar's location and history have given it a unique blend of cultures. The Arabic influence upon Gwadar is strong as a consequence of the Omani era and its close proximity to the Arabian peninsula. Remnants of Oman era buildings can also be found in the city.

== Strategic importance ==
Central Asia and South Asia, encompassing the Caspian region, Central Asian republics, Afghanistan and Iran, and the energy-rich 'lake' called the Caspian Sea, is a significant region because of its huge monetary prospective and geographically vital positioning, which has formed the region as a centre piece in the international arena. Iran has also declared support for the development of Gwadar and its port.

== Economy ==
=== Gwadar Free Zone ===
The construction on a $20 billion 10-square kilometre tax exempt industrial zone began on 20 June 2016. The zone includes a 300MW coal powerplant exclusive for the industrial zone. Despite Chinese investment, much of this development, including the power plant, remains unfinished.

=== Gwadar Port ===
The Chinese share of revenue generated from Gwadar Port would be 91% while Pakistan will get 9% share. China has a great strategic interest in Gwadar. In 2013, the state-owned China Overseas Port Holdings Limited acquired Gwadar Port. The port is strategically important for China as sixty percent of China's oil comes from the Persian Gulf by ships traveling over 16,000 km (9,900 mi) in two to three months, confronting pirates, bad weather, political rivals, and other risks up to its only commercial port, Shanghai. Gwadar will reduce the distance to a mere 5,000 km (3,100 mi) and also operate year-round.

China is heavily dependent on Persian Gulf oil which passes through the Strait of Malacca all the way through the Indian and Pacific Oceans. Once the oil reaches China's east coast ports, it is transported thousands of kilometres inland to western China. The Gwadar Port–Karakoram Highway (KKH) route is sometimes said to be safer, cheaper and shorter than transporting the oil by ocean tanker. However, research suggests that transporting oil by roadways from Gwadar to China would be very expensive, would encounter numerous logistical difficulties such as mountainous terrain, earthquakes, disputes with India, and potential terrorist attacks, and would barely make any impact on China's overall energy security, though Pakistan intends to build an oil pipeline to northern Pakistan that may allay much of these concerns.

Chinese goods flowing in the opposite direction may be able to find an easier, shorter and secure route to the Middle East. The city is also being developed as an export processing zone for foreign companies to manufacture in Gwadar before exporting to various countries in the region.

=== Reko Diq Transport ===
As of 2024, the government of Pakistan is constructing a highway between the port of Gwadar and Reko Diq Mine in Northwest Baluchistan. This will allow for the transportation of mining supplies and to the mine and concentrate by truck. There are also plans for a slurry line and a railroad.

=== New Gwadar International Airport ===
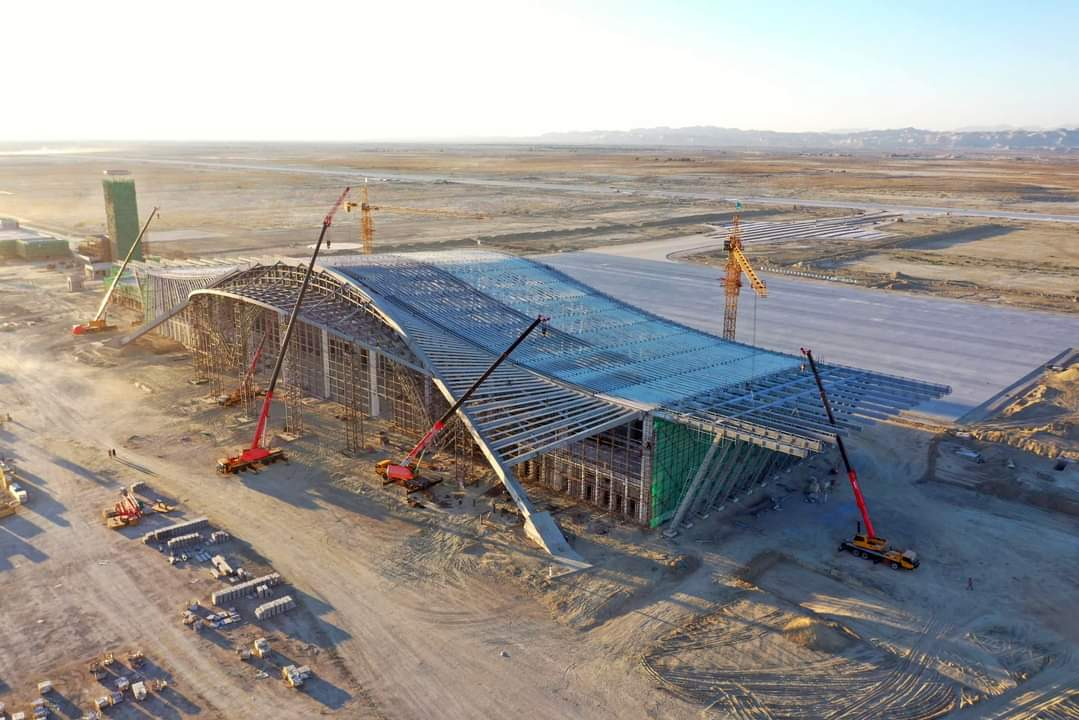
Gwadar International Airport, under construction, in 2022.

Pakistani Prime Minister Imran Khan laid down the foundation stone for the New Gwadar International Airport (NGIA) at Gwadar on 29 March 2019. Built at a cost of Rs. 66 billion (around $230 million USD), the airport was inaugurated in October 2024 and began commercial operations and flights on 20 January 2025. The New Gwadar International Airport is located around 26 km (16 mi) northeast of Gwadar City proper. It has an area of 1,700 ha (4,300 acres), and can handle larger aircraft such as the Airbus A380. The new airport will cater to domestic and international flights, and will have an open skies policy.

It is be a greenfield airport, with a cargo terminal handling capacity of 30,000 tonnes a year. The single runway will measure 3,658 m (12,001 ft) in length with a width of 75 m (246 ft), to accommodate wide-bodied aircraft; if needed in the near future, there is the likely potential for a second runway to be constructed. The CAA Pakistan has awarded the design and construction contract to the China Communications Construction Company (CCCC).

== Twin towns and sister cities ==
Gwadar

- Padang, Indonesia.

== Education ==
The literacy rate stood at 51.5% in the 2023 census. According to Pakistan District Education Rankings, a report by Alif Ailaan, district Gwadar is ranked nationally at 61, with an education score of 59.47 and learning score of 62.65. Enrollment levels are low in Gwadar because of fewer schools in the district. And the level of enrollment declines as the classes move up. The city's main university is the University of Gwadar, which was established in 2021.

The school infrastructure score of Gwadar is 29.91, giving it a national rank of 122. 33% of all the schools in the district cater to girls as compared to 67% schools for boys, putting girls at a greater disadvantage. Lack of science labs and subject specialists teachers are also a major concern.

Overcrowding, teachers teaching two classes at the same time, lack of science teachers and lack of playing grounds are the issues faced by the residents of Gwadar.

== See also ==
- Gwadar Cricket Stadium
- Gwadar Fish Harbour
- Gwadar Shipyard
- Shri Krishna Mandir, Gwadar
- Gwadar Oil City
- University of Gwadar
