= Viqar-un-Nisa Noon =

Pakistani political leader

Begum Viqar-un-Nisa Noon
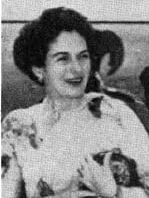
- Noon in 1958

Spouse of the Prime Minister of Pakistan
- In office 16 December 1957 – 7 October 1958
- Prime Minister: Feroz Khan Noon
- Preceded by: Begum Hailma

Personal details
- Born: Victoria Rekha; July 1920 First Austrian Republic
- Died: 16 January 2000 (aged 79) Islamabad, Pakistan
- Spouse: Feroz Khan Noon (m. 1945; died 1970)
- Occupation: Social worker
- Awards: Nishan-e-Imtiaz

Begum Viqar-un-Nisa Noon (née Victoria Rekha; July 1920 – 16 January 2000), also known as Viqar un Nisa Noon or Viqarunnisa Noon, was an Austrian-Pakistani social worker and member of the Pakistan Movement. Noon served as the Spouse of the Prime Minister of Pakistan from 1957 to 1958, and played a key role in the Gwadar Purchase.

== Involvement with Pakistan Movement ==
Victoria Rekha was born in July 1920 in First Austrian Republic (present-day Austria). She married 7th Pakistani Prime Minister Sir Feroz Khan Noon in 1945. After her marriage, she converted to Islam, and renamed herself from Victoria to Viqar un Nisa. The Noons left Delhi the same year after Sir Feroz Khan Noon resigned from the Indian Viceroy's cabinet and moved to Lahore. Lady Noon had firsthand exposure to Pakistani politics and involved herself with local politics, becoming a member of the Punjab Provincial Women's Subcommittee, organizing rallies and processions for the Muslim League. During the Civil disobedience movement in Punjab, Lady Noon helped organize protests and demonstrations against the British-backed Malik Khizar Hayat Tiwana's cabinet, being arrested three times.

== Accession of Gwadar ==
Viqar-un-Nisa Noon played a big role in the accession of Gwadar to Pakistan. She reportedly worked hard in London in 1956 to get Gwadar for Pakistan through British PM and parliament's approval for British colony Oman to give custody to Pakistan. She visited Winston Churchill for lobbying at British parliament in 1956 for ' Gwadar port' to be given to Pakistan and get approval from House of Lords.

== Social work ==
Following the independence of Pakistan from British rule in 1947 and the mass transfer of people across the border, she engaged in ameliorating the refugee crisis, lending assistance to various refugee camps and committees. She was involved with the Red Cross and engaged herself in local social work. She helped found Viqar un Nisa College for Women, Rawalpindi, Pakistan and the Viqarunnisa Noon School and College, a prestigious school and college for girls in Dhaka, Bangladesh.

== Later life ==
Her husband Feroz Khan Noon later became the first Governor of East Pakistan and ultimately the Prime Minister of Pakistan in 1957. After his death, she continued to be involved in social work activities, along with other prominent lady social workers of Pakistan, such as late Begum Mahmooda Salim Khan, Attiya Inayatullah and Begum Zari Sarfaraz; and remained a senior and executive member of such organisations as the Family Planning Association of Pakistan, Pakistan Red Crescent Society, the National Crafts Council of Pakistan and others.

She was chairperson of the Pakistan Tourism Development Corporation in 1983 and 1984. In her later life, she spent a great deal of her time at her cottage "Al-Feroz", in the hills near Abbottabad, Pakistan, and in scenic Islamabad, where she found creative solace to paint and write.

== Awards and recognition ==
In 1959, she was awarded the Nishan-e-Imtiaz (Medal of Excellence) for her services to the nation by the Government of Pakistan.

== Death ==
Viqar-un-Nisa Noon died on 16 January 2000, aged 79, in Islamabad after a prolonged illness.

According to the newspaper Dawn in January 2021, "GWADAR plays a pivotal role in the China-Pakistan Economic Corridor (CPEC), which is termed a game-changer that is bound to boost the national economy". Many credit then-Prime Minister Feroz Khan Noon and his wife for making it possible.

== Acknowledgment ==
- Viqar un Nisa Noon Girls Higher Secondary Institute, Rawalpindi, Pakistan
- Vicky Noon Educational Foundation
- Viqarunnisa Noon School and College, Dhaka, Bangladesh
