= Gwadar Development Authority =

Public Corporation in Gwadar, Pakistan

- اداره ترقیاتی گوادر

Agency overview
- Formed: March 2003; 23 years ago
- Headquarters: Gwadar, Pakistan
- Chairman responsible: Chief Minister Balochistan
- Parent agency: Government of Balochistan
- Website: www.gda.gov.pk

Gwadar Development Authority (GDA;Urdu: اداره ترقیاتی گوادر; Balochi: ادارہ گوادر توسعه) is a public and government sector corporation responsible for providing municipal services in Gwadar City (Southwestern Arabian Sea Coastline of Pakistan), established in October 2003, to improve, enhancement and implement the master plan for Gwadar city.

== History ==
Starting of work on the Gwadar Port in March 2002, it was expected that there will be a massive growth in Gwadar town and their suburb areas. In order to manage and regulate this huge growth rate, a Gwadar Master Plan was introduced. The Gwadar Development Authority (GDA) was established in October 2003 to improve, enhancement and implement and regulate the Master Plan, which formally suggested only the land use in Gwadar city. After the establishment of the GDA Authority, the internal road network in the city, residential and commercial land zoning, and the vision and mission for the future of Gwadar was developed and finalized.

== List of Directorates ==
- Directorate of Town Planning
- Directorate of Environment
- Directorate of Administration
- Directorate of Finance and Account
- Directorate of Estate and Land Management

== Wings ==
- Planning Wing
- Registration Wing
- GIS Wing
- Survey Wing
- Agricultural Wing
- Air Quality Wing
- Municipal Wing
- Administration Wing
- I.T Wing
- HRM Wing
- Legal Wing
- Transport Wing
- Staff Welfare Wing
- Building Wing
- Electrical Wing
- Design Section Wing
- Road Section Wing
- Land Revenue Wing
- Land Management Wing
- Auditing Wing
- Record Section Wing

== Services & Incentives ==
GDA is committed to develop Gwadar town and its suburb areas as one of the modern cities and a first-class residential and commercial area of Pakistan and around the world. There isn't a single piece of land owned by the government, so GDA is only a managerial body that:

- Manage the used land and Implement the Master Plan.
- Monitor the public and private schemes and projects daily basis until completion.
- Provide all the facilities that mentioned in the Master Plan to Public.
- Economic Free Zone across Gwadar city.
- Subsidized Electricity for Gwadar city.
- 5 Roads that connecti Gwadar city with other neighbor Asian countries like Afghanistan, China and India, and countries in Central Asia.
