= Government of Balochistan, Pakistan =

Government of Balochistan

Legislative branch
- Name: Balochistan Assembly
- Presiding officer: Abdul Khaliq Khan (PML-N), Speaker

Executive branch
- Head of state
- Title: Governor
- Currently: Sheikh Jaffar Khan Mandokhail
- Head of government
- Title: Chief Minister
- Currently: Sarfraz Bugti

Judicial branch
- Balochistan High Court
- Chief judge: Muhammad Hashim Kakar

The Government of Balochistan (Urdu: حکومتِ بلوچستان; Balochi: حکومت بلوچستان .; Pashto: د بلوچستان حکومت; Dari: حکومت بلوچستان), formerly is the provincial government of the largest province of Balochistan in Quetta. The head of the province is the Governor, who is nominated by the President of Pakistan. The chief executive of the Government of Balochistan is the Chief Minister who is elected by the Balochistan Assembly and the administrative head of the province is the Chief Secretary of Balochistan who is appointed by the Prime Minister of Pakistan.

The province of Balochistan contains most of the historical Balochistan and is named after the Baloch people. Neighbouring regions are Iranian Balochistan and Sistan to the west, Afghanistan and the former Federally Administered Tribal Areas of Pakistan to the north and Punjab and Sindh to the east. The principal languages in the province are Balochi, Pashto, Brahui, and Persian.

== Personnel ==
Designation	Name
Governor	Sheikh Jaffar Khan Mandokhail
Chief Minister of Balochistan	Sarfraz Bugti
Chief Secretary	Shakeel Qadir Khan

== Executive of Balochistan ==
The government of Balochistan consists of 26 Departments and some allied offices. These 26 Departments are headed by Provincial Secretaries. The Provincial Secretaries are headed by Chief Secretary Balochistan. Presently there are 18 Ministers who look after 27 Departments.

- Agricultural & Cooperatives
- Chief Minister's Inspection Team
- Communication Works, Physical Planning and Housing
- Culture, Tourism and Archives
- Education
- Environment, Sports and Youth Affairs
- Finance
- Fisheries
- Balochistan Forests & Wildlife Department
- Religious Affairs and Interfaith Harmony
- Health
- Home & Tribal Affairs
- Industries and Commerce
- Information
- Board of Revenue
- Irrigation
- Labour and Manpower
- Law & Parliamentary Affairs
- Livestock and Dairy Development Department (LDDD)
- Local Government and Rural Development
- Mines and Minerals
- Planning and Development
- Population Welfare
- Energy Department
- Prosecution
- Provincial Disaster and Management Authority
- Provincial Transport Authority
- Science and Information Technology
- Services and General Administration
- Social Welfare, Special Education, Literacy/ Non-Formal Education and Human Rights
- Civil Defence
- Urban Planning and Development
- Excise, Taxation & Anti-Narcotics
- Women Development Department
- Printing & Stationery
- Balochistan Police

=== Autonomous Bodies ===
- Balochistan Development Authority
- Quetta Development Authority
- Gwadar Development Authority
- Balochistan Public Service Commission
- Balochistan Technical Education & Voccational Training Authority
- Balochistan board of Investment and Trade
- Balochistan Public Private Partnership Authority

== Legislature ==
Balochistan's provincial assembly consists of 65 members out of which 11 seats are reserved for women while 3 are reserved for minorities.

== VIP Aircraft ==
A former Learjet 31A jet of the Government of Balochistan landing.

VIP aircraft operated by Government of Balochistan:

=== Current ===
Aircraft	Image	Quantity	Note
Learjet 45XR		1	
Mil Mi-17		2	

=== Former ===
Aircraft	Image	Quantity	Note
Learjet 31A		1	Gifted to the Government of Azad Kashmir.

== See also ==
- Balochistan Assembly
- Chief Minister of Balochistan
- Balochistan
- Quetta, Provincial capital of Balochistan
