= List of All-India Muslim League breakaway parties =

Since India and Pakistan gained independence in 1947, the All-India Muslim League and its successor Muslim League has seen a steady number of splits and breakaway factions. Some of the breakaway organisations have thrived as independent parties, some have become defunct, while others have merged with the parent party or other political parties. The All-India Muslim League was dissolved in 1947 after the partition. Muslim League (Pakistan) was dissolved in 1958 (by martial law).

== List of breakaway parties ==
Year	Party	Leader	Country	Status
1940	All-India Jamhur Muslim League	Mohammad Amir Ahmad Khan and Maghfoor Ahmad Ajazi	British India	merged with Indian National Congress
1947	Muslim League (Pakistan)	Muhammad Ali Jinnah	Pakistan	Dissolved by martial law in 1958
1948	Indian Union Muslim League	M. Muhammad Ismail	India	active
1949	All Pakistan Awami Muslim League	Abdul Hamid Khan Bhashani and Huseyn Shaheed Suhrawardy	Pakistan	changed name to Awami League
1949	Jinnah Muslim League	Iftikhar Hussain Khan Mamdot	Pakistan	defunct
1955	Republican Party	Khan Abdul Jabbar Khan	Pakistan	defunct
1962	Pakistan Muslim League	Nurul Amin	Pakistan	defunct
1962	Convention Muslim League	Ayub Khan	Pakistan	defunct
1962	Council Muslim League	Mumtaz Daultana	Pakistan	defunct
1970	Pakistan Muslim League (Qayyum)	Abdul Qayyum Khan	Pakistan	defunct
1971	Bangladesh Muslim League	Abdus Sabur Khan	Bangladesh	active
1975	Muslim League (Opposition)	Ummer Bafaqy Thangal	India	merged with Indian Union Muslim League in 1985
1985	Pakistan Muslim League (F)	Syed Shah Mardan Shah-II	Pakistan	active
1993	Pakistan Muslim League (J)	Muhammad Khan Junejo	Pakistan	active
1993	Pakistan Muslim League (N)	Nawaz Sharif	Pakistan	active
1995	Pakistan Muslim League (Jinnah)	Manzoor Wattoo	Pakistan	defunct
2002	Pakistan Muslim League (Z)	Ijaz-ul-Haq	Pakistan	active
2002	Pakistan Muslim League (Q)	Chaudhry Shujaat Hussain	Pakistan	active
2008	Awami Muslim League	Sheikh Rashid Ahmed	Pakistan	active
2009	Pakistan Peoples Muslim League	Arbab Ghulam Rahim	Pakistan	defunct
2010	All Pakistan Muslim League	Pervez Musharraf	Pakistan	defunct
