= 1951 North-West Frontier Province provincial election =

Pakistani provincial election

← 1946	10 December 1951	1956 →

All 85 seats in the Provincial Assembly 43 seats needed for a majority
- Registered: 1,346,938
- Turnout: 49%

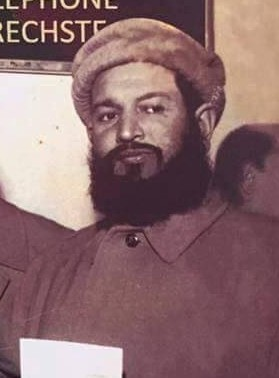
	Majority party	Minority party
Leader	Abdul Qayyum Khan	Amin ul-Hasanat
Party	PML	JAML
Last election	17 seats	–
Seats won	67	4
Seat change	▲50	New
Premier before election
Abdul Qayyum Khan
PML
Elected Premier
Abdul Qayyum Khan
PML

Provincial Assembly elections were held in the North-West Frontier Province of the Dominion of Pakistan in 1951 to elect all 85 members of the Provincial Assembly, alongside provincial elections in West Punjab. It was Pakistan's first provincial assembly election. The Muslim League won the election, defeating the Jinnah Awami Muslim League coalition of the Jinnah Muslim League and All-Pakistan Awami Muslim League.

== Background ==
In the 1946 Indian provincial elections the Indian National Congress achieved a strong majority in North-West Frontier Province, largely due to the personality of Khudai Khidmatgar leader Abdul Ghaffar Khan, enabling them to form a government. Although Khan strongly opposed the partition of India, a 1947 referendum regarding accession to Pakistan was held. Khan boycotted the referendum, which resulted in a large majority voting to join Pakistan.

Following Pakistani independence, the Muslim League called for Khan's government to be removed. This was achieved when Governor-General Muhammad Ali Jinnah dismissed Khan's cabinet and appointed Abdul Qayyum Khan as new Chief Minister. In 1951 Qayyum announced the holding of provincial elections, which received negative reactions as most political leaders were in jail or exile. Although the Provincial Assembly was dissolved, Qayyum's government remained in power still as the interim government.

== Results ==
The number of seats in the Assembly was increased from 50 to 85, including three reserved seats (two for Muslim women and one for non-Muslims). A total of 240 candidates contested the elections, of which 84 were from the Muslim League (nine of whom were unopposed), 46 from the Jinnah Awami Muslim League, five from the Azad Muslim League, three from Jamaat-e-Islami and four from the Islami League. Around 660,000 voters voted in the election, a turnout of 49%.

Qayyum led the Muslim League to a landslide victory, winning 67 of the 85 seats.

Party	Seats	+/–
Muslim League	67	+50
Jinnah Awami Muslim League	4	New
Jamaat-e-Islami	0	New
Islami League	0	New
Azad Muslim League	0	New
Non-Muslim	1	–
Independent	13	+12
Total	85	+35
Source: Kamran

== Aftermath ==
After the elections, Qayyum formed a ministry with himself as Chief Minister, Mian Jaffar Shah as Education Minister, Jalal Baba as Local Self-Government Minister, M. R. Kiyani as Health Minister and Mir Ayub Khan as Revenue Minister.
