= Babrra massacre =

1948 mass shooting by police in present-day Khyber Pakhtunkhwa, Pakistan

Babrra incident د بابړې خونړۍ پېښه
- Babrra ground (Khyber Pakhtunkhwa)
- Location: 34°08′35″N 71°43′39″E; Babrra ground, Hashtnagar region, Charsadda District, North-West Frontier Province (present-day Khyber Pakhtunkhwa), Pakistan
- Date: 12 August 1948; 78 years ago
- Target: Supporters of the Khudai Khidmatgar movement
- Attack type: murder, mass shooting
- Deaths: 15 (official figure); 150 (Khudai Khidmatgar claim)
- Injuries: 40 (official figures); 400 (Khudai Khidmatgar claim)
- Perpetrators: C.M. Abdul Qayyum Khan Kashmiri, State police

The Babrra Massacre (or Babara Massacre; Pashto: د بابړې خونړۍ پېښه) was a mass shooting by state police on 12 August 1948 in the North-West Frontier Province (NWFP) of Pakistan (now called as Khyber Pakhtunkhwa). According to official figures, around 15 protestors were killed while around 40 were injured. However, Khudai Khidmatgar sources maintained that around 150 were killed and 400 were injured. It is also referred as the Karbala of Pathans.

It happened on Babrra ground in Charsadda District on the order of the chief minister of the NWFP, Abdul Qayyum Khan Kashmiri (not to be confused with Sahibzada Abdul Qayyum Khan, NWFP's first chief minister during the British Raj).

== Background ==
The Khudai Khidmatgar was a non-violent peaceful Pashtun movement which was led by Abdul Ghaffar Khan (Bacha Khan), a leader in the Indian Independence Movement.

The movement was initially focused on reform to the status of the Pashtuns under the British Raj and later focused on the independence of Colonial India from British rule. The movement's leader, Abdul Ghaffar Khan, was a supporter of a United India and wanted North-West Frontier Province (present-day Khyber Pakhtunkhwa) to join United India.

Until 1930, the Pashtuns were not very involved in politics. In the 1937 Indian provincial elections, the movement won the elections for the North-West Frontier Province in alliance with the Congress Party, as Bacha Khan's brother, Khan Abdul Jabbar Khan (Dr. Khan Sahib), became the provincial chief minister.

The movement also won an absolute majority in the 1946 Indian provincial elections. Despite the Bannu Resolution in which the Khudai Khidmatgars demanded that the province should become Pashtunistan or join Afghanistan, the British refused and had only offered two choices, to join an independent India or to join the new nation of Pakistan. The NWFP joined the Dominion of Pakistan as a result of the 1947 NWFP referendum which had been boycotted by the Khudai Khidmatgar.

== Massacre ==
Before the Babrra Massacre, the elected provincial government of Dr. Khan Sahib in the North-West Frontier Province was terminated by Muhammad Ali Jinnah, the Governor-General of Pakistan. A Muslim League leader, Abdul Qayyum Khan Kashmiri, was appointed as the new chief minister of the NWFP on 23 August 1947.

The new provincial government imprisoned the Khudai Khidmatgar’s anti-Pakistan movement's leader, Bacha Khan, as well as the deposed chief minister Dr. Khan Sahib, and some other notable figures of the region. In July 1948, the governor of the NWFP, Ambrose Flux Dundas promulgated an ordinance, authorizing the provincial government to detain anyone and confiscate their property without giving a reason.

On 12 August 1948, supporters of the Khudai Khidmatgar movement protested against the arrest of their leaders and the new ordinance enforced by the government. The protesters marched from Charsadda to Babrra ground. However, when they reached Babrra ground, Abdul Qayyum Khan ordered the police to open fire on protesters. According to official figures, around 15 protesters were killed while around 40 were injured. However, Khudai Khidmatgar sources maintained that around 150 were killed and 400 were injured.

== Aftermath ==
In mid-September 1948, the central government of Pakistan banned the Khudai Khidmatgar movement and many of its supporters were arrested. The provincial government destroyed the centre of the Khudai Khidmatgar movement at Sardaryab, Charsadda District.

In July 1950, Huseyn Shaheed Suhrawardy, president of the All Pakistan Awami Muslim League (which later evolved into the Awami League) and later Prime Minister of Pakistan, said at a large gathering in Dhaka, East Bengal (present-day Bangladesh): “The barbarous massacre of the Red Shirts (Khudai Khidmatgars) committed at Charsadda in 1948 surpassed the Jallianwala Bagh massacre committed by the British in 1919.”

== See also ==
- List of massacres in Pakistan
- 2014 Peshawar school massacre
