= Ahmad Yar Khan Daultana =

Politician from Punjab (1896 – 1940)

The Honourable Mian Ahmad Yar Khan Daultana CBE

Personal details
- Born: 13 April 1896
- Died: c. 1940
- Children: Mumtaz Daultana; Bibi Mehrafrooz; Bibi Taugir
- Parent: Mian Ghulam Kadir Khan
- Education: Government College, Lahore; Aitchison College

Mian Ahmad Yar Khan Daultana CBE (Urdu: میاں احمد یار خان دولتانہ; 13 April 1896 – 1940) was the Chief of the Daultanas of Luddan and a politician from Punjab.

== Early life, family and education ==
He was born at Luddan on 13 April 1896 to Mian Ghulam Kadir Khan. His father died while performing Hajj. As he was a minor, the responsibility for his care then fell upon his grandfather, who also passed away shortly thereafter. Following this, he and his property were taken under the protection of the Government under the Court of Wards. He was educated at Aitchison College, Lahore, where he won four out of five school medals, including the highly coveted Rivaz Medal. During his time there, he founded the Chiefs’ College Dramatic Club and left the school in 1917. He subsequently studied at Government College, Lahore, for one year and nine months.

He married and had issue: a son, Mumtaz Daultana, and two daughters, Bibi Mehrafrooz and Bibi Taugir.

== Political career ==
In 1921, he was elected unopposed to the first Reformed Council from the Western Multan Mohammadan constituency. He was re-elected in 1926 from the same constituency; however, on this occasion, he contested the seat and secured victory by a majority of 1,835 votes. In 1930, he was returned to the Council as a representative of the Punjab Mohammadan landholders. In the 1937 elections, held under the new Constitution, he was elected to the Punjab Legislative Assembly. He served as Secretary of the Unionist Party and also as Chief Parliamentary Secretary of the Punjab Government.

== Death ==
He died in 1940. Upon his death, Sikandar Hayat Khan addressed a large gathering at Luddan and urged them to return his uncle, Mian Allah Yar Khan Daultana, unopposed to the Punjab Legislative Assembly for the vacancy caused by Ahmad’s death. This was done accordingly.

== Honours ==
In the 1939 New Year Honours list, he was appointed Commander of the Order of the British Empire by George VI.
