= 1951 Punjab provincial election =

Election in Pakistan

1951 West Punjab Legislative Assembly election
- 31 March 1951

All 192 seats in the Legislative Assembly 97 seats needed for a majority
- Registered: 45,00,000
- Turnout: 44%
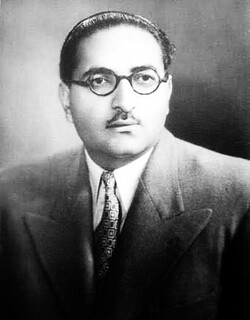

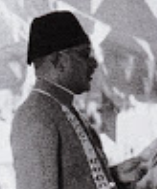
	Majority party	Minority party
Leader	Mumtaz Daultana	Iftikhar Hussain Khan Mamdot
Party	PML	JAML
Leader's seat	Multan-XIII	Lahore-I
Seats won	143	32
Seat change	▲70	▲32
Percentage	51.1	22.7
Premier before election
Governor Rule
PML
Elected Premier
Mumtaz Daultana
PML

Provincial Assembly elections were held in the Dominion of Pakistan in 1951 to elect all 192 members of the Provincial Assembly of West Punjab along with other provincial election in North-West Frontier Province. It was Pakistan's first provincial assembly election. Pakistan Muslim League won the election, and defeated the JAML coalition of the Jinnah Muslim League and All-Pakistan Awami Muslim League .

== Background ==
After the independence of Pakistan in 1947, the Punjab Province was divided and West Punjab was given to the Dominion of Pakistan which became Muslim majority region soon after the partition of India. Nawab Iftikhar Hussain Khan Mamdot became the premier of the province after independence and a ministry was formed by him. His ministry was accused of corruption and nepotism. After this, his ministry was dissolved in 1949. Later in 1950 governor Abdur Rab Nishtar announced a provincial election to be held.

== Results ==
The election was for 197 seats. There were 44 additional two-seat constituency with 50% for Muhajir. 4 seats were reserved for Christians and Anglo-Indians.

Party	Seats	+/–
Muslim League	143	New
Jinnah Awami Muslim League	32	New
Jamaat-e-Islami and Azad Pakistan Party	1	New
Islami League	0	New
Communist Party	0	New
Independent	16	–
Total	192	0
Source: Kokab

== Elected members ==
Serial	Member
1	Abbas Khan, Seth Malik
2	Abdul Bari, Mian
3	Abdul Ghani Harl, Chaudhri (Sheikhupura-III ― Muslim)
4	Abdul Hamid Khan, Rana (Montgomery-VIII ― Muslim)
5	Abdul Hamid Nakai, Sardar, B.A. (Hons) (Lahore-V ― Muslim)
6	Abdul Hamid, Mr (Lyallpur-VI ― Muslim Reserved Seat)
7	Abdul Haq, Mian (Montgomery-III ― Muslim)
8	Abdul Latif, Mian, B.A., LL.B. (Sheikhupura-V ― Muslim Reserved Seat)
9	Abdul Majid Qureshi, Sahnavi, Mr (Multan-VII ― Muslim Reserved Seat)
10	Abdul Qayyum, Mir, B.A., Ll.B. (Lyallpur-I ― Muslim)
11	Abdul Rahim, Chaudhri (Sialkot-X ― Muslim)
12	Abdul Waheed Khan, Mr (Corporation of the city of Lahore-IV ― Muslim Reserved Seat)
13	Abdul Wahid, Alhaj Mian (Lyallpur-X ― Muslim)
14	Abdullah Khan, Major Amir (Shahpur-X ― Muslim)
15	Abdur Rehman Khan, Rao (Multan-IX ― Muslim Reserved Seat)
16	Abdus Sattar Khan Niazi, Khan (Mianwali-II ― Muslim)
17	Abid Hussain Shah, Lt Col Saiyad (Jhang-III ― Muslim)
18	Abu Saeed Enver, Mr (Corporation of the city of Lahore-III ― Muslim)
19	Ahmed Ali, Sardar (Lahore-IV ― Muslim)
20	Ahmed Masud Said, Mr (Lyallpur-II ― Muslim Reserved Seat)
21	Ahmed Saeed Kirmani, Mr (Corporation of the city of Lahore-V ― Muslim)
22	Ahmed Yar Khan, Mehr (Shahpur-VIII ― Muslim)
23	Ali Sher Khan, Chaudhri (Sheikhupura-IV ― Muslim Reserved Seat)
24	Altaf Hussain Bokhari, Saiyad (Jhang-VIII ― Muslim)
25	Altaf Mohy-ud-Din Qadri, Saiyad, M.A. (Sialkot-V ― Muslim Reserved Seat)
26	Amir Ali Khan, Subedar, Raja (Rawalpindi-VII ― Muslim)
27	Amir Hussain Shah, Saiyad (Gujrat-IV ― Muslim)
28	Amir Muhammad Khan, Nawabzada (Mianwali-VI ― Muslim)
29	Amir-ud-Din, Mian (Corporation of the city of Lahore-II ― Muslim)
30	Asghar Ali Khan, Lt. Col., Nawabzada Chaudhri (Gujrat-II ― Muslim)
31	Ata Muhammad Khan Khosa, Sardar (Dera Ghazi Khan-III ― Muslim)
32	Aziz Din, Chaudhri, B.A., LL.B. (Lyallpur-III ― Muslim)
33	Bahadur Khan Drishak, Sardar (Dera Ghazi Khan-IV ― Muslim)
34	Bahawal Sher, Malik (Montgomery-II ― Muslim)
35	Chandu Lal, Chaudhri (Pakistani Christian and Anglo-Pakistani-II)
36	Daud Ghaznavi, Maulana (Lahore-V ― Muslim Reserved Seat)
37	Dost Muhammad Khan, Mian (Gujranwala-VIII ― Muslim)
38	Faiz Ahmad, Chaudhri, B.A., LL.B. (Shahpur-IX ― Muslim)
39	Faiz Ahmad, Mian (Montgomery-IX ― Muslim Reserved Seat)
40	Faiz Hussain, Malik (Sialkot-VII ― Muslim)
41	Faiz Muhammad, Mian (Jhang-I ― Muslim)
42	Fateh Muhammad Khan Tiwana, Malik (Shahpur-V ― Muslim)
43	Fateh Muhammad, Captain Mian (Gujrat-VI ― Muslim)
44	Fateh Sher Jhumat, Malik (Mianwali-IV ― Muslim)
45	Fazal Elahi, Chaudhri, M.A., LL.B. (Alig) (Gujrat-VII ― Muslim)
46	Fazal Hussain, Malik (Gujranwala-VI ― Muslim)
47	Ghulam Abbas Bokhari, Dewan Saiyad, alias Mr Muhammad Sultan Ahmad (Multan-V ― Muslim)
48	Ghulam Haider, Mr (Jhang-VI ― Muslim)
49	Ghulam Muhammad, Mian (Montgomery-VI ― Muslim)
50	Ghulam Murtaza, Haji Khawaja (Dera Ghazi Khan-VIII ― Muslim)
51	Ghulam Mustafa Shah Khalid Gilani, Saiyad (Rawalpindi-III ― Muslim)
52	Ghulam Nabi, Malik (Corporation of the city of Lahore-I ― Muslim Reserved Seat)
53	Ghulam Rasul Tarar, Chaudhri (Gujrat-IX ― Muslim)
54	Ghulam Sabir Khan, Mr (Montgomery-VI ― Muslim Reserved Seat)
55	Ghulam Sadid-ud-Din, Khawaja, Hafiz (Dera Ghazi Khan-VII ― Muslim)
56	Gibbon, Mr C.E. (Pakistani Christian and Anglo-Pakistani-III) (Deputy Opposition Leader) (Performed the functions of Leader of Opposition during the absence of Mian Abdul Bari in the session held from 22/11/1954 to 11/12/1954)
57	Gul Muhammad Noon alias Mr Abdul Aziz (Multan-IV ― Muslim)
58	Gul Nawaz Khan, Chaudhri (Gujrat-VIII ― Muslim)
59	Gulzar Muhammad Ali, Begum Dr, M.B.B.S., L.R.C.P., M.R.C.S., D.O.M.S. (London), L.M. (Dublin) (Multan city ― Women Muslim)
60	Habibullah Khan Tiwana, Khan Bahadur Nawabzada Malik (Shahpur-VI ― Muslim)
61	Hadayat Ali, Shaikh, B.A., LL.B. (Sialkot-IX ― Muslim)
62	Haji Shah, Qadri Gilani, Sayad (Montgomery-IX ― Muslim)
63	Hamid Ullah Beg, Mirza (Lahore-III ― Muslim Reserved Seat)
64	Hassan Ali Shah, Saiyad (Montgomery-VII ― Muslim)
65	Iftikhar Hussain Khan, Khan (Corporation of the city of Lahore-I ― Muslim)
66	Inayat Ullah, Chaudhri (Corporation of the city of Lahore-V ― Muslim Reserved Seat)
67	Irshadullah Ranjha, Chaudhri (Gujrat-XI ― Muslim)
68	Jahan Ara Shahnawaz, Begum (Outer Lahore ― Muslim Women)
69	Jalal Din Bhandara, Haji (Montgomery-VIII ― Muslim Reserved Seat)
70	Jamil Hussain Rizvi, Saiyad, B.Sc., LL.B. (Alig) (Gujrat-XII ― Muslim Reserved Seat)
71	Joshua Fazl-ud-Din, Mr, B.A., LL.B. (Pakistani Christian and Anglo-Pakistani-IV)
72	Kala Khan, Sardar (Rawalpindi-IV ― Muslim)
73	Karim Bakhsh, Hafiz, B.A., LL.B. (Muzaffargar-IV ― Muslim)
74	Khadim Hussain, Chaudhri (Sheikhupura-I ― Muslim)
75	Khair Mehdi Khan, Raja (Jhelum-III ― Muslim)
76	Khuda Dad Khan, Raja (Jhelum-II ― Muslim)
77	Khurshid Ahmed Qureshi, Alhaj, Hakim Mian (Shahpur-XI ― Muslim Reserved Seat)
78	Lal Khan, Raja (Rawalpindi-II ― Muslim)
79	Manzoor Hassan, Mian (Gujranwala-I ― Muslim)
80	Manzoor Hussain, Saiyad (Sheikhupur-II ― Muslim)
81	Manzoor-ul-Hassan, Sheikh (Rawalpindi-I ― Muslim)
82	Mehbub Elahi, Shaikh (Lyallpur-I ― Muslim Reserved Seat)
83	Mehdi Ali Khan, Nawabzada Chaudhri (Gujrat-I ― Muslim)
84	Meherban Ahmad, Haji (Corporation of the city of Lahore-IV ― Muslim)
85	Mehtab Khan, Chaudhri (Lahore-II ― Muslim Reserved Seat)
86	Moeen-Azam Khan, Sardar, B.A. (Dera Ghazi Khan-V ― Muslim)
87	Mohy-ud-Din Lal Badshah, Saiyad (Attock-V ― Muslim)
88	Mohy-ud-Din, Maulvi (Lahore-IV ― Muslim Reserved Seat)
89	Mubarik Ali Shah, Major Saiyad (Jhang-IV ― Muslim)
90	Muhammad Abdullah Jat, Chaudhri (Lyallpur-V ― Muslim)
91	Muhammad Abdullah Khan Lt. Col., Raja (Gujranwala-IV ― Muslim)
92	Muhammad Afzal Cheema, Chaudhri, M.A., LL.B. (Lyallpur-IX ― Muslim)
93	Muhammad Afzal Khan, Khan (Mianwali-V ― Muslim)
94	Muhammad Akbar Malik, Mr (Gujranwala-VI ― Muslim)
95	Muhammad Akram Khan Bosan, Khan Bahadur, Haji Malik (Multan-II ― Muslim)
96	Muhammad Akram Khan, Malik, Bar-at-Law (Attock-II ― Muslim)
97	Muhammad Ali, Haji (Sheikhupura-VII ― Muslim)
98	Muhammad Amin Khan Kanju Khan, Mr (Multan-VII ― Muslim)
99	Muhammad Amin, Mr (Corporation of the city of Lahore-II ― Muslim Reserved Seat)
100	Muhammad Amir Khan, Mr (Jhelum-VI ― Muslim)
101	Muhammad Ashraf Alam Khan, Mr (Lyallpur-VI ― Muslim)
102	Muhammad Awais, Chaudhri (Jhelum-I ― Muslim)
103	Muhammad Bakhsh, Haji Mian (Shahpur-II ― Muslim)
104	Muhammad Ghulam Jilani Gurmani, Mian (Muzaffargarh-III ― Muslim)
105	Muhammad Hanif, Chaudhri (Multan-III ― Muslim Reserve Seat)
106	Muhammad Hassan, Chaudhri, B.A., LL.B. (Lyallpur-VII ― Muslim Reserved Seat)
107	Muhammad Hayat Khan, Malik (Attock-VII ― Muslim)
108	Muhammad Iqbal Ahmad Khan, Rai (Montgomery-II ― Muslim Reserved Seat)
109	Muhammad Iqbal Cheema, Chaudhri, B.A., LL.B. (Sialkot-IV ― Muslim)
110	Muhammad Islam-ud-Din, Maulvi (Multan-XIII ― Muslim Reserved Seat)
111	Muhammad Jahangir Khan Langrial, Malik (Montgomery-I ― Muslim)
112	Muhammad Jamal Khan, K.B. Nawab Sardar (Dera Ghazi Khan-I ― Muslim)
113	Muhammad Khan Gishkori, Sardar (Dera Ghazi Khan-VI ― Muslim)
114	Muhammad Khuda Yar Khan Maneka, Mian (Montgomery-X ― Muslim)
115	Muhammad Mehr Shah, Nawab Sir Saiyad (Jhelum-V ― Muslim)
116	Muhammad Mohsin Lali, Mahar, Mr alias Massan (Jhang-VII ― Muslim)
117	Muhammad Munir, Mr (Sialkot-X ― Muslim Reserved Seat)
118	Muhammad Rehmat Hussain Gilani, Makhdumzada Pir Syed (Multan-III ― Muslim)
119	Muhammad Saeed Qureshi, Nawabzada Mian, B.A. (Shahpur-VII ― Muslim)
120	Muhammad Sarfraz Hussain Khan, Malik (Attock-VI ― Muslim)
121	Muhammad Sarfraz Khan, Raja (Jhelum-VI, Muslim)
122	Muhammad Sarwar Bodala, Mian (Montgomery-V ― Muslim Reserved Seat)
123	Muhammad Sarwar Khan, Chaudhri (Sialkot-VIII ― Muslim)
124	Muhammad Shafi, Mian, M.A. (Montgomery-VII ― Muslim Reserved Seat)
125	Muhammad Shafiq, Chaudhri, B.A., LL.B. (Montgomery-III ― Muslim Reserved Seat)
126	Muhammad Wilait Hussain Shah Gilani, Makhdum Alhaj Pir Saiyad (Multan-III ― Muslim)
127	Muhammad Yar Khan, Mr (Multan-XII ― Muslim)
128	Muhammad Yousaf, Chaudhri (Lyallpur-X ― Muslim Reserved Seat)
129	Muhammad Zafarullah, Sardar, B.A., LL.B. (Corporation of the city of Lahore-IV ― Muslim)
130	Muhammad Zakir, Maulvi (Jhang-IX ― Muslim)
131	Muhammad Zaman, Mr (Gujrat-V ― Muslim)
132	Mumtaz Ali Khan, Sardar, B.A., LL.B. (Attock-III ― Muslim)
133	Murid Ahmed, Qazi (Shahpur-IV ― Muslim)
134	Murid Hussain, Saiyad (Sialkot-III ― Muslim)
135	Mushtaq Ahmad Khan, Chaudhri (Lyallpur-X ― Muslim Reserved Seat)
136	Mushtaq Ahmad, Mian, B.A., LL.B. (Corporation of the city of Lahore-III ― Muslim Reserved Seat)
137	Muzaffar Khan, Khan Bahadur Captain Malik (Mianwali-III ― Muslim)
138	Muzaffar Khan, Mr (Attock-I ― Muslim)
139	Nabi Ahmad, Chaudhri (Gujranwala-III ― Muslim)
140	Nasrullah Khan Jatoi, Sardar (Muzaffargar-VII ― Muslim)
141	Nasrullah Khan, Nawabzada (Muzaffargarh-VI ― Muslim)
142	Nasrullah Khan, Rai, B.A. (Lyallpur-XI ― Muslim Reserved Seat)
143	Nasrullah, Chaudhri, B.A., LL.B. (Lahore-II ― Muslim)
144	Naubahar Shah, Saiyad (Multan-XI ― Muslim)
145	Nausher Khan, Rai (Lyallpur-VIII ― Muslim)
146	Nawab Khan Gopang, Haji Sardar (Muzaffargarh-VIII ― Muslim)
147	Nawazish Ali Khan Sial, Khan Saiyad (Jhang-II ― Muslim)
148	Nazar Hussain Shah, Makhdum Saiyad (Lyallpur-XI ― Muslim)
149	Nazar Hussain Shah, Saiyad (Muzaffargarh-I ― Muslim)
150	Noor, Mr M (General)
151	Nur Muhammad, Malik (Montgomery-IV ― Muslim)
152	Qutab Khan, Sardar Bahadur Captain, O.B.I. (Multan-XII ― Muslim Reserved Seat)
153	Rahim Bakhsh Khan, Mr (Multan-X ― Muslim)
154	Rashida Latif, Baji (Muslim Women ― Inner Lahore)
155	Rehan-ud-Din Siddiqui, Mr (Multan-I ― Muslim Reserved Seat)
156	Rehmat Ullah, Mehr, (Montgomery-I, Muslim)
157	Sai Muhammad, Chaudhri (Gujrat-XII ― Muslim)
158	Saif Ullah Tarar, Chaudhri (Gujranwala-VII ― Muslim)
159	Sajjad Ali Khan, Rukan-ud-Daullah, Shamshari Jang Allah, Nawab (Gujranwala-II ― Muslim Reserved Seat)
160	Salah-ud-Din Khan, Chaudhri, B.A., LL.B. (Gujranwala-V ― Muslim)
161	Salehon Muhammad, Mr (Shahpur-I ― Muslim)
162	Salma Tassaduq Hussain, Begum (Muslim Women ― Inner Lahore)
163	Sana Ullah Bodla, Pir (Multan-VIII ― Muslim Reserved Seat)
164	Shah Nawaz Khan, Shaikh (Sialkot-VI ― Muslim)
165	Shah Nawaz, Saiyad, B.A. (Montgomery-V ― Muslim)
166	Shamim Hussain Qadri, Syed, B.A., LL.B. (Corporation of the city of Lahore-III ― Muslim Reserved Seat)
167	Shamsher Ali Kalyar, Alhaj Mian (Shahpur-XI ― Muslim)
168	Sher Jang Khan, Captain (Rawalpindi-VI ― Muslim)
169	Singha, Mrs S.P. (Pakistani Christian and Anglo-Pakistani-I)
170	Sultan Khan, Chaudhri (Attock-IV ― Muslim)
171	Wali Muhammad Bosal, Chaudhri (Gujrat-X ― Muslim)
172	Zafar Ullah Khan, Mr (Multan-IX ― Muslim)
173	Zahoor Hussain Shah, Syed (Multan-VIII ― Muslim)
174	Zeenat Jahan Fida Hasan, Begum (Muslim Women ― Rawalpindi city)

== Aftermath ==
In 1951, after elections in West Punjab, Mumtaz Daultana was chosen as parliamentary leader of the Muslim League in the Punjab Assembly and invited to form a government. Iftikhar Hussain Khan Mamdot became the first Leader of the Opposition in the Provincial Assembly of the Punjab.
