= Abertay Historical Society =

Scottish historical society

The Abertay Historical Society (AHS) is a historical society based in Dundee, Scotland. It aims to promote interest in history, with a special focus on the history of Perthshire, Angus and Fife. The AHS runs a regular programme of public lectures on historical topics and also organises special events. The Society also publishes books, usually producing at least one publication per year.

== History ==
The Society was founded at a meeting held at University College, Dundee on 29 May 1947. The founders were the Principal of University College, Major-General Douglas Wimberley, and the college's history lecturer, Dr Frederick T Wainwright. It has been suggested that the Society was promoted as part of a process of developing 'town and gown links' in Dundee by Wimberley. The AHS was set up with the goal of encouraging the study of local history in the Abertay area (Perthshire, Angus and northern Fife). The Society pursued this aim by organising regular talks and lectures as well as other events such as excursions.

The Society formerly had an Archaeological Section which organised excavations in the local area and its own series of meetings. However, in 1993 the activities of this section came under the control of the Society's Council. For a time in the 1970s the AHS also had an Industrial Archaeology Section, which mainly sought to record the region's industrial heritage. In 2015 the archaeological activities of the Society were taken over by a newly established fieldwork division, which has undertaken projects including the recording of stones that survive from the demolished Dundee Royal Arch.

Since 1953 the Society has published books on local history, the first of which was Dundee and the American Civil War by David Carrie. A number of notable historians and authors have written volumes published by the Society including Bruce Lenman, Andrew Murray Scott and Christopher Whatley. The 51st AHS publication Ten Taysiders: Forgotten Figures from Dundee, Angus and Perthshire was published in 2011 and was edited by members of the Society's Council. In 2011 the AHS began to make copies of out-of-print titles available for free download from their website. The Society's publications are regularly cited in academic literature.

As well as running events, the AHS has undertaken various heritage activities. The Society has lobbied for the preservation of local buildings and historic sites, and played a key role in the creation of Dundee Civic Trust and Dundee Heritage Trust. The Abertay Historical Society was also a benefactor of The McManus: Dundee's Art Gallery and Museum Fundraising Appeal which allowed the restoration and refurbishment of Dundee's main museum and galleries between 2006 and 2009.

A number of notable individuals have been associated with the Abertay Historical Society. These include Sir Francis Mudie who was President of the Society from 1963 to 1965 and also contributed to its publications. Another key figure in the society's history was S. G. Edgar Lythe, a founder member who went on to be Vice Principal of the University of Strathclyde. Lythe, who edited and wrote several of the Society's publications, was credited with moving the AHS away from simply organising events and towards actively encouraging research into local history. The Dundee bibliophile and antiquarian Catherine Kinnear was a founder member of the Society and later went on to be its president.

== Activities ==
The AHS has been described as "one of Scotland's most successful local history organisations". It organises a regular programme of evening lectures, which are usually held in Discovery Point, Dundee, although other venues are also used from time to time. These lectures cover a wide range of topics relating to the local area. The Society also works with other Dundee-based groups to run the Dundee Afternoon Lectures series. The AHS is a registered charity.

Some events are held jointly with other local groups. For example, in 2010 the AHS joined with the Perth Strathspey and Reel Society to have an event at the A. K. Bell Library, Perth entitled "The Fiddle Music of Perth" as part of the Perth 800 celebrations. In 2011 the AHS contributed to the Dundee Science Festival by organising a public lecture on the design and construction of the Bell Rock Lighthouse.

The Society is a partner in Great War Dundee, a project commemorating the First World War, and its impact on Dundee set up to mark the centenary of the conflict.

== Office bearers ==
The Society is run by a council whose membership includes the President, General Secretary, other office bearers and various ordinary members. In addition the Lord Provost of Dundee, the Provost of Perth and Kinross, the Provost of Angus, the Principal of the University of Dundee and the Principal of the University of St Andrews all serve as Honorary Presidents of the Society.

== Relationship with the University of Dundee ==
As noted above the Abertay Historical Society was founded at what was then University College, Dundee by my members of that institution's staff. Since that time the AHS has maintained close links with the institution, which has since 1967 been known as the University of Dundee. The Principal of the University of Dundee is one five Honorary Presidents of the Society, and many of the Society's members and office-holders, including past presidents, have been University staff and students. Equally many of its publications have been authored by figures connected with the university and the AHS' lecture programme has offers University staff and students the chance to present their research to the local community.

An annual prize is awarded by the AHS to the undergraduate at the University of Dundee who produces the dissertation which makes the most significant contribution to local history. Some of these dissertations have been expanded and published by the AHS. For example, the AHS publication No. 44 Scottish Cowboys and the Dundee Investors by Claire E. Swan evolved from a dissertation which won the Abertay History Prize in 2003. Julie Danskin, author of the Society's 54th publication is also a past winner of the Abertay History Prize.

The archives of the AHS are held by Archive Services at the University of Dundee.

Currently most of the Society's lectures are held at the university, usually in the Dalhousie Building.

== Publications ==
The first publication by the society was Dundee and the American Civil War which was published in 1953 and was written by one of the Society's members, David Carrie. An editorial note in the publication announced that it was hoped, if finances allowed, that it would to 'be followed by others of similar character, produced to a uniform size to simplify binding into convenient volumes'. It was also stated that while its publications would 'always have a strong local flavour the Society aims to avoid undue parochialism and seeks to set its studies against the wide backcloth of general historical development'. As of December 2015 the Society has published a further 55 books relating to the history of Tayside and Fife. Members of the Society are sent a free copy of each new publication, while other copies are made available for sale either from the Society or via booksellers. The publications have covered a wide number of topics and have varied in style. While most are monographs some titles have been collections of essays written by various authors. An example of the latter is the 2011 publication Ten Taysiders which featured biographical essays on ten historic figures from Dundee, Perthshire and Angus, such as Mary Ann Baxter, A.K. Bell and William Sharpey and which was written by various authors including Steve Connelly, Fiona Scharlau, Charles Waterston, Graham Lowe, John MacEwen, John Kerr, William Kenefick and Kenneth Baxter.

The following books have been published by the AHS:

- No 1. Carrie, D.C., Dundee and the American Civil War, 1861-65 (1953)
- No 2. Turner, W.H.K., The Textile Industry of Arbroath since the early 18th century (1954)
- No 3. Walker, D.M., Architects and Architecture in Dundee, 1770-1914 (1955)
- No 4. Urquhart, E.A., Castle Huntly: its Development and History (1956)
- No 5. Lythe, S.G.E., Life and Labour in Dundee from the Reformation to the Civil War (1958)
- No 6. Carnie, R.H., Publishing in Perth before 1807(1960)
- No 7. Baxter, J.H., Dundee and the Reformation (1960)
- No 8. McNeill, W.A., Montrose before 1700: from original documents(1961)
- No 9. Mudie, Sir Francis & Walker, D. M., Mains Castle and the Grahams of Fintry (1964)
- No 10. Lythe, S.G.E., Courlays of Dundee: the Rise and Fall of a Scottish Shipbuilding Firm (1964)
- No 11. Wilson, E.M. (ed.) Aspects of antiquity a miscellany by members of the Archaeological Section of the Abertay Historical Society (1966)
- No 12. Doughty, D.W., The Tullis Press, Cupar, 1803-49 (1967)
- No 13. Lythe, S.G.E., Ward, J.T. & Southgate, D.G., Three Dundonians (1968)
- No 14. Lenman, B., Lythe, C. & Gauldie, E. Dundee and its Textile Industry, 1850-1914 (1969)
- No 15. Mudie, Sir Francis, Walker, D. M. & McIvor, I., Broughty Castle and the Defence of the Tay (1970)
- No 16. Duncan, A.A.M. (ed.), Scots Antiquaries and Historians: Papers read at the Silver Jubilee Conference of the Abertay Historical Society, 15 April 1972 (1972)
- No 17. Carstairs, A. M. The Tayside Industrial population 1911-1951 (1974)
- No 18. Walker, D.M., Architects and Architecture in Dundee, 1770-1914 (1977) - a reprint and expansion of publication number 3
- No 19. Smith, J.V., The Watt Institution, Dundee, 1824-49 (1978)
- No 20. Brown, W., Early Days in a Dundee Mill, 1819-1823: Extracts from the Diary of William Brown, an Early Dundee Spinner, edited by John Hume (1978)
- No 21. Haldane, A.R.B., The Great Fishmonger of the Tay: John Richardson of Perth & Pitfour 1760-1821 (1981)
- No 22. Whatley, C.A., That Important and Necessary Article: the Salt Industry and its Trade in Fife and Tayside c. 1570-1850 (1984)
- No 23. Hay, E. R., Focus on fishing Arbroath & Gourdon (1985)
- No 24. Dingwall, C.H., Ardler: a Village History: the Planned Railway Village of Washington (1985)
- No 25. Withers, C.W.J., Highland Communities in Dundee and Perth 1787-1891: a Study in the Social History of Migrant Highlanders (1986)
- No 26. Smith, A.M., The Three United Trades of Dundee: Masons, Wrights and Slaters (1987)
- No 27. Cameron, K.J., The Schoolmaster Engineer: Adam Anderson of Perth and St Andrews, c.1780-1846 (1988)
- No 28. Gauldie, E., One Artful and Ambitious Individual: Alexander Riddoch (1989)
- No 29. Taylor, D.B., Circular Homesteads in North West Perthshire (1990)
- No 30. Torrie, E.P.D., Medieval Dundee: a Town and its People (1990)
- No 31. Jackson, G., Kinnear, K., The Trade and Shipping of Dundee, 1780-1850 (1991)
- No 32. Whatley, C.A., (ed.), The Remaking of Juteopolis: Dundee 1891-1991 (1992)
- No 33. Leneman, L., Martyrs in our Midst: Dundee, Perth and the Forcible Feeding of Suffragettes (1993)
- No 34. McCraw, I., The Fairs of Dundee (1994)
- No 35. Smith, A.M., The Nine Trades of Dundee(1995)
- No 36. Robertson, S., Young, P., Daughter of Atholl: Lady Evelyn Stewart Murray, 1868-1940 (1996)
- No 37. St. John, M., The Demands of the People: Dundee Radicalism 1850-1870 (1997)
- No 38. Mathew, W.M., Keiller's of Dundee: The Rise of the Marmalade Dynasty 1800-1879 (1998)
- No 39. Walsh, L., Patrons, Poverty and Profit: Organized Charity in Nineteenth-century Dundee (2000)
- No 40. Howe, S., William Low & Co.: a Family Business History (2000)
- No 41. McCraw, I., Victorian Dundee at Worship (2002)
- No 42. Scott, A.M., Dundee's Literary Lives: Vol. 1: Fifteenth to Nineteenth Century (2003)
- No 43. Scott, A.M., Dundee's Literary Lives: Vol. 2: Twentieth Century(2003)
- No 44. Swan, C.E., Scottish Cowboys and the Dundee Investors (2004)
- No 45. Smith, A.M., The Guildry of Dundee: a History of the Merchant Guild of Dundee up to the 19th Century (2005)
- No 46. Verschuur, M., A Noble and Potent Lady: Katherine Campbell, Countess of Crawford (2006)
- No 47. Cameron, K.J., The Schoolmaster Engineer: Adam Anderson of Perth and St Andrews, c.1780-1846 (2007)
- No 48. Browne, S.F., Making the Vote Count: the Arbroath Women Citizens Association, 1931-1945 (2007)
- No 49. Petrie, A., The 1915 Rent Strikes: an East Coast Perspective (2008)
- No 50. Mudie, Sir Francis, Walker, D. M., McIvor, I., Broughty Castle and the Defence of the Tay (2010)
- No 51. Various, Ten Taysiders: Forgotten Figures from Dundee, Angus and Perthshire (with an introduction by Billy Kay) (2011)
- No 52. Keracher, S., Dundee's Two Intrepid Ladies: A Tour Round the World by D C Thomson's Female Journalists in 1894 (2012)
- No 53. Davidson, F., Glen Clova through the Ages: a Short Guide to the History of an Angus Glen (2013)
- No 54. Danskin, J. S., A City at War The 4th Black Watch Dundee's Own (2013)
- No 55. Rice, Catherine, "All their Good Friends and Neighbours" The story of a vanished hamlet in Angus (2014)
- No 56. Jarron, Matthew, "Independent & Individualist" Art in Dundee 1867-1924 (2015)
- No 57. Dundas, Jean, & Orr, David, (eds.), "Quite Happy" The Diary of James Fyffe, Cattle Dealer 1836-1840 (2016)
- No 58. Jarron, Matthew, Caudwell, Cathy and Pierce Owen, Meic, Growing and Forming – Essays on D’Arcy Thompson (2017)
- No 59. Kenefick, Billy and Patrick, Derek (eds.), Tayside at War (2018)
- No 60. Bannerman, Gordon, Baxter, Kenneth, Cook, Daniel and Jarron, Matthew, Creatures of Fancy – Mary Shelley in Dundee (2019)

The Society has undertaken a programme of making digital versions of some of its out of print publications available for free download from its website.
