= Naseer Ahmad Faruqui =

Naseer Ahmad Faruqui OBE, SPk, HQA (15 December 1906 – 5 December 1991) was a prominent civil servant of Pakistan and prior to that in British India.

He was son of Dr Basharat Ahmad, a medical officer in government service and a prominent scholar and writer of the Lahore Ahmadiyya Movement, who wrote the most comprehensive biography of Mirza Ghulam Ahmad entitled Mujaddid-i Azam.Educated at Govt. College Lahore he joined the elite Indian Civil Service in 1931 and served in the Bombay Presidency and Sindh. First as the senior district officer at Surat and Nasik, then as under-secretary Govt. of Bombay and Govt. of India, then as collector of Thana, Bombay and Karachi and finally as the official secretary to the governor of Sind.

He continued in the service of the Government of Pakistan after the independence of Pakistan in 1947 serving as the secretary to both the Governments of Sindh and West Punjab and finishing his distinguished career as principal secretary to the president.

He subsequently served as Chief Election Commissioner of Pakistan.

In 1946 he was Deputy Commissioner of Karachi. (See in this connection the episode with Sir Francis Mudie, Governor of Sindh.) Later, as Chief Secretary to the government of Pakistan (East & West), he played an important role in the transfer of the capital from Karachi to Islamabad.

In the mid-1960s, Mr. Faruqui was made the first chairman of the Capital Development Authority, the local government body for Islamabad. He also held the posts of Cabinet Secretary, Principal Secretary to President Ayub Khan, retiring as Chief Election Commissioner of Pakistan.

Mr. Faruqui is also known for his association with the Lahore Ahmadiyya Movement. He has numerous article and publications to his credit. He was also highly regarded for his scholarly lectures on the Qur'an

Prominent Publications by Naseer Ahmad Faruqui:

- Ahmadiyyat in the Service of Islam
- Ahmadiyyat vs. Qadianiyyat
- Islam and Christianity
