= Chaudhry Khaliquzzaman =

Pakistani politician (1889–1973)

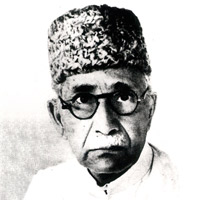
- Chaudhry Khaliquzzaman

President of Muslim League (Pakistan)
- In office 1948–1950

Governor of East Bengal
- In office 31 March 1953 – 15 May 1954
- Governor General: Malik Ghulam Muhammad
- Prime Minister: Khwaja Nazimuddin (1953); Mohammad Ali Bogra (1953–54)
- Chief Ministers: Sir Muhammed Nurul Ameen Sir Sher-E-Bangla Qazi Abul Qasheem Fazlul Hauque
- Preceded by: Sir Feroze Khan Noon
- Succeeded by: Iskander Ali Mirza

Diplomat to Indonesia and Philippines
- In office 1954–unknown

Personal details
- Born: 25 December 1889 Chunar, United Province, British India (present day Uttar Pradesh, India)
- Died: 18 May 1973 (aged 83)
- Party: Convention Muslim League; Muslim League; All-India Muslim League

Chaudhry Khaliquzzaman (Urdu: چودھری خلیق الزمان) (25 December 1889 – 18 May 1973) was a Pakistani politician and Muslim figurehead during British India. He was one of the top leaders of the All India Muslim League.

== Early life and career ==
He was born in Chunar, an ancient town in UP's Mirzapur district in the United Provinces (now Uttar Pradesh). At the time, his father, Chaudhry Muhammad Zaman, was a revenue officer. His younger brother, Salimuzzaman Siddiqui (1897 – 1994) was a scientist and researcher in both British India and later in Pakistan.

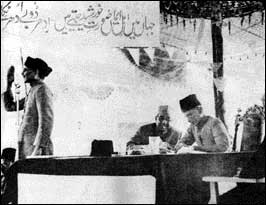
Chaudhry Khaliquzzaman seconding the Lahore resolution with Muhammad Ali Jinnah chairing the Lahore session in March 1940

Chaudhry Khaliquzzaman was not only a Muslim League leader, he was also one of the founding fathers of Pakistan. At the time of Pakistan’s independence on 14 August 1947, he was still serving as the Muslim League member of the Constituent Assembly of India and remained there to address the Assembly. He was one of the four individuals who addressed the Constituent Assembly of India in the central hall of Parliament during the moment of Indian independence at midnight of 14 August 1947. The other three were Jawaharlal Nehru, Dr. Rajendra Prasad and Dr. Radhakrishnan. He migrated to newly created Pakistan in November 1947. He was appointed the chief organizer of Muslim League (Pakistan). Later he served as the first president of the Muslim League (Pakistan).

=== Career positions in Pakistan ===
- President of Muslim League (Pakistan) (1948 – 1950)
- Governor of East Pakistan (April 1953 – May 1954)
- Ambassador of Pakistan to Indonesia and the Philippines (1954)

In 1961, he published his memoirs entitled Pathway to Pakistan. The Urdu version of the autobiography came out in 1967. It is entitled Shahrahay Pakistan. This book is considered by many as a rare 'treasure house' of information on the Pakistan Movement. In this book, he wrote: "The two-nation theory, which we had used in the fight for Pakistan had created not only bad blood against the Muslims of the minority provinces, but also an ideological wedge between them and the Hindus of India." He further wrote: "Mr Jinnah himself realized the grave dangers to Muslims who after the partition were to be left in India. I remember that on 1 August 1947, a few days before his final departure for Karachi, Mr Jinnah called the Muslim members of the Constituent Assembly of India to his house at 10 Aurangzeb Road to bid farewell to them.

"Mr. Rizwanullah put some awkward questions concerning the position of Muslims, who would be left over in India, their status and their future. I had never before found Mr. Jinnah so disconcerted as on that occasion, probably because he was realizing then quite vividly what was immediately in store for the Muslims. Finding the situation awkward, I asked my friends and colleagues to end the discussion. I believe as a result of our farewell meeting, Mr. Jinnah took the earliest opportunity to bid goodbye to his two-nation theory in his speech on 11 August 1947 as the governor general-designate and President of the constituent assembly of Pakistan."

"He (Huseyn Shaheed Suhrawardy) doubted the utility of the two-nation theory, which to my mind also had never paid any dividends to us. But after the partition, it proved positively injurious to the Muslims of India, and on a long-view basis for Muslims everywhere." According to him, Jinnah bade farewell to it in his famous speech of 11 August 1947.

He was one of the most active leaders of Pakistan movement. He seconded the Lahore Resolution, which was presented by Sher-i-Bengal A. K. Fazlul Huq in March 1940 to create Pakistan.

== Commemorative postage stamp ==
In 1990, Pakistan Post office issued a commemorative postage stamp in his honour in its 'Pioneers of Freedom' series.

Political offices
| Preceded by Feroz Khan Noon | Governor of East Bengal; 31 March 1953 – May 29, 1954 | Succeeded by Iskandar Mirza |
