= Abdur Rab Nishtar =

Pakistani independence activist and politician (1899–1958)

Sardar Abdur Rab Nishtar
- سردار عبدالرب نشتر
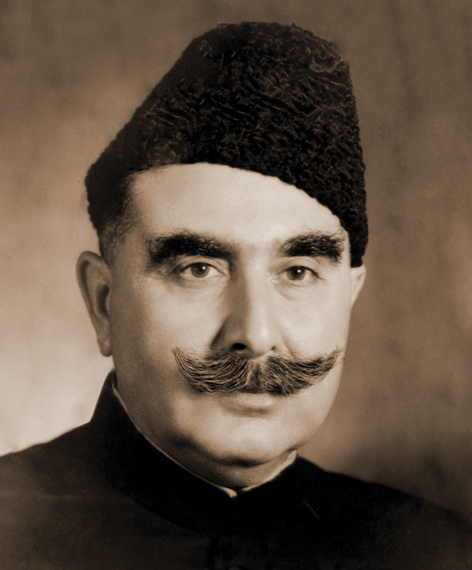
- Nishtar's official portrait

2nd Governor of West Punjab
- In office 2 August 1949 – 24 November 1951
- Monarch: George VI
- Governors-General: Khawaja Nazimuddin; Malik Ghulam Muhammad
- Chief Minister: Iftikhar Hussain Khan; Mumtaz Daultana
- Preceded by: Francis Mudie
- Succeeded by: I. I. Chundrigar

1st Minister of Communications
- In office 15 August 1947 – 1 August 1949
- Monarch: George VI
- Governors-General: Muhammad Ali Jinnah; Khawaja Nazimuddin
- Prime Minister: Liaquat Ali Khan
- Preceded by: Office established
- Succeeded by: Sardar Bahadur Khan

Personal details
- Born: 13 June 1899 Peshawar, British India (present-day Khyber Pakhtunkhwa, Pakistan)
- Died: 14 February 1958 (aged 58) Karachi, Federal Capital Territory, Pakistan (present-day Sindh, Pakistan)
- Resting place: Mazar-e-Quaid
- Party: Muslim League (after independence); All India Muslim League (before independence)
- Education: Edwardes College
- Alma mater: University of the Punjab (B.A); Aligarh Muslim University (L.L.B)
- Occupation: Politician

Sardar Abdur Rab Nishtar (13 June 1899 – 14 February 1958) was a Pakistani independence activist and politician from the North-West Frontier Province (present-day Khyber Pakhtunkhwa). He served as the first Minister of Communications of Pakistan from August 1947 to August 1949 and then as the second Governor of West Punjab from August 1949 to November 1951.

== Early life and education ==
Abdul Rab Nishtar was born on 13 June 1899 into a religious household in Peshawar, British India. His father, Maulvi Abdul Hannan was a prominent figure from the Pashtun Kakar tribe that had fiercely opposed the British rule in South Asia.

Nishtar's ancestors hailed from Zhob, district in north Balochistan but had later settled in Peshawar. He completed his early education in a Christian mission school named Edwardes High School Kohati Gate Peshawar and later Sanathan Dharam High School in Bombay, (now 'Mumbai' in India). He eventually graduated from the Edwardes College in Peshawar and then later on completed his Bachelor of Arts degree from the Punjab University, Lahore in 1923. He later went to Aligarh and received an LL.B degree with honours from Aligarh Muslim University in 1925.

== Political career ==
A man of deep religious convictions, he also had a deep interest in Islamic mysticism, a fact which probably reflects the influence of his parents and also his associate Maulana Muhammad Ali Jauhar. From 1919 to 1920, both of them actively participated in the Khilafat Movement. Later, Sardar Abdur Rab Nishtar remained member of Indian National Congress from 1927 to 1931, was elected Municipal Commissioner, Peshawar Municipal committee, successively from 1929 to 1938, joined All-India Muslim League, became a confidante of Pakistan's founder Muhammad Ali Jinnah. From 1932 to 1936, Nishtar was a member of All-India Muslim League (AIML) Council, member NWFP (North-West Frontier Province) legislative assembly from 1937 to 1945, Finance Minister NWFP 1943–45, member AIML Working Committee, 1944–1947, and represented the All India Muslim League at the Simla Conference in 1945.

Abdur Rab Nishtar was ousted from provincial politics through the political maneuvers of a rival political leader Abdul Qayyum Khan in 1946. Abdul Qayyum Khan was an outcast from the Indian National Congress, who then vigorously opposed that political party after his ouster from it, especially he was against the union of the Indian subcontinent in a single country and was working for the creation of an independent Muslim state.

== As Federal Minister ==
After the Dominion of Pakistan was created, Nishtar was appointed Minister for communication in Pakistan and served in that position from 1947 to 1949. He introduced the use of Urdu language in Pakistan Railways and Pakistan Post Office. After the dismissal of the Punjab Provincial government in 1949, Sardar Nishtar was appointed Governor of Punjab (the first Pakistani governor in Pakistan's history, till that time the British government had still continued governing with previous English Governors). He effectively ran the Governorship for two years paving the way for restoration of an elected government in 1951.

== Nomination for Prime Minister ==
Nishtar was considered a serious contender for the post of Prime Minister after Liaqat Ali Khan's assassination. His appointment was blocked by senior secularists and liberal officials including the future President Iskander Mirza because of Nishtar's conservative and Islamic views.

== Opposition Leader ==
He subsequently fell out with the government over the dismissal of Prime minister Khawaja Nazimuddin's government by Governor General Ghulam Muhammad. Refusing to be involved in what he perceived as an undemocratic act, Nishtar went into opposition. In 1956, when the first Pakistani constitution was adopted, Sardar Abdur Rab Nishtar was elected president of the Muslim League against the wishes of President Iskandar Mirza and then prime minister Chaudhry Mohammad Ali who were backing Dr. Khan Sahib from the Republican Party as West Pakistan chief minister while Nishtar wanted a Muslim League man for the office. But a big majority of the League leaders, including Nawab Mushtaq Ahmad Gurmani and Mumtaz Daultana, supported Iskander Mirza.

== Leader of Muslim League ==
He subsequently took over the leadership of the Muslim League party and the League was expected to do well in West Pakistan in the planned 1959 elections but unfortunately he died before that. He served as president, Pakistan Muslim League from 1956 to 1958.

== Commemorative postage stamp ==
Pakistan Post Office issued a commemorative postage stamp in his honor in its 'Pioneers of Freedom' series in 1990.

== Death and legacy ==
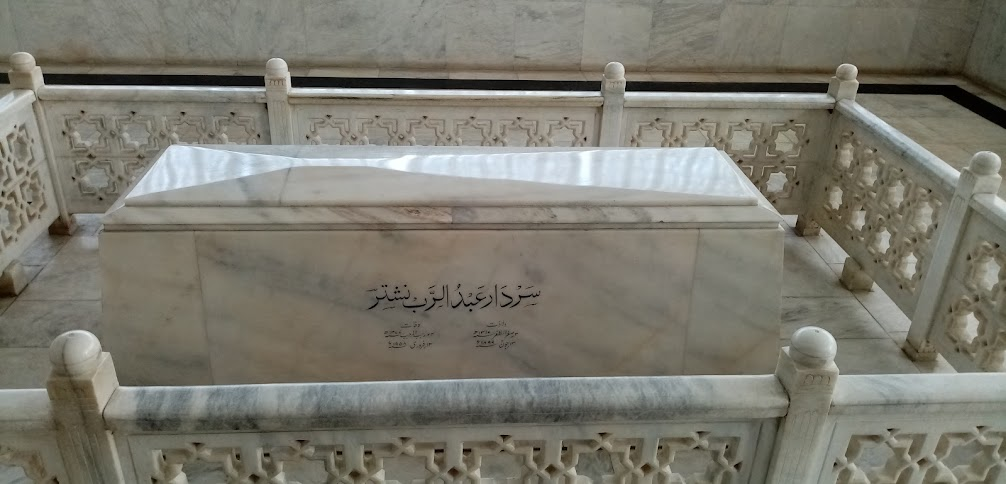
Sardar Abdur Rab Nishtar Tomb

Abdur Rab Nishtar died of a heart attack on 14 February 1958 in Karachi. He had been suffering from heart disease and high blood pressure since 1953. Nishtar Medical College, Nishtar Hospital in the city of Multan and Nishtar Hall Peshawar are named in his honor. Nishtar Park and Nishtar Road in Karachi are named after him. He was buried at Mazar-e-Quaid near the Tomb of Muhammad Ali Jinnah, the founding father of Pakistan to acknowledge his services in the cause of Pakistan. Abdul Rab Nishtar had a reputation of being a sincere political leader and a man of amicable nature. With his political activities, he contributed greatly to All-India Muslim League and the Muslims living in the Indian subcontinent, creating political consciousness and Islamic spirit among them.

Abdul Rab Nishtar was a close friend of both Maulana Muhammad Ali Jauhar and Maulana Shaukat Ali. At one point during their association, Muhammad Ali Jauhar had told Nishtar that he opposed Jinnah for re-organization of the All-India Muslim League. After finding out all the details of Jinnah-Jauhar discussion, Nishtar decided to support Jinnah's proposal and even succeeded in convincing Jauhar to do the same.

Sardar Abdur Rab Nishtar's younger brother Sardar Abdul Ghayur was a senior diplomat who served as Pakistan's ambassador in numerous countries. Safwat Ghayur (Shaheed) the widely respected and venerated AIGP (police) officer who was martyred in the line of duty was a nephew of Nishtar. General Abdul Waheed Kakar former Chief of Army Staff (Pakistan) is another nephew of Nishtar. Senior political leader, chairman of Qaumi Watan Party, former chief minister of Khyber Pakhtunkhwa and former interior minister Aftab Ahmad Khan Sherpao was son in law to Nishtar.

His eldest son Jamil Nishtar was a renowned banker, another was Prominent physician Professor Dr Tariq Nishtar, and youngest one died at the age 29 and was an engineer. Abdur Rab Nishtar's grandson is married to Dr. Sania Nishtar, who was the special assistant on poverty alleviation and social safety to Prime Minister Imran Khan.

== Bibliography ==
Syed Mujawar Hussain Shah, Sardar Abdur Rab Nishtar: A Political Biography (Lahore, Qadiria Books, 1985).

Political offices
Preceded by Francis Mudie	Governor of Punjab; 1949–1951	Succeeded by I.I. Chundrigar
