= Jinnah Muslim League =

Defunct political party in Pakistan

Jinnah Muslim League جناح مسلم لیگ
- Leader: Iftikhar Hussain Khan Mamdot
- Founded: 1949
- Dissolved: 1953
- Split from: Muslim League
- Ideology: Pakistani nationalism
- National affiliation: All-Pakistan Awami League (From 1950 onwards)

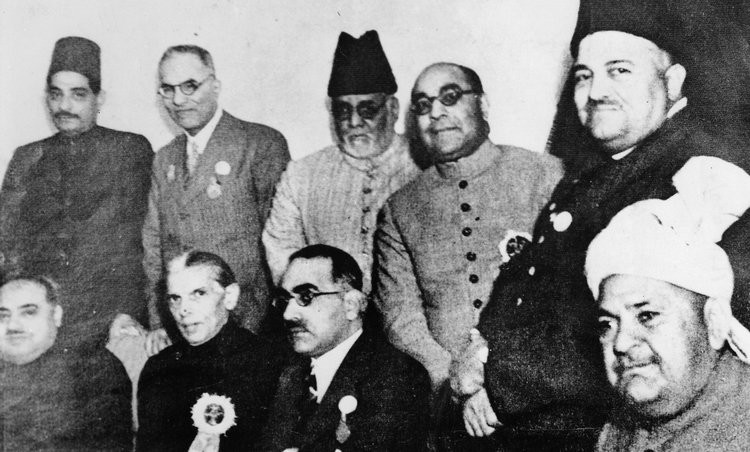
Iftikhar Hussain Khan Mamdot seen in the bottom row, third to the left sitting on the right of Muhammad Ali Jinnah.

The Jinnah Muslim League (JML) was a Pakistani political party founded in 1949 as a breakaway faction of the Muslim League by the first ever Chief Minister of Pakistani Punjab, Iftikhar Hussain Khan Mamdot. The party's founder, Mamdot was a close confidant and ally of Muhammad Ali Jinnah, the founder of Pakistan. Mamdot played a key role in the Pakistan Movement and therefore was granted the position of the first chief minister of West Punjab following the Independence of Pakistan. He retained the position of chief minister until he was sacked by the ruling Muslim League in 1949 after Jinnah's death due to issues in Mamdot's provincial government and because of Mamdot's relations with Muslim League top leaders worsening after Jinnah's death.

Following this, Mamdot left the Muslim League to found the Jinnah Muslim League between 1949 and 1950. The party's ideology was not clear, as Mamdot was the only prominent leader in the party. Mamdot himself would be a stern disciplinarian. He advocated for the policies of his Punjab provincial ministry (1947–1949) and was a close advocate of Jinnah's. The party was founded to also contest against Mamdot's arch-rival, Mumtaz Daultana of the Muslim League. The party joined hands with Hussein Shaheed Suhrawardy and his Awami League and formed the All-Pakistan Awami League to contest in the 1951 Punjab provincial election, Punjab's first election. The Muslim League defeated Mamdot and the Awami League coalition, following this, Mamdot became Leader of the Opposition in the Provincial Assembly of the Punjab under the JML. The JML did not dissolve until 1953, when Mamdot quit and rejoined the Muslim League, while the All-Pakistan Awami League remained a party until the creation of Bangladesh.
