= Luddan =

Luddan لُڈّن
- City
- Location within Punjab, Pakistan Location within Pakistan
- Coordinates: 29°53′46″N 72°33′31″E
- Country: Pakistan
- Province: Punjab
- District: Vehari District

Luddan (Urdu: لُڈّن), is a town located on the bank of the Sutlej in Vehari District, Punjab, Pakistan. It is about 27 km (17 mi) away from the city of Vehari and 24 km away from Hasilpur. Luddan is a rich agricultural area, with cotton, maize, rice, tobacco and sugarcane being major crops. Mumtaz Daultana, former Chief Minister of Punjab (1951-1953) was born here.

Doltana (or Daulatana) family of Luddan was the forefront in the Pakistan Movement.

The main tribes of Luddan are Kamlana,Rajana,Sukhera, Kharal, Arain, Haroon zain, Lakhwera, Daultana, Joiyas, Sargana, Gazar, Taili, Khokhar, Tajwana, Tawana, Dhuddy, Machi, Sahbzaada, Meo, Channar, Bhatti, and Souroo.
