= Amin ul-Hasanat =

Pakistani Islamic leader (1922–1960)

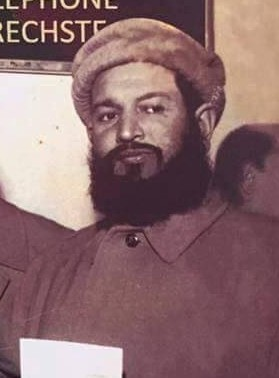

Personal life
- Born: Amin ul-Hasanat; 1 February 1922 Manki Sharif, Nowshera, British India (now Pakistan)
- Died: 5 January 1960 (aged 37)
- Parent: Pir Abdul Rauf (father)
- Known for: Campaigning for NWFP to become part of Pakistan
- Other names: Pir of Manki Sharif, Fateh-e-Referendum
- Occupation: Islamic religious leader, politician

Religious life
- Religion: Islam

Amin ul-Hasanat (1 February 1922 – 5 January 1960), better known as the Pir of Manki Sharif, was the son of Pir Abdul Rauf and an Islamic religious leader in the North-West Frontier Province (NWFP) of British India (now Pakistan). After joining the All-India Muslim League in 1945, he was noted for his campaign in the provincial referendum held in early part of 1947, that saw the NWFP become part of Pakistan rather than India. He was popularly known as ''Fateh-e-Referendum''.

== Muslim League ==
Amin ul-Hasanat was highly influenced and inspired by the Pakistan Resolution of March 1940 passed by the All-India Muslim League at Lahore. Soon after joining the All-India Muslim League in 1945, Hasanat toured the NWFP to win support for the Muslim League. On October 1, 1945, Hasanat organized a historic meeting of the Ulema and Mashaikh at Peshawar, which passed resolutions expressing full loyalty with the Muslim League and also expressed complete confidence in Jinnah's leadership. Then he invited the Muslim League leader Mohammad Ali Jinnah to tour the Province which Jinnah did on 24 November 1945. Jinnah's visit boosted the morale of the Pir and his devoted followers. The Pir's vigorous campaign for the Pakistan Movement in the NWFP area contributed significantly to the Muslim League's success in the NWFP referendum held in early part of 1947. The success of the Muslim League in the referendum was the basis for the British government to allocate NWFP to Pakistan.

In one of Jinnah's letters to the Pir, Jinnah promised that the sharia law would be applied to the affairs of the Muslim community after the formation of Pakistan.

== Opposition ==
After the independence of Pakistan in 1947, however, the Pir of Manki Sharif was disappointed by some of the decisions made by the party. He cut-off his relations with the Muslim League due to his ideological differences with Khan Abdul Qayyum Khan, who emerged as the first Muslim League premier in NWFP. The Pir decided to launch his own Awami Muslim League party that started to play the role of opposition in the NWFP Provincial Assembly. His view was that opposition was the spirit of democratic set up and that it was critical to attain the previously stated objectives of the Muslim League. After he saw new local leadership emerge in the province, he felt that those ideals were being overlooked by the changed Muslim League leadership. Disillusioned, he retired from active politics in 1955 and went back to religious activities.

== Commemorative postage stamp ==
Pakistan Post Office issued a commemorative postage stamp to honor him in its 'Pioneers of Freedom' series in 1990.

== Death ==
He died on 28 January 1960, at age 37, a few weeks after a car accident on 5 January 1960 near Fateh Jang, Attock District in Punjab, Pakistan. He was buried at his hometown Manki Sharif, Nowshera District, NWFP, Pakistan.

== See also ==
- Abdur Rab Nishtar
- Muhammad Karam Shah al-Azhari
