= Francis Mudie =

British civil servant (1890–1976)

Sir Robert Francis Mudie KCSI, KCIE, OBE

1st Governor of West Punjab
- In office 15 August 1947 – 2 August 1949
- Monarch: George VI
- Governors-General: Muhammad Ali Jinnah; Khawaja Nazimuddin
- Preceded by: Office established
- Succeeded by: Sardar Abdur Rab Nishtar

Governor of British Sind
- In office 15 January 1946 – 13 August 1947
- Monarch: George VI
- Preceded by: Sir Hugh Dow
- Succeeded by: Shaikh G.H. Hidayatullah (as Governor of Sind in Pakistan)

Personal details
- Born: 24 August 1890 Broughty Ferry, Scotland
- Died: 15 September 1976 (aged 86) Broughty Ferry, Scotland
- Education: King's College, Cambridge
- Nickname: Frank

Sir Robert Francis Mudie KCSI, KCIE, OBE (24 August 1890 – 15 September 1976) was a British civil servant and a member of the Imperial Civil Service during the British Raj. He was the last British colonial-era governor of Sind and after the partition of British India in August 1947, he served as the first governor of West Punjab in the Dominion of Pakistan.

== Education and early career ==
=== Education ===
Robert Francis Mudie attended Seafield House in Broughty Ferry. George Cunningham and Rob Lockhart attended the same school and were to meet again in India. From Seafield house, he went on a scholarship to Fettes College, Edinburgh, and later on a mathematical scholarship to King's College, Cambridge. In 1911 he graduated as a wrangler.

=== Early career ===
After graduation Robert Francis Mudie spent a term as assistant master at Clifton College before commencing as assistant master at Eton College. After only four terms, he came to the conclusion that he had no interest in school mastering and after a six-month break he started studying for entrance examinations to join the Indian Civil Service (ICS).

=== First World War ===
ICS examinations started on 2 August 1914, two days before the war broke out.

Robert Francis Mudie had previously been a sergeant in the Officer Training Corps at Cambridge, and immediately applied for a commission. He was gazetted on 26 August to the 6th (City of London) battalion, The London Regiment (Rifles), but was given permission to join two weeks later allowing him to complete the ICS entrance examinations.

A number of successful ICS candidates had joined the army before the examination results came out, and the War Office decided that successful candidates should be sent to India as soldiers and could join the service provided that within a year they had passed health, riding and language examinations. Robert Francis Mudie, one of the successful candidates, was tasked with becoming proficient in Bengali.

Mudie was transferred first to the Royal Welch Fusiliers, then to a territorial division before joining the 2/4th battalion Somerset Light Infantry which was sent to India. The battalion sailed on the troop ship Saturnia, arriving in Bombay in the first week of January 1915. From Bombay the battalion was posted to Bangalore, where Mudie's company was detached to Malappuram and Mudie was sent with a platoon to Calicut, under the command of Raibert McDougall. In India the first British official he met was Charles Innes who was at the time district collector in Calicut and later became Governor of Burma.

Since he needed to learn Bengali, after two months he was reassigned to the 1/10th battalion Middlesex regiment in Calcutta. He did not fit in with the regiment and requested a transfer, so four months later he was assigned to 10th Gurkha Rifles in Maymao. Later he was reassigned to the 16th Rajputs (The Lucknow Regiment) in Calcutta. After a temporary assignment to the 89th Punjabis he returned to Calcutta to join the 127th Baluchis. In 1917 he was sent for musketry training at Satara where he remained on the musketry staff until the end of the war. By this point he had been commissioned into the Indian Army Reserve of Officers and held the rank of Captain

== Indian Civil Service ==
=== Acceptance into the Indian Civil Service ===
To enter the ICS, Robert Francis Mudie had been required to pass a medical, learn Bengali and to ride a horse. At Saturna where there was no horse, he passed the equestrian proficiency test by answering the question "Would you jump that cactus hedge?" with the answer "no".

However he failed a medical examination, so he wrote to John Kerr, the Chief Secretary of Bengal, saying "...all I had to do in the ICS is to live in the country, so I would like to know what I am to die of and how soon, and could I now go to the War." John Kerr sent for him and after seeing that he was not immediately going to die, ordered a medical re-examination which he passed.

Mudie had also failed to master Bengali, instead passing the proficiency test in Urdu, the preferred language for the army. Mudie's request for a transfer from Bengal to United Provinces was initially turned down as impossible. But Rudman, Additional Under-Secretary in the Home Department of the Government of India and a fellow student from King's College, took him to meet Sir Tennant Sloan, Under Secretary in the Home Department, who in turn took him to meet the Deputy Secretary, Mackworth Young. Two weeks later Mudie was transferred to United Provinces where he started his ICS career.

=== District work ===
Between 1919 and 1930 he served in various positions gaining a reputation for "vigorous personality and good sense".

- Jhansi – Assistant Magistrate
- Benares – Joint Magistrate
- Dehra Dun – Income Tax Officer
- Agra – Assistant District Magistrate and Collector
- Sultanpur – Deputy Commissioner
- Pratapgarh – Settlement Officer
- Farrukhabad – Collector, 1926
- Agra – Settlement Officer, 1926–1929

=== Indian Round Table Conference in London 1930-1931 ===
While on leave, Mudie was appointed one of the secretaries to the first Indian Round Table Conference held in London.

=== Allahabad, Collector ===
After the conference Mudie returned to India and was appointed Collector in Allahabad.

At the time the Congress party headquarters was in Allahabad, where Jawaharlal Nehru and his family lived very near the Collector's bungalow.

C.Y. Chintamani, one of the Indian Liberals and a strong Nationalist, also lived in Allahabad at this time.

=== Cownpore, Collector ===
Mudie was posted as Collector to Bulandshahr, but in March 1932, Mudie was appointed Collector in Cownpore, a post he held until April 1936.

=== Railway Board, Delhi ===
In 1936, Mudie was posted as Officer on Special Duty with the Government of India to form the Railway Board, as defined in the Government of India Act 1935. The decision to set up the board was canceled, but Mudie remained in the post for a year.

=== Joint Secretary, Home Department, Government of India ===
In June 1937, Mudie was temporarily appointed Joint Secretary to the Home Department of the Government of India.

=== Revenue Secretary, United Provinces Government ===
In April 1938, Mudie was appointed Revenue Secretary to the United Provinces Government.

In November 1939, the Congress Party resigned and Mudie replaced the Chief Secretary who was promoted to be one of the four Advisers replacing the Ministers.

=== Bihar ===
Mudie served as acting Governor of Bihar for eight months from 1943 to 1944.

=== Sind ===
Mudie served as the third and last Governor of Sind under the British from 15 January 1946 to 13 August 1947.

=== Supporter of Pakistan movement ===
The following episode is related by Naseer Ahmad Faruqui, an ICS officer, who was at one time secretary to Sir Francis Mudie as well as a close friend, and later rose in Pakistan to Cabinet Secretary (in effect, Head of the Civil Service of Pakistan) under President Ayub Khan. Mr Faruqui writes:

"In 1946 I was Deputy Commissioner of Karachi. The Governor of the Sindh was Sir Francis Mudie, one of the few British who, being fully aware of the machinations of the Hindus, was a great sympathiser of the Muslims and supporter of the Pakistan cause. As I had previously served as his secretary, he used to tell me his inner feelings, especially as he found me to agree with his views. Even after I became Deputy Commissioner of Karachi he used to have discussions with me in favour of the creation of Pakistan. His support of the Muslims being no secret, the Hindu press used to refer to his name sarcastically, from his initials F.M., as "Fateh Muhammad", and send telegrams against him to the Viceroy Lord Wavell and the Secretary of State for India Lord Pethick-Lawrence. But Sir Francis Mudie, instead of being overawed or intimidated, was undeterred and used to fight these complaints.

A British cabinet mission came to India in 1946, headed by Lord Pethick-Lawrence, to discuss the question of Indian independence, and on their way from London to New Delhi they stayed in Karachi for one night as guests of the Governor of the Sindh. The following morning it was my official duty, as District Magistrate, to be present at Karachi airport for their departure. After they left, the Governor beckoned me to accompany him in his car. As soon as the car moved off, he said to me: "Faruqui, they are not going to give us Pakistan". This appeared to be the final, irrevocable decision of the British government...."

=== West Punjab ===
On partition of India and Pakistan in 1947, Mudie was appointed by Mr Jinnah as first Governor of (West) Punjab. He served as governor from 15 August 1947 until 2 August 1949.

He was one of a handful of Europeans who remained in senior positions, to support the fledgling state of Pakistan after the departure of the British.

Mudie was a supporter of the state of Pakistan and in correspondences warned of perceived lack of support from Britain and the Commonwealth.

Pakistan has a powerful, truculent and unscrupulous neighbour. She is a member of the Commonwealth and expects help and support from that neighbour. Instead she sees Britain giving way to India on every point – why should she remain with the Commonwealth? Pakistan will seek her friends elsewhere with disastrous consequence to the whole of Asia and the Middle-East. Any attempt at "impartiality" or detachment would simply be taken as another proof of Britain's pro-India and anti-Muslim attitude.

Mudie was critical of India's 'attack' on Hyderabad and in notes from 1948 wrote:

Indian attack on Hyderabad is akin to the German attack on Belgium/Poland; Hindus in sub-continent can be compared to the Southern Irish in Ulster and the Hindu-Muslim equation can be drawn alongside as a parallel to the Spaniards-Moors relations. A war between Indo-Pak would have violent consequences in the Middle-East; would be taken advantage of by Russia and would be disastrous for the Commonwealth.

In a letter to Sir Maurice Hallet in November 1948 he wrote discussing the Kashmir situation:

India contemplates the invasion of Pakistan – on the other hand, Pakistan has no intention of attacking. The only possible explanation of India's desire to obtain Kashmir – which would be a very difficult province to hold – is their desire to use as a constant threat to Pakistan as it is easy to attack the plains from the hills. The possession of Kashmir is as important to any power wanting to attack Pakistan as the possession of Austria was to Hitler when he attacked Czechoslovakia.

He was also convinced of the strategic importance of Pakistan to prevent the spread of Communism

Pakistan is the barrier to Communism spreading south of the Himalayas and should be preserved intact. This means that Kashmir, or at any rate all but the small Hindu area in the south-east should go to Pakistan which was the best solution of a very difficult problem.

In a speech given at the International Islamic Economic Conference in November 1949, Mudie claimed

Indo-Pak war must be prevented at all costs [because of the very real possibility of] Russian intervention.

but went on to say

Kashmir goes right to the root of the matter. It is a negation of two nation theory – a negation of Pakistan's right to independence. It would outflank the West Punjab – should it ever come to the one-nation theory [being] enforced by war.

Thus

Pakistan [had to] aid the Pathan invaders and later its army had to enter Kashmir to come to the aid of the local insurgents.

He went on to conclude

[the] fundamental problem is Nehru's refusal to accept two-nation theory and Muslim right to rule themselves in Kashmir.

== Later career ==
After resigning in 1949 from position of Governor of West Punjab, he returned to Britain and continued to be active in international affairs.

From 1951 to 1954 he was head of the British Economic Mission to Yugoslavia.

He chaired various inquiries and commissions:

- Inquiry into the Rubber Industry of Malaya, 1954
- Commission on the Desert Locust Control Organisation, 1955
- British Caribbean Federal Capital Commission, 1956

In the 1960s he served as president of the Abertay Historical Society and co-authored that society's ninth publication, "Mains Castle and the Grahams of Fintry", with D. M. Walker.

== Personal life ==
He was married twice, first in 1919 to Mary Spencer with whom he had one daughter Mary Mudie. His first wife died in 1960 and in the same year he remarried to Mary Elizabeth Abercromby, daughter of the late John Ellison Macqueen.

Government offices
Preceded by Sir Hugh Dow	Governor of Sind; January 1946 – August 1947	Succeeded by Shaikh G.H. Hidayatullah
Preceded by none	Governor of West Punjab; August 1947 – August 1949	Succeeded by Sardar Abdur Rab Nishtar
