= 1956 West Pakistan Interim Assembly election =

Elections in Pakistan

- 19 January 1956

310 seats in the West Pakistan Provincial Assembly 158 seats needed for a majority
	First party
Leader	Sardar Bahadur Khan
Party	PML
Leader since	1956
Last election	New
Seats won	245
Chief Minister before election
Khan Abdul Jabbar Khan
Independent
Elected Chief Minister
Khan Abdul Jabbar Khan
RP

Following the formation of West Pakistan under the One Unit scheme on 14 October 1955, an indirect election was held on 19 January 1956 for the newly created West Pakistan Interim Assembly (which was later transformed into the West Pakistan Provincial Assembly). In the election, the Pakistan Muslim League (PML) secured a clear majority by winning 245 seats.

== Background ==
The One Unit scheme merged four Pakistani provinces into a single province named West Pakistan.

In October 1955, a bill concerning the One Unit scheme was passed in the Constituent Assembly of Pakistan, and by an ordinance issued by Iskander Mirza, the governor-general of Pakistan, nearly all western provinces, federally administered areas, and princely states of Pakistan were merged to form the province of West Pakistan. Mushtaq Ahmed Gurmani was appointed as the inaugural governor of the province, and an interim cabinet for the new province was formed in 14 October, with independent politician Khan Abdul Jabbar Khan appointed as the province's chief minister. According to the West Pakistan Establishment Act, 1955, an 18-month interim provincial assembly was formed, consisting of the provincial governor and 310 members. The act also stipulated that an election for the interim assembly would be held on a date appointed by the governor-general. On 20 December 1955, governor-general Mirza announced that the election would be held on the 19th of the following month.

== Nominations and results ==
12 January 1956 was set as the date for the submission of nomination papers for the upcoming election. A total of 468 nomination papers were submitted from Karachi, 24 from Lahore, 45 from Peshwar, 11 from Rawalpindi, 20 from Khairpur, 11 from Gujranwala, 26 from Hyderabad, and 36 from the Quetta. On 13 January 1956, 18 candidates were elected unopposed, while 12 candidates had their nomination papers rejected. On 18 January 1956, the provincial chief minister Khan Abdul Jabbar Khan and 16 others were also elected unopposed. On the same day, in Hyderabad, a person was injured by gunfire while on the way to withdraw their nomination paper at the office of the Returning Officer. Due to election-related tensions, Section 144 was imposed in Jhang until 21 January 1956. At least 600 candidates contested in the election.

The voting and election process concluded on the scheduled day. All cabinet members, including the chief minister, were elected, with the exception of Syed Abid Hussain Shah. The Pakistan Muslim League (PML) secured a majority in the election, with 245 of its candidates elected to the interim assembly.

== Aftermath ==
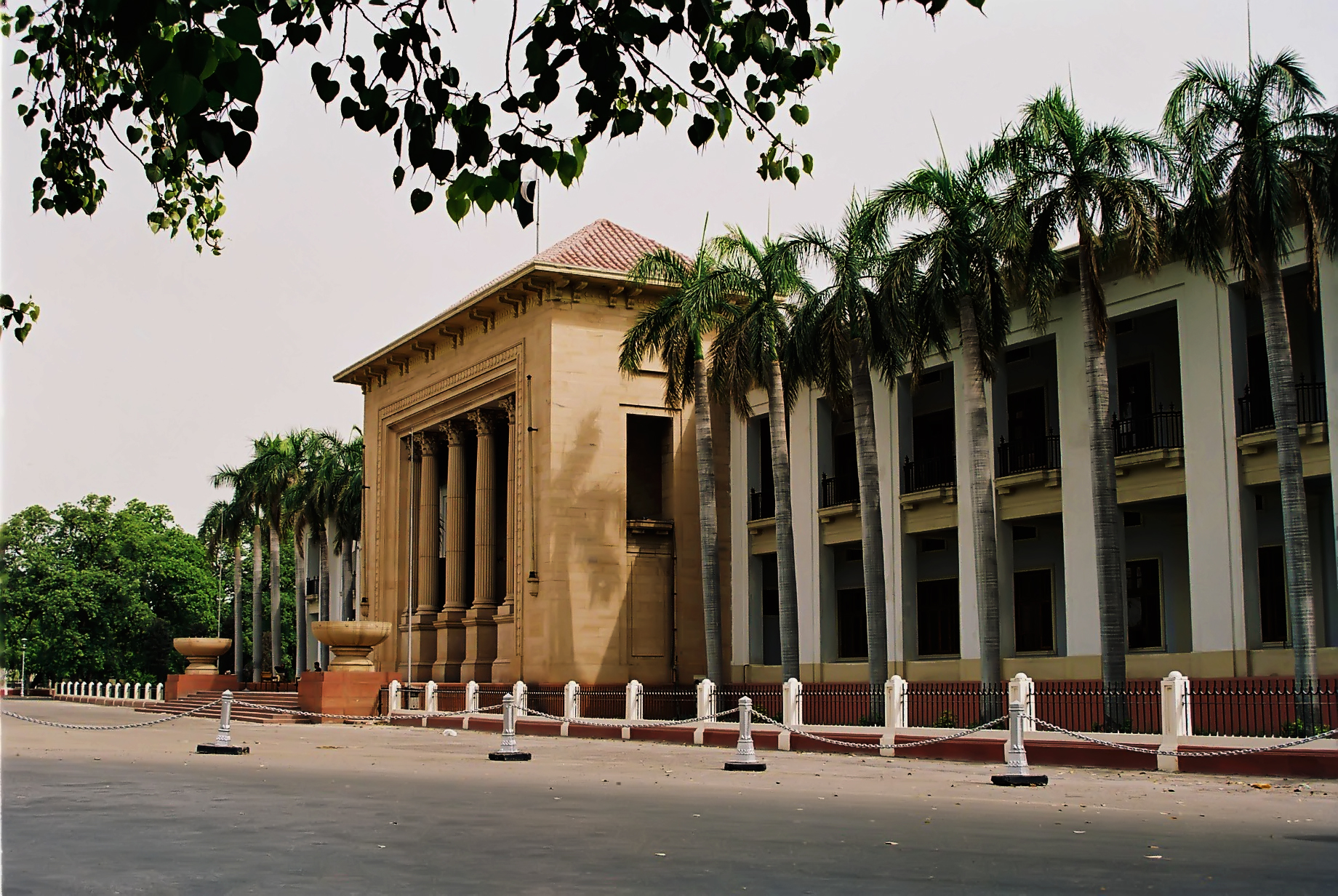
The first session of the West Pakistan Provincial Assembly was held on 19 May 1956 in the Assembly house in Lahore.

Following the election, the Interim Assembly of West Pakistan was formed. All members of Khan Abdul Jabbar Khan's interim cabinet were from the PML, but he himself was unwilling to join the party. In March, through the mediation of Mirza, an agreement was reached that Khan would remain a neutral and would not join any political party until the next provincial election. However, in the same month, the chief minister expressed his intention to form a new political party and restructured his cabinet with eight former PML politicians. Earlier, on 23 March 1956, the day the Constitution of Pakistan came into effect and Mirza became interim president, the Interim Assembly was transformed into the West Pakistan Provincial Assembly. On 3 April 1956, PML members in the West Pakistan Provincial Assembly elected Sardar Bahadur Khan as their parliamentary leader. On the same day, the parliamentary party decided that only members of their party would be accepted as cabinet ministers. As the leader of the majority parliamentary party, he appealed to the governor Gurmani to allow him to form a new cabinet. Meanwhile, the chief minister suggested resolving the issue through a no-confidence motion in the Provincial Assembly. On 23 April 1956, with the assistance of Mirza and Gurmani, Khan formed the Pakistan Republican Party (RP). He received support from many members of the West Pakistan Provincial Assembly for the new party. Following the establishment of the RP, the PML lost its absolute majority in the Provincial Assembly. On 19 May 1956, the first session of the West Pakistan Provincial Assembly’s term was convened in Lahore. It was claimed that the assembly included 161 members from the PML and 156 from the RP. In order to dissolve Khan's cabinet, the PML would have to win a confidence vote through a motion of no-confidence only after defeating the RP's nominee in the Speaker election or budget cut proposals. On 20 May 1956, the RP's nominee Fazal Ilahi Chaudhry was elected Speaker of the Assembly, defeating the PML's nominee Mir Ghulam Ali Talpur by one vote. Since the initial vote count was tied, the Assembly Chairman Mumtaz Hasan Kizilbash used his casting vote in favor of Chaudhry. Allegations were made that two members were coerced into abstaining from voting for the PML candidate.
