= Daulatana =

Joyia clan in Punjab, Pakistan

- Jāti: Rajput
- Religions: Islam
- Languages: Saraiki
- Country: Pakistan
- Region: Punjab
- Ethnicity: Saraiki
- Family names: yes

Daultana (Urdu: دَولتانہ), is a clan of Joyia tribe settled in Punjab, Pakistan.

== Notable people ==
- Ahmad Yar Khan Daultana (Urdu: میاں احمد یار خان دولتانہ), former Chief of the Daultanas of Luddan, father of Mian Mumtaz Daultana.
- Mian Mumtaz Daultana (Urdu: میاں ممتاز دَولتانہ), former Chief Minister of Punjab and High Commissioner to the United Kingdom.
- Tehmina Daultana (Urdu: تہمِینہ دَولتانہ), former minister and member of the Parliament of Pakistan for the Pakistan Muslim League (N), niece of Mian Mumtaz Daultana.

== See also ==
- List of Punjabi Muslim tribes
