= Abdul Qayyum Khan =

20th-century Pakistani politician

Khan Abdul Qayyum Khan
- عبد القیوم خان

17th Minister for Interior
- In office 13 May 1972 – 13 January 1977
- Prime Minister: Zulfikar Ali Bhutto
- Preceded by: Zulfikar Ali Bhutto
- Succeeded by: Zulfikar Ali Bhutto

5th Chief Minister of the North-West Frontier Province
- In office 23 August 1947 – 23 April 1953
- Governor: George Cunningham; Ambrose Flux Dundas; Sahibzada Mohammad Khurshid; Muhammad Ibrahim Khan; I. I. Chundrigar; Khwaja Shahabuddin
- Preceded by: Khan Abdul Jabbar Khan
- Succeeded by: Sardar Abdur Rashid Khan

Personal details
- Born: 16 June 1901 Chitral, Chitral State, British India
- Died: 23 October 1981 (aged 80) Islamabad, Pakistan
- Resting place: Peshawar, Pakistan
- Party: Qayyum Muslim League (1970-1981)
- Other political affiliations: Indian National Congress (1934-1945); All-India Muslim League (1945-1947); Pakistan Muslim League (1947-1958); Council Muslim League (1962-1970)
- Education: Government College University, London School of Economics, Lincoln Inn

Khan Abdul Qayyum Khan Kashmiri (Urdu: عبدالقیوم خان کشمیری) (16 July 1901 – 23 October 1981) was a major figure in British Indian and later Pakistani politics, in particular in the North-West Frontier Province, where he served as the Chief Minister from 23 August 1947 to 23 April 1953. He also served as the Interior Minister of Pakistan from 1972 to 1977.

== Early life ==
Abdul Qayyum Khan was born in the State of Chitral in Kashmiri Family. His father, Khan Abdul Hakim, was originally from the Wanigam village in the Baramulla district, Jammu and Kashmir, but worked as a Tehsildar in the North-West Frontier Province (NWFP) of British India, (now Khyber Pakhtunkhwa in Pakistan).

Khan was educated at Aligarh Muslim University and the London School of Economics. He became a barrister of the Lincoln's Inn.

One of his brothers, Abdul Hamid Khan, served as a prime minister of Azad Jammu and Kashmir, and another brother, Khan Abdul Rauf Khan, was a renowned lawyer.

== Legal career ==
Abdul Qayum Khan was one of the eminent lawyers of N.W.F.P. During his professional career he conducted some very important cases. He used to practice in criminal law. Mirza Shams ul Haq was his most trustworthy colleague, who remained always close to him during profession and politics. Abdul Qayum was also assisted in his chambers by Muhammad Nazirullah Khan advocate, who later served as a provincial secretary general and senior vice president of Pakistan Muslim League.

== Political career ==
=== Indian National Congress ===
Starting his political career in 1934 with the Indian National Congress, Khan quickly rose to serve as an elected member of the Central Legislative Assembly (1937–38) and the deputy leader of the Congress in the Assembly. At that time he admired Khan Abdul Ghaffar Khan. He authored a book, Gold and Guns on the Pathan Frontier, in which he praised Ghaffar Khan and denounced Jinnah and the two-nation theory. Abdul Qayyum Khan said that the North West Frontier Province would resist the partition of India with its blood. He switched his loyalties to the Muslim League in 1945. He later claimed that Ghaffar Khan was plotting Jinnah's assassination. He banned his own book after he became the Chief Minister in the N.W.F.P. The book however continued fetching royalties even after he joined the Muslim League.

=== Muslim League and Partition ===
In the 1946 provincial elections, Khan campaigned for the All-India Muslim League along with Pir of Manki Sharif. However, the Muslim League won only 17 seats in comparison to the 30 seats of the Congress Party. The Congress Party formed the provincial government under the premiership of Khan Abdul Jabbar Khan (popularly known as "Dr. Khan Sahib").

Abdul Qayyum Khan was put in charge of destabilising the Congress government in the province through street agitations, ideological rhetoric and acquisition of sympathetic Muslim officers in the government. The presence of a Congress government at the extreme north-west of the Indian subcontinent was anomalous, and the province became a bone of contention between the Congress and the Muslim League as part of the Partition of India. Eventually, the British decided to hold a referendum to determine which dominion the province should go to. Abdul Ghaffar Khan demanded a separate nation of 'Pakhtunistan' comprising both the North-West Frontier Province and Pashtun parts of Afghanistan. When it was denied by the British Raj, he and his party boycotted the referendum held by the British government. The Muslim League won an easy victory for Pakistan (289,244 votes against 2,874 for India).

Within a week of the independence of Pakistan, the Congress government was dismissed under orders from Governor General Jinnah. Abdul Qayyum Khan was put in charge of a minority government on 23 August 1947. Khan navigated through the troubled waters ably, winning the defection of enough Congress legislators to support his government.

=== First Kashmir War ===
Qayyum Khan was a key instigator of the First Kashmir War, if not the chief instigator. (Note: Saraf, Kashmiris Fight for Freedom, Volume 2 (2015, p. 47): [In September 1947] "He [Abdul Qayyum Khan] was, therefore, of the opinion that while an internal revolt was desirable, what really was needed was an organised attack from Pakistan. It seems that he had already established contact with Major Khurshid Anwar and had drawn up a plan for the entry of tribesmen into the State through Muzaffarabad."; Ankit, The Cunningham Contribution (2010, p. 34): [In October 1947] 'Iskander Mirza came to the Governor and finally brought him into the loop. The Defence Secretary briefed the Governor "all the underground history; apologised on behalf of Liaquat for keeping him in the dark and confirmed that it was decided about a month ago that Poonchis' revolt should be helped. Jinnah sanctioned the project 15 days ago while Abdul Qayyum was in it from the beginning."'; ISPR, Defence and Media 1991 (1991, p. 100): "The Kashmir war had three to four distinct phases. Initially there were spontaneous uprisings... In the second phase volunteers and Mujahideen joined the lashkars. In this phase the handling of operations was in the hands of Khan Abdul Qayyum, Chief Minister of NWFP, Khawaja Abdul Rahim, the Commissioner of Rawalpindi and a few other spirited leaders, without any control by the Federal Government."; Effendi, Punjab Cavalry (2007, p. 149): "However, it was Qayyum Khan, Chief Minister of NWFP, and the 'Young Turks' of the Muslim League who launched the invasion of the state."; Siddiqi, Vivid memories and lost opportunities (2000): [In November 1947] "The Governor, Sir George Cunningham, and the Premier (as a provincial Chief Minister was then known), Khan Abdul Qayyum Khan, were in charge of the tribal outflow and reinforcements. Of the two, mainly Qayyum Khan had been responsible for the induction of the tribal lashkars in the Kashmir jihad.")

=== North-West Frontier Province ===
As the premier of the NWFP, Qayyum Khan faced internal dissension. The Pir of Manki Sharif, who was a key figure in the campaign for referendum, was miffed that he was passed over for the post. He objected to Khan holding both the premiership of the state and the presidency of the provincial Muslim League. The Pir gathered disgruntled legislators and intended to bring a vote of no-confidence against Khan. Khan diffused his efforts. Then the Pir formed a separate party under the banner of All Pakistan Awami Muslim League. An exasperated Khan responded with "full fury and force". He forced out the Pir of Manki Sharif from the NWFP and imprisoned nine other leaders. Despite the crackdown, the Awami Muslim League contested the provincial elections in 1951 to win 4 seats.

Qayyum Khan's administration was known for its development work in the province, including the construction of Peshawar University and the Warsak dam. He introduced compulsory free education up to middle school level in Frontier province, the first province of Pakistan to have this reform. He also made poor friendly amendments to the land revenue laws. He evoked opposition from a section of the feudal class due to his egalitarian policies. His political stand was opposition to the Khudai Khidmatgar movement of Ghaffar Khan. His alleged role in ordering the Babrra massacre is one which he faces much criticism. He led the Muslim League to a landslide victory in the 1951 elections, despite opposition from the Khudai Khidmatgar movement and opposition from federally backed fellow Muslim league opponents like Yusuf Khattak.

Qayyum Khan served as the Chief Minister till 23 April 1953.

=== Central Government ===
He served as central minister for Industries, Food and Agriculture in 1953.

Arrested by the Ayub Khan regime, he was disqualified from politics and imprisoned for two years before finally being released.

Contesting the 1970 General Election in Pakistan from three seats as leader of the Pakistan Muslim League-Qayyum faction, he won two National Assembly of Pakistan seats, one provincial seat and, in 1973, entered into alliance with the Pakistan Peoples Party (PPP) after East Pakistan broke away in the Bangladesh Liberation War.

Appointed federal interior minister by Zulfiqar Bhutto, he served in that post till the 1977 elections, when his party suffered a near total rout. After Zia-ul-Haq's assumption of power, Qayyum Khan tried to unify all the disparate Muslim League factions. His efforts were inconclusive and he died on 22 October 1981.

He was always opposed by Khan Habibullah Khan; they were lifelong rivals since they were young classmates at Islamia College, Peshawar.

== Criticism ==
=== Babrra massacre ===
Under the orders of Abdul Qayyum Khan the Babrra massacre occurred on 12 August 1948 in the Charsadda District of the North-West Frontier Province (now Khyber Pukhtunkhwa) of Pakistan, when workers of the Khudai Khidmatgar movement protesting the jailing of their leader, anti-colonial independence activist Abdul Ghaffar Khan were fired upon by the provincial government. According to official figures, around 15 protestors were killed while around 40 were injured. However, Khudai Khidmatgar sources maintained that around 150 were killed and 400 were injured.

In September 1948, then Chief Minister, Abdul Qayyum Khan gave a statement in the provincial assembly, "I had imposed section 144 at Babra. When the people did not disperse, then firing was opened on them. They were lucky that the police had finished ammunition; otherwise not a single soul would have been left alive". Khan Qayyum said hinting at the four members of the opposition in the provincial assembly. He said; "If they were killed, the government would not care about them."

== See also ==
- Sardar Abdur Rashid Khan
- Yusuf Khattak
- Babrra massacre

== Bibliography ==
- Ankit, Rakesh (March 2010). "By George: The Cunningham Contribution". Epilogue. 4 (3): 33–35. Archived from the original on 15 November 2016.
- Effendi, Col. M. Y. (2007), Punjab Cavalry: Evolution, Role, Organisation and Tactical Doctrine 11 Cavalry, Frontier Force, 1849-1971, Karachi: Oxford University Press, ISBN 978-0-19-547203-5
- Hodson, H. V. (1969), The Great Divide: Britain, India, Pakistan, London: Hutchinson, ISBN 9780090971503
- ISPR (1991), Defence Media 1991, Inter Services Public Relations
- Jaffrelot, Christophe (2002), Pakistan: Nationalism without A Nation, Zed Books, ISBN 978-1-84277-117-4
- Kamran, Tahir (2009), "Early phase of electoral politics in Pakistan: 1950s" (PDF), South Asian Studies, 24 (2): 257–282
- Siddiqi, A. R. Brig. (2000), "Vivid memories and lost opportunities", Quarterly Journal of the Pakistan Historical Society, Volume 48, Pakistan Historical Society
- Samad, Yunas (1995), A Nation in Turmoil: Nationalism and Ethnicity in Pakistan, 1937-1958, Sage, ISBN 978-0-8039-9214-6
- Saraf, Muhammad Yusuf (2015) [first published 1979 by Ferozsons], Kashmiris Fight for Freedom, Volume 2, Mirpur: National Institute Kashmir Studies
- Snedden, Christopher (2015), Understanding Kashmir and Kashmiris, Oxford University Press, ISBN 978-1-84904-342-7

Political offices
Preceded by Khan Abdul Jabbar Khan	Chief Minister of Khyber-Pakhtunkhwa; 1947–1953	Succeeded by Sardar Abdur Rashid Khan
Preceded by Zulfikar Ali Bhutto	Interior Minister of Pakistan; 1972–1977	Succeeded by Zulfikar Ali Bhutto
