= Mary Verschuur =

Mary Verschuur (born 1943) is an American historian and teacher. Her works concern social life in early modern Scotland during the Scottish Reformation.

== Career ==
Mary Verschuur nee Black was born in Perth, Scotland. She was a teacher at Montessori Schools in Omaha and Nebraska. She gained a PhD at the University of Glasgow in 1985.

== Publications ==
- (with Alan R. MacDonald) Records of the Convention of Royal Burghs (Scottish History Society, 2013).
- A Noble and Potent Lady: Katherine Campbell, Countess of Crawford (Dundee: Abertay Historical Society, 2006).
- Politics or Religion? Successes and Failures in the Reformation of Perth (Dunedin Academic Press, 2006).
- "The Perth Charterhouse in the Sixteenth Century", Innes Review, 39:1 (Spring 1988), pp. 1–11. doi:10.3366/inr.1988.39.1.1
- "Merchants and Craftsmen in Sixteenth-Century Perth", The Early Modern Town in Scotland (Croom Helm, 1987), pp. 46–47.
