= All-Pakistan Awami League =

Political party in Pakistan

- Urdu name: آل پاکستان عوامی لیگ
- Bengali name: নিখিল পাকিস্তান আওয়ামী লীগ
- Abbreviation: AL
- Founder: Huseyn Shaheed Suhrawardy
- Founded: February 1950; 76 years ago
- Dissolved: 26 March 1971 (55 years, 186 days) (banned) 6 July 1971 (55 years, 84 days) (ended)
- Merger of: EPAML; JAML; JML
- Preceded by: Jinnah Awami Muslim League
- Succeeded by: NAP (1957); PDP (1967); NPL (1968); AL (1971)
- Headquarters: Haroon Abdullah Road, Karachi, Sindh
- Newspaper: Ittefaq
- Student wing: Pakistan Students' League
- Ideology: Left-wing nationalism Democratic socialism Secularism
- Political position: Left-wing
- National affiliation: COP (1965)
- Colors: Green

Election symbol
- Boat

Party flag

The All-Pakistan Awami League (before 1955 the All-Pakistan Awami Muslim League), or simply Awami League, was a Pakistani political party founded by Huseyn Shaheed Suhrawardy in February 1950. Pir of Manki Sharif and Khan Ghulam Mohammad Khan from the North-West Frontier Province (NWFP) joined it soon afterwards.

== History ==
After the independence of Pakistan in 1947, Amin ul-Hasanat, former Muslim League politician in North-West Frontier Province, established Jinnah Awami Muslim League. He got this idea from Huseyn Shaheed Suhrawardy, who advised him this name. In 1949, Suhrawardy advised Shawkat Ali to leave Muslim League and form another political party. Later, Ali discussed with Abdul Hamid Khan Bhasani, another League politician, to form new party. Then East Pakistan Awami Muslim League was founded by Abdul Hamid Khan Bhashani on 23 June 1949.

In 1949, Suhrawardy left Muslim League saying that the party became the party of elites and the party distanced itself from people. In the same year, Iftikhar Mamdot was dismissed from the premiership of Punjab and formed a party called Jinnah Muslim League. In 1950, Suhrawardy established All-Pakistan Awami Muslim League in Western Pakistan. The new parties decided to form an alliance named Jinnah Awami Muslim League prior to the provincial elections in 1951. It was also established in Sindh.

Subsequently, the member parties merged in 1952 and used the name All-Pakistan Awami Muslim League. In 1958, the party was banned with all other parties when military rule was started. In 1962, the legal permission was given to revive political parties, but its founder and leader Suhrawardy was arrested and released later. He didn’t want to revive his party, instead he established National Democratic Front. Suhrawardy died and on 11 January 1964. Afterwards, politicians of the party's western wing met and revived the West Pakistan Awami League, the western branch of the All-Pakistan Awami League. On 25 January 1964, the party was fully revived with the reformation of its eastern wing named East Pakistan Awami League.

In 1965, the party joined Combined Opposition Parties and supported Fatima Jinnah as a candidate for 1965 Pakistani presidential election. In 1966, the party proposed Six point resolution, calling for greater economy for East Pakistan. In 1967, the party was split into two faction. The supporters of the Pakistan Democratic Movement formed a faction under Nawabzada Nasrullah Khan. The other faction, led by Sheikh Mujibur Rahman, was supporter of the Six point resolution. The second faction decided to reform the party without the opposite faction.

In 1968, the party suffered devastatingly as its many important leaders were in jail for Agartala Conspiracy Case. From its revival to the fall of Ayub government, the party's council has not met. The Anti-Ayub uprising gave the party overwhelming popularity in East Pakistan. In 1969, Nasrullah's faction merged in Pakistan Democratic Party and the Mujib's faction became the only Awami League.

After Operation Searchlight, in a radio address on the evening of March 26, Yahya Khan, the then president of Pakistan, declared the Awami League treasonous and banned the party. In addition to this, the government seized the bank accounts of the Awami League. On 6 July 1971, during the Bangladesh Liberation War, the party was dissolved at Siliguri Conference and the provincial branch in East Pakistan succeeded as Bangladesh Awami League.

== Officials ==
=== President ===
| Name | Assumed office | Left office | Source |
|---|---|---|---|
| Huseyn Shaheed Suhrawardy | 1950 | 1958 | |
| Nawabzada Nasrullah Khan | 1964 | 1967 | |
| Sheikh Mujibur Rahman | 1968 | 1971 | |

=== General Secretary ===
| Name | Assumed office | Left office | Ref |
|---|---|---|---|
| Abdul Sattar Khan Niazi | 1950 | ? | |
| Mahmudul Haq Usmani | ? | 1956 | |
| Sheikh Zahiruddin | ? | 1967 | |
| Abul Hasnat Muhammad Qamaruzzaman | 1968 | 1971 | |

== State leaders ==
Prime Minister of Pakistan
| Name | Term in office |
| Huseyn Shaheed Suhrawardy | 1956–1957 |

Chief Minister of East Pakistan
| Name | Term in office |
| Ataur Rahman Khan | 1956–1958 |

== Electoral history ==
Pakistan National Assembly elections

| Election | Leader | Votes | % | Seats | +/– | Position | Government |
|---|---|---|---|---|---|---|---|
| 1955 | Huseyn Shaheed Suhrawardy | | 16.67% | 12 / 72 | New | 3rd | Opposition |
| 1970 | Sheikh Mujibur Rahman | 12,937,162 | 39.2% | 160 / 300 | ▲148 | ▲1st | Banned |

East Pakistan Provincial Assembly elections

| Election | Leader | Votes | % | Seats | +/– | Position | Government |
|---|---|---|---|---|---|---|---|
| 1954 | | | | 143 / 237 | New | 1st | Coalition |
| 1970 | | 12,937,162 | 73.2% | 288 / 300 | ▲145 | 1st | Banned |

North-West Frontier Province Provincial Assembly elections

| Election | Leader | Votes | % | Seats | +/– | Position | Government |
|---|---|---|---|---|---|---|---|
| 1951 | | | | 4 / 85 | New | 2nd | Opposition |

Punjab Provincial Assembly elections

| Election | Leader | Votes | % | Seats | +/– | Position | Government |
|---|---|---|---|---|---|---|---|
| 1951 | | | | 32 / 192 | New | 2nd | Opposition |

== Bibliography ==
- Kamran, Tahir (July–December 2009). "Early phase of electoral politics in Pakistan: 1950s". South Asian Studies. 24 (2): 257–282.
- Samad, Yunas (1995), A Nation in Turmoil: Nationalism and Ethnicity in Pakistan, 1937-1958, Sage, ISBN 978-0-8039-9214-6
- Chowdhury, Afsan (2021). ১৯৭১: অসহযোগ আন্দোলন ও প্রতিরোধ [1971: Non-Cooperation Movement and Resistance] (in Bengali). Dhaka: Kothaprokash. ISBN 9789845101332.
