= Iftikhar Hussain Khan Mamdot =

Pakistani politician (1906–1969)

Iftikhar Hussain Mamdot
- افتخار حسین ممدوٹ
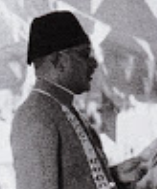
- Mamdot in 1940

1st Chief Minister of West Punjab
- In office 15 August 1947 – 25 January 1949
- Governor: Sir Francis Mudie
- Preceded by: Position Established
- Succeeded by: Governor's rule (1949–51); Mumtaz Daultana (1951)

Leader of Opposition of Punjab
- In office 1946–1947
- Preceded by: Bhim Sen Sachar
- Succeeded by: Himself (1951) (in West Punjab; Gopal Singh Khalsa (1952) (in East Punjab)

6th Governor of Sindh
- In office 24 June 1954 – 14 October 1955
- Preceded by: Habib Rahimtoola
- Succeeded by: Position abolished Succeeded by West Pakistan

Personal details
- Born: Iftikhar Hussain Khan; 31 December 1906 Lahore, Punjab, British India
- Died: 16 October 1969 (aged 62) Lahore, West Pakistan
- Cause of death: Influenza
- Relations: Asma Mamdot (niece)
- Education: Government College, Lahore

Nawab Iftikhar Hussain Khan Mamdot (31 December 1906 – 16 October 1969) was a Pakistani politician and independence activist who served as the first chief minister of West Punjab from 1947 to 1949, following Pakistan's independence. He also served as the Governor of Sindh from 1954 to 1955.

== Early life ==
Mamdot was born in Lahore in 1906 as the son of Shahnawaz Khan Mamdot into the Kheshgi family. He was educated at Government College, Lahore, and thereafter joined the police service of Hyderabad State in the Deccan.

On the death of his father in 1942, he succeeded him as the Nawab of Mamdot and on inheriting his lands became the largest landowner in the Punjab. He also succeeded his father in politics as President of the Punjab Muslim League between 1942 and 1944. He actively worked to encourage the wealthy landowners of the Punjab to drop their support for the Unionist Party and support the Pakistan Movement. In 1946, he was elected to the Punjab Legislative Assembly and became leader of the opposition. Later that year, he was the only Muslim League leader in the Punjab who supported Muhammad Ali Jinnah's call for the voluntary exchange of the populations within the Punjab. During the Partition of India in 1947, he migrated to Pakistan, abandoning his vast landholdings in eastern Punjab which became part of the Republic of India.

== Chief Minister of West Punjab ==
On 15 August 1947, he was appointed as the first Chief Minister of West Punjab in Pakistan. Having foregone his constituency in Firozepur district and extensive estates in East Punjab, Mamdot sought to rebuild his powerbase in Pakistan. Without official sanction, he created the Allotment Revising Committee to cultivate new followers amongst refugees, and allegedly siphoned off properties and cars to his followers and former tenants. He became the largest claimant for agricultural land amongst the refugees. He opposed his minister for refugee rehabilitation Mian Iftikharuddin, whose reformist proposals advocated permanently settling refugees on evacuee property and excess land belonging to bigger landlords. His stance, together with his refusal to cooperate with the centrally appointed Pakistan and West Punjab Refugee and Rehabilitation Council led to the resignation of Iftikharuddin, providing a free hand to Mamdot to allocate evacuee properties as he wished.

Factionalism plagued Mamdot's ministry. Aside from conflict with Iftikharuddin and Ghazanfar Ali Khan, head of the Refugee and Rehabilitation Council, he clashed with Mumtaz Daultana and Sir Francis Mudie. He labelled Mudie, the first Governor of West Punjab, a "foreigner", "pro-unionist" and "pro-Indian" and in turn, Mudie criticised him, alleging that he remained in power to get his hands on more property.

Mamdot's ministry endured widespread accusations of corruption, being labelled "unbelievably corrupt" by one British official. It was alleged he used public funds to personally acquire about 2,000 acres of prime agricultural land at nominal rates in Montgomery District, that he awarded to his brother several hundred acres of land in the same district that belonged to Sir Khizar Hayat Tiwana and that he secretly deposited over 100,000 rupees from the Kashmir fund into his brother's account. Rival politicians alleged that he diluted their power bases by relocating their supporters randomly across the province. A spokesman for the Rajput refugee community criticised Mamdot for not settling refugees together in accordance with the districts they came from, and noted that one village had refugees from between 13/14 different East Punjab districts which resulted in clashes on a daily basis. Mamdot resigned as Chief Minister in 1949 and an official enquiry was launched against him in relation to maladministration. As no one was able to form a new ministry, the Governor of West Punjab assumed direct control of the province.

In 1950, he left the Muslim League to form a new party, the Jinnah Muslim League, which contested the 1951 elections against the Muslim League led by his arch-rival Mumtaz Daultana. One consequence of the claims against Mamdot appeared following the result of the election, as representatives of refugees constituted just 5 per cent of the Punjab Assembly, despite refugees constituting about one-third of the total Punjabi population.

== Later life and death ==
He rejoined the Muslim League in 1953 and was appointed Governor of Sind by Malik Ghulam Muhammad in 1954. He resigned his post in 1955 following the departure of Malik Ghulam Muhammad from the political scene, and thereafter remained in the political wilderness.

Mamdot died in Lahore on 16 October 1969.

Political offices
Preceded by Position Established	Chief Minister of Punjab; 15 August 1947 – 25 January 1949	Succeeded by Governor's rule
