= Mumtaz Daultana =

Pakistani politician (1916–1995)

Mumtaz Daulatana
- ممتاز دولتانہ
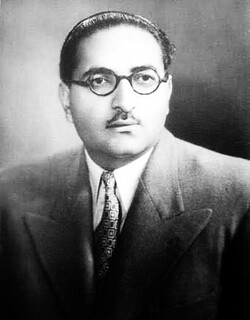
- Daultana, c. 1957

Minister of Defence
- In office 19 October 1957 – 18 December 1957
- Preceded by: Huseyn Shaheed Suhrawardy
- Succeeded by: Sir Feroz Khan Noon

Chief Minister of West Punjab
- In office 15 April 1951 – 3 April 1953
- Governor: Abdur Rab Nishtar; I. I. Chundrigar
- Preceded by: Governor's rule
- Succeeded by: Sir Feroz Khan Noon

Personal details
- Born: 20 February 1916 Luddan, Punjab, British India
- Died: 30 January 1995 (aged 78) Lahore, Punjab, Pakistan
- Party: CML (1962–1972)
- Other political affiliations: PML (1947–1958); AIML (pre-1947)
- Parent: Ahmad Yar Khan Daultana
- Education: Government College, Lahore; University of Oxford

Mian Mumtaz Daulatana (Note: Punjabi/Urdu: میاں ممتاز دولتانہ) (20 February 1916 – 30 January 1995) was a Pakistani politician and independence activist who served as the second chief minister of West Punjab from 1951 to 1953. He also served as the minister of defence in the federal government from October to December 1957.

== Early life ==
Daultana was born in Luddan in 1916, the son of Nawab Ahmad Yar Khan Daultana, a wealthy Punjabi landowner. He belonged to the Daultana clan of the Johiya tribe. His father was a supporter of the Unionist Party in the Punjab, whilst his uncle Chaudhry Sir Shahab-ud-Din was the first speaker of the Provincial Assembly of the Punjab.

Daultana studied history at Government College, Lahore, graduating in 1933. Thereafter he moved to the United Kingdom and completed a Master of Arts at Corpus Christi College, Oxford. Whilst at the University of Oxford he was elected President of the Indian society. He was called to the Bar at Middle Temple in 1939.

== Career ==
=== Pakistan movement ===
Daultana joined the Punjab Muslim League in 1942 despite being from a leading Unionist family. In 1944 he assisted in drafting the League's manifesto, promising civil liberties, elimination of official interference in elections and a progressive economic policy. He was elected to the Punjab Legislative Assembly in 1946. Daultana was of the opinion that the unity of India could not be preserved and that Muslims of the Punjab should unite with their co-religionists across India in the demand for Pakistan.

=== Chief Minister of West Punjab ===
Following the creation of Pakistan, the Muslim League assumed control of the new West Punjab province. Iftikhar Hussain Khan Mamdot, as Chief Minister of West Punjab appointed Daultana to his cabinet alongside other scions of leading rural families Mian Iftikharuddin and Shaukat Hayat Khan. Conflicts plagued the cabinet, and Mian Iftikharuddin left to found the Azad Pakistan Party and was soon joined by Shaukat Hayat Khan.

In 1951, after elections in West Punjab, Daultana was chosen as parliamentary leader of the Muslim League in the Punjab Assembly and invited to form a government. Daultana's cabinet, which contained just one migratee politician, was characterised as a cabinet of landlords. As Chief Minister he soon banned the Urdu daily newspaper Nawa-i-Waqt which had been a supporter of Mamdot and introduced agrarian reforms within the Punjab. Daultana regarded these land reforms, which in theory gave tenants full security for tenure as long as they paid their rent and took care of the land, as the most progressive in the world. Critics however labelled them as merely cosmetic, as they made no reference to a ceiling for large estates and only tried to increase tenants' share of produce by ten percent. In reality, the regulations had little effect and landlords instead attempted to divert attention towards the jagirs held by rival politicians who had opposed the Pakistan movement. His government proposed the abolition of all jagirs made in the Punjab since 1857. This proposal met with considerable opposition, and was amended to target certain influential persons who were given grants for unpatriotic and anti-national activities in pre-independence days. Grants of land to religious institutions or to the military personnel were exempted The scope of the Act was further narrowed to include only grants made under the government of Unionist Premier Sir Khizar Hayat Tiwana between 1945 and 1947.

=== Lahore Martial Law 1953 ===
During his tenure, anti-Ahmadi sentiment intensified stoked by Islamist groups such as the Majlis-e-Ahrar-ul-Islam. In 1951 they issued demands that Ahmadis be declared non-Muslims for legal purposes, that Sir Zafarullah Khan the Ahmadi Minister of Foreign Affairs resign and that Ahmadi's be banned from holding political office. During the 1953 Lahore riots despite the protesters demands being rejected by the central government, Daultana lent them his support. However, when he was unable to control the rioters, the central government called in the army and imposed martial law in Lahore. Within days of Prime Minister, Sir Khawaja Nazimuddin's arrival in Lahore, Daultana had resigned. He was succeeded by Sir Feroz Khan Noon.

== Later activities ==
He was also Defence Minister of Pakistan in the short-lived government of Ibrahim Ismail Chundrigar in 1957. He served as Pakistan's High Commissioner to the United Kingdom from 1972 to 1979.

Tehmina Daultana former minister and Pakistan Muslim League (N) (PML-N) MNA (Member of National Assembly of Pakistan) is his niece.

== See also ==
- Daulatana
- Azeem Daultana
- Tehmina Daultana

== Notes ==
Political offices
Preceded by Iftikhar Hussain Khan Mamdot	Chief Minister of Punjab; 1951–1953	Succeeded by Feroz Khan Noon
Preceded by Huseyn Shaheed Suhrawardy	Defence Minister of Pakistan; 1957	Succeeded by Feroz Khan Noon
