= Muslim League (1947–1958) =

- Urdu name: مسلم لیگ
- Bengali name: মুসলিম লীগ
- Abbreviation: ML
- Leader: Liaquat Ali Khan; Ch. Khaliquzzaman; Khwaja Nazimuddin
- President: Abdur Rab Nishtar (1958)
- General Secretary: Qazi Muhammad Isa (1958)
- Chief Whip: Mahmud Husain
- Founded: 15 December 1947
- Dissolved: 7 October 1958
- Preceded by: AIML
- Succeeded by: See List of Muslim League breakaway groups
- Headquarters: Karachi, Pakistan
- Newspaper: Dawn
- Ideology: Pakistani nationalism Islamic modernism Capitalism; Factions: Islamic socialism
- Political position: Big tent
- Colors: Green

Party flag

The All-Pakistan Muslim League, more commonly referred to as Muslim League, was the original successor of the All-India Muslim League, the party that led the Pakistan Movement and achieved independence for Pakistan. Following Partition, the All-India Muslim League was renamed All-Pakistan Muslim League in December 1947.

It commanded a supermajority in the first Constituent Assembly of Pakistan, and formed five successive governments during the country's first decade: those of prime ministers Liaquat Ali Khan, Khwaja Nazimuddin, Mohammad Ali Bogra, Chaudhry Muhammad Ali, and Ibrahim Ismail Chundrigar; the latter two of whom headed unstable minority governments. The party was heavily defeated in the 1954 East Bengal Legislative Assembly election by the United Front, a political alliance led by a dissident offshoot, the Awami League.

The Muslim League ministries produced the draft Constitution of 1954, which was precluded by Governor-General Ghulam Muhammad sacking the Constituent Assembly the same year, and the Constitution of 1956, which was abrogated in 1958 following a military coup by army chief General Muhammad Ayub Khan, and the imposition of martial law by President Iskander Mirza. All political parties, including the Muslim League, were dissolved.

== History ==
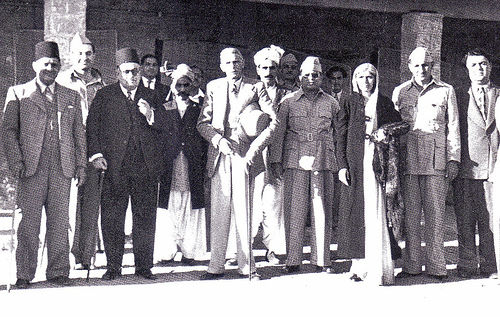
Jinnah and Muslim League founders

On the foundation of Pakistan, the president of the All-India Muslim League, Muhammad Ali Jinnah, became the new nation's Governor-General, and the secretary general of the Muslim League, Liaquat Ali Khan became Prime Minister. The All-India Muslim League was disbanded in December 1947 and succeeded by two organisations, the Muslim League and the Indian Union Muslim League, the first being its original successor in Pakistan. Muhammad Ali Jinnah resigned as the president of the Muslim League on 17 December 1947 and the two Muslim Leagues respectively elected Chaudhry Khaliquzzaman as President of the Muslim League (Pakistan) and Muhammad Ismail as the president for Indian Union Muslim League in post-independence India.

=== Ideology ===
The party remained the chief governing party for the early years after the partition of 1947.

According to Dawn newspaper, a major English-language newspaper of Pakistan:

"Jinnah in his first address described Pakistan as a modern Muslim-majority state but where the state would remain religiously neutral and where citizens would transcend their personal faiths to become Pakistanis".

Jinnah, the founder of Pakistan, died in 1948. The in-fighting within the Muslim League started right away after his death and the party factions began to emerge.

Under the premiership of Liaquat Ali Khan, the Muslim League government successfully drafted the Objectives Resolution. Although Liaquat Ali Khan was a progressive, he introduced constitutional reforms in line with religious values and principles. The party however adopted a conservative platform under Khwaja Nazimuddin. Khwaja Nazimuddin opposed equal minority rights and thus, the party lost the support of much of the progressive elite. However, much of his policies were repealed by his successors like Mohammad Ali Bogra and Chaudhry Muhammad Ali, who promoted all sorts of liberties and personal freedom for individuals.

The party's economic policies were pro-capitalist. Prime Ministers like Liaquat Ali Khan and Mohammad Ali Bogra were keen supporters of a Western-style economy and promoted economic liberalism and fiscal conservatism. In the 1950s, Pakistan signed the pro-Capitalist pacts like Central Treaty Organization (CENTO) and Southeast Asia Treaty Organization (SEATO), quenching any possible chance of communist influence in the country. Despite the Muslim League's support for Islam, the party did not take any action against the Usury payments, attracting criticism from religious parties.

=== End of the party ===
Muhammad Ali Jinnah died in September 1948 and Liaquat Ali Khan was assassinated in October 1951. Robbed of its two senior leaders, the Muslim League began to disintegrate. By 1953, dissensions within the Muslim League had led to the formation of several different political parties. Liaquat Ali Khan was succeeded by Khawaja Nazimuddin, a Bengali, who was forced out of office in April 1953. Pakistan was racked by riots in 1953, and in the first national elections in May 1955 (held by a system of indirect voting) the Muslim League was heavily defeated. Iskander Mirza, a veteran Muslim League leader, first became the fourth Governor General and then the President of Pakistan in 1956.

In October 1958, the Pakistan Army seized power and the martial law regime of Muhammad Ayub Khan banned all political parties. The Muslim League ceased to exist and was dissolved.

== Officials ==
=== President ===
Name	Assumed office	Left office	Source
Muhammad Ali Jinnah	1947	1947	
Chaudhry Khaliquzzaman	1948	1950	
Khawaja Nazimuddin	1950	1953	
Mohammad Ali Bogra	1953	1955	
Chaudhri Muhammad Ali	1955	1956	
Abdur Rab Nishtar	1956	1958	

=== General Secretary ===
Name	Assumed office	Left office	Ref
Yusuf Haroon	1956	1958	

== State leaders ==
President of Pakistan
Name	Term in office
Iskander Mirza	1955–1956

Prime Minister of Pakistan
Name	Term in office
Liaquat Ali Khan	1947–1951
Khawaja Nazimuddin	1951–1953
Muhammad Ali Bogra	1953–1955
Chaudhri Muhammad Ali	1955–1956
I. I. Chundrigar	1957

Chief Minister of East Bengal
Name	Term in office
Khwaja Nazimuddin	1947–1948
Nurul Amin	1948–1954

Chief Minister of North-West Frontier Province
Name	Term in office
Abdul Qayyum Khan	1947–1953
Abdur Rashid Khan	1953–1955
Sardar Bahadur Khan	1955

Chief Minister of Punjab
Name	Term in office
Iftikhar Hussain Khan	1947–1949
Mumtaz Daultana	1951–1953
Feroz Khan Noon	1953–1955
Abdul Hamid Khan Dasti	1955

Chief Minister of Sindh
Name	Term in office
Muhammad Ayub Khuhro	1947–1948
Pir Ilahi Bux	1948–1949
Yusuf Haroon	1949–1950
Qazi Fazlullah Ubaidullah	1950–1951
Muhammad Ayub Khuhro	1951
Pirzada Abdul Sattar	1953–1954
Muhammad Ayub Khuhro	1954–1955

== Electoral history ==
Pakistan National Assembly elections

Election	Party leader	Votes	%	Seats	+/–	Position	Government
1947	Muhammad Ali Jinnah			59 / 69	▼14	▼1st	Government
1955	Mohammad Ali Bogra			25 / 72	▼34	▼1st	Coalition

East Pakistan Provincial Assembly elections

Election	Votes	%	Seats	+/–	Position	Government
1954			9 / 237	▼104	▼2nd	Opposition

North-West Frontier Province Provincial Assembly elections

Election	Votes	%	Seats	+/–	Position	Government
1951			67 / 85	▲50	▲1st	Government

Punjab Provincial Assembly elections

Election	Votes	%	Seats	+/–	Position	Government
1951			143 / 192	▲70	▲1st	Government

Sindh Provincial Assembly elections

Election	Votes	%	Seats	+/–	Position	Government
1953			78 / 111	▲50	▲1st	Government

West Pakistan Provincial Assembly elections

Election	Votes	%	Seats	+/–	Position	Government
1956			245 / 310	▲245	▲1st	Government

== Legacy ==
=== Other parties by the same name ===
The name still held great reputation, however, and Ayub Khan later formed a new party, the Convention Muslim League. The opposition faction became known as the Council Muslim League. This latter group joined a united front with other political parties in 1967 in opposition to the regime.

In 1977, Zulfikar Ali Bhutto was removed by General Zia-ul-Haq in the 1977 Pakistani military coup. A new party the Pakistan Muslim League (J) was formed after the death of General and later the President Muhammad Zia-ul-Haq in 1988. Nawaz Sharif formed his own Pakistan Muslim League (N) in 1992, but it had no connection with the original Muslim League. Nawaz Sharif was prime minister from 1990 to 1993 and again from 1997 to 1999, when he was ousted in the 1999 Pakistani coup d'état. At the controversial elections held by the military regime of Pervez Musharraf in October, five different parties using the name Muslim League contested seats. The largest of these, the Pakistan Muslim League (Quaid-e-Azam), won 69 seats out of 272, and the Pakistan Muslim League (Nawaz), loyal to Nawaz Sharif, won 19 seats. After the elections in 2008, Pakistan Muslim League (Q) was in the ruling coalition and Nawaz Sharif's Pakistan Muslim League (N) sat in opposition. In the 2013 elections, Pakistan Muslim League (Nawaz) emerged as the largest party in the country; the party formed its government at the center and Nawaz Sharif was re-elected for third term as Prime Minister of Pakistan.
