= List of political parties in Pakistan =

Pakistan is a de jure multi-party democracy. The country has many political parties and many times in the past the country has been ruled by a coalition government.

The Parliament of Pakistan is bicameral, consisting of the National Assembly of Pakistan and the Senate.

== Brief history and overviews ==
The military-dominated Establishment has directly ruled Pakistan for nearly half of its existence since independence in 1947, while frequently exerting covert dominance over the political leadership during the remainder. The Establishment in Pakistan includes the key decision-makers in the country's military, intelligence and national security services as well as its foreign and domestic policies, including the state policies of aggressive Islamisation during the military dictatorship of General Muhammad Zia-ul-Haq. However, the military establishment later reversed its support of political Islam under General Pervez Musharraf, who pursued enlightened moderation in the early 2000s.

Until 1990, the Pakistan Peoples Party (PPP) was the only major party in Pakistan. After Zulfiqar Ali Bhutto died, Benazir Bhutto took control and they remained in a strong position throughout Pakistan. In 1990, Nawaz Sharif of Islami Jamhuri Ittihad (IJI) won the elections. After the IJI dissolved and Nawaz Sharif founded the Pakistan Muslim League (N), the PPP and PML(N) emerged as the two major parties in Pakistan. In 1993, the PPP won the elections again. In 1996, the Pakistan Tehreek-e-Insaf (PTI) was formed. In 2013, the PTI took part in the elections and won 35 seats in the National Assembly of Pakistan. After the 2018 general elections, the PTI formed the government and became one of the three major parties in Pakistan.

In 2020, Pakistan Democratic Movement (PDM) was formed by many parties as a movement against then prime minister Imran Khan. Following Imran Khan's removal, political unrest broke out throughout the country and in the events leading up to the 2024 general elections, many new parties were formed. The country's largest party, the Pakistan Tehreek-e-Insaf, would be subject to legal challenges and an alleged crackdown, subsequently being forced to register with their alliance member, the Sunni Ittehad Council after the Election Commission of Pakistan (ECP) removed its electoral symbol and prohibited it from nominating candidates for the 226 reserved seats in the central and provincial legislatures.

The Pakistan Muslim League - Nawaz is a Pakistani conservative political party that was founded in 1993 by senior politician, Nawaz Sharif. The party was founded as an offshoot of the Pakistan Muslim League, but is now its largest faction. It is currently still led by its founder Nawaz Sharif and is ideologically conservative as well as shares similarities with Nawaz's previous party, the IJI. It saw rapid growth under Nawaz Sharif in the 1990s as it entered a two-party system with alongside the Pakistan People's Party and the Pakistan Tehreek-e-Insaf. It is also advocates for economic privatization, as Nawaz himself was a business owner. The party follows a free market capitalist and economically liberalist approach. It has developed a somewhat ideology around its leader Nawaz Sharif and has been led by members of the Sharif family. It has been right-wing for most of its existence but has shifted to a center-right position in recent years. It holds is base of power in Sindh, more specifically Karachi and Punjab, more specifically Lahore and Gilgit-Baltistan, Azad Kashmir, Balochistan, has had 3 different prime ministers including Nawaz himself who served for the longest non-consecutive time (9 years). The prime ministers from the PML-N include Nawaz Sharif (3 terms) and Nawaz's younger brother, Shehbaz Sharif (2 terms), who is serving right now.

The Pakistan People's Party is a political party founded in 1967 by statesman, barrister and senior politician, Zulfikar Ali Bhutto. The party was founded on the premise of bringing change to Pakistan and to bring a new face to Pakistani politics, as when the party was founded alongside the PML-N and PTI ruled Pakistan in a de-facto two party system. It is by far the oldest out of the top ruling parties in Pakistan and was the first Pakistani political party to lay out a manifesto and ideology. It was founded on the premise of socialism and to struggle against the military rule of Field Marshal Ayub Khan (1958-1969). It has also been characterized as Pakistan's first democratic party and has been left-wing for most of its existence with its founder, Zulfikar Ali Bhutto being a left-wing populist, though in the 21st century it has shifted to a center-left position. Zulfikar ruled Pakistan from 1971 until 1977, when he was overthrown and later hanged in 1979. The party has been widely seen as a dynastic political family party as it has seen its leadership pass down through the Bhutto family, which has seen a devoted cult of personality. After Zulfikar's death the party abandoned its socialist ideology and instead shifted to progressivism under Zulfikar's daughter, Benazir Bhutto. Benazir would be assassinated in 2007 and since then the party has been controlled by her husband, Asif Ali Zardari as well as her son, Bilawal Bhutto Zardari. The party remains a beacon of liberalism and progressive values in a country that is drowning in extremist and right-wing rhetoric within mainstream politics. Its main base of power is Balochistan and Sindh. The PPP is led by the Central Executive Committee and has seen 4 different prime ministers including: Zulfikar Ali Bhutto (1973-1977), Benazir Bhutto (1988-1990, 1993-1996), Yusuf Raza Gillani (2008-2012) and Raja Pervaiz Ashraf (2012-2013).

The Pakistan Tehreek-e-Insaf is a right-wing political party founded in 1996 by cricketer-turned-politician, Imran Khan. The party was founded on the premise of bringing change to Pakistan and to bring a new face to Pakistani politics, as when the party was founded alongside the PPP and PML-N ruled Pakistan in a de-facto two party system. It advocates for welfarism and has promoted turning Pakistan into a modern welfare state. It has often seen populism around Imran Khan, a former cricket star. It launched a large-scale anti-corruption campaign across Pakistan in the 2000s and 2010s which led to its victory in the 2018 Pakistani general election. It holds its base of power in Khyber Pakhtunkhwa and Gilgit-Baltistan but also holds significant popularity and influence across western Sindh and Punjab, where Imran Khan is from. It has been widely seen as an anti-establishment party since 2022 as it clashed with Pakistan's military establishment. It was founded as a right-wing party, and is the most right-wing of Pakistan's main political parties. Khan has expressed rhetoric that borders on extremism at times, such as his apologist approach to the Afghan Taliban (earning him the moniker Taliban Khan) and his victim blaming after the Motorway rape incident. Besides this it has advocated for rule of law and constitutionalism as part of its political alliance, the Tehreek Tahafuz Ayin. Despite being the largest political party in Pakistan in terms of membership, and in the top 10 largest parties worldwide, it has only had one prime minister, being Imran Khan himself who served for one term.

The Jamiat Ulema-e-Islam – F is a Islamic fundamentalist Pakistan political landscape includes a significant number of religion political parties. roughly 25 have Islamist or sectarian names, reflecting their religious affiliations. ‘Notable among them are the JUI-F Jamiat Ulema-i-Islam – Fazl, the mainstream founded alongside the Pakistan People's Party, Pakistan Muslim League (N), and the Pakistan Tehreek-e-Insaf, three of which actively participated in the February 8, [2024] polls. Established as the Jamiat Ulema-e-Islam in 1945, it is the result of a factional split in 1988 with 'F' standing for the name of its leader, Fazal-ur-Rehman.

It has been called "the biggest religio-political party" in Pakistan, with the largest "proven street power", among all the political and religious parties of Pakistan. At the time of its inception it was based in southern Khyber Pakhtunkhwa which are mostly inhabited by Pashtuns, but over the years it has cemented its electoral base into Balochistan, Sindh and Punjab. The JUI–F is the largest splinter group of the original JUI, which split into two factions in 1980 over the policy of Pakistani president Zia-ul-Haq of supporting Mujahideen outfits in the Afghanistan war. The other faction, the much smaller JUI–S, led by Samiul Haq, is of regional significance in Khyber Pakhtunkhwa. Two other small splinter groups are the Jamiat Ulama-e-Islam Nazryati (JUI–N) which split off in 2007, but merged back into JUI–F in 2016; and Rabita Jamiat Ulema-e-Islam, led by Muhammad Khan Sherani which broke off Sherani announces new faction, lashes out at JUI (F) chief

=== Punjab ===
Punjab is generally considered as the most important political province and has been used by major parties such as the PML(N) and PTI in the past to gain legitimacy and as a political stronghold. The Punjab provincial assembly has usually been split between the Pakistan Muslim League N (PML-N) and the Pakistan Tehreek-e-Insaf (PTI).

=== Sindh ===
Sindh has been used as a political stronghold for the PAK DEFENCE QOUMI MOVEMENT (PDQM), Pakistan Muslim League N (PML-N) Pakistan People's Party (PPP) and Pakistan Tehreek-e-Insaf (PTI) since the party's creation. The PTI, PML(N) & PPP has almost always won landslide victories in provincial elections in Sindh, and has almost always held the province's seats. Throughout the early 2000s the PML-Q saw minor successes in Sindh, but the province quickly came under the control of the PML(N) PPP and PTI again. The PPP and PML(N) good governance by several Sindhi parties, leading to the creation of the Grand Democratic Alliance (GDA), a coalition of several anti-PPP parties, although the PML(N) PTI and PPP still holds sweeping majorities in Sindhi provincial seats.

=== Khyber Pakhtunkhwa (KPK) ===
Khyber Pakhtunkhwa is full of Pashtun nationalist and regionalist parties favoring Afghan tribalism, such as the PML(N) the PPP the ANP and PMAP. The region has also been full of religious parties, like the PML(N) the PPP the JUI-F especially throughout the north western areas near Afghanistan. There are several political parties in KPK, and most of them favor Pashtun nationalism with feudal aspects, but ever since Imran Khan's entrance into politics, the PTI has almost always won landslide election victories in the province and has KPK as a political stronghold and base of power.

=== Balochistan ===
The province of Balochistan, Pakistan is full of Baloch nationalist parties, with some demanding autonomy for Balochistan, and some extreme groups demanding secession from Pakistan. Most parties from Balochistan follow the same pattern as Khyber Pakhtunkhwa, high levels of regionalism and ethnic nationalism, with most ethnic nationalists being left-wing, as well as right-wing religious groups usually gaining victories near the Afghan border. Balochistan is the only province in which no party regularly gains a clear majority, and the provincial assembly is usually split between Baloch nationalist parties.

=== Gilgit-Baltistan ===
The Pakistan Peoples Party won the first Gilgit-Baltistan elections and was the only major party of Gilgit-Baltistan with 20 seats out of 33. However, in 2015, Pakistan Muslim League (N) won 15 seats and became the major party of Gilgit-Baltistan and PPP only received one seat in the Gilgit-Baltistan Assembly. However, in the 2020 and 2026 elections, Pakistan Tehreek-e-Insaf (PTI) won 16 seats and became the only major party of Gilgit-Baltistan with PPP winning 3 and PML(N) winning two seats.

=== Azad Kashmir ===
The Pakistan Peoples Party won the first Azad Kashmir elections and was the only major party of Azad Jammu and Kashmir with 20 seats out of 33. However, in 2015, Pakistan Muslim League (N) won 15 seats and became the major party of Azad Kashmir and PPP only received one seat in the Azad Kashmir Legislative Assembly. However, in the 2020 and 2026 elections, Pakistan Tehreek-e-Insaf (PTI) won 16 seats and became the only major party of Azad Jammu and Kashmir with PPP winning 3 and PML(N) winning two seats.

== Parties in Parliament (Note: National Assembly and/or the Senate) ==
Party	Abbr.	Flag	Founded	Political position	Leader	Ideology	National Assembly (Note: The current national assembly in Pakistan is under severe allegations of rigging, fraud and electoral misconduct to learn more see Allegations of rigging in the 2024 Pakistani general election)	Senate
Pakistan Muslim League – Nawaz پاکستان مسلم لیگ – ن	PML–N		1993	Centre to centre-right	Nawaz Sharif	Conservatism (Pakistani); Fiscal conservatism; Liberal conservatism	131 / 336	19 / 96
Pakistan People's Party پاکستان پیپلز پارٹی	PPP		1967	Centre to centre-left	Bilawal Bhutto Zardari	Democratic socialism; Islamic socialism; Third Way	74 / 336	26 / 96
Muttahida Qaumi Movement – Pakistan متحدہ قومی موومنٹ پاکستان	MQM–P		2016	Centre-left	Khalid Maqbool Siddiqui	Muhajir nationalism; Secularism	22 / 336	4 / 96
Jamiat Ulema-e-Islam – F (Note: Officially registered by Election Commission of Pakistan as Jamiat Ulema-e-Islam Pakistan) جمیعت علمائے اسلام (ف)	JUI–F		1980	Far-right	Fazal-ur-Rahman	Islamic fundamentalism; Deobandism; Islamism	10 / 336	6 / 96
Pakistan Tehreek-e-Insaf پاکستان تحريکِ انصاف	PTI		1996	Centre	Gohar Ali Khan	Populism; Secularism	0 / 336	14 / 95
Pakistan Muslim League – Quaid (Note: Officially registered by Election Commission of Pakistan as Pakistan Muslim League) پاکستان مسلم لیگ (ق)	PML–Q		2002	Centre to centre-right	Shujaat Hussain	Conservatism; (Pakistani); Moderate conservatism; Third Way	5 / 336	1 / 96
Istehkam-e-Pakistan Party استحکامِ پاکستان	IPP		2023	Radical centre	Aleem Khan	Populism	4 / 336	0 / 96
Awami National Party عوامی نيشنل پارٹی	ANP		1986	Centre-left to left-wing	Aimal Wali Khan	Socialism; Liberalism; Pashtun nationalism	0 / 336	3 / 96
Sunni Ittihad Council سنی اتحاد کونسل	SIC		2009	Right-wing	Hamid Raza	Sunni Islam; Barelvi faith; Religious politics	1 / 336	0 / 96
Pakhtunkhwa National People's Party پښتونخوا ملي عوامي ګوند	PkMAP		1989	Centre-left to left-wing	Mahmood Khan Achakzai	Democratic socialism; Pashtun nationalism	1 / 336	0 / 96
National Party نيشنل پارٹی	NP		2003	Centre-left	Abdul Malik Baloch	Baloch nationalism; Social democracy	1 / 336	1 / 96
Balochistan National Party بلوچستان نيشنل پارٹی	BNP		1996	Left-wing	Akhtar Mengal	Democratic socialism; Baloch nationalism	1 / 336	1 / 96
Balochistan People's Party بلوچستان عوامی پارٹی	BAP		2018	Centre	Khalid Hussain Magsi	Progressivism; Federalism	1 / 336	4 / 96
Majlis Wahdat-e-Muslimeen مجلس وحدتِ مسلمین	MWM		2009	Centre (Note: Officially the MWM states that it is politically aligned with the PTI at the Centre, but the party has also been considered as Right-wing due to its emphasis on religious values.)	Raja Nasir Abbas	Islamic democracy; Islamic socialism; Shia-Sunni unity	1 / 336	1 / 96
Pakistan Muslim League – Zia پاکستان مسلم لیگ (ض)	PML–Z		2002	Far-right	Ijaz-ul-Haq	Ziaism; Islamism	1 / 336	0 / 96
Independents آزاد اراکین	IND	N/A					79 / 336	1 / 96

== Provincial Assembly members ==
This is the list of parties that are currently represented in any of the 5 Provincial Assemblies of Pakistan, which includes, the Provincial assembly in Provincial Assembly of Sindh, Provincial Assembly of the Punjab, Provincial Assembly of Balochistan, Provincial Assembly of Khyber Pakhtunkhwa, Gilgit-Baltistan Assembly, and Azad Kashmir Assembly.

Party	Abbr.	Flag	Balochistan	Khyber Pakhtunkhwa	Punjab	Sindh	Gilgit-Baltistan	Azad Kashmir
Pakistan Muslim League (N) پاکستان مسلم لیگ (ن)	PML(N)		17 / 65	9 / 145	203 / 371	10 / 371	9 / 33	31 / 53
Pakistan People's Party پاکستان پیپلز پارٹی	PPP		17 / 65	5 / 145	17 / 371	120 / 168	14 / 33	14 / 53
Jamiat Ulema-e-Islam – F جمیعت علمائے اسلام (ف); Assembly of Islamic Clerics (F)	JUI–F		14 / 65	9 / 145	—N/a	—N/a	—N/a	—N/a
Muttahida Qaumi Movement – Pakistan متحدہ قومی موومنٹ پاکستان; United National Movement – Pakistan	MQM–P		—N/a	—N/a	—N/a	43 / 168	—N/a	—N/a
Awami National Party عوامی نيشنل پارٹی	ANP		3 / 65	2 / 145	—N/a	—N/a	—N/a	—N/a
Pakistan Muslim League – Quaid پاکستان مسلم لیگ (ق)	PML–Q		—N/a	—N/a	10 / 371	—N/a	—N/a	—N/a
Istehkam-e-Pakistan Party استحکامِ پاکستان; Pakistan Stability Party	IPP		—N/a	—N/a	8 / 371	—N/a	7 / 33	—N/a
Balochistan National Party بلوچستان نيشنل پارٹی	BNP		1 / 65	—N/a	—N/a	—N/a	—N/a	—N/a
Balochistan Awami Party بلوچستان عوامی پارٹی	BAP		5 / 65	—N/a	—N/a	—N/a	—N/a	—N/a
National Party نيشنل پارٹی; Nīšonal Pārṭī	NP		4 / 65	—N/a	—N/a	—N/a	—N/a	—N/a
Majlis Wahdat-e-Muslimeen مجلس وحدت مسلمین; Muslim Unity Assembly	MWM		—N/a	—N/a	1 / 371	—N/a	1 / 33	—N/a
Pakistan Muslim League (Z) پاکستان مسلم لیگ ضیاء	MWM		—N/a	—N/a	1 / 371	—N/a	—N/a	—N/a
Parties that are unrepresented in the Parliament and are only represented through Provincial assemblies
Grand Democratic Alliance گرانڈ جمہوری اتحاد	GDA		—N/a	—N/a	—N/a	3 / 168	—N/a	—N/a
Pakistan Tehreek-e-Insaf Parliamentarians پاکستان تحریکِ انصاف پارلیمنٹرینز; Pakistan Movement for Justice Parliamentarians	PTI-P		—N/a	4 / 145	—N/a	—N/a	—N/a	—N/a
Jamaat-e-Islami Pakistan جماعتِ اسلامی; Islamic Party	JIP		1 / 65	—N/a	—N/a	1 / 168	—N/a	—N/a
Tehreek-e-Labbaik Pakistan تحریک لبیک پاکستان; Here-I-Am Movement Pakistan	TLP		—N/a	—N/a	3 / 371	—N/a	—N/a	—N/a
Balochistan National Party (Awami) بلوچستان نیشنل پارٹی (عوامی)	BNP–A		1 / 65	—N/a	—N/a	—N/a	—N/a	—N/a
Haq Do Tehreek Balochistan حق دو تحریک، بلوچستان; Give Rights Movement Balochistan	HDTB		1 / 65	—N/a	—N/a	—N/a	—N/a	—N/a
Jammu and Kashmir Awami Dast-o-Bazu جموں و کشمیر عوامی دست و بازو; Jammu and Kashmir People's Hand and Arm	JKADB		—N/a	—N/a	—N/a	—N/a	—N/a	1 / 53
Independents آزاد اراکین	IND	—N/a	—N/a	92 / 145	97 / 371	3 / 168	1 / 33	—N/a

== Unrepresented parties ==
This is the list of registered parties that are currently unrepresented in Parliament and any of the provincial assemblies of Pakistan since 2024 to 2026 and Azad Kashmiri general election.

Party	Abbr.	Flag	Est.	Political position	Leader	Core ideology
Allah-o-Akbar Tehreek الله اکبر تحریک; God is Great Movement	AAT				Muhammad Aslam Rabbani	Islamism
Awaam Pakistan عوام پاکستان; People Pakistan	AP		2024	Big tent	Shahid Khaqan Abbasi	Civic nationalism
Awami Muslim League (Pakistan) عوامی مسلم لیگ پاکستان; Awāmī Musallam League Pākistān	AML		2008	Centrism	Shaikh Rasheed Ahmad	Mass politics
Awami Tahreek عوامی تحریک; People's Movement	QAT		1970	Left-wing to far-left	Wasand Thari	Communism; Left-wing populism Marxism–Leninism–Maoism; Progressivism; Secularism; Sindhi nationalism (Left-wing nationalism); Socialism
Awami Workers Party عوامی ورکرز پارٹی; People's Workers Party	AWP		2012	Left-wing	Akhtar Hussain	Worker's rights
Barabri Party Pakistan برابری پارٹی پاکستان; Equality Party Pakistan	BPP		2018	Left-wing	Jawad Ahmad	Social egalitarianism
Haqooq-e-Khalq Party حقوقِ خلق پارٹی پاکستان; Rights of the People Party	HKP		2022	Left-wing	Ammar Ali Jan	Socialism
Hazara Democratic Party ہزارہ ڈیموکریٹک پارٹی	HDP		2003	Centre-left	Abdul Khaliq Hazara	Democratic socialism Hazara nationalism Social democracy
Jamhoori Wattan Party جمہوری وطن پارٹی; Republican Nation Party	JWP		1990	Centre-left to left-wing	Shahzain Bugti	Baloch nationalism
Markazi Jamiat Ahle Hadith (Note: Officially registered by Election Commission of Pakistan as Markazi Jamiat Ahl-e-Hadith Pakistan) جمیعت اہلِ حدیث المركزى جمعية اهلحديث الباكستان; Assembly of People of Hadith	JAH		1986	Far-right	Hafiz Abdul Kareem	Ahl-i Hadith
Jamiat Ulema-e-Pakistan (Imam Noorani) جمعیت علماء پاکستان (امام نورانی); Assembly of Clerics of Pakistan (Imam Noorani)	JUP-IN		1948	Right-wing	Shah Owais Noorani	Islamism
Jamiat Ulema-e-Pakistan (Noorani) جمعیت علماء پاکستان (نورانی); Assembly of Clerics of Pakistan (Noorani)	JUP-N		1948		Abul Khair Muhammad Zubair	Islamism
Jamiat Ulema-e-Islam (S) جمعیت علمائے اسلام (س); Assembly of Clerics of Islam (S)	JUI-S		1980	Far-right	Abdul Haq Sani	Deobandi movement
Jamote Qaumi Movement جاموٹ قومی موومنٹ; Jamote People's Movement	JQM		1996		Mir Abdul Majid Abro	Jamote nationalism
Mohajir Qaumi Movement – Haqiqi مہاجر قومی موومنٹ حقیقی; Muhajir People's Movement – True	MQM-H		1992	Centre-left	Afaq Ahmed	Liberal socialism; Muhajir nationalism; (Civic nationalism); Secularism; Social liberalism
Mustaqbil Pakistan مستقبل پاکستان; Future Pakistan	MP		2010		Nadeem Mumtaz Qureshi	Reformism
National Democratic Movement ملي جمهوري غورځنګ; Millī Jumhūrī Ghōrźang قومی جمہوری تحریک	NDM		2021	Centre-left	Mohsin Dawar	Anti-authoritarianism; Federalism; Pashtun nationalism (Left-wing nationalism); Progressivism; Regionalism; Secularism; Social democracy
National Democratic Party نیشنل ڈیموکریٹک پارٹی	NDP		2018		—	
Pakistan Awami Tehreek پاکستان عوامی تحريک; Pakistan People's Movement	PAT		1989	Centrism; Fiscal: Centre-left; Social: Centre-right	Muhammad Tahir-ul-Qadri	Moderate Islam
Pakistan Falah Party پاکستان فلاح پارٹی; Pakistan People's Movement	PFP		2011			
Pakistan Justice and Democratic Party پاکستان جسٹس وڈیموکریٹک پارٹی	PJDP		2015		Iftikhar Muhammad Chaudhry	Liberal democracy
Pakistan Muslim League (J) پاکستان مسلم لیگ (ج)	PML-J		1988		Muhammad Iqbal Dar	Pakistani nationalism
Pakistan Peoples Party (Shaheed Bhutto) پاکستان پیپلز پارٹی (شہید بھٹو) پيپلزپارٽي شهيدڀٽو	PPP-S		1997	Left-wing	Ghinwa Bhutto	Bhuttoism; Democratic socialism Left-wing populism Pakistani nationalism (Left-wing nationalism Progressivism; Secularism
Pakistan Peoples Party Workers پاکستان پیپلز پارٹی ورکرز	PPP-W		2014	Centre-left	Safdar Ali Abbasi	Left-wing populism Social democracy
Pakistan Rah-e-Haq Party پاکستان راہِ حق پارٹیي; Pakistan Path of Truth Party	PRHP		2012	Far-right	Ibrahim Khan Qasmi	Islamic fundamentalism
Pakistan Sunni Tehreek پاکستان سنی تحریک; Pakistan Sunni Movement	PST		1990	Far-right	Sarwat Ejaz Qadri	Barelvi Sunnism
Pakistan Tehreek-e-Insaf Nazriati پاکستان تحریک انصاف نظریاتی; Pakistan Movement for Justice – Ideological	PTI-N		2012		Akhtar Iqbal Dar	
Pasban-e-Pakistan (Note: Officially registered by Election Commission of Pakistan as Pasban Democratic Party) پاسبان پاکستان; Guardians of Pakistan	PP		2015	Single-issue	Altaf Shakoor	Social justice
Pashtunkhwa National Awami Party Pakistan پشتونخوا نیشنل عوامی پارٹی; Pashtunkhwa National People's Party	PKNAP		2022	Left-wing	Khushal Khan Kakar	Pashtun nationalism; Egalitarianism
Qaumi Awami Tahreek قومی عوامی تحریک; National People's Movement	QAT		1970	Left-wing to far-left	Ayaz Latif Palijo	Left-wing nationalism
Qaumi Watan Party قومی وطن پارٹی قومي وطن ګوند; National Homeland Party	QWP		2012	Centre-left	Aftab Ahmad Sherpao	Pashtun neo-nationalism
Rabita Jamiat Ulema-e-Islam رابطہ جمعیت علمائے اسلام; Associated Assembly of Clerics of Islam	RJUI		2020	Far-right	Muhammad Khan Sherani	Deobandi clericalism
Sindh United Party سندھ یونائیٹڈ پارٹی سنڌ يونائيٽڊ پارٽي	SUP		2006		Syed Jalal Mehmood Shah	Sindhi nationalism
Tabdeeli Pasand Party Pakistan تبدیلی پسند پارٹی پاکستان; Reformist Party of Pakistan	TPPP		2012		Ali Kazi	Good governance

== Dissolved parties ==
Party	Abbr.	Flag	Founded	Dissolved	Political position	Founder/Leader(s)
All Pakistan Awami Muslim League آل پاکستان عوامی مسلم لیگ নিখিল পাকিস্তান আওয়ামী মুসলিম লীগ	AL		1950	1971		Huseyn Shaheed Suhrawardy
All Pakistan Muslim League آل پاکستان مسلم لیگ	APML		2010	2023	Centre to centre-right	Pervez Musharraf
Awami Jamhuri Ittehad Pakistan عوامی جمهوری اتحاد; People's Democratic Alliance Pakistan	AJIP		2012	2015		Liaqat Khan Tarakai
Awami Raj Party (Note: It was officially registered by Election Commission of Pakistan as Pakistan Awami Raj) عوامی راج پارٹی; People's Rule Party	ARJ			2023		Jamshed Dasti
Azad Pakistan Party آزاد پاکستان پارٹی; Free Pakistan Party	APP		1949	1957	Left-wing	Mian Iftikharuddin
Combined Opposition Parties اپوزیشن جماعتوں کی مشترکہ	COP		1965	1965	Big tent	Fatima Jinnah
Communist Mazdoor Kissan Party کمیونسٹ مزدور کسان پارٹی; Communist Workers and Farmers Party	CMKP		1995	2015	Far-left	
Convention Muslim League کنونشن مسلم لیگ	ML-C		1962	1970s		Chaudhry Khaliquzzaman
Council Muslim League کونسل مسلم لیگ	ML-Co		1962	1970s		Khawaja Nazimuddin
Ganatantri Dal গণতন্ত্রী দল; Democratic Party	GD		1953	1957		Mahmud Ali; Haji Mohammad Danesh
Islami Jamhoori Ittehad اسلامی جمہوری اتحاد; Islamic Democratic Alliance	IJI		1988	1990	Right-wing	Nawaz Sharif
Jamiat Ulama-e-Islam Nazryati جمعیت علمائے اسلام (نظریاتی); Assembly of Islamic Clerics – Ideological	JUI-N		2007	2016		Maulvi Asmatullah
Jamiat Ulema-e-Islam جمیعت علمائے اسلام; Assembly of Islamic Clerics	JUI		1945	1980		Shabbir Ahmad Usmani
Jinnah Muslim League جناح مسلم لیگ	JML		1949	1953		Iftikhar Hussain Khan Mamdot
Khaksar movement تحریکِ خاکسار	KM		1931	1970s		Inayatullah Khan Mashriqi
Krishak Sramik Party کسان ورکرز پارٹی কৃষক শ্রমিক পার্টি	KSP		1929	1971	Centre-left	A. K. Fazlul Huq
Labour Party Pakistan لیبر پارٹی پاکستان	LPP		1986	2012	Left-wing to far-left	
Millat Party ملت پارٹی; Nation Party	MP		1997	2004		Farooq Leghari
Muttahida Qaumi Movement – London متحدہ قومی موومنٹ لندن; Muttaḥidah Qọ̄mī Mūwmaṅṫ; United National Movement – London	MQM-L		1984	2025	Center-left to centre	Altaf Hussain
Muslim League مسلم لیگ মুসলিম লীগ	ML		1947	1958	Big tent	Muhammad Ali Jinnah
National Awami Party نیشنل عوامی پارٹی ন্যাশনাল আওয়ামী পার্টি	NAP		1957	1962	Left-wing	Abdul Hamid Khan Bhashani
National Awami Party (Wali) نیشنل عوامی پارٹی (ولي); National People's Party (Wali)	NAP-W		1967	1986	Left-wing	Khan Abdul Wali Khan
National Peoples Party نیشنل پیپلز پارٹی	NPP		1986	2018		Mustafa Jatoi
National Workers Party نیشنل ورکرز پارٹی	NWP		1999	2010	Left-wing	Abid Hassan Minto
Pakistan Democratic Party پاکستان جمہوری پارٹی	PDP		1967	2012		Nawabzada Nasrullah Khan
Pakistan Hindu Party پاکستان ہندو پارٹی	PHP		1990			Rana Chandra Singh
Pakistan Mazdoor Kissan Party پاکستان مزدور کسان پارٹی; Pakistan Labourers and Farmers Party	PMKP		1974	2015		Afzal Shah Khamosh
Pakistan Muslim League پاکستان مسلم لیگ	PML		1962 (Note: See First phase (1962–1969)); 1969 (Note: See Second phase (1969–1977)); 1977 (Note: See Third phase (1977–1985))	1969; 1977; 1985		Ayub Khan
Pakistan Muslim League (Jinnah) پاکستان مسلم لیگ (جناح)	PML-J		1995	2004		Manzoor Wattoo
Pakistan Muslim League (Qayyum) پاکستان مسلم ليگ (قيوم)	PML-Qy		1970	1993		Abdul Qayyum Khan
Pakistan Peoples Muslim League پاکستان پیپلز مسلم لیگ	PPML		2009	2013		Arbab Ghulam Rahim
Pakistan People's Party Parliamentarian (Patriots)	PPP-PP		2002	2017		Rao Sikander Iqbal; Faisal Saleh Hayat
Pakistan Socialist Party پاکستان سوشلسٹ پارٹی	PSP		1948	1958	Left-wing	
Pakistan Tehreek-e-Insaf (Gulalai) (Note: It was officially registered by Election Commission of Pakistan as Jamaat-e-Suffah) پاکستان تحريکِ انصاف (گلالئی); Pakistan Movement for Justice (Gulalai)	PTI-G		2018	2023		Ayesha Gulalai
Pak Sarzameen Party پاک سر زمین پارٹی; Pure Homeland Party	PSP		2016	2023	Centre-left	Mustafa Kamal
Pukhtoonkhwa Mazdoor Kissan Party پختونخواہ مزدور کسان پارٹی; Pakhtunkhwa Labourers and Farmers Party	PkMKP		1979	1989		Sher Ali Bacha
Qaumi Inqilabi Party قومی الانقلابی پارٹی; National Revolutionary Party	QIP		1987		Left-wing	
Republican Party ریپبلکن پارٹی	RP		1955	1958	Centre-right	Feroz Khan Noon
Sindh Awami Ittehad سندھ عوامي اتحاد سنڌ عوامي اتحاد; Sindh People's Alliance	SAI		2012	2017		Liaquat Ali Jatoi
Sindh Hari Committee سنڌ هاري ڪاميٽي; Sindh Farmer Committee	SHC		1930		Left-wing	G. M. Syed
Sindh Mohajir Punjabi Pathan Muttahida Mahaz سندھ مہاجر پنجابی پٹھان متحدہ محاذ; Sindh Muhajir Punjabi Pashtun United Front	SMPPMM		1969			Nawab Muzaffar Khan
Sindh National Front سندھ نیشنل فرنٹ سنڌ نيشنل فرنٽ	SNF		1989	2017		Mumtaz Bhutto
Tehreek-e-Istiqlal تحریک استقلال; Solidarity Movement	TI		1970	2012		Asghar Khan
Tehreek-e-Jafaria تحریک جعفریہ پاکستان; Movement for Shia Law	TJ		1979		Far-right	Arif Hussain Hussaini
Tehreek-e-Tahaffuz-e-Pakistan تحریک تحفظ پاکستان; Movement for the Protection of Pakistan	TTP		2012	2013	Centre	Abdul Qadeer Khan
Workers Party Pakistan ورکرز پارٹی پاکستان	WPP		2010	2012	Far-left	Abid Hassan Minto

== Unregistered parties ==
Party	Abbr.	Flag	Date of foundation	Political position	Leader(s)
Mazdoor Kisan Party مزدور کسان پارٹی; Workers and Peasants Party	MKP		1968	Far-left	Afzal Shah Khamosh
Pakistan Christian Congress پاکستان کرسچین کانگریس	PCC		1985	Centre-right	Nazir S Bhatti
Sindh Taraqi Pasand Party سنڌ ترقي پسند پارٽي سندھ ترقی پسند پارٹی; Sindh Progressive Party	STP		1991	Left-wing	Qadir Magsi
Pakistan Green Party پاکستان گرین پارٹی	PGP		2002	Green	Liaquat Ali Shaikh
Communist Party of Pakistan کمیونسٹ پارٹی آف پاکستان	CPP		1948	Far-left	Jameel Ahmad Malik
Pakistan Social Democratic Party پاکستان سوشل ڈیموکریٹک پارٹی	PSDP		2002	Centre-left	Mujeeb ur Rehman Kiani
Communist Party of Pakistan (Thaheem) کمیونسٹ پارٹی آف پاکستان (تھہیم)	CPP		2002	Far-left	Khadim Thaheem
Bahawalpur National Awami Party بہاولپور نیشنل عوامی پارٹی; Bahawalpur National People's Party	BNAP		2010		Nawab Salahuddin Abbasi
Gilgit-Baltistan United Movement	GBUM		—	—	—
All Pakistan Minorities Alliance آل پاکستان اقلیتی اتحاد	APML				Paul Bhatti
Pakistan Republic Party پاکستان ریپبلک پارٹی	PRP		2025	Centre-left	Reham Khan
Pakistan Rights Movement پاکستان رائٹس موومنٹ	PRM		2026	Centre-right	Mushtaq Ahmed Khan
Pakistan Awaam Raaj Tehreek پاکستان عوام راج تحریک	PART		2026	Centre	Iqrar Ul Hassan

== See also ==
- Politics of Pakistan
- List of ruling political parties by country
