= Socialism in Pakistan =

The influences of socialism and socialist movements in Pakistan have taken many different forms as a counterpart to political conservatism, from the groups like The Revolutionary (Inqalabi) Communist Party, which is the Pakistani section of the Revolutionary Communist International, to Marxist-Leninists group like Communist Party through to the reformist electoral project enshrined in the birth of the Pakistan People's Party (PPP) and the Pakistan Tehreek-e-Insaf (PTI).

While capitalism has always held its sway, the prevalence of the socialist ideology has nevertheless continued to be found in a number of instances in Pakistan's political past and prominent personalities. Much of the remaining socialism in Pakistan today accedes to the idea of Islamic left (socialism and communism), where the state would be run in a socialist set-up consistent with Islamic political principles, while other proponents demand pure socialism.

== History ==
=== Political background ===
The socialist movements in British Indian Empire began with the Russian Revolution, and the subsequent Soviet people's immigration to North-Western areas into territory (now Pakistan) held by British Empire, in 1922-27. The British authorities were terrified after revealing the attempted series of revolts against the British Empire, known as Peshawar Conspiracy Cases.

=== 1947–50s: early Marxism ===
Independence and class struggle.

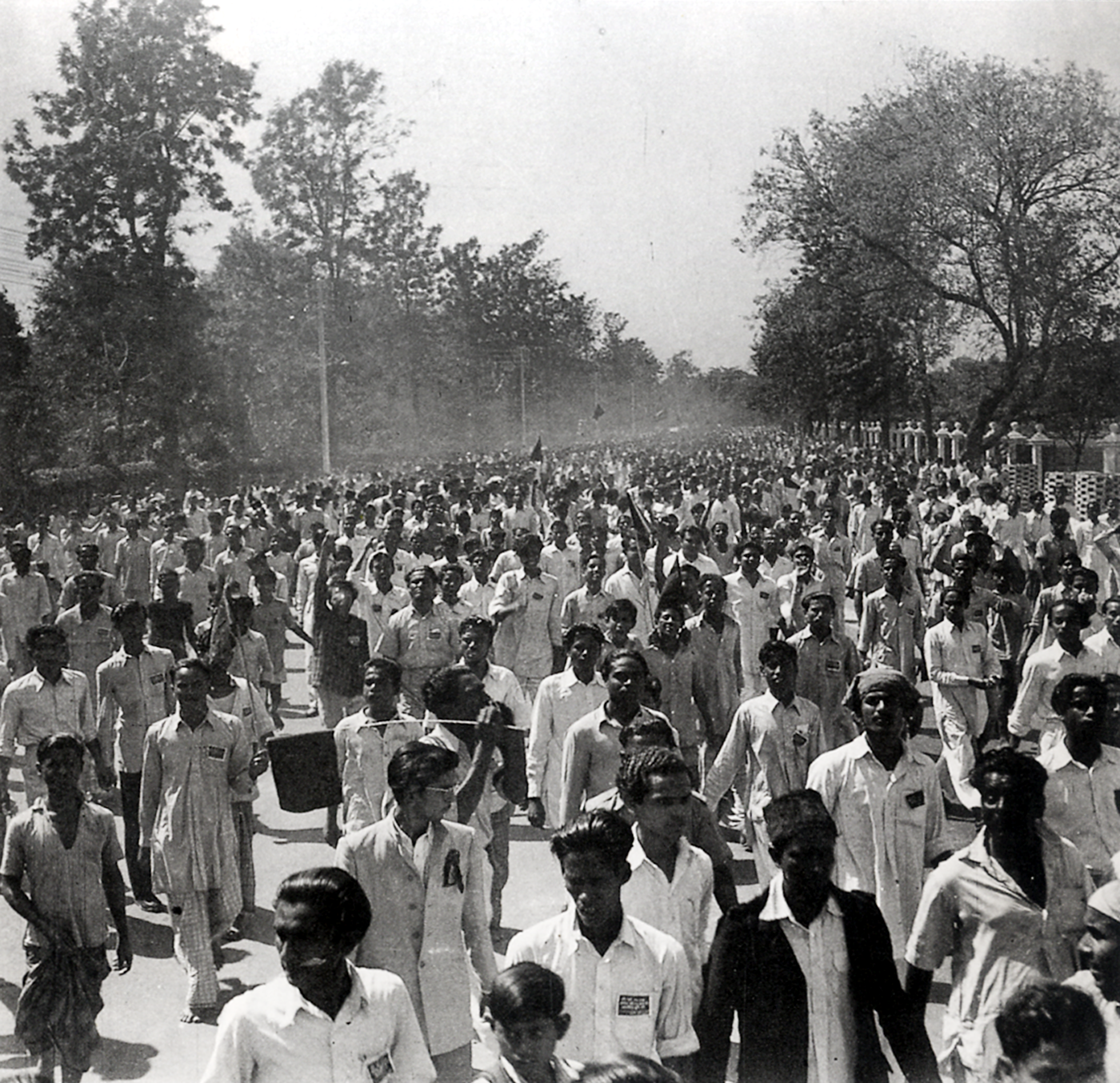
The communist parties played an influential role in staging the massive protests for the Bengali language movement which led the destruction of PML in East Pakistan, 1950s.

Immediately after the establishment of Pakistan on 14 August 1947 which was achieved by a political party, Muslim League led by Muhammad Ali Jinnah, the struggle for left-wing orientation began as a failure of the military campaign with the Republic of India. After Jinnah's death in 1948, the clash ideologies and political disagreements began when Prime Minister Liaquat Ali Khan consolidated his position more densely. The Pakistan Socialist Party (PSP) was the only socialist party of its time, and was active in both East Pakistan and West Pakistan. The Socialist Party was generally a secular party which had first opposed the idea of the partition of India. The Socialist Party found it difficult to compete with the conservatives and other right-wing groups. The PML was led by Prime Minister Liaquat Ali Khan, who wanted to adopt what was called Islamic socialism. Another leftist group was the Socialist Party. The Pakistan Socialist Party was politically isolated with little mass. This was despite its strong appeal in rural areas. It had around 1200 members and was a member of the Asian Socialist Conference. The Socialist Party's liberal programs were met with harsh opposition which the conservatives labeled as Kafirs. Dismayed with the results of the war, Prime Minister Liaquat Ali Khan survived a coup conspiracy hatched by the left-wing personalitie, including the armed forces personnel. In response to the activist left-wing sphere, Prime Minister Ali Khan succeeded in authoring and drafting the Objectives Resolution, in 1950. The house passed it on 12 March 1949, but met with harsh critic even from his Law Minister Jogendra Nath Mandal who argued against it.

In contrast, the Communist Party was more active, populist, and had support from the rural class due to its tough position taken on economic and social issues. The Communist Party quickly grasped its popularity as it espoused the causes of Pakistan's farmers and labourers against the nexus of zamindars, princely class, and landed gentry. During the 1954 general elections, the Communist Party swiftly gained the exclusive mandate in East Pakistan and representation in West Pakistan; earlier in 1950, the Communist Party played a major role in labour strikes for the support of the language movement. The Communist Party, with support from the Awami League, formed a democratic government in East Pakistan. The class struggle reached its limit when members of PML and the Communist Party scuffled violently with East-Pakistani police in 1958. The government responded by dismissing the government of the Communist Party in East Pakistan and arresting ~1,000 members of the Communist Party in West Pakistan, eventually banning the Communist Party there as well.

Uncomfortable with the workings of the democratic system, unruliness in the East Pakistan parliamentary elections, and the threat of Baloch separatism in West-Pakistan, Bengali President Iskandar Ali Mirza issued a proclamation that abolished all political parties in both West and East Pakistan, abrogated the two-year-old constitution, and imposed the first martial law in the country on 7 October 1958. The Communist leader, Hassan Nasir, was repeatedly arrested by the police; he died in prison in November 1960.

=== 1960s–70s: nation building ===
==== Power struggle and corporate industrialization ====
After martial law in 1958, President Ayub Khan abandoned the parliamentary form in favour of presidential system– a system called "Basic Democracy." The presidential regime of Ayub Khan is regarded as "Great Decade", in which his presidential programs moved the country from an agrarian economy towards rapid industrialization in the 1960s. The left in Pakistan faced further complications after the Sino-Soviet split in the 1960s, and the Communist Party had its own factions; one being Pro-Beijing and other being Pro-Moscow.

Despite the positive impact of industrialization, the trade unions, working class, peasants, and farmers were socially and economically subdued by the powerful industrial oligarch society who had strong ties with President Ayub Khan. In fact, industrial groups completely neglected the work conditions and failed to provide a healthy environment to the workers in the industries. According to the Chief Economist of the Planning Commission, Dr. Mahbub-ul-Haq, by 1968 "22 industrial family groups had come to dominate the economic and financial life-cycle of Pakistan and that they controlled about two-thirds of industrial assets, 80% of banking and 79% of insurance assets in the industrial domain." Further, President Khan's peaceful compromise with India in 1965 to end the Indo-Pakistani War created large scale disapproval from civil society. The treaty also sparked the resignation of Foreign minister Zulfikar Ali Bhutto, a staunch socialist and nationalist. In early months of 1968, Ayub Khan celebrated what he called a 'Decade of Development', sparking further agitations. That same November, a group of Rawalpindi students were heading back from Landi Kotal, when they were stopped at a Customs checkpoints near Attock, and badly roughed up by the police guards of the Customs officials. On returning to Rawalpindi, they staged a protest against the mishandling of police, which police attempted to quell through firing into the crowds, and killing a student. The resultant furore, which began as a student movement, was joined by working-class support, and transformed into the 1968 movement in Pakistan which brought socialism on agenda.

After a successful socialist conference in Lahore, Punjab, the Pakistan Peoples Party (PPP) was founded by the attending socialists, communists, and left-wing philosophers of the country. The PPP's manifesto called, titled "Islam is our Religion; Democracy is our Politics; Socialism is our Economy; Power Lies with the People", was written by Bengali communist J. A. Rahim, and first issued on 9 December 1967. The manifesto identified the party's ultimate goal, main objective and raison d'etre as being the achievement of an egalitarian and "classless society", which was believed to be attainable only through socialism. It called for "true equality of citizen's fraternity under the rule of democracy", within "an order of social and economic justice. Unlike the Socialist Party, the Peoples Party quickly gained popularity all over the country with its slogan, "Land to the Landless", as the party promised not only to abolish the foundational feudalism that had plagued the country, but also to redistribute lands amongst the landless and the peasants. The working class and labour movement quickly flocked to the party, believing it to be a party dedicated to the destruction of capitalism in the country.

Eventually, the socialist-oriented catchphrase "Roti, Kapra aur Makan" (lit. "bread, clothes, and housing"), inspired by Communist leader, V.I Lenin's popular slogan ‘Peace, Land and Bread’ became a nationwide rallying-call for the party. By the 1970s, the Pakistan Peoples Party had become the largest and most influential leading socialist and democratic entity in the country. The party published its ideas in its newspapers, such as "Nusrat", "Fatah", and "Mussawat".

=== 1970s–80s: reconstruction and restoration ===
==== Ethical and left nationalism ====
The 1968 Movement led to the end of Ayub Khan's term, but the suspension of democracy and military control continued under the new President Yahya Khan. However, General Khan allowed for the 1970 general elections to take place, which brought the Pakistan People's Party and the Awami League, in direct competition with each other. The election gave the Awami League an absolute majority entirely based in East Pakistan, while the PPP, led by Zulfikar Ali Bhutto, won largely in Punjab and Sindh. However, General Yahya Khan, along with Zulfikar Ali Bhutto, the leader of the PPP, were against a party from East Pakistan leading the federal government. Thus, General Khan did not seat the Parliament, leading to widespread unrest in East Pakistan, and subsequent military action in East Pakistan led to a bitter war with India, concluding in the separation of East Pakistan in 1971, and the creation of Bangladesh.

After the war, General Yahya Khan was forced to resign, and Zulfikar Ali Bhutto became President in 1972. The PPP in power espoused a politics of left-wing nationalism, calling for national unity and economic prosperity as a means of recovering from the socially and economically catastrophic losses of the 1971 war. Immediately, a nationalization process was initiated by the Peoples Party following a 1972 labour unrest. The PPP's left-wing policies attacked the feudal system; massive land reforms took place, limiting the amount of land that could be owned, with remaining land divisions being allotted to a large number of poor peasants, farmers, and landless tenants. Labour rights were upgraded more than ever before; poverty experienced a sharp reduction.

Fundamental rights of the citizen, such as access to adequate health and free education, were brought under a renewed focus. Schools, colleges, and universities were nationalized. A large segment of the banking sector, industrial sector (including iron and steel mills), engineering firms, vehicle, food and chemical production industries were also nationalized. The number and strength of trade unions experienced a rise. Rural residents, urban wage earners and landless peasants were to be given ‘material support’ as people of the state. In responding to strong defence program, the PPP launched the clandestine atomic bomb project, promoting literary activism, industrial developments and scientific awareness in all over the country.

==== Left-wings split off and decline ====
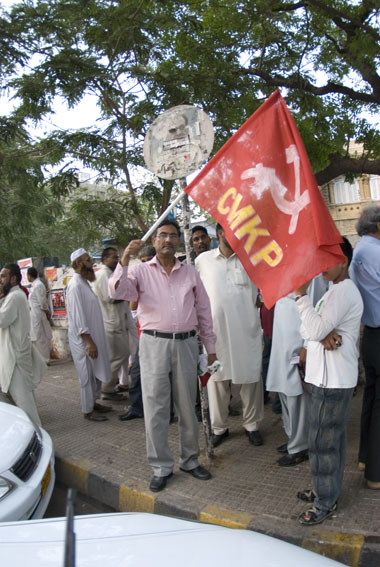
An activist from the Communist Mazdoor Kissan Party (CMKP) at a rally in Karachi, 2008

Despite PPP's populism and support, internal strife in the party would cause a schism and split the left-wing sphere. Though, the PPP had won the support from people on the issues of social justice, its economic policies, particularly that of its ad hoc attempts at nationalization, stagflated the country's economy. A number of critics, notably the conservatives and hard-line religious leaders, have however blamed Bhutto's socialist policies for slowing down Pakistan's economic progress, owing to poor productivity and high costs.

The left-wing party, ANP, was in a direct competition with the PPP despite similar ideologies. The debate over aligning with Afghanistan's communist party caused a major rift and problems with Afghanistan escalated over the Durand line. The Communist Party was also opposing the PPP over its economic programs and its influence limited to Karachi. This eventually led to left-wing parties joining the PNA alliance led by the country's right-wing conservative parties and competing against PPP in general elections in 1977.

The 1977 general elections resulted in first parliamentary victory of Peoples Party. Opposition parties claimed that the election was heavily rigged by the PPP. Tensions mounted and despite an agreement reached between the opposition and PPP, martial law was imposed in the country by Chief of Army Staff General Zia-ul-Haq in 1977. In April 1979, Bhutto was hanged in 1977 after a controversial trial, in which he was found guilty of murdering a political opponent. In 1982, his daughter Benazir Bhutto was elected as Peoples Party's chairwomanship. The Peoples Party struggled hard against General Zia-ul-Haq, who was supported by the United States.

The left-wing parties and socialism in the country met with harsh political opposition from the conservative Pakistan Muslim League and the hard-line religious bloc Clergy Coalition. The Soviet Union's intervention in Afghanistan led to a decline in the popular support of socialism in the country. The ultra-conservative President Zia-ul-Haq dealt with socialists and communists mass with harsh political oppression.

=== 1980s–present: re-emergence from outside Pakistan ===
==== The Struggle ====
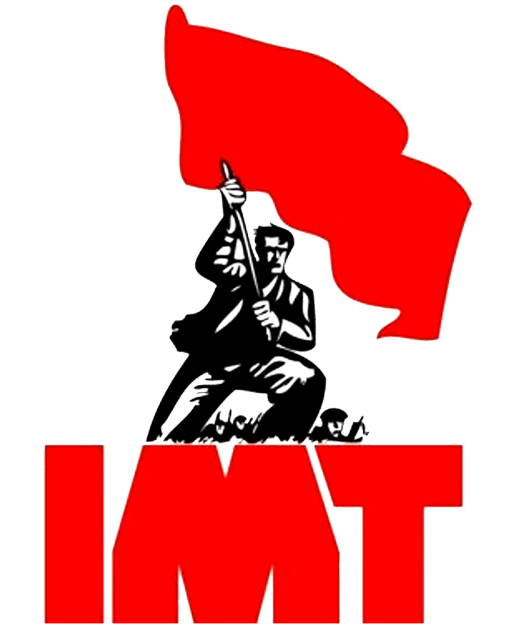
International Marxist Tendency emblem

The seeds of a renewed Marxist politics was planted in 1980 in Netherlands, when a number of leftist Pakistani activists who had fled Pakistan to escape Zia's repression found themselves in Amsterdam in the cold November 1980. The country was ruled by General Zia. These leftist Pakistani activists were Farooq Tariq, Tanvir Gondal (now better known as Lal Khan), Muhammed Amjad and Ayub Gorya.

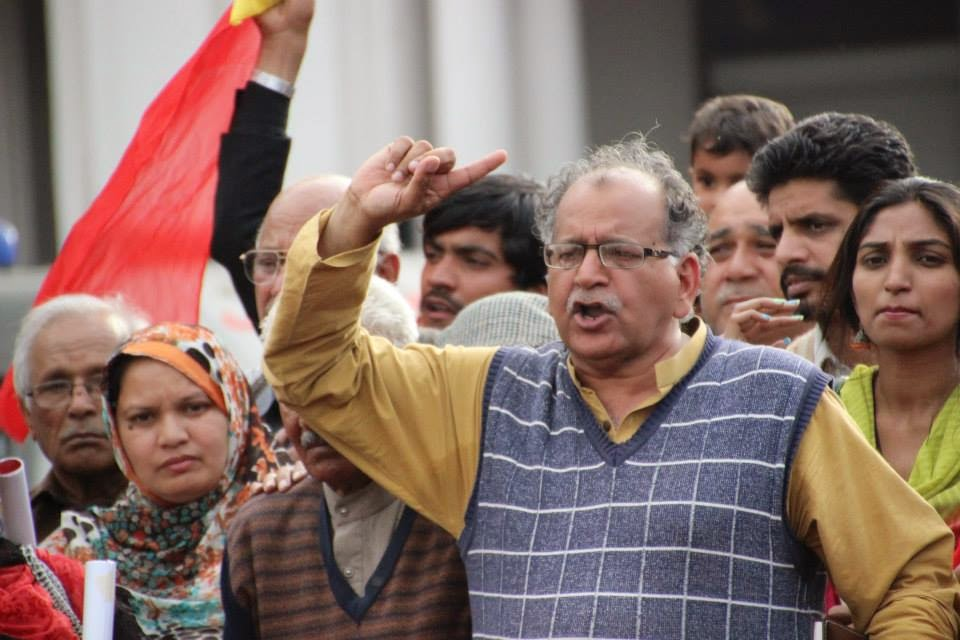
Farooq Tariq

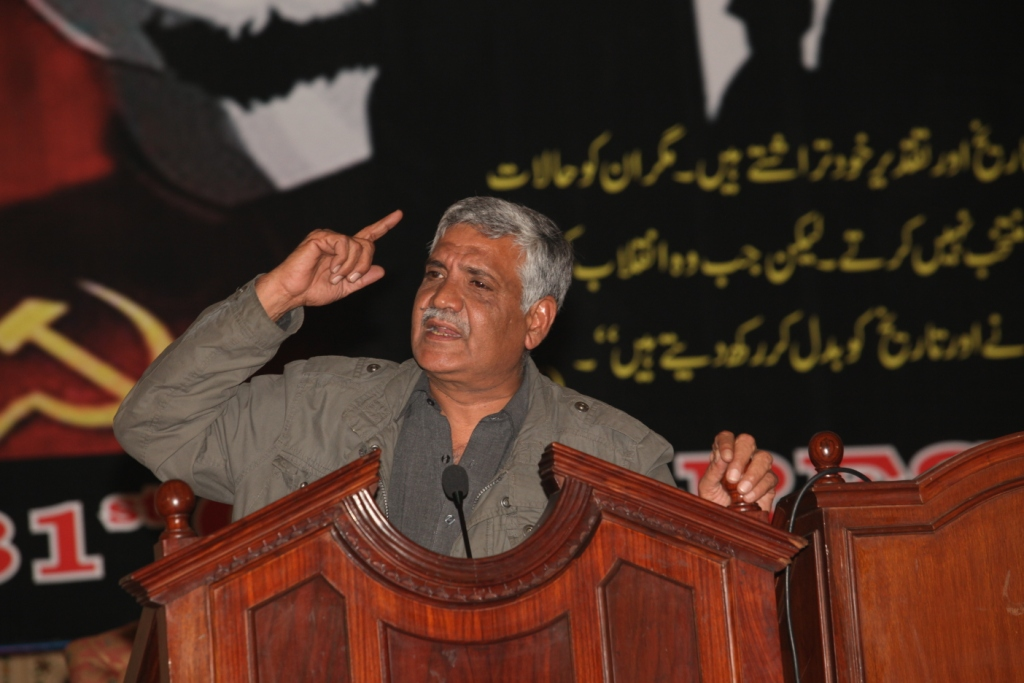
Lal Khan addressing The Struggle's annual Congress in Lahore in 2008

In November 1980, the Struggle group decided to start a monthly Urdu magazine called Jidd-o-jehed جدوجہد or The Struggle. The Struggle magazine soon developed a cult status among the Pakistani diaspora, and poets like Habib Jalib, Ahmad Faraz and Faiz Ahmed Faiz started contributing to the magazine by writing revolutionary and anti-dictatorship Urdu for the magazine. In December 1984, the magazine published a poem "Main Baaghi Hoon" میں باغی ہوں, written by Khalid Javaid Jan. The poem became a staple in popular culture due to its revolutionary tone and was used in underground protests as a weapon against Dictator Zia.

The Struggle group continued their activism in exile against military dictatorship in Pakistan and went on to organise a mass funeral for Zulfikar Ali Bhutto in front of the Pakistani embassy in Holland with nearly 500 participants. The charged environment also saw participants throw stones at the embassy's windows and Farooq was briefly arrested by Dutch police. Arrests, activism and attempts by Pakistani authorities to get them arrested made them popular with leftist and progressive movements in Europe. They campaigned on worker issues, against racism, immigrant issues and anti-nuclearisation with local left parties.

The group was also in contact with the Committee for a Workers' International (CWI), a Trotskyist international. In 1986, the Struggle group started working from Pakistani soil when Farooq Tariq and Lal Khan returned to Pakistan. The Struggle followed a strategy known as Entryism, a theory that small militant groups should join mainstream workers' parties in order to pull them to the left. The strategy is employed in an attempt to expand influence and was advocated by Trotsky. The Struggle at this stage was the official section of CWI in Pakistan and thus worked within PPP.

In the early 1990s, the Committee for a Workers' International (CWI) split in two over the question of Entryism. Peter Taaffe, a prominent member of English section of the CWI advocated an "Open Turn", implying the building of an independent organization and an end to "Entryism". Whereas, another faction led by Ted Grant wanted to maintain its "entrist" strategy. The Struggle also suffered the split and Farooq Tariq, along with perhaps one dozen Struggle members, followed Peter Taaffe's lead and went on to build an independent political party for workers in Pakistan. The other faction, led by Lal Khan, continued with its "entryism" inside the Pakistan People's Party (PPP). They promoted the idea that PPP is a party that has a mass following among the workers and peasants, although its leading layer is composed mainly of bourgeois and feudal elements. The Struggle argues that in Pakistan, as in all other countries, the aim of their Marxist tendency is to win over the workers and peasants.

In November 2012, Farooq Tariq's Labour Party Pakistan, the Awami Party, and Workers Party merged to form the Awami Workers Party (AWP) in an unprecedented effort to build a genuine Left alternative to mainstream political forces in Pakistan. The AWP promotes Left unity and includes members from all Communist tendencies: Trotskyism, Marxist-Leninism, and Maoism.

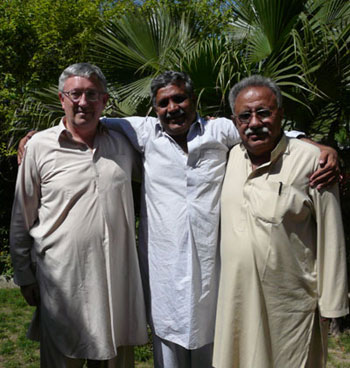
Alan Woods, Lal Khan and Jam Saqi in annual IMT congress held in Lahore in 2008

The Struggle طبقاتی جدوجہد continued their struggle for a Socialist revolution in Pakistan as an official section of the Marxist "International" led by Ted Grant. Grant had formed Committee for a Marxist International in various countries, particularly Spain, after splitting with CWI in 1992. At the world congress of Committee for a Marxist International in 2006, the organization was renamed International Marxist Tendency (IMT). Lal Khan continues to be the editor of the Struggle magazine and leader of the Struggle طبقاتی جدوجہد group. He also writes articles regularly for the Daily Times. and Dunya The Struggle group has their own publication agency and has published numerous books and leaflets on topics including Marxist ideology, history of Marxist struggle in Pakistan, and various books covering history of Bolshevik revolution. Some of the books are: Partition – Can it be undone?, Pakistan's Other Story – The Revolution of 1968–69, and Kashmir: A Revolutionary Way Out. Books in Urdu language include چین کدھر, مذہبی بنیاد پرستی اور انقلابی مارکسزم, whereas translated publications from other language into Urdu include ریاست اور انقلاب از لینن، عورت اور خاندان از ٹراٹسکی، کمیونسٹ مینی فیسٹو از مارکس و اینگلز. The Struggle's trade union front is known as Pakistan Trade Union Defence Campaign (PTUDC), and multiple other fronts working among Youth, including Unemployed Youth Movement. In 2015, youth and students fronts of the Struggle started a campaign to bring together prominent left-wing students and youth organizations from across the country on a single platform. In December 2015, Progressive Youth Alliance (PYA) was launched in Lahore.

==== Split within The Struggle ====
In the first quarter of 2016, The Struggle suffered a split, with the majority leaving the IMT retaining their name as The Struggle, while the minority reorganized as Lal Salam لال سلام. Lal Salam is the official Pakistani section of the IMT.

==== Awami Workers Party ====
Following the split of Committee for a Workers' International (CWI), a Trotskyist international, The Struggle, also suffered a split and Farooq Tariq, along with perhaps one dozen Struggle members, and went on to build an independent workers party in Pakistan. Farooq Tariq and his comrades announced the formation of Labour Party Pakistan in 1997.

In November 2012, Farooq Tariq's Labour Party Pakistan, the Awami Party, and Workers Party merged to form the Awami Workers Party (AWP) in an unprecedented effort to build a genuine Left alternative to mainstream political forces in Pakistan. The AWP promotes the Left unity and includes members from all Communist tendencies: Trotskyism, Marxist-Leninism, and Maoism.

=== 1980s–90s: moderation and competition ===
==== Consolidation and populism ====
A huge number of left-wing politicians and intellectuals were thrown in jail to face a trial, Jam Saqi Trial, in the 1980s. Under Zia regime, the socialism itself began to struggle to survive in the country in an intense anti-Soviet atmosphere. In responding the Zia's oppression, the left-wing parties united in a massive platform known as, Movement for the Restoration of Democracy (MRD) which was led by the PPP. The ANP had found support from the Soviet Union as early as in 1983. During the period of 1977-91, the Communist Party of the Soviet Union (CPSU) started its covert political activities through the Awami National Party, many of its senior leadership served Soviets intermediary and advisers. President Zia's interior secretary, Roedad Khan, later wrote that the MRD regime was able to manipulate this perception to their advantage and prevent the MRD from gaining greater appeal on a nationwide level.

Despite its consolidation, the MRD suffered many set backs because of its Pro-Leninist stance which was not the "line" of Kremlin at that time.

The events that led the collapse of the Soviet Union shattered Pakistan's left. It almost disappeared, until Benazir Bhutto succeeded to unite the scattered leftists mass, which integrated into the PPP, and turned the radical and pro-Soviet leftists into more Social democracy with the principles of democratic socialism.

==== The New Left and social democracy ====
The MRD alliance could not sustained itself in late 1988 and quickly collapse after the death of President Zia-ul-Haq in 1988 which marked its way for peaceful general elections, outlined the return of Pakistan Peoples Party in national power.

Furthermore, the events led to a dissolution of USSR in 1991 shattered the left in Pakistan. The break-up of the USSR in 1991 also generated hopelessness and desperation in among the communist parties. The left-wing parties almost disappeared until Benazir Bhutto came to its protection. In opposition against the conservatives, Benazir Bhutto succeeded to unite the scattered leftist groups, which integrated into the PPP, and turned the radical and pro-Soviet leftists towards social democracy with the principles of democratic socialism.

In the 1990s, the left-wing groups, now united under PPP, found their self in a fierce competition with Pakistan Muslim League (PML(N)), a centre-right conservative party led by Nawaz Sharif. The PPP and left was in period of counter-revolutionary consciousness in Pakistan, giving birth to the rise of fundamentalism. The political competition with the conservatives, aligning with the PML(N), gave a new life to the left-wing parties to gather around their movement in support for the PPP in 1992. The controversial privatization of the Pakistan Muslim League (N) government in 1992 had collapsed the support for the conservatives.

As a result of general elections held in 1993, the PPP and the Left came to power again, but only to re-engage in competition with the Pakistan Muslim League (N). The power struggle between left and right wing parties damages the economy but, on the other hand, consolidated its position in the country. The left-wing sphere almost split in the 1990s after a paramilitary operation took place in Karachi to remove another leftist party, MQM; the operation was halted in 1995. The PPP and the leftists put forwarded a program of vintage industrial nationalization, computer literacy, strong emphasis on the scientific education, awareness women suffrage and rights, and promotion of the principles of social democracy and left-wing nationalism. In response, the Pakistan Muslim League and conservatives introduced privatization, with liberalization, right-wing nationalism, and a strong emphasis on religion and scientific education. By the end of 1996, the controversial death of populist left-wing leader, Murtaza Bhutto, turned out to be a final event that led the dismissal of the left-oriented government of PPP by its own leftist president Farooq Leghari (he was soon ousted from the presidency by the conservatives of PML(N) in 1997).

In 1997, the Left, sitting in parliamentary opposition, further gained power in effectively paralysed the right-wing parties attempts to pass the more conservative bills to be part of the Constitution. The left successfully pressured the PML(N) to move with a proposal of conducting the country's first nuclear tests in response to India's nuclear tests in 1998. Disturbance in civil-military relations in 1999 led to the dismissal of centre-right conservative, PML government. The popular support for the PML(N) and PPP declined, with the fall of socialism and conservatism at once in 2000. President Pervez Musharraf called for a Third Way which led to an establishment of centrist PML(Q) in 2002 whereas the pro-social democratic and centre-left party, the PTI, also emerged in the arena led by famed sportsman Imran Khan.

=== 2000s–2010s: Contemporary history ===
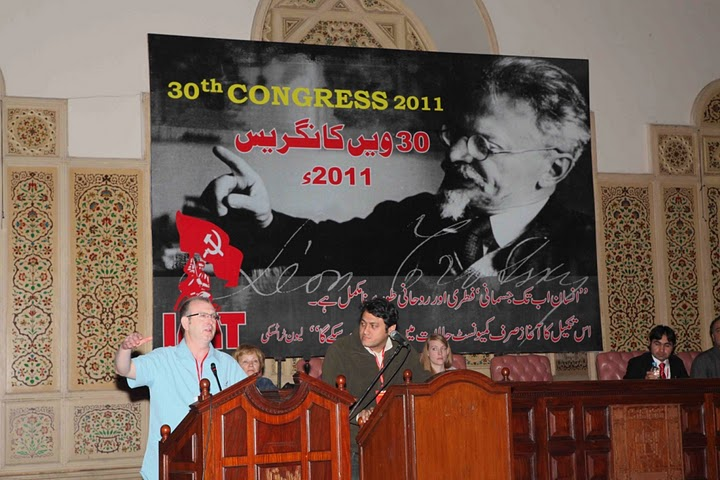
The IMT conference in Lahore, 2011

If they default, and they can’t get oil, companies go bust, and people don’t have jobs, you would say this is a country ripe for a Bolshevik revolution

— Cameron Munter, United States Ambassador to Pakistan

==== Re-defining position of the New Left ====
As an aftermath of 9/11 attacks in the United States and the followup of US invasion of Afghanistan in 2001, the general elections in 2002 saw liberals coming to national power for the first time in the history of the country. Despite Musharraf's attempts to provide better civil administration, the support for President Musharraf lessened and the idea of Third Way, with the Enlightened Moderation, began to see resistance from the conservative and leftist parties.

In 2002, the Pakistan Social Democratic Party was founded but was short lived. After a few months, the party was disbanded in favour of PPP. In 2003, the PPP staged a large opposition rally against the Iraq war and the United States. In 2004, the Left projected its power in Peshawar after the Communist Party staged a massive demonstration against Pervez Musharraf and the United States. The PPP effectively paralysed Pervez Musharraf over the issue of LFO and the Left subsequently maligned Musharraf's image over the nuclear proliferation issue in the country. Historians of leftist activism noted the fact that the atomic proliferation debriefings had enraged and outraged the leftists and conservatives alike of their "national hero", Dr. Qadeer Khan. After this scandal in 2005–07, the U.S. opposition from the leftist-liberal parties was extremely fierce much more than the conservative parties, effectively sabotaging any U.S. efforts for their economic involvement and maligning the image in the country which contributed in the sharp and recorded rise of the anti-American emotions in the hearts of the Pakistanis.

The Left in Pakistan lost its steering after the assassination of Benazir Bhutto in 2007, and the armed right-wing insurgency in the country further limited the Left. The populist Lawyer's movement, was also influenced by the leftist ideas and prominent leftist leaders, such as Aitzaz Ahsan, Ali Ahmad Kurd, and Raza Rabbani, were the front personalities to lead the movement to restore the Judiciary and to ouster Pervez Musharraf from the government. In spite of right-wing pressure and accusations of corruption, the Left demonstrated its united stand during the general elections held in 2013 under new left-wing leaders Raza Rabbani and Aitzaz Ahsan

Though a number of steps were taken in this regard by the government led by Asif Ali Zardari which included but are not limited to, Employees Stock option scheme under which public sector employees were made share holders in their respective departments, free of cost housing scheme was initiated in Sindh under the name of Benazir Bhen Basti, more than 56,000 acres of land was distributed within the peasants, a comprehensive plan for the eradication of poverty was started under the name of Benazir Income Support Program which is now one of the largest social safety program in Asia. In addition to that a program named as waseela-e-haq was initiated under which 0.3 million rps. each were distributed in between thousands of deserving families so that they can start their own earning. Schemes such as Benazir life insurance scheme was also initiated. Thousands of contractual employees were not only regularized but thousand of other employees were also reinstated. As a result of these steps then President of Pakistan Mr. Asif Ali Zardari was elected as the Vice-President of the Socialist International.

In 2018, Pakistan Tehreek-e-Insaf came into power with Imran Khan as the 22nd Prime Minister. He promised to make Pakistan a welfare state, in accordance with nationalist principles. Some policies of PTI government are in line with Social Democracy, Pakistani nationalism and Populism. His policies included: Rule of law, rights for all Pakistanis (esp. for the lower classes), irrespective of caste, colour, religion etc., women empowerment, and a system of merit.

Barabri Party Pakistan has formed and emerged as the mainstream Left-Wing political Party in 2017. Pakistan's famous pop-singer and left-wing political activist Jawad Ahmad formed this party along with other left-wing political workers. in general elections 2018, Jawad Ahmad run against Imran Khan, Bilalwal Bhutto Zardari and Nawaz Sharif. In a very short period of time Barabri Party Pakistan became very famous across the county as opposition of all ruling elite parties. In 2024, Barabri Party Pakistan fielded 31 candidates in General Elections, and became the largest party of Left in Pakistan.

==== Influence in popular culture, literary, arts and science ====
The left orientation has greatly influenced the literature, scientific activities, arts, and popular culture. The literary work of Faiz Ahmad Faiz, Anwar Maqsood, Habib Jalib, Aitzaz Ahsan, and Tina Sani, has been instrumental in projecting left-wing ideas in the country. The Laal (lit. Red) gained much appraisal and popularity for singing socialist political song, which played a crucial role in mobilizing the people in support to the reinstatement of the Chief Justice Iftikhar Chaudhry in 2007.

In 2012, the scientific work of theorist, Munir Ahmad Khan, was publicly recognized by the Government after posthumously awarding Munir Khan the Nishan-e-Imtiaz for his contribution to science as a gesture of political rehabilitation. The literary work of Tariq Ali has been adopted in playwrights and theatre and films. His playwright, The Leopard and The Fox, was premiered in New York in October 2007 and later on Karachi Arts Council in 2010.

== Parties and groups ==
- Communist Party of Pakistan (1948–present)
- Pakistan People's Party (1967–present)
- Mazdoor Kisan Party (1968–present)
- Awami Tahreek (1970–present)
- The Struggle Pakistan (1980–present)
- Awami National Party (1986–present)
- Pakistan Awami Tehreek (1989–present)
- Pashtunkhwa Milli Awami Party (1989–present)
- Balochistan National Party (Mengal) (1996–present)
- Pakistan Peoples Party (Shaheed Bhutto) (1997–present)
- Communist Party of Pakistan (Thaheem) (2002–present)
- Pakistan Social Democratic Party (2002–present)
- Hazara Democratic Party (2003–present)
- National Party (2003–present)
- Socialist Movement Pakistan (2004–present)
- Baloch Republican Party (2008–present)
- Qaumi Watan Party (2012–present)
- Awami Workers Party (2012–present)
- National Youth Organisation (2013–present)
- Pakistan Peoples Party Workers (2014–present)
- Barabri Party Pakistan (2017–present)
- Left Democratic Front (2017–present)
- Haqooq-e-Khalq Party (2022–present)

=== Former ===
- Pakistan National Congress (1885–1975)
- Pakistan Socialist Party (1948–1958)
- Ganatantri Dal (1953–1957)
- Labour Party Pakistan (1986–2012)
- Sindh National Front (1989–2017)
- Communist Mazdoor Kissan Party (1995–2015)
- National Workers Party (1999–2010)
- Awami Jamhuri Ittehad Pakistan (2012–2015)
- Workers Party Pakistan (2010–2012)

== See also ==
- Conservatism in Pakistan
- Feudalism in Pakistan
- Secularism in Pakistan
- Democracy in Pakistan
- Islamisation in Pakistan
