= Left Democratic Front (Pakistan) =

Pakistani ten-party political alliance

Left Democratic Front لیفٹ ڈیموکریٹک فرنٹ
- Abbreviation: LDF
- President: Akhtar Hussain
- Secretary-General: Taimur Rahman
- Founded: 29 December 2017
- Headquarters: Islamabad
- Ideology: Communism
- Political position: Left-wing to far-left
- Colors: Red

Party flag

Left Democratic Front (Urdu: لیفٹ ڈیموکریٹک فرنٹ) is a political front comprising 10 left parties in Pakistan. The alliance was formed at a meeting of the 10 parties in Lahore on 29 December 2017. It has a common program that promotes class struggle, people’s democracy, secularism, socialism, and peace with neighboring countries.

== Constituents ==
Party	Ideology
Communist Party of Pakistan	Communism; Marxism–Leninism
Mazdoor Kisan Party	Communism; Marxism–Leninism
Awami Workers Party	Democratic socialism Progressivism
Pakistan Mazdoor Mahaz	Hoxhaism
Baloch National Movement	Baloch nationalism
Pakistan Trade Union Defence Campaign	Trade unionism Labourism
Awami Jamhoori Party	
Jeay Sindh Mahaz (Khalid Junejo)	Sindhi nationalism
JK Peoples' National Party	
JK Awami Workers Party	

== See also ==
- Communist Party of Pakistan (Thaheem)
- Haqooq-e-Khalq Party
- Left Democratic Alliance (Bangladesh)
- The Struggle Pakistan
