= Conservatism in Pakistan =

Pakistani political orientation

Conservatism in Pakistan (Urdu: پاکستان میں قدامت پسندی) generally relates to the traditional, social, and religious identities in the politics of Pakistan. American historian Stephen Cohen describes several political constants in Pakistan's conservatism: respect for tradition, the rule of law and the Islamic religion which is integral in the idea of Pakistan.

The conservative philosophy, principles, ideas, and traditions were first adopted by the Prime Minister Liaquat Ali Khan as part of his internal policies in 1950. The conservative tradition has played a major role in Pakistani politics, culture, and organized conservative movement has played a key role in politics only since the 1950s. According to the CIA database, approximately 95–97% of the Pakistani people are the followers of Islam while the remaining believe in Christianity, Hinduism, and others.

The conservatism movement in Pakistan has been normally associated with the Pakistan Muslim League (PML)– the successor party to the one which was responsible for the founding of Pakistan. Dominant and influential section of the PML is led by its extended PML(N), which is currently led by its leader and the former Prime Minister Nawaz Sharif, elected in general elections held in 2013. Nonetheless, the conservative vote bank of the country partitioned equally between the PML(N) and the centrist PTI of Imran Khan on the topics mainly concerning the foreign policy, national, and social issues. In 2018, the conservative votebank eventually switched to PTI when Imran Khan was sworn as Prime Minister who defeated PML's candidate Shahbaz Sharif in the nationwide general elections.

== Idea of Pakistan, conception, and conservatism ==
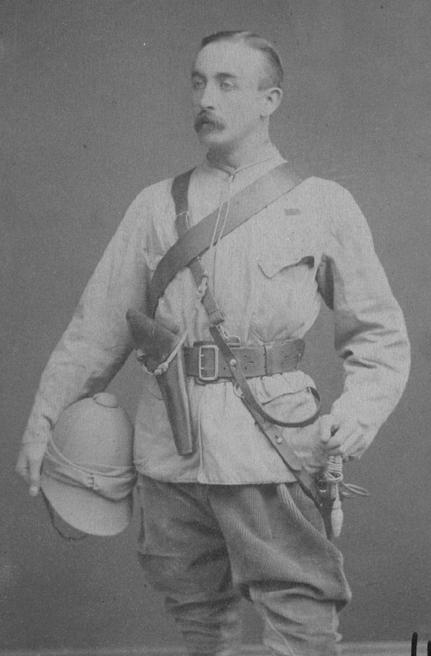
Lord Minto met with the Muslim delegation in June 1906. The Minto-Morley Reforms of 1909 called for separate Muslim electorates.

Since the 1930s, the Muslim League had been lobbying and pushing its politics for a separate homeland for the Muslims of India, known as Pakistan.

The constitution and principles of the Muslim League were contained in the Green Book, written by conservative thinker and cleric, Maulana Muhammad Ali. Its goals at this stage did not include establishing an independent Muslim state, but rather concentrated on protecting Muslim liberties and rights, promoting understanding between the Muslim community and other Indians, educating the Muslim and Indian community at large on the actions of the government, and discouraging violence. However, several factors over the next thirty years, including sectarian violence, led to a re-evaluation of the Muslim League's aims.

With Muhammad Ali Jinnah becoming the President of the Muslim League, the party gradually became the leading representative body of Indian Muslims. A fresh call for a separate state was then made by the famous writer, poet, and philosopher Allama Muhammad Iqbal, who in his presidential address to the 1930 convention of the Muslim League said that he felt that a separate Muslim state was essential in an otherwise Hindu-dominated South Asia. The name was coined by Cambridge student and Muslim nationalist Choudhary Rahmat Ali, and was published on 28 January 1933 in the pamphlet Now or Never. After a long political struggle and party meetings with the people of the North-West India, the British Empire granted the establishment of Pakistan and independence of India; both countries joined the British Commonwealth organization.

The Muslim League was not the only conservative movement in the erstwhile region of British India that became Pakistan. Others included the Congress Nationalist Party, the Punjab Unionist Party the Hindu Mahasabha and the Akali Dal.

In addition, a number of figures within the Indian National Congress, such as Sardar Vallabhai Patel were conservative.

After Jinnah died in 1948, Prime Minister Liaquat Ali Khan's constitutional policies were directed to work on constitution. On 12 March 1949, Prime Minister Ali Khan had the State parliament passing and promulgating the Objectives Resolution, which ultimately declared Islam as state religion of the country. The main objective of Resolution was the "declaration of State's submitting to the democratic faith of Islam and to the sovereignty of God". Such resolution was met with great resistance in the state parliament when Law minister J.N. Mandal resigned from his ministry and gave great criticism to Prime Minister Liaquat Ali Khan. Politicization of Islam in the country further tighten its support when ultra-conservative Clerics passed a "demand draft", called 22 Points which called for the preparation of constitution according to Objectives Resolution, in 1950.

In 1977, the government of Zulfiqar Ali Bhutto outlawed alcohol and drugs and changed the weekend from Sunday to Friday, but no substantive Islamic reform program was implemented prior to General Zia-ul-Haq's Islamization program. Starting in February 1979, new penal measures based on Islamic principles of justice went into effect. These carried considerably greater implications for women than for men. A welfare and taxation system based on Zakat and a profit-and-loss banking system were also established in accordance with Islamic prohibitions against usury but were inadequate.

=== Early foundation of conservatism ===
==== 1947–59: Independence and power struggle ====
After the death of Jinnah, Prime Minister Liaquat Ali Khan successfully authored and passed the Objectives Resolution from the state parliament, roughly declaring Islam as state religion. The idea of Conservatism in Pakistan identifies several constants including the "respect for tradition, the rule of law and the Islamic religion." Proponents of right-wing conservatism and nationalist agenda was supported by Prime Minister Ali Khan as part of his internal policies. His conservative policies were met with resistance from the left-wing which was accused of hatching the conspiracy against Ali Khan. In 1979, the religious conservatism and the state-sponsored Islamization became a primary policy of military government of President General Zia-ul-Haq.

As an aftermath of 1954 general elections, conservatism lost its edge in East-Pakistan when communism deeply asserted itself following the victory of Communist Party. The military dictatorships of Ayub Khan and Yahya Khan further limited the conservative platform. During the 1970 general elections, the religious conservative and right-wing conservative parties participated in the election with a direct competition with left-oriented PPP. The Islamic conservative parties successfully pressed PPP's Bhutto to declare Ahmadiyya sect as Non-Muslim domination. The right-wing mass made its notable comeback in a response to nationalization program of Bhutto, and called for right-wing alliance, PNA, against PPP.

=== National building ===
==== 1960–78: Religious right and nationalism ====
In the 1960s, the conservative movements in the country had emphasized Islamic roots and values in the society but ultimately it did not have any lasting effects in an opposition to President Ayub Khan aggressive policies to put the agrarian country into the roads of industrialization.

In 1965, the conservative movements prudently went out to gather their support for Fatima Jinnah, sister of Muhammad Ali Jinnah, had initially campaigned on Islamic tradition and promotion of nationalistic society. During the 1965 presidential election, President Ayub Khan used the hard-line Islamic conservative groups to get Fatima Jinnah disqualified from the elections; nonetheless, this scheme failed when the huge public voted for Fatima Jinnah's bid for presidency. It is noted by historians that without the usage of state machinery, President Ayub Khan had almost lost the elections.

The religious right was dismayed when President Ayub Khan abrogated his deal with the orthodoxy religious parties, the JeI, in 1966. Its right-wing populism was one of many factor that made the party popular, though it was short-lived. In 1967, the leftist ideas dominated by PPP gained much support from the public. The conservative parties produced a performed poor electoral performance during the general elections held in 1970. Only Pakistan Muslim League (PML) led by Nurul Amin had gained considerable votes from all over the country; the JeI faced with an embarrassing election result winning only four out of 300 seats.

After a bitter war with India and the loss of East Pakistan, the conservative movements were seen as the last blow to their vision at that time. The left-oriented PPP initiated a nationalization process to hamper the private-ownership of the industries in the country. In 1973, a violent disturbances instigated by JeI forced the PPP to pass the Second Amendment law to declare Ahmadiyya domination as Non-Muslim. Much of the Constitution was philosophically leaning towards conservative roots and foundations. The JeI lost all of its support during this time, and a new conservative party, Pakistan Muslim League had found its own support provided by influential capitalist thinkers, investors, and wealthy donors who resisted the nationalization program. Although, the JeI was the major contributory of right-wing Pakistan National Alliance (PNA), it was the Pakistan Muslim League who was the most resource party of all. Despite populism and mass financial capital spent in favor of Pakistan National Alliance (PNA), the alliance performed poorly during the general elections held in 1977. A massive civil disobedience acts, right-wing violence and calls for martial law led up to be dismissal of PPP's government in 1977 after a martial law took advance.

=== Activism and authoritarianism ===
==== 1979-1980s: Conservatism ascent ====
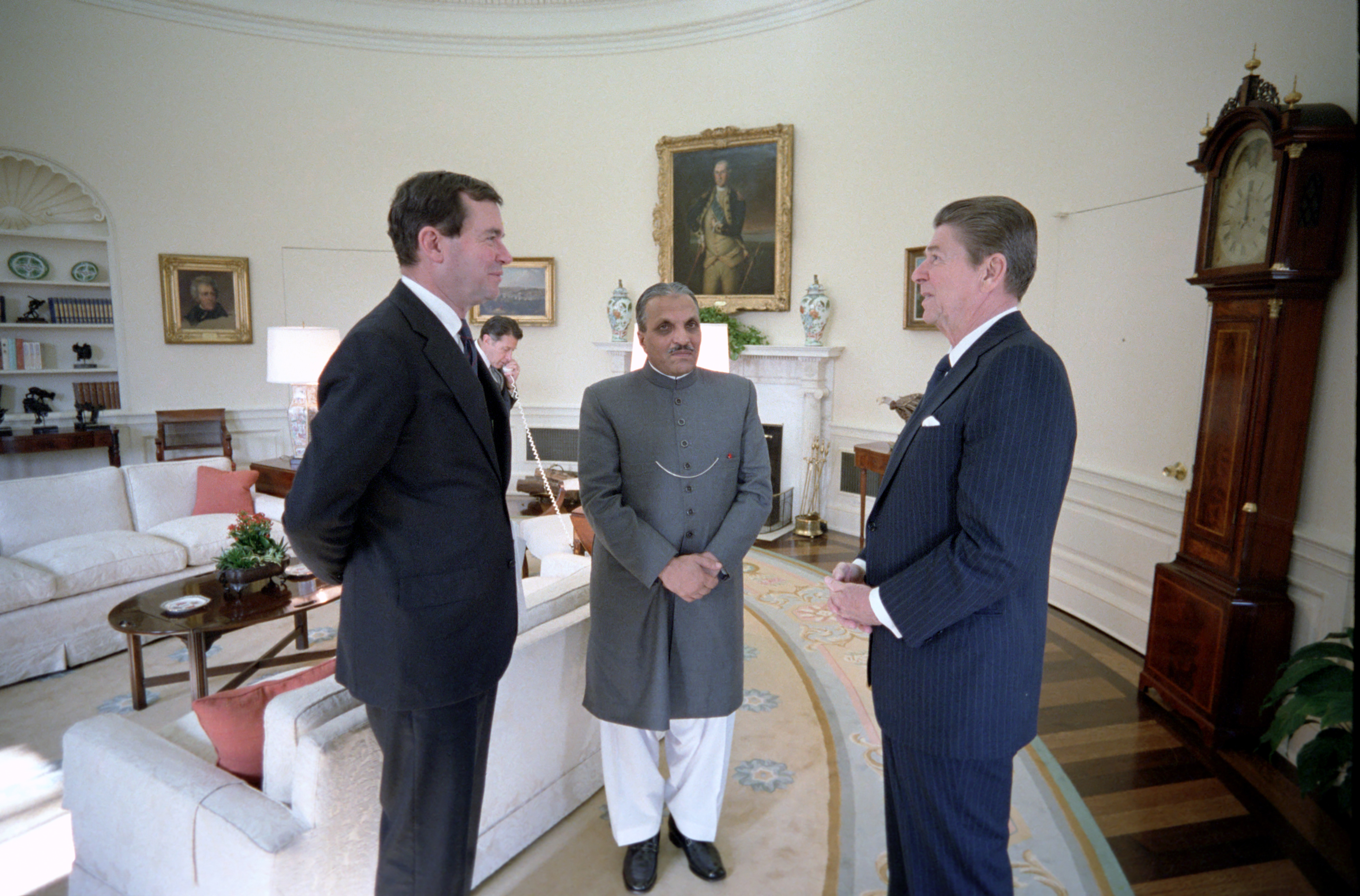
President Zia meeting with conservative US president, Ronald Reagan, and his NSA William Clark in 1982.

With the successful coup d'état against the left-wing government of Pakistan Peoples Party (PPP), the modern conservatism movement took over the control of state's affairs under President Zia-ul-Haq. The conservative principles dominated Zia's economic and foreign policies, including the interest-free system and strict opposition to Soviet Communism defining his military administration's political philosophy.

President Zia-ul-Haq largely depended on the Council of Islamic Ideology (CII) for work and political recommendation for policy guidance issue. On legal philosophical issues, the Federal Shariat Court was greatly espoused and extended its activities at federal level judiciary. President Zia is credited with the success of modern conservatism movement in the country, by his supporters; some galvanizing the Zia's directives prevented the wider Soviet incursions into the region as well as economic prosperity. President Zia's military administration brought a fury of conservative economists; conservative foreign policy practitioners; and social conservatives, who identified with his religious and social ideals. Zia was attacked by left-wing personalities at the time as being a "source of fundamentalism", but conservative historians asserted that he decisively limited Soviet Union to Afghanistan.

In defining the conservatism, President Zia once described to British journalist Ian Stephen that: "The basis of Pakistan was Islam. The basis of Pakistan were Muslims in South Asia are a separate culture. It was the Two-Nation Theory that lead to the independence of Pakistan." The university curriculum in the country was upgraded by President Zia-ul-Haq, that includes the teaching of Islamic Studies and Arabic languages courses, which were made compulsory for students to get their degrees in arts and social sciences. The Pakistan Studies were made compulsorily for engineering, medical education, commerce, law and nursing education. Extra educational certificates and diplomas were given to people who were Hafiz. On national priorities, the atomic bomb project was aggressively put forwarded by President Zia-ul-Haq to counter Indian threat on East and Soviet threat on West.

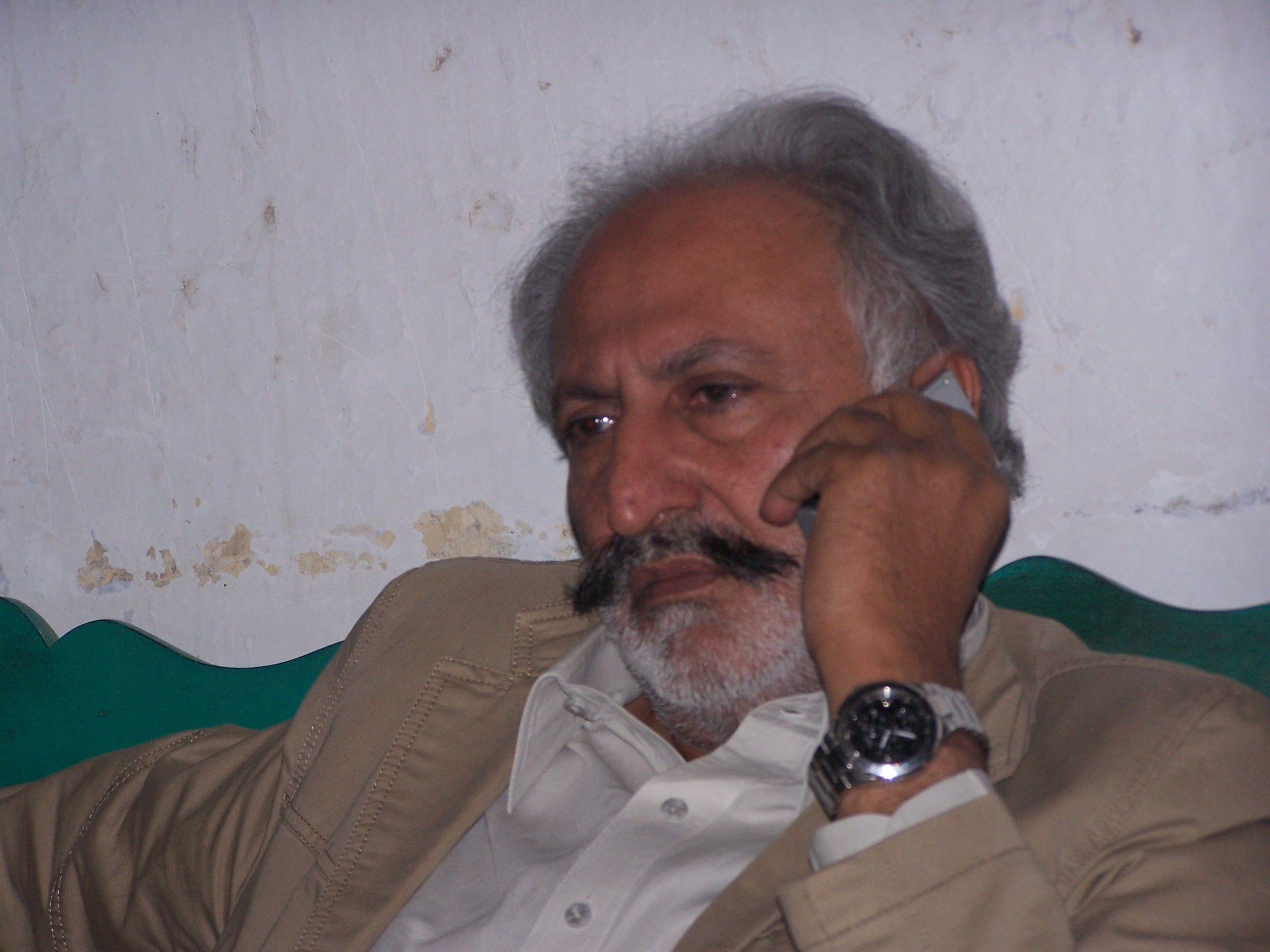
A conservative leader for PML(N) from Sindh, Zain Ansari

During his eleven years in office, President Zia's conservative reforms and economic policies pushed the country's national economic GDP percent rate reached to 5.88%, surpassing the economic record of President Ayub Khan in the 1960s. The GNP was rated at 6.8%; both rates, the GDP and the GNP, were highest in the world at that time. His policies had hard-hitting impact on Pakistan and some of his economic policies were continued by the successive governments. According to the historians, his policies were directed towards making Pakistan the citadel of Islam so that it could play an honorable and prominent role for the Islamic world. Leftist historians maintained that his legacy remains a most toxic, enduring, and tamper-proof legacy, but to point of view of conservative thinkers, Zia credited by some for preventing wider Soviet incursions into the region as well as economic prosperity.

Despite Zia's tough rhetoric and his authoritarianism, the country's society continued to move forward towards the enlightenment, and the sense of moderation. According to the critic of Zia and leftist cultural writer, Nadeem Paracha, further wrote that in 2013 that it was the "conservative regime of Zia when the Western 1980's fashion wear and hairstyle was popularized, and the rock music bands that were gaining momentum under his regime. Paracha further wrote that: "Ironically, it was these political and economic tensions and pretensions, heavy metal, rock music power plays and the economic prosperity that also propelled the gradual expansion of the country's urban middle and lower-middle-classes. According to the leftist cultural critic, Nadeem F. Paracha: "The youth culture at that emerged from these classes that launched the first shots of the kind of pop culture, scene and music we now call modern Pakistani pop and rock."

=== Moderation and Competition ===
==== 1990s–2000s: The New Right and conservative democracy ====
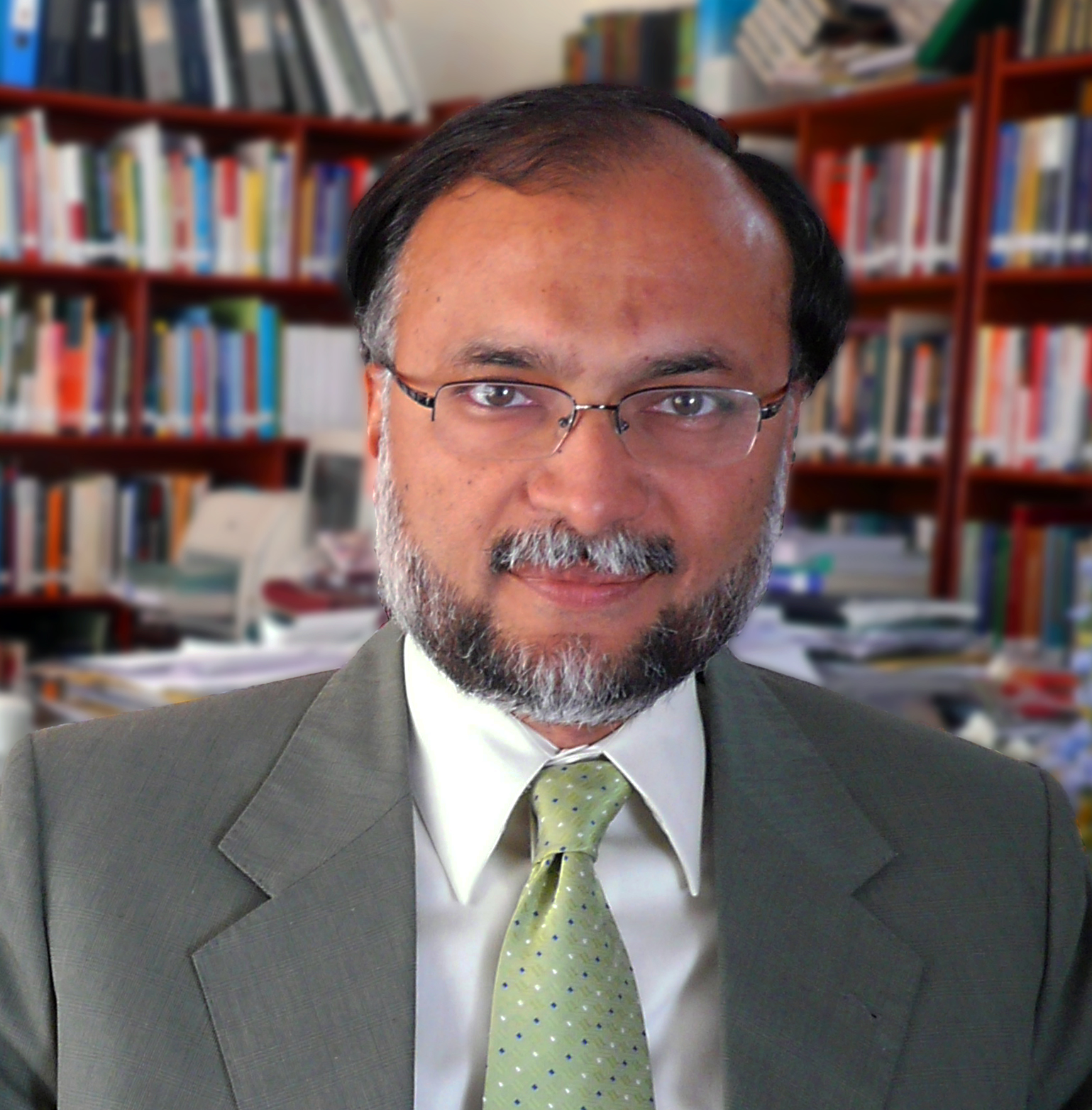
Conservative thinker, Ahsan Ekbal

After Zia's death in 1988, the left-oriented Pakistan Peoples Party (PPP) came in national power through general elections held in 1988. The 1990–2000s is a period of intense and fierce competition between leftist sphere led by Benazir Bhutto and conservative circle led by Nawaz Sharif. In less than two years, the PPP government was dismissed in by the usage of Eighth Amendment in mere two years. In 1990, the conservative mass led by Nawaz Sharif won the general elections; the elections were controversial with judicial inquiries revealing the role of intelligence community playing a vital role in support for Pakistan Muslim League (N) (PML(N)) during the 1990 general elections.

The Conservatives led by Prime Minister Nawaz Sharif came in national prominence for the first time in the history, under a democratic transition. Immediately, the PML(N) government launched privatization and reforms towards the economic liberalization in the country. Key proponents of Sharia was made part of Penal Code in 1993. Islamic values were emphasized as a part of the social conservative reforms by the PML(N) government which support at a mainstream level.

In 1997, the PML(N) came back to power with an exclusive mandate during the general election which saw PML(N) struck its overwhelming two-third majority in the parliament for the first time in the history of Pakistan. Despite the confrontation with leftist president Farooq Leghari and liberal Chief Justice, Sajjad Ali in 1997, PML(N) decisively consolidated its authoritative position by appointing the national conservative jurist, Saeeduzzaman Siddiqui, as Chief Justice, and religiously conservative, Rafiq Tarrar, as President in 1997.

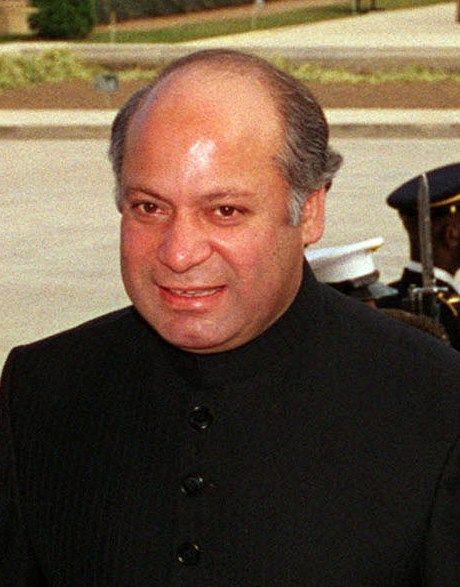
Prime Minister Nawaz Sharif in 1998

Upon resolving the authority issue, the PML(N) made notable constitutional reforms towards the constitutional conservatism when the PML(N) government oversaw the passages of thirteenth, fourteenth, fifteenth amendment in the national assembly, a lower house. However, the fifteenth amendment failed to passed from the Senate as Prime Minister Sharif never brought the bill to senate. A projection of strong military defence was supported at the mainstream media, finally the conservative PML(N) ordered the activation of country's nuclear testing program in 1998 for the first time in the history of the country. The nuclear testing program authorized by Prime Minister Sharif was used as "tit for tat" policy in a direct response to Indian nuclear tests in 1998. The nuclear tests in competition with India was highly popular in the country at that time, the conservative PML(N) government had an uttermost public support over that issue. The PML(N) further used its political position after Prime Minister Sharif dismissed the Chairman joint chiefs and chief of army staff, General Jehangir Karamat, marking the perception of civilian control of the military in 1998. The same year, the PML(N) government cancelled the Friday holidays, despite exacerbated concerns of the conservatives. Major education reforms were carried out by PML(N) government, emphasizing on scientific research and religious studies.

In 1999, Prime Minister Sharif struck another political achievement after holding the Lahore Summit, in which, his Indian counterpart, Atal Bihari Vajpayee was delegated to Lahore, Punjab, via a Bus service. Despite peace initiatives with India, the PML(N) government lost all its prestige after becoming militarily involved with India in Kargil sector. Despite his authoritative actions, his economic programmes were failed during the period of worldwide economic growth, especially his attempts to exert intense control over the military ultimately led to his undoing. In 1999, the PML(N) government was dismissed by the Chairman joint chiefs General Pervez Musharraf in a bloodless, rather self-coup d'état. At the time of staging of the coup d'état, conservatism was at its lowest level of support from the public. Further, the support for the PML(N) government and its conservatives programs were largely disapproved by the public.

==== 2010s: Re-defining of New Right and escalations ====
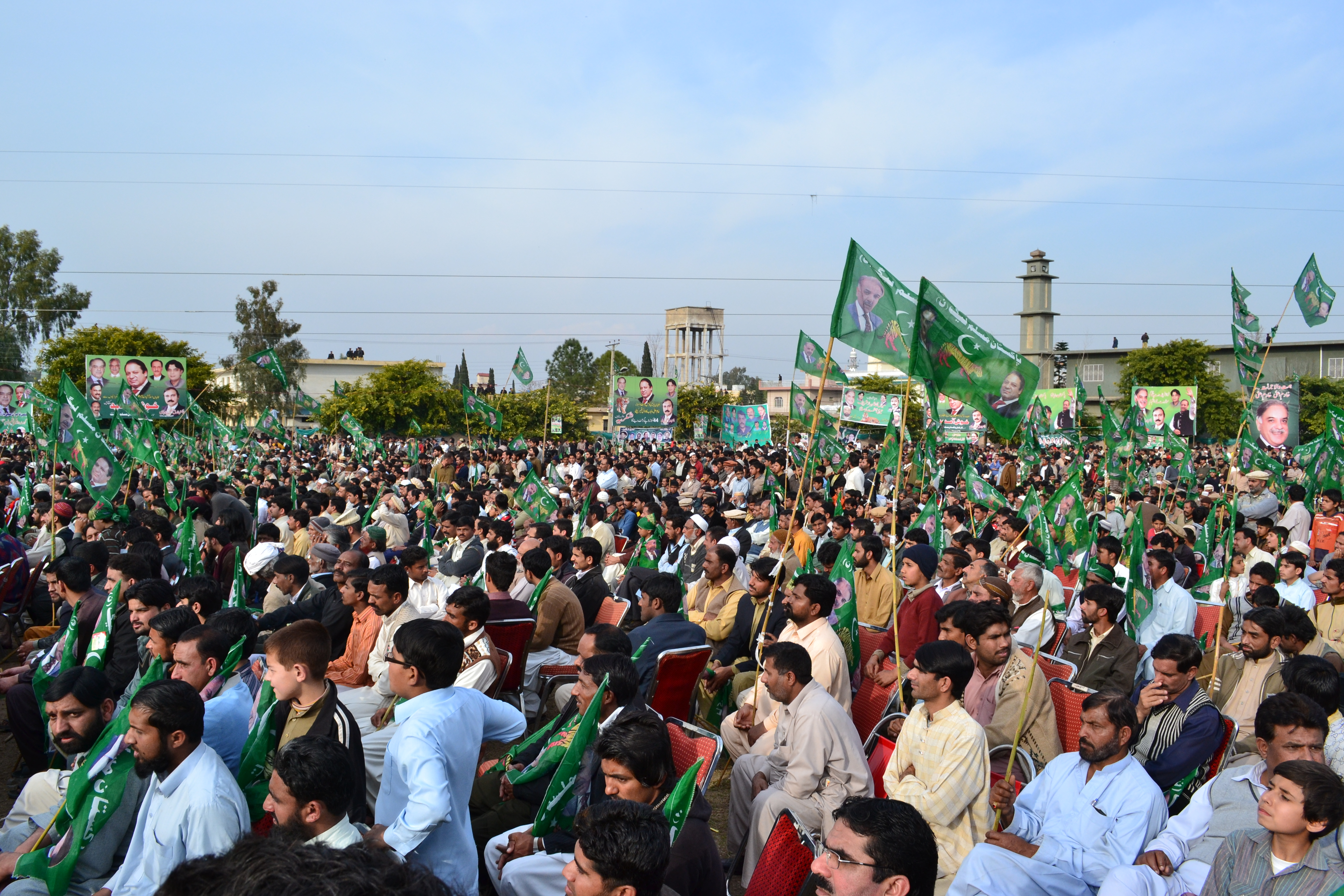
A PMLN rally in 2008

By 2000, conservatism had been its lowest point in popularity since the 1960s. Financial problems, economic stagflation, and social tensions had been a contributory factors in lowering of the conservatism and its opposite, the socialism at once. Searching for a new political philosophy, President Pervez Musharraf called for a "Third Way" after forming the PML(Q) group, totally hostile towards the Pakistan Muslim League.

President Musharraf brought a new generation of liberal thinkers to power in Islamabad. Musharraf pioneered the liberal idea of "Enlightened Moderation" and launched a successful liberalization programs in the country. The 9/11 attacks in the United States and launch of the Afghanistan war in 2001 lead to re-defining moments for the left-wing politics as well as right-wing politics. The 2002 general elections held in 2002 marked the liberals coming into the power, with PML(Q) and MQM forming the government. The religious orthodoxies, under a massive MMA alliance, struck its notable victory in the parliament, securing a considerable number of seats in the parliaments. In 2002, a massive communist party demonstration against the United States and the fierce joint-opposition of PPP and PMLN had politically weakened the government. Historians of Pakistan also noted that the fact that the atomic proliferation debriefings had enraged and outraged the leftists and conservatives alike of their national hero, Dr. Qadeer Khan. Overall, social conservatism and hard leftist ideas grew in an opposition against President Pervez Musharraf, including a far-right insurgency in the country.

==== Influence in popular culture, literary, arts and science ====
The religious identities, nationalism, and rightist ideas has greatly influenced the literature, theatre, architecture, and popular culture.

== Online sources ==
=== Bibliography and references ===
Scholarly books

- Gerges, James Wynbrandt; foreword by Fawaz A. (2008). A brief history of Pakistan. New York: Facts On File. ISBN 978-0816061846.
- Singh, R.S.N. (2008). The military factor in Pakistan. New Delhi: Frankfort, IL. ISBN 978-0981537894.
- LeVine, Mark (2008). Heavy metal Islam rock, resistance, and the struggle for the soul of Islam. New York: Crown Publishing Group. ISBN 978-0307449603.
- Zaman, Hasan; Husain, Syed Sajjad. (1964). Pakistan: an anthology. Dacca, Society for Pakistan Studies.
- Ajay Garg (2010). Angels of the Lost World. New Delhi: Ajay Garg.

== See also ==
- Socialism in Pakistan
- National Commission for Minorities Rights (Pakistan)
