= Ansir Iqbal Baryar =

Pakistani politician (born 1972)

Former Member of the Provincial Assembly of Punjab

Personal details
- Born: May 10, 1972 (age 53)
- Party: PML-Q

Ch Ansir Iqbal Baryar (born May 10, 1972) was a Member of the Provincial Assembly of the Punjab (Pakistan) (2002–2007) and Chairman of the Standing Committee on Literacy and Non-Formal Basic Education.

== Personal background ==
Baryar was born at Sialkot to Ch Inayat Muhammad (father). He received an M.A. in Development Journalism in 2000 and Post Graduate Diploma in Development Support Commission in 1996 from University of the Punjab, Lahore. He is also an industrialist engaged in import and export of sports goods.

== Political career ==
He was elected to the Provincial Assembly in General Elections 2002 (Pakistan Muslim League party), and served as Chairman of the Literacy Committee since September 3, 2003.
