= 2002 Pakistani general election =

- 10 October 2002

All 342 seats in the National Assembly 172 seats needed for a majority
- Registered: 71,866,278
- Turnout: 41.76% (▲5.97pp)
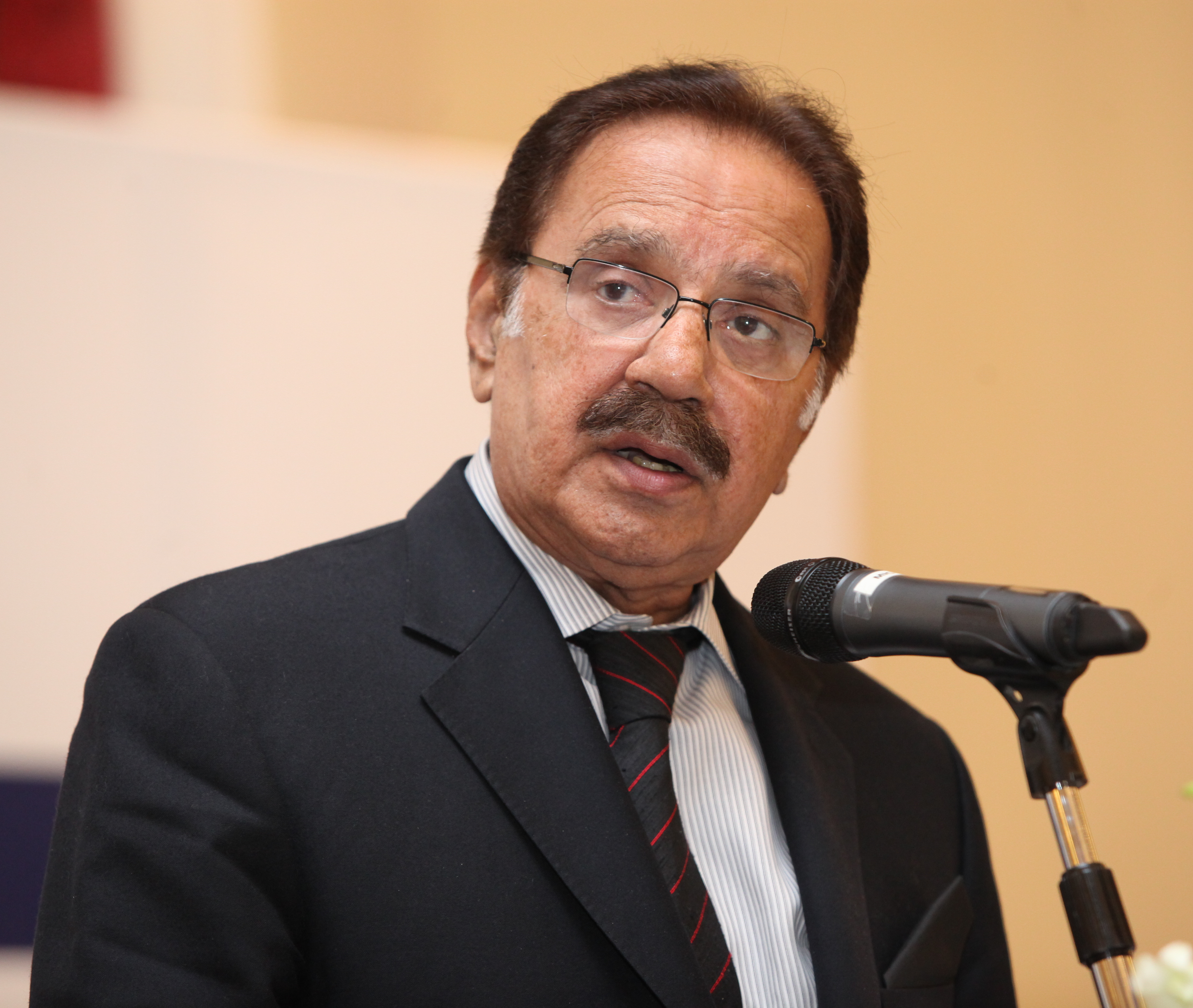

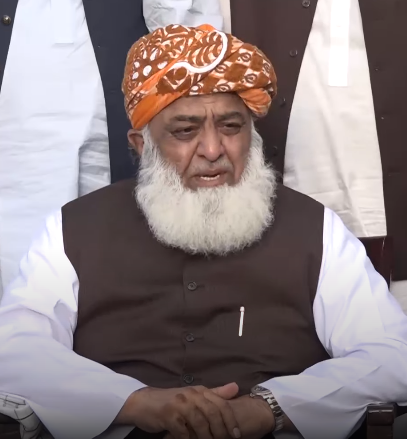

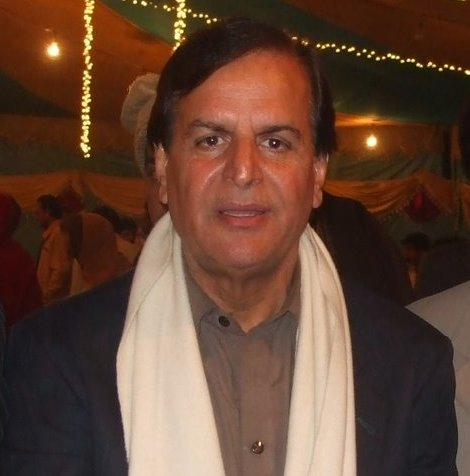
	First party	Second party
Leader	Mian Muhammad Azhar	Ameen Faheem
Party	PML(Q)	PPP
Last election	–	18
Seats won	105	79
Seat change	New	▲61
Popular vote	7,500,797	7,616,033
Percentage	25.66%	26.05%
Swing	New	▲4.76pp
	Third party	Fourth party
Leader	Fazal-ur-Rehman	Javed Hashmi
Party	MMA	PML(N)
Last election	–	135
Seats won	59	19
Seat change	New	▼116
Popular vote	3,335,643	3,409,805
Percentage	11.41%	11.66%
Swing	New	▼33.22pp
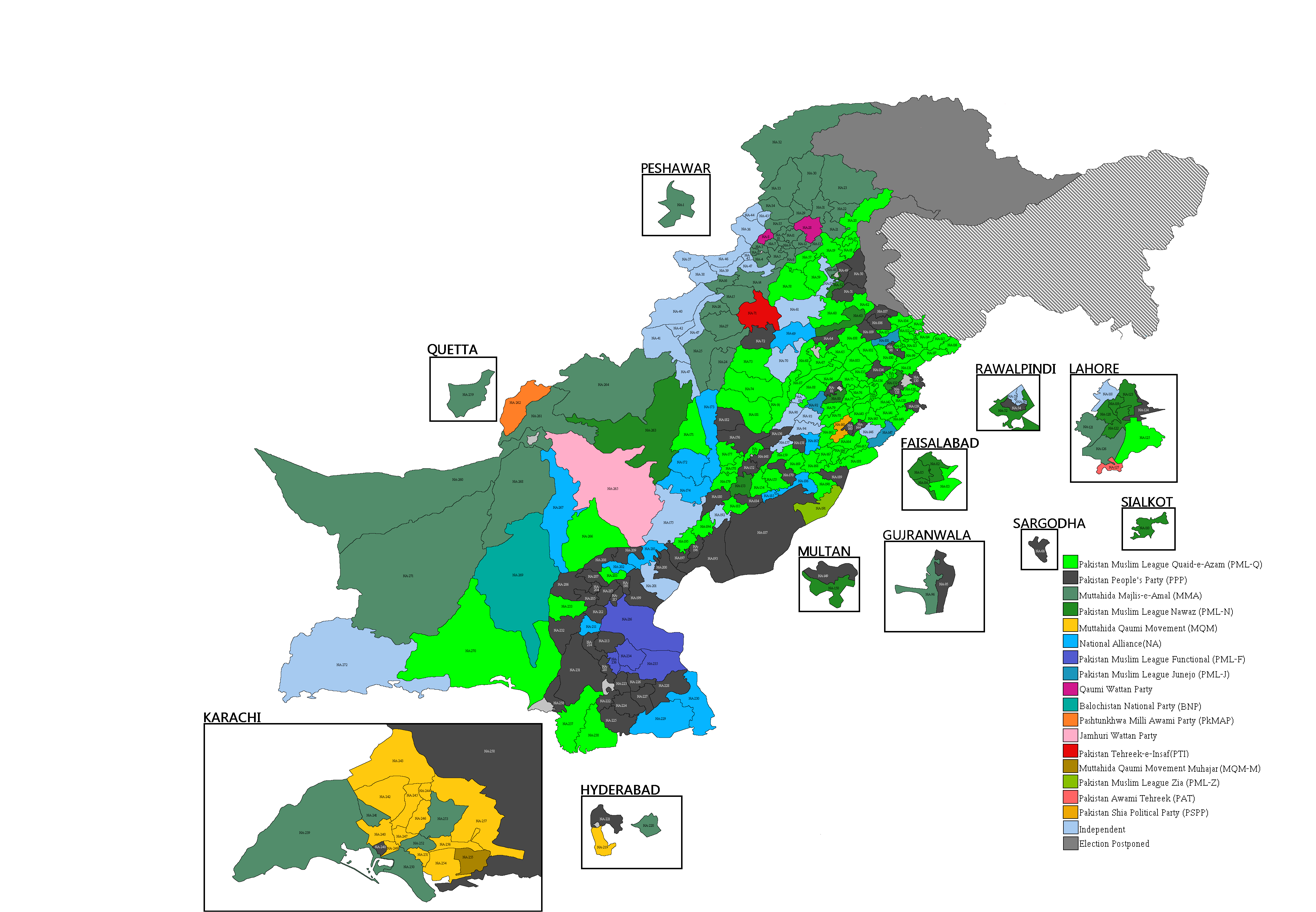
- Results of elections showing political parties.
Prime Minister before election
Pervez Musharraf (as Chief Executive)
Pakistan Armed Forces
Elected Prime Minister
Zafarullah Khan Jamali
PML (Q)

General elections were held in Pakistan on 10 October 2002 to elect the 12th National Assembly and four Provincial Assemblies. The elections were held under the military government of Pervez Musharraf. The two mainstream parties, Pakistan Peoples Party (PPP) and Pakistan Muslim League (N) (PML-N) had several restrictions imposed on them and their leaders Benazir Bhutto and Nawaz Sharif were in exile. In order to address the restrictions, PPP created the Pakistan Peoples Party Parliamentarians (PPPP) under the leadership of Ameen Faheem, to contest the elections on its behalf. The PML-N meanwhile, suffering from the party's division into two factions: one that remained loyal to Sharif and were contesting the elections under the leadership of Javed Hashmi, and the other which had broken away to form the pro-Musharraf Pakistan Muslim League (Q) (PML-Q) under the leadership of Mian Muhammad Azhar. The emergence of the PML-Q marked the beginning of multi-party politics in the country, bringing an end to the decade-long two-party system between the PPP and PML-N.

The newly formed PML-Q - referred to as King's party due to President Musharraf's support - won the highest number of seats in the National Assembly. Despite the absence of Benazir Bhutto, PPPP came at a close second, and actually dominated in terms of popular vote. In opposition to the liberal regime of Musharraf, Islamist parties had organised themselves into the right-wing alliance Muttahida Majlis-e-Amal (MMA) prior to elections. The MMA ended up becoming the third largest party in National Assembly. PML-N suffering from Nawaz Sharif's absence and party split, finished fourth. At the provincial level, PPPP emerged as the largest party in Sindh, PML-Q was triumphant in Punjab, whereas MMA won the most seats in NWFP and Balochistan. With help of other pro-Musharraf parties such as MQM and National Alliance, PML-Q formed a government not only in the Centre but also in all provinces besides NWFP. Since Mian Muhammad Azhar had failed to win a seat himself, PML-Q and its allies agreed on the appointment of Zafarullah Jamali as the next Prime Minister

== Background ==
Following the 1999 Pakistani coup d'état, Nawaz Sharif was removed as Prime Minister of Pakistan and Pervez Musharraf assumed control of the executive branch of the Government of Pakistan. In 2000, the Supreme Court ruled that the coup was legal although had to be legitimised by an election. A referendum was held earlier in 2002 to bring legitimacy to Musharraf's presidency, despite being boycotted by the opposition.

== Parties and candidates ==
More than 70 parties contested the elections. The main parties were the Pakistan Peoples Party Parliamentarians (PPPP), Pakistan Muslim League (Nawaz), Muttahida Quami Movement (MQM), Pakistan Muslim League (Quaid-e-Azam), which was also called the "King's Party" for its unconditional support of the government, and the Muttahida Majlis-e-Amal (MMA), an alliance of six religious political parties.

Other known parties contesting at the national level included the six-party National Alliance led by former President Farooq Leghari, Imran Khan's Pakistan Tehreek-e-Insaf and Tahir-ul-Qadri's Pakistan Awami Tehreek.

== Conduct ==
To control the political landscape, the Musharraf-led government introduced the Political Parties Order, 2002, imposing criteria that effectively disqualified the leadership of the PPP and PML-N from participating in the elections. The administrative machinery, from the police to vote counters, was reportedly aligned with state interests.

Prior to the 2002 elections in Pakistan, the government required citizens to replace old paper identity cards with new computerised national identity cards. Many citizens reportedly did not receive their new cards by the 1 June deadline, leading to accusations that authorities had withheld them from certain groups or planned to issue them selectively on election day.

Allegations of fraud were widespread. I.A. Rehman, director of the Human Rights Commission of Pakistan, cited instances where supporters of the government allegedly produced counterfeit cards at home. Women's identity cards often lacked complete addresses or photographs, enabling false votes, and in some areas, 20 to 30 voters shared the same address. Although officials stated that antifraud safeguards were in place, skepticism persisted. Local reports provided further evidence of irregularities. Authorities in Peshawar were said to have uncovered 24,798 bogus cards, while in Landi Kotal, cards were allegedly denied to those who could not pay a 300-rupee fee. In Larkana, a police investigation reportedly revealed a ring that produced 29,000 fake cards, and candidates in Quetta held protests over alleged ID-card fraud. In Islamabad, a Pakistan People's Party candidate claimed the government had failed to send 80,000 cards to voters in his district.

Journalist Zarrar Khuhro described the elections as heavily manipulated, with disenfranchisement disguised as electoral reform. One controversial reform was the requirement for candidates to hold graduate degrees, a stipulation that excluded many potential candidates due to the educational standards in Pakistan. However, an exception was made for religious scholars, equating madrassah certificates with graduate degrees, thereby favoring the pro-Musharraf Muttahida Majlis-e-Amal alliance and introducing a bias in candidate eligibility.

These elections also saw the reduction in the minimum eligible age to be a voter, from 21 years to 18 years, and the standard 90-day campaign period was shortened to 40 days.

== Results ==
In the National Assembly elections, the PPPP received the most votes but the PML-Q won the most seats, winning 126 to the PPPP's 81. At the provincial level, the MMA emerged as the largest party in Balochistan and North-West Frontier Province. The PML-N lost its stronghold of Punjab to the PML-Q, while in Sindh there was a hung parliament, with the PPP winning more seats than the National Alliance. Voter turnout was 41.8%.

Although the founder of the PML-Q Mian Muhammad Azhar was considered the most likely candidate to become Prime Minister, he failed to win a seat in the National Assembly. Instead a senior party leader Zafarullah Khan Jamali was tasked with leading the new government. Meanwhile, the MMA leader Fazal-ur-Rehman became the Leader of the Opposition.

=== National Assembly ===
Party	Votes	%	Seats			
Party	Votes	%	Constituency	Women	Minority	Total
Pakistan Peoples Party Parliamentarians	7,616,033	26.05	63	14	2	79
Pakistan Muslim League (Q)	7,500,797	25.66	78	23	4	105
Pakistan Muslim League (N)	3,409,805	11.66	15	3	1	19
Muttahida Majlis-e-Amal	3,335,643	11.41	45	12	2	59
National Alliance	1,395,398	4.77	13	3	0	16
Muttahida Qaumi Movement	932,166	3.19	13	3	1	17
Pakistan Muslim League (F)	328,923	1.13	4	1	0	5
Awami National Party	299,067	1.02	0	0	0	0
Pakistan Muslim League (J)	283,755	0.97	3	1	0	4
Pakistan Tehreek-e-Insaf	209,514	0.72	1	0	0	1
Pakistan Awami Tehreek	202,845	0.69	1	0	0	1
Balochistan National Movement	107,355	0.37	0	0	0	0
Pakistan Peoples Party (Sherpao)	98,476	0.34	2	0	0	2
Pashtunkhwa Milli Awami Party	96,252	0.33	1	0	0	1
Jamhoori Wattan Party	96,240	0.33	1	0	0	1
Pakistan Democratic Party	83,976	0.29	0	0	0	0
Pakistan Muslim League (Z)	78,798	0.27	1	0	0	1
Sunni Tehreek	72,583	0.25	0	0	0	0
Balochistan National Party	57,865	0.20	1	0	0	1
Qaumi Movement Pakistan	54,007	0.18	1	0	0	1
Tehreek-e-Istiqlal	43,400	0.15	0	0	0	0
Pakistan Shia Political Party	42,855	0.15	1	0	0	1
Saleem Pakistan Tehreek-e-Insaf	32,958	0.11	0	0	0	0
Pakistan Peoples Party (Shaheed Bhutto)	31,208	0.11	0	0	0	0
Pak Muslim Alliance	22,637	0.08	0	0	0	0
Balochistan National Democratic Party	15,291	0.05	0	0	0	0
Kazmi Nazim-e-Mistafa	11,728	0.04	0	0	0	0
Jamote Qaumi Movement	6,240	0.02	0	0	0	0
Qaumi Jamhoori Party	6,224	0.02	0	0	0	0
Nizam-e-Mustafa Party	5,154	0.02	0	0	0	0
Kakar Jamhoori Party Pakistan	4,074	0.01	0	0	0	0
Mohib-e-Wattan Nowjawan Inqilabion Ki Anjuman (Mnaka)	3,806	0.01	0	0	0	0
Hazara Qaumi Mahaz	3,480	0.01	0	0	0	0
Pak Wattan Party	3,097	0.01	0	0	0	0
Pakistan Awami Party	2,993	0.01	0	0	0	0
Awami Qiadat Party	2,987	0.01	0	0	0	0
National People Party Worker Group	2,515	0.01	0	0	0	0
Pakistan Freedom Party	1,861	0.01	0	0	0	0
Balochistan National Congress	1,832	0.01	0	0	0	0
Ittehad Milli Hazara	1,552	0.01	0	0	0	0
Labour Party Pakistan	1,464	0.01	0	0	0	0
Pakistan Mazdoor Kissan Party	1,437	0.00	0	0	0	0
Tameer-e-Pakistan Party	909	0.00	0	0	0	0
Tehreek Hussainia Pakistan	616	0.00	0	0	0	0
Jamiat Ulema-e-Pakistan (Nifaz-e-Shariat)	581	0.00	0	0	0	0
Pakistan Workers Party	520	0.00	0	0	0	0
Qaumi Inqilab Party	496	0.00	0	0	0	0
Pakistan Gharib Party	422	0.00	0	0	0	0
Saraiki Sooba Movement Pakistan	348	0.00	0	0	0	0
Shan-e-Pakistan Party	276	0.00	0	0	0	0
Mohajir Ittehad Tehreek	262	0.00	0	0	0	0
Pakistan Seriaki Party	225	0.00	0	0	0	0
Shah Moosvi Awami Qiadat Party	202	0.00	0	0	0	0
Sindh Urban-rurel Alliance	165	0.00	0	0	0	0
Labour Party Pakistan (Krandi)	164	0.00	0	0	0	0
Istiqlil Party	151	0.00	0	0	0	0
Pakistan Ittehad Tehreek	145	0.00	0	0	0	0
Pakistan Social Democratic Party	105	0.00	0	0	0	0
Pakistan Awami Tehreek-e-Inqilab	75	0.00	0	0	0	0
Zaheer Markazi Jamat-al-hadais	43	0.00	0	0	0	0
Qaumi Tahaffaz Party	22	0.00	0	0	0	0
Independents	2,722,669	9.31	28	0	0	28
Total	29,236,687	100.00	272	60	10	342
Valid votes	29,236,687	97.42				
Invalid/blank votes	775,720	2.58				
Total votes	30,012,407	100.00				
Registered voters/turnout	71,866,278	41.76				
Source: CLEA, National Assembly

=== Provincial Assemblies ===
==== Punjab ====
Party	Votes	%	Seats
Party	Votes	%	General
Pakistan Muslim League (Q)	6,144,813	33.33	129
Pakistan Peoples Party	4,145,106	22.48	63
Pakistan Muslim League (N)	3,028,856	16.43	38
Others	2,684,000	14.56	29
Independents	2,435,199	13.21	38
Total	18,437,974	100.00	297
Source: Free and Fair Election Network (FAFEN)

==== Sindh ====
Party	Votes	%	Seats
Party	Votes	%	General
Pakistan Peoples Party	2,115,472	35.04	51
Muttahida Qaumi Movement	898,733	14.88	32
National Alliance	718,424	11.90	12
Pakistan Muslim League (Q)	543,590	9.00	11
Others	1,761,752	29.18	24
Total	6,037,971	100.00	130
Source: Free and Fair Election Network (FAFEN)

==== North-West Frontier Province ====
Party	Votes	%	Seats
Party	Votes	%	General
Muttahida Majlis-e-Amal	792,949	26.39	48
Pakistan Peoples Party (S)	291,210	9.69	9
Awami National Party	334,504	11.13	8
Others	1,146,525	38.16	20
Independents	439,258	14.62	14
Total	3,004,446	100.00	99
Source: Free and Fair Election Network (FAFEN)

==== Balochistan ====
Party	Votes	%	Seats
Party	Votes	%	General
Muttahida Majlis-e-Amal	188,878	16.64	13
Pakistan Muslim League (Q)	219,026	19.30	11
National Alliance	92,742	8.17	5
Others	458,827	40.43	15
Independents	175,315	15.45	7
Total	1,134,788	100.00	51
Source: Free and Fair Election Network (FAFEN)

== Election for Prime Minister ==
The election for Prime Minister took place on 21 November 2002.

172 votes required
Candidate	Party	Votes	%
Zafarullah Khan Jamali	Pakistan Muslim League (Q)	172	52.44
Fazal-ur-Rehman	Muttahida Majlis-e-Amal	86	26.22
Shah Mehmood Qureshi	Pakistan Peoples Party	70	21.34
Total		328	100.00
Source: The Guardian
