= Ammar Ali Jan =

Pakistani political activist and author (born 1986)

- عمارعلی جان
- Born: December 15, 1986 (age 39)
- Education: University of Cambridge; University of Chicago
- Occupations: Political organizer, Academic, Writer
- Years active: 2007–present
- Political party: HKP (2022–present)
- Spouse: Tabitha Spence
- Relatives: Ali Ahmed Jan (politician)

Ammar Ali Jan (Note: Urdu: عمار علی جان, romanized: ʿAmmār ʿAlī Jān) (born 15 December 1986) is a Pakistani political activist, academic, and author. He is founder and general secretary of Haqooq-e-Khalq Party, also a member of Progressive International.

Jan is the author of Rule by Fear: Eight Theses on Authoritarianism in Pakistan.

== Early life and education ==
Jan completed his education at the Salamat International Campus for Advanced Studies in 2005, received his Masters in social sciences from the University of Chicago in 2011, and got his doctorate ("A study of Communist Thought in Colonial India, 1919–1951") in history from the University of Cambridge in 2018.

== Career ==
Jan has taught as assistant professor of history in University of the Punjab, Government College University and Forman Christian College, Lahore.

== Political career ==
Jan was member of Labour Party Pakistan. and Progressive Youth Front (PYF).

He was fired from the University of the Punjab in April 2018 for his political views and actions on campus. In 2018, Jan was barred from speaking at the 4th Faiz International Festival along with three other speakers including Taimur Rahman, Ali Wazir, and Rashed Rahman. In Feb, 2019 an FIR against Jan was registered for his participation in a protest against the killing of teacher and poet Arman Loni. In March, 2018 he helped in formation of Lahore Left Front (LLF) with alliance of seventeen like-minded left-wing parties.

As member of the People’s Solidarity Forum, Jan launched Haqooq-e-Khalq Movement (HKM) on May 19, 2018 in Lahore. Jan organized Students Solidarity March while working in HKM. In March 2022, HKM announced that it would register as a political party and contest the local and national elections. HKM was later converted to Haqooq-e-Khalq Party (HKP).

Following the 2024 Pakistani general elections, Jan and the Haqooq-e-Khalq Party (HKP) joined the Tehreek-e-Tahafuz-e-Ayeen-e-Pakistan (TTAP), an opposition alliance led by the Pakistan Tehreek-e-Insaf (PTI). Jan has stated that this coalition was formed to serve as a united front against military involvement in civilian politics.

Jan has publicly criticized the coalition government, alleging that the 2024 elections subverted the public mandate. As part of the TTAP, Jan and the HKP have participated in organizing national strikes and protest marches. During demonstrations in February 2026, the alliance demanded the withdrawal of legal cases against political figures and the release of political prisoners, including former Prime Minister Imran Khan.

In his political commentary, Jan has advocated for a new "National Consensus" and a revised Charter of Democracy. He has argued that establishing constitutional supremacy should take priority over the ideological differences between left-wing organizations and mainstream political parties.

== Articles ==
Jan has published articles in newspapers like The News International, Al Jazeera, The Friday Times, Herald (Pakistan) and few others. He is author of the book ‘Rule by Fear: Eight Theses on Authoritarianism in Pakistan’, Folio Books (November 2021).
