= Pakistan Muslim League =

Right-wing political parties in Pakistan

Pakistan Muslim League پاکستان مسلم لیگ
- Abbreviation: PML
- Historical leaders: Nurul Amin; Pir Pagarah VII; Abdul Qayyum Khan
- Founder: Ayub Khan (1962)
- Founded: 1962; 64 years ago
- Preceded by: ML
- Ideology: Conservatism (Pakistan); Pakistani nationalism Factions: Pro-presidentialism; Pro-parliamentarism

The Pakistan Muslim League (Urdu: پاکستان مسلم لیگ; known as PML), is the name of several different Pakistani political parties that have dominated the centre-right platform in the country.

The Muslim League (the original successor of the All-India Muslim League) was the party of Pakistan's founders. However, it faced multiple fractures soon after Pakistan gained independence in 1947. It vanished in the 1970s. Its revival began in the mid-1980s and today several parties in Pakistan are named Muslim League.

== History ==
=== First phase (1962–1969) ===
The first "Pakistan" Muslim League was founded by President Ayub Khan in 1962 as a successor to the original Muslim League. Just a short period after its foundation, the party broke into two factions: Convention Muslim League that supported the President and the new Constitution, and the Council Muslim League, that opposed the new Constitution, denouncing it as undemocratic that made the Presidency an autocratic position. Following President Ayub's resignation, Nurul Amin, a right-wing political veteran, attempted to reunite the factions of Pakistan Muslim League. His efforts were supported by some, while opposed by others. Before the 1970 Elections, a senior leader of Council Muslim League, Abdul Qayyum Khan formed his own variant of the Muslim League that opposed cooperation with a party that once supported a Dictator. In 1973, Amin's efforts succeeded and the Functional Muslim League (PML-F) was founded.

=== Second phase (1969–1977) ===
After the resignation of President Ayub Khan, Pakistan Muslim League once again united under the leadership of the conservative political veteran, Nurul Amin. Although they were closer ideologically, they were not ready to accept each other's domination. This is the reason that they competed against each other in 1970 elections.

Following the death of Nurul Amin, the PML went into political abyss but made its notable comeback in a direct response to nationalisation and the outgrowth of leftism in the country under the Bhutto administration. In the 1970s, the PML led by Pir Pagara was benefited with the financial support of industrialists, including Nawaz Sharif and Imran Khan, Shujat Hussain, and intelligentsia that included lawyers, Fida Mohammad and Javed Hashmi.

Efforts of Pir Pagara assimilated of majority of the factions of the Pakistan Muslim League, in a bid to mount a strong opposition to the leftist Pakistan Peoples Party (PPP) and rightist Pakistan Muslim League (N) (PML-N) in the 1970s. It may be noted that all factions will continue to hold their individual identities, as the PML was treated as a platform for parties to come together.

=== Third phase (1977–1985) ===
When Pakistan went into martial law in 1977, General Zia-ul-Haq took power after overthrowing the Bhutto government. In 1985, after the election, Zia appointed Muhammad Khan Junejo as the new Prime Minister. Junejo, with a large group of pro-Zia conservatives founded an entirely new party by the name of Pakistan Muslim League. Junejo however soon started to lose the support of party due to his opposition to Zia. Meanwhile, other influential politicians like Nawaz Sharif and Fida Mohammad Khan started to gain power.

After the Death of Zia-ul-Haq in 1988, democracy returned and new 1988 Pakistani general election elections were supposed to be held. Junejo split away from the party and formed Pakistan Muslim League (J). Meanwhile, Fida became the party chairman and Sharif the General-Secretary. Pakistan Muslim League allied with Jamaat-e-Islami and other right-wing parties to form the Islamic Democratic Alliance against the left-wing PPP and centre-right PML-N. This event marked the end of the Pakistan Muslim League.

The Pakistan Muslim League formally dissolved alongside other parties following the 1977 Martial Law, though it supported it. However, it was restored in 1985, when General Zia organised his supporters into a formal party under the leadership of Muhammad Khan Junejo. In 1988, Zia dismissed Junejo and the party split between Pakistan Tehreek-e-Insaf Pakistan Muslim League (N) and the Pakistan Muslim League (J). In 1990, after Zia's death, Pakistan Muslim League came under the leadership of Nawaz Sharif and Imran Khan joined the Islamic Democratic Alliance. In 1993, after the Alliance has been dissolved. After the 1999 Coup, PML-N went into a temporary decline and three new factions of Pakistan Muslim League were founded: Anti-Musharraf PML (Zia), Pro-Musharraf conservative Awami Muslim League and Pro-Musharraf liberal Pakistan Muslim League (Q) (PML-Q).

In 2004, the PML-Q and the PML-F briefly reunited as the Pakistan Muslim League. However, the reunion was unsuccessful and within few days, both the parties went off in separate directions once again.
