= Communist Party of Pakistan =

Communist political party in Pakistan

Communist Party of Pakistan پاکستان کمیونسٹ حزب
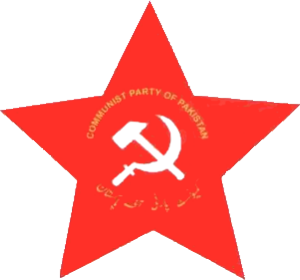
- Abbreviation: CPP
- Secretary-General: Imdad Qazi
- Founder: Sajjad Zaheer
- Founded: 6 March 1948 (78 years ago)
- Split from: Communist Party of India
- Student wing: Democratic Students Federation
- Ideology: Communism; Marxism–Leninism
- Political position: Far-left
- National affiliation: Left Democratic Front
- International affiliation: IMCWP
- Colors: Red

Election symbol
- Sickle (2013 general elections)

Website
- cpp.org.pk

The Communist Party of Pakistan (CPP; Urdu: پاکستان کمیونسٹ حزب) is a Marxist-Leninist party in Pakistan founded in 1948 by Sajjad Zaheer.

== History ==
The Communist Party of Pakistan (CPP) was founded in Calcutta, India, soon after the establishment of Pakistan on 6 March 1948. A decision was taken at the 2nd Congress of the Communist Party of India, which was held in Calcutta at that time, that a separate communist party ought to be created in the new state of Pakistan. It was thought that Pakistan, being a relatively nascent country and suffering from instability, was ripe for revolution. The delegates from Pakistan separated themselves and held a separate session where they constituted the CPP. Sajjad Zaheer, founder of the All-India Progressive Writers Association, from West Pakistan, was elected general-secretary. The delegates from East Pakistan elected an East Pakistan Provincial Committee. Many Muslim leaders of the CPI were sent to Pakistan to help with the formation of the party. The CPP adopted a Leninist ideology, aiming to instigate a communist revolution through a core group of intellectuals and laborers, a strategy inspired by Vladimir Lenin's approach in the 1917 Russian Revolution.

The CPP was indirectly involved in organizing labor and student movements, notably founding the Democratic Students Federation (DSF), which became a major student organization. These affiliations were covert, with CPP members leading without explicit party endorsements.

In 1951, the CPP unintentionally became involved in a failed military coup attempt led by Major-General Akbar Khan, who was disenchanted with government decisions and influenced by Kemal Atatürk's ideologies. The coup was discovered prematurely, resulting in the arrests and subsequent jailing of Zaheer and other CPP figures. The party was banned in 1954 on charges of plotting to overthrow the then government of Prime Minister Liaquat Ali Khan. Previously, Rawalpindi Conspiracy case was registered in 1951 against the coup plotters and crackdown was launched against its leadership throughout the country.

After the incident, the CPP operated underground, using organizations like the DSF and later the National Students Federation (NSF) as fronts. Through a strategy known as Entryism, CPP members infiltrated other leftist parties, notably the National Awami Party (NAP), which had emerged as a major leftist force in Pakistan by the 1960s, supported by ethnic nationalists and secret CPP members within.

== Struggles ==
In 1956 diplomatic intervention by Jawaharlal Nehru led to the most prominent CPP leaders being freed and sent back to India. At this stage, the CPP was in poor shape in West Pakistan, while in East Pakistan the party had a limited foundation. However, it was difficult to have a unified underground political organization spanning such a vast geographical territory and the East Pakistan branch was able to operate with autonomy.

== 1950s ==
In the provincial elections in East Pakistan in 1954, the CPP supported the United Front launched by the Awami League, Krishak Praja Party, and the Nizam-e-Islam party. Four out of ten CPP candidates were elected, and 23 CPP members were elected as candidates of other parties.

In 1954, the party and its front organizations such as the National Students Federation, Progressive Writers' Movement and Railway Workers' Union were banned. As a result, the CPP launched the Azad Pakistan Party (APP) in West Pakistan with Mian Iftikhar-ud-Din as a leader. In 1957, the CPP and other leftists created the National Awami Party as a legal party. The APP merged into the NAP.

In East Pakistan, the CPP worked within the Awami League and then in Ganatantri Dal. In 1958, the Kull Pakistan Kissan Association (All Pakistan Peasants Association) was launched.

== 1960s ==
In the mid-1960s, the US State Department estimated the party membership to be approximately 3000. The CPP also began to organize themselves abroad. In Europe, the CPP branch published the Urdu magazine Baghawat, which translates as "rebellion".

In 1966, the Sino-Soviet split reached the CPP. In East Pakistan a pro-Chinese group broke away from the CPP. At the fourth party congress in Dhaka in 1968, a decision was taken that a separate communist party should be formed for East Pakistan. Thus the Communist Party of East Pakistan (CPEP) was founded. The CPEP later became the Communist Party of Bangladesh. The CPP organized a militant and armed peasants struggle in Baluchistan. The CPP resisted the autocratic regimes of the times, and built up militant trade union movements.

== 1990s ==
In December 1990, Jam Saqi became general secretary of the party. In April 1991, he resigned from the party. In 1995, the CPP merged with the Major Ishaque faction of the Mazdoor Kissan Party to form the Communist Mazdoor Kissan Party (CMKP). The CPP accepted the criticism that they had been too uncritical towards the Soviet Union. However, in 1999, a group broke away from the CMKP and reconstituted the CPP. In 2002, the CPP split, leading to the existence of two separate CPPs, one led by Maula Bux Khaskheli and a splinter group led by Khadim Thaheem.

== Current status ==
The Communist Party of Pakistan (CPP), founded in 1948 by Sajjad Zaheer, remains a small but ideologically consistent Marxist-Leninist party operating outside Pakistan's parliamentary mainstream. Currently led by the Central Committee whose representative is Comrade Imdad Qazi as Secretary General, the CPP is not registered with the Election Commission of Pakistan, which bars it from contesting elections under its own banner. Despite this legal marginalization, it remains active through non-electoral platforms such as the Popular Left Alliance, in alliance with other progressive and left organizations. The party maintains a good roots in class-based activism, organizing among workers, peasants, students (through its student wing, the Democratic Students Federation), women, and intellectuals. It continues to publish its party organ Surkh Parcham and participates in international communist networks like the International Meeting of Communist and Workers' Parties (IMCWP). Although its political visibility is limited in the mainstream media and electoral processes, it consistently issues statements on both domestic and international issues, denouncing imperialism, class oppression, and bourgeois nationalism. The CPP has survived internal splits—most notably in 2002 when a faction broke away under Khadim Thaheem—but has remained organizationally intact under Qazi's leadership since the early 2010s. In a political landscape dominated by right-wing populism, religious parties, and neoliberal formations, the CPP continues to offer a Marxist critique of capitalism in Pakistan, emphasizing grassroots mobilization and class struggle as the path toward revolutionary change of Pakistani society.

== Electoral history ==
2013 Pakistani general election
Election	Votes	%	Seats	+/–
2013	191	0%	0 / 342	Steady

== See also ==
- Politics of Pakistan
- List of political parties in Pakistan
- List of communist parties
