= Secularism in Pakistan =

Pakistan was founded on the concept of the two-nation theory, which was largely based on Muslim nationalism. The Zia-ul-Haq administration in the 1980s decade was anti-secular and Islamist. The supporters of Islamism assert that Pakistan was founded as a Muslim state and that in its status as an Islamic republic, it must thereby implement Islamic laws, known as Sharia. On the other hand, secularists describe that Muhammad Ali Jinnah wanted a state where religious oligarchy will be absent and all Muslims will be liberal, he envisioned for a progressive and liberal Muslim state of Pakistan. The Constitution of Pakistan also prohibits non-Muslims from becoming Prime Minister or President.

One of Pakistan's most popular media outlets, Dawn, was originally founded by Jinnah and still identifies as secular. Other popular media outlets like Express Tribune, Daily Times, and Pakistan Today also identify on a liberal and progressive platform.

== History ==
The 1949 Objectives Resolution envisaged an official role for Islam as the state religion. The state retained most of the laws that were inherited from the secular British legal code that had been enforced by the British Raj since the 19th century.

After the creation of Pakistan, Muhammad Ali Jinnah appointed Jogendra Nath Mandal, a Hindu, as law minister and Zafarullah Khan, an Ahmadiyya, as foreign minister in his first cabinet. Similarly the Pakistani flag was amended to add a white strip to symbolize the religious minorities. However after his death in 1948, debates surrounding Pakistan’s Islamic identity came to dominate political discourse, and in 1956, the state adopted the name of the "Islamic Republic of Pakistan", declaring Islam as the official religion.

== Objectives resolution ==
External videos
- Archived speech of Jinnah on religious freedom

Early in the history of the state of Pakistan (12 March 1949), a parliamentary resolution (the Objectives Resolution) was adopted :

Sovereignty belongs to Allah alone but He has delegated it to the State of Pakistan through its people for being exercised within the limits prescribed by Him as a sacred trust.

- The State shall exercise its powers and authority through the elected representatives of the people.
- The principles of democracy, freedom, equality, tolerance and social justice, as enunciated by Islam, shall be fully observed.
- Muslims shall be enabled to order their lives in the individual and collective spheres in accordance with the teachings of Islam as set out in the Quran and Sunnah.
- Provision shall be made for the religious minorities to freely profess and practice their religions and develop their cultures.

This resolution later became key source of inspiration for writers of Constitution of Pakistan and is included in constitution as preamble.

== Islamization ==
As a reaction to the bifurcation of Pakistan (due to the rise of secessionist movement in East Pakistan) in 1971, Islamic political parties began to see an increase in popular support. In the 1970s, the populist and elected Prime minister Zulfikar Ali Bhutto caved in to a major demand of the Islamic parties by declaring the Ahmadiyya Community to be non-Muslims. Under the constitution of 1973, Bhutto also banned alcohol, gambling and night clubs.

Bhutto was overthrown in 1977 by Chief of Army Staff General Zia-ul-Haq, who went considerably further with the formal campaign of Islamization of Pakistan (1977–1988).

== Secularization ==
The Ayub Khan's administration in the 1960s decade was secular and modernist, he renamed the country from 'Islamic Republic of Pakistan' to 'Republic of Pakistan' in 1962 through constitutional change and in 1964 he banned the Islamist political party Jamaat-e-Islami Pakistan.

Pakistan elected Muslim world's first female prime minister Benazir Bhutto in 1988 (and again in 1993). She did not repeal most of the Islamic laws of Zulfiqar Ali Bhutto (her father) and General Zia-ul-Haq, but promoted secularism through media, cultural policies, general policy making and style of governance, etc.

Military ruler Gen. Pervez Musharraf promoted secularism under the banner of Enlightened Moderation during his nine years long military rule (1999–2008).

Benazir Bhutto's assassination in 2007 and the assassination of Salman Taseer in 2011, a Pakistani politician calling for the removal of the blasphemy laws, have inspired secularists in Pakistani politics, media and civil society. Government led by Bhutto's Pakistan Peoples Party has followed the legacy of Benazir Bhutto's secular style of governance during five years long period (2008–2013).
