= Pakistan Social Democratic Party =

- Chairman: Mujib-ur Rehman Kian
- Deputy Director: Irfan Kausar
- Ideology: Social democracy
- Political position: Centre-left
- International affiliation: Socialist International; Progressive Alliance

Election symbol
- Wristwatch (2002 General Elections)

The Pakistan Social Democratic Party is a political party in Pakistan. In 2002, with a wristwatch as the party's symbol on the ballot, it fielded one candidate in the National Assembly elections and the regional assembly elections, but won no seats. In 2004 the Electoral Commission asked the party, and ten other parties, to have its submitted statement of account audited by a chartered accountant and re-submitted. Thirty-four parties had submitted no statements of account at all, and faced disqualification.

Pakistan Social Democratic Party is run by Mujeeb ur Rehman Kiani, a seasoned lawyer and Chairman of the Party, and Irfan Kausar, deputy director.

The comprehensive manifesto of the party was printed and circulated during its years in active politics. Its founder is author of a publication named 'Responsible Politics', widely sold during the time of its publication. It laid down the predictions and expectations of on coming politics in Pakistan.
