= Communist Party of Pakistan (Thaheem) =

- Leader: Khadim Thaheem
- Founded: 2002
- Split from: Communist Party of Pakistan
- Ideology: Communism

Communist Party of Pakistan is a political party in Pakistan led by Khadim Thaheem. It was formed through a split away from the Communist Party of Pakistan in 2002. Thaheem is the general secretary of the party. Rauf Korai is the Sindh Committee secretary of the party.
