= Haqooq-e-Khalq Party =

Haqooq-e-Khalq Party Pakistan Pakistan People's Rights Party حقوقِ خلق پارٹی پاکستان
- Abbreviation: HKP
- President: Farooq Tariq
- General Secretary: Ammar Ali Jan
- Founded: 8 January 2022; 4 years ago
- Headquarters: Lahore, Punjab, Pakistan
- Ideology: Communism; Marxism; Pluralism
- Political position: Left-wing
- National affiliation: TTAP
- International affiliation: Progressive International
- Colors: Red, White
- National Assembly: 0 / 366
- Senate: 0 / 100

Election symbol
- Megaphone

Website
- www.haqooqekhalq.com

The Haqooq-e-Khalq Party (HKP; Urdu: حقوقِ خلق پارٹی) is a left-wing political party in Pakistan. The party seeks to unify the struggles of workers, peasants, students, women, and ethnic and religious minorities in Pakistan under the banner of a democratic and socialist political system. The Haqooq-e-Khalq Party originated as a grassroots social movement before formally establishing itself as a political party. Initially known as the Haqooq-e-Khalq Movement, it focused on advocating for the rights of marginalized communities and addressing socioeconomic inequalities in Pakistan.

The movement gained traction through community organising, awareness campaigns, and peaceful demonstrations. Its primary concerns included labour rights, access to education and healthcare and economic sovereignty. As the movement's support base grew, its leaders decided to transition into formal politics through a political party. Haqooq-e-Khalq Party was formally registered with the Election Commission of Pakistan in 2022. Ammar Ali Jan is the current general secretary of the party. In the 2024 general elections, the party fielded three candidates: two for National Assembly seats and one for the Punjab provincial assembly.
