= List of Pakistani women writers =

This is a list of women writers who were born in Pakistan or whose writings are closely associated with that country.

== A ==
- Annie Ali Khan (1980 – 21 July 2018), Pakistani writer and journalist
- Shaila Abdullah (born 1971), Pakistani-American short story writer, novelist
- Ishrat Afreen (born 1956), Pakistani-American poet, women's rights activist, educator
- Moniza Alvi (born 1954), Pakistani-British poet
- Altaf Fatima (1927–2018), Pakistani novelist
- Afzal Tauseef (May 18 1936 – December 30 2014), writer, columnist and journalist

== B ==
- Fatima Surayya Bajia (1930–2016), novelist, playwright
- Bano Qudsia (1928-2017) novelist, playwright
- Fatima Bhutto (born 1982), poet, memorist, novelist
- Shahbano Bilgrami, poet, novelist, editor
- Razia Butt (1924–2012), novelist, autobiographer

== C ==
- Zeenat Abdullah Channa, (1919–1974), Short story writer, essayist

== D ==
- Tehmina Durrani (born 1953), autobiographical novelist, author of the widely translated My Feudal Lord

== F ==
- Bushra Farrukh (born 1957), poet
- Samira Fazal (born 1976), playwright, screenwriter

== H ==
- Yasmeen Hameed, since 1988, poet, educator
- Zaib-un-Nissa Hamidullah (1921–2000), Indian-born Pakistani journalist, columnist, non-fiction writer, women's rights activist
- Shahida Hassan, since the mid-1990s, poet
- Zahida Hina, since 1962, essayist, journalist, columnist, short story writer, novelist
- Shahrukh Husain (born 1950), novelist, non-fiction writer, living in London
- Fahmida Hussain (born 1948), literary scholar, non-fiction writer
- Hseena Moin top Writer حسینہ معین) (20 November 1941 – 26 March 2021) was a Pakistani dramatist, playwright and scriptwriter.

== I ==
- Shaista Suhrawardy Ikramullah (1915–2000), politician, essayist, autobiographer
- Saba Imtiaz, journalist, author, screenwriter
- Farhat Ishtiaq (born 1980), novelist, screenwriter, author of Humsafar

== J ==
- Ayesha Jalal, Pakistani-American educator, historian, since 1990: non-fiction writer
- Kanza Javed, a Pakistani educator and writer: fiction.

== K ==
- Manmeet Kaur (fl 2000s), Sikh journalist
- Uzma Aslam Khan (born 1969), Pakistani novelist
- Rukhsana Khan (born 1962), Pakistani-Canadian children's writer
- Maki Kureishi (1927–1995), poet

== L ==
- Yasmeen Lari (born c.1941), architect, non-fiction writer

== M ==
- Muniba Mazari
- Shazia Mirza (British Comedian and Writer) Columnist for The Guardian

== N ==
- Asma Nabeel (fl 2000s), screenwriter, poet
- Kishwar Naheed (born 1940), poet, feminist
- Badam Natawan, (1924–1988), novelist, prose writer
- Sarwat Nazir, contemporary novelist, playwright, screenwriter, author of Main Abdul Qadir Hoon (2010)
- Amina Nazli (1914–1996), writer, editor, feminist
- Zehra Nigah, since 1950s, poet, screenwriter
- Nemrah Ahmed Khan, (born 1990), writer, novelist
- Najeeba Arif, (born 1964), writer, novelist, poet

== R ==
- Bushra Rahman (1944–2022), politician, novelist
- Samina Raja (1961–2012), poet, translator, educator
- Fahmida Riaz (1946–2018), poet, translator, feminist

== S ==
- Afia Salam (fl 1980s), journalist
- Sehba Sarwar, contemporary novelist, short story writer, author of Black Wings (2004)
- Sara Shagufta (died 1984), poet
- Bina Shah, since 2001, short story writer, novelist, columnist
- Qaisra Shahraz, since 2001, novelist, short story writer, living in Britain
- Parveen Shakir (1952–1994), poet, educator
- Kamila Shamsie (born 1973), English-language novelist
- Muneeza Shamsie, essayist, anthologist, literary writer
- Bapsi Sidhwa (1938–2024), English-language novelist, living in the United States
- Noorul Huda Shah (born 1957), playwright, novelist, Short story writer and Dramatist
- Salma Shaheen (born 1954), poet, writer, researcher and novelist

== T ==
- Naseem Thebo, (1948–2012), story writer

== U ==
- Umera Ahmad (born 1976), short story writer, novelist, playwright, author of Pir-e-Kamil

== Y ==
- Malala Yousafzai (born 1997), Nobel Peace Prize winner, female education activist, memoirist

== Z ==
- Sumaira Zareen (1944–1977), story writer
- Zaitoon Bano (18 June 1938 — 14 September 2021), fiction writer, poet

== See also ==
- List of women writers
