= List of student federations in Pakistan =

Student federations have been growing in popularity and significance in Pakistan over the past few years. This has been attributed to the increasing social disparity between the younger and older generation of the country. 66% of population of Pakistan is currently under the age of 30, and approximately only 5% of the population is over the age of 65. Researchers have noted the significance of political youth organisations in social environments such as these, and have project that the youth organisations in Pakistan will help define the future of the nation over the next few years. Reporters have noted that Pakistan's political climate is in a current state of divisive unrest. Political actions taken within the country have simultaneously sparked public celebrations and large-scale riots. Because of the demographics of the country, the population under age 30 has been very involved in these public actions, and the youth and student organisations have been prominent. A new student organisation, mathematical society GPGC Haripur was formed on 1 January 2023, under the patronage of Professor Naeem Akhtar Abbasi, chairmanship of Professor Aftab Ahmed, coordination of Professor Syed Bilal Shah and presidency of Syed Hamza Kazmi. The society has more than 30 members.

== Background ==
The first student political group in Pakistan was the Muslim Students Federation. Started in 1947, as a student wing of the Muslim League, the Muslim Students Federation held prominence in Pakistan until the Muslim League splinted shortly after coming to power. The 1950s saw the rise of two kinds of political student parties; Left leaning Marxist parties like the Democratic Students Federation, and religious right wing parties like Anjuman Talba-e-Islam and Islami Jamiat-e-Talaba. The leftist groups were not treated kindly by the ruling powers at the time, and in 1953 during a protest led by the Democratic Student Federation, the police shot into the crowd killing six students. The next year the same group was banned from the country for its possible ties to the Communist party of Pakistan, followed shortly thereafter by a ban of its successor group the All Pakistan Students Organisation. These groups were succeeded by yet another leftist group, the National Students Federation, which continues on to this day.

The student unions in the 1960s were characterised primarily as a struggle between the Maoist-Marxist left and the religious right, with the leftist National Students Federation and the National Students Organisation coming out on top. The 1970s brought with it a rise in student political action as the 1974 Student Union Ordinance was passed. This Ordinance actually encouraged student activity on campus, and several prominent new student organisations came into existence and grew during this time. Meanwhile, the struggle between the leftist and religious student associations grew with both sides creating their own respective alliances, though both groups suffered from political infighting and splintering.

Through the late 1970s and into the 1980s the student groups began to clash violently with each other and the government.

== Current issues ==
There are currently three major issues driving the political activist groups in Pakistan which are a lack of educational opportunities, jobs and ideological differences.

=== Education ===
The public education system has three major problems facing it right now. First, there is a shortage of teachers and schools within the country. Approximately 33% of the children in Pakistan are not attending school, and even the ones who are may not have an actual teacher in the classroom. Second, the public education system is outdated by over 30 years. The textbooks used in the majority of public schools were written in the 1980s and they tend to lead students to be more susceptible to adaptation to radical forms of Islam. Third is the stark difference between the private and public education systems. The top ten percent of the country send their children to private schools that speak English, instead of Urdu, and most children coming out of the private education system tend to be dismissive of their Urdu-speaking counterparts. This is creating a strong communication and familial rift between the educated population of Pakistan.

=== Jobs ===
The job market in Pakistan is not promising for students coming out of the education system. The unemployment rate in 2008 was estimated at 24.67%. This was attributed to a large part of the student population getting educated for technical jobs that are not in high demand in the country. Approximately 85% of Pakistanis only make $4 per day, which is not an appealing prospect to college graduates in Pakistan. This disparity of expectations is mobilising factor behind a significant number of student federations.

=== Ideological differences ===
The student federations of Pakistan have been known to engage in fights over political, religious, ethnic, nationalist, and sectarian differences. Several students die each year in the physical confrontations that frequently break out between groups during protests.

== Students Islamic Federations ==
=== Islami Jamiat-e-Talaba Pakistan (IJT) ===
Islami Jamiat-e-Talaba is the largest student organisation founded just after the independence of Pakistan on 23 December 1947. It is affiliated with Jaamat-e-Islami. It is mainly influenced by the ideology of Syed Abul A'la Maududi. It is the only student organisation in Pakistan that is present throughout the country and Bangladesh and at various levels i.e schools, colleges and universities.

=== Anjuman Talaba-e-Islam ===
Anjuman Talaba-e-Islam ("Islamic Organisation of Students") is the non-political student organisation founded on 20 January 1968 with respect to 20th Shawwal 1387 A.H at Sabz Masjid Sarafa Bazaar, Karachi, Pakistan by a group of students. In 1986 student union elections in all cities of Pakistan, ATI came forward as the leading victorious Student Organisation by taking more than 80% results. The current President is Mubashar Hussain from Karachi, Pakistan.

=== Pakistan Islamic Students Federation ===
It is unclear when the Pakistan Islamic Students Federation (PISF or APISF) was founded, though its internet presence was established on 24 February 2012. PISF is an Islamic group in Pakistan best known for its protests of Danish Prime Minister Anders Fogh Rasmussen and the Danish cartoons depicting Muhammad where they called for the public hanging of the Danish cartoonists.

=== Imamia Students Organisation ===
Imamia Students Organisation is a Shi'a Muslim students organisation in Pakistan. It was founded by Dr. Mohammad Ali Naqvi on 22 May 1972 at University of Engineering and Technology, Lahore. In 2012 it had "around 1200 units in Pakistan," covering all the five provinces of Pakistan, the Tribal Areas, Azad Kashmir and Gilgit Baltistan.

The Goal of this organisation is to set the lives of the young generation in accordance with the teachings of Quran and Mohammad-o-Aal-e-Mohammad (as) so that they may become good human beings and mumins and may defend the Highness of the Holy Religion and the geographical and ideological boundaries of Pakistan.

Allegations were directed against ISO that they receive funding from Iran. ISO counters those allegations, stating that they only receive moral guidance from Iran.

=== Muslim Student Federation ===
Muslim Student Federation or MSF is a conservative Pakistani political group that was started on 1 September 1937 in Calcutta, India by the old All-India Muslim League. The group has a wing in Pakistan led by Rana Arshad and Rana Hassnain leading in Punjab as senior vice president along with coordinator Green Tiger. The student federation has also been known to engage in fights previously with some of the progressive student federations and exhibit an independent mildly conservative nature.

In Pakistan MSF-N is aligned to the PML-N which is a major centre-right party in the country.

== Progressive and Marxist groups ==
=== The Struggle ===
The Struggle (Urdu: طبقاتی جدوجہد) is a Trotskyist, Leftist organisation in Pakistan which was found in Netherlands by Lal Khan and other Pakistani activists. The group follows the ideology of Karl Marx, Friedrich Engels and Leon Trotsky.

It is the only organisation working physically into people and politicising students and workers.

The Struggle group has their own publication agency and has published numerous books and leaflets on topics including Marxist ideology, history of Marxist struggle in Pakistan, and various books covering history of Bolshevik revolution.

The Struggle's trade union front is known as Pakistan Trade Union Defence Campaign (PTUDC), and multiple other fronts working among Youth, including Revolutionary Students Front (RSF) and Unemployed Youth Movement. In 2015, youth and students fronts of the Struggle started a campaign to bring together prominent left-wing students and youth organizations from across the country on a single platform. It holds its regularly congress which are held every year to analyse the performance of The Struggle and to formulate new strategies for social change and revolution. In March 2013, Malala Yousafzai sent solidarity message to The Struggle congress.

=== Democratic Students Federation (DSF) ===
Democratic Students Federation founded in 1949, and being the oldest leftist student federation in Pakistan many other left leaning student political organizations can trace their heritage back to this group. The DSF was banned in 1956 because of its political association with the communist party, which resulted in several other student groups forming from its ashes, like the National Students Federation and the Liberal Students Federation. The DSF was allowed to reorganise in 1980, and grew in popularity because of its connection to the then powerful Soviet Union. This popularity faded after dissolution of the Soviet Union, and the group restructured itself in 2011 to adapt to more current issues. The groups stated mission is to "bring back the balance of power to the students in universities which was formerly lost." Nowadays, both the NSF and ISF claim common heritage from the old DSF.

=== JUTT Student Federation ===
JUTT Students Federation was formed in 2010 as a faction/group that split off from the original National Students Federation (NSF). Its Chairman is Ijaz Jutt and General Secretary is Umar Saleem Ghumman .

=== National Students Federation ===
National Students Federation (NSF) was formed from the remnants of the Democratic Students Federation when it was banned in 1956. The group is a self-proclaimed revolutionary left and centre-left student federation whose stated goals are to:

1. Struggle for a class free education system and all rights of the student community
2. Struggle for free education for all
3. Struggle for improvement in the conditions of all educational institutes
4. Promote peace, tolerance and unity amongst students
5. To link students with the international movements against capitalist, imperialist oppression.

In 2008 the group was reorganised during the Lawyers' Movement, and now primarily operates out of Punjab, though its values remain mostly the same and just like the old DSF, gave birth to the powerful NSF, it has helped birth the programme of the newly formed Insaaf Student Federation (ISF).

=== Liberal Students Federation ===
Liberal Students Federation was formed in 1973 as a faction/group that split off from the National Students Federation.

=== Insaaf Students Federation ===
This is the student federation of PTI and generally has links to the old NSF and considers itself on the left and centre left on the basic issues of students. It is considered the student body of PTI Insaafins and its future leaders. The ISF Insaafins are more progressive and left-wing than its parent party and has some links with the NSF and LSF.

=== Peoples Students Federation ===
Peoples Students Federation is a students-led organisation attempts to mobilise the youth for Peoples Party candidates for the Youth Parliament. It also has the separate Trotskyist-Marxist wing. The Peoples Students Federation was a member of the International Marxist Tendency (IMT) with the goal of achieving Stalinism but recently, it and its parent party has become pro-American in Pakistani politics unlike the ISF and their parent party, the PTI.

=== All Pakistan Muttahida Students Organisation ===
The All Pakistan Muttahida Students Organization Urdu: (آل پاکستان متحدہ اسٹوڈنٹس آرگنائزیشن) (APMSO) is notable for being the student organisation that created Pakistan's 4th Notional Political Party, the Mohajir Quami Movement, now called the Muttahida Qaumi Movement (MQM).

APMSO was founded by Altaf Hussain along with other students include Azeem Ahmed Tariq, Dr. Imran Farooq and others on 11 June 1978 at Karachi University. Hussain also served as a first Chairman of the organisation while Azeem Ahmed Tariq served as the first General Secretary of the organization.

While the APMSO platform has some liberal elements to it, at its core it is the ethnic political party of the Muhajir, an Urdu speaking people who immigrated from India in 1947. It was later renamed the All Pakistan Muttahida Students Organization (APMSO) and is still known by this name. It organizes many activities for general students.

=== Progressive Students Federation ===
Progressive Students Federation (PrSF) is a socialist, left-wing students’ organisation based in Pakistan, formed in 2014.

== List of student federations, political alliances, and affiliations ==
Notable student federations include:

Name	Affiliation
Islami Jamiat-e-Talaba	Jamaat-e-Islami Pakistan
Anjuman Talaba-e-Islam (ATI)	Independent
Hazara Student Federation	Hazara Democratic Party
Imamia Students Organisation	Independent
Insaf Students Federation	Pakistan Tehreek-e-Insaf
Liberal Students Federation	Independent
National Students Federation	National Awami Party
Peoples Students Federation	Pakistan Peoples Party
APMSO (Pakistan faction)	Muttahida Qaumi Movement – Pakistan
BSO (Mengal)	Balochistan National Party (Mengal)
BSO (Pajjar)	National Party
Progressive Students Federation	-
