= Sindhiani Tahreek =

Sindhi women's organisation

- Formation: 1981; 45 years ago
- Type: Non-governmental
- Headquarters: Sindh, Pakistan
- Region served: Sindh
- President: Umrao Samoon

Sindhiani Tahreek (Sindhi: سنڌياڻي تحريڪ, "Sindhi women's movement") (also known as The Sindhiyani Tehreek) is a women-led political organization formed by rural women in Sindh, the southern province of Pakistan.

== History ==
Sindhiyani Tehreek was launched in 1980 by rural women of Sindh province of Pakistan to fight the discriminatory laws against women promulgated by Zia's regime. The founding women were members of the Awami Tehreek, a Left-leaning Sindhi political party. Ideologically, the Sindhiyani Tehreek was influenced by Marxism-Leninism-Maoism. The organization's membership consisted of peasant women, students, school teachers, educated housewives and professional women. Sindhiyani Tehreek fought against honour killings, forced conversion and unequal distribution of land.

Allied with Awami Tahreek in Sindh, Sindhiani Tahreek endeavoured to make women aware of larger provincial issues such as using the Sindhi language in schools and political institutions in the province, accelerating practice of auctioning land to non-Sindhi people, and the growing Sindhi nationalism. Sindhiani Tahreek fully participated with shoulder to shoulder with their men comrades in MRD against General Zia ul Haq's military dictatorship.

=== 1980s ===
Sindhiyani Tehreek joined Anti-Kalabagh Dam movement in late ‘80s. Members participated in long marches in hot summer days, they walked on foot, with their children hanging around their waist. The marches include hundreds of Sindhi women. Benazir Bhutto also joined them in late ‘90s, in one of their protests in Obauro near Ghotki then during the Long March to Karachi from Sukkur.

=== 2000s ===
The movement is now divided into three factions, one led by Rasool Bux Palijo, second led by, Ayaz Latif Palijo and third called "Sindhi Aurantan Ji Tanzeem" (Sindhi Women's Movement) (a front of the Awami Jamhoori Party), is led by Zahida Dahri and Nazir Qureshi. The last two have a good presence in several districts including Karachi and Hyderabad. Members of Sindhiani Tahreek participated in Aurat March in 2020.

== Notable members ==
- President: Umrao Samoon
- Former president: Zeenat Samoon
- Members include: Hajiani Lanjo, Nazeer Qureshi, Ghazala Siddiqui, Zahida Sheikh Zarina Baloch, Shahnaz Rahoo, Khairunisa Khoso, Shama Bhatti, Sahibzadi Dahri, Mumtaz Nizamani, Naseem Sindhi, Husna Rahujo Subahni Dahri, Noorbano Mallah, Zarina Kalrani, Fatima Halepoto, Lakshmi, Shamshad Leghari, Noor Nisa Palijo, Saleha Gopang, Husna Nahiyo and Sakina Memon.
