= Jam Saqi case =

The Jam Saqi trial (or Jam Saqi case), was a political and judicial program in the history of Pakistan marked by a rise of widespread fear of expansion of communism and the socialism. There were series of federal investigations led by the FIA and federal prosecution trials conducted by the specialized military courts in which the leaders of the communist and socialist parties were accused of plotting to overthrow the military government in order to install a socialist system.

During this period, thousands of Pakistani political workers and dissidents were accused of being communists, and hatching a plot against the martial law which was in effect since 1977. The first trial implicated in 1980 and all trials were conducted at the special sessions held at the Karachi Central Jail. Primarily, the leaders of the communist party were convicted whilst socialists were acquitted from the trial in the mid 1980s.

== Origins ==
=== Communism and struggle ===
The historical judicial period that has come to be known as "Jam Saqi case" began well before the trial was launched in the 1980s. Many factors contributed to this inquiry, some of them extending back to the year 1950 with the first case, further amplified by Communism's emergence as a recognized political force. After the general elections held in 1977, the military imposed martial law throughout the land to ease the social unrest in the country. The Pakistan Peoples Party (PPP), Communist Party of Pakistan (CPP), and other leftist political parties condemned the act. Unofficially, the PPP government destroyed the ban on the CPP; as a result, the presence of communist literature in Pakistan became stronger.

On the other hand, the right-wing groups further consolidated in opposition to the socialist influence in the country. The extremism on both sides grew as did support for a statutory prohibition of such activities in the 1980s. The USSR's invasion of Afghanistan gave President Zia-ul-Haq an opportunity to legitimatize his regime in the country with the Western support.

In 1978, the FIA arrested communist leader, Jam Saqi, and raided two houses in Karachi. Saqi was booked for a trial set up by the military government in 1980 . In addition, the FIA director Azam Qazi ordered his agents to begin gathering information on the leftist groups uniting under a common platform; all were acquitted in the trial by the federal prosecutors. This marked the second case against the Communist Party of Pakistan; the first was the Rawalpindi Conspiracy case instituted in the 1950s.

Under this program, a few of the more notable people who were blacklisted or suffered some other persecution are listed here:

- Jam Saqi— Secretary-General of the Communist Party of Pakistan (CPP)
- Benazir Bhutto – Chairperson of the Pakistan Peoples Party
- Abdul Wali— President of Awami National Party (ANP)
- Ghaus Bux Bizenjo— Intellectual and politician
- Sohail Sangi— Journalist
- Mirage M. Khan – Communist activist of the PPP
- Nazeer Abbasi— Communist activist of the CPP
- Kamal Warsi— Journalist
- Shabbeer shar— journalist

Primarily, the investigations and inquiry focused on the Communist Party's Secretary-General, Jam Saqi. Although, the inquiries were expanded to the left-wing parties of the country, whereas Benazir Bhutto repeatedly appeared in the military courts sessions led by Colonel Atiq Hussain. She was inquired from 27 March until 29 March 1983, after being cleared by Colonel Atiq. At one point, Benazir Bhutto, in the defense of Saqi, declared that "she did not accept the military courts." She further testified that "Jam Saqi is a patriotic citizen of the state" and demanded his release. Other accuses were Karachi University's professor Jamal Naqvi, Amar Lal, journalists Sohail Sangi, Badar Abro, Kamal Warsi and Shabbir Shar. Jam Saqi was arrested on 10 December 1978 but was implicated in this case which was lodged about two years later. Naqvi, Abbasi, Warsi and Shar were arrested on 30 July 1980, while Sangi was arrested on 31 July 1980.

== Participants ==
- Defense witnesses: Top political leadership including Ms Benazir Bhutto, Mir Ghaus Bux Bezinjo, Khan Abdul Wali Khan, Maulana Shah Mohammed Amroti, Mairaj Mohammed Khan, Fatehyab Ali Khan, among the journalists Minhaj Burna, Afzal Siddiqui, Shaikh Ali Mohammed, Shaikh Aziz, Abdullah. J Memon then commissioner, Abdul Ghani Dars (Journalist) and others appeared as defense witnesses.
- Defense Counsels: The defense counsels were Abdul Wadood, Mohammed Yousuf Leghari, Akhtar Hussain, Ali Amjad Advocate and Shafi Mohammedi.
