= Masuma Hasan =

Pakistani civil servant, diplomat, and scholar

Masuma Hasan is a Pakistani civil servant, diplomat, and scholar who serves as Chairman of The Pakistan Institute of International Affairs and president of the board of governors of Aurat (Women's) Foundation. In her public service career, she rose to the position of Cabinet Secretary, the highest post in the civil service. She was Pakistan's Permanent Representative to the United Nations Office in Vienna (UNOV), where she chaired the Group 77 nations, and was the first woman faculty member to head a management and consultancy organization in the public sector. Her struggle to make a place for herself in the patriarchal administrative and political system in her country has become a landmark in the larger movement for gender equality and women's rights.

== Family ==
Masuma Hasan, born 30 April 1941 in Delhi, British India, is the eldest child and only daughter of Sarwar Hasan and Sughra Begum. Their family was one of the oldest settled families of northern India and claims descent from Abdullah Ansari, Pir of Herat. Her ancestor, Khwaja Malik Ali, migrated to India from Herat in Khorasan on the invitation of Emperor Balban in 1286. In recognition of his learning, Balban bestowed upon him vast estates and judicial office in Panipat. They were a family of scholars and jurists and practiced hikmat, and scholarship has remained their hallmark throughout.

The members of the family journeyed to other parts of India in search of education and livelihood but retained their link with Panipat for 700 years. However, during Partition, they were uprooted and forced to migrate to Pakistan, abandoning their homes and vast estates.

Masuma Hasan's parents settled in Karachi in August 1947. Her father was a barrister and the founder of the independent Pakistan Institute of International Affairs, the oldest think tank in Pakistan. His seminal work was Pakistan and the United Nations She was brought up in a cultural fusion of family traditions and modern learning. In her education and upbringing, she was greatly influenced by her father's liberalism, his belief in democratic values and the rule of law, and his love and admiration for Muslim civilization in the Indian subcontinent.

== Education ==
As her parents sank their roots in their new land, Masuma Hasan enrolled to study at St. Joseph's Convent High School, founded in 1862 and run by nuns belonging to the Belgian Order of the Daughters of the Cross, and St. Joseph's College for Girls. She earned her master's degree in political science from the University of Karachi in 1962, obtaining first position. The same year, she went on a government scholarship to the University of Cambridge, UK, where she completed her PhD in politics under the supervision of the eminent historian, Nicholas Mansergh. Nicholas Mansergh was the editor-in-chief of the monumental 12 volumes of The Transfer of Power in India 1942-47 (London, HMSO, 1979–1983). The subject of her doctoral thesis was 'The Transfer of Power to Pakistan and its Consequences.'

== Public service career ==
She joined the public service in Pakistan in 1967 as a faculty member of the National Institute of Public Administration (NIPA) Karachi, rising to the post of director, the first woman and faculty member to occupy that position in any official management and consultancy institution. Later, she held senior positions in the Management Services Division.

In 1995, she was appointed Pakistan's multilateral and bilateral ambassador to Vienna. She was Permanent Representative to the United Nations Office in Vienna (UNOV), the United Nations Industrial Development Organisation (UNIDO), the International Atomic Energy Agency (IAEA), and other international organizations in Vienna, including those dealing with drugs and outer space. She also served as Ambassador to Austria, Slovenia, and Slovakia. She chaired the Group of 77 at the United Nations in Vienna in 1996, the first woman diplomat to chair any Group of 77 chapter.

In 2000, she was appointed Cabinet Secretary to the Pakistan government, the highest post in the civil service. At that time, she was the senior-most civil servant in Pakistan.

As Cabinet Secretary, she facilitated and piloted two important national decisions:

- Adoption of a unified standard code plate in Urdu (Urdu Zabita Takhti) for computer applications, setting up an international standard which enabled millions of people globally to access the World Wide Web, internet, and email in Urdu. The cabinet approved the proposal on 23 August 2000.
- Declassification of the Hamoodur Rahman Commission Report on the secession of East Pakistan on 30 December 2000.

== Political links ==
In 1969, she married Fatehyab Ali Khan, a political activist who led the movement of the youth against the dictatorship of General Ayub Khan in 1960–62. He later became president of the Pakistan Mazdoor Kissan Party and was a prominent leader of the Movement for Restoration of Democracy (MRD), 1980–88, against the dictatorship of General Ziaul Haq. Her husband's political commitments and numerous prison terms cast a long shadow on her career. During the MRD, she was sent on compulsory leave and transferred to Islamabad while her husband was in prison. The decade of the 1980s was particularly harsh for her family as she was constantly under surveillance, frequently transferred, and had to leave her two young children behind in Karachi.

== Contribution to Academia and Reforms ==
Masuma Hasan was a member of the Aga Khan University's International Task Force on the Institute for the Study of Muslim Civilizations (ISMC) (1999–2001) and a member of Aga Khan University's Thinking Group on the Graduate School of Public Policy (GSC) (2016–18). She has been closely associated with her alma mater, the University of Karachi, as a member of its Syndicate (1998–2000) and currently serves on its Senate, Syndicate, and Selection Board. She was also a member of the Senate of the Federal Urdu University of Arts Science and Technology (FUUAST) (2011–18) and served on the boards of Sustainable Development Policy Institute (SDPI) Islamabad (2003–10) and the Institute of Business Administration, Karachi. The Government of Pakistan appointed her as a member of its Services Reforms Commission (1991–1994).

== Public interest commitments ==
- a) Women's empowerment: Since 1986, Masuma Hasan has been associated with Aurat Foundation, Pakistan's leading women's empowerment organization, first as treasurer and currently as president of the board of governors. She has worked for pro-women laws, legislation against domestic violence, and the rights of marginalized women and widows in society.
- b) The Pakistan Institute of International Affairs: She has long been a member of The Pakistan Institute of International Affairs (PIIA), an independent think tank, and is currently its chairman. Along with her husband, she played a key role in the 13-year struggle to restore the institute to its members after it was taken over by General Zia ul Haq in 1980. The institute was restored to its independent status by the Supreme Court of Pakistan in 1993.

== Publications ==
She is Editor-in-Chief of Pakistan Horizon, the quarterly journal of The Pakistan Institute of International Affairs, and editor of Pakistan in a Changing World, which was favorably reviewed by International Affairs. She is also the author of articles on international relations and management issues, and she edited The Pakistan Journal of Public Administration for many years. Her book, Pakistan in an Age of Turbulence, was published by Pen and Sword History, UK, in 2022.

== Awards ==
- Woman of the Year Award, December 1994.
- Goodwill Ambassador of the World NGO Day Initiative (2014) which is an international day on the calendar dedicated to all NGOs working worldwide and the people behind them in recognition of her leadership and experience as Chairperson of The Pakistan Institute of International Affairs and her commitment to the cause of women's empowerment as president of the Board of Governors of Aurat Foundation.
- Lifetime Achievement Award from the Sindh Commission on the Status of Women in 2019.
