= 1972 Karachi labour unrest =

In 1972, Pakistan's largest city, Karachi, witnessed major labour unrest in its industrial areas of S.I.T.E Industrial Area and Korangi-Landhi. Several protesting workers were killed or injured by police during this period. In a number of cases, workers briefly occupied their factories.

== Background ==
=== 1958–1968: Ayub Khan’s military rule and labor repression ===
Under Ayub Khan's military rule, the industrial sector thrived, while the working class suffered significantly. Labor activists were frequently arrested, tried in military courts, and trade unions were restricted. Such an environment led to mounting frustration among workers and students, culminating in the 1968 movement, which ultimately ousted Ayub Khan and led to Yahya Khan’s succession.

=== 1969–1971: Yahya Khan's tenure and labor retrenchment ===
Yahya Khan's military regime continued to repress labor movements, imposing strict controls to prevent strikes and lockouts. During his tenure, approximately 45,000 workers in Karachi were retrenched. This period saw increasing militancy among labor groups, setting the stage for further unrest under the new civilian government.

=== 1971–1972: Rise of the Pakistan People's Party and labor unrest ===
When the Pakistan People's Party (PPP) came to power under Zulfikar Ali Bhutto on December 20, 1971, workers initially felt hopeful due to Bhutto's anti-industrialist and socialist agenda.

Early 1972 saw a surge in labor activism, with notable incidents such as the occupation of Dawood Mills in Karachi, led by Aziz-ul-Hasan and Riaz Ahmed. Between January and May, approximately 150 factories were encircled, with industrialists appealing to the president for intervention. However, the response from the state was harsh, and several workers were killed, imprisoned, or allegedly assaulted during police interrogations.

== Labor unrest ==
=== 1972: Protests ===
The Karachi labor unrest began on June 6, 1972, with a protest at Feroz Sultan Mills in S.I.T.E. Town. Workers demanded wages and their share of the workers' participatory fund. On June 7, the state responded by ordering police to fire on peaceful protesters, resulting in the deaths of three workers, including Shoaib Khan, a leading figure in the Muttahida Mazdoor Federation.

The next day, a procession formed for Khan's funeral; it soon escalated into a mass protest. Police then opened fire again, killing 10 workers and injuring dozens more. This sparked a large-scale strike, closing over 900 industrial units and paralyzing Karachi's industrial zones. The strike ended on June 18 after a tribunal was established, but brutal repression still followed with around 1,200 workers arrested.

Labor unrest continued in Landhi Town where striking workers occupied mills and refused to return to work. On October 18, police and military forces bulldozed factory walls to suppress the protests, resulting in the deaths of around 100 workers. Dawn reported that the conflict began over wage demands in a government-run machine tool factory which then spread to nearby textile mills. Paramilitary forces ultimately quashed the protests by force.

Trade unionist Karamat Ali later explained that these protests erupted because workers, inspired by Bhutto's campaign promises, expected more comprehensive reforms than the labor policy announced in February 1972. When the policy fell short, workers mobilized in large numbers, prompting Bhutto to respond with force.

=== 1973–1977: Aftermath and continued repression ===
Over the following years, Bhutto's government continued to crack down on labor movements nationwide. Prominent labor leaders, such as Bawar Khan, Tufail Abbas, and Meraj Muhammad Khan, faced imprisonment, torture, and harassment. In October 1974, Bhutto further restricted trade unions through a presidential ordinance, earning praise from the industrial sector for its effectiveness in curbing labor activities.

By 1975, labor movements slowed down as unions became entangled in numerous legal battles.

In 1977, Bhutto's regime was overthrown by Muhammad Zia-ul-Haq, marking an even darker period for labor rights as Zia intensified the repression of trade unions.

== Legacy ==
To honor the workers killed during the 1972 protests, Benaras Chowk was renamed Shaheed Chowk (Martyr's Square) and later Bacha Khan Chowk.

A Shaheed Mazdoor Yadgari Committee was established to hold public meetings commemorating fallen workers. Additionally, a memorial monument with the words "Mazdoor Shaheed" was erected at the S.I.T.E. graveyard.
