= Students Solidarity March =

- Date: November 30, 2018; November 29, 2019; November 27, 2020
- Location: 53 cities of Pakistan.
- Caused by: Ban on student unions, rise in academic costs, sexual harassment
- Goals: Restoration of student unions, reduction of fees, higher-quality investigations into sexual harassment
- Methods: Protest march

Students Solidarity March is a series of rallies in support of demands of students taking place in Pakistan from 2018 to 2020. The first rally was held on November 30, 2018, in ten cities of Pakistan. The second rally took place on November 29, 2019, in 53 cities of Pakistan. This march was supported by the Students Action Committee which was joined by various progressive organizations. The main demands were to increase the education budget, elections of student unions, and democratic rights for students. Participants also strongly condemned occupation of their hostels by paramilitary forces and poor investigation of sexual harassment cases. On November 19, 2020, a student from the South Waziristan district submitted an application in the Supreme Court of Pakistan for reconsideration of its 1992 judgement, requesting for a reconsideration of a ban on student politics and student unions.

== Background ==
The National Students Federation's 'October Movement' in Karachi gained nationwide support and aimed to end feudalism and establish a truly independent state. The movement faced censorship and opposition from the ruling elite, leading to political maneuvers and suppression tactics. Despite challenges, they won victories in student union elections. The ruling classes, fearing a revolution, imposed a ban on student unions on February 9, 1984, sparking a nationwide crackdown on activists of the National Students Federation.

According to Iqbal Haider Butt's book Revisiting Student Politics in Pakistan, 1983's student union elections in [[Karachi]] had progressive and anti-dictatorship alliances sweep the polls. Sindh's provincial Governor Lieutenant-General SM Abbasi warned Zia-ul-Haq that due to student unions, universities and colleges could once again become breeding grounds of anti-government agitation. After him, student politics were allowed for a short time until they were banned again by the Supreme Court of Pakistan in 1993. Many student organisations started to slowly decline but right-wing organizations like Islami Jamiat-e-Talba (IJT) and Muslim Students Federation continued to operate in a few universities.

A March 2018 rally organizer put out the following words as a reason for the march:

We are marching on November 29 to organise and to seek institutional power in universities and create a way of holding onto that power. It’s our education — we should control it.

== Students Solidarity March of November 2018 ==
Student Solidarity March in 2018 were held in more than 50 cities of Pakistan which was joined by thousands of students, academics, politicians, and activists. Various public figures joined and expressed their solidarity with students. The Charter of Demands presented by students in the march included restoring student unions, student representation in decision-making on campuses, sexual harassment policies on campuses, freezing fee hikes, increasing budgetary allowance for education to 5% of the country's GDP, and improving the quality of research and teaching.

== Students Solidarity March of November 2019 ==
The Students' Solidarity March of November 2019 insists that the government must ensure the following:

- Lift the ban and hold elections for student unions
- Abandon privatisation of educational institutes, and reverse a recent decision of school and college fee hike
- Free education for all
- No more budget cuts for the Higher Education Commission, or sacking of educational staff
- At least five per cent of the GDP should be allocated for education
- Abolish the semester system
- Lift a ban on students from participating in political activities
- End the intervention (in the name of national security) of security forces in educational institutions, and release all students held captive
- Establish committees to investigate incidents of sexual harassment, and ensure women are made a part of the set-up
- All universities should have a library, hostel, and provide transport and an internet connection
- Modernise education systems
- Set up schools and colleges in less-developed areas, and increase the quota of students coming from outside main cities
- Establish research centres for a transition from fossil fuel energy to renewable energy in public sector universities
- Announce April 13 as a national holiday to honour Mashal Khan

Hamza Tariq Chaudhry, President of the Pakistan Development Society at the London School of Economics, and others also expressed solidarity with the movement and wrote an open letter to Government of Pakistan urging fulfillment of the demands of the students.

=== Aftermath ===
The Sindh province announced a lifted ban on student unions in the province. The Lahore police force registered cases against various organizers and participants.

== Students Solidarity March of November 2020 ==
In Islamabad, a march was organized "Students Union Restoration March" on November 27, 2020. On 27th of November, despite fears of COVID-19, students from different cities of Pakistan marched as part of this movement. Masks were distributed among attendees to curb the spread of COVID-19. Demands of students varied from decreases of fees to the improvement of online education systems during COVID-19. Lifting ban on student unions, as always, was the main focal point of the march. Another focus of the rallies was the Pakistan Medical Commission allegedly attempting to conduct the Medical & Dental College Admission Test legally.

Following the march, a supporting member of the marches was declared a "threat to public safety" and detained by Lahore police. He challenged it in the Lahore High Court and a hearing followed a few days later. During this hearing, he claimed that he had received threatening calls.

== Students Solidarity March of November 2021 ==
The Student Solidarity March of November 2021 was held on November 26, 2021, across various cities in Pakistan.

== See also ==
- Progressive Students Federation
- Progressive Students Collective
