= Sassui Palijo =

Pakistani politician and columnist

- سسئي پليجو
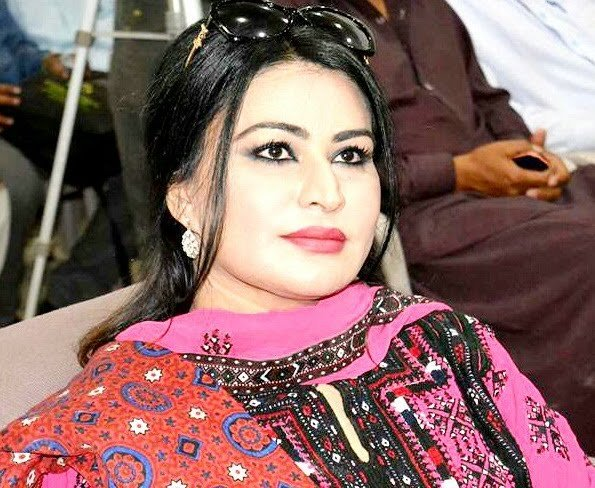
- Preceded by: Ghulam Qadir Palijo
- Constituency: PS-85 (Thatta-II)

Member, Provincial Assembly of Sindh
- In office 2008–2013
- Succeeded by: Amir Haider Shah Sheerazi
- Constituency: PS-85 (Thatta-II)

Personal details
- Born: 10 January 1976 (age 50) Jungshahi, Sindh, Pakistan
- Party: Pakistan People's Party
- Spouse: Suhail Kalhoro
- Relations: Rasul Bux Palejo (uncle)
- Parent(s): Ghulam Qadir Palijo (father); Zarina Akhtar Baloch (mother)
- Education: University of Sindh
- Occupation: Politician

Sassui Palijo (Sindhi: سسئي پليجو) is a politician and a columnist from Thatta, Sindh, Pakistan. Palijo is currently affiliated to Pakistan Peoples Party, served as a Senator on women's reserved seat from Sindh from 2015 to 2021. She is also a two-time Member of the Sindh Provincial Assembly from PS-85 (Thatta-II).

== Early life and education ==
She was born on 10 January 1976 into a Sindhi Muslim family, in Jungshahi, Thatta. She is a double graduate, with an undergraduate degree in law from London and an MA in political science from University of Sindh (1989).

== Political career ==
She was first elected Member of the Provincial Assembly of Sindh from Mirpur Sakro area of constituency PS-85 (Thatta-II) in 2002 and later in 2008, when she was the only directly elected female assembly member in Sindh out of 168 assembly members. She served as the Minister for Culture in the Sindh cabinet led by chief minister Syed Qaim Ali Shah from 2008 to 2013. Her efforts led to the shifting of the archaeology department from Islamabad to Sindh. Around 300 books on Sindh's culture, history, and language were published during her tenure.

She lost her seat in the 2013 Pakistani general election by a margin of only 409 votes, after which she became a senator on a reserved seat from Sindh from 2015 to 2021. Palijo was elected Chairperson of Senate Standing Committee on Parliamentary Affairs in 2018.

== Activism ==
Palijo has been an active campaigner for human rights and gender equality. During General Musharraf's rule, she was arrested many times in Islamabad, Thatta, Karachi, Lahore, and Thar for protesting against the military regime. In 2009, she strongly protested Musharraf's handing over of Hindu Gymkhana to the National Academy of Performing Arts, saying that Hindu Gymkhana would be reserved for activities of the Hindu community.

== Personal life ==
Palijo's father, Ghulam Qadir Palijo, has been a Member of the Sindh Provincial Assembly from Thatta twice – in 1993 and 1997 – and is a former chairman of Thatta district council. Her mother, Akhtar Baloch, was the first Pakistani woman politician to be arrested during Ayub Khan's military rule. Her aunt, Zarina Baloch, was a writer, actress, folk singer, teacher, and political activist. Her uncle, Rasul Bux Palejo, was the founder of Awami Tahreek.
