= Liberal Students Federation =

Student federation in Pakistan

Liberal Students Federation (LSF) is a student federation in Pakistan created by a split from the National Students Federation in 1973. It has branches in all major Colleges and Universities in Pakistan.

It played a significant part in student developments recently along with the NSF to both strengthen and orient towards social Democratic positions of the newly formed Insaaf Student Federation (ISF) which is now aligned with the PTI and is fighting against the overthrow of General Mashraaf's military junta and vocal support with the pro-lawyers movement to restore the independent judiciary.

== See also ==
- List of student federations of Pakistan
