= Progressive Students Federation =

Student political organisation in Pakistan

- Abbreviation: PrSF
- Formation: 2014
- Type: Left-wing students’ organization
- Purpose: Struggle for the democratic rights of students, for restoration of students’ unions
- Location: Pakistan

Progressive Students Federation (PrSF) is a left-wing socialist students’ organisation based in Pakistan. PrSF was formed in 2014 in Khyber-Pakhtunkhwa but was later joined various factions of National Students Federation in Punjab and Sindh. The organisation has mobilised students and youth all over Pakistan for democratisation of campuses, restoration of student unions and universal education.

== Formation ==
History

Progressive Students Federation (PrSF) was founded on December 21, 2014, in Buner, Khyber Pakhtunkhwa by left-wing socialist political leader Fanoos Gujjar. In 2015, PrSF Swat unit was established. In 2016, PrSF was started in Hyderabad, Sindh, after that PrSF units were formed in different cities of Sindh. In Islamabad, PrSF was started in 2017. In Punjab and Sindh, PrSF is a continuation of Punjab and Sindh chapters of National Students’ Federation (NSF), which were reappeared in late 2000s. NSF was initially formed in 1956 after the Democratic Students Federation (DSF) was banned in 1954. NSF played a major role in the popular student and labour uprising against the dictatorship in 1967 and 1968. Ever since student unions were banned in 1984, students have been facing ever-increasing problems.

PrSF exists in the form of basic, district and provincial units. The first convention of the Islamabad-Rawalpindi unit was held in October 2021, and the second district congress was held on October 15, 2023. First National (provincial) Congress of Sindh was held on March 6, 2022.

== Ideology ==
PrSF aims to raise political and social awareness among students about their democratic rights, to work towards restoring student unions, to organize students in educational within institutions and outside, and to create a strong and organized students’ movement that will lay the foundation for an affordable, uniform, democratic, secular, modern and scientific education system.

== Activities ==
The activities organised by PrSF include weekly study circles, on topics of students' rights, revival of banned students' unions in education campuses, budget cuts of education. PrSF campaigned against anti-student policies, pushed a bill on students' unions' restoration in Senate, and organized annual student marches in 2018, 2019, 2020 2021 and 2022. Street theatres on students rights were also performed during these students' marches.

PrSF jointly organized and participated in events with other allies against religious extremism such as Songs of freedom, 2018 Mashal March, 2019 in addition to annual Women's rights' marches, climate march, flood relief, climate justice, students’ housing rights march. During the pandemic, PrSF protested against the lack of internet facilities for online education for students in peripheral areas of country, and the limited access to education for women, as well as unsafe environment for women at campuses.

While demanding for students' rights, PrSF members had to face censorship from rightwing groups, and even through arrests. PrSF also organised protests for the laborers’ rights, forced displacement, inflation and price hike, trans rights, anti-imperialism etc. PrSF formed the alliances with other progressive groups such as Students Action Committee, Hyderabad Students Alliance Leftwing groups' alliance and United Democratic Front (UDF) etc.
