= Sohail Sangi =

Pakistani journalist and activist

- Born: 1953 (age 72–73) village Janjhi of Tharparkar district
- Education: University of Sindh
- Occupations: Journalist; Writer
- Years active: 1970 to Present
- Employer: Dawn
- Known for: Pioneer of 'resistance journalism' in Sindh
- Children: Riaz Sohail

Sohail Sangi (Sindhi: سهيل سانگي) is a senior journalist and activist of the leftist movement in Pakistan, presently working with the daily newspaper Dawn. He has been on the visiting faculty of the Mass Communication Department at the University of Sindh. Currently, he is on the visiting faculty of the Department of Mass Communication (Abdul Haq Campus Karachi) at the Federal Urdu University.

== Early life ==
Sohail Sangi was born in village Janjhi of Tharparkar district, Pakistan in 1953. He did his M.A. in English from University of Sindh Jamshoro in the 1970s. He was an activist of the left-wing students organisation Sindh National Students Federation during his student life.

== Career ==
Sohail Sangi joined journalism in the mid-1970s. He was one of the pioneers of Daily Sindh News which was published under the editorship of Sindhi nationalist leader Shaikh Aziz in 1975 and later, also worked with Daily Ibrat, Daily Safeer, Daily Awami Awaz, and Daily Kawish.

Sohail Sangi also worked with Weekly Bedari and 'Weekly Sachai' with Ali Hassan. He was founder of Daily Awami Awaz the first computerised newspaper of Sindhi language and Weekly Arsee. Sangi also wrote and translated six books on different topics.

Sohail Sangi has a reputation for being a pioneer of 'resistance journalism' in Sindh.

Sohail Sangi was arrested in July 1980 and he along with Jam Saqi, Nazeer Abbasi, Professor Jamal Naqvi, Badar Abro, Kamal Warsi and Shabbir Shar were tried by a Special Military Court in 1982-83 for bringing socialist revolution in Pakistan. He was declared Prisoner of Conscience by Amnesty International in 1984. Later he was released in 1985. After his release, he joined Daily Aftab Hyderabad, Sindh, Pakistan.

Sohail Sangi has helped introduce progressive activists in Sindhi media besides his other contributions in journalism.

He has been a freelance contributor of BBC Urdu.
