= Hajiani Lanjo =

Pakistani liberal political and social activist

Hajiani Lanjo (in Sindhi) حاجياڻي لنجو
- Constituency: NA-229

Personal details
- Born: Hajiani; 5 April 1982 (age 44) Tharparkar, Sindh, Pakistan
- Party: Awami Tehreek
- Education: University of Sindh
- Occupation: Advocate

Hajiani Lanjo (Sindhi: حاجياڻي لنجو) is a liberal political and social activist from Tharparkar, a remote and underdeveloped desert area of Sindh, Pakistan. She belongs to the Awami Tehreek party and Sindhiani Tahreek. She reached prominence after challenged Arbab Ghulam Rahim, a powerful tribal leader from Tharparkar, in the constituency of NA-229 in election-2013.

An attorney by profession, Hajiani became a symbol of social change and a voice of women in Tharparkar area. Prior to her political career, Lanjo had served in various social organisations around Tharparkar. She was also a compere for Radio Pakistan at Mithi.

== Family & Education ==
Lanjo belongs to a landless peasant family from the Village in vicinity of Mithi, she was the first female in her family to obtain education up to a college. Hajiani Lanjo was born in small village of Alamsir in Mithi. Her father Mubarak Lanjo was a poor farmer. She attended a government primary school at Rokdyar. She overcame social and economic problems to continue her studies. She graduated while meeting her family's home expenditures by teaching at a private school run by a non-governmental organization. She then worked at different non-governmental organizations of Thar, including Thardeep, Banh-Beli, Sukaar Foundation and Marvi Rural Development organisation.

She graduated with a Masters in Sociology from University of Sindh and further pursued her career in Law.

== Political career ==
Hajiani Lanjo marching during Mohabbat-e-Sindh train march against SPLGO in Islamabad.

During her study of law at Hyderabad, Sindh she developed associations with members of Sindhiani Tahreek, a sister organisation of Qaumi Awami Tehreek struggling to empowering women and thus entered politics. She founded the district chapter of Sindhiani Tahreek in Tharparker and became its president. She participated in general elections from Tharparkar.
