= Progressive Students Collective =

Progressive Students' Collective
- Progressive Students Collective
- Abbreviation: PSC
- Formation: December 2016
- Type: independent Left-wing students’ organization
- Legal status: Active
- Purpose: To educate & organize students around critical issues and to build revolutionary consiousness
- Headquarters: Lahore
- Location: Pakistan
- Members: Classified
- Central President: Ali Abdullah Khan
- Secretary General: Eqbal Khan
- Main organ: Central Cabinet
- Publication: The Student Herald
- Affiliations: JAC Left wing Student Alliance
- Website: https://thestudentsherald.com/

The Progressive Students' Collective (PSC) is an independent left-wing student organization based in Pakistan. Formed in 2016, PSC led the revival of leftist student politics in the country after decades of decline due to the banning of student unions. Its primary support base consists of students from various universities across Pakistan.

Although a leftist student organization, PSC follows a Marxist political line, advocating for an end to class-based exploitation, gender inequality, and the oppression of ethnic and religious minorities, while putting up radical resistance against the status quo in the country.

PSC has regularly organized Student Solidarity Marches each year and played a highly active and influential role in Palestine solidarity protests and marches across Pakistan last year in response to the genocide committed by Israel in Gaza. This included calling out the German ambassador at the Asma Jahangir Conference and organizing a protest in front of the US Embassy in Lahore.

== Formation ==
Progressive Students Collective (PSC) was formed in 2016. Initially students of Government College formed Hegelian Study group to discuss various philosophers and their writings. But the killing of Mashal Khan, student of Abdul Wali Khan University, Mardan on the fake accusation of blasphemy by fellow students prompted the group to form a political organization to protect student right in the country.

== Early Years(2017-2018) ==
PSC started organizing in Government College University and Punjab University Lahore in 2017. It focused on the issue of fees hike, harassment on campus and discriminatory policies of university administration against students from peripheries initially and started getting popularity amin students.

== Palestine Solidarity Movement ==
PSC began organizing solidarity protests on various campuses across Lahore soon after the Israeli assault on Gaza began. Initially, the protests had a small number of participants, but the breakthrough moment came when PSC announced a protest in front of the US Embassy in Lahore—a call that had not been made by any other organization before. Right before the protest, the Asma Jahangir Conference was held on April 27–28 to celebrate Asma Jahangir, a fierce human rights defender, and to discuss the state of human rights in Pakistan and globally. The conference invited the British and German ambassadors to speak on human rights in Pakistan.

PSC activists attended the conference and called out the German ambassador for his hypocrisy—delivering a lecture on human rights in Pakistan while his country supplies arms to Israel for carrying out genocide and initiates a brutal crackdown against pro-Palestine protesters in Germany. In response, the German ambassador used the phrase "Get out," which offended the Pakistani public, as it echoed the colonial attitude of the viceroy during British rule. This incident brought global prominence to PSC, with media outlets such as The Guardian, BBC, and Al Jazeera covering the story. In the aftermath, PSC launched a nationwide movement under the banner of the Palestinian Solidarity Committee, which sparked successful student-led protests across the country—including a landmark demonstration in front of the US Embassy.

== Sub Organization ==
There are six sub organizations of PSC.

1. The Students’ Herald (Publication/Magazine)
2. The Artists’ Assembly

== Membership ==
In order to become a member of PSC, one must be in any educational institute i.e. must be a student, must not be part of any other political organization. PSC categorizes its members into "Sympathizers" and "Active Members".

== Organization City Chapter ==
Progressive Students Collective (PSC) has presence in most major city like Lahore, Karachi, Hyderabad, Islamabad, Peshawar etc.

== University/College Campus Unit ==
Progressive Students Collective (PSC) has presence in most major universities like Punjab University, Karachi University, Federal Urdu University, Sindh University, Government College University lahore, BZU University etc.

== Students Solidarity March ==
PSC always organized annually march in big city of country for restoration of student union in last week of November called Student Solidarity March. PSC has organized many events highlighting rights of workers, students, youth, and general public like Faiz Aman Mela, 2018, Shehri Tahafuzz March, 2019 against Sahiwal killings, Labour Relief Campaign, protests against anti-people budget, extremism and violence at campuses, human rights violation, forceful abductions, and mob lynching theatre, Climate Justice March, Students Solidarity March in 2018, 2019, 2020 2021 and 2022.

== Student action committee ==
PSC played important role in making student alliance in the form of student action committee in 2019. In 2019, PSC members including Arooj Aurangzaib, Virsa Pirzado and Zubair, Ali Raza, Qaisar Javed faced huge criticism and faces criminals charges through fake FIR on raising slogans for Students Solidariy March. Members of PSC, also faced arrests in 2021 during the pandemic while protesting for online examination in Lahore. On February 9, 2022, PSC organised a series of protests in several cities to mark the 38th year of ban on student unions in Pakistan in 1984 by dictator Zia-ul-Haq. In Lahore, PSC also staged a sit-in outside Punjab Assembly. PSC also faced pressure from campus authorities against organizing study circles and participation in women rights' marches.
