= Naseem Thebo =

Pakistani writer (1948–2012)

- نسيم ٿيٻو
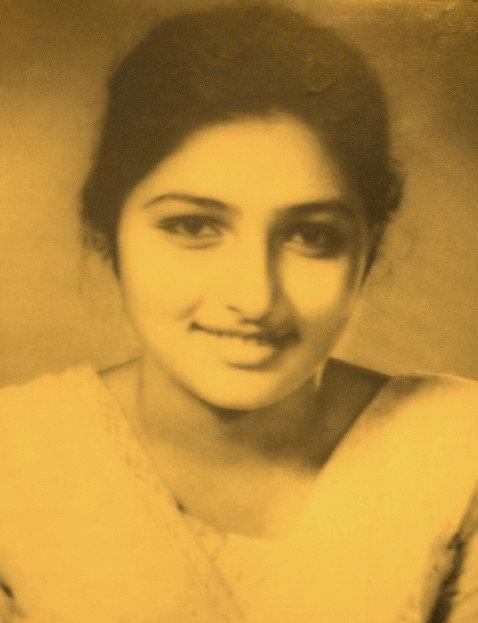
- Born: 1 April 1948; Shikarpur, Sindh, Pakistan
- Died: 19 March 2012 (aged 63); Karachi, Sindh, Pakistan
- Education: University of Sindh, Jamshoro, Pakistan.
- Occupation: Writer • teacher
- Spouse: Rasool Bux Palijo
- Writing career
- Subjects: Economics, Sindhi literature
- Notable works: Ubhur Chand Pas Piren (اُڀر چنڊ پس پرين), 2013

Naseem Thebo (Sindhi: نسيم ٿيٻو; April 1, 1948 – March 19, 2012) was a Sindhi language teacher and short story writer from Pakistan. She served as an associate professor in the Department of Economics at the University of Sindh. She was the wife of Sindhi politician Rasool Bux Palijo.

== Early life and education ==
Naseem Thebo was born on 1 April 1940 in Shikarpur and received her early education from Garhi (Sindhi: ڳاڙهي), a village in Dadu District. She earned an MA in Economics from the University of Sindh, Jamshoro. Her father's name was Mir Abdul Baqui Thebo. Her mother, Badam Natawan, was Pakistan's first Sindhi female novelist. Her sister, Benazir Thebo, was also a writer, and her brother, Mir Thebo, is a political activist and communist leader.

== Contributions as a writer ==
She inherited the art of writing from her mother, Badam Natawan. She wrote her first Sindhi short story, 'Ghoran Ji Rekha,' (Sindhi: ڳوڙهن جي ريکا ; English: 'line of teardrops') when she was studying in tenth standard. Some of her other story titles include 'Ghayal The Ghariyan' (Sindhi: گهايل ٿي گهاريان ; English: 'living being injured), 'Wadhay Jin Widhiyas' (Sindhi: وڍي جن وڌياس ; English: 'Those who wounded'), 'Mon Jherenday chhadia' (Sindhi: مون جهيڙيندي ڇڏيا ; English: 'I left them fighting') This story was written on the subject of the separation of East Pakistan from West Pakistan. Another story titled 'Ubhur Chand Pas Piren' (Sindhi: اڀر چنڊ پس پرين ; English: 'O Moon rise and behold my beloved'), 'Rasando Bharjando Ghaav' (Sindhi: رسندو ڀرجندو گهاءُ ; ; English: 'Lacerating Healing Wound') and 'Ahsas Ja Chak' (Sindhi: احساس جا چڪ) among others.

Most of the titles of her short stories are inspired by the verses of the great Sindhi Sufi Poet, Shah Abdul Latif Bhittai. All these stories were published in different popular journals of Sindhi literature at that time, such as 'Sojhro,' 'Barsat,' 'Halchal,' 'Mehran,' etc. She wrote around 25 stories.

Many of her stories are set in the backdrop of village life, which she had a chance to witness up-close. The misery of womenfolk and the plight of farmers at the hands of landlords and the thanna culture were some of the glimpses of the ugly side of village life that found a place in her stories.

Her story collection titled Ubhur Chand Pas Piren (in Sindhi) was published by Sindhi Adabi Board in 2013. In this book, 15 of her stories have been compiled by Din Muhammad Kalhoro.

== Personal life ==
Naseem Thebo was married to politician Rasool Bux Palijo. She had two daughters, Tania Palijo (also known as Tania Saleem) and Anita Aijaz. She was the mother-in-law of columnist Aijaz Mangi.

== Death ==
She died on 19th March 2012 in Karachi.
