= Tufail Abbas =

Pakistani trade unionist and politician (c.1928–2019)

Tufail Abbas (c. 1928 – 8 September 2019) was a Pakistani trade unionist and communist politician. He was a veteran labour leader in the airline industry, heading the Airways Employees Union. In later years he served as chairman of the Pakistan Mazdoor Mahaz ('Pakistan Workers Front') and chief editor of the Urdu monthly Awami Manshoor.

== Airline industry union leader ==
Abbas was a union leader at Pakistan International Airlines (PIA) during four decades. He had become an employee at Orient Airways in late 1948, and took part in the strike of March 1949. When PIA acquired Orient Airways, Abbas became a PIA employee. At the time PIA management and union leaders were in close contact, the PIA Managing-Director Malik Nur Khan sent Abbas to India to study labour practices at Air India. Abbas was jailed on different occasions due to his labour activism.

== In the Communist Party ==
Abbas was recruited to the Communist Party of Pakistan in the early 1950s by Ahmed Aziz (who was later accused of having worked as a government infiltrator). At the time Abbas was working in the airline industry. By the late 1950s Abbas held the post of secretary of the Karachi Committee of the Communist Party. The Karachi Committee was hierarchically placed under the Hyderabad-based Sindh Provincial Committee, but under Abbas' leadership the Karachi Committee became increasingly independent. Apart from his base in the PIA union, Abbas also counted on support within the National Students Federation and some labour groups in the city.

== Sino-Soviet split ==
In 1966 the Sindh Provincial Committee was split in pro-Soviet and pro-China parties, a split taking place in the aftermath of the 1965 Indo-Pakistan war. Abbas emerged as the general secretary of the underground, pro-Beijing Communist Party. His group won the support of the majority in the National Students Federation. Abbas was invited to the October 1 celebrations in China in 1966.

After the 1966 split Abbas' faction began seeking to build an organization across West Pakistan. It also had some contacts in East Pakistan. Abbas' labour wing was known as the Quami Mazdoor Mahaz ('National Labour Front'), which emerged from the Markezi Mazdoor Committee in 1969. The Airways Employees Union was the strongest union inside the Quami Mazdoor Mahaz.

== Alliance with Bhutto ==
Tacitly, the Abbas faction provided support to Zulfikar Ali Bhutto. In the late 1960s, some members of the Abbas' faction joined Bhutto's Pakistan People's Party on the instruction of the party and began occupying positions in the PPP. Abbas' support base amongst students and workers played an important role in building the PPP in Karachi at its earliest phase. One of the key leaders of Abbas' faction that became a PPP leader was Meraj Muhammad Khan. Nevertheless, Abbas' group opted not to participate in the 1970 elections.

In the context of the Bangladesh Liberation War, Abbas' faction opposed military action in East Pakistan at some points whilst maintaining a critical view of Sheikh Mujibur Rahman's Awami League.

Details of Tufail Abbas's alliance with Bhutto and his political career is given in the Urdu book named "Under Ground" by Ashraf Shad.

== Sino-Albanian split ==
Abbas sided with Albania in the Sino-Albanian split.

== Later years ==
Abbas' autobiography Subah ki lagan ('Yearning for Dawn') was published in 2010.

Abbas died in Karachi on September 8, 2019.
