= Fatehyab Ali Khan =

Pakistani political and social activist (1936-2010)

- فتح یاب علی خان
- Fatehyab Ali Khan
- Born: 1936; Hyderabad, (Hyderabad Deccan), British India
- Died: 26 September 2010 (aged 73–74); Karachi, Pakistan
- Occupations: Political activist; Social activist; Lawyer
- Years active: 1962 – 2010
- Known for: Political activist who stood up for his principles
- Notable work: Pakistan Institute of International Affairs (Chairperson); Mazdoor Kisan Party (President); Students Union of Karachi University (President); Movement for the Restoration of Democracy (Member)
- Spouse: Masuma Hasan
- Children: 2

Fatehyab Ali Khan (1936 – 26 September 2010) was a Pakistani social and political activist and lawyer, who served as chairperson of the Pakistan Institute of International Affairs, president of Mazdoor Kisan Party, and the first-ever president of students union of Karachi University in 1962.

During his political activism, he criticised military dictatorship in Pakistan and was detained later displaced by the military dictator general and later field marshal Ayub Khan for taking part in political movements.

== Early life ==
Fatehyab was born in 1936 in Hyderabad (Hyderabad Deccan) of British India. He migrated from Bombay (now Mumbai) to Pakistan in 1949 and settled in Karachi. He was fourteen when he entered the newly-independent Pakistan. He then served as President of the University of Karachi students union in 1962.

It is claimed he played a significant role in reducing of degree course duration from three years to two, leading students earn their degrees with a minimum time span of two years which was originally set for three years. In the 1960s, University of Karachi was a major center of student politics with Fatehyab Ali Khan and Meraj Muhammad Khan being the student leaders. Before that, Adeebul Hasan Rizvi and his supporters were also active in leftist politics at Dow Medical College, Karachi. After completing his education, Fatehyab Ali Khan worked as a lawyer.

== Political activities ==
In 1964 general elections, he took part in election campaign of Fatima Jinnah and supported her against military dictator General Ayub Khan who later detained him for his role in the elections. He was actively involved in Pakistan's democracy restoration movement, leading him to act against the will of general Muhammad Zia-ul-Haq. He was jailed by the government for his contribution to the political movements and was displaced by the administration.

He was also displaced from Sindh by the military government of the country for taking part in a movement against Ayub’s coup d'état.

Fatehyab Ali Khan was also elected as the President of Mazdoor Kisan Party in Pakistan in 1989.

== Death ==
Fatahyab Ali Khan was suffering from many health issues and chronic conditions. He was subsequently admitted to the Aga Khan University Hospital, Karachi for medical treatment after suffering a cardiac arrest on 23 September 2010, and later died on 26 September 2010. Among the survivors was his wife, Masuma Hasan and their two sons. Masooma Hasan later became Pakistan's ambassador to Austria.
