= 1984 Pakistani Islamisation programme referendum =

- 19 December 1984
- "Whether the people of Pakistan endorse the process initiated by General Muhammad Zia-ul-Haq, the President of Pakistan, for bringing the laws of Pakistan in conformity with the injunctions of Islam as laid down in the Holy Quran and Sunnah of the Holy Prophet (PBUH) and for the preservation of the Islamic ideology of Pakistan, for the continuation and consolidation of that process, and for the smooth and orderly transfer of power to the elected representatives of the people."

Results
Choice	Votes	%
Yes	21,253,757	98.53%
No	316,918	1.47%
Valid votes	21,570,675	99.17%
Invalid or blank votes	180,226	0.83%
Total votes	21,750,901	100.00%
Registered voters/turnout	34,992,425	62.16%

A referendum on the Islamisation policy of President Muhammad Zia-ul-Haq was held in Pakistan on 19 December 1984. Voters were asked whether they supported Zia-ul-Haq's proposals for amending several laws in accordance with the Quran and Sunnah, whether they wanted this process to continue, and whether they supported the Islamist ideology of Pakistan. The referendum also served as way of extending Zia-ul-Haq's presidential term by five years. Zia-ul-Haq had been president since 1978, after taking power in a coup in 1977.

While the Pakistani constitution required that the president be elected by national and provincial assemblies, Zia-ul-Haq justified the referendum's alteration to this process with reference to regional instability caused by the ongoing Soviet intervention in Afghanistan and the recent assassination of Indian prime minister Indira Gandhi. He stated that in addition to helping keep Pakistan stable, the principal purpose of the referendum was "establishing Islamic democracy". Western diplomats characterised the referendum as a way to mitigate American-based criticism of the military dictatorship.

Opposition figures criticised the announcement. Shah Faridul Haq of the Islamist Jamiat Ulema-e-Pakistan party described the referendum plan as "clear fraud", saying that Zia "put the question in such a way that the poor and uneducated voters will be fooled." The Movement for the Restoration of Democracy and the Karachi Bar Association called for the public to boycott the vote. Pakistani opposition leaders predicted that Zia-al-Huq would rig the result by stuffing ballot boxes and having government supporters vote multiple times.

Official results declared it approved by 98.5% of voters, with a turnout of 62.2%. Independent observers questioned whether voter participation had reached 30% and noted that there had been "widespread irregularities". The Los Angeles Times published reports of people being turned away at polling places, having been told that they were recorded as having already voted, and the Movement for the Restoration of Democracy described the result as an "unprecedented fraud".

== Results ==
Choice	Votes	%
For	21,253,757	98.53
Against	316,918	1.47
Total	21,570,675	100.00
Valid votes	21,570,675	99.17
Invalid/blank votes	180,226	0.83
Total votes	21,750,901	100.00
Registered voters/turnout	34,992,425	62.16
Source: Nohlen et al.
