= Zarina Baloch =

Pakistani singer (1931–2005)

- Born: Zarina Baloch; 29 December 1931; Allahabad, Bombay Province, British India
- Died: 25 October 2005 (aged 74); Karachi, Sindh, Pakistan
- Occupation: Folk singer
- Spouse: Rasul Bux Palejo (married in the 1960s)
- Children: Ayaz Latif Palijo (son); Akhter Baloch (daughter) (from her first husband)

Zarina Baloch (Urdu: زرینہ بلوچ) (29 December 1931 – 25 October 2005) was a Sindhi folk music singer, vocalist and composer from the Sindh province of Pakistan. She was also an actress, Radio and TV artist, writer, teacher for over 30 years, political activist and social worker. She is notable for her revolutionary songs and resistance against the military dictatorship of General Zia-ul-Haq.

== Early life and family ==
She was born on 29 December 1931 in Allahdad Chand village, Hyderabad, Sindh, Pakistan. Her mother, Gulroz Jalalani, died in 1940 when Zarina was six years old. She studied with Mohammad Juman, who was also a Sindhi singer. At the early age of 15 years, her family arranged her marriage with a remote relative. She had two children: Akhter Baloch also known as Zina (born in 1952), and Aslam Parvez (born in 1957). However, Baloch and her husband disagreed on the subject of her further education and the pair were separated in 1958. Baloch joined Radio Hyderabad in 1960 and received her first Music Award in 1961. Then Zarina married Sindhi politician Rasool Bux Palijo in Hyderabad on 22 September 1964. They had a son, Ayaz Latif Palijo. In 1967, she became a teacher at the Model School Sindh University. She retired in 1997 and died in 2005 of brain cancer at Liaquat National Hospital.

== Imprisonment and political activism ==
In 1979, Zarina was arrested and imprisoned in Sukkur and Karachi jails for leading the protests against President General Zia-ul-Haq's martial law. Because of her struggle against the ruling classes and against gender discrimination, feudalism and martial laws of Ayub Khan and Yahya Khan, she earned the title of JeeJee (mother) of the Sindhi people. She was one of the leading founders of Sindhiani Tahreek, Women's Action Forum, Sindhi Adabi Sangat and Sindhi Haree Committee. She was fluent in Sindhi, Urdu, Seraiki, Balochi, Persian, Arabic and Gujrati.

== Filmography ==
=== Television ===
Year	Title	Role	Network
1984	Ana	Razia	PTV
1986	Jungle	Sadoori	PTV

== Awards and recognition ==
- Pride of Performance Award by the President of Pakistan in 1994
- Faiz Ahmed Faiz Award
- Pakistan Television Corporation (PTV) Award
- Lal Shahbaz Qalandar Award
- Shah Abdul Latif Bhittai Award

== Art and literary contributions ==
She wrote many songs and poetry which became popular among the nationalists in Sindh and Balochistan. She was the author of several stories and poems, and her book Tunhinjee Gola Tunhinjoon Galhion was published in 1992.

== Famous songs ==
- "Mor Tho Tilley Rana"
- "Sabhka Moomal Sabbko Raarno"
- "Tunhnjii Yaarii"
- "Sindhri tey sir ker na dendo"
- "Kaang Lanvain"
- "Guzrii Vaii Barsaat"
- "Bbii Khabar Na Aahai Par"
- "Kiin Karyaan Maan"
- "Jjariyan Bhar Jaaiyoon"
- "Saavak Rat main Saanvara"
- "Paee Yaad Aaya"
- "Gehraa Gehraa Nairn"

== See also ==
- List of Sindhi singers
- Sassui Palijo
