= Ayaz Latif Palijo =

Sindhi nationalist leader

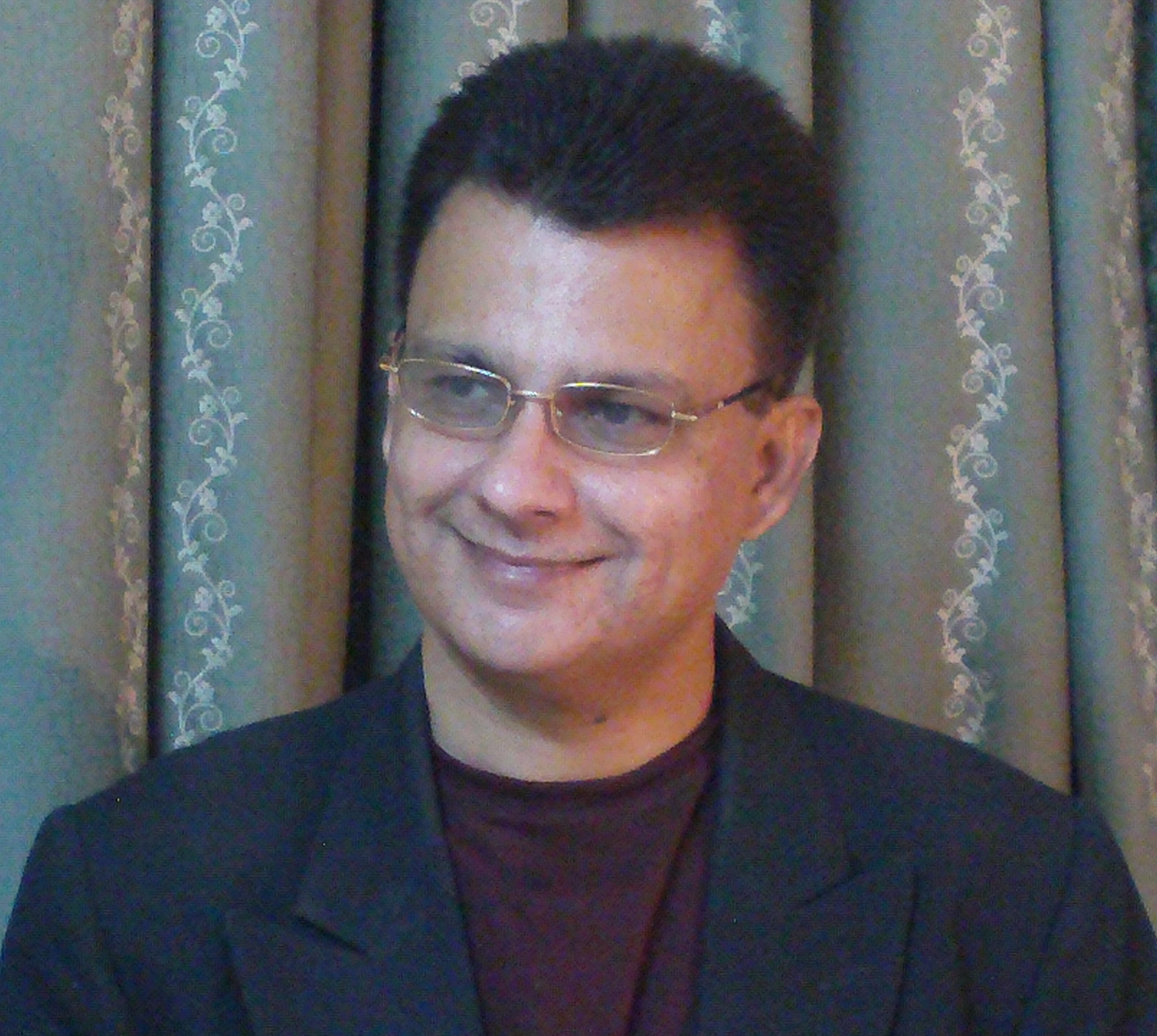
- Palejo in 2011

President of the Qaumi Awami Tahreek
- Incumbent
- Assumed office 2013
- Preceded by: Rasool Bux Palijo

Personal details
- Born: 15 November 1968 (age 57) Thatta, Sindh, Pakistan
- Party: GDA (2017-present); Qaumi Awami Tahreek
- Relations: Sassui Palijo (cousin)
- Children: 4, including Adv Sahir Ayaz; Adv Sarbaz Ayaz; Josh Ayaz; Zaarinay Ayaz
- Parent(s): Rasool Bux Palijo (father); Jiji Zarina Baloch (mother)
- Occupation: Lawyer, Politician

Ayaz Latif Palijo (Sindhi, Urdu: اياز لطیف پلیجو; born 15 November 1968) is a politician, lawyer, activist, writer and teacher from Sindh, Pakistan. Palijo is the current president of Qomi Awami Tahreek (Peoples National Movement), central convener and founder of the Sindh Progressive Nationalist Alliance (SPNA), one of the founders and central Secretary General of Grand Democratic Alliance (GDA). Since 2007, he has represented the left, objecting to the division of the southeastern Pakistani province of Sindh.

== Early life and education ==
Palijo's mother Jiji Zarina Baloch was a sindhi folk music singer and women's rights activist, founder of Sindhiani Tahreek, writer, artist and teacher. His father Rasool Bux Palijo, was a Sindhi leftist, scholar, writer and founder of Awami Tahreek.

Palijo received a LEAD (leadership for environment and development) training in the seventh cohort.

== Literary and academic contributions ==
Ayaz Latif Palijo has written several books. He is widely admired as one of the finest public speakers, scholars and human rights advocates of Pakistan. He is a distinguished interpreter of the poetry and philosophy of Shah Abdul Latif Bhittai, Faiz Ahmed Faiz, Ahmed Faraz and Shaikh Ayaz. He has addressed dozens of international conferences, seminars, universities and community forums across the United States, Canada, the United Kingdom, Norway, South Africa, Australia, Italy, Japan, the United Arab Emirates and several other countries. He is one of the most-viewed speakers among Sindhi youth across all social media platforms, inspiring millions of students to pursue education, uphold human rights, foster political awareness and build successful careers.

== Political activism ==
Palijo is the president of Qomi Awami Tahreek (QAT) of Pakistan (Peoples National Movement of Pakistan) he was central convener and founder of the Sindh Progressive Nationalist Alliance (SPANA) and is founder and central Secretary General of Grand Democratic Alliance (GDA).

=== Kalabagh Dam ===
His party manifesto is based on objectives of Social justice, peace, equality, and provincial autonomy in prospering Sindh and progressive Pakistan. Ayaz Latif Palijo and QAT are strongly against the corruption, feudalism, forced conversion, terrorism and construction of Kalabagh Dam.

=== Karachi Muhabat-e-Sindh (Love of Sindh) rally and Train March ===
In May 2012, Qomi Awami Tehrik (QAT) Party members and workers organised a Muhabat-e-Sindh (Love of Sindh) rally in Karachi against the formation of the foreign-sponsored Mohajir province. In the continuity of several Mohabbat-e-Sindh Rallies in all the districts of Sindh including Karachi, Ayaz Latif Palijo led a 03 days Mohabbat-e-Sindh Train March, which started from Karachi with the message of harmony and love for all the people of Pakistan, the march received a warm welcome at every railway station and ended with a mammoth sit-in in front of parliament house Islamabad.

=== Muhabat-e-Sindh rally attacked by terrorists ===
In 2012, women were able to attend Muhabat-e-Sindh (Love of Sindh) rally in equal numbers to men. The marchers were attacked near Nawa Lane, Pan Mandi and Juna Market. Eleven people were killed and about thirty were injured. Palijo announced to the press a peaceful strike in Sindh to highlight the incident and said his party would stage a sit-in protest till the attackers were apprehended. Ayaz Latif Palijo declared that all the permanent residents of Sindh including Urdu-speaking Sindhis are our brothers and that they should unite for the betterment of Sindh and for unity, development and peace in Pakistan.

=== Lyari rally ===
On Saturday, 14 July 2012, two months after the Muhabat-e-Sindh Rally, Palijo announced that a Shaheedan-e-Muhabbat-e-Sindh Jalsa would take place on Sunday, 15 July at Gabol Park, Lyari. In his speech, Palijo said, "Nobody can stop us from entering Lyari and other parts of Karachi." Palijo criticised the Sindh Government, saying that 4000 policemen were deployed by the Sindh government to stop his rally. After the announcement, the Sindh home minister ordered Palijo's arrest and Palijo received threats of attacks.

=== 2013 Pakistan general election ===
On 11 May 2013, a general election took place. Palijo was a candidate for PS-47 Qasimabad, Hyderabad constituency. Palijo lost the contest with 14,901 votes. Palijo challenged the result in the Sindh High Court and asked for a re-election. He claimed his agents at the polling booths had been harassed.

=== Disagreement with M. Q. M. ===
On 4 January 2014, Altaf Hussain and the Muttahida Qaumi Movement (M.Q.M.) called for a separate province. Palijo disagreed and threatened strikes and protests. Two days later the M.Q.M sent a delegation under Wasim Akhtar and Kunwar Naveed to discuss the matter with Ayaz Latif Palijo and explained to him that they don't want the division of Sindh or a separate province, they just want powers for local government in Karachi. Palijo called off the strikes and protests.
