= Jam Saqi =

Pakistani politician (1944–2018)

Jam Saqi ڄام ساقي
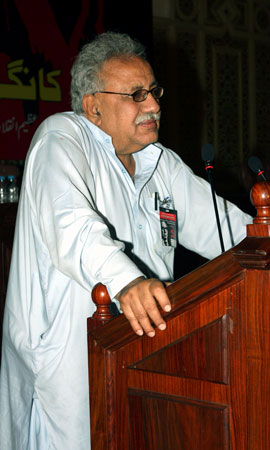
- Born: October 31, 1944; Chachro, Tharparkar, Sindh, Pakistan
- Died: March 5, 2018 (aged 73); Hyderabad, Sindh, Pakistan

Jam Saqi (Sindhi: ڄام ساقي) (October 31, 1944 – March 5, 2018) popularly known as Comrade Jam Saqi, was a left-wing politician from Sindh, Pakistan. He was previously the general secretary of the Communist Party of Pakistan. Saqi was imprisoned for more than 15 years due to his political activities. During his period in jail his then wife, Sukhan, had committed suicide after reading a newspaper containing allegations of Jam Saqi's death. He then left the Communist Party in 1991 and joined the Pakistan Peoples Party and the Trotskyist The Struggle group. He was married to Akhtar Sultana.

== Biography ==
Born in village Janjhi, Taluka Chhachhro, district Tharparkar, in the home of Muhammad Sachal who was an educationalist and a well known social worker at Thar, Saqi passed his matriculation examinations from Local Board High School, Chachro in 1962. Later, he studied at Government College, Sachal Sarmast Arts College Hyderabad, and Sindh University, Jamshoro from where he did his Masters. In an interview Jam Saqi recounted later that a retired primary teacher Inayatullah Dhamchar put him in touch with the underground Communist Party of Pakistan.

Saqi, a fiery student leader of yesteryears, was arrested after the incident of 4 March 1967. Later he founded Sindh National Students Federation (SNSF) – a student wing of Communist Party on November 3, 1968, of which he was the founder president with Nadeem Akhter as the founding vice president and Mir Thebo as general secretary of the organization. Saqi worked with Comrade Haider Bux Jatoi, G.M Syed, Qazi Faiz Muhammad, Ghulam Muhammad Laghari and many other nationalist and peasant workers of Sindh. In 1969, he joined Sindh Hari Committee (Sindh Peasants organisation) at Sakrand Hari conference. Small wonder, then, that Pakistan People's Party emerged victorious in Sindh and Punjab, Awami League in East Pakistan and National Awami Party in North West Frontier Province (NWFP) and Balochistan. All of them had socialist leaning," Saqi told The News. He had to serve sentence awarded by military court in early 70s. Later he joined National Awami Party and was elected joint secretary of the party. However, he regretted that while Bhutto and Maulana Bhashani openly espoused socialism, the communist cadre was taught to retrain themselves to the slogan of national democratic revolution. In 1971 when a military operation was initiated in East Pakistan, his organization brought out rallies against the military junta in Hyderabad and Nawabshah. During this period he went underground and organised peasants and youth of Sindh.

In 1983, he along with Prof. Jamal Naqvi, Sohail Sangi, Badar Abro, Kamal Warsi and Shabir Shar was tried in a special military court for allegedly acting against the ideology of Pakistan. Stalwarts, such as Pakistan Peoples Party leader Benazir Bhutto, Baloch leader Mir Ghous Bux Bizenjo, Khan Abdul Wali Khan, Begum Tahira Mazhar Ali Khan, Mairaj Mohammad Khan, Fatehyab Ali Khan, Maulana Shah Mohammed Amroti, some renowned journalists Manhaj Burna, Shaikh Ali Mohammad, Shaikh Aziz, Iqbal Jafri, student leaders Hasil Bezinjo, and so on, were his defence witnesses. This case is also known as Communist case or Jam Saqi Case.

Jam Saqi supported the anti Zia MRD movement launched by the alliance of political parties.

Jam Saqi is also an author. He wrote a novelet "Khahori Khijan", a book about students movement in Sindh "Sindh Ji Shagrid Tahreek", while his court statements in the special military courts were published in book format (in both Urdu and Sindhi languages) with the names "Tareekh Moonkhay na wesarreendi" and "Zameer ke Qaidi". In 2009 he was given a lifetime achievement award for his outstanding services rendered for betterment of working class conditions and human rights.

== Death ==
On 5 March 2018, Saqi died at the age of 73, due to kidney failure in Hyderabad, Sindh. In the evening, after the namaz-e-janaza he was laid to rest at the Baban Shah graveyard in Hyderabad.

== See also ==
- Jam Saqi case
- Politics of Pakistan
