= Badam Natawan =

Pakistani Sindhi-language writer (1924–1988)

- بادام ناتوان
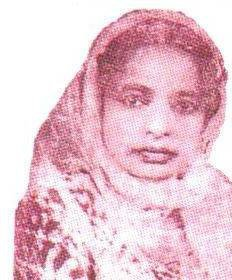
- Born: Badam; 7 March 1924; Shikarpur, Sindh, British India
- Died: 8 February 1988 (aged 63); Shikarpur, Sindh, Pakistan
- Education: University of Bombay
- Occupation: Writer
- Children: Naseem Thebo; Mir Thebo; Nazir Thebo; Gulzar Ahmed Thebo; Aftab Thebo; Mukhtiar Thebo; Shahzado Thebo
- Relatives: Roshan Ara Mughal (sister)
- Writing career
- Notable works: Shikasta Zindagi; Khush Khaslat Khatoon; Qalbi Ujj

Badam Natawan (Sindhi: بادام ناتوان; 7 March 1924 – 8 February 1988) was a Pakistani Sindhi-language writer. She is regarded as among the earliest generation of women writers in Sindhi and was the author of three published books. Her sister Roshan Ara Mughal and her daughter Naseem Thebo were also writers.

== Early life and education ==
Badam Natawan was born on 7 March 1924 in Shikarpur, in the Sindh province of British India. Her father was Muhammad Hassan and her mother served as the headmistress of a local school. She passed her matriculation examination under the University of Bombay and was proficient in Arabic, Persian, English and Sindhi.

== Personal life ==
Natawan was married to Mir Abdul Baqui Thebo, of the village of Ghari in Mehar Taluka, Dadu District. Her son Mir Thebo became a political activist and communist leader; her daughter Naseem Thebo became a noted short-story writer and a faculty member of the Department of Economics at the University of Sindh, Jamshoro. Her second daughter, Benazir Thebo, and her sister, Roshan Ara Mughal, were also writers.

== Literary career ==
Natawan began writing at a time when formal education remained largely inaccessible to women in the region, and she is counted among the earliest generation of Sindhi women writers. Her first book, Shikasta Zindagi (Sindhi: شڪسته زندگي, lit. 'Fractured Life'), was published in two volumes in 1950 by Bashir & Sons of Karachi. Her second book, Khush Khaslat Khatoon (Sindhi: خوش خصلت خاتون, lit. 'Good-Mannered Woman'), was published in 1956 by the Sindhi Adabi Board in Jamshoro. Her third book, Qalbi Ujj (Sindhi: قلبي اڃ), appeared in 1966, published by Moulvi Muhammad Azeem & Sons of Shikarpur.

A number of her manuscripts are reported to have remained unpublished at the time of her death, including:

- Runam Rat Phura (Sindhi: رنم رت ڦڙا)
- Khalwat Men (Sindhi: خلوت ۾)
- Nimani Nar (Sindhi: نماڻي نار)

== Death ==
Natawan died on 8 February 1988 in Shikarpur.
