= Khwaja Sarwar Hasan =

Pakistani author, journalist and academician (1902–1973)

- Born: 18 October 1902; Panipat, British India
- Died: 12 February 1973 (aged 70); Karachi, Sindh, Pakistan
- Organization: Pakistan Institute of International Affairs (founder)
- Movement: Pakistan Movement
- Awards: Pakistan Post Office issued a commemorative postage stamp to honor him on 18 November 2005

Khwaja Sarwar Hasan or K. Sarwar Hasan (18 October 1902 – 12 February 1973) was a Pakistani author, journalist and academician.

== Early life and education ==
K. Sarwar Hasan was born on 18 October 1902 at Panipat in British India into a family that had a long tradition of learning. His family had lived in Panipat since the days of the Emperor Balban (1216 – 1287). He was educated at the Aligarh Muslim University, and the University of Cambridge, England. He was called to the Bar at the Middle Temple, England.

== Career ==
He was a vigorous supporter of the Pakistan Movement before the independence of Pakistan in 1947. Khwaja worked as a Professor of Law at Delhi University for 14 years. The British government in India appointed him Secretary of Indian Institute of International Affairs in 1944. This institute was later shifted to Karachi by him along with its rare books collection after 1947. Based in Karachi, Khwaja Sarwar Hasan founded the first and trailblazing think tank Pakistan Institute of International Affairs (PIIA) in 1948. It was formally inaugurated by the then Prime Minister of Pakistan, Liaquat Ali Khan in 1948.

He was very dedicated and devoted to nurturing this institute's development and growth in Pakistan throughout his life. Khwaja Hasan was heart-broken when he saw his admired leader Zulfiqar Ali Bhutto, first in the name of Islamic socialism, later due to his autocratic and dictatorial tendencies, take steps that would end up destroying PIIA.

In 1963, he was a visiting professor at Columbia University, New York.

=== Representative of Pakistan ===
When some Asian and African states held a historic meeting in Indonesia in 1955, now known as Bandung Conference, he was appointed as its Joint Secretary. Khwaja also served many times as a representative of Pakistan and pleaded its case on Kashmir at the United Nations General Assembly and United Nations Security Council.

== Commemorative postage stamp ==
Pakistan Post Office issued a commemorative postage stamp to honor him in its 'Men of Letters' series, on 18 November 2005.

== Publications ==
- Pakistan and the United Nations (New York 1960)
- Introducing Pakistan (Karachi 1948)
- The Genesis of Pakistan (Karachi 1950)
- The Strategic Interests of Pakistan (editor) including The transfer of Power, The Kashmir Question, and China, India and Pakistan (Karachi 1966)
- Pakistan Institute of International Affairs, Khwaja Sarwar Hasan as the founder secretary of this institute, edited its quarterly journal, Pakistan Horizon for 25 years

== Death ==
Khwaja Sarwar Hasn died in Karachi on 12 February 1973 at age 70.
