= Pakistan Institute of International Affairs =

Non-profit organization based in Karachi

- Abbreviation: PIIA
- Formation: 1948 (formal inauguration by Liaquat Ali Khan, Prime minister of Pakistan
- Legal status: Non-governmental Organization (NGO); Nonprofit Organization
- Headquarters: Aiwan-e-Sadar Road, Civil Lines, Karachi, Pakistan
- Website: https://piia.org.pk/

The Pakistan Institute of International Affairs (PIIA; ادارہَ بین الاقوامی اُمورِ پاکستان) is a non-profit, non-governmental organization based in Karachi whose mission is to analyse and promote the understanding of major international issues and current affairs.

== History ==
PIIA was founded in 1947 in Karachi in affiliation with the Royal Institute of International Affairs (RIIA), London, and the Institute of Pacific Relations, New York City. The formal inauguration by the prime minister of Pakistan, Liaquat Ali Khan took place on 26 March 1948. The draft memorandum of the PIIA was considered and approved on 28 September 1948. Housed first in the Intelligence School on Queen's Road, the PIIA later moved to Frere Hall and thence, in 1955 (when the institute's building was completed), to its present location on Aiwan-e-Sadar Road, Karachi opposite the Sindh Governor House.

== Standing ==
According to a research report published by the Think Tanks and Civil Societies Programme (TTCSP) at the University of Pennsylvania, the Pakistan Institute of International Affairs have clinched position among top 20 think tanks of the world, PIIA has secured the 18th position among 95 other think tanks in South Asia and the Pacific region in the 2015 Global Go To Think Tank Index Report published on January 29.

The PIIA stands high in ranking of research institutes especially in the context of Pakistan. The PIIA members have also been addressed by several scholars and well-renowned figures from around the world including Arnold J. Toynbee, Justice Potter Stewart of the US Supreme Court and Justice Philip C. Jessup of the International Court of Justice; statesmen such as Prime Minister S.W.R.D. Bandaranaike of Sri Lanka, Clement Attlee, Henry Kissinger and Ralph Bunche, Richard Nixon, Sutan Sjahrir of Indonesia; and national leaders such as Prime Minister Liaquat Ali Khan, President Ayub Khan, Prime Minister Zulfikar Ali Bhutto, President General Zia-ul-Haq, Prime Minister Benazir Bhutto, Chief Justice of Pakistan Syed Sajjad Ali Shah, Foreign Minister Khurshid Mahmood Kasuri, Admiral Afzal Tahir and President General Pervez Musharraf. In April 2017, National Security Adviser Nasir Khan Janjua addressed an event arranged by the Pakistan Institute of International Affairs.

== Objectives ==
The institute is a nonofficial, nonpartisan, nonprofit body. Its objectives are to encourage and facilitate an understanding of international affairs, and of the conditions and attitudes of foreign countries and their peoples; and to promote the scientific study of international politics, economics and jurisprudence.

== Areas of research ==
Areas of research of the PIIA include foreign relations and diplomacy, security and defense, development studies, economic issues, political issues, conflict resolution, human rights, Armament, disarmament and the dynamics of security in the world.

== Funding sources ==
The PIIA's funding is self generated, and comes from rental income (80%), membership fees (3%), and publications sales (3%). It does not accept contract research, and had a 2000 budget of USD $47,430.

== Staff ==
The PIIA has twenty-one staff members, including two in research, one professional librarian, and 18 among administrative staff members.

=== Executive Officers ===
- K. Sarwar Hasan (also known as Khwaja Sarwar Hasan) (1902 – 1973) (former executive and one of the founders of PIIA in 1948)
- Masuma Hasan (Chairperson)
- Amjad Saqib (Secretary)

== Periodicals ==
The Pakistan Horizon, founded in 1948, is the oldest research journal of international affairs on the Indian sub-continent. The Horizon is written in English, and operates on a quarterly subscription model.

The PIIA's library holds 30,557 books, and 225 periodicals.

=== Research findings ===
The PIIA's articles are all accessible. Some recent titles of the Pakistan Horizon include: Kashmir (April 2003); Pakistan-India Relations (July 2004); Afghanistan after 9/11 (January 2006), Pakistan's Foreign Policy Analysis (April 2007), Challenges to Global Security (July 2007, Women's Concerns in International Relations (October 2007)and Founding Members' Number (January–April 2008).

== Former research officers ==
- Khalida Qureshi from 1962, later director of research and editor Pakistan Horizon, a position she held until her death in 1983
- Ambassador Karamatullah K. Ghori
- Zubeida Mustafa
- Prof. Dr. Naveed Ahmed Tahir
- Prof. Dr. Moonis Ahmar
- Prof. Dr. Sheikh Mutahir Ahmed
- Tehmina Mehmood
- Dr. Samina Ahmed
- Dr. Nausheen Wasi
- Syed Junaid Ahsan
- Nabiha Gul
- Sanam Noor
- Fizzah Ali
- Yasir Hanif
- Muhammad Adeel Qureshi

=== Head of Research ===
- Dr. Masuma Hasan

=== Former chairpersons ===
- Fatehyab Ali Khan (1936 – 26 September 2010)

== See also ==
- Think tank
- Institute of Policy Studies (Pakistan)
