= Anjuman Talaba-e-Islam =

Anjuman Talaba-e-Islam Pakistan انجُمن طلَبہِ اِسلام
- President: Faisal Qayyum Magray
- Secretary-General: Baydar Hussain
- Founder: Allama Jameel Ahmed Naeemi
- Founded: 20 January 1968 (20th Shawwal 1387 A.H)
- Headquarters: Karachi, Pakistan.
- Religion: Sunni Islam
- Colors: Green Red and Green
- Slogan: Syedi Murshidi Ya Nabi ...Ya Nabi

Party flag

Anjuman Talaba-e-Islam (Urdu: انجُمن طلَبہِ اِسلام, "Islamic Organization of Students") is a student organization related to the Hanafi school of thought made to promote the "love of the Prophet" (Ishq-e-Rasool) and to protect the rights of the students of Barelvi community. Anjuman Talaba-e-Islam was founded on 20 January 1968 with respect to 20th Shawwal 1387 A.H in Karachi, Pakistan by Jameel Ahmed Naeemi, Haji Hanif Tayyab along with some of their fellow students.

== Political protests ==
Anjuman Talaba-e-Islam, in October 2001 before impending U.S. attack on Afghanistan, had taken out a protest rally against it in Khairpur, Sindh.

ATI arranged massive protests and conferences to support Kashmir's Freedom movement.
