= Nemrah Ahmed Khan =

Pakistani writer

- Born: 9 September 1990 (age 35); Bhakkar, Pakistan
- Education: Master's in English literature
- Occupations: Writer, novelist
- Website: nemrahahmad.com zanjabeel.com

Nemrah Ahmed Khan (نمرہ احمد خان) pen name: Nimra Ahmed (نمرہ احمد); born 9 September 1990 in Bhakkar, Pakistan) is a Pakistani Urdu language novelist and author. She is originally from Mianwali.

== Career ==
Nemrah Ahmed published her first novel Mere Khuab, Mere Jugnu at the age of 16 in 2007 in Shuaa Digest, a women's monthly magazine; it was later published as a hardcover book. After obtaining her master's degree in English literature, she undertook writing as a full-time job. She has written twelve novels. Each novel carries different themes than others. Her breakthrough novel was Mus'haf, which featured at New Delhi World Book Fair 2017. In March 2016, Ahmed launched her own bookstore, "Zanjabeel"; the name derives from the Arabic word for ginger and represents one of the springs in Jannah.

== Writing style ==
Nemrah Ahmed often incorporates the Qur'an and its verses in her writings. Her works are known for their thorough research and exploration of various themes and styles, including religion, and suspense. She is known for her deep characters, Islamic themes, and suspenseful storytelling. and issues related to religion, problems in society, and the culture of countries such as Turkey (as in Jannat Kay Pattay (Leaves of Paradise)). She earned a place on The News Women Power 50 list for three consecutive years.

== Works ==
=== Novels ===
- Mere Khuab Mere Jugnu – 2007
- Pahari Ka Qaidi – 2008
- Mehrunnisa – 2008
- Saans Sakin Thi – 2008
- Karakoram Ka Taj Mahal
- Paras - 2013
- Beli Rajputan Ki Malika – 2010
- Mus'haf – 2011
- Jannat Kay Pattay (Leaves of Paradise) – 2013
- Namal (The Ants) – 2014
- Haalim – 2017
- Maala – 2022-2024

=== Short stories ===
- "Hudd", 2012
- "Ahmaq Tamasha", 2012
- "Gumaan / Woh mera hai", 2011
- "Iblees", 2012
- "Apni Ungli", 2013

=== Other books ===
- Mein Anmol
- Husn e Anjam
- Home Girl
