= Democratic Students Federation =

Student organization in Pakistan

Democratic Students Federation (DSF) is a left-wing student organization in Pakistan. It was first established on 13 January 1951 in Karachi by students of the Dow Medical College, led by Mohammad Sarwar and including MRA Hashmi, Asif Jaffery, Asif Hameedi, Yousuf Ali and S Haroon Ahmed, as the organization that previously dominated campuses, the Muslim Students Federation (affiliated with the Muslim League), began to wither. From its inception, it was close to the Communist Party of Pakistan (CPP), and therefore banned along with the CPP in 1954. Its members, however, managed to infiltrate other student organizations, notably the National Students Federation founded in 1958.

It emerged as a splinter group of the National Students Federation in the early 1970s when a pro-China faction of NSF parted from its pro-Moscow parent party, the Communist Party of Pakistan.

In 1981, Anwar Zeb and his associates started the revival of DSF in partnership with the Communist Party of Pakistan (CPP). DSF was further reorganized in 1982, and quickly spread through all of Pakistan. It played an active role in uniting students, labour unions, nationalists and left wing parties to struggle against Ziaul Haq's military and fundamentalist rule. During the struggle it lost its leader Nazir Abbasi who was tortured and killed in military custody. Many of its leaders were thrown in prisons and punished. This leftist and secular organization became more popular in North-West Frontier Province (Pakhtunkhwa), which is now a center of Islamist militancy. However, its influence started to decline after the collapse of Soviet Union in the early 1990s.
