= Nazeer Abbasi =

Pakistani politician

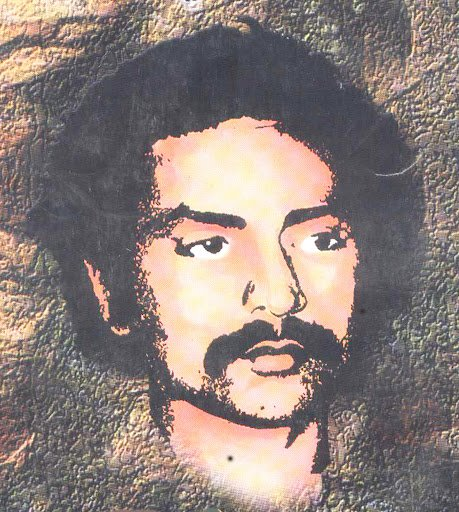
- Born: April 10, 1953; Tando Allahyar, Sindh, Pakistan
- Died: August 9, 1980 (aged 27)
- Cause of death: Torture
- Resting place: Karachi

Nazeer Abbasi (Sindhi: محمد نذير عباسي; 10 April 1953 – 9 August 1980) was a Pakistani communist leader and the youngest member of the Central Committee of the Communist Party of Pakistan. He was tortured to death on 9 August 1980 during the government of Muhammad Zia-ul-Haq while in the custody of the Field Intelligence Unit (FIU) of the Pakistan Army. His family accused ISI operative Brigadier Imtiaz Ahmed Billa of torturing and killing Abbasi while in his custody. His family said post-mortem reports revealed death as a result of torture and claimed that Benazir Bhutto "herself had informed" Abbasi's wife over Imtiaz Billa's involvement. Billa was later court-martialed.

== Early life and education ==
Abbasi was born to Jan Muhammad Abbasi and Qamar-ul-Nisa in Tando Allahyar, Sindh, Pakistan on 10 April 1953. After completing his intermediate education, he Started working at Municipal Committee Tando Allahyar and Organized a Union of Municipal Workers. He went on to study at the Sindh University where he got B.Sc. in Political science. He married Hameeda Ghanghro on 4 February 1978 and had a daughter, Zarqa Abbasi.

== Political career ==
He started politics during student life. He was first arrested as a member of Azad Marorra Students Federation in 1969, which was demanding the publication of the electoral voter lists in Sindhi language. In prison he met communists and leaders of National Students Federation. In jail he was influenced by fellow political prisoners belonging to Sindh National Students Federation, an organization which he joined, and later became leader of. Abbasi was arrested again in May 1978 by military during the dictatorship of Zia-ul-Haq charged with publication of clandestine monthly Halchal and was sent to notorious prison Quli Camp, Quetta.

During that period many of the members of Sindh National Students Federation and Sindh Hari Committee were arrested from all over Sindh. He was arrested again by the Field Intelligence Unit (FIU) of Pakistan Army's Brigadier Billa from Karachi on 30 July 1980, along with Professor Jamal Naqvi, Amarlal, Kamal Warsi and Shabbir Shar, who were later joined by Sohail Sangi, Badar Abro and others.

Abbasi was arrested on 30 July 1980 with other party workers. He was killed while the rest of the group were tried in a military court in what came to be known as the Jam Saqi case.

== Death ==
Nazeer Abbasi was tortured to death on 9 August 1980.
