= Zaitoon Bano =

Pakistani feminist writer (1938-2021)

- زیتون بانو
- Born: 18 June 1938; Sufaid Dheri, Peshawar, Pakistan
- Died: 14 September 2021 (aged 83); Peshawar, Pakistan
- Education: Urdu and Pashto; Master's
- Alma mater: Islamia College University
- Occupations: Writer; Poet; Women's rights activist
- Spouse: Taj Saeed (Note: died in 2002. See Taj Saeed at Rekhta Foundation)
- Parent: Pir Syed Sultan Mahmood Shah (father)
- Relatives: Pir Syed Abdul Qudus Tundar (grandfather)
- Writing career
- Language: Pashto, Urdu
- Years active: 1958–2021
- Genres: Plays, Short stories, Novels
- Subjects: Politics, Social, Literature
- Notable awards: Pride of Performance

Zaitoon Bano (18 June 1938 – 14 September 2021), also spelled Zaitun Banu, was a Pakistani poet, short story writer, novelist, broadcaster, and advocate of women's rights in Khyber Pakhtunkhwa. She primarily wrote in Pashto and Urdu languages. Sometimes, she is referred to as Khatun-e-Awal (the first lady) or "first lady of Pashto fiction", an honorary title awarded to her in recognition of her contribution to women's rights of Pashtuns. She wrote over twenty-four books, including her first short story titled Hindara (Mirror) which appears one of the prominent writings of Pashto language.

She was born to Pir Syed Sultan Mahmood Shah in Sufaid Dheri village of Peshawar, Pakistan. She married Taj Saeed and was the granddaughter of Pir Syed Abdul Qudus Tundar, a Pashto poet. She is sometimes referred to as the first Pashto literati to have addressed the social issues of Pashtun women through her writings.

== Education and background ==
Zaitoon received her primary schooling and matriculation from a city school, and later obtained a master's degree from the Islamia College University in Pashto and Urdu as a private student. After completing her education, she taught at various educational institutions, notably Peshawar Public School, and later joined Pakistan Broadcasting Corporation where she served as a producer. Prior to debuting in writings, she was associated with the Radio Pakistan and Pakistan Television Corporation, a state-owned Television channel.

== Literary career ==
Bano began her career in 1958 when she was studying in ninth grade with her first short story titled Hindara (Mirror). Between 1958 and 2008, she wrote fiction books and short stories in Urdu and Pashto languages. Her publications include Maat Bangree, Khoboona (1958), Juandi Ghamoona (1958), Berge Arzoo (1980), and Waqt Kee Dehleez Par (1980). Among other publications she published short stories titled Da Shagu Mazal (A Journey Through Sands) written between 1958 and 2017. She wrote only one poetry collection in Pashto titled Manjeela (head cushion) which was published in 2006. Besides writing, she is also credited with having contributed to numerous radio and television plays.

=== Work ===
Key
†	Remarks denote a short description of the work where available.

#	Title	Year	Type/Credited as	Remarks
1	Hindara (Miror)	1958	Short story	—N/a
2	Maat Bangree	1958	Short story	—N/a
3	Juandi Ghamoona	1958	Short story	—N/a
4	Sheesham Ka Pata	1978	Short story	—N/a
5	Bargad Ka Saiya	1978	Short story	—N/a
6	Berge Arzoo	1980	Novel	It was later broadcast as an Urdu serial on Pakistan Television under the title Dhool.
7	Waqt Kee Dehleez	1980	Short story	—N/a
8	Khoboona	1986	Short story	Later released as a play in 1991
9	Kachkol	1991	Play	—N/a
10	Zama Dairy	—N/a	Book	—N/a
11	Naizurray	—N/a	Book	—N/a
12	Da Shagu Mazal (A journey through sands)	—N/a	Book	It covers the social issues of the Pakhtun women
13	Manjeela (head cushion)	—N/a	Poem	—N/a

== Death ==
She died on 14 September 2021 at the Lady Reading Hospital in Peshawar, Pakistan following her chronic condition.

== Awards and accolades ==
Zaitoon was awarded fifteen national literary awards including the Pride of Performance and Fakhr-i- Peshawar award in recognition of her contribution to Pashto and Urdu fiction. In 2016, a panel of the Sustainable Development Goals, awarded her an honorary title Khatun-e-Awal (first lady) or "first lady of Pashto fiction" during the International Women’s Day celebration in recognition of her service to the women's rights in Khyber Pakhtunkhwa.
