= Zeenat Abdullah Channa =

Pakistani educationist and writer (1919–1974)

Zeenat Abdullah Channah زينت عبداللٰه چنه
- Zeenat Abdullah Channa زينت چنه
- Born: زينت; 4 January 1919; Sehwan, District Jamshoro, Sindh, British Raj
- Died: 12 July 1974 (aged 55); Hyderabad, Sindh, Pakistan
- Occupation: Writer
- Spouse: Abdullah Khan Channah
- Children: Nusrat, Nighat, Shauqat and Talat
- Writing career
- Notable work: Editor of monthly Marvi

Zeenat Abdullah Channah (Sindhi: زينت عبداللٰه چنه January 4, 1919 – July 12, 1974) was an educationist and writer from Sehwan, Sindh, Pakistan. She was one of the first female writers to write Sindhi stories after the partition of India in 1947. Zeenat Channah served as the editor of the monthly magazine Marvi. She motivated parents in rural Sindh to educate their daughters. In addition to being a teacher and storyteller, she also wrote literary articles.

== Childhood and personal life ==
Zeenat Abdullah Channa was born on January 4, 1919, in Sehwan Sharif, District Jamshoro, Sindh, Pakistan. Her father, Muhammad Saleh Channa, was a postmaster. Her younger brother, Mahboob Channa, was a scholar and renowned writer. She studied in her hometown of Sehwan and later attended the Training College for Women in Hyderabad. She started her career as a school teacher in Talti, a town near Sehwan Sharif. She retired as Head Mistress. During her teaching career she always encouraged young girls to pursue education.

She married Abdullah Khan Channa on August 13, 1944. Her husband was Deputy Collector of Sehwan. He was also a researcher and writer. Together they had 3 daughters, Nusrat, Nighat and Talat, and one son, Shauqat Channa.

== Literary contributions ==
Zeenat Channa was one of the best Sindhi story writers after the partition of India in 1947. Her stories were published in reputable Sindhi magazines including Mehran and Naeen Zindagi. She also authored a number of good quality literary articles and essays. Some of her best stories include Randiko (Toy), oondahi (Darkness), and Mithi (Sweet). She served as an editor of Monthly women magazine "Marvi" which was very popular among the readers. She compiled a book titled Yadgar e Latif in 1958.

== Death ==
She died on July 12, 1974 in Hyderabad, Sindh, Pakistan.
