= Awami Tahreek =

Awami Tahreek عوامي تحريڪ
- President: Wasand Thari (AT Faction) (QAT Faction)
- General Secretary: Sajid Hussain Mahesar (AT Faction)
- Founder: Rasool Bux Palijo
- Founded: 5 March 1970
- Preceded by: Sindhi Awami Tahreek
- Headquarters: Qasimabad, Hyderabad, Sindh, Pakistan
- Ideology: Communism; Marxism–Leninism–Maoism; Progressivism; Secularism; Socialism; Sindhi nationalism Left-wing nationalism Left-wing populism
- Political position: Left-wing to far-left
- Religion: Secular
- National Affiliation of QAT: GDA
- Colors: Red and Black

Election symbol
- Whistle (QAT Faction); Slingshot (AT Faction)

Party flag

Awami Tahreek, formerly Sindhi Awami Tahreek (English: Sindhi People's Movement), is a Marxist–Leninist–Maoist political party based in the Pakistani province of Sindh, and headquartered in Hyderabad.

== Formation ==
Awami Tahreek was formed on 5 March 1970, by the leading writers, activists, and intellectuals in Hyderabad, Sindh. At the first party meeting, the leading theoretician Rasool Bux Palijo was elected as its first general secretary. It has gradually evolved into a national party and supported the anti-feudal elements against the PPP-P and PML-N in Sindh and Western Punjab.

== History ==
Awami Tahreek has supported movements including:

- Neelam Band Karyo Movement
- Sindhi Voter Lists Movement
- MRD
- Journalist Movement
- Anti-Urban Terrorism Movement and
- Anti-Kalabagh Dam and Thal Canal Movement

Recently, Awami Tahreek has started to create local/regional offices in other provinces, and has broadened its political philosophy from a provincial to a national level.

=== Split into AT and QAT ===
In 2013, Awami Tehreek was later renamed as Qaumi Awami Tehreek (QAT) and Rasul Bux Palijo's son Ayaz Latif Palijo became its central leader but in 2016, due to some internal rifts between Rasul Bux Palijo and Ayaz Latif Palijo, Rasul Bux Palijo announced to revive Awami Tehreek again as a separate faction distancing from his son led QAT.

== Ideology ==
Awami Tahreek is a political party devoted to non-violence in its democratic struggle to attain freedom of the people through the scientific and revolutionary tenets of Marxism–Leninism–Maoism. It is committed to people's democracy, economic and social justice, and establishment of a welfare state in a country where people can have equity, political freedom, economic opportunity, and genuine provincial autonomy.

Its platform is that a comprehensive overhauling of society is required in order to deliver the benefits of a welfare state to the masses. Awami Tahreek stands for equal rights for all citizens without distinction of sex, class, color, language, faith, or creed.

Awami Tahreek is strict in opposing capitalism, imperialism, army rule, dictatorships, terrorism, corruption, racism, gender discrimination, and religious bigotry. Awami Tahreek promises to replace feudalism with principles of socialism to protect and advance the interests of peasantry.

Awami Tahreek continues to champion the cause of the unity of Pakistan in general and Sindh in particular, the caste system, communities, minorities, and ethnic groups. Since the foundation of the party, it has come forward as a builder of Muslim-Hindu-Christian unity.

== Political movements ==
Awami Tahreek opposed the division of Sindh, holding a "Mohabbat Sindh Rally" (love and sanctity of Sindh Dharti) against the division.

== See also ==
- Fazil Rahu
- Hyder Bux Jatoi
- Sindhiani Tahreek
- Zarina Baloch
- Sindh Hari Committee
- Jami Chandio
