= Sumaira Zareen =

Pakistani writer (1944–1977)

- ثميره زرين
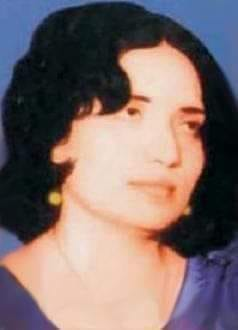
- Born: 22 February 1944; Shikarpur, Sindh, Pakistan
- Died: 13 August 1977; Hyderabad, Sindh
- Occupation: Story writer
- Relatives: Muhammad Azam Aiwan (Father)
- Writing career
- Period: 1954–1977
- Notable works: Story collections: Geet Ujayal More Ja; Aaoon Uhai Marvi; Roshan Chhanwro

Sumaira Zareen (Sindhi: ثميره زرين ) (February 1944 - 13 August 1977) was a prominent story writer of Sindh, Pakistan. She was one of the pioneering women of Sindhi literature and is often referred to as the First Lady of Sindhi Literature. Two of her story collections have been published.

== Childhood ==
Sumaira Zareen was born on 22 February 1944 into a literary family in Shikarpur Sindh, Pakistan. Her real name was Sakina Aiwan. Her father's name was Muhammad Azam Aiwan. Her grandfather Muhammad Arif Aiwan was a renowned poet of his time.

== Literary Contributions ==
She started writing stories at the age of 12 or 13 years. Her first story was published in famous Sindhi magazine Naeen Zindagi (New Life). She served as the In-Charge of Women's page of daily Hilal-e-Pakistan. After graduation, she worked as a research fellow at the Institute of Sindhology. She compiled and published stories from the Naeen Zindagi magazine from 1947 to 1960. The title of the collection was Mehran Joon Chholiyoon (Waves in the Indus) and it was published in 1962. In 1970, her story collection Geet Ujayal More Ja (songs of thirsty peacocks) was published by Malir Adabi Academy Hyderabad. Another two of her story collections were published posthumously:

- Aaoon Uhai Marvi (I am the same Marvi)
- Roshan Chhanwro (Bright Shade)

Noted writer Nasir Mirza has compiled her unpublished stories and her profile in his book Khatton - e - Awal Kahanikara: Sumera Zareen (First Lady of stories: Sumera Zareen). This book was published in 2018. The famous literary magazine Rachna published a special issue in her memory in 2014.

== Death ==
Sumaira Zareen died on August 13, 1977.
