= Rasool Bux Palijo =

Pakistani revolutionary (1930-2018)

- رسول بخش پليجو
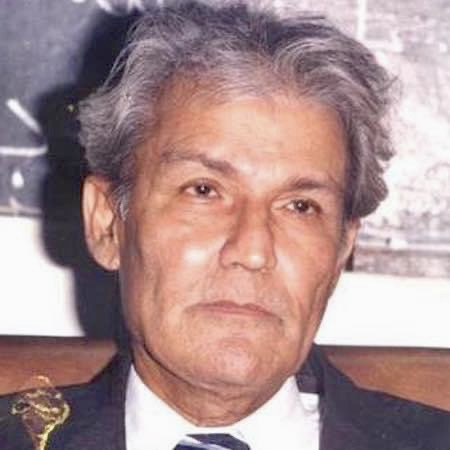

founder of Awami Tahreek
- In office 5 March 1970 – 2013
- Preceded by: Office established
- Succeeded by: Ayaz Latif Palijo

Personal details
- Born: 21 February 1930 Jungshahi, Sind, Bombay Presidency, British India (present-day Sindh, Pakistan)
- Died: 7 June 2018 (aged 88) Karachi, Sindh, Pakistan
- Resting place: Jungshahi, Sindh, Pakistan
- Party: Awami Tahreek
- Spouse(s): Sharifa Palijo; Ruqaiya; Zarina Baloch; Naseem Thebo; Zahida Shaikh
- Children: 10, including Ayaz Latif Palijo
- Education: Sindh Madrasatul Islam; Sindh Muslim Law College
- Occupation: Politician, Lawyer, Writer, Scholar, Poet

Rasool Bux Palijo (Sindhi: رسول بخش پليجو 21 February 1930 – 7 June 2018) was a Pakistani leftist, Marxist leader, scholar and writer. He was a leading human-rights lawyer and the leader and founder of Awami Tahreek, a progressive and leftist party.

== Early life ==
Rasool Bux Palijo was born in the village Mungar Khan Palijo, Jungshahi, Sindh on 21 February 1930, to Sindhi parents Ali Mohammad Palijo and Laadee Bai. He received his early education at his village and the secondary education at Sindh Madressatul Islam in Karachi. Palijo did his law graduation from Sindh Law College Karachi. He was fluent in Sindhi, Urdu, and English, and later became conversant in Hindi, Arabic, Balochi, Bengali, Punjabi and Persian.

== Entry into politics and legal career ==
Palijo served as a Supreme Court lawyer.

== Political struggle ==
In October 1979, a historic farmers' conference was held in Rahooki, which served as a referendum against martial law. Following this event, the military regime had Awami Tahreek workers whipped in Badin and arrested Palijo. Palijo was instrumental in establishing the Movement for the Restoration of Democracy (MRD), where his parties, Awami Tehrik and Sindhiani Tehrik, played a significant role. Hundreds of activists were arrested and subjected to corporal punishment. Due to his involvement in the pro-democracy movement, Palijo spent over six and a half years in various prisons, including Lahore's Kot Lakhpat Jail, and was declared a prisoner of conscience by Amnesty International.

== Personal life ==
He has six children from his first wife Shareefan Palijo: 1) Jameel Ahmed Palijo, 2) Saleem Akhtar, 3) Masood Anwar, 4) Shehnaz (Adi Pado), 5) Ghulam Hyder, and 6) Noor Nabi; two children from his second wife Ruqaya: 1) Zafar Palijo, 2) Fakhra Qalbani. Later on, he was married to Sindhi singer, activist, and author Zarina Baloch until her death on 25 October 2006. The union yielded a son Ayaz Latif Palijo. Lastly, he was married to the educationist and Sindhi-language writer, Naseem Thebo. The union yielded two children: 1) Tania Palijo, and 2) Anita Aijaz. Fifth Wife Zahida Shaikh.

=== Death ===
On 6 June 2018, he died at a hospital in Karachi. Prior to his death, he was hospitalised for a long time for cardiac and respiratory complications. On 8 June 2018, he was buried in his native village, Mungar Khan Palijo, in Thatta district.

== Books ==
Described as "the author of more than forty books on numerous subjects, ranging from literature to politics, prison dairies, philosophy, culture and poetry", his bibliography includes:

=== Sindhi ===
- Lat̤īfu shināsī. Lectures on the works of Shah Abdul Latif Bhittai.
- D̤oraju d̤īʼo hathu kare. Lectures chiefly on Sindhi literature.
- Māʼūze Tūng. Biography of Mao Zedong.
- Chā Sindhiyuni lāʼi mulkī siyāsata ḥarāmu āhe?. Analytical study of anti-Pakistan movements by Sindhi nationalists; a plea for the Sindhis to take an active part in the affairs of Pakistan.
- "Suboh theendo". written during imprisonment highlighting false and propaganda socialism in Sindh.
- "Jeko Bengal sa thiyo". The incident happened with Bengali people of Pakistan during and before 1971 war were discussed in book.
- " Vietnami kahaniyu". One of the fictional works

=== Urdu ===
- Ṣubḥ ho gī. On Sindhi nationalism.

== See also ==
- Awami Tahreek
- Hyder Bux Jatoi
- G. M. Syed
- Muhammad Ibrahim Joyo
- Shaikh Ayaz
- Zarina Baloch
- Ayaz Latif Palijo
