= Shahida Hassan =

Pakistani poet

- شاہدہ حسن
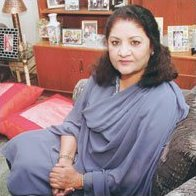
- Shahida Hassan at her home.
- Born: Syeda Shahida Hassan; 24 November 1953 (age 72); Chittagong, Pakistan (present day Bangladesh)
- Education: University of Karachi
- Occupation: Poet
- Writing career
- Language: Urdu

Shahida Hassan (Urdu: شاہدہ حسن) (born 24 November 1953) is a contemporary Urdu poet. Based in Pakistan, she is known for her poems and ghazals. Hassan has written a lot of Urdu poetry, which has been published in two authorized collections, Yahan Kuch Phool Rakhey hain and Ek Taara hai sarhaaney mere. She received her Master's in English from the University of Karachi.

== Ghazals written ==
Hassan is known for her contributions to Urdu poetry, especially in Pakistan.

She has been invited to a number of Urdu poetry sessions and events related to literature in Pakistan and various other countries. Her ghazals and poems, all with a contemporary touch, are especially admired among Urdu literature intellectuals and given praise during their many events, where she is frequently invited to narrate her written creations.
