= Jungshahi =

Pakistani town

- Town
- Location within Pakistan
- Coordinates: 24°51′26″N 67°46′21″E
- Country: Pakistan
- Province: Sindh
- District: Thatta
- Website: http://vjungshahii.wordpress.com

Jungshahi, also spelled Jang Shahi, is a town located in Thatta District of Sindh province, Pakistan. Situated to the east of Karachi, it serves as a Union Council within the Thatta tehsil. Jungshahi is located 21 kilometres (13 mi) away of the district capital, Thatta. During British rule, the North Western Railway connected the town to Karachi.

In 1949, Major General Muhammed Iftikhar Khan, who was set to become the first native commander of the Pakistan Army following the retirement of Sir Douglas Gracey, died in an air crash near the city.
