= Mir Thebo =

Pakistani politician

Mir Thebo مير ٿيٻو
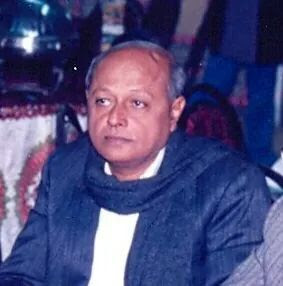
- Born: 15 December 1946 (age 79); Village Ghari, Mehar, Sindh, Pakistan
- Political party: Qaumi Inqilabi Party, Awami National Party, Pakistan National Party (Mir Ghaus Bakhsh Bizenjo) and SNSF.
- Spouse(s): Hameeda Ghanghro (divorced); Pirah Thebo (2015-present)
- Children: Manik Thebo (Son)
- Parent(s): Abdul Baqi Thebo (father); Badam Natawan (mother)

Mir Thebo (Sindhi: مير ٿيٻو) is a left-wing politician from Mehar, Sindh, Pakistan. He later left Pakistan, and now lives Austin, Texas, United States.

== Early life ==
Thebo born on 15 December 1946 at village Ghari, Mehar in Sindh. He got primary education from village Ghari. Thebo passed his matriculation examinations from Mehar and Shikarpur. Later, Sachal Sarmast College Hyderabad, Sindh and Sindh University, Jamshoro from where he did his Master's in Political Science.

== Political activism ==
He started his political career as a student worker. Jam Saqi, a fiery student leader of yesteryear's, founded Sindh National Students Federation (SNSF) – a student wing of Communist Party on November 3, 1968, of which he was the founder president, Nadeem Akhter the founding vice president and Mir Thebo the general secretary. Thebo was imprisoned 4 times, 2 days, then Ayub Khan regime 3 months, Yahya Khan's martial law 6 months, again Yahya martial law 6 months because of his political activities.

== See also ==
- Politics of Pakistan
- G M Syed
- Ghaus Bakhsh Bizenjo
