= Meraj Muhammad Khan =

Pakistani politician (1938–2016)

First General Secretary Pakistan Tehreek-e-Insaf
- In office 1998–2003

Founder and Chairman Qaumi Mahaz-i-Azadi (Party)
- In office 1977–1993

Minister of Labour and Manpower
- In office 20 December 1971 – 13 August 1973
- Preceded by: Air Marshal Nur Khan
- Succeeded by: Abdul Qayyum Khan

Vice-President of the Pakistan People's Party
- In office 30 November 1967 – 22 October 1974
- Preceded by: Office Established
- Succeeded by: Dr. Mubashir Hassan

Founding Member of the Pakistan Peoples Party
- In office 30 November 1967 – 1977

President of National Students Federation
- In office 4 July 1963 – 30 November 1967
- Preceded by: Johar Hassan
- Succeeded by: Rasheed Hassan Khan

Personal details
- Born: 20 October 1938 Farrukhabad, Uttar Pradesh, British Raj
- Died: 21 July 2016 (aged 77) Karachi, Sindh, Pakistan
- Citizenship: Pakistan
- Party: Pakistan Peoples Party
- Other political affiliations: Pakistan Tehreek-e-Insaf
- Education: Karachi University; DJ Science College
- Occupation: Politician
- Profession: Philosopher
- Cabinet: Government of Zulfikar Ali Bhutto
- Awards: Habib Jalib Award

Meraj Muhammad Khan (Urdu: معراج محمد خان; 20 October 1938 – 21 July 2016) was a well-known Pakistani socialist politician. He was noted as one of the key intellectuals and founders of the Pakistan People's Party (PPP) and as a major contributor to the initial left-of-center/social democratic so-called Basic Programme of the Pakistan Tehreek-e-Insaf (PTI). He was also the founder of Qaumi Mahaz-i-Azadi, which he founded after leaving the PPP in 1977.

He was also a well-known and influential socialist figure in the country, and known for his political struggle and advocacy against anti-capitalist convergence and the support of the social democracy.

== Early life and education ==
Khan was born on 20 October 1938, in Farrukhabad, Uttar Pradesh, British Indian Empire to an educated family of Zakha Khel Afridi tribe of Pashtun origin. He was the youngest of four sons and his father, Hakeem Molvi Taj Muhammad Khan, was a homoeopath who practised the methods of Greek medicine in Quetta, Balochistan. Veteran Pakistani journalist and trade union leader Minhaj Barna was his elder brother.

After graduating from a local high school in Quetta in 1956, Khan moved to Karachi where he attended DJ Science College and later pursued his higher education at Karachi University in 1957. He earned a BA degree in philosophy and humanities in 1960, and a master's degree in philosophy in 1962.

== Political career ==
=== Communism and PPP activism (1960s) ===
Meraj Muhammad Khan came to public prominence in the 1960s while studying at Karachi University. During this time, there was a debating competition in which students from all the colleges in Karachi were participating. At this competition, some activists of the Communist Party were sitting in the audience, who asked him to join the Communist Party after he won that debating competition.

He became an active member of the National Students Federation (NSF), eventually becoming NSF's president in 1963. Khan turned the NSF into a militant student political organization that campaigned for the rights of students. In 1967, he quit the NSF after secretly learning of a socialist convention being held in Lahore, Punjab.

He was among those who founded the Pakistan People's Party (PPP) and fully endorsed Zulfikar Ali Bhutto for the PPP's chairmanship. Through the PPP, he went into mainstream politics and successfully contested the 1970 general elections on a PPP platform from a Karachi constituency called Lalukhait.

=== Labour ministry (1971–1973) ===
In December 1971, Khan was appointed Minister for Manpower and directed the Ministry of Labour (MoL) in Prime Minister Zulfikar Ali Bhutto's government. In 1972, his tenure saw a major labour strike in Karachi; though it was peacefully resolved by Meraj's intervention. It was later reported in newspapers and television that the labour strike was actually a competition between two PPP ministers, Meraj and Law Minister Abdul Hafiz Pirzada for the control of the labour.

Meraj's radical leftist group was in direct competition against Law Minister Pirzada's Pro-Peking group. However, Meraj denied all accusations on TV.

In 1973, Meraj fell out with the Bhutto government when Bhutto started to compromise on his so-called Socialist agenda and the regime resorted to repressive measures. As time passed, his differences with Prime Minister Bhutto grew and he left the PPP to reorganize the NSF. However, Meraj fell into political isolation, never to regain his political credibility and popularity.

Commenting on the PPP, Meraj later revealed that "the radical (leftist) rhetoric was more than a mask designed to win and retain power." He once said: "Ali Bhutto was a great man ... but he could be cruel."

=== Further activism (1980s) ===
After leaving the PPP, he became a prominent democratic activist and leftist leader of the Movement for Restoration of Democracy (MRD) opposing the military government of President General Zia-ul-Haq.

=== Awami Insaf and the birth of PTI Basic Programme (1990s onwards) ===
In 1998, he joined the center-left/centrist Pakistan Tehreek-e-Insaf (PTI) headed by Imran Khan, but resigned from the party in 2003, citing differences with Khan. He then joined the Mazdoor Kisan Party, which later merged with the Communist Party of Pakistan to form the Communist Mazdoor Kissan Party.

== Death ==
Khan died at a local hospital in Karachi on 21 July 2016, at the age of 77. He had been hospitalized for a serious respiratory and lung problem for some time.

== Writings ==
In 2024 a compilation of Khan's essays, interviews and other documents, including his autobiography Taareekh Bolti Hai (History Speaks), was published under the title Nigaar-e-Sahar Ki Hasrat Mein (Yearning for the Beauty of Dawn).
