= Movement for the Restoration of Democracy =

Pakistani political alliance from 1981 to 1988

- Presidium: Rasool Bux Palijo (Awami Tahreek); Benazir Bhutto (PPP); Shaheed Fazil Rahu (Awami Tahreek); Jam Saqi (CPP); Abdul Wali Khan (ANP); Maulana Fazal-ur-Rehman (JUI(F))
- Founded: 8 February 1981
- Dissolved: 24 August 1988
- Ideology: Left-wing populism Socialism
- Political position: Left-wing
- Colors: Red

Party flag

The Movement for the Restoration of Democracy (MRD; Urdu: اتحاد برائے بحالی جمہوریت, romanised: Atehad Baraye Bahali Jamahuriyat) was a political alliance in Pakistan founded in 1981 by the political parties opposing the military government of Muhammad Zia-ul-Haq, the sixth president of Pakistan. Headed by Benazir Bhutto of the Pakistan People's Party, its objective was the end of martial law and restoration of the democracy.

Formed in February 1981, the alliance was noted for its left-wing populism orientation and had Pakistan Peoples Party (PPP), Awami National Party (ANP), Pakistan Muslim League (Khwaja Khairuddin group), Pakistan Democratic Party, Tehreek-e-Istiqlal, Awami Tehreek, Jamiat-e-Ulema-e-Islam, Mazdoor Kisan Party and Pakistan Muslim League Qasim Group led by Syed Kabir Ali Wasti. The alliance was rooted in rural areas of Sindh Province and remained mostly nonviolent, was strongest among supporters of the Pakistan People's Party (PPP). Though it launched one of the most massive nonviolent movements in South Asia since the time of Gandhi, failure to expand beyond its southern stronghold combined with effective repression from the military led to its demise a year and half later. The alliance dissolved within a week after the death of Zia which marked its way for general elections, outlined the return of Pakistan Peoples Party in national power.

== Formation ==
In the 1970s, the events leading to the success of right-wing alliance, PNA, toppled and overthrow the government of left-oriented PPP. At the time of death of Zulfikar Ali Bhutto, nearly 3,000 PPP activists and supporters were jailed, many of whom remained imprisoned for the next decade. President General Zia-ul-Haq was particularly unpopular in the Sindh Province, where support for the PPP remained relatively strong. In 1979, President General Zia-ul-Haq announced the implementation of Islamisation program and pressed his ultraconservatism policies in the country. Following the invasive Russian invasion of Afghanistan, President Zia exercised more repressive policies to curb the communist influence in the country, whilst escalating the insurgency in Pashtun-domaniated Khyber province in Western Pakistan. In response, the former rivals, ANP and CPP, decided to oppose President Zia's actions in the country, ultimately the left-wing sphere formed an alliance with the PPP which was the most influential of all left-wing parties.

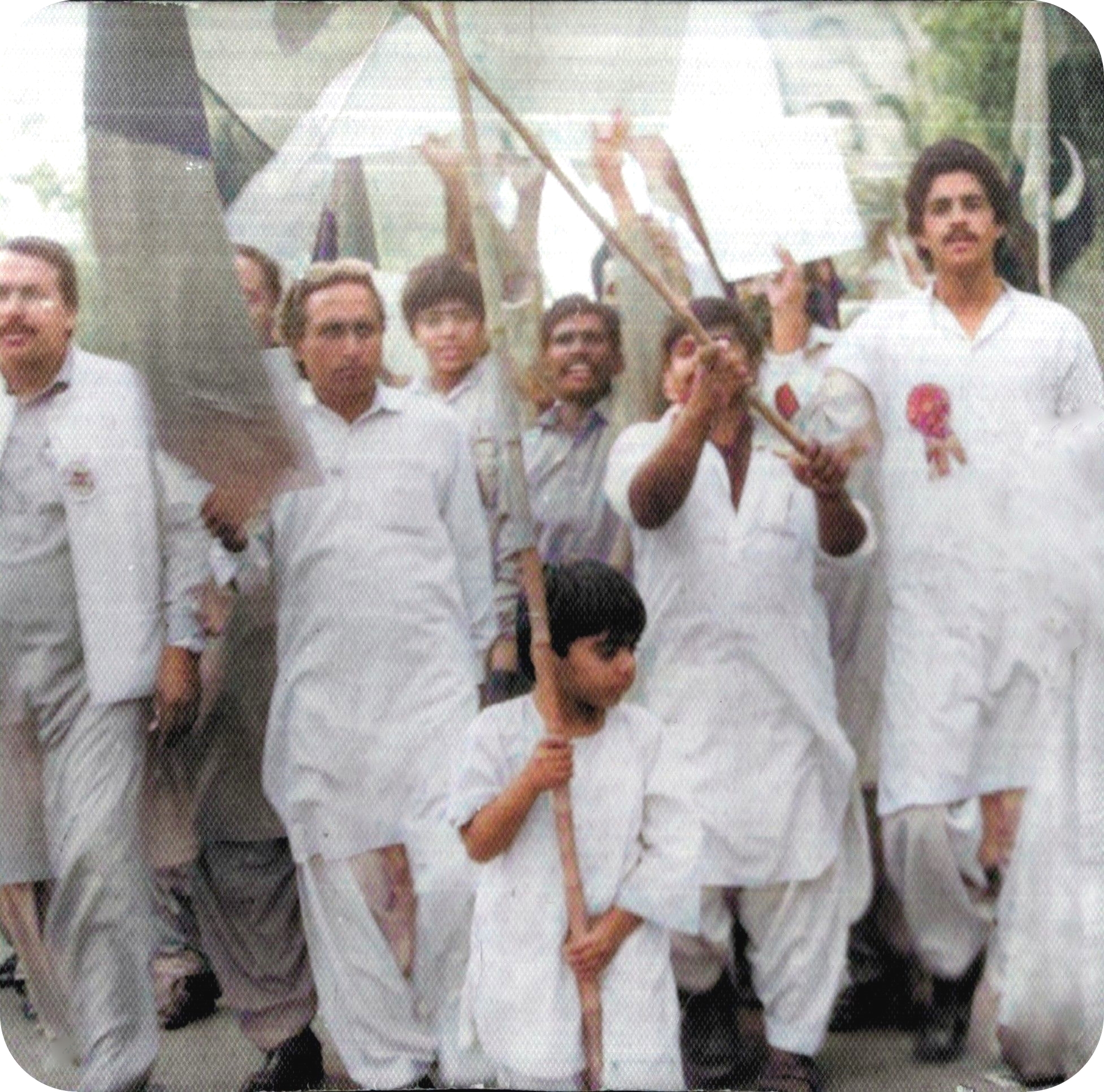
4 year old Fraz Wahlah, with his father MS Wahlah behind him, holding Peoples Party flag & leading an MRD protest against General Zia's martial law shortly before his arrest making him youngest prisoner of the military dictator.

In 1980, PPP persuasively reached out to left-wing organisations in the country and started its political function after calling for the end of the military regime of President Zia-ul-Haq. Negotiations between PPP leaders and the political parties that had formed the Pakistan National Alliance in 1977 started in October 1980. They led to the formation of the MRD on 6 February 1981, at 70 Clifton, the Bhuttos' family house in Karachi. The alliance was dissolved on 24 August 1988. The alliance launched a struggle against the regime of Zia ul-Haq: in the first weeks, 1999 people were arrested, 189 killed and 126 injured.

The movement is generally thought of as two separate outburst, one in August and September 1983, and one in 1986. It was particularly strong in rural Sindh, where it was fuelled by people's resentment against the state, and it finally took 3 army divisions and helicopters to bring the uprising down.

Military force and repression was used against agitators and the movement was crushed. Despite its set backs, the MRD was significant for mounting a political pressure on President Zia to hold the elections. Convinced that party-based elections would not bring the "positive results" he had been talking of, he decided to hold non-party elections in 1985. But before doing so, he secured his election as president through a referendum.

In 1984, Benazir Bhutto and the MRD notably boycotted the 1984 presidential referendum, following making another call for boycotting the 1985 general elections, to be held under President Zia-ul-Haq. Successfully boycotting the 1984 referendum and 1985 election, proved to be a serious miscalculation despite confident of enjoying huge popular support. Contrary to MRD's expectations, the voters turned to these polls were in large numbers. The MRD soon realised that it had miscalculated badly, that it should have fought the elections on Zia's terms.

The PML, JeI, and MQM were the only parties which contested in the election, while the MRD boycotted the election. To a greater extent, the MRD's was hailing from Sindh where the left-wing orientation was much stronger than any other provinces of the country. The Communist Party, with the support from USSR, began its political operations in Sindh and ultimately calling for civil disobedience against the military regime. In response, the communist party leader, Jam Saqi, was brought to a secret trial in Sindh High Court, later directed to military courts. The MRD had united the left-wing mass of the country and the most prominent leaders of the MRD were: Nusrat Bhutto, her daughter Benazir Bhutto, Rasool Bux Palijo, Abdul Wali Khan, Jam Saqi, Syed Muhammad Kaswar Gardezi, Syed Kabir Ali Wasti among others. Thousands of the activists were jailed across the country especially in Sindh.

=== MRD Composition ===
MRD Convergence
Political parties	Presiding leadership	Position	Colour	Fate
Qaumi Awami Tehreek (QAT)	Rasool Bux Palijo and Fazil Rahu	Left-wing; Far left		Public collapse in 1991
Pakistan Peoples Party (PPP)	Nusrat Bhutto and Benazir Bhutto	Centre-left		Formed Government in 1988
Awami National Party (ANP)	Wali Khan	Left to Centre-left		In alliance with PPP in 1988
Jamiat Ulema-e-Islam (F) (JUI(F))	Maulana Fazal-ur-Rehman	Right-wing to Far-right		In alliance with PPP in 1988
Communist Party of Pakistan (CPP)	Jam Saqi and Nazeer Abbasi	Far left		Public collapse in 1991

Pakistan Muslim League Qasim Group (CPP)|| Syed Kabir Ali Wasti || centre Left || #CE2029 || Dissolved in PML Quaid e Azm |}

== Responses ==
=== Controversy regarding the Foreign support ===
The foreign policy historian of Pakistan noted that MRD's one of the two leading parties, ANP and CPP, had gained popular and financial support from the Soviet Union in the 1980s. Holding a press conference in 1983, President Zia-ul-Haq portrayed the MRD as an Indian-backed conspiracy to destabilise Pakistan was without merit, but gained credence among some Pakistanis when Indian Prime Minister Indira Gandhi endorsed the movement in an address to the lower house of the Indian parliament.

Despite charges to the contrary, the MRD in Sindh was not attempting to secede from Pakistan but instead was focused on the restoration of the constitution. President Zia's interior secretary, Roedad Khan, later wrote that the regime was able to manipulate this perception to their advantage and prevent the MRD from gaining greater appeal on a nationwide level.

=== Aftermath of USSR Collapse ===
In 1980, PPP persuasively reached out to left-wing organisations in the country and started its political function after calling for the end of military regime of President Zia-ul-Haq. Negotiations between PPP leaders and the political parties that had formed the Pakistan National Alliance in 1977 started in October 1980. They led to the formation of the MRD on 6 February 1981, at 70 Clifton, the Bhuttos' family house in Karachi. The alliance was dissolved on 24 August 1988. The alliance launched a struggle against the regime of Zia ul-Haq: in the first weeks, 1999 people were arrested, 189 killed and 126 injured.

The movement is generally thought of as two separate outburst, one in August and September 1983, and one in 1986. It was particularly strong in rural Sindh, where it was fuelled by people's resentment against the state, and it finally took 3 army divisions and helicopters to bring the uprising down.

== Links ==
- MRD Movement
