= National Students Federation =

Students federation in Pakistan

- Abbreviation: NSF
- Leader: Meraj Muhammad Khan (Maoist-Meraj Faction) Rasheed Kazmi (Marxist-Kazmi Faction)
- Preceded by: Democratic Students Federation
- Ideology: Left-wing politics Marxism; Maoism

Party flag

Website
- Official website of Maoist-Meraj Faction

The National Students Federation (NSF) is a left-wing student organization in Pakistan. It was founded in 1956 as the successor to the Democratic Students Federation (DSF), which had been banned for its alleged ties to the Communist Party of Pakistan.

Initially dominated by Marxist currents, the NSF later split into Marxist and Maoist factions during the 1960s.

== History ==
The NSF was created after the banning of its predecessor DSF in 1954. The DSF had led several mass student protests in Karachi and was accused of maintaining links with the Communist Party, leading to its dissolution by the state. The new NSF adopted a broadly leftist line, with influence from both Soviet-aligned and Chinese communism.

=== Role in 1968–69 student movement ===
In October 1968, the NSF organized "Demands Week" demonstrations against the government of President Ayub Khan, in collaboration with trade unions, the Awami League, and the Pakistan Peoples Party (PPP).

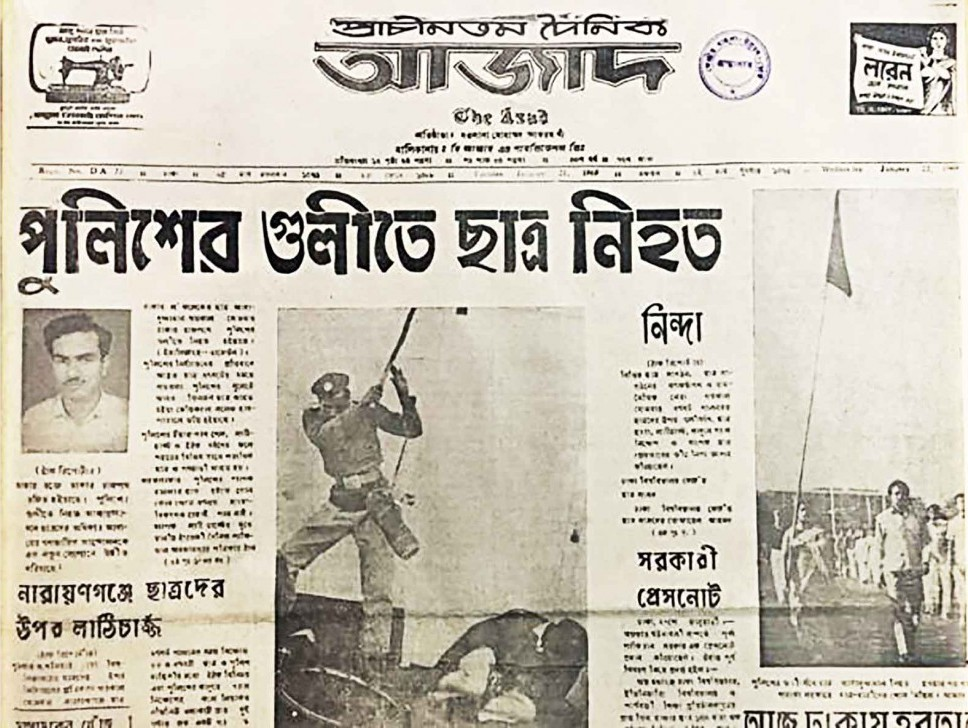
A newspaper highlighting student uprising in East Pakistan (Bengal)

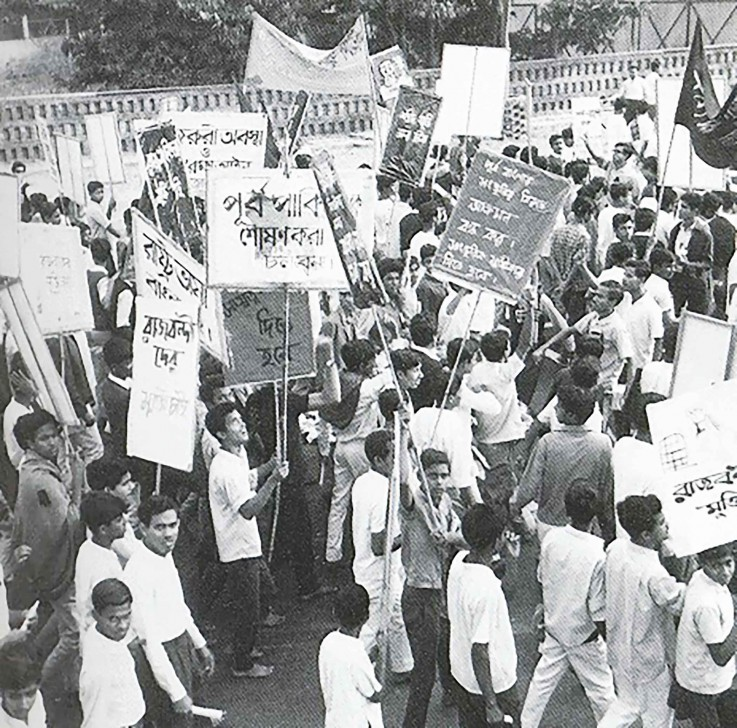
A student procession at Dhaka University campus during the mass uprising of 1969

The first demonstration took place on 7 October 1968 in Karachi, outside the Board of Secondary Education office. The movement spread after the arrest of students returning from Landi Kotal on smuggling charges. In Rawalpindi, protests intensified following the police shooting of Abdul Hameed, a student at Rawalpindi Polytechnic College. His death acted as a catalyst, sparking further unrest.

By early 1969, widespread strikes and protests had paralyzed much of the country. In his own memoirs, Ayub Khan described the seriousness of the situation, noting that even dockworkers in Karachi had refused to load ships. Facing nationwide agitation, Ayub resigned on 25 March 1969.

== Splits and political alignments ==
In 1965, the NSF split into two factions, commonly known as the "Meraj group" (led by Meraj Muhammad Khan) and the "Kazmi group" (led by Rasheed Kazmi). Both maintained ties with the Pakistan Peoples Party, but differed in their ideological orientation—the Meraj group leaned toward Maoism and mass mobilization, while the Kazmi group was closer to pro-Soviet currents.

Although NSF initially allied with the PPP—Meraj Muhammad Khan later served as a federal minister under Prime Minister Zulfikar Ali Bhutto—tensions grew as Bhutto distanced himself from socialist policies. NSF leaders accused him of abandoning radical reforms and pursuing ethnic-based politics, leading to the end of their alliance.

== Suppression and decline ==
During the regime of General Zia-ul-Haq, student union elections were banned in 1984, effectively dismantling left-wing student organizations including NSF. Right-wing groups such as the Islami Jamiat-e-Talaba gained prominence during this period, benefiting from popular support.

== Re-emergence ==
The NSF began reorganizing in 2007, alongside the People’s Democratic Front.

== Legacy ==
Despite decades of decline, the NSF remains a historical symbol of student activism in Pakistan. Its role in the downfall of Ayub Khan and in shaping leftist student politics is widely acknowledged.
