= 2013 Pakistani general election =

- 11 May 2013

All 342 seats in the National Assembly 172 seats needed for a majority
- Turnout: 55.02% (▲10.68pp)
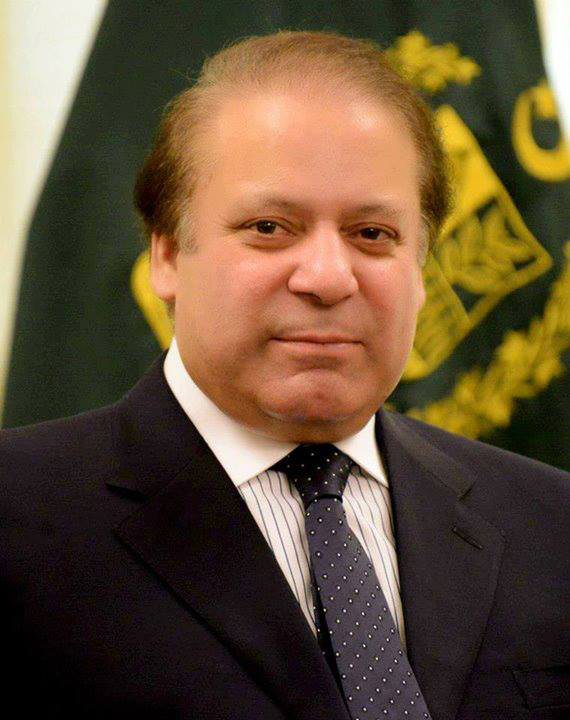

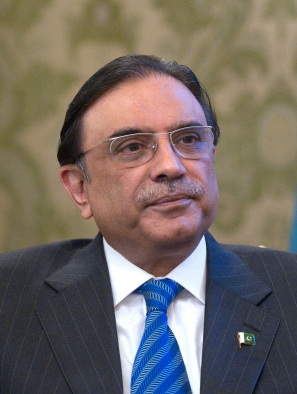

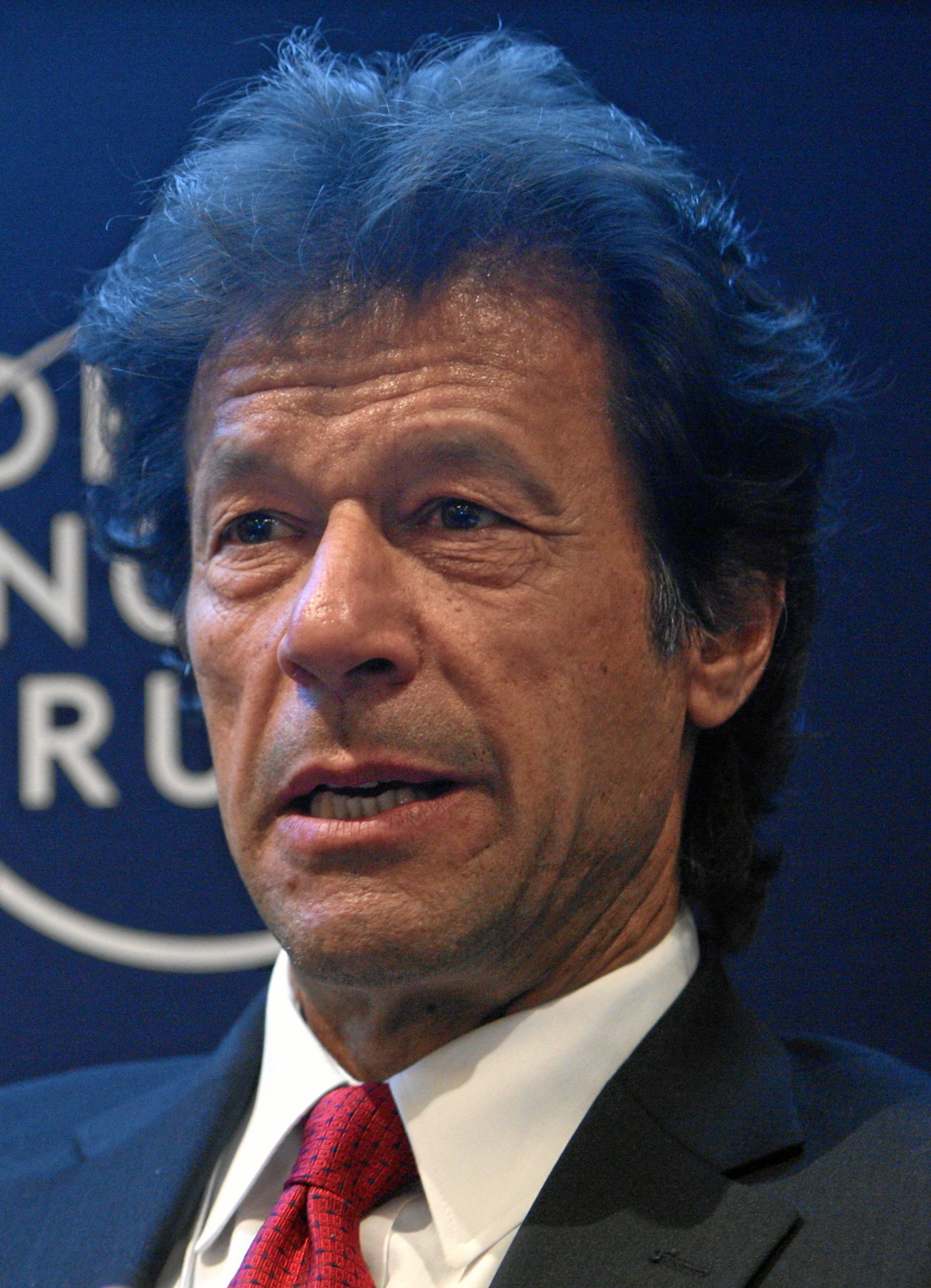
	First party	Second party	Third party
Leader	Nawaz Sharif	Asif Ali Zardari	Imran Khan
Party	PML(N)	PPP	PTI
Last election	89 seats	118 seats	Boycotted
Seats won	166	42	35
Seat change	▲77	▼76	New
Popular vote	14,874,104	6,911,218	7,679,954
Percentage	32.77%	15.23%	16.92%
Swing	▲13.12pp	▼15.47pp	New
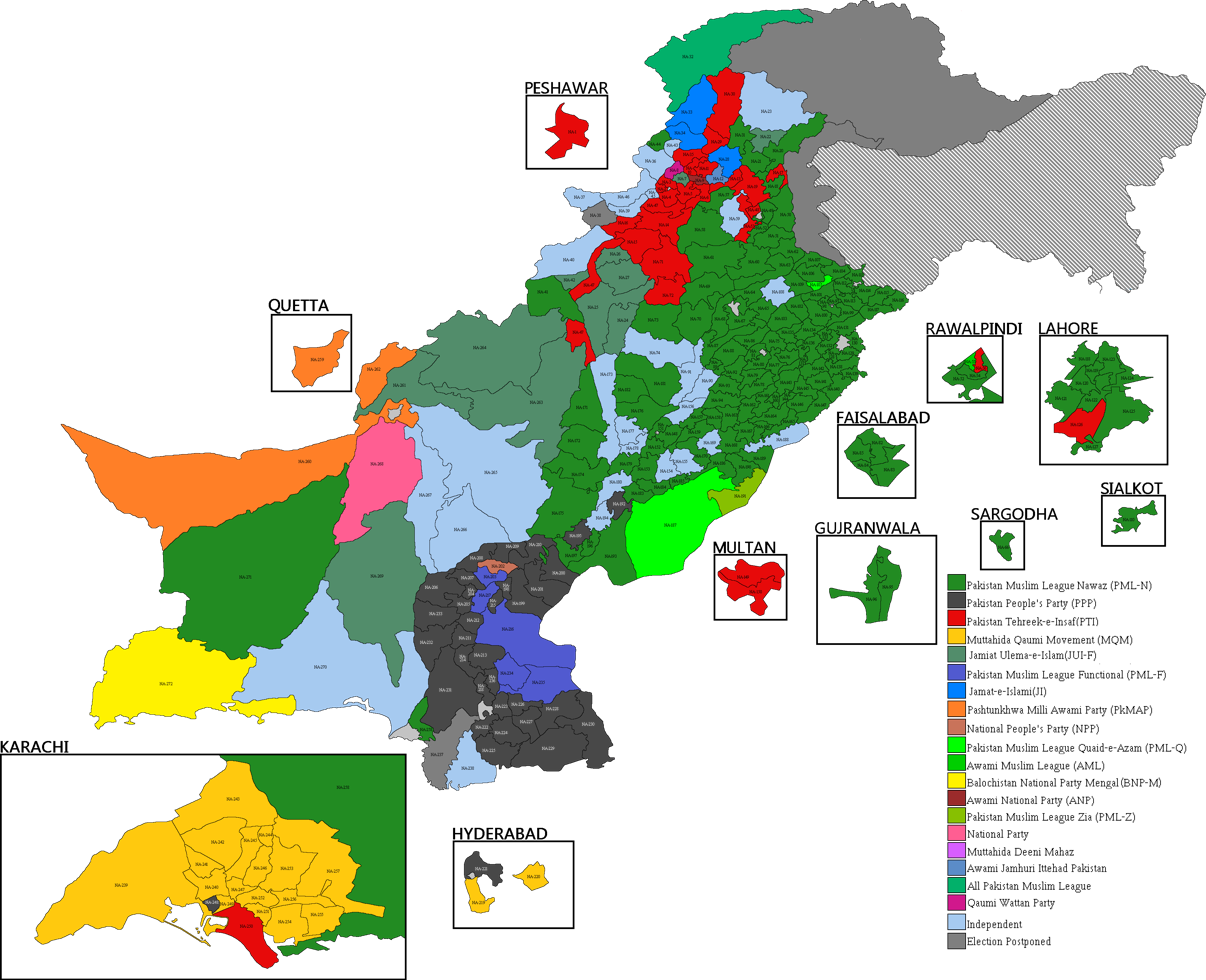
- Results by constituency
Prime Minister before election
Raja Pervez Ashraf
PPP
Subsequent Prime Minister
Nawaz Sharif
PML(N)

General elections were held in Pakistan on Saturday 11 May 2013 to elect the members of the 14th National Assembly and the four Provincial Assemblies. The three major parties were the Pakistan Muslim League (N) (PML-N) led by Nawaz Sharif, the Pakistan People's Party (PPP) led by President Asif Ali Zardari and the Pakistan Tehreek-e-Insaf (PTI) led by Imran Khan. Prior to the elections, the ruling PPP formed an alliance with the Pakistan Muslim League (Q) and Awami National Party, while the main opposition party, the PML-N allied with the Pakistan Muslim League (F) and Baloch parties. The PTI led by cricketer-turned-politician Imran Khan, also emerged as a key-player.

The result was a hung parliament, with the PML-N receiving the most votes and winning the most seats, but falling six seats short of a majority. However, following the elections, 19 independent MPs joined the PML-N, allowing it to form a government alone with Nawaz Sharif as new Prime Minister.

In the provincial elections, the PPP was able to defend its majority in Sindh. The PTI won the most seats in Khyber Pakhtunkhwa, the first time it had gained control of a province. The PML-N emerged as the largest party in Punjab and Balochistan.

The elections were the first civilian transfer of power following the successful completion of a five-year term by a democratically elected government.

== Background ==
According to the constitution general elections are to be held at an interval of five years or whenever parliament is dissolved by the President. Upon dissolution of the National Assembly (a lower house of the Parliament), the elections are to be held within a period of sixty days immediately under a caretaker set–up. The previous elections were held in February 2008 and its term naturally expired in February 2013.

In mid-January 2013, Sufi cleric and politician Dr. Tahir-ul-Qadri led a Long March from Lahore to Islamabad, which is over 350 km, demanding the electoral reforms, the quick dissolution of the National Assembly and a precise date for the election. The march attracted about ~50,000 participants from across Pakistan and ended peacefully. However, this appeared to have little impact on the PPP government who continued on as per normal, and were seemingly following their plan as to when to announce elections. The anti-corruption activism led by Imran Khan gathered momentum and political interests.

In the run up to the elections, a US Congressional report provided a brief overview of the PPP government between 2008 and 2013. The annual report included the input of 16 US intelligence agencies, including the CIA, which pointed the policies and performances of the PPP government during their five-year term. The report wanted that "Economically, trouble looms. Pakistan, with its small tax base, poor system of tax collection, and reliance on foreign aid, faces no real prospects for sustainable economic growth. The government has been unwilling to address economic problems that continue to constrain economic growth. The PPP government has made no real effort to persuade its disparate coalition members to accept much-needed monetary policy and tax reforms, because members are simply focused on retaining their seats in the upcoming elections."

=== Process ===
With assistance from the International Foundation for Electoral Systems, the Election Commission of Pakistan (ECP)announced the printing of computerised electoral rolls, the first of its kind database which resulted in the elimination of 35 million bogus voters off the list.

=== Schedule ===
- 1 August 2012: The Election Commission of Pakistan announces 2013 general elections would be held on the basis of same old constituencies.
- December 2012: The Supreme Court of Pakistan orders delimitation of constituencies and door-to-door verification of voters with the help of Pakistan Army in Karachi.
- 17 January 2013: The Election Commission of Pakistan (ECP) starts door-to-door verification of voters list.
- 3 February 2013: President Asif Ali Zardari stated he would announce the election date between 8 and 14 March 2013.
- 31 March 2013: Last date to submit the candidates' papers.

=== Caretaker government ===
Following the recommendations in Article 224 (Clauses 1A-1B) of the constitution of Pakistan, there arose a need to form a caretaker government to operate in the interim period between the normal dissolution of parliament, facilitating the election process, until a new government was formed after the election results were known. To this effect, prime minister Pervez Ashraf wrote a letter to the opposition leader Nisar Ali Khan, requesting him to propose names of persons for appointment as the caretaker prime minister.

The Pakistan Muslim League (N) (PML-N), Jamaat-e-Islami Pakistan (JI), Pakistan Tehrik-i-Insaaf (PTI) and Jamiat Ulema-i-Islam (JUI-F) all agreed on the name of retired senior justice Nasir Aslam Zahid as the caretaker PM until the elections take place. After a failure to achieve a consensus between the PPP government and the opposition, the matter was forwarded to a parliamentary committee of four members from both the government and the opposition.

Under the provision of Article 224-A (Clause 3) of the constitution, the Election Commission announced the appointment of retired Federal Shariat Court chief justice Mir Hazar Khan Khoso on 24 March 2013 in a press conference held by chief election commissioner Fakhruddin G Ebrahim. Consequently, Khoso was sworn into office as the caretaker prime minister on 25 March 2013, while his caretaker federal cabinet was sworn into office on 2 April 2013.

== Registered voters ==
Following is the final list of registered voters in each district of Pakistan who are eligible to cast their vote.

- The total number of registered voters for the election were 76,194,802.
- The province of Punjab had the highest number of registered voters.
- In cities, five districts of Karachi which form the city of Karachi had a total of 7,171,237 registered voters; more than total voters of the province of Balochistan and more than any other city or district in Pakistan.
- In Balochistan, due to sparse population, some National Assembly seats were shared by two or three districts.

Province	District	No. of Voters	Seat No
Balochistan	Awaran	56,387	NA-270
Balochistan	Barkhan	55,327	NA-263
Balochistan	Chagai	66,836	NA-260
Balochistan	Dera Bugti	63,953	NA-265
Balochistan	Gwadar	93,650	NA-272
Balochistan	Harnai	33,140	NA-265
Balochistan	Jaffarabad	247,316	NA-266
Balochistan	Jhal Magsi	44,533	NA-267
Balochistan	Kachhi (Bolan)	103,108	NA-267
Balochistan	Kalat	104,445	NA-268
Balochistan	Kech	173,972	NA-272
Balochistan	Kharan	45,176	NA-271
Balochistan	Khuzdar	165,593	NA-269
Balochistan	Killa Abdullah	184,832	NA-262
Balochistan	Killa Saifullah	88,424	NA-264
Balochistan	Kohlu	38,624	NA-265
Balochistan	Lasbela	182,697	NA-270
Balochistan	Loralai	107,028	NA-263
Balochistan	Mastung	80,118	NA-268
Balochistan	Musakhel	51,864	NA-263
Balochistan	Nasirabad	162,349	NA-266
Balochistan	Nushki	61,878	NA-260
Balochistan	Panjgur	74,751	NA-271
Balochistan	Pishin	196,859	NA-261
Balochistan	Quetta	559,939	NA-259
Balochistan	Sherani	31,837	NA-264
Balochistan	Sibi	75,832	NA-265
Balochistan	Washuk	38,171	NA-271
Balochistan	Zhob	96,278	NA-264
Balochistan	Ziarat	51,742	NA-261
BALOCHISTAN	TOTAL	3,336,659	NA-259 to NA-272
FATA	Bajaur Agency	353,554	NA-43, NA-44
FATA	F.R. Bannu	9,482	NA-47
FATA	F.R. D. I. Khan	22,269	NA-47
FATA	F.R. Kohat	41,070	NA-47
FATA	F.R. Lakki Marwat	9,939	NA-47
FATA	F.R. Peshawar	23,371	NA-47
FATA	F.R. Tank	15,581	NA-47
FATA	Khyber Agency	336,763	NA-45, NA-46
FATA	Kurram Agency	262,021	NA-37, NA-38
FATA	Mohmand Agency	177,244	NA-36
FATA	North Waziristan Agency	160,666	NA-40
FATA	Orakzai Agency	125,687	NA-39
FATA	South Waziristan Agency	200,666	NA-41, NA-42
FATA	TOTAL	1,738,313	NA-36 to NA-47
Federal Area	Islamabad	625,964	NA-48, NA-49
Khyber Pakhtunkhwa	Abbottabad	675,188	NA-17, NA-18
Khyber Pakhtunkhwa	Bannu	444,059	NA-26
Khyber Pakhtunkhwa	Batagram	204,980	NA-22
Khyber Pakhtunkhwa	Buner	360,019	NA-28
Khyber Pakhtunkhwa	Charsadda	704,680	NA-7, NA-8
Khyber Pakhtunkhwa	Chitral	206,909	NA-32
Khyber Pakhtunkhwa	D. I. Khan	606,959	NA-24
Khyber Pakhtunkhwa	Hangu	214,703	NA-16
Khyber Pakhtunkhwa	Haripur	531,866	NA-19
Khyber Pakhtunkhwa	Karak	315,087	NA-15
Khyber Pakhtunkhwa	Kohat	409,372	NA-14
Khyber Pakhtunkhwa	Kohistan	127,015	NA-23
Khyber Pakhtunkhwa	Lakki Marwat	330,274	NA-27
Khyber Pakhtunkhwa	Lower Dir	541,565	NA-34
Khyber Pakhtunkhwa	Malakand	311,172	NA-35
Khyber Pakhtunkhwa	Mansehra	742,674	NA-20
Khyber Pakhtunkhwa	Mardan	987,122	NA-9, NA-10, NA-11
Khyber Pakhtunkhwa	Nowshera	619,914	NA-5, NA-6
Khyber Pakhtunkhwa	Peshawar	1,393,144	NA-1, NA-2, NA-3, NA-4
Khyber Pakhtunkhwa	Shangla	296,722	NA-31
Khyber Pakhtunkhwa	Swabi	714,454	NA-12, NA-13
Khyber Pakhtunkhwa	Swat	981,823	NA-29, NA-30
Khyber Pakhtunkhwa	Tank	150,585	NA-25
Khyber Pakhtunkhwa	Tor Ghar	64,867	NA-21
Khyber Pakhtunkhwa	Upper Dir	331,004	NA-33
KHYBER PAKHTUNKHWA	TOTAL	12,266,157	NA-1 to NA-35
Punjab	Attock	1,022,180	NA-57, NA-58, NA-59
Punjab	Bahawalnagar	1,264,077	NA-188, NA-189, NA-190, NA-191
Punjab	Bahawalpur	1,522,061	NA-183, NA-184, NA-185, NA-186, NA-187
Punjab	Bhakkar	711,837	NA-73, NA-74
Punjab	Chakwal	929,747	NA-60, NA-61
Punjab	Chiniot	602,290	NA-86, NA-87, NA-88
Punjab	Dera Ghazi Khan	1,052,720	NA-171, NA-172, NA-173
Punjab	Faisalabad	3,622,748	NA-75, NA-76, NA-77, NA-78, NA-79, NA-80, NA-81, NA-82, NA-83, NA-84, NA-85
Punjab	Gujranwala	2,273,141	NA-95, NA-96, NA-97, NA-98, NA-99, NA-100, NA-101
Punjab	Gujrat	1,581,402	NA-104, NA-105, NA-106, NA-107
Punjab	Hafizabad	543,646	NA-102, NA-103
Punjab	Jhang	1,145,415	NA-89, NA-90, NA-91
Punjab	Jhelum	783,571	NA-62, NA-63
Punjab	Kasur	1,463,575	NA-138, NA-139, NA-140, NA-141, NA-142
Punjab	Khanewal	1,301,926	NA-156, NA-157, NA-158, NA-159
Punjab	Khushab	680,471	NA-69, NA-70
Punjab	Lahore	4,410,095	NA-118, NA-119, NA-120, NA-121, NA-122, NA-123, NA-124, NA-125, NA-126, NA-127, NA-128, NA-129, NA-130
Punjab	Layyah	736,509	NA-181, NA-182
Punjab	Lodhran	727,177	NA-154, NA-155
Punjab	Mandi Bahauddin	815,154	NA-108, NA-109
Punjab	Mianwali	757,191	NA-71, NA-72
Punjab	Multan	2,110,177	NA-148, NA-149, NA-150, NA-151, NA-152, NA-153
Punjab	Muzaffargarh	1,681,436	NA-176, NA-177, NA-178, NA-179, NA-180
Punjab	Nankana Sahib	623,625	NA-135, NA-136, NA-137
Punjab	Narowal	792,379	NA-115, NA-116, NA-117
Punjab	Okara	1,396,811	NA-143, NA-144, NA-145, NA-146, NA-147
Punjab	Pakpattan	823,478	NA-164, NA-165, NA-166
Punjab	Rahim Yar Khan	1,904,615	NA-192, NA-193, NA-194, NA-195, NA-196, NA-197
Punjab	Rajanpur	724,286	NA-174, NA-175
Punjab	Rawalpindi	2,645,608	NA-50, NA-51, NA-52, NA-53, NA-54, NA-55, NA-56
Punjab	Sahiwal	1,190,424	NA-160, NA-161, NA-162, NA-163
Punjab	Sargodha	1,861,804	NA-64, NA-65, NA-66, NA-67, NA-68
Punjab	Sheikhupura	1,341,341	NA-131, NA-132, NA-133, NA-134
Punjab	Sialkot	1,841,347	NA-110, NA-111, NA-112, NA-113, NA-114
Punjab	Toba Tek Singh	1,089,508	NA-92, NA-93, NA-94
Punjab	Vehari	1,285,562	NA-167, NA-168, NA-169, NA-170
PUNJAB	TOTAL	49,259,334	NA-50 to NA-197
Sindh	Badin	639,314	NA-224, NA-225
Sindh	Dadu	609,609	NA-231, NA-232, NA-233
Sindh	Ghotki	568,065	NA-200, NA-201
Sindh	Hyderabad	923,140	NA-218, NA-219, NA-220, NA-221
Sindh	Jacobabad	394,557	NA-208, NA-209, NA-210
Sindh	Jamshoro	369,424	NA-231
Sindh	Kambar-Shahdadkot	508,062	NA-206
Sindh	Karachi Central	1,632,487	NA-244, NA-245, NA-246, NA-247
Sindh	Karachi East	2,093,898	NA-253, NA-254, NA-255, NA-256
Sindh	Karachi South	1,131,376	NA-248, NA-249, NA-250, NA-251, NA-252
Sindh	Karachi West	1,493,055	NA-239, NA-240, NA-241, NA-242, NA-243
Sindh	Karachi Malir	820,421	NA-257, NA-258
Sindh	Kashmore	353,616	NA-210
Sindh	Khairpur	838,502	NA-215, NA-216, NA-217
Sindh	Larkana	585,519	NA-204, NA-205, NA-207
Sindh	Matiari	300,486	NA-223
Sindh	Mirpur Khas	585,262	NA-226, NA-227
Sindh	Naushahro Feroze	600,090	NA-211, NA-212
Sindh	Sanghar	793,397	NA-234, NA-235, NA-236
Sindh	Shaheed Benazirabad	668,193	NA-213, NA-214
Sindh	Shikarpur	488,878	NA-202, NA-203
Sindh	Sukkur	527,635	NA-198, NA-199
Sindh	Tando Allahyar	286,956	NA-223
Sindh	Tando Muhammad Khan	230,554	NA-222
Sindh	Tharparkar	471,831	NA-229, NA-230
Sindh	Thatta	663,543	NA-237, NA-238
Sindh	Umerkot	385,505	NA-228
SINDH	TOTAL	18,963,375	NA-198 to NA-258
PAKISTAN	TOTAL	0	

== Campaign ==
Party leader	Most recent position of party leader	Seats won	Popular vote	Status after election
Nawaz Sharif	Prime Minister of Pakistan (November 1990 to July 1993, February 1997 to October 1999)	125	14,794,188	In Government
Asif Ali Zardari	11th President of Pakistan (2008–2013)	31	6,822,958	In Opposition
Imran Khan	Chairman of Pakistan Tehreek-e-Insaf (1995–2023)	27	7,563,504	In Opposition

With the announcement of the care-taker government, campaigning from parties—including the PPP, PML (N) and PTI—started as early as 27 March, six weeks ahead of the 11 May election date. Observers noted that different parties stressed on different interest groups – PTI on the disaffected youth, PML-N on the centre-right constituency, PPP on liberal classes and rural Sindhis, and MQM on Karachi-based muhajirs. Power shortages were another issue in the election campaign.

=== Pakistan Peoples Party ===
The PPP is a socialist party, advocating for Social democracy and Marxist economics.

Founded in 1968, the Pakistan Peoples Party (PPP) is a centre-left and left oriented party, with a mainstream agenda of promoting socialist economics and social justice. The PPP announced that Zardari would be its candidate for the next Prime Minister, though Bilawal Zardari was still too young to become prime minister. Article 62 of the Constitution clearly states that the Prime Minister must be a person who is "not less than twenty-five years of age and is enrolled as a voter in any electoral roll for election to the seat". Zardari was not 25 until September 2013. On 5 May 2013, it was revealed that Zardari had left Pakistan for Dubai and would not be present at all on election day. He unexpectedly left the country and would not be addressing any party rallies or meetings. The PPP also announced that he would not return until after the elections are over.

The PPP's campaign was led by Amin Fahim, accompanied by notable leftist activists such as Taj Haider, Aitzaz Ahsan, Raza Rabbani, and Yousaf Gillani. The PPP ran two different political programmes during the election campaign: "Massawat" (lit. Egalitarianism) and "People's Employment Programme" for the youth voters, and also its vintage "Roti Kapda Aur Makaan (lit. Bread, Cloth, House) slogan. The PPP highlighted its implementation of the nationalization and welfare programs that were launched in 2008. In addition, the PPP greatly supported awareness of industrial and labor rights, importance of higher education in the country, promotion of social economics, a foreign policy of building relations with Russia and Eastern Europe, counterterrorism legislation, efforts to reduce gas shortages in the country. Generally, the PPP's main focused was on gathering its support from Sindh. In a critical editorial in the English-language newspaper, The Nation, the PPP neglected to highlight the prevailing issue of energy conservation to reduce the repeated cycle of loadshedding in the country.

Soon after the PM's last address on 16 March 2013, TV carried live broadcasts from the streets of Lahore and Karachi, where the public mood was one of anger over corruption, the bad economy, and faulty public services. The reaction of political analysts was mixed, with many holding massive corruption and nepotism as the reasons for the government's perceived failures. Even in his televised address, while trumpeting the occasion, PM Raja P Ashraf quietly conceded that his government had also been a source of disappointment for many. Public resentment had been fed by an endless list of problems: enduring power shortages [up to 18 hours a day at the peak of summer]; the failure to curb terrorist attacks, protect religious minorities and formulate a coherent anti-terrorism strategy; slow and weak response to the floods; sluggish economic growth, a bloated public sector, cresting inflation; and tales of legendary corruption, carving out private fortunes from a treasury to which they scandalously paid little in tax. Many Pakistanis, particularly among the urban middle classes, were looking to the next elections with relief.

In Karachi and other parts of the country, the PPP also maintained a New Left alliance with the ANP, MQM, and Communist Party against the conservative parties in Sindh.

=== Pakistan Muslim League Noon ===
The Pakistan Muslim League, a centre-right conservative party, began its campaign on terminating the energy conservation crises, and also issues involving national security, economic development, higher education, immigration, and taxation reforms. The campaign was led by Nawaz Sharif, who emphasis the success of the privatisation to alleviate youth employment and small businesses, introducing policies for the environmental preservation, building motorways, counterterrorism legislation, economic liberalisation, improvement of the public transportation in all over the country, and then the decision of authorising the nuclear-testing programme in 1998. Over several days, Sharif delivered speeches and visited in all over the country for the support, promising that: "Just like the nuclear blasts, conducted in our last tenure, made us an atomic power, an economic explosion in our next term will turn the country into a commercial powerhouse." Furthermore, the PML(N) indicated to bring a balance on civil-military relations with the military, through opening a source of political channel to resolve issues.

The PML(N) ran a political programme which was termed as "Ilmi aur Maashi Dhamaka" (lit. Education and Economic boom) at the public circles, and gained a lot of public support from all over the Punjab, and the financial support from the business community in Karachi, which proved to be a crucial factor in PML(N)'s efforts to gain majority in the elections. After delivering a victory speech in May 2013, Nawaz Sharif became Prime Minister for a third term on 5 June 2013 after receiving vote of confidence in the Parliament. He received 244 votes in the 342-seat parliament. The PML(N) was generally supported by PML(F) against the PPP in Sindh and BNP in Balochistan, also against the PPP. Terming it as "EEE programme" for Education, Energy, Economy, the PML(N) popularise its slogan "Stronger Economy–Strong Pakistan", which was released in 2012.

Addressing to the national via news channels representatives, the PML(N) debated that aside from balancing the energy conservation, ending stagflation as well inflation, and resolving the issues relating to counter-terrorism and national security, its quick economic recovery programmes is also aimed to increase the expenditure on education, health, food security, and "non-pension" social security from the annual GDP by 2018, as part of the policy measurement programmes.

=== Pakistan Tehreek-e-Insaf ===
The Pakistan Tehreek-e-Insaf (PTI) is a centrist, welfarist, and nationalist political party a mainstream political programme of supporting the "Third Way" and "welfarism".

In the midst of election campaign, the PTI's chairman, Imran Khan, called for an inter-party elections for the leadership of the PTI. Many renowned individuals were defeated in the intra-party elections, such as Arif Alvi who was replaced by Pervez Khattak as secretary-general and Ejaz Chaudhary who defeated Ahsan Rasheed. Imran informed the media that no-one from his party will be eligible to hold the post of the party chairman for more than two terms. Motives behind this inter-party elections were to will ultimately finish off the "dynasty-type, family limited companies politics" from the country, as Imran Khan maintained.

The PTI rigorously campaigned on social awareness, social reforms, telecommunication, and the expansion of the e-government in all over the country. Other main points of PTI's campaign was to end the role of country in the war on terrorism and to regulate private schools' fees structure with the quality of education they provide. The PTI targeted the left-wing policies of PPP and the corruption that took place in state-owned enterprises after underwent through the nationalisation programme, started in 2008 by the PPP.

During a campaign rally in Lahore, Imran fell 14 ft as he was stepping off an improvised forklift. He was seen to be bleeding and unconscious with a gash on his head. He was then taken to Shaukat Khanum Memorial Hospital where Imran was treated for two fractures to his spinal column. During the election process, the PTI was also leading a religio-political alliance, consisting of Jamaat-e-Islami and the Shia minority MWM.

=== Pervez Musharraf ===
On 24 March 2013, former President Pervez Musharraf returned from self-imposed exile to lead the liberal APML and to run in the election despite threats from the far-right and extremist Tehrik-i-Taliban Pakistan (TTP) on his life, similar to the return of Benazir Bhutto, who was assassinated shortly after returning.

On immediate basis, Musharraf's candidature was rejected from his home town of Karachi on the grounds that he violated the Constitution and that he had sacked senior judges during his presidency. Electoral returning officer Ikramur Rehman upheld the objections by his rivals. The liberal PML(Q) official, Afzal Agha, said "this is a biased decision." He was also rejected from the Kasur– a rural town in Punjab. However, he was later approved in the Chitral, also a rural town in Khyber–Pathtunkwa. On 8 April 2013, the Supreme Court issued a summon to be appear over in the apex court to face charges of treason and barred him from leaving the country.

On 16 April, an appeal for his approval from Chitral decided by a court in the provincial capital of Peshawar in which he was barred on the grounds that he violated the constitution by imposing emergency rule in 2007. His lawyer said that he would appeal to the Supreme Court. He was also ordered to be kept under house arrest for two weeks. On 23 April, he appeared at a Rawalpindi court under tight security on charges relating to the assassination of Benazir Bhutto. On 25 April, he was formally arrested for the same charge. The Peshawar High Court then banned him for life from taking part in politics activities. Chief Justice Dost Mohammad Khan said: "The former dictator [Musharraf] had ordered senior judges and their families be put under house arrest and twice abrogated the country's constitution." In reaction to the ban, a party spokeswoman for the All Pakistan Muslim League said that it would boycott the election. He was granted US$20,000 bail on 20 May.

== Violence ==
=== Pre-election violence ===
The extremist terrorist organisation, the Tehrik-i-Taliban Pakistan (TTP), claimed the responsibility for two bombings at the offices of independent candidates on 28 April. In Kohat, the TTP bombed left-wing ANP's Nasir Khan Afridi's office which killed six and critically wounded others. In the suburbs of Peshawar, a device bomb at killed three people. The next day, at least eight people, including the son of Afghani cleric Qazi Amin Waqad, were killed and 45 others were wounded in a suicide attack in Peshawar. The bomb had targeted Sahibzada Anees, a senior city administrator, who had just passed the area. Hilal was a part of the Afghan High Peace Council and was organising a meeting of Afghan and Pakistani religious scholars to oppose militancy. All political parties condemned the attack. The same day, at a Karachi press conference the leaders of the left-wing parties– the PPP, MQM and ANP—said that the attacks would not stop them from participating in the election. ANP's Secretary-General, Bashir Jan, said that his party had previously made sacrifices in relations to the 2012 assassination of Bashir Bilour, the former party leader. His statement followed an explosion that wounded three children near the election office of Mohammad Ahmed Khan, the ANP candidate from Charsadda in Khyber-Pakhtunkhwa. On 2 May, a bomb exploded outside the MQM headquarters in which seven people were injured. On 4 May, at least three people were killed and 34 others were wounded when two bombs targeted the election office of the MQM in the Azeezabad area of Karachi.

In a rally in Kurram Valley, at least 15 people were dead and over 50 injured at a JUI(F) rally for candidates Munir Orakzai and Ain-u-Dun Shakir. The rally was part of the faction led by Fazal-ur-Rehman. The latter was slightly wounded. Armed skirmishes and tensions also flared near the Afghanistan–Pakistan border. On 9 May, the son of former prime minister Yousef Raza Gilani, Ali Haider Gilani, was abducted following a gunfight at a rally in Multan that killed his personal secretary.

=== Election day violence ===
Scattered gun and bomb attacks marred an otherwise celebratory day in a nation mired in economic crisis and locked in a fight with a virulent native Taliban insurgency. By the time polls closed in the evening, at least 20 people had died in attacks, the most serious targeting a pro-US political party in the southern port city of Karachi. The violence, which included blasts outside a political office in Karachi that left 10 dead, capped a bloody election season. More than 130 people have been killed in bombings and shootings over the campaign, prompting some to call this one of the deadliest votes in the country's history.

Several bombs were reportedly defused before voting began on Saturday morning, according to al-Jazeera. No one had so far taken the responsibility for the attacks, except for the initial two blasts in the coastal city of Karachi, claimed by TTP.

== Opinion polls ==
Pakistan Tehreek-e-Insaf to play important role in next government.

— Najam Sethi, 2013

Various polls were conducted by different organisations, all of which show inconsistencies and different results.

In March 2013, a survey by Heinrich Böll Foundation showed that 29% of the people surveyed would support the Pakistan Peoples Party. As the highest nummain opposition party, 25% would support the Pakistan Muslim League (N), led by former prime minister Nawaz Sharif. Another 20% supported the Pakistan Tehreek-e-Insaf (PTI) led by former cricketer Imran Khan.

According to a survey conducted by Gallup Pakistan and PILDAT the Pakistan Muslim League topped the list on voting intention score in Punjab, followed by the PPP and the PTI respectively. The February 2013 political forecast is based on a nationwide poll of approximately 9,660 voters in 300 villages and urban localities. The voting intention score of PML-N stands at 63% in North and Central Punjab, 69% in Western Punjab and 49% in Southern Punjab, shows the survey. According to the consolidated findings of two nationwide polls on voting intentions, conducted by IRI and Gallup Pakistan respectively during past three months, the front runner in Pakistan's elections scheduled in mid-2013 is the PML-N. The PTI, according to the survey, is making deep inroads in Khyber-Pakhtunkhwa where it has surpassed every other player by a 30% score.

Pakistan Peoples Party to emerge victorious on basis of performance.

— Qamar Zaman Kaira, 2013

Senior political analyst, Najam Sethi said, Nawaz Sharif held public meetings and rallies in every nook and corner of the country while Shahbaz Sharif completed development projects in Punjab which attracted politicians from the other parties. Sethi said that the 3% raise in the popularity graph of the PPP was made possible due to Asif Ali Zardari's efforts who gathered many such politicians as used to oppose him. He said the popularity of both the parties increased due to the revival of the traditional politics and the same was the cause of decrease in popularity of unorthodox politicians like Imran Khan. However, Imran Khan's next public meetings would help him a lot, Sethi predicted, saying that the PTI leader's graph would go up after public rallies in Lahore and Peshawar and the party would play an important role in formation of the next government.

=== Support based on generation gap ===
The survey's findings indicate that the PTI's support is derived from all age groups – 22.9 per cent of those between 18 and 35 years, 18.6 per cent of those between 36 and 50 years, 18.4 per cent of those between 51 and 70 years and 7.7 of those above 70 years support the PTI, dispelling the notion that its vote bank is rooted in the younger generation. The highest proportion of those aged between 36 and 50 years (32.5 per cent) indicate a preference for the PPP. Similarly, 46.2 per cent of those aged over 70 expressed a preference for the PML(N). Compared with respondents' voting histories, the PML(N)'s vote bank appears to have remained stagnant while the PPP's seems to have declined significantly. It appears that the PTI has a stronger urban base, while a higher proportion of rural respondents indicated that they would vote for either the PPP or the PML(N) in the upcoming elections.

=== Voting trends by ethnicity ===
Predictably, the highest level of support for the ruling Pakistan Peoples Party was pledged by Sindhis, 55% of whom said they would vote for the PPP in the upcoming elections. This was followed by Seraiki-speakers at 46%. Around ~44% of Hindko-speakers said they intend to vote for the Pakistan Muslim League, closely followed by Punjabi people at 43%. The same proportion of Hindko-speakers – 44% – also expressed an intention to vote for the Pakistan Tehreek-e-Insaf, indicating a close contest between the two parties (PMLN and PTI) within that particular demographic. It is worth noting that while 34% of Pakhtuns stated that they would vote for Pakistan Tehreek-e-Insaf, only 11% expressed support for the Awami National Party (ANP). 47% of Balochis said that they would vote for the Balochistan National Party. Similarly 90% Muhajirs of Hyderabad and urban areas of Karachi Largest metropolis in terms of area and population votes for Muttahida Qoumi Movement.

=== Support based on household income ===
On average, approximately a third of those earning up to 30,000 rupees each month indicated a preference for the Pakistan Peoples Party whereas, among those earning more than 30,000 rupees, support for the party dropped to 10.8 percent. This is in keeping with the party's traditional pro-poor image. No such trend could be determined for the Pakistan Muslim League, whose level of support remained similar across all income levels. Those earning in excess of 250,000 rupees each month (the highest identified income bracket in the survey) expressed the maximum intention to vote for either the Muttahida Qaumi Movement (MQM) or the Pakistan Tehreek-e-Insaf, at 33 per cent each. While this figure may appear anomalistic in the MQM's case – support for the party within the second highest income bracket (those earning between 100,000 and 250,000 rupees each month) was only four per cent – it was possible to identify a rough direct trend between level of income and support for the PTI. In general, it appeared that support for smaller parties declined with increasing levels of income.

== International monitor recommendations ==
The National Democratic Institution have stated the elections will be a "historical transition." An NDI assessment mission—consisting of Canada's former prime minister Joe Clark, former Indonesian House of Representatives member Nursanita Nasution, Chatham House senior fellow Xenia Dormandy and NDI Asia programmes director Peter Manikas—released its findings at a press briefing in Islamabad after its observation of Pakistan's political framework.

The mission visited Pakistan from 16 to 21 December and met with election authorities, government officials, party leaders, media and citizen monitoring groups. Joe Clark commended the co-operation of all parties, especially in adopting measures to bring the Federally Administered Tribal Areas under the political umbrella. Clark stated that the 18th Amendment to the constitution reflects the parliament's integrity and commitment towards a fair democratic handover. Nursanita Nasution highlighted the need to address the rights of women in the polling process so that "fear and intimidation in high-risk areas such as Baluchistan, FATA, Khyber-Pakhtunkhwa and Karachi" would not strip women of the opportunity to vote. Xenia Dormandy suggested "improving accessibility and adjusting locations" of women polling stations closer to those for men so that they could travel with the men in their families to vote. Sandra Houston, Regional Director of NDI, stated "We are impressed with the cooperation of all the stakeholders in assuring a smooth transition," sharing that voters have been registered with Computerised National Identity Cards and biometrics including photographs where possible.

=== European Union ===
The European Union offered to send its observers to Pakistan's elections, in a bid to ensure a "peaceful, credible" vote that will be "acceptable" to all. "The EU looks forward to upcoming elections that are peaceful, credible, transparent, inclusive and acceptable to the Pakistani people," EU foreign ministers said released after talks. The 27-nation bloc "is ready to assist by deploying an election observation mission, as a tangible sign of our support for the democratic process," the statement added. The ministers also said they looked forward to re-energizing ties with the next government and hoped quick contacts could lead to a third EU-Pakistan summit. Pakistan responded by saying it will welcome a European Union election observation mission during the forthcoming general elections."Yes, we will welcome the observation mission", foreign secretary Jalil Abbas Jilani said.

A 110-member team from the European Union will observe Pakistan's elections. The European Union High Representative and Vice-President of the European Commission, Ms. Catherine Ashton, has decided to authorise a European Union Election Observation Mission (EOM) to observe the elections. A member of the European Parliament will lead the 2013 EU EOM as its Chief Observer. The EU EOM team will include observers, experts, election analysts, political analysts, legal analysts, human rights analysts, media analysts and others. On the basis of special agreements with the EU, observers from Norway, Switzerland and Canada are also part of the EOM. Some members will be deployed well in advance of election day, while others will be deployed at least ten days prior to the election day.

The observers will assess aspects of the election process, nomination of candidates, election campaign, counting, tabulation, announcement of official results and complaints' procedures, and will cover pre-election preparations, election-day itself and the post-electoral period. The observers will follow the political campaign and hold regular meetings with representatives of election management bodies, political parties, candidates and civil society groups.

=== United States ===
The US Ambassador to Pakistan Richard Olsen stated that the United States applauds democratic tendencies in Pakistan, expressing hopes that free and fair general elections would lead to peaceful transfer of authority from one civilian government to successor dispensation. Completion of the current term by a democratically elected government will be a milestone in Pakistan's history.

A US delegation consisting of Senator Carl Levin, US Ambassador to Pakistan Richard Olsen and Armed Services Committee Senator Jack Reed visited Pakistan on 8 January for talks with Prime Minister Raja Pervaiz Ashraf. The delegation stated that not only the US, but the world would observe the general election with great interest.

The Centre for American Progress published a report called "Previewing Pakistan's 2013 Elections" whose author, Colin Cookman, writes that the United States should work with, and not attempt to control Pakistan's internal political processes. The report also warns that whoever wins the elections should try to resolve the problems the country faces or be prepared to face accountability. Cookman states that "only Pakistanis themselves are capable of establishing a more stable, democratic system capable of balancing diverse interest groups and effectively addressing the country's challenges."

It encourages the US to make efforts to support Pakistan's democratic evolution and the success of its upcoming elections. Such efforts should include a public commitment to neutrality and respect for the electoral processes, coupled with support for an international observation mission. It also urges US diplomatic and military officials to continue to engage with a broad array of Pakistani civilian leaders and military officials, while making it clear that the United States "does not favour any specific electoral outcome and strongly opposes any disruption of the constitutional process or intervention during the caretaker period."

US officials have denied the general perception in Pakistan that the US government wants to influence the electoral process in Pakistan to bring in a friendly government. US Secretary of State John Kerry skipped a planned visit to Pakistan to avoid accusations of meddling in the 11 May elections. Spokesperson Victoria Nuland stated that the message the United States wants to send out during the election season is "we have no favourites among Pakistani politicians and we are looking forward to work with whoever is elected on May 11." Secretary Kerry's decision to skip Pakistan during his South Asia visit is an indication of Washington's eagerness to maintain neutrality during the elections.

== Results ==
Statistics and database collected and published by the Election Commission (EC), approximately ~86.9 million Pakistanis were registered to vote. Overall, the Voter turnout was 55.02%, the highest since 1970 and 1977. (Note: See the comparison results by Election Commission for voter turn during the Pakistan general elections, 1970 and Pakistan general elections, 1977)

The Election Commission results were broadcast by news channels announcing that the PML(N) had emerged as the largest party, winning four times as many seats as its nearest competitor, the PPP. Though, it fell short for a supermajority in the Parliament. The PML-N ranks were boosted into an overall majority by 19 independent winning candidates who switched allegiance to the PML-N. The PPP emerged as the second largest party, with 45 seats, and the PTI, with 33 seats, emerged as third largest party.

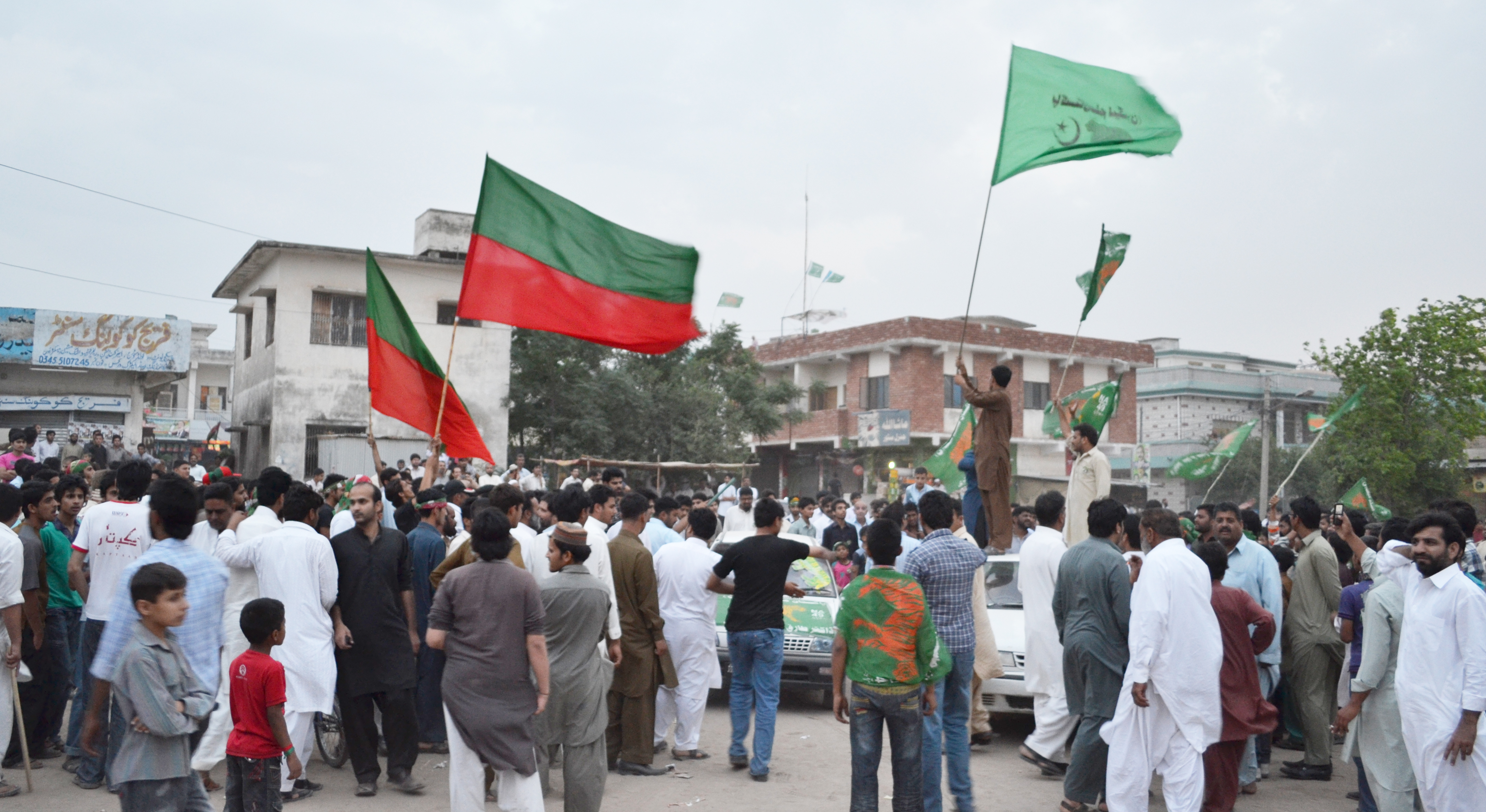
A supporter of PMLN in NA 49 Islamabad, in Model Town Hummak, on the roof of a car rising his party flag and announcing the triumph of his party in that area

=== National Assembly ===
Following the elections, 19 independents joined PML(N).

Party	Votes	%	Seats				
Party	Votes	%	General	Women	Minority	Total	+/–
Pakistan Muslim League (N)	14,874,104	32.77	126	34	6	166	+78
Pakistan Tehreek-e-Insaf	7,679,954	16.92	28	6	1	35	New
Pakistan Peoples Party	6,911,218	15.23	33	8	1	42	–74
Muttahida Qaumi Movement – London	2,456,153	5.41	19	4	1	24	–1
Jamiat Ulema-e-Islam (F)	1,461,371	3.22	11	3	1	15	New
Pakistan Muslim League (Q)	1,409,905	3.11	2	0	0	2	–52
Pakistan Muslim League (F)	1,072,846	2.36	5	1	0	6	+1
Jamaat-e-Islami Pakistan	963,909	2.12	3	1	0	4	New
Awami National Party	453,057	1.00	2	0	0	3	–10
Muttahida Majlis-e-Amal	360,297	0.79	0	0	0	0	New
Pashtunkhwa Milli Awami Party	214,631	0.47	3	1	0	4	New
National Peoples Party	197,829	0.44	2	1	0	3	+2
Pakistan Muslim League (Z)	128,510	0.28	1	0	0	1	New
Bahawalpur National Awami Party	113,365	0.25	0	0	0	0	New
Jamiat Ulama-e-Islam Nazryati	103,098	0.23	0	0	0	0	New
Awami Muslim League	93,046	0.20	1	0	0	1	New
Sindh United Party	82,634	0.18	0	0	0	0	0
Tehreek-e-Tahaffuz-e-Pakistan	76,358	0.17	0	0	0	0	New
Pakistan Muslim League (J)	71,773	0.16	0	0	0	0	New
Awami Jamhuri Ittehad Pakistan	71,175	0.16	1	0	0	1	New
Jamiat Ulema-e-Pakistan	67,966	0.15	0	0	0	0	New
Balochistan National Party	63,979	0.14	1	0	0	1	New
National Party	61,148	0.13	1	0	0	1	+1
All Pakistan Muslim League	54,231	0.12	1	0	0	1	New
Pakistan National Muslim League	52,398	0.12	0	0	0	0	New
Pakistan Peoples Party (Shaheed Bhutto)	50,046	0.11	0	0	0	0	0
Qaumi Watan Party	46,574	0.10	1	0	0	1	New
Tehreek-e-Suba Hazara	43,265	0.10	0	0	0	0	New
Majlis Wahdat-e-Muslimeen	41,520	0.09	0	0	0	0	New
Sunni Ittehad Council	37,732	0.08	0	0	0	0	New
Sunni Tehreek	25,485	0.06	0	0	0	0	0
Sindh Taraqi Passand Party	23,397	0.05	0	0	0	0	New
Qoumi Wattan Party	19,253	0.04	0	0	0	0	New
Awami Workers Party	18,650	0.04	0	0	0	0	New
Balochistan National Party (Awami)	12,866	0.03	0	0	0	0	–1
Hazara Democratic Party	11,052	0.02	0	0	0	0	0
Mohajir Qaumi Movement	10,575	0.02	0	0	0	0	New
Jamote Qaumi Movement	10,468	0.02	0	0	0	0	New
Saraiki Party	5,236	0.01	0	0	0	0	New
Kissan Ittehad	4,367	0.01	0	0	0	0	New
Falah Party	4,207	0.01	0	0	0	0	New
Awami Justice Party	3,803	0.01	0	0	0	0	New
Pakistan Justice Party	3,230	0.01	0	0	0	0	New
Islami Tehreek	2,694	0.01	0	0	0	0	New
Christian Progressive Movement	2,523	0.01	0	0	0	0	New
Mohib-e-Wattan Nowjawan Inqilabion Ki Anjuman	2,503	0.01	0	0	0	0	New
Mutahidda Qabil Party	2,399	0.01	0	0	0	0	New
Qaumi Tahaffaz Party	2,202	0.00	0	0	0	0	New
Mustaqbil Pakistan	2,052	0.00	0	0	0	0	New
Sairkistan Qaumi Ittehad	1,890	0.00	0	0	0	0	New
Seraiki Sooba Movement	1,797	0.00	0	0	0	0	New
Awami Workers Party	1,657	0.00	0	0	0	0	New
Jamhoori Wattan Party	1,632	0.00	0	0	0	0	0
Karwan-i-Millat	1,412	0.00	0	0	0	0	New
Jannat Pakistan Party	1,269	0.00	0	0	0	0	New
Tehreek Tabdili Nizam	1,164	0.00	0	0	0	0	New
Pakistan Muslim League (SB)	1,063	0.00	0	0	0	0	New
Pakistan Insani Haqook Party	989	0.00	0	0	0	0	New
Pakistan Patriotic Movement	948	0.00	0	0	0	0	New
Pakistan Muslim League (S)	890	0.00	0	0	0	0	New
Markazi Jamiat Mushaikh	833	0.00	0	0	0	0	New
Pakistan Conservative Party	794	0.00	0	0	0	0	New
Tehreek-e-Istehkaam	651	0.00	0	0	0	0	New
Islamic Republican Party	631	0.00	0	0	0	0	New
Pakistan Tehrek-e-Inqalab	593	0.00	0	0	0	0	0
Tehreek-e-Ittehad Ummat	583	0.00	0	0	0	0	New
Pak Justice Party	537	0.00	0	0	0	0	New
Pakistan Freedom Party	502	0.00	0	0	0	0	0
Roshan Pakistan Muhaibban Wattan Party	493	0.00	0	0	0	0	New
Pakistan Muslim League (H)	472	0.00	0	0	0	0	New
Mutahida Baloch Movement	471	0.00	0	0	0	0	New
Menecracy Action Party	447	0.00	0	0	0	0	New
Awami Himayat Tehreek	330	0.00	0	0	0	0	0
Islami Inqalab Party	274	0.00	0	0	0	0	New
Pakistan Human Rights Party	266	0.00	0	0	0	0	New
Jamiat Ulema-e-Islam (S)	258	0.00	0	0	0	0	0
Pakistan Gharib Party	256	0.00	0	0	0	0	0
Sindh Dost Ittehad Party	250	0.00	0	0	0	0	New
Istehkaam-e-Pakistan	240	0.00	0	0	0	0	New
Pak Wattan Party	220	0.00	0	0	0	0	New
Istiqlal Party	218	0.00	0	0	0	0	New
Hazara Awami Ittehad	214	0.00	0	0	0	0	New
Pakistan National Democratic Party	191	0.00	0	0	0	0	New
Communist Party of Pakistan	191	0.00	0	0	0	0	New
Ghareeb Awam Party	174	0.00	0	0	0	0	New
Pakistan Muslim League (M)	172	0.00	0	0	0	0	New
Pakistan Muslim League (C)	152	0.00	0	0	0	0	New
Afgan Qomi Movement	152	0.00	0	0	0	0	New
Pakistan Brohi Party	149	0.00	0	0	0	0	New
Pakistan Muhajir League	134	0.00	0	0	0	0	New
Pakistan Muhafiz Watan Party	126	0.00	0	0	0	0	New
Azad Pakistan Party	116	0.00	0	0	0	0	0
Pakistan Muslim League (Zehri)	101	0.00	0	0	0	0	New
Tehreek-e-Masawaat	99	0.00	0	0	0	0	New
All Pakistan Bayrozgar Party	89	0.00	0	0	0	0	New
Pakistan Aman Party	71	0.00	0	0	0	0	0
Muttahida Majlis-e-Amal	69	0.00	0	0	0	0	New
Pakistan Motherland Party	68	0.00	0	0	0	0	New
Pakistan Muslim League (H)	64	0.00	0	0	0	0	New
Pakistan Qaumi Party	55	0.00	0	0	0	0	0
Pakistan Islami Justice Party	54	0.00	0	0	0	0	New
Tehreek-e-Wafaq	48	0.00	0	0	0	0	New
Salam Pakistan Party	34	0.00	0	0	0	0	New
Aap Janab Sarkar Party	30	0.00	0	0	0	0	New
Jamiat Ulma-e-Pakistan (Niazi)	27	0.00	0	0	0	0	New
Pakistan Muhammadi Party	24	0.00	0	0	0	0	New
Aalay Kalam Ullah Farman Rasool	15	0.00	0	0	0	0	New
All Pakistan Youth Working Party	14	0.00	0	0	0	0	New
Punjab National Party	13	0.00	0	0	0	0	0
Pakistan Awami Quwat Party	9	0.00	0	0	0	0	New
Pakistan Awami Inqalab	7	0.00	0	0	0	0	New
Independents	5,880,658	12.96	27	0	0	27	–3
Repoll ordered			3	–	–	3	–
Postponed/terminated/withheld			5	–	1	6	–
Total	45,388,404	100.00	272	60	10	342	0
Registered voters/turnout	84,207,524	–					
Source: ECP (elected seats), ECP (minority seats), ECP (women seats), ECP (votes)

=== Provincial Assemblies ===
Party	Seats			
Party	Punjab	Sindh	Balochistan	KP
Pakistan Muslim League (N)	214	4	8	12
Pakistan Tehreek-e-Insaf	24	2	1	39
Pakistan Peoples Party	6	94	0	3
Muttahida Qaumi Movement – London	0	34	0	0
Jamiat Ulema-e-Islam (F)	0	0	0	13
Pakistan Muslim League (F)	0	6	0	0
Jamaat-e-Islami	1	1	0	7
Pashtunkhwa Milli Awami Party	0	0	10	0
National Peoples Party	0	2	0	0
Pakistan Muslim League (Q)	7	0	2	0
National Party (Pakistan)	0	0	6	0
Awami National Party	0	0	1	5
Balochistan National Party	0	0	2	0
All Pakistan Muslim League	0	0	0	1
Pakistan Muslim League (Z)	2	0	0	0
Awami Muslim League	0	0	0	0
Qaumi Watan Party	0	0	0	7
Awami Jamhuri Ittehad Pakistan	0	0	0	3
Bahawalpur National Awami Party	1	0	0	0
Jamote Qaumi Movement	0	0	2	0
Majlis Wahdat-e-Muslimeen	0	0	1	0
Pakistan National Muslim League	1	0	0	0
Independents	39	6	7	14
Results awaited	8	0	6	0
Elections postponed	2	1	1	0
Total	297	130	51	99
Source: ECP

== Reactions ==
=== Domestic ===
On the night of the elections, the youth supporter, partisans, and lobbyists gathered in Raiwand– a private residential place of president of the PML, Nawaz Sharif. Speaking to his supporters and media representatives, Nawaz Sharif who was standing with his daughter, Maryam Nawaz and wife Kulsoom Nawaz, said:

Through this vote and campaign, I have felt how much love Pakistan has for me. And I have twice as much love for you. Thank God that he has given us the chance to help you, to help Pakistan, to help the young people. We will fulfill all the promises that we have made. Pray that we can make a government on our own, without compromises or have to lean on anyone else. Because if we have to ask for seats, we cannot make a strong government. We forgive anyone who has abused us along the way and we have not cursed anyone. We want to get Pakistan out of trouble. We have a program to change the State of Pakistan. We must make a decision to change this country. To all other parties, I say come and sit at the table.

— Nawaz Sharif, on 11 May 2013, source

The Chief Election Commissioner Fakhruddin G. Ebrahim expressed gratitude to the voters for the record high turnout of 60%. Secretary of the Election Commission Ishtiaq Ahmed Khan said that the elections were free, fair and transparent and the claims of irregularities will be answered on a case-by-case basis.

Even before the result was announced, the PTI conceded defeat. PTI leader Imran Khan congratulated Nawaz Sharif but also demanded recounting in numerous constituencies.

MQM leader Altaf Hussain spoke to PML (N). He also called then the 'Punjabis representative party.' He went on to say that the "Muslim League (N) has emerged victorious in the elections and Nawaz Sharif is a representative leader of the Punjabis." His statements were condemned by some in the Pakistani media and from supporters of the PML (N).

Military analyst and security expert Talat Masood said: "This is an ideal and a graceful victory for Sharif. He will form a strong government at the center, which is badly needed to tackle some enormous economic and security challenges."

President Asif Ali Zardari blamed the poor performance of PPP on a domestic and international conspiracy, as well as domestic terrorism by the Taliban preventing the party from campaigning.

=== Economic ===
The country's stocks rose to record and the economic indicators performed well in advance of the unofficially determined results in an expectation of PML(N)'s win.

Upon news of the results, the KSE 100 at the Karachi Stock Exchange crossed the 20,000 mark for the first time on 13 May 2013. The victory by PML(N) in the general election lifted the stock market to an all-time high on 11–13 May, in a sign that investors, which include Goldman Sachs and Mark Mobius of Templeton, were seen as the top foreign investors at the Karachi Stock Exchange on the prospect of further market gains through a stable government.

On the day of the elections, the benchmark KSE 100 Index gained 1.8%, the most since 12 March, ~20,272.28 Marks, taking its rally this year to 20.0%. The MCB Ltd. gained ~4.9% to ₨. 261.60 million, poised for the highest close since May 2008. The Pakistan State Oil (PSO) jumped 5.0% to ₨. 221.86 million; the ABL Assets also increased its profit variation to ~$203.0 million.

=== International ===
Supranational bodies

- European Union – High Representative for Foreign Affairs and Security Policy Catherine Ashton called the election an "historic victory" for democracy in the country. "I wish to congratulate the people of Pakistan. The 2013 general election marks a historic victory for the democratic life on their country. Despite an extremely difficult security environment and threats from extremists, voters turned out in unprecedented numbers with many Pakistani citizens voting for the first time. All the main stakeholders, in particular the political parties and state institutions, acted in a responsible manner, demonstrating their support for democracy and the holding of the elections."
- United Nations – Secretary-General Ban Ki-moon congratulated the government and people of Pakistan on the successful conduction of national and provincial elections, hailing the polls, for which millions of voters turned out, as a major democratic step. "This is the first ever transition from one civilian government to another and a significant step forward for democracy in the country. By exercising their constitutional right to vote, the people of Pakistan have reaffirmed their desire for and commitment to a democratic Pakistan and their respect for the constitution of the country."

States

- Afghanistan – President Hamid Karzai telephoned PML (N) leader Nawaz Sharif and congratulated him on his party triumph in the general elections. The Afghan President also expressed well wishes for Nawaz Sharif and his party. Karzai said that he was optimistic that ties between two brotherly countries would be friendly after Nawaz take charge of Premier office. Nawaz vowed that Pakistan would take every step to improve its relationship with all neighbours especially with Afghanistan.
- China – President Xi Jinping and the Ministry of Foreign Affairs congratulated Nawaz Sharif. Spokesman Hong Lei said the Chinese government were happy to see steady and smooth elections in Pakistan. "As China's all-weather friend, China will continue to support Pakistan's efforts to maintain stability and achieve development. Sino-Pakistani friendly and cooperative relations will enter into a new high with the efforts by the two sides."
- India – Prime Minister Manmohan Singh congratulated Nawaz Sharif on his "emphatic victory" in the historic elections and said he hoped for better relations. Singh wrote on his official Twitter account: "Congratulations to Mr. Nawaz Sharif and his party for their emphatic victory in Pakistan's elections". He said he hoped to work with Sharif to chart "a new course for the relationship" between the nuclear-armed neighbours and invited him to "visit India at a mutually convenient time."

Jammu and Kashmir Chief Minister Omar Abdullah congratulated Nawaz Sharif for his party's performance and hoped that he would live up to his commitment to restart the peace process with India.
The opposition BJP congratulated Mr. Nawaz Sharif on his historic electoral victory

- Saudi Arabia – The royal family greeted Nawaz Sharif on his thumping victory in the elections. Sources said that Saudi personalities congratulating Nawaz Sharif have expressed their well wishes for him.
- Sri Lanka – President Mahinda Rajapaksa telephoned Nawaz Sharif and congratulated him on his victory in historic election.
- Iran – Foreign Ministry spokesman Abbas Araghchi congratulated Pakistan for successful elections and for Sharif's ability to win the people's trust. Araqchi further pointed to the close relations between Iran and Pakistan and hoped for further expansion of bilateral relations between the two neighbouring countries.
- Turkey – Both President Abdullah Gul and Prime Minister Recep Tayyip Erdogan made separate phone calls to Nawaz Sharif and felicitated him on his victory.
- United Arab Emirates – Sheikh Khalifa congratulated Nawaz Sharif on his victory in the elections.
- United Kingdom – Prime Minister David Cameron congratulated Nawaz Sharif on his resounding election victory and praised his commitment to economic reforms. Cameron spoke to Sharif on the telephone and they agreed to work to reinforce the "strong bond" between their two countries. They also pledged their commitment to the trilateral process, the three-way talks between Britain, Pakistan and Afghanistan aimed at finding peace in Afghanistan, where Britain is starting to reduce its 9,000-strong troop presence. The Prime Minister and Nawaz Sharif agreed that the strong bond between the UK and Pakistan was a huge asset and that they would work together to strengthen the relationship further. Cameron welcomed Nawaz Sharif's commitment to prioritise economic reforms. The two leaders also agreed on their shared commitment to the trilateral process and its importance in achieving peace in Afghanistan and the wider region.
- United States – President Barack Obama praised Pakistanis for upholding their commitment to democratic rule by successfully completing the elections. Obama hailed "this historic peaceful and transparent transfer of civilian power." He said Pakistanis ran competitive campaigns and persevered despite "intimidation by violent extremists." Three days later, Obama called Sharif over the phone and again congratulated him on his party's election victory. "The US president said his country respects the mandate given to Nawaz Sharif in the elections." US Secretary of State John Kerry called Sharif on the phone to congratulate him on his strong showing in Saturday's elections. Kerry also told Sharif that he looks forward to working with the government as the government is formed in Pakistan. Kerry is hoping to visit Pakistan soon, once the new government is in place.

== Controversies ==
=== Incidents of malpractice and rigging ===
- The winning candidate on PS-114, in Sindh of the ruling PML-N was disqualified and re-election ordered after it emerged that a large number of votes were invalid
- The winning candidate on PP-97 Gujranwala, from the ruling PML-N, was disqualified and fresh elections were ordered after it emerged that serious rigging had taken place on the seat
- The Chief Election Commissioner conceded that the Election Commission had failed to conduct free and fair elections in Karachi, Pakistan's largest city of 20 million and its main economic hub.
- The Chief election Commissioner resigned, citing extreme judicial interference preventing the investigation of voter irregularities.
- The Election Commission admitted that it had no control of the Returning officers, the persons responsible for overseeing the election at individual polling stations.
- The PTI demanded the thumb verification be held in four constituencies – to check if the votes were genuine or bogus. The PMLN refused, ostensibly due to cost, despite the fact that the PTI offered to pay
- A candidate for PTI paid ₨.5 million to have his votes verified. The election commission then confirmed that 265 bags of votes were bogus and only 69 were genuine. The PTI candidate was defeated by the PML-N candidate.
- A candidate of JUI-F was disqualified after it was learned that there had been rigging on 28 different women's polling stations.
- A PTI candidate disqualified PS-93 seat in Karachi to JI and re-election was ordered.
- In the National Assembly Constituency NA-125 the National Database and Registration Authority NADRA found that more than 20% of all votes cast were not verifiable
- In the National Assembly Constituency NA-118 the National Database and Registration Authority NADRA found that more than 33% of the votes cast could not be verified. More than 4000 votes were cast with incorrect/incomplete CNIC numbers. This constituency had been won by Malik Riaz.
- In the National Assembly Constituency NA-154 the National Database and Registration Authority NADRA found that more than 20,000 votes were not verifiable. The seat was won by an independent candidate, Muhammad Siddique Khan Baloch, who later joined the Pakistan Muslim League-N.
- In the Provincial Assembly Constituency PP-107 (Hafizabad-III) the election tribunal found evidence of "massive" and "organized" rigging.The extracts of the report, focusing on PP-107, Hafizabad-III, stated that "the result of the election favourable to the returned candidate is not the will of the electors of the constituency in the true sense at all". Tribunal judge Kazim Ali Malik states, "The election does not reflect the true will of the people."

"I am fully justified on the basis of documentary evidence to set aside the election of the returned candidate, which does not reflect the true will of the people," Malik states in the report. "I therefore discard the available record as well as the election record, which has been misappropriated or stolen. I declare the election of the returned candidates from PP-107, Hafizabad-III as a whole to be void." In PP-107, Hafizabad-III, 21,298 fake and bogus votes were counted as valid votes towards the vote account of the candidates. The number of used counterfoils found in election bags by the commission was 54,242, while the total number of polled votes in a statement by the Returning Officer (RO) was recorded as 72,895.

- In the Provincial Assembly Constituency PP-97 (Gujranwala-VII) the election tribunal declared null and void the voting results in PP-97 and ordered re-election on 33 polling stations in the Punjab Assembly constituency won by ruling Pakistan Muslim League-Nawaz's candidate.

=== Incidents of improper investigations ===
- The PML-N has been accused of hindering the bureaucracy's ability to carry out Free and fair elections, Tariq Malik, the chairman of NADRA was fired by Nawaz Sharif after he announced that NADRA had the technology to verify votes through thumbprint verification. The Islamabad High Court had him restored to his position, after which Tariq Malik resigned alleging that he had been threatened with kidnapping of him and his family by those who did not want the election process verified.
- After Tariq Malik's sacking. It emerged that someone had broken into NADRA's office and tampered with the ballot boxes of seat NA-118 (Lahore) which was at the centre of the rigging allegations. The boxes had been moved to NADRA so that the votes could be thumb verified, as demanded by the PTI, but had instead been tampered with. This has led to accusations by the opposition that the civil service is either under extreme pressure or incompetent in adjudicating disputes but no proof was given

=== Incidents of incompetence ===
- The election commission confirmed that there was a "typing error" on NA-68. PM Nawaz Sharif's winning seat, it emerged that the PM had received only 779 votes rather than 7879 as originally recorded. This has led to accusations of incompetence which has compromised the fairness of the elections
- They announced this a whole year after the PTI, led by Imran Khan demanded an investigation, which has led to accusations of critical inefficiency at the ECP.

== Analysis ==
=== Aftermath ===
On 17 May 2013, the Vice-President of the PTI, Zahra Hussain, was shot and killed in Karachi just before re-election was due to be held. Three days later, it was announced that the PTI had taken the Karachi seat in re-polling. Imran Khan alleged that Altaf Hussain, a leader of MQM, was responsible for inciting violence and was responsible for the murder. Few days later, British Police raided Altaf Hussain's house in London.

=== Government formation ===
The PML(N)'s key strategist, Sartaj Aziz, announced in news media the next day that the independents candidates were in negotiation process with the PML(N) to join the party to form the government and to work out "a few key portfolios."

A total of nineteenth independents who had won from their respected constituencies joined the PML(N), which allowed the party to form a government with a simple majority. This swing ultimately led to Nawaz Sharif elevated as the Prime Minister. Soon after his appointment, Sharif said after being formally approved as prime minister that in regards to drone strikes: "We respect the sovereignty of others and they should also respect our sovereignty and independence. This campaign should come to an end." Despite this, two days later another drone strike killed seven people in Pakistan.

==== Election for prime pinister ====
The election for prime minister took place on 5 June 2013.

←2012	5 June 2013	2017→
Candidate	Party	Votes Obtained
Required majority →		172 out of 342
Nawaz Sharif	PMLN	244
Ameen Faheem	PPP	42
Javed Hashmi	PTI	31
Abstentions		<25
