= Gotl =

Gotl or GOTL may refer to:

- a surname (such as with Bela Gotl, coach for the Libyan squad in the 1982 African Cup of Nations)
- Government of Timor-Leste
  - In the context of Foreign aid to Timor-Leste, a UN program to support the new government
- Guardians of the Legend, 1998-2000 animated television series
