= Poverty in Timor-Leste =

Timor-LesteIn Southeast Asia, (formerly East Timor) continues to be one of the world's poorest countries, with GDP per capita standing at $3,949 (2011). It is ranked 147 out of 187 (2011) countries in the UN's Human Development Index.

As of 2015, Timor-Leste had a population of 1.17 million and an annual growth rate at 1.8%. Based on the total population, 40.2% aged 15 years and above were employed.

== Causes ==
As of 2011, 37.4% of civilians live below the international poverty line of $1.25 (in purchasing power parity terms) per day and 40% of the population is malnourished. Life expectancy at birth is 62.5 years.

Existence of poor governance, coupled with lack of accountability and transparency are reasons why Timor-Leste has been unable to break out from this poverty trap. In the 2010 Corruption Perceptions Index, Timor-Leste scored 2.5 (out of 10) and was ranked 127th out of 178 countries. "Without a clean and competent governmental institution to provide a stable business environment, Timor-Leste has failed to attract much foreign direct investment (FDI) which would help to improve the unemployment and poverty situations", as stated by Dionisio Da Cruz Pereira, a former staff of the United Nations and the World Bank group in Timor-Leste.

== Development Goals ==
When Timor-Leste gained its independence in 2002, the government initiated a National Development plan (NDP), to work with international communities and aid agencies in its effort to reduce poverty and develop a sustainable economy aimed at improving the health, education and well-being of its people. This was aligned with the Millennium Development Goals (MDG) set for 2015. 10 years on, progress has only been minuscule and Timor-Leste is still heavily dependent on foreign aid. According to World Development Index, Timor-Leste receives approximately US$185 million in aid per annum, which accounts for 33% of its gross national income.

== Efforts to alleviate poverty ==
The Poverty Reduction Unit of UN supports the Government of Timor-Leste in designing development strategies and programs aimed at developing the rural areas of the country, including building proper rural infrastructure. The government has also distributed tractors and seeds to rural farmers to boost agricultural production and provided affordable rice to communities both in urban and rural areas. It is also working to enhance banking literacy in rural areas by strengthening microfinance institutions through the development of pro-poor products and services. Furthermore, it has distributed scholarships to many East Timorese students to pursue tertiary education within and outside of Timor-Leste.
