= Mustaqbil Pakistan =

Mustaqbil Pakistan مستقبل پاکستان
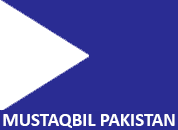
- Abbreviation: MP
- Chairman: Nadeem Mumtaz Qureshi
- Founded: 2010

Election symbol
- Comb

Party flag
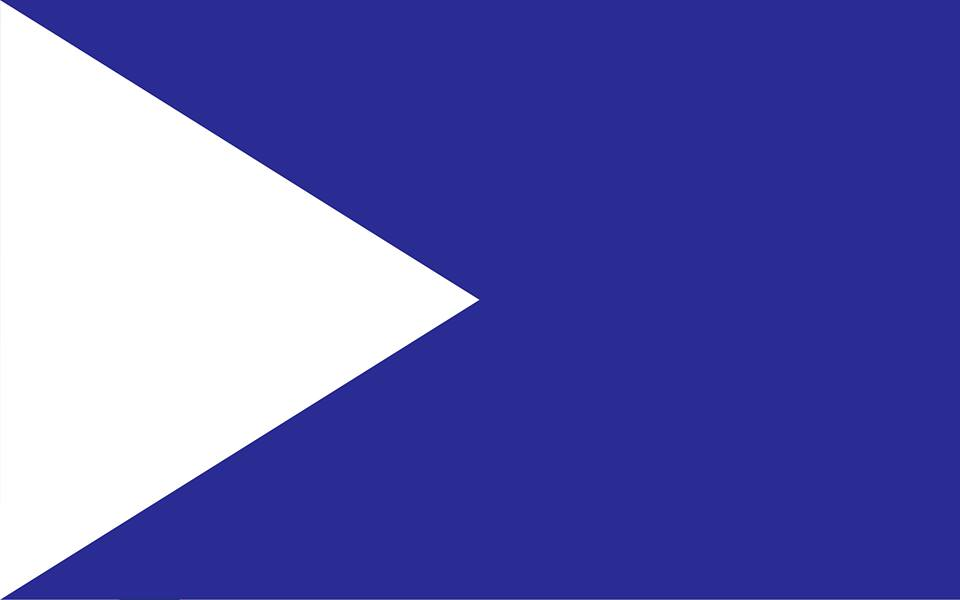

Website
- Official website

Mustaqbil Pakistan (Urdu: مستقبل پاکستان, MP) is a political party founded in 2010 by a group of politicians looking to bring about a change in politics in Pakistan. The main emphasis of the party is to bring people of competence, integrity, and honesty into Pakistani politics. The founders of the party allege that all of Pakistan's travails - poverty, corruption, terrorism, sectarian violence and lawlessness - are due to a single root cause: that the people who are now in Pakistan's politics do not have the necessary competence, integrity, honesty and even desire to run the country.

== Chairman, National Executive Committee, & Presidents ==
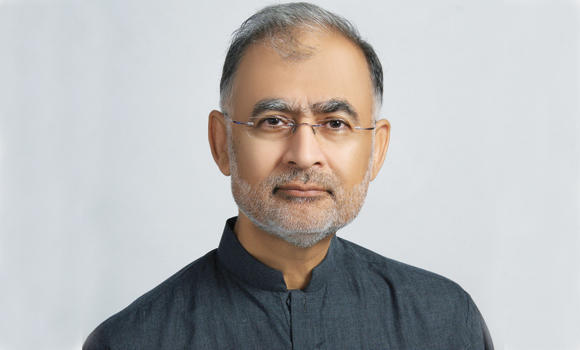
Nadeem Mumtaz Qureshi, chairman, Mustaqbil Pakistan

The party's first chairman is Nadeem Mumtaz Qureshi, an engineer by training and a fluent Arabic speaker. He is also one of the founding members of the party as well as one of six members of the party's national executive committee. The other members of the committee include Moeen Qureshi, Waqar Haider Bokhari, Unsia Bano, Dawoodi Morkas, and Sheheryar Ali.

== Activity ==
MP's presence has 12 offices in three provinces of the country. The party has over 10,000 registered members and over 170,000 supporters and well-wishers on social media. The party has seen large expansion and participated in the 2018 general elections, but did not gain any seats in both the provincial or parliamentary assembly. Special attention is being given to remote areas of the country such as the mountainous north of the country where the party recently opened an office in Swat. Volunteers and members have increased in large numbers since the formation of the party. Today, MP has more than 11,000 registered members and thousands of volunteers across Pakistan. The Central office is in Multan and the other branch office is in Athara Hazari.

== Women ==
MP includes a female lawyers wing which advocates for women's rights.

== Flag ==
The blue color represents the horizon, sky, flight, vastness, and the world.

The white color represents peace, clarity, and brightness.

The triangle of white is a stars corner derived from the Pakistani Flag.

== National Party Song ==
The national song of the party, titled Waqt ki Azaan, Mustaqbil Pakistan, was written by Naveed Ansari, in time for the 2013 elections in which Mustaqbil Pakistan participated. Another song written for the party is entitled Mustaqbil Pakistan Ka Tum He Toh Ho.

== Elections ==
The 2013 elections included 22 candidates from MP, 18 for the Provincial Assembly and 5 for the National Assembly.

In general elections of 2018, the chairman, Nadeem Mumtaz Qureshi contested for NA-114 and NA-156 national assembly and a further 10 candidates contested for both national and provincial assemblies.

The party issued tickets to only those who fulfilled and qualified MP's criteria. Following are the names and constituencies.

1. Nadeem Mumtaz Qureshi NA – 156

2. Muhammad Atif Imran NA – 155

3. Nadeem Mumtaz Qureshi NA – 114

4. Sher Muhammad Gondal NA – 85

5. Syed Usman Ali PP – 125

6. Muhammad Umar Shafi PP – 130

7. Muhammad Yousuf Ansari PP – 215

8. Muhammad Rafiq Chohan PP – 220

9. Muhammad Shahid PP – 223

10. Muhammad Sajid Thaim PP – 269
