= Zahra Shahid Hussain =

Pakistani politician (died 2013)

Personal details
- Born: Karachi, Pakistan
- Died: 18 May 2013 Karachi, Pakistan
- Party: Pakistan Tehreek-e-Insaf (1992-2013)

Zahra Shahid Hussain (Urdu: زہرہ شاہد حسین) also known as Zara Apa, was a Pakistani activist-politician, teacher and the senior vice president of Imran Khan's Pakistan Tehreek-e-Insaf (PTI) in Sindh. She had formerly served as the president for PTI's women's wing of the party in Sindh, and was a member of the central executive committee of the party. On 18 May 2013, she was assassinated outside her house in the upscale Defence Housing Authority neighborhood in Karachi.

== Assassination ==
According to police, Hussain was ambushed by two people on a motorcycle. Her murder took place on the eve of a highly contested partial rerun of the general election. According to a witness, "The assailants opened fire...as soon as she reached the gate of her residence. Apparently they were there to target her only". An eyewitness said that she had handed the attackers her belongings, but they shot her even then. Another report from Dawn News said that "[a]ccording to police, three motorcycle riders tried to steal Hussain’s handbag and opened fire upon resistance" (emphasis added). This report attributed the "handed [the purse] over" report to PTI leader Firdous Shamim.

== See also ==
- Imran Khan
