= Xenia Wickett =

British executive coach

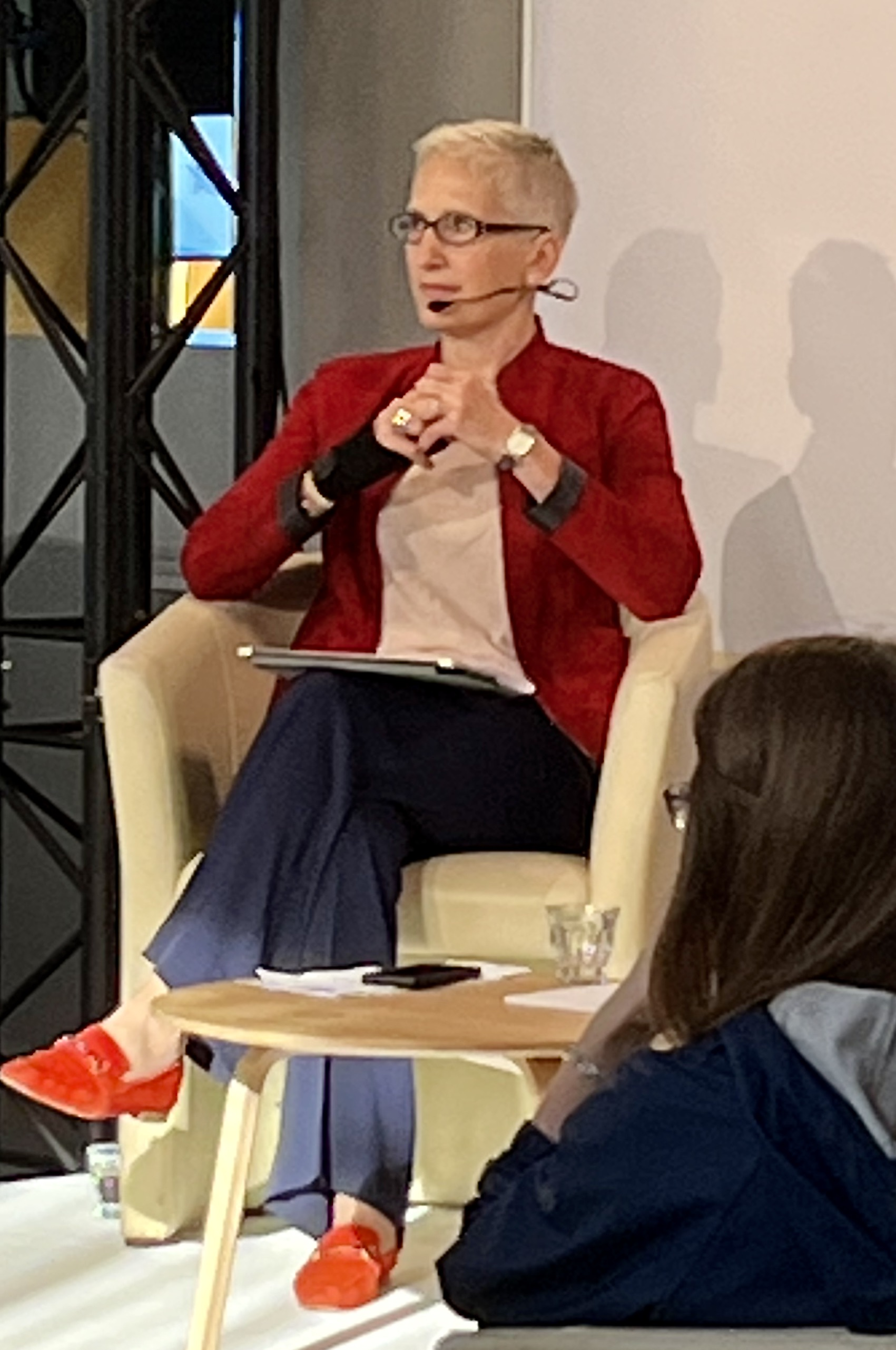
- Wickett moderating at the 2022 GMF Brussels Forum
- Born: Xenia Beryl Middleton Dormandy
- Education: Oxford University, Harvard Kennedy School of Government, Henley Business School
- Occupations: Executive coach and international advisor
- Organization: Wickett Advisory

Xenia Wickett (née Dormandy) is a British-American executive coach and international advisor.

== Biography ==
Wickett leads her own business, Wickett Advisory, that helps individuals and institutions make smarter, more informed decisions by gaining a broader perspective on their challenges and opportunities. The organisation achieves this through three key services: a) executive coaching; b) international affairs insights; and c) moderation, facilitation and hosting capabilities.

Until mid-2021, Xenia was the Vice President of Political Analysis and Integrity Due Dilgience at Equinor (previously Statoil). Her work focused on analyzing international affairs, country risk and security issues as well as changing ESG standards and expectations. She also ensured corporate adherence to international integrity standards.

Immediately prior to Equinor, Wickett was the project director of the US Project at Chatham House and Dean of the Queen Elizabeth II Academy for Leadership in International Affairs, Chatham House’s new leadership training initiative. Previously, she was the executive director of the PeaceNexus Foundation, based outside Geneva, which she launched in 2009. From 2005 to 2009, Wickett was at Harvard Kennedy School's Belfer Center where she was the director of the Project on India and the Subcontinent and the executive director for research.

From early 2004 to August 2005, Wickett served as director for South Asia at the U.S. National Security Council (NSC). Prior to her NSC post, Wickett served as a foreign affairs specialist in the Bureau of South Asia at the Department of State. Her major portfolios included counterterrorism, nonproliferation, Kashmir, and other law enforcement topics. During her tenure at the Department of State, Wickett was also a special advisor at the Homeland Security Group, and an officer in the Bureau of Nonproliferation. Shortly after September 11, 2001, she was detailed from the Department of State to the Office of the Vice President (OVP) to help launch the Office of Homeland Security Affairs.

Wickett is a member of the executive committee of The Pilgrims, sits on the board of trustees of Transparency International UK, and serves on the faculty of Chatham House's Academy for Leadership in International Affairs. She stepped down as a Commissioner for the Marshall Aid Commemoration Commission in summer 2022 and from the Programme Committee at Ditchley Park in March 2024. Previously she has sat on committees at the Council on Foreign Relations and the World Economic Forum. She has spoken, moderated and facilitated high-level discussions at events including Aspen, ONS, FT Weekend Festival and the GMF Brussels Forum.

Wickett is the author of numerous articles and op-eds in publications such as The Washington Quarterly, The Washington Post, Boston Globe, Christian Science Monitor and International New York Times, and she has been interviewed on radio and television for such programs as the BBC, NPR, C-SPAN, CNN, Fox News, Al Jazeera and the Jim Lehrer News Hour. She regularly appears on and hosts podcasts.

Prior to her government service, Wickett worked in the nonprofit and private sectors in California, Israel and the West Bank, and the UK, and for UNICEF in New York.

Wickett holds a Bachelor of Arts from Oxford University and a Masters in Public Policy from the Harvard Kennedy School of Government. She also has a Certificate in Executive Coaching from Henley Business School and is a qualified ACC with the International Coaching Federation.
