= Foreign aid to Timor-Leste =

Overview of aid

Timor Leste, since its creation in 1999, has received aid from many different parts of the International Community to help stabilise this new country. Despite this international support, Timor-Leste still has stability issues.

== Bilateral aid ==
=== Military Intervention ===
After the East Timor Special Autonomy Referendum, the United Nations Transitional Administration in East Timor administered the country to ensure the proper creation of the government. This organisation was supported by a large coalition of international troops led by Australia titled International Force for East Timor. Since then, similar coalitions of forces have had to intervene in the 2006 East Timorese crisis in Operation Astute.

=== United Nations Integrated Mission in Timor-Leste ===
The United Nations Integrated Mission in Timor-Leste, initially mandated to run through 2008 was extended twice, first through 2009 then 2010.

==== Election Support ====
Part of the program was a program to support the Government of Timor-Leste (GOTL) to enhance democratic governance and facilitate political dialogue. The presidential and parliamentary electoral support programs included technical and logistical support and electoral policy advice and verification. One of the more significant programs was the presence of 1,635 UN police officers for elections.

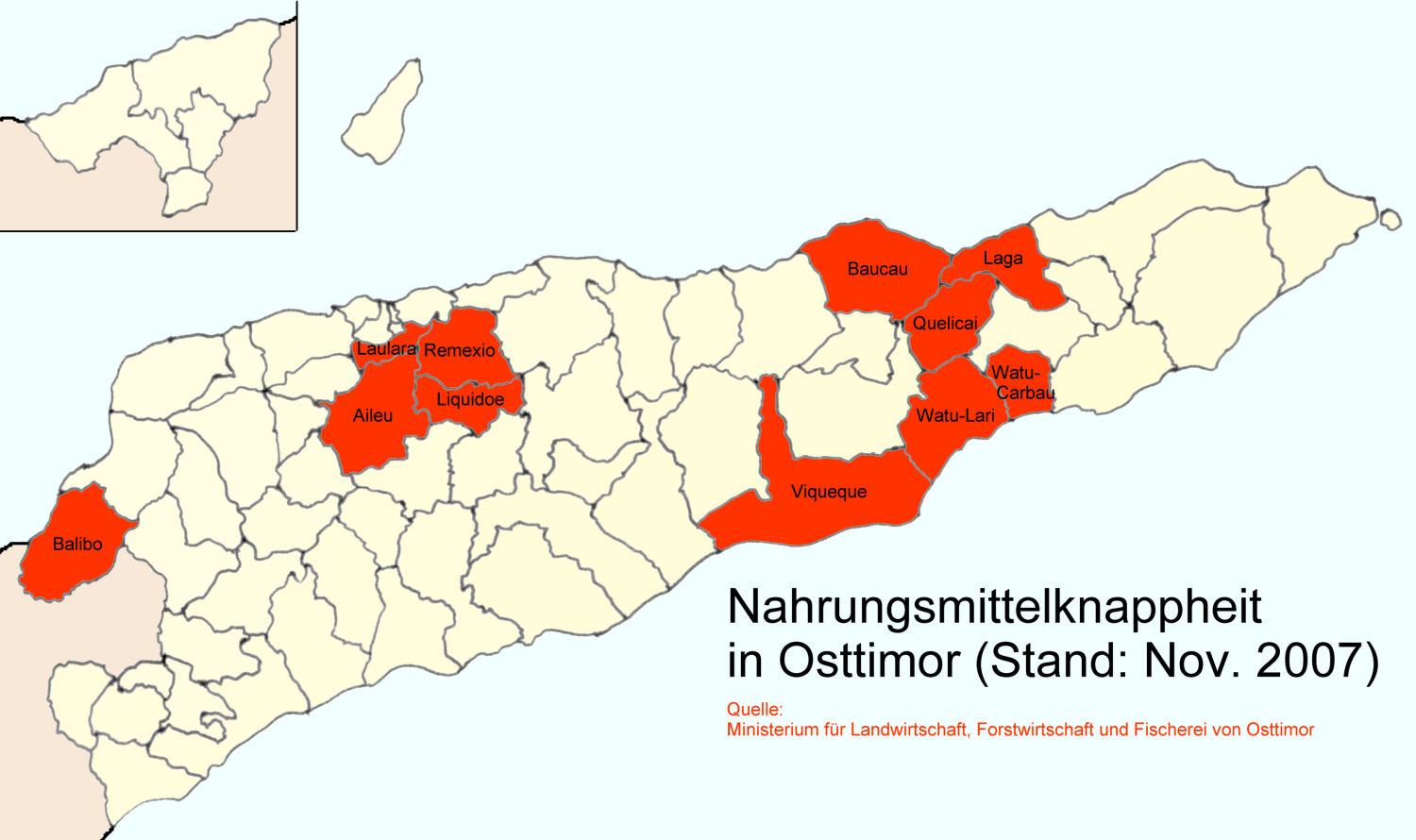
Subdistricts suffering from hunger in November 2007.

=== Food Crisis 2007 ===
Timor-Leste experienced extreme food shortages in November 2007. The UN asked for aid from a number of international organisations.

== United States ==
=== Electoral Process Development ===
USAID began supporting the development of effective democratic electoral and political processes in Timor-Leste in 1999. Between 2001 and 2008, USAID gave $2,215,997 to International Foundation for Electoral Systems(IFES), $3,619,134 to the International Republican Institute(IRI), and $3,728,490 to the National Democratic Institute(NDI). This money supported IFES in developing electoral framework and process, IRI in developing political parties, and NDI on increasing citizen participation and local governance.

== Notes ==
=== Major Sources ===
- ELECTIONS AND POLITICAL PROCESSES PROGRAM IN TIMOR-LESTE (PDF) (Report). USAID. February 2008. Archived from the original (PDF) on 31 May 2009.
