= International Foundation for Electoral Systems activities in Asia =

Election support missions in Asia

The International Foundation for Electoral Systems (IFES) operates a number of election support missions in Asia. Following their elections plus approach, IFES has participated in a diverse number of programs, both enhancing the governmental organizations that directly enhance elections and enhancing civil society through the endorsement of non-governmental organizations.

== Afghanistan ==
IFES has worked in Afghanistan since 2002 helping the country's Independent Election Commission (IEC). Also, the Consortium for Elections and Political Process Strengthening, an organization which includes other democracy promotion organizations, participates in additional programs in the country.

== Azerbaijan ==
IFES began cooperation with the Azerbaijani government through their central election commission in 2000. Their cooperation was renewed in 2002. In 2005, the Azerbaijani CEC had 2 IFES election observers registered along with a number of other international observers. IFES's support of the Azerbaijani CEC was praised by the head of the commission, Mezair Penahov. He stressed that IFES has "efficient cooperation with both international organizations in the direction of raising voter’s awareness and awareness of the members of lower election commissions." While coordinating efforts with the Azerbaijani CEC, IFES has consulted the UK based Association of Electoral Administrators.

When USAID reviewed its programs in Azerbaijan in 2009, IFES along with NDI both made proposals to continue work in the area. The International Republican Institute discontinued its partnership in these programs.

== Bangladesh ==
In 2009 IFES was commissioned by UNDP to take a series of surveys in order to check the accuracy of the digitized voter registration list in Bangladesh. The poll showed that 99% of the Bangladeshi thought it was accurate. This is an improvement over the previous undigitized system which had approximately 13 million ineligible votes.

== Indonesia ==
IFES helped establish the TV station Swara Channel in 1999.

A series of tracking surveys conducted by the International Foundation for Electoral Systems between December 2003 and late June 2004 showed the popularity of each presidential candidate among voters throughout the selection and campaign periods. IFES also conducted a tracking survey in the Indonesian legislative elections in 2004 which showed that not all voters knew how to vote for candidates for the new Regional Representative Council or were even aware of its existence.

Between May 2007 and October 2009, USAID contracted the IFES to implement a $2.45 million contract to support the National General Election Commission. IFES was among eight organizations that monitored the elections in Nanggroe Aceh Darussalam province during the 2009 legislative elections.

== Pakistan ==
In 2006, IFES implemented a 9 million dollar contract through USAID used to install a computerised electoral rolls system for the Pakistani government. This roll system, despite its new technology, is having a considerable number of errors. These errors appear to be the result of both mis-communication between the software developer, Kalsoft a division Khanani and Kalia International (Private) Limited, and errors in the programs implementation.

IFES also advised the Pakistani Election Commission during the 2008 elections. This election was delayed by the death of Benazir Bhutto.

IFES is helping with the election official training programs in Pakistan. Part of this activity was the establishment of a Federal Election Academy. This program includes the establishment of a library with the help of organizations such as USAID, NDI and UNDP.

== Philippines ==
IFES provided election observers for the May 14, 2007 elections.

IFES currently supports the electoral process in the Philippines. Leading up to the 2010 elections, IFES conducted a study that determined which populations in the Philippines were least likely to vote and began designing programs to increase voter registration in these groups. This program is funded by the British government in an effort to get marginalized groups, like indigenous peoples, the disabled, youths and women, ready for the May 2010 elections.

IFES and USAID support Citizens CARE, an organization that bolster election reform in the Autonomous Region in Muslim Mindanao. They are carrying out a program titled "Strengthening Electoral Process through Voters’ Education and Election Monitoring in the Autonomous Region in Muslim Mindanao”. This project is active in 1500 barangays in 80 towns.

== Timor-Leste ==
IFES participated in the USAID program to develop the electoral and political process in Timor-Leste, which began in 2001 and ended in 2008. The focus of IFES work in the country was the development of electoral framework in processes in the country.
