= Yousuf Mustikhan =

Pakistani political leader (1948–2022)

- یوسف مستی خان

President of Awami Workers Party
- In office 1 December 2018 – 29 September 2022
- Preceded by: Fanoos Gujjar
- Succeeded by: Akhtar Hussain

Personal details
- Born: Yousuf Mustikhan; 16 July 1948 Karachi, Sindh, Pakistan
- Died: 29 September 2022 (aged 74) Karachi, Sindh, Pakistan
- Party: Awami Workers Party (2012-2022)
- Other political affiliations: WPP (2010-2012); NWP(1989-2010); PNP (1983-1989); MRD (1981-1983); NDP (1975-1981); NAP (1970-1975)
- Occupation: Baloch political leader
- Known for: President Awami Workers Party (2012-2022)

Yousuf Musti Khan (Urdu: یوسف مستی خان; 16 July 1948 – 29 September 2022) was a Pakistani politician who was the president of the Awami Workers Party.

== Early life and education ==
Mustikhan was born in Karachi, Pakistan, on 16 July 1948. He got his early education from two schools in Karachi. He got his further education in eighth grade from Burn Hall School, Abbottabad. After three years, he came back and got further education from Karachi Grammar School and St. Patrick's High School, Karachi. He studied in Sindh Arts College, Karachi for a while and completed his BA degree in 1968 from Government National College, Karachi.

== Political struggle ==
=== Baloch Students Organisation ===
Mustikhan started politics as a student in the 1960s when he joined Baloch Students Organization while studying in Sindh Arts College, Karachi and became a Baloch nationalist. Mustikhan worked with Baloch Marxist leader Lal Bakhsh Rind who converted the Baloch Students Organisation to progressive political movement.

=== National Awami Party ===
Mustikhan, while living in Lyari, Karachi joined National Awami Party (NAP) with Lal Bakhsh Rind and witnessed many positive traditions of Lyari like the launch of evening schools in streets for hundreds of less privileged children. National Awami Party helped to promote political awareness, Baloch literature and culture in Lyari. While living in Balochistan, Mustikhan used to participate in underground activities of National Awami Party (NAP).

=== National Democratic Party ===
When formation of National Democratic Party (NDP) in 1975 was announced by Sherbaz Khan Mazari, Mustikhan joined NDP as member of its Central Committee and later, was elected as president of NDP (Karachi). Mustikhan also joined multi-party alliance called Movement for the Restoration of Democracy (MRD) formed on 6 February 1981, to oppose Zia's regime. Later, Mustikhan joined Pakistan National Party (PNP)(1983) as member of its central committee and later became the PNP (Karachi) president.

=== National Workers Party ===
In 1989, after Ghaus Bakhsh Bizenjo’s death, under the leadership of Mustikhan, Pakistan National Party merged with Awami Jamhoori Party to form the National Workers Party (Pakistan). Mustikhan served as general secretary of the National Workers Party.

=== Workers Party Pakistan ===
Communist Mazdoor Kissan Party and National Workers Party merged to form Workers Party Pakistan in 2010. Mustikhan served as vice president of Workers party Pakistan. He was part of the Sindh Progressive Committee (SPC), which comprised the Workers Party, Labour Party, Awami Party and other left wing and nationalist parties. He was also part of Save Sindh Movement.

=== Awami Workers Party ===
Mustikhan was member of its central committee when Awami Workers Party was formed in 2012. In 2016, Mustikhan was elected as senior vice president of the party.

On 1 December 2018, after the death of the party's second president Fanoos Gujjar, Mustikhan was announced as third President of AWP. Since then he was serving as federal president of party. As president of AWP, he was vocal on issues of land grab, land reform issue, housing crisis, women's rights, students' rights, forced conversions of minority girls, missing persons, and economic crisis of country etc. He was arrested and charged with sedition in December, 2021 while demanding very basic human rights for people of Gwadar in a protest organised by 'Gwadar ko Haq do' (Give Rights to Gwadar) movement in Gwadar, Balochistan. Earlier in March, 2021 his session was cancelled in Sindh Literature Festival.

In AWP's third central congress, he was elected again as president on 12–13 March 2022 in Lahore.

Mustikhan also headed Sindh Indigenous Rights Alliance which was formed in 2015 against the land grabbing.

Mustikhan also served as a central leader of the Baloch Muttahida Mahaz (BMM), a Baloch rights body, based in Karachi.

Mustikhan was selected as the first convener of the United Democratic Front, an alliance of left leaning parties formed in June, 2022 in Islamabad.

Mustikhan died in Karachi on 29 September 2022, at the age of 74, after suffering from liver cancer.
