= Aasim Sajjad Akhtar =

Pakistani academic

- عاصم سجاد اختر
- Education: SOAS, University of London; Yale University; Northwestern University
- Occupations: Associate Professor at Quaid-i-Azam University, Islamabad, Pakistan
- Known for: Deputy general secretary, Awami Workers Party

Aasim Sajjad Akhtar is a teacher, left-wing politician and columnist based in Pakistan. Akhtar is associate professor of political economy at Quaid-i-Azam University, Islamabad, Pakistan. He served as the president of the Awami Workers Party's Punjab executive committee from March 16, 2014 to January 17, 2020. He is deputy general secretary of Awami Workers Party.

== Early life and education ==
Akhtar did his Bachelor of Arts in economics with honours in 1997 from Northwestern University, Evanston, IL, USA. He got his master's degree in economics in 1999 from Yale University, New Haven, CT, USA. Akhtar completed his PhD in political sociology in 2008 from SOAS, University of London at the South Asia Institute, where his thesis was titled The Overdeveloping State: The Politics of Common Sense in Pakistan, 1971-2007.

== Career ==
Akhtar is serving as associate professor of political economy at Quaid-i-Azam University's National Institute of Pakistan Studies, and has previously taught at the Lahore University of Management Sciences. His research focuses on colonial theory and history, state theory, sociology, imperialism, comparative politics, political economy, rise of the middle classes, South Asian politics, identity formation, informal economy and social movements in Pakistan. Akhtar is Honorary Fellow at the Institute of South Asian Studies (ISAS), a research institute at the National University of Singapore (NUS).

== Political struggle ==
=== People's Rights Movement (PRM) ===
Akhtar was a coordinator of the People's Rights Movement (PRM) from 2002 to 2012; PRM was a left-wing confederation of working-class movements in Pakistan.

As a representative of PRM, Akhtar was a strong supporter of Okara's peasant movement and Anjuman Mazarin Punjab, (AMP).

He organised rallies under the banner of PRM along with members of different trade unions against anti-worker policies and privatization of public utilities.

In November 2007, he was arrested in Lahore with seventy other civil society activists for participating in an anti-government meeting held at the Human Rights Commission of Pakistan during the Pakistani state of emergency, 2007.

In February 2010, PRM merged with the National Workers Party and the Communist Mazdoor Kissan Party to form the Workers Party Pakistan.

On August 17, 2023, Aasim Sajjad Akhtar was interviewed by Democracy Now] on the "explosive leaked document obtained by The Intercept [that] appears to show direct U.S. involvement in former Pakistani Prime Minister Imran Khan’s ouster in 2022 because of his stance on the war in Ukraine. Khan is currently jailed and facing trial over a slew of corruption charges that his supporters say are intended to keep him from running for office again."

"I think The Intercept story is much ado about nothing, at least in Pakistan. And I'm talking about critical progressive circles. I'm not talking about government or the PTI or IK supporters. The truth is that IK fell out with the military, and that's the reason he was booted. I mean, what he really wanted to say was that "Bajwa wanted me out," but he couldn’t say that at the time. As the right tends to do everywhere, and IK is a classic example of a populist right-wing demagogue, you know, steals the anti — he’s not even anti-imperialist, but he, at best, could have called himself anti-American. Of course, we didn’t have the kind of — or, don’t have the kind of purchase, especially in the mainstream media, to be able to say, "Well, no, a real anti-imperialist looks and does, you know, X, Y, Z."

=== Workers Party Pakistan ===
Akhtar was associated with Workers Party Pakistan (WPP) from February 2010 to November 2012.

=== All-Pakistan Alliance for Katchi Abadis ===
Akhtar served as chairman of the All-Pakistan Alliance for Katchi Abadis (informal settlements or slums) which was an association of slum-dwellers from across Pakistan, formed in 1999 to protect the rights of the millions of slum residents across the country, against forced evictions and homelessness and to speak for the need for low-income housing in Pakistan. In 2001, under Pervez Musharraf's era according to the Katchi Abadi Policy 2001, kachi abadis were given orders to provide urban squatters security through re-settlement and regularization. Despite this policy, forced evictions of residents from katchi abadis continued which led to protests and demonstrations by the All Pakistan Katchi Abadi Alliance. In 2002, residents of four abadis were allotted plots in Alipur Farash under 'Modern Shelter Urban Programme', according to which out of the total 41 Katchi Abadis of the capital, only 11 have been recognized by the CDA, the rest were to be demolished without providing alternative shelter for the residents. Despite having pledged to transform Alipur Farash into a "model town" for the working class, the CDA failed to provide even basic amenities for its residents, development has remained incomplete for years. Female members of All Pakistan Katchi Abadi Alliance from Alipur Farash protested many times for provision of basic facilities.

=== Awami Workers Party ===
Akhtar is among the founders of Awami Workers Party. On November 11, 2012, the Workers Party Pakistan merged with two other left-wing parties, Awami Party and Labour Party to form the Awami Workers Party. He was member of the first federal committee, later on December 16, 2012, he was elected as general secretary of AWP Punjab. On March 16, 2014, Akhtar was elected as President of AWP Punjab in AWP Punjab Congress held in Lahore. While serving as the president of AWP Punjab he took part actively in organising the slum dwellers of the capital territory of Islamabad against forced evictions and moved a petition against Capital Development Authority (CDA) to stop evictions from slums. Akhtar was elected as deputy general secretary AWP on March 12–13, 2022 in party's third congress held in Lahore.

In 2014, hundreds of kachi abadis' residents along with All-Pakistan Alliance for Katchi Abadis, held protests against the Capital Development Authority's (CDA) plans to bulldoze katchi abadis in Islamabad. On July 30, 2015, the Capital Development Authority (CDA) along with rangers, police and local administration demolished dozens of houses in informal settlement of I-11/1,Islamabad which were built 30 years ago. On August 2, 2015, to stop these forced evictions and to find ways for urban housing crisis in informal settlements of I-11/1, Akhtar along with residents from Kachi Abadis, filed a petition in the Supreme Court for the case on the right to housing. The petition requested that the court declare the residents of katchi abadis of the capital territory entitled to the benefits conferred under Articles 9, 10A and 25 of the Constitution and the state is bound to provide the residents of katchi abadis shelter and other amenities as per the Constitution and the National Housing Policy 2001. On August 26, 2015, the Supreme Court of Pakistan ordered the federal government and other departments to stop further demolishing of houses in katchi abadi I-11, Islamabad.

As member of AWP, Akhtar always raised his voice against any kind of injustices anywhere in the country through seminars and protests, be it killing of peace activists like Sabeen Mahmud and Mashal Khan, attack on minorities, price hike, or non-coverage of progressive voices on media. Akhtar believes in the power of community dialogues on pressing issues, to understand and find their possible solutions so he took part with other AWP members in organising political schools and dialogues.

During the COVID-19 pandemic, Akhtar along with other members of AWP, led the debate on Universal basic income.

Since February 2022, he is raising voice against the possible displacement of kachi abadi dwellers due to construction of tenth avenue road.

In June 2022, he along with other AWP leaders formed a new alliance of left-wing parties with the name of United Democratic Front.

Akhtar is also leading a decade long weekly study circle on wide range of topics on economic, political and social issues to promote a culture of discussion, understanding and awareness among youth.

== Publications and articles ==
Akhtar writes a weekly column for the Dawn newspaper, he also wrote in Monthly Review, New Internationalist, Tanqeed, The Straits Times, Deccan Chronicle, Himal Southasian, The Asian Age and The High Asia Herald. As a researcher and academic, he has published many research articles in peer-reviewed journals such as Third World Quarterly, Critical Asian Studies, The Journal of Peasant Studies, the Journal of Contemporary Asia and Antipode. He is also contributing editor with the journal Socialism and Democracy. He has co-authored two books, while his third published book "The Politics of Common Sense" (2018) describes the evolution of structure of power in Pakistan over the past four decades. In 2022, he wrote his fourth book named "The Struggle for Hegemony in Pakistan: Fear, Desire and Revolutionary Horizons" published by Pluto Press.
