= Pakistan Steel Mills =

Steel production company based in Pakistan

Pakistan Steel Mill Corporation Pvt. Ltd.
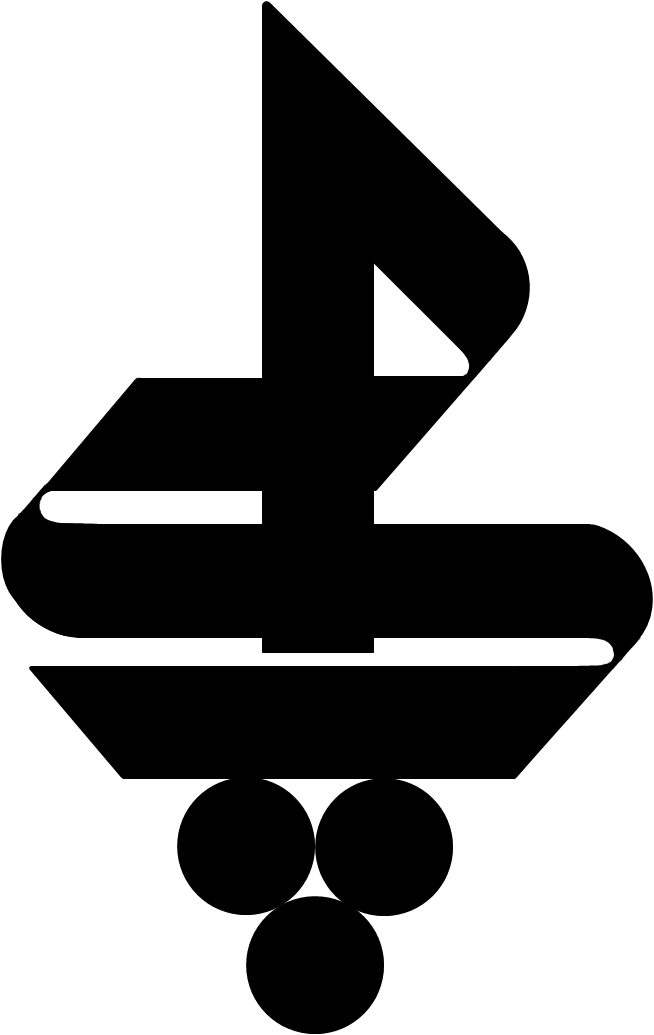
- Native name: پاکستان سٹیل ملز
- Type: State-owned enterprise
- Industry: Steel
- Predecessor: Karachi Steel Projects
- Founded: 30 December 1973 (52 years ago)
- Headquarters: Karachi-75000, Pakistan
- Area served: Pakistan
- Owner: Government of Pakistan
- Number of employees: 9,350 (2020)
- Website: www.paksteel.com.pk

The Pakistan Steel Mills Corporation, colloquially referred to as Pak Steel, was a Pakistani state-owned company that produces long-rolled steel and heavy metal products in the country.

Headquartered in Karachi, Sindh, the PSMC is currently the largest industrial mega-corporation in Pakistan, having a production capacity of 1.1–5.0 million tonnes of steel and iron foundries. Built with extensive contributions from the Soviet Union in the 1970s, it is among the largest industrial mega-corporation complexes, vastly expanded in an enormous dimension with construction inputs involving the use of 1.29 million cubic meters of concrete and 5.70 million cubic meters of earthworks, as well as containing approximately 330,000 tonnes of heavy machinery, steel structures and electrical equipment.

A controversial attempt was made to privatize the steel mills to global private ownership under the counter-measure Privatization Programme of Prime Minister Shaukat Aziz. However, these efforts were thwarted by the Supreme Court in Islamabad. In spite of its enormous size and expansion, only 18% of the corporation's capacity was in use, which prompted the PSMC to request a bailout plan of ₨. 12 billion to prevent its closure; the bailout plan was dismissed by the Government of Pakistan. Finally, the steel mills was brought back to government ownership and management under an inverse counter-measure Nationalization Programme of Prime Minister Yousaf Raza Gillani. Since then, its operational plant capacity has reached 30%–50% after seeking the government's financial assistance. One of the key reasons for PSM's downfall is widespread corruption after 2008 in management and CBA leaders, political recruitments, awarding of promotions and major posts on the basis of favoritism .

On July 4, 2023, the Government of Pakistan announced that it decided to shut down the Steel Mills as there was no available buyer due to the heavy losses it had been incurring for years.

== Employee layoffs ==
In June 2020, the Government of Pakistan decided to make redundant 9,350 employees of Pakistan Steel Mills. In November 2020, Pakistan Steel Mills sacked 4,544 employees, including divisional and assistant managers, due to its cost reduction exercise. At one stage during its lifetime, the PSM had 30,000 employees which has now been reduced to an estimated 9,000 employees out of which many employees had retired.

== History ==
After the creation of Pakistan in 1947, the Government of Prime Minister Liaquat Ali Khan realized the importance of the local production of iron and steel. Initially, the dependence on imports caused economic setbacks to the state in the form of high import costs. The initial idea and studies were conceived by the Council of Scientific and Industrial Research (PCSIR) and put forward the concept to the Five-Year Plans of Pakistan (1955–1960). In 1956, Soviet premier Nikolai Bulganin offered technical and scientific assistance to Prime Minister Suhrawardy regarding the steel mills and expressed interest in establishing the country's first steel mills.

The project was comprehensively debated in the governments of Prime Minister Huseyn Suhrawardy and President Ayub Khan. The manufacturing process, supply sources of the requisite machinery and raw materials, plant site, domestic ore versus imported ore, ownership pattern, product mix and all foreign financing credit kept the project on hold for a considerable time.

After 20 years of policy development and studies of PCSIR, President General Yahya Khan gave the approval of the recommendations of the state-owned scientific think tank, the Council of Scientific and Industrial Research. Bureaucrats and scientists agreed upon a unified decision that the "Karachi Steel Project" would be sponsored in the state-public sector, under which a separate corporation sanctioned by the Companies Act, would be formed.

In pursuance of this decision, the Pakistan Steel Mills Corporation Limited (PSM Ltd.) was commissioned and incorporated as a private limited company in a public sector in accordance with the Companies Act of 1913, to be established in Karachi, Sindh Province of Pakistan. Contacts were made with the United States but the U.S. government showed lack of ambition and interest in the project; therefore the studies were sent to the Soviet Union, which took the initiatives. The United States refused to give any kind of assistance.

Finally, an agreement was reached with the V/O Tyaz Promexport of the Union of Soviet Socialist Republics (USSR) in January 1969. In 1971, Pakistan and the Soviet Union finally proceeded to enter into a government agreement, upon which, the Soviet Union agreed to provide techno-financial assistance for the construction of a coastal based integrated steel mill at Karachi.

=== Labour development ===
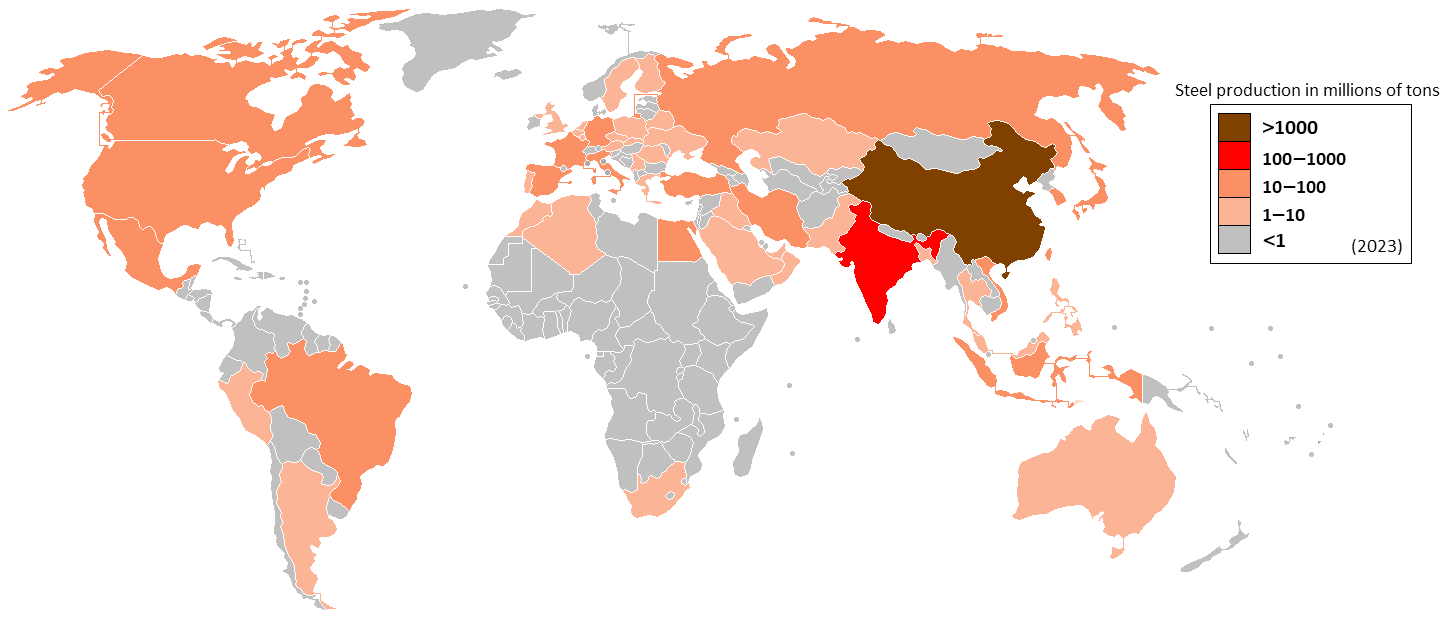
Pakistan Steel Mills listing with the nations capable to produce steel (10-50Mn tonnes of steel) and iron foundries locally

In 1956, Krupp industries of West Germany offered to set up a steel mill based on Kalabagh iron ore, coal and most other minerals available within about 18 kilometres (11 mi). The project was dismissed by the Ministry of Energy led by its minister Zulfikar Ali Bhutto who accepted the Soviet studies instead as Bhutto favored the idea to establish one single enormous steel mill based 100% on imported steel and iron ore instead of local ore at Kalabagh District. In June 1966, another West German steel firm, the Salzgitter AG, produced ~5,000 tonnes of quality steel from 15,000 tonnes of Kalabagh iron ore in the presence of some international experts, and sold it to Volkswagen. The company offered in August 1967 to set up Kalabagh Steel Mill of over 0.8 million tonnes per year capacity based on Kalabagh iron ore and imported coal at an estimated cost of Rs. 1.55Bn, including a foreign exchange cost of Rs. 878Mn. The European banks offered loans for this project, which confirmed the technical and financial viability of the project. All attempts were dismissed after projects were politicized enough in the civil bureaucracy.

The Pakistan Steel Mills was established as an integrated steel mill under a programme called the Nationalisation Programme in the 1970s. The foundation stone for this gigantic integrated project was laid on 30 December 1973 by Prime Minister Zulfiqar Ali Bhutto. The mammoth construction and erection work of the integrated steel mill, never experienced before in the country, was carried out by a consortium of Pakistan construction corporations under the supervision of Soviet and Pakistani experts. Khwaja Inayat Ullah was the Director of Operations & Chief Engineer of this project. (Blast furnace 1&2 & RMPP)

The main production units were constructed with a host of infrastructure facilities involving unprecedented volumes of work and expertise. Component units of the steel mill numbering over twenty and each a big enough factory in its own right were commissioned as they were completed between April 1981 to August 1985, with the coke ovens and byproducts plant coming online first and the galvanizing unit last. The commissioning of Blast Furnace Number 1 on 14 August 1981 marked Pakistan's entry into the elite club of iron and steel producing nations. The project was completed at a capital cost of Rs. 24.7Mn. The completion of the steel mill was formally launched by President General Zia-ul-Haq on 15 January 1985.

Soviet scientist Dr. Mikhail Koltokof flew to Pakistan and settled in the country to provide training to Pakistan's technical staff. Engineer Niaz Muhammad and materials scientist Wahab Siddiqui received training in Soviet Russia and trained thousands of scientists and technical staff. Their inspirations and innovations led them to earn the highest award from Pakistan, and also from the Soviet Union. The Government of Pakistan conferred them with Pride of Performance.

== Dividends and business assets ==
Pakistan Steel Mills not only had to construct the main production units for 2.2 MTPY, but also a host of infrastructure facilities involving unprecedented volumes of work and expertise. Component units of the steel mills numbering over twenty, and each a big enough factory in its own right, were commissioned as they were completed between 1981 and 1985, with the Coke Oven and Byproduct Plant coming on stream first and the Galvanizing Unit last. Commissioning of Blast Furnace No.1 on 14 August 1981 marked Pakistan's entry into the elite club of iron and steel producing nations. The project was not completed at a capital cost of Rs. 24,700 million and commissioned for production of 1.1 MTPY. Due to its infrastructure and enormous expansion capacity, it is difficult to determine the current value of assets of Pakistan Steel Mills, while others approximating the business assets reaching to then range from Rs. 72.5Bn to Rs. 100Bn of total value. By estimating, including the heavy machinery, dividends, facilities, and external and internal assets, the market price of the land of the Steel mills are exceeding the amount of Rs. 125.5Bn, as per the government estimates against the market value of Rs 945 billion as on 2006 investigation by potential bidders who withdrew from the bidding process for reasons not known.

The completion of the steel mill was forced to stop due to liquidity crises and formally launched after 12 years by the then-President of Pakistan General Muhammad Zia-ul-Haq on 15 January 1985. Pakistan Steel today is the country's largest industrial undertaking, having a production capacity of 1.1 million tonnes of steel and not completed to its lay-out design of 2.2 MTPY in a period of 40 years (1973 to 2013).

== Headquarters and production expansion ==
Pakistan Steel Mills is a large industrial complex located 40 km Southeast of Karachi at Bin Qasim near Port Muhammad Bin Qasim. It was found to be an ecologically preferable location, alongside a tidal creek and having a wind direction away from the city of Karachi.

Pakistan Steel Mills is spread out over an area of 7,550 hectares (18,660 acres) (about 75 km^{2} or 29 sq mi) including 4,205 ha (10,390 acres) for the main plant, 3,266 ha (8,070 acres) for the township and 81 ha (200 acres) for the 110 MG water reservoir. In addition it has leasehold rights over an area of 3,043 ha (7,520 acres) for the quarries of limestone and dolomite in the Makli and Jhimpir areas of Thatta district. It is one of the largest industrial complexes in Pakistan as well as in South Asia and due to its enormous expansion, the steel mill has its own educational facilities (see Pakistan Steel Cadet College and Pakistan Steel Institute of Technology), housing and residential programmes, parks and recreation facilities and police services apart from the provisional authorities.

== Environmental records ==
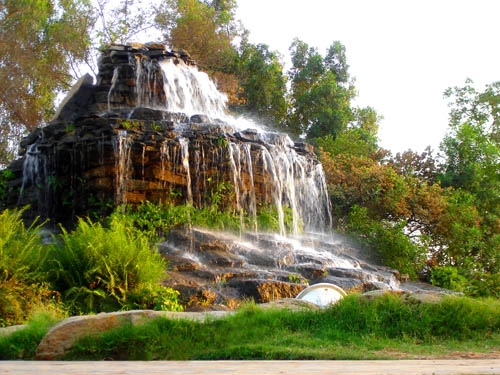
A park in Steel Town.

Due to its importance, the steel mills followed strict environmental policies regulated by the Environmental Protection Agency (EPA) of the Ministry of Environment (MoE). All health safety and healthy working environment is continuously regulated under a designed system. Pakistan Steel Mills, besides its core activities, has done a lot in making the environment in and around Pakistan Steel green and beautiful through the addition of three projects; the Quaid-I-Azam Park; The Quaid-I-Azam Cricket Park; and the Quaid-I-Azam Beach. The Quaid-I-Azam Park, which spreads out over an area of 18 ha (45 acres), consists of a series of six interconnected lakes, lush green lawns and grassy terraces, colorful flower beds, fountains, life-size steel-made models of wild and marine animals, a jogging track, a bird sanctuary and mini-zoo, as well as a children's play and recreational ground and boating facilities. The steel mill is also active in sports development and also has a football team Pakistan Steel FC that currently competes in the Pakistan Premier League.

== Privatization of steel mills ==
Since its foundation, the steel mills has been under the management of government-ownership and strictly put under the close coordination of civil bureaucracy. In 2006, Prime Minister Shaukat Aziz decided to integrate the steel mills under the intensified programme, called the Privatization Programme. When the news reached the rest of the country, demonstrations and spontaneous protests began to take place against the government of Shaukat Aziz and sparked lengthy debates in parliament, which members of the opposition walked out of in disgust.

The consortium involving Saudi Arabia-based Al Tuwairqi Group of Companies submitted a winning bid of $362 million for a 75% stake in Pakistan Steel Mills at an open auction held in Islamabad. The consortium including the Magnitogorsk Iron and Steel Works (Russia); the al-Tuwairqi Group of Companies (Saudi Arabia); and the Arif Habib Securities (Pakistan) paid a total Rs. 21.6 billion ($362 million), or Rs. 16.8 per share, to take control of Pakistan's largest steel manufacturing plant. Tuwairqi Group of Companies, one of the leading business concerns in Saudi Arabia, also launched a $300 million steel mills project at Bin Qasim. The group will set up Tuwairqi Steel Mills (TSM), a state-of-the-art steel-making plant in the southern port city of Gawadar, Pakistan.

=== Controversies ===
The entire privatization programme of prime minister Shaukat Aziz came to a halt when the WATAN PARTY filed a petition under section 184 (3) through its Chairman Barrister Zafarullah Khan in the Supreme Court of Pakistan vide SMC No. 9/2006 against the privatization citing irregularities in the process which was accepted by the Chief Justice of Pakistan Justice Iftikhar Chaudry.

The Supreme Court on 8 August 2006 held that the entire disinvestment process of the Pakistan Steel Mills reflected haste, ignoring the profitability aspect and assets of the mills by the financial adviser before its evaluation. The transaction was the outcome of a process reflecting procedural irregularities, said the 80-page judgement in the PSM case.

On 23 June, a nine-member bench of the Supreme Court had annulled the sale of the country's largest industrial unit to a three-party consortium and had directed the government to refer the matter to the Council of Common Interests (CCI) within six weeks. It had declared the $362 million transaction with the Russian-Saudi-Pakistan investors as null and void.

Authored by Chief Justice of Pakistan Justice Iftikhar Mohammad Chaudhry, the judgement said the entire exercise reflected haste by the Privatisation Commission (PC) and the Competitive Committee on Privatisation (CCP). The PC had processed 30 March final report of the financial adviser the same day and a meeting of the PC board and a summary had also been prepared the same day when a six-week time was mandatory to examine and fix a fair reference price for approval by the CCOP.

== Nationalization ==
PSM was deliberately destroyed by successive Governments to benefit the private sector Steel Mafia allegedly involved in more than $12 billion from 2005 to 2022 but persons at fault (beneficiaries & their facilitators in power corridors) remained unaccountable as yet. The privatization had the disastrous effects on steel mills, and it was lost by the private sector due to their inability to run such giant large-scale operations of steel mills. Under the private sector, the steel mill suffered losses in its net worth and declining of production capacity. The Economic Coordination Committee (ECC) was forced to approved a bail out package after the private sector, the Tuwairqi Steel Mills pulled off its investment from steel mills and instead established another steel mill industry to compete against the steel mill.

Despite all its problems, the steel mills is a paradigmatic employer and would rather see itself run into the ground than mistreat its long standing employees. In the midst of all the troubles that it is facing, the mill started issuing letters confirming their jobs and started producing the heavy steel and iron materials. After leading to an infernally long protest and inability proved by the private sector, the government of Prime Minister Yousaf Raza Gillani activated the nationalization programme after accepting the recommendations, despite protests lodged by the Finance minister Abdul Hafeez Shaikh.

In 2011, the steel mill was put under the management of government-ownership, expanded and re-structured. The board of directors would be restructured and expanded, from the current nine to twelve members as well as approving another bail out plan. In a matter of weeks, the private-sector voluntarily handed over the operations of steel mills to government-ownership management, a move that was widely appreciated in public society and workers' unions. Since coming under government-ownership, the steel mills infrastructure and available capacity was restructured and expanded. In 2012, Ukraine announced to provide technological development and help in the restoration of raw materials supply chain after viewing the performance of steel mills. The Ukrainian Ambassador quoted, "for major operational units of Pakistan Steel Mills is remarkable". The Ambassador of Ukraine Volodymyr Lakomov said that Ukraine is keen to make a business relationship with Pakistan and the steel mill PSM will be a "symbol of friendship" between the two countries.

== See also ==
- Socialism in Pakistan
- Labour Party Pakistan
