= Workers Party Pakistan =

Political party in Pakistan

Workers Party Pakistan ورکرز پارٹی پاکستان
- Abbreviation: WPP
- President: Abid Hassan Minto
- First Secretary: Akhtar Hussain
- Founded: March 20, 2010
- Dissolved: November 11, 2012
- Merger of: National Workers Party; Communist Mazdoor Kissan Party; Peoples Rights Movement Pakistan; Awami Mazdoor Anjuman; Watan Dost Mazdoor Federation
- Succeeded by: Awami Workers Party
- Ideology: Progressivism; Democracy; Socialism
- Political position: Left-wing
- Colours: Red and White

Party flag

Website
- Workers Party Pakistan

The Workers Party Pakistan (Urdu: ورکرز پارٹی پاکستان) was a left-wing political party in Pakistan formed in March, 2010 by the merger of National Workers Party Pakistan, Communist Mazdoor Kissan Party, Peoples Rights Movement Pakistan, Awami Mazdoor Anjuman and Watan Dost Mazdoor Federation.

== Formation ==
To link the national and international progressive movements (and to establish a democratic order in which elitist class can not dominate the politics and economy of the country), five progressive, democratic political parties along with different regional groups of trade unionists, intellectuals and youth decided to form the Workers Party Pakistan on March 21, 2010. Abid Hassan Minto was elected as president and Akhtar Hussain as general secretary.

== Political struggle ==
After its formation, Workers Party Pakistan kept raising the voice on issues like foreign debt, release of political prisoners, gun violence and human rights violation, fair electoral system and privatization of public utilities.

== Merger ==
Workers Party Pakistan (WPP) existed from March, 2010 to November, 2012. On November 11, 2012, the Workers Party Pakistan merged with two other left-wing parties, Labour Party Pakistan and Awami Party Pakistan to form Awami Workers Party.

== Notable members ==
- Chaudhry Fateh Muhammad (1923-2020)
- Abid Hassan Minto (previously from National Workers Party (NWP)
- Yousuf Mustikhan (previously from National Workers Party)
- Sufi Abdul Khaliq Baluch (previously from Communist Mazdoor Kissan Party (CMKP)
- Zahoor Khan (previously from Communist Mazdoor Kissan Party (CMKP)
- Akhtar Hussain
- Ismat Shahjahan
- Aasim Sajjad Akhtar (previously from People's Rights Movement (PRM)
