= Rahmatullah =

Rahmatullah (Arabic: رحمة الله) is a Muslim name, meaning mercy of God. Notable people with the name include:

== Given name ==
- Rahmatullah Kairanawi (1818–1891), Indian Muslim scholar and author
- Shaikh Rahmatullah al-Farooq, name used by Rowland Allanson-Winn, 5th Baron Headley (1855–1935), Irish peer and convert to Islam
- Chaudhari Rehmatullah Aslam, known as C. R. Aslam (1913–2007), Pakistani politician
- Rahmatu'lláh Muhájir (1923–1979), Iranian Bahá'í missionary
- Rahmatullah Safi (born 1948), Afghan military officer listed as the Taliban's European ambassador
- Sayed Rahmatullah Hashemi (born 1978), roving Taliban ambassador, who accepted a scholarship to attend Yale University
- Rahmatullo Fuzailov (born 1978), Tajik footballer
- Rahmatullah Rahmat, Afghan provincial governor
- Rahmatullah Raufi, Afghan provincial governor
- Rahmatullo Zoirov, Tajik politician
- Rahmatullah Hanefi, Afghan human rights worker, who secured the release of Italian hostages, arrested by Afghan authorities
- Rahmatollah Khosravi, Iranian politician
- Rahmatollah Moghaddam Maraghei, Iranian politician
- Rahmatallah Firouzi Pourbadi, Iranian politician
- Rehmatullah (cricketer) (born 1998), Pakistani cricketer
- Rehmatullah Khan, known as Rehmat Khan, Pakistani squash player and coach

== Surname ==
- Mian Muhammad Rahmatullah (1940–2014), Bangladeshi presidential aide, and Chief of Public Works Departments
- Shahnaz Rahmatullah, Bangladeshi singer
- Shahzada Rehmatullah Khan Saddozai (1919–1992), Pakistani tribal leader and politician
- Yunus Rahmatullah (born 1982), Pakistani held on terrorist charges

== See also ==
- Layton Rahmatulla Benevolent Trust, Pakistani eye-care charity
