= Naik Nam Karim =

Pakistani politician from Gilgit-Baltistan

- نیک نام کریم

Member of the Gilgit-Baltistan Assembly
- Incumbent
- Assumed office 22 June 2026
- Preceded by: Abaid Ullah Baig
- Constituency: GBA-6 Hunza

Personal details
- Party: Pakistan People's Party
- Other political affiliations: Pakistan Tehreek-e-Insaf (2026); Independent (2015-2016)

Naik Nam Karim is a Pakistani politician who has served as a member of the Gilgit-Baltistan Assembly since June 2026.

== Political career ==
Karim contested the 2015 Gilgit-Baltistan Assembly election from GBA-6 Hunza-Nagar-III as an independent candidate, but was unsuccessful. He received 3 votes and was defeated by Mir Ghazanfar Ali Khan, a candidate of Pakistan Muslim League (N) (PML(N)).

He contested a 2016 by-election from GBA-6 Hunza as an independent candidate, but was unsuccessful. He received 2,587 votes and was defeated by Shah Salim Khan, a candidate of PML(N).

On 7 June 2026, he was elected to the Gilgit-Baltistan Assembly from GBA-6 Hunza as an independent candidate supported by Pakistan Tehreek-e-Insaf (PTI) in the 2026 Gilgit Baltistan Assembly election. He received 6,429 votes and defeated Imtiaz Ul Haque, a candidate of Pakistan People's Party (PPP).

After the election, on 19 June 2026, he joined PPP, and was sworn in as a member of the Assembly on 22 June 2026.

On 27 July 2026, he was sworn into the cabinet of Chief Minister Amjad Hussain Azar as the Minister for Tourism, Sports, Culture, and Heritage.
