= Nationalisation in Pakistan =

Pakistani economic policies

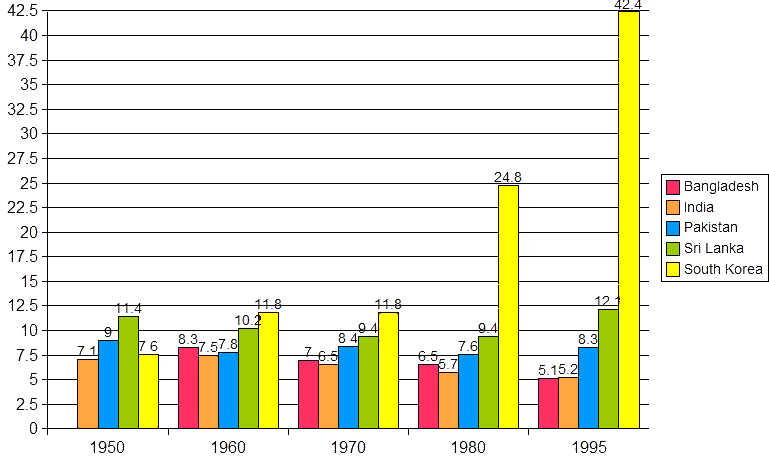
The total GDP per capita stood between 8.4% (in the 1970s) and 8.3% (in 1993–96), periods of nationalisation.

The nationalisation process in Pakistan (or historically simply regarded as the "Nationalisation in Pakistan") was a policy measure programme in the economic history of Pakistan that negatively impacted the country's industrialization and undermined the trust of businessmen and investors. The process was first introduced, promulgated and implemented by Zulfikar Ali Bhutto and Pakistan Peoples Party to lay the foundation of socialist economics reforms to improve the growth of the national economy. Since the 1950s, the country had undergone a speedy industrialisation. But, as time progressed, the labour trade unions and labour-working class had increasingly strained relations with the industrial business oligarch class, having neglected to improve working conditions and failing to provide a healthy and safe environment for the workers in these industrial industries.

The nationalisation programme began on 2 January 1972, with a vision to promote economic democracy, liberalisation, and an initial mainstream goal to put Pakistan in line with state progressivism. Ended effectively in 1977, the nationalisation programme was again put forward by Prime Minister Benazir Bhutto in 1996, and most recently by then-current Prime minister Yousaf Raza Gillani in 2012 who activated the programme to bring three major megacorporations (Steel Mills, Railways and International Airlines) under government ownership in an attempt to improve its structure and to alleviate its profitable process.

Despite its success in its formative years, such policy measure programmes met with an extreme level of spontaneous demonstration and international and national opposition that left disastrous effects on Pakistan's national economy and government takeover of private companies made Pakistan economy worst and investor's trust lost in Pakistan until it was replaced with the privatisation programme by later governments.

== Nationalization phase (1971–1977) ==
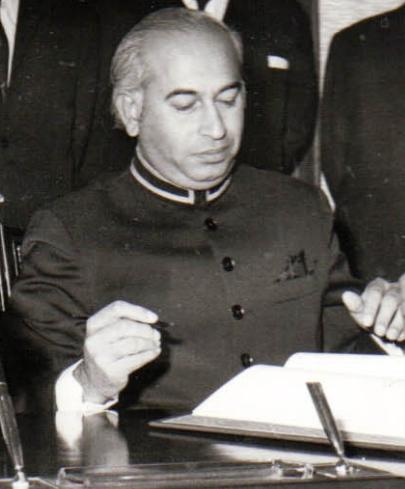
Zulfikar Ali Bhutto.

=== First phase ===
Zulfikar Ali Bhutto (1928–1979) became President of Pakistan (1971–74) on 21 December 1971 after a disastrous end of 1971 war with India. The nationalisation programme was implemented for the first time in the history of Pakistan and it was promulgated through three different stages. On 1 January 1972, on a televised speech to the nation, Bhutto and the peoples party's government promulgated the three-staged programme, under "Nationalization and Economic Reforms Order (NERO)", which nationalised all major metal industries, including iron and steel, heavy engineering, heavy electricals, petrochemicals, cement and public utilities except textiles industry and lands. The first stage of the nationalisation programme integrated approximately 31 major industrial megacorporations, industrial units and enterprises, under direct management control of the government under 10 different categories of basic industries. The programme intended to assert public ownership over the industrial megacorporations, and to satisfied the labour unions to keep the industrialisation peace in the country.

I had made a pledge to the people of Pakistan to implement industrial reforms.... I am now beginning to redeem the pledge....!

— Zulfikar Ali Bhutto, 1971, Cited source

A large number of Christian educational facilities were also nationalized in 1972. One example is Gordon College in Rawalpindi. In Peshawar nationalization of Christian schools happened under a later government. The provincial governor refused to implement Bhutto's policy. He did not want to disadvantage minorities in his province.

In September 1973, the Pakistani government nationalized the vegetable ghee industry, which at the time was a minor consumer goods sector with a total capital investment of Rs200 million. The Hydrogenated Vegetable Oil Industry Act, 1973 was enacted to the nationalize 26 private sector vegetable ghee enterprises with compensation to owners at breakup value or market value if listed on a stock exchange. Initially managed by provincial governments, these entities were consolidated into the Ghee Corporation of Pakistan after three years. Over the next three years, employment in the industry increased by one-third. However, this expansion was accompanied by mismanagement, leading to substantial financial losses. The industry reported losses of Rs24.3 million in 1974-75 and Rs29.4 million in 1975–76.

=== Second phase ===
After the success of the first stage, the nationalisation programme stepped into the second stage when it was launched on 1 January 1974, intending to nationalised the banking and financial industry and sector in Pakistan. Passed by the parliament, over 13 major banks, over a dozen insurance companies, two petroleum companies and 10 shipping companies were forcefully nationalised. The second programme was presided by Finance Minister Mubashir Hassan who strongly maintained that: "wealth of the nation must be used for the benefit of the nation and can not be allowed to be concentrated in the banks of a few individuals."

Banks ...which till (Monday) were the private property of a group are now public property.... All our big industries in the private sector were set up largely on the basis of financial accommodation provided by the banks and the financial institutions..... Because of the previous governments obsessions with GNP growth, (...)... industrial power was concentrated in the hands of few robbers barons

— Dr. Mubashir Hassan, source

On 1 April 1973, Bhutto held a meeting with members of Lahore Chamber of Commerce and Industry and maintained:

Activity of public sector prevents the concentration of economic power in few hands and protects the small and medium entrepreneurs from the clutches of giant enterprises and vested interests

— Zulfikar Ali Bhutto, source

=== Third phase ===
The third phase soon launched on 1 July 1976, small agro-based industries were privatized to facilitate the simple processing of agricultural products in rural areas. In July 1976, the government nationalized major industries, including cotton ginning, rice husking, and large flour mills across Pakistan, excluding those with foreign direct investments. This led to the nationalization of 2,815 units, comprising 578 cotton ginning, 2,113 rice husking, and 124 flour milling units. Properties under construction, residential houses with machinery, and even livestock facilities within industrial premises were also nationalized, adding to the uncertainty and administrative challenges.

In a reversal in May 1977, the government returned 1,523 small rice husking units to their original owners. To manage these nationalized industries, the Cotton Trading Corporation, Rice Milling Corporation, and Flour Milling Corporation were established, alongside the new Ministry of Agrarian Management.

Operational challenges were evident as the Rice Milling Corporation, in the fiscal year 1976-77, could only manage two-thirds of the nationalized rice husking units, failing to meet major operational goals and incurring a loss of Rs200 million. Similarly, the Cotton Trading Corporation managed fewer than half of the nationalized ginning units and was criticized for doubling its workforce within a year, contributing to its inefficiency.

=== Compensation ===
Initially, the Bhutto administration's directive was simply to "take over the management" of certain business units, leaving ownership with the original owners. However, this approach shifted in August 1973 when regulations were amended to allow for the acquisition of a majority share ownership in these units, offering financial compensation to the former owners. By November 1973, the government had issued orders to acquire majority ownership in public limited companies and complete equity in private limited companies. Further changes were made in March 1974, adjusting the compensation for acquired shares to be based on market value rather than the previously envisaged break-up value.

Originally, the policy did not specify any compensation for the owners. Although a compensation formula was later introduced, the principle of providing adequate compensation was never fully embraced or implemented.

== Denationalization phase (1978–present) ==
Upon assuming power, General Ziaul Haq promptly reversed the nationalization policies implemented by the previous Bhutto regime. General Zia denationalized approximately two thousand ginning mills that had been nationalized under Bhutto's administration.

In November 1988, Benazir Bhutto and the Pakistan Peoples Party came to power for a second time. During the election campaign in 1988, Benazir Bhutto promised to the industrial sector to end nationalisation programme and to carry out the industrialisation by means other than state intervention.

But controversially, Benazir Bhutto did not authorise the directives to carry out the denationalisation programme or liberalisation of the national economy. No nationalised units were privatised, only few economic regulations were reviewed. Although limited-scale privatisation continued under Benazir Bhutto's second government, the UBL Pakistan and railway consortium was completely nationalised by Benazir Bhutto before being dismissed in 1996. During the second government, the Peoples Party intensified the government control on Pakistan Railways and Pakistan Steel Mills; all shares were kept under government management ownership. In 1998, Prime minister Nawaz Sharif imposed economic emergency after performing nuclear deterrence in a direct response to India. All state-owned corporations and private sector industries' assets were frozen by Nawaz Sharif after ordering to freeze the private assets under government control to prevent the financial collapse.

From 1999 to 2010, the nationalisation programme was swiftly ended and effectively came to its end until 2011. The nationalisation programme was again promulgated by Prime Minister Yousaf Raza Gillani on 15 December 2011, in order secure and rescue the former state-owned enterprises. The nationalisation programme was put forward to enhance the government ownership of Pakistan Steel Mills, Pakistan Railways as well as Pakistan International Airlines. The current nationalisation programme remains intact to restructured and made profitable while remaining within government ownership.

== Opposition and adversaries ==
The GDP growth rate stood between 3.88% until being dropped to 2.84% after the completion of nationalisation programme.

The nationalisation policies had disastrous effects on the economy and had damaged the confidence of investors in the country. The nationalisation programme financially devastated 22 oligarch families, while one investor quoting: "industrialists not just lost industrial units to Bhutto's nationalization policy, they lost the urge to invest in Pakistan.". Those affected included Nawaz Sharif who lost the major steel mill, the Ittefaq Group of Industries, and Chaudhry Shujaat Hussain's Gujrat Enterprises. All 25 shipping companies were merged with Pakistan National Shipping Corporation by Bhutto's nationalisation programme; those who protested were imprisoned by the government.

At an international level, the United States fully opposed the nationalisation programme and marked it as "ill-considered" decision of the government. Former prime minister Nawaz Sharif, an affectee of nationalisation process, gave vehement criticism and cited nationalisation programme as "lamentable state of Pakistan". While on the other hand, the unnamed and anonymous United States embassy officer later further noted that:

During Bhutto's five years in Pakistan's helm, Bhutto had retained an emotional hold on the poor masses who had votoed him overwhelmingly in 1970s general elections. At the same time, however, [B]hutto had many enemies. The [socialist economics] and nationalization of major private industries during his first two years on office had badly upsets the Business circles... An ill-considered decision to take over the wheat-milling, rice-husking, sugar mills, and cotton-gaining, industries in July of 1976 had angered the small business owners and traders. Both leftists—socialists and communists, intellectuals, students, and trade unionists— lfelt betrayed by Bhutto's shift to centre-right wing conservative economics policies and by his growing collaboration with powerful feudal lords, Pakistan's traditional power brokers. After 1976, Bhutto's aggressive authoritarian personal style and often high-handed way of dealing with political rivals, dissidents, and opponents had also alienated many....

— U.S. Embassy, Pakistan, U.S. commenting of Bhutto's fate

== Responsive reasoning ==
The Pakistan Peoples Party's intellectuals on the other hand, vigorously defended the nationalisation programme. The Peoples Party maintained that the "nationalization" programme was indeed a "success" but the way it was implemented led to its failure. The Peoples' Party's members and cabinet officers, such as Dr. Mubashir Hassan, maintained that the Nationalization programme was party policy and the founding programme of the PPP in 1967, under "socialism is our economy" clause. Others supporting the arguments that the program was mandated by the people of Pakistan when they voted for PPP in 1970 general elections, and peoples party is proud of the successful implementation of the nationalisation policy, and the fact that nationalisation measures were protected for 10 years by the 1973 Constitution.

Started in 1970, the nationalisation programmes were precise articulation of that "self-consciousness" and "self-recognition" expression. The nationalisation programme completely abolished the monopoly and politicisation of economy under few hands that was kept in close drawing-room politics. The nationalisation program gave a though of "self-awareness" to labours, traders, and workers unions and to be more aware about the worker's rights and work healthy safe environment, as Suleman Akhtar maintained.

== Government reports ==
- Ministry of Finance. "The Banks Nationalization Act 1974, XIX 1974". Government of Pakistan.
- Riazuddin, Riaz. "Pakistan: Financial Sector Assessment (1990–2000)". Economic Research Department of State Bank of Pakistan. State Bank of Pakistan.

== See also ==
- Category:Government-owned companies of Pakistan
- Privatization in Pakistan
