= Abid Hassan Minto =

Pakistani lawyer, politician, and critic

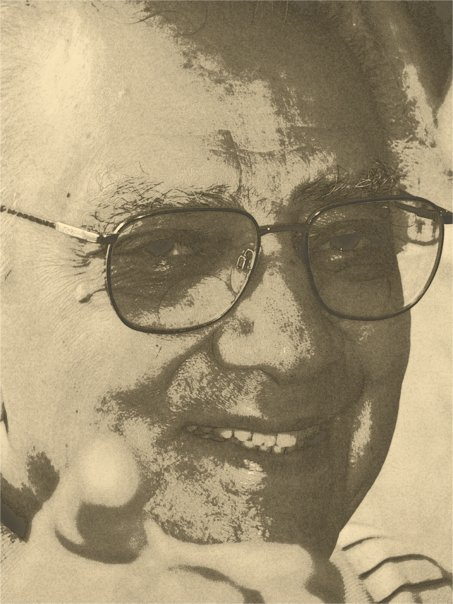
- Abid Hassan Minto
- Born: 3 February 1932 (age 94); Murree, British India
- Occupations: Lawyer; human rights activist; workers rights; activist
- Years active: 1949–present
- Known for: President of Awami Workers Party
- Notable work: Nuqta-e-Nazar (The Viewpoint) published in 1986; Apni Jang Rahay Gi (Our Struggle Will Continue) published in 2016
- Awards: Habib Jalib Peace Award in 2017

Abid Hassan Minto also known as Abid Minto (Urdu: عابد حسن منٹو) (born 3 February 1932) is a constitutional expert and senior lawyer of the Supreme Court of Pakistan, and former president of the Awami Workers Party. He is also a literary critic and leftwing civic and political leader. His legal career spans over 50 years during which he was elected member of the Pakistan Bar Council from 1973 to 1984; President, Lahore High Court Bar Association (1982); Chairman, National Coordination Committee of Lawyers (1981 to 1985) and President, Supreme Court Bar Association of Pakistan (1997 to 1999).

Minto has also been affiliated with the International Association of Democratic Lawyers (IADL) and was elected its vice-president at its Barcelona Congress (1990) and Bureau Member at its Cape Town Congress (1995).

He was professor of law at the Law College of the Punjab University (Punjab University Law College) from 1963 to 1983.

Minto belongs to the Marxist school of thought in politics and in his writings.

== Early life and education ==
Minto was born in Murree, British India, present-day Pakistan. He attended Islamia High School, Rawalpindi and Gordon College. He received his law degree (LL.B) from the Punjab University Law College in 1955. While at Law College, he was elected President of the Students Union and won and retained the title of "Best All Pakistan Debater" for four years. He served as the president of Law College's debating society and also worked as a writer in the college's official magazine "Al-Meezan"

== Political beginning ==
Minto became a member of the Communist Party of Pakistan (CPP) in 1949 and remained with it until it was banned in 1954 after the Rawalpindi Conspiracy Case along with the Democratic Students Federation (DSF) which was also co-founded by Minto in 1949 while at Gordon College. The DSF had been popular in all four provinces and was succeeded, after its ban, by the National Students Federation (NSF) which exists to date.

=== Trade unions ===
In his younger days Minto was an active trade unionist and organised the Military Engineering Service (MES) Workers Union. He worked for the Attock Oil Company Workers Union in Rawalpindi and the Railway Workers Union which was led by Mirza Muhammad Ibrahim, a veteran trade union leader of South Asia. Minto was a member of the Central Executive of the Pakistan Trade Union Federation (affiliated with the World Federation of Trade Unions) from 1967–1986.

=== Farmers/peasants ===
Minto's ties with local peasant movements are in place to date. Along with veteran peasant leader Chaudhry Fateh Muhammad, he has worked to organise Kissan (peasant) Committees (کسان کمیٹی) in rural Punjab. These committees provide local farmers with a platform for discussion and action in respect to the problems faced by them in Pakistan's agrarian society where ownership of land vests predominantly in big landowners.

== Literature ==
Abid Hassan Minto joined the Progressive Writers Association (PWA) in 1949. He has been active and associated with the Progressive Writers' Movement for many years. After the independence of Pakistan in 1947, he played a key role in establishing the first literary movement of Lahore, namely Halqa-e Arbab-e Zauq (Circle of the Men of Good Taste).

His first essay "The Issue of Language in Pakistan" was published in 1951 in the literary journal Adb e Latif (Urdu: ادب لطیف). Other essays by him, later published as a collection "Nuqta e Nazarنقطہ نظر"(The Viewpoint: 1st Edition 1986 2nd Edition 2003) include: The Problem of Religious Literature (Shahrah شاہراہ 1954); Literary Criticism (Adb e Latif 1954ادب لطیف); The Issue of Ideologies in Literature (Adb e Latif 1955ادب لطیف); Progressive Ideology and Contemporary Literature (Adb e Latif 1960ادب لطیف); Problems of Modern Poetry (Nayee Shairi 1964نئ شاعری) and Eternal Values in Literature (Auraq 1967اوراق). His essay The Technique of the One Act Playایکانکی ڈرامہ (Adb e Latif 1957ادب لطیف) was part of the curriculum for graduate studies in Urdu literature. Abid Hassan Minto's favorite writers are Rajinder Singh Bedi and Saadat Hasan Manto. Abid Hassan Minto also happens to be one of the grandnephews of Saadat Hasan Manto. He prefers to spell his family name as Minto rather than Manto.

== Legal career (1955–) ==
Minto began law practice in 1955 at Rawalpindi where his father and, before him, his grandfather had also practised. He moved to Lahore in 1958, was admitted, Advocate of the Lahore High Court in 1957 and of the Supreme Court of Pakistan in 1963. He remains a practising lawyer and is the Senior Consultant to "Minto and Mirza, a Lahore based law firm.

Minto conducted several cases of constitutional, political and legal importance. These include:

- The Ganga Hijacking Case: Minto appeared for one of the accused, Hashim Qureshi, before a special tribunal set up to try Kashmiri freedom fighters who had hijacked an Indian aircraft into Pakistan.
- The Hyderabad Conspiracy Case: Minto appeared before the Hyderabad tribunal to defend political leaders Abdul Wali Khan, Ghaus Bakhsh Bizenjo, Ataullah Mengal, Mir Gul Khan Nasir, Nawab Khair Bakhsh Marri, Syed Muhammad Kaswar Gardezi and others who had been charged with treason and for working against the Ideology of Pakistan.
- Farooq Ahmad Khan Leghari versus the Federation: Minto appeared as President, Supreme Court Bar Association of Pakistan to assist the Supreme Court of Pakistan on the question of the validity of imposition of Emergency and suspension of constitutional Fundamental Rights by the President of Pakistan.

Minto has appeared in a large number of cases involving issues such as:

- Section 295 C of the Pakistan Penal Code, aka "Blasphemy law in Pakistan", which prescribes the death penalty for defiling the name of Muhammad.
- The Islamic "Law of Evidence" or the "Qanun e Shahadat" which discriminated against women in that it considers their evidence as not at par with men in certain matters. This law was brought into being during the dictatorship of General Zia-ul-Haq.
- The controversy attached to the Law of Evidence gave birth to a women's rights movement in Pakistan calling for equal rights and equal treatment for women in all matters. (For more on Women's Movement in Pakistan see Women's Action Forum)

Some of the other issues in Minto's legal battles include:

- Constitutional right of workers to form trade unions.
- Electoral laws providing for a separate electoral college for minority religions.
- Discrimination against women preventing them from competing with men for admission to certain educational institutions.
- Dissolution of federal and provincial legislatures by the President of Pakistan and Governors of provinces.

== Law & Justice Commission of Pakistan (2012–2015) ==
In March 2012 Minto was appointed a member of the LJCP (Law & Justice Commission of Pakistan). The Law and Justice Commission of Pakistan is a Federal Government institution, established under an Ordinance (XIV) of 1979. The commission is headed by the Chief Justice of Pakistan and comprises 12 other members including the Chief Justices of the superior courts, Attorney General for Pakistan, Secretary, Ministry of Law, Justice & Human Rights and Chairperson, National Commission on the Status of Women and others. Each province is represented by one member. Minto serves on the commission as the member from Punjab. His tenure will end in 2015.

== Politics ==
Abid Hassan Minto is the president of the Awami Workers Party, formed in November 2012 by a merger of three left-wing parties in Pakistan. At the moment, he is serving his second term as the party's elected president.

=== Background ===
In 1967 Minto joined the National Awami Party (NAP Balochistan). The following year, at the party's general elections in Dacca, Bangladesh (then East Pakistan) he was elected member of its Central Executive Committee.

In 1971, on the eve of East Pakistan's separation from (West) Pakistan, a number of leftwing political workers from NAP and other groups, held a conference and founded the Pakistan Socialist Party (PSP). C. R. Aslam, a veteran communist leader was elected president while Minto was elected first general secretary. He stayed with PSP until 1986 and was elected general secretary three times.

Following a split in the PSP in 1986, Minto founded the Workers Party Pakistan in 1987. Later in 90's he formed Awami Jamhori Party (Peoples Democratic Party) comprising dissidents from the PSP and members of a Sindh based left group called the Communist League. On 1 May 1999, the Awami Jamhoori Party, Pakistan Socialist Party and a faction of Pakistan National Party (led by Baloch leader Ghaus Bakhsh Bizenjo) formed the National Workers' Party. Minto was elected its first President. NWP was a part of the All Parties Democratic Movement (APDM) in lawyers movement. Minto was elected first President of the Workers Party Pakistan, formed after the merger of five leftwing parties and groups (Communist Mazdoor Kisan Party, National Workers Party, Peoples Rights Movement, Watan Dost Mazdoor Federation, Awami Mazdoor Anjuman) and held office until November 2012, when the WPP merged with the Labour Party Pakistan and the Awami Party Pakistan to form the Awami Workers Party. At the founding congress, Minto was elected president of the new Awami Workers Party in November 2012.

The AWP (Awami Workers Party) held its First Federal Congress and second party elections on the 27th and 28 September 2014 and re-elected Minto to serve as president for the next term.

=== Arrests ===
For his political views and activities, and especially during the lawyers movement against General Zia ul Haq, Minto faced arrests and detentions several times. He was considered a 'prisoner of conscience' by the Amnesty International organization during his prison time.

=== International organisations ===
Abid Hassan Minto also worked together with Nelson Mandela from 1990 to 1995. Nelson Mandela was elected as president, International Association of Democratic Lawyers in 1990 and along with him, Abid Hassan Minto was elected as Vice President of the same organization.

== Books ==
A collection of Minto's essays mostly written during the 1950s and 1960s on ideological issues in literature was published in 1986 titled 'Nuqta-e-Nazar نقطہ نظر' (The Viewpoint) with a second edition in 2003 containing some later writings also. He belongs to the Marxist school of literary criticism.

Apni Jang Rahay Gi (Our Fight Will Continue) (published: 2016), is the most recent book by Minto. It is a compilation of articles, speeches, resolutions and interviews of Minto spanning over 65 years.

== Family and family name ==
The family name "Minto" was originally "Manto" or "Mantu" and is still used as such by most of the "Mantu" family. Minto's father Khawaja Ahmad Hassan (1896—1982), a well known civil lawyer in Rawalpindi was a leader of the Indian National Congress until 1943 later joining the Muslim League to play a role in its local politics during the Pakistan movement. Khawaja Ahmad Hassan Minto was a nephew of the Indian Nationalist Leader Saifuddin Kichlu who was also the paternal uncle of Minto's mother, Aziz Begum (1895—1981). The Urdu short story writer Saadat Hassan Manto (1912—1955) was Minto's great-granduncle. In 1961, Minto married Tasneem Minto née Kausar (1935--), herself a writer who has published a collection of short stories "Zara si Baat ذرا سی بات" ("A Small Matter"). They have three children, two daughters and a son (Bilal Minto), from their marriage.

== Awards and recognition ==
- Habib Jalib Peace Award in 2017, presented at the Karachi Arts Council.

== Citations/sources ==
=== Books and journals ===
- Mian, Ajmal. A Judge Speaks out. Oxford: Oxford UP, 2004. 131+.
- United States Joint Publication Research Service, United States, comp. Near East & South Asia. Rep. Vol. 92131.
- Human Rights Commission of Pakistan. State of Human Rights in Pakistan. Rep. 2002.
- United States Foreign Broadcast Information Service. Near East/South Asia Report. Rep. Vol. 84079. 123.
- Asian Recorder 16 (1998): 27143.
- Mainstream 27.27 – 39 (1989): 8+.

=== Interviews and world press updates ===
- Abid Minto Elected President
- WPP to Elect Minto as President
- Salvation of Masses
- Americanization of Globalization
- Christianity Today: Appeal of DeathRow Christian
- Associated Press Report in Sant'Egidio (in Italian)
- Interview with BBC Oct.8 2011
- The Express Tribune with The Herald Tribune. Report on All Parties Conference IBD.PK. Oct.6 2011

=== Television and videos ===
- Aaghaz (part1) ARYOne TV on YouTube
- Aaghaz (part2) ARYOne TV on YouTube
