= Bakhshal Thalho =

Pakistani politician and writer (born 1974)

- بخشل تھلہو
- Born: Bakhshal Thalho; May 1, 1974 (age 51)
- Occupation: Socialist political organizer
- Known for: General Secretary Awami Workers Party

Bakhshal Thalho (Urdu: بخشل تھلہو; born May 1, 1974) is a Pakistani, left-wing political worker, organizer and progressive writer. He is general secretary of Awami Workers Party.

== Early life and education ==
Thalho was born in Naseerabad, Sindh. He got his early education from primary and high school of Naseerabad, Higher Secondary Education (F.Sc.) from Government Degree College, Naseerabad in 1992. He got degree of Doctor Of Veterinary Medicine (DVM) in 1999 from Sindh Agriculture University, Tindojam.

== Career ==
Thalho started his career as veterinary doctor and served as President of Pakistan Veterinary Medical Association (PVMA) for 3 years till 2012.

== Political struggle ==
Thalho started politics as a student when he joined Jiye Sindh Student Federation from 1995 to 1997. In 1998, he joined Jiye Sindh Inqalabi Party.

Progressive Veterinarian Forum

Thalho was part of the Progressive Veterinarian Forum, Sindh.

Labour Party

Thalho joined Labour Party Pakistan in 2008 and elected as general secretary in 2009 till 2012

Sindh Progressive Committee

Thalho is also acting as convener of Sindh Progressive Committee. At the start of COVID-19 pandemic, he demanded establishment of free coronavirus screening centres in all divisions and free ration distribution.

Awami Workers Party

Thalho is organizer of the Awami Workers Party (AWP) and served as President AWP Sindh.

He worked for peasants' rights, women’s rights, political prisoners, enforced disappearances, land grab, students' rights, killings, inflation, flood affectees etc.

Thalho is a member of an interim joint action committee which-2020 to work for Sindh’s islands, health, education, and basic human rights.

Thalho has elected as general secretary AWP in its third central congress held in Lahore on 12–13 March 2022.

== Publications ==
Thalho was editor of magazine Adarsh in 2003 along with Asim Ali Akhund (1975–2008) (Labour Party member), later the magazine was named as Smajwad which is a Sindhi Urdu Bilingual magazine. He has written two books in Sindhi "Thakyai Thar Thelh" (2015) and "Tabdilia Jo Falsafo" (2017).
