= Abaid Ullah Baig =

Pakistani politician from Gilgit-Baltistan

- عبید الله بیگ

Member of the Gilgit Baltistan Assembly
- In office 25 November 2020 – 24 November 2025
- Preceded by: Shah Salim Khan
- Succeeded by: Naik Nam Karim
- Constituency: GBA-6 (Hunza)

Personal details
- Party: MQM-P (2026-present)
- Other party: PTI (2020-2026)
- Parent: Hafizullah Baig (father)

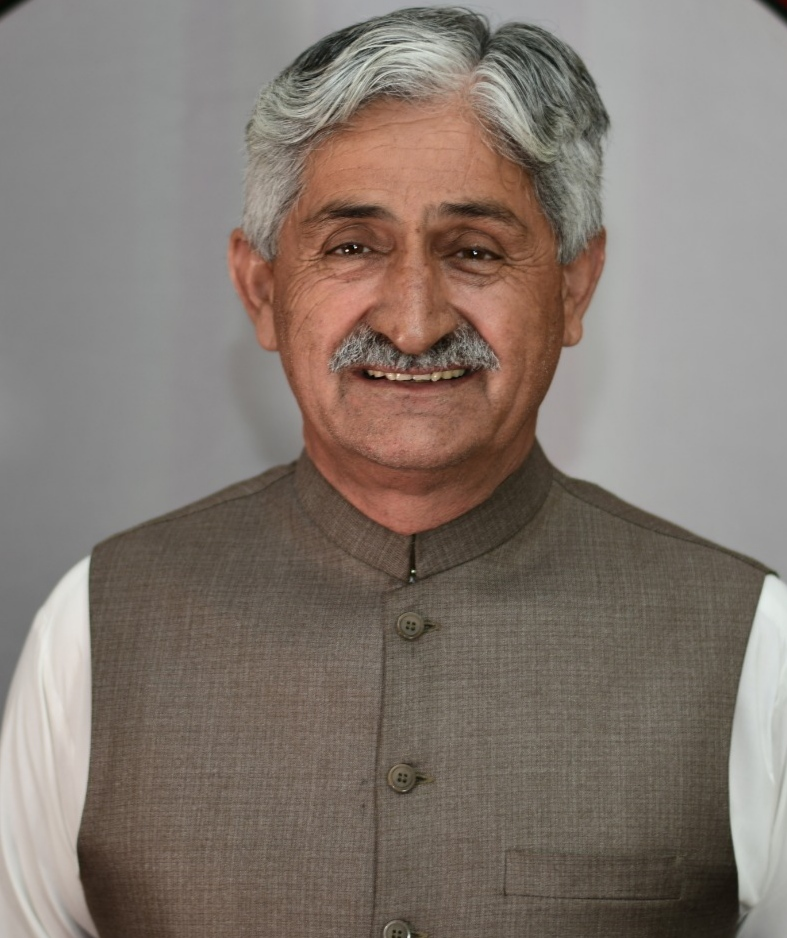
Baig in 2020

Abaid Ullah Baig or Ubaidullah Baig is a Pakistani politician who was a member of the Gilgit Baltistan Assembly from November 2020 to November 2025.

== Political career ==
Baig contested the 2020 Gilgit-Baltistan Assembly election on 15 November 2020 from constituency GBA-6 (Hunza) on the ticket of Pakistan Tehreek-e-Insaf. He won the election by the margin of 2,016 votes over the runner up Independent Noor Muhammad. He garnered 6,600 votes while Muhammad received 4,584 votes.
