= GBA-6 Hunza =

Constituency for the Gilgit Baltistan Assembly

- Constituency for the Gilgit Baltistan Assembly
- Region: Hunza District

Current constituency
- Created: 2009
- Party: Pakistan People's Party
- Member: Naik Nam Karim

GBA-6 Hunza is a constituency in Hunza District for Gilgit Baltistan Assembly which is represented by Naik Nam Karim of Pakistan People's Party.

== History ==
=== Constituency ===
Before 2015, the constituency was in the Hunza-Nagar District. In 2015, when Hunza was made a separate district, GBA-6 was made its constituency.

=== Candidates ===
Mir Ghazanfar Ali Khan of Pakistan Muslim League N for the session 2015-20. After appointment of Mir Ghazanfar Ali Khan as Governor, the political seat of the constituency became empty. His son Shah Salim Khan was elected in by elections of 2016. He was later disqualified by the honorable court being a bank defaulter in 2018. After disqualification of Shah Salim Khan the seat remained vacant till elections 2020.

== Members ==
Election	Member	Party	Votes received
2009	Wazir Baig	Pakistan Peoples Party	5,270 votes
2015	Mir Ghazanfar Ali Khan	Pakistan Muslim League (N)	8,245 votes
2016	Shah Salim Khan	Pakistan Muslim League (N)	4,525 votes
2020	Abaid Ullah Baig	Pakistan Tehreek-e-Insaf	5,624 votes
2026	Naik Nam Karim	Pakistan People's Party (Note: Karim was elected as an independent supported by PTI, but after his election, he joined PPP.)	6,429 votes

== Election results ==
=== 2009 ===
Wazir Baig of PPP became member of assembly by getting 5,270 votes.

2009: Hunza Nagar-III
Party	Candidate	Votes	%
PPPP	Wazir Baig	5,270	28.79
MQM	Kamil Jan	4,124	22.09
Independent	Noor Muhammad	3,703	19.84
PML-N	Prince Sher Yar Khan	1,360	7.86
Independent	Arif Hussain	1,098	5.89
PML (Q)	Rehmatullah Baig	734	3.93
Independent	Raja Shahbaz Khan	539	2.89
Others		746	3.99
Turnout		18,667	55.01
PPP win (new seat)			

=== 2015 ===
Mir Ghazanfar Ali Khan of Pakistan Muslim League (N) won this seat by getting 8,245 votes.

2015: Hunza Nagar-III
Party	Candidate	Votes	%
PML-N	Mir Ghazanfar Ali Khan	8,245	40.01
Awami Workers Party (AWP)	Baba Jan	4,641	22.55
PPPP	Zafar Iqbal	3,501	17.49
PTI	Izhar Hunzai	2,291	11.13
MWM	Sheikh Musa Karimi	1,041	5.06
APML	Aman Ullah	254	1.23
Others		40	0.19
Turnout		20,579	56.91
PML(N) gain from PPP		Swing	

=== 2016 ===
A by-election was held on 10 September 2016 due to the appointment of Mir Ghazanfar Ali Khan, the previous member from this seat, to the office of Governor. Shah Salim Khan was elected with 4,525 votes. On 9 April 2018, he was disqualified by the Supreme Appellate Court for being a bank defaulter.

By-Election 2016: Hunza Nagar-III
Party	Candidate	Votes	%
PML-N	Shah Salim Khan	4,730	28.86
Independent	Abaid Ullah Baig	4,077	24.88
Independent	Naik Nam Karim	2,587	15.79
PPPP	Wazir Baig	1,728	10.54
Pakistan Tehreek-e-Insaf	Aziz Ahmed	1,471	8.98
Awami Workers Party	Akhon Bai	1,438	8.77
Others	Others (four candidates)	357	2.18
Total valid votes		16,388	98.05
Rejected ballots		326	1.95
Turnout		16,714	46.43
Registered electors		36,000	
PML(N) hold			

=== 2020 ===
General elections were held on 15 November 2020. Abaid Ullah Baig, a candidate of Pakistan Tehreek-e-Insaf (PTI) won the election with 6,600 votes.

=== 2026 ===
General elections were held on 7 June 2026. Naik Nam Karim, an independent candidate supported by PTI, won the election with 6,429 votes. He later joined Pakistan People's Party (PPP).

Election 2026: GBA-6 Hunza
Party	Candidate	Votes	%	±%
PTI	Naik Nam Karim (Note: PTI members who contested in the general election ran as independent candidates aligned with the party because the Election Commission Gilgit-Baltistan prohibited the PTI election symbol.)	6,429	29.35	
PPP	Imtiaz Ul Haque	5,499	25.10	
Independent	Raja Nazeem Ul Amin	4,872	22.24	
AWP	Asif Saeed	2,904	13.26	
PML(N)	Shah Salim Khan	1,914	8.74	
Others	Others (thirteen candidates)	290	1.32	
Valid ballots		21,908	96.82	
Rejected ballots		720	3.18	
Turnout		22,628	43.32	
Majority		903	4.25	
Registered electors		52,237		
PTI hold				
