= Akhtar Hussain (lawyer) =

Pakistani lawyer (born 1946)

- اختر حسین

President of Awami Workers Party
- Incumbent
- Assumed office 2023
- Preceded by: Yousuf Mustikhan

Personal details
- Born: Akhtar Hussain; 2 February 1946 (age 80)
- Occupation: Lawyer, Senior advocate of Supreme Court of Pakistan
- Known for: President Awami Workers Party

Akhtar Hussain (Urdu:اختر حسین, born 2 February 1946) is a Pakistani lawyer, senior advocate of Supreme Court of Pakistan and left wing political leader. He is president of the left-wing political party, Awami Workers Party. He served as the General Secretary of Awami Workers Party from 2016 to 2022. He has been member of Pakistan Bar Council for 15 years from 2010 to 2025 and elected as Vice Chairman in 2012. He was a member of the Judicial Commission of Pakistan for two years from 2019 to 2021 and again from 2023 to 2025.

== Early life and education ==
Akhtar Hussain was born on 2 February 1946 in a farming family in the small village of "></iframe> Khai Kulia in Jhelum District. He received his early education from the village's primary school and got admission the fifth standard in the nearby town of Sanghoi, Jhelum. He passed his matriculation from the same school in 1961. He completed Bachelors in Commerce (B.Com.) in 1969 and Bachelor of Law (LL.B.) in 1972 from Islamia College, Karachi.

== Career ==
Hussain is a lawyer by profession. He started practicing law in Karachi in 1973. He was elected as General Secretary of Karachi Bar Association in 1985 and President of Sindh High Court Bar Association in 2005. He remained member of Sindh Bar Council from 1992 to 1998 and Vice Chairman in 1997. He stayed member of Pakistan Bar Council for ten years from 2010 to 2020 and elected as Vice Chairman in 2012. He was a member of the Judicial Commission of Pakistan for two years from 2019 to 2021. He was the General Secretary of Democratic Lawyers Association of Pakistan and Deputy General Secretary of International Association of Democratic Lawyers , an international organization of left-wing lawyers. As a student and after, he also participated in the works of Public Literary Association and Young Writers.

== Political struggle ==
As a student, Hussain joined the National Students Federation (NSF) in the 1963 when he got admission in Islamia College, Karachi. In 1971, he was elected as the President of Islamia College's Students Union and Vice President of NSF. He started his practical politics with the National Awami Party, once it was banned, he was the Deputy General Secretary and Central Committee member of the National Democratic Party and Pakistan National Party Sindh. In 1967-77, together with Dr. M. R. Ihsan, Lal Bakhsh Rind other colleagues, he formed the Communist League. In 1988, he was the Deputy General Secretary of the Pakistan Workers Party which was formed by the merger of the Communist League and the Socialist Party headed by Mr. Abid Hasan Manto. In 1992, the Pakistan Workers Party, Qaumi Mahaaz Azadi, and the Qaumi Inqalabi Party merged to form the Awami Jamhoori Party. In 1999, the National Workers Party was formed by the merger of Awami Jamhoori Party, Pakistan National Party and Pakistan Socialist Party (C.R Aslam), and in 2010, the Workers Party Pakistan was formed by the merger of the National Workers Party and the Communist Mazdoor Kisan Party respectively.

Hussain served as the General Secretary of Awami Jamhoori Party, Workers Party Pakistan and later Awami Workers Party formed in 2012 by merger of Workers Party, Awami Party Pakistan and Labor Party Pakistan. In March 2022, he was elected as senior vice president of Awami Workers Party but after the death of Yousuf Mustikhan in Sep 2022, he was elected as president. Hussain was incarcerated in the Central Prison Karachi in 1984, for struggle for democracy against Zia's martial law and then again in 2007 for independence of the judiciary under Pervez Musharraf's martial law.

== Publications ==
In 2021, Hussain published a book in Urdu: "Samaji Tabdeeli Ki Siyasat" (politics of social change).
