= Fanoos Gujjar =

Pakistani politician (1958–2018)

- فانوس گجر

President of Awami Workers Party
- In office 2016 – 1 December 2018
- Succeeded by: Yousuf Mustikhan

Chairman of Awami Workers Party
- In office 2012–2016

Personal details
- Born: Fanoos Gujjar; 1958 Buner, Khyber Pakhtunkhwa, Pakistan
- Died: December 1, 2018 (aged 59–60) Buner, Khyber Pakhtunkhwa, Pakistan
- Party: Awami Workers Party (2012-2018)
- Other political affiliations: Awami Party Pakistan (1990-2012); National Awami Party (1980-1990)
- Occupation: Politician
- Known for: Founding chairperson and president of the socialist political party, Awami Workers Party

Fanoos Gujjar (Urdu: فانوس گجر) (1958 - December 1, 2018) was a left-wing Pakistani politician from Buner, Khyber Pakhtunkhwa. He was the founding chairperson and president of Awami Workers Party. He spent his life in grass root struggle for the rights of minorities, workers, peasants, women and students.

== Early life and education ==
Fanoos was born in 1958 in union council Chagharzai, Buner, Khyber Pakhtunkhwa, in the house of Haji Zafar Khan, in a family of Muslim Gujjars. He received his initial education in the district Buner and graduation from the Buner Government College and later in Lahore.

In Peshawar, Gujjar contributed to the left-wing newspaper "Daily Shehbaz" and as editor of the newspaper "Jiddat" in Peshawar.

== Politics ==
=== Ideology ===
Fanoos Gujjar was a socialist and he believed in progressive politics. He was grass root organizer of politics of resistance and even with small number of resources, he stayed committed to the left-wing politics.

=== Political beginning ===
Fanoos Gujjar started his political career in his student life in early 1970s by joining, a left-wing students’ body, National Students Federation. He also remained part of the Democratic Students Federation and Pashtun Students Federation. In 1980s, Gujjar formed the "Gujjar Youth Forum" to help underrepresented Gujjar community. He also remained part of the peasant movement in Karachi and later joined communist party. During 1984-85, he worked with Khan Abdul Ghaffar Khan (Bacha Khan) and later with his son Wali Khan. He was arrested and faced imprisonments many times during dictatorship of Ziaul Haq. Under captivity, he was being tortured and one of his kidneys got severely affected, he was on dialysis for many years. He left the Awami National Party in 1988. He was part of Movement for the Restoration of Democracy and the National Awami Party.

=== Awami Party Pakistan ===
Fanoos Gujjar started his new political journey across the country in 1990s and brought people from lower classes together to form Awami Party Pakistan.

=== Gujjar Welfare Society ===
He belonged to the Gujjar community. He raised the network of solidarity to fight against the injustice faced by his community specifically students and youth. Gujjar laid foundation of Gujjar welfare society in 2000 with the help of students from Gujjar community in universities of Peshawar to help and encourage students from this community.

=== Awami Workers Party ===
Fanoos Gujjar struggled to gather three left-wing progressive political parties (the Awami Party Pakistan, the Labour Party Pakistan and the Workers Party Pakistan) at one platform to form “Awami Workers Party” in 2012 and elected as the founding Chairman of the party. He was elected as president of AWP in its second congress in 2016. Gujjar contested general elections 2018 from his native constituency, Buner, KP.

=== Pashtun Protection Movement ===
Despite facing discrimination in Pashtun society, Fanoos Gujjar raised his voice against the oppression Pashtuns faced and stood in solidarity with Pashtun Protection Movement. He was among the founder members of PTM (Pashtun Tahhafuz Movement).

== Death ==
Fanoos Gujjar had been suffering from multiple diseases and left with just one kidney for the past decade. He died on December 1, 2018, due to cardiac arrest. His funeral held in his native village Riyal, Union Council Batala, district Buner which was attended by thousands of people from all fields of life. After Gujjar's death, Yousuf Mustikhan was announced as president of Awami Workers Party.

== See also ==
- Awami Workers Party
