= C. R. Aslam =

Pakistani politician (1913–2007)

Chaudhari Rehmatullah Aslam
- چودھری رحمة الله اسلام
- Born: 15 January 1913; Shah Kot Tehsil, Punjab, British India
- Died: 10 July 2007 (aged 94); Lahore, Punjab, Pakistan
- Occupations: Politician, lawyer, trade unionist, journalist
- Known for: Co-founder, National Workers Party; President, Pakistan Socialist Party
- Political party: Communist Party of India (1940–1948); Communist Party of Pakistan (1948–1954); National Awami Party (from 1957); Pakistan Socialist Party (1970s–1999); National Workers Party (1999–2007)
- Spouse: Syeda Aslam (m. 1953)
- Children: 2, including Qais Aslam

Chaudhari Rehmatullah Aslam (Urdu: چودھری رحمة الله اسلام; 15 January 1913 – 10 July 2007), commonly known as C. R. Aslam, was a Pakistani politician, lawyer, trade unionist and journalist associated with the country's communist and socialist movements for nearly seven decades.

== Early life and education ==
Aslam was born on 15 January 1913 in Shah Kot Tehsil in Punjab Province (British India); the area now lies within Nankana Sahib District. He completed his schooling at Sangla Hill in 1930, where his teacher Abdul Hakeem introduced him to oriental studies and, in particular, Persian poetry. He received his LLB degree in 1936, and sat his Bachelor of Arts examinations as a private candidate in Sheikhupura before subsequently undertaking an Master of Economics in economics at Lahore.

During his student years Aslam became closely associated with the poet Allama Iqbal, whose evening gatherings he attended; his circle of young Muslim contemporaries at their shared Railway Road residence included Hameed Nizami, Abdul Sattar Niazi, Shabbar Hassan and Mian Shafi (Meem Sheen). In 1936 the declaration for the weekly newspaper Nawa-i-Waqt was registered in his name. He later attributed his intellectual shift towards communism to Marx's Wage Labour and Capital and Lenin's State and Revolution.

== Political career ==
=== Communist Party ===
Aslam joined the Communist Party of India (CPI) in 1940, mentored by figures such as Ajoy Ghosh, Sardar Teja Singh and Feroz ud-Din Mansoor. Following the Partition of 1947, his membership transferred to the newly founded Communist Party of Pakistan.

Although his own background drew him to work among the peasantry, the party directed him to undertake trade union organising, which he pursued until his arrest in 1948. He was detained again in 1951 in connection with the Rawalpindi conspiracy, in which numerous left-wing activists were implicated. The Communist Party of Pakistan was banned in 1954.

Between 1948 and 1954, Aslam made repeated attempts to publish at least four weekly newspapers, each of which was reportedly suppressed by government order.

=== National Awami Party ===
Following the ban on the Communist Party, Aslam joined the National Awami Party (NAP), emerging as a prominent figure within its Bhashani faction in West Pakistan; by January 1970 he was serving as president of the NAP (Bhashani) for West Pakistan. He did not align himself with either side of the Pro-Peking/Pro-Moscow division within the international communist movement.

In 1969 he launched the weekly Awami Jamhuriat (lit. 'People's Democracy'), which, according to contemporaries, served as a training publication for successive generations of political workers.

=== Pakistan Socialist Party ===
In 1970, Aslam was among the founders of the Pakistan Socialist Party, of which he subsequently served as president; the lawyer Abid Hassan Minto served as its secretary-general. The Post records that Aslam dedicated much of the decade to organising peasant conferences across Pakistan and to advocating provincial autonomy.

During the government of Zulfikar Ali Bhutto, Awami Jamhuriat was banned after Aslam published an editorial supporting the political demands of Baloch nationalists, for which he was imprisoned. He was reported to have declined repeated overtures from Bhutto to join the Pakistan Peoples Party, and was detained again during the subsequent government of Muhammad Zia-ul-Haq.

=== National Workers Party ===
In 1999, Aslam was among the founders of the National Workers Party (NWP) and served as a member of its Central Committee.

== Personal life ==
Aslam married Syeda Aslam in 1953, while he was detained at Lahore Central Jail. The couple had twin sons, Qais and Sufian, who became academics in economics and nuclear physics respectively.

== Death ==
Aslam died in Lahore on the evening of 10 July 2007, after a month-long illness during which, according to his son Qais Aslam, he had lost consciousness two days before his death. His funeral was held at his residence on Temple Road, Park Lane, Lahore.

The obituary published in The Post described him as having authored more than a dozen books.
