= Tenants Association of Punjab =

The Tenants Association of Punjab (AMP, Anjuman Muzareen Punjab) represents almost 100,000 peasants in the Punjab province of Pakistan, who work and live on Pakistani government- and military-owned land, managed by the Punjab Seed Corporation.

The peasants had been working the land since 1900, under British rule, mostly under a crop share agreement. This agreement continued after independence. The military and the government of Pakistan imposed a cash rent on the farm land, which the peasants tried to resist. There has been a dispute between the military who own the land and the peasants, which has led to military action, imprisoning and killing various members of AMP.

The Chairman, Younis Iqbal, and others were arrested in 2001. At the time of their arrest, another faction was brought forward, supported by the Peoples' Rights Movement and the Labour Party Pakistan. The AMP General Secretary Meher Abdul Sattar was arrested again under the Section 16 of the Maintenance of Public Order Ordinance (MPO) in 2016.
