= Shah Salim Khan =

- شاہ سلیم خان
- Born: 29 July 1975 (age 51); Baltit Hunza
- Education: International School of Islamabad, Bentley College
- Occupations: Entrepreneur and politician
- Known for: Disqualified member of the Gilgit-Baltistan Legislative Assembly
- Father: Mir Ghazanfar Ali Khan, the 6th Governor of Gilgit-Baltistan,

Shah Salim Khan (born 29 July 1975) is a former Pakistani politician and entrepreneur disqualified from the Gilgit-Baltistan Legislative Assembly for having defaulted on a loan by the National Bank of Pakistan. He is the son of the 6th Governor of Gilgit-Baltistan, Mir Ghazanfar Ali Khan.

== Early life and education ==
Salim Khan was born in Rawalpindi and raised in Islamabad. His father, Mir Ghazanfar Ali Khan was the 6th Governor of Gilgit-Baltistan.

== Career ==
=== Entrepreneurship ===
He was the former vice chairman of Pak China Sust Port Company Private Limited.

=== Politics ===
Salim Khan was an elected member of the Gilgit-Baltistan Legislative Assembly in the 2016 election. He won the seat on 10 September 2016 that had been vacated by his father, from GBLA-6 within Hunza Independent district on PML(N) ticket. In 2018 he was disqualified from being a member of the assembly after the National Bank of Pakistan petitioned for his disqualification in 2017, a year after his election. Khan had reportedly took over 50 million Rs loan from the National Bank of Pakistan during his term as Director of the Sost Dry Port, but he was failed to return the bank loan.

A decision was announced in open court on 9 April 2018 to de-notify Khan as member of parliament and instruct the scheduling of a new by-election in accordance with law.

He contested the 2026 Gilgit Baltistan Assembly election from GBA-6 Hunza as a candidate of PML(N), but was unsuccessful. He received 1,914 votes, placing fifth, and was defeated by Naik Nam Karim, an independent candidate supported by Pakistan Tehreek-e-Insaf (PTI).

== Property dispute ==
In June 2018, Khan was arrested and detained following accusations of vandalism and hooliganism. The complaints were made by his own mother Rani Atiqa Ghazanfar, who he has engaged in a long running property dispute.

In October 2018, his father Mir Ghazanfar Ali Khan declared him to be disobedient and disinherited him from his share of the family properties located in Islamabad and Hunza, Gilgit (Naltar).
