= Awami Workers Party =

Awami Workers' Party عوامی ورکرز پارٹی
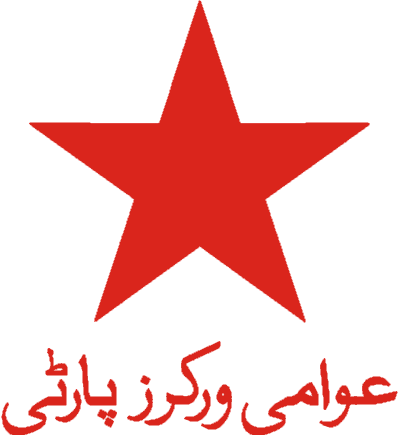
- Abbreviation: AWP
- President: Akhtar Hussain
- General Secretary: Farhat Abbas
- Senior Vice President: Javed Akhtar
- Deputy General Secretary: Aasim Sajjad Akhtar
- Education Secretary: Prof. Shah Jahan
- Finance Secretary: Zahid Pervaiz
- Information Secretary: Asar Imam
- Founded: November 11, 2012; 13 years ago
- Merger of: Labour Party Pakistan; Workers Party Pakistan; Awami Party Pakistan
- Headquarters: Karachi
- Ideology: Democratic socialism Progressivism
- Political position: Left-wing
- National affiliation: Left Democratic Front
- Colors: Red, White
- Senate: 0 / 96
- National Assembly: 0 / 336

Election symbol

Party flag
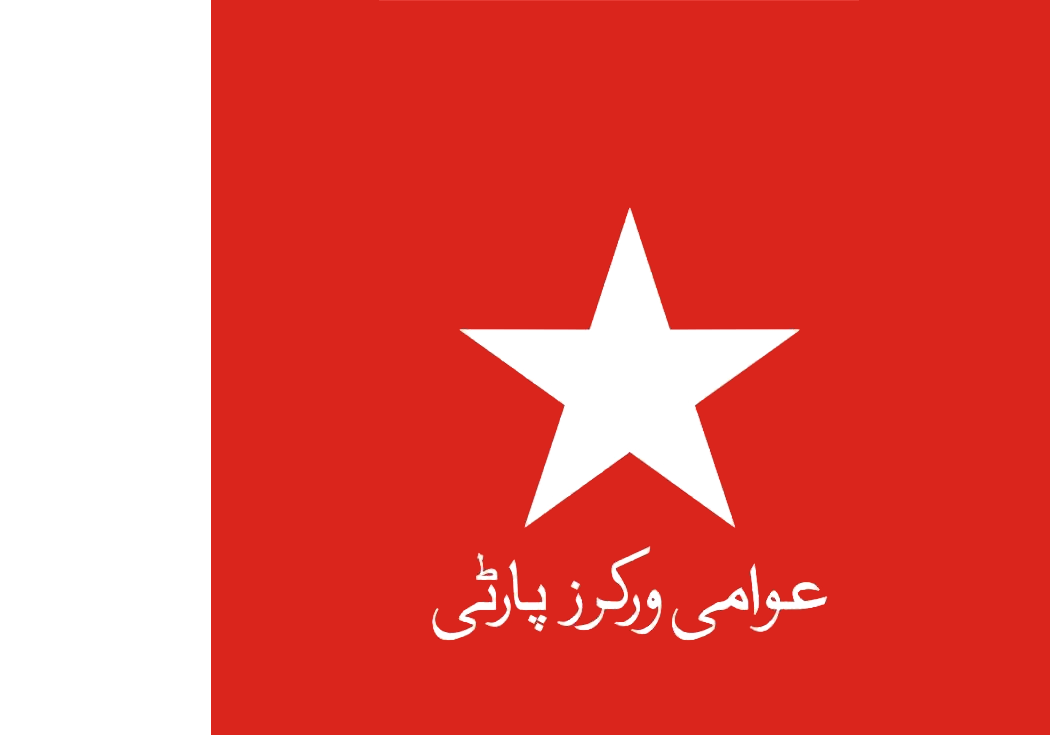

Website
- www.awppakistan.org

The Awami Workers Party (Urdu: عوامی ورکرز پارٹی) is a left-wing socialist political party in Pakistan. The party seeks to unify the struggles of workers, peasants, students, women and ethnic and religious minorities in Pakistan under the banner of a democratic and socialist political system. Abid Hassan Minto was elected its first President at the party's foundation congress held in Lahore on 11 November 2012, and first congress held in Islamabad on 27–28 September 2014. Fanoos Gujjar was elected its president at 2nd congress held in Karachi on 15–16 October 2016. After the death of the AWP's founding leader Fanoos Gujjar in 2018, Senior Vice President Yousuf Mustikhan became its president. He was elected President of the Awami Workers Party at its 3rd Congress held in Lahore on 12–13 March 2023, but after the death of Yousuf Mustikhan in September 2022, Akhtar Hussain was elected as president at 4th congress held in Lahore on 26–27 April 2025 alongside the Pakistan Muslim League (Nawaz) (PML–N), the Pakistan People's Party (PPP), Pakistan Tehreek-e-Insaf (PTI).

The party recently faced a split, with AWP-M led by Aasim Sajjad Akhtar, and Bakshal Thalho. See below.

== History ==
=== Foundation ===
The party was formed on November 11, 2012, as a merger of Labour Party Pakistan, Workers Party Pakistan and Awami Party Pakistan. While not the first attempt to unify the Left, the AWP generated excitement among progressives due to its promise of building upon the left's best traditions and making adaptations necessary for a viable project.

=== Federal Congress ===
The party held its First Federal Congress on September 27–28, 2014 in Islamabad and elected its national leadership following sub-national party elections around the country. Abid Hassan Minto was elected as president, Fanoos Gujjar as chairman and Farooq Tariq as general secretary.

The Second Federal Congress was held on October 15–16, 2016 in Karachi. Fanoos Gujjar, was elected as the president and Akhter Hussain (former president Sindh Bar Council) as general secretary.

Third central party congress was held on 12–13 March 2022 in Lahore in which Yousuf Mustikhan was elected as president, Akhtar Hussain as Senior Vice President, Bakhshal Thalho as general secretary and Aasim Sajjad Akhtar as deputy general secretary.

Fourth Delegate Congress was held on 26–27 April 2025 at Lahore in which Akhtar Hussain was elected as the President, Javed Akhtar as Senior Vice President, Farhat Abbas as general Secretary and Yousaf Kakar as Deputy Secretary General, Ahtisham Akbar as Secretary Youth / Students, Zahid Pervez as Secretary Finance, Asar Imam as Secretary Information, Abida Chaudhary as Secretary Women, Mohammad Jamil as Secretary Labour, Iqbal Malik as Secretary Kisan / Harri, Dalawar Abbas as Secretary Art & Culture, Prof. Shah Jahan as Secretary Education, Pervez Fateh as Secretary International Affairs.

=== General elections 2013 ===
In the 2013 Pakistani general election, the party received 18,650 votes or 0.04% of the national share.

=== Elections 2015 ===
AWP took part in the 2015 elections in Gilgit-Baltistan. Baba Jan was AWP's candidate in GBLA-6 constituency. Jan came second to PMLN's Mir Gazanfar Ali. New elections in GBLA-6 were expected to be held in September 2016 after the seat became vacant on Mir Gazanfar's appointment as Governor. However, Baba Jan's paper was rejected. Akhun Bhai contested the by polls in place of Baba Jan.

=== General Elections 2018 ===
In the 2018 Pakistani general election, AWP received 35,870 votes. In July, 2018, at the Karachi Press Club, secretary general, advocate Akhtar Hussain, and senior vice president Yousuf Mustikhan, issued the party's 10-point agenda as their manifesto. The main focus of manifesto was abolishing the medieval tribal and feudal system in the country.

From the federal capital Islamabad, Ammar Rashid (former president AWP Punjab) ran for the National Assembly seat NA-53 and Ismat Shahjahan (deputy general secretary AWP), for the National Assembly seat NA-54.

Fanoos Gujjar contested elections from his native constituency, Buner in Khyber Pakhtunkhwa.

=== GB Elections 2020 ===
In the 2020 GB Elections, Baba Jan submitted papers as primary candidate for the GBA-6 Hunza seat and Asif Saeed Sakhi as Jan's covering candidate. Jan's candidature was rejected and Sakhi contested the elections on AWP ticket. He got 2,612 votes and came fifth in the polls.

=== General Elections 2024 ===
In the 2024 General Elections, AWP nominated Iqbal Jahan for NA-47. He received 148 votes and 20th position in the polls

== Notable Events ==
=== Blocking of Party's Website ===
AWP's website was blocked on June 3, 2018. On June 6, 2018, party submitted application to Election Commission of Pakistan to urgently remove the block from party's official website. On February 18, 2019, AWP filed a petition in Islamabad High Court (IHC) against censorship of its website by Pakistan Telecommunication Authority (PTA). On September 12, 2019, the IHC ruled that the blocking of website was in violation of natural justice according to Article 10-A in the Constitution of Pakistan.

=== Decease of Fanoos Gujjar ===
Fanoos Gujjar, the founding member of AWP and served as chairman of the party from 2012 to 2016, and president of the party from 2016 till his death. He died on December 1, 2018, due to cardiac arrest in his native village Riyal, Union Council Batala, district Buner. He was suffering from multiple diseases and was left with just one kidney for the last ten years of his life

=== Departure of LPP member ===
In October 2019, one member of Labour Party announced its resignation from the AWP. LPP leader and former AWP General Secretary Farooq Tariq alleged that his group was being "witch-hunted" in the party, and said that the party had been reluctant to work with farmers, workers and democratic movements, or to campaign for the release of political prisoner Baba Jan, a leading AWP member.

=== Release of Baba Jan and other workers ===
Baba Jan (former vice-president AWP and currently a member of the Federal Committee) was sentenced to 71 years in jail along with 14 people by the Gilgit-Baltistan courts; they were tried for charges of terrorism for inciting public against the state during the Aliabad incident. He was released from jail after nine years on November 27, 2020, after a week-long Aliabad sit-in by the families of the prisoners.

== Organisational division (2025–2026) ==
In February 2025, the AWP experienced an organisational split involving two groups associated with Akhtar Hussain and Aasim Sajjad Akhtar. According to Awami Awaz, a statement issued by acting general secretary Javed Akhtar announced that the party's federal committee had disassociated itself from general secretary Bakhshal Thalho and deputy general secretary Aasim Sajjad Akhtar, while Thalho disputed the committee's authority and said his group would hold a separate congress.

The group retaining the Awami Workers Party name held its fourth federal congress in Lahore on 27 April 2025, electing Akhtar Hussain as president and Farhat Abbas Khan as general secretary. The Election Commission of Pakistan subsequently published the party's intra-party election notification listing its elected office-bearers.

The other group became associated with the name Awami Workers Party–Marxist (AWP-M), with Aasim Sajjad Akhtar and Bakhshal Thalho among its prominent figures. A 2026 analysis published by Jamhoor linked the division to differing approaches to class politics, national oppression and identity-based struggles. By September 2026, Dawn was reporting on AWP-M activities in Sindh, identifying Thalho as its secretary general and covering the arrest and subsequent bail of activists following a political march in Larkana.

== Activities ==
The party's has been one of the only groups actively defending against demolition and eviction of informal housing residents from state machinery especially the CDA.

The party regularly holds seminars, lectures and workshops detailing the position of the party in the current political environment, across Karachi, Islamabad and Gilgit Baltistan.

== Party Leadership ==
- Abid Hassan Minto
- Fanoos Gujjar (Deceased)
- Yousuf Mustikhan (Deceased)
- Akhtar Hussain
- Javed Akhtar
- Aasim Sajjad Akhtar
- Baba Jan (politician)
- Farhat Abbas
- Prof. Hamza Virk
- Abdullah Safi
- Haider Zaman Akhunzada
- Qazi Ali Nawaz Nizamani
- Rana Azam
- Malik Mohammad Azam
- Prof. Shahzahan
