= Tuwairqi Steel Mills =

Pakistani steel manufacturing company

- Type: Private
- Industry: Steel
- Founded: 2004; 22 years ago in Karachi, Pakistan
- Founder: Hilal Hussain Al-Tuwairqi
- Fate: Acquired by Ciena Group
- Headquarters: Karachi, Pakistan
- Area served: Pakistan
- Key people: Hilal Hussain Al-Tuwairqi (Chairman)
- Products: Direct reduced iron
- Owner: Al-Tuwairqi Holding (Saudi Arabia); POSCO (South Korea)
- Parent: Ciena Group

Tuwairqi Steel Mills Limited (TSML) was a steel manufacturing company based in Karachi, Pakistan, operating an integrated direct reduced iron (DRI) plant at Bin Qasim. Established as a foreign direct investment project of the Saudi Arabian Al-Tuwairqi Holding in joint venture with POSCO of South Korea, the company was acquired by the United States-based Ciena Group in 2022 and subsequently renamed National Steel Complex Limited (NSCL).

== History ==
Tuwairqi Steel Mills was conceived as a foreign direct investment project of the Al-Tuwairqi Holding of Saudi Arabia, chaired by Hilal Hussain Al-Tuwairqi. In May 2004, a memorandum of understanding was signed between the company and the Government of Pakistan under which the government agreed to provide a level playing field for the supply of natural gas as fuel and feedstock. On 15 October 2005, the project was notified as a unit of the Export Processing Zone by the Government of Pakistan.

In 2006, the ground breaking ceremony was held, with an estimated initial cost of around US$300 million. Financing for the project included a US$130 million package syndicated by the Islamic Corporation for the Development of the Private Sector with participation by the OPEC Fund for International Development. In September 2011, POSCO acquired a 15.34% equity interest in TSML.

In January 2013, the plant was inaugurated, but operations were suspended in September 2013 over a dispute regarding the supply of subsidised natural gas. During its brief operational period, the plant produced and sold approximately 60,300 tonnes of DRI in the domestic market while incurring an operational loss of US$18.6 million. The company sought a concessionary tariff of Rs123 per million British thermal units, which was rejected by the Government of Pakistan on the grounds that it would amount to a subsidy of approximately Rs25 billion over five years. In an attempt to resolve the dispute, the company offered to transfer up to 17% of its shares to the government in exchange for a guaranteed gas supply, an offer that was not accepted. By 2014, the plant had been mothballed and around 1,000 workers had been laid off.

In February 2018, Hilal Hussain Al-Tuwairqi and Al-Ittefaq Steel Products Company initiated arbitration proceedings against Pakistan before the Permanent Court of Arbitration in The Hague, invoking the Organisation of Islamic Cooperation investment agreement and alleging that Pakistan had failed to honour sovereign assurances regarding gas supply. In December 2023, the tribunal dismissed all claims against Pakistan and ordered the claimants to pay approximately €210,788 in administrative costs along with £1.55 million, €117,941 and US$62,415 in legal expenses.

In October 2019, a term sheet for the sale of TSML to the U.S.-based Ciena Group was signed, and the transfer of management rights was completed in April 2022. As part of the transaction, Ciena Group settled an upfront US$150 million loan owed to a consortium led by the Islamic Corporation for the Development of the Private Sector. In October 2023, the Economic Coordination Committee of the Cabinet of Pakistan granted in-principle approval to rename Tuwairqi Steel Mills Limited to National Steel Complex Limited. Under its new ownership, the company also began securing iron ore mining sub-leases in Balochistan, near Mashkichah in the Nokundi region, through its subsidiary Alhadeed Pelletisation Company.

== Operations ==
The Tuwairqi Steel Mills complex covered an area of 220 acres at Bin Qasim in Karachi and operated direct reduced iron technology based on the Midrex Process developed by Kobe Steel. Phase I of the DRI plant, with a designed capacity of 1.28 million tonnes per annum, was completed at a cost of approximately US$340 million; subsequent expansion phases, projected to require an additional US$850–900 million, were contingent on the commercial success of the first phase. The complex also included a 38 MW combined-cycle captive power plant consisting of four 6.5 MW gas turbines.

The project had been envisaged as the largest private sector integrated steel-manufacturing complex in Pakistan. Following the 2013 shutdown, a small core team continued maintenance and cold-commissioning activities at the facility to keep the plant in a fit-to-run condition.
