= Baba Jan (politician) =

Left-wing politician from Hunza, Gilgit-Baltistan

Baba Jan Hunzai
- بابا جان
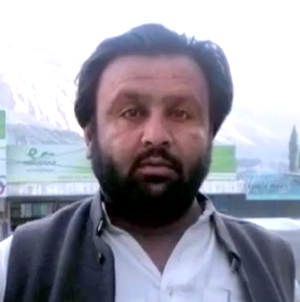
- Baba Jan Hunzai

Member Federal Committee at Awami Workers Party

Personal details
- Born: April 20, 1977 (age 49) Hunza Valley
- Party: Awami Workers Party

Baba Jan (born April 20, 1977) is a left-wing political activist in the Gilgit-Baltistan territory administered by Pakistan. He was sentenced to 71 years in jail by the Gilgit-Baltistani courts on charges of terrorism and of inciting public against the state during the Aliabad incident. Jan was released from jail on November 27, 2020, after the Gilgit-Baltistani government agreed to release all the 14 people due to a week-long Aliabad sit by the families of the incarcerated. He was the former vice-president and now is the president of Awami Workers Party Gilgit Baltistan.

== Incarceration ==
Baba Jan served almost 10 years in jail after being convicted by an anti-terrorism court of participating in a protest against killing of a disaster-affected man and his son by police on August 11, 2011, at Aliabad Hunza. A massive landslide on 4 January 2010 hit Attabad village and blocked Hunza River, forming a 23 km lake which submerged several villages and left over 1,000 people homeless. Baba Jan organized the displaced people to lobby the government for compensation and rehabilitation. While several families were compensated, some 25 families had still not been compensated. On 11 August 2011, some of those families protested by blocking Karakoram Highway (KKH) on which the then Chief Minister of Gilgit-Baltistan Syed Mehdi Shah was due to travel. Police fired teargas and gunshots to disperse the protesters for the Chief Minister's convoy, killing a man and his son. When news of the killings spread through the Hunza Valley, angry protests erupted in many towns in which a number of government buildings and police stations were torched.

Baba Jan was subsequently arrested and tortured, and charged under the Anti-Terrorism Act. In September 2011, an anti-terrorism court sentenced him and eleven other activists to life imprisonment. Human rights organizations have demanded Baba Jan's release, and an international petition for his release has been signed by Noam Chomsky, Tariq Ali, David Graeber, and several others. During his time in prison, it has been reported that Baba Jan has been involved in organizing prisoners and promoting sectarian tolerance between Sunnis and Shias.

== Participation in elections ==
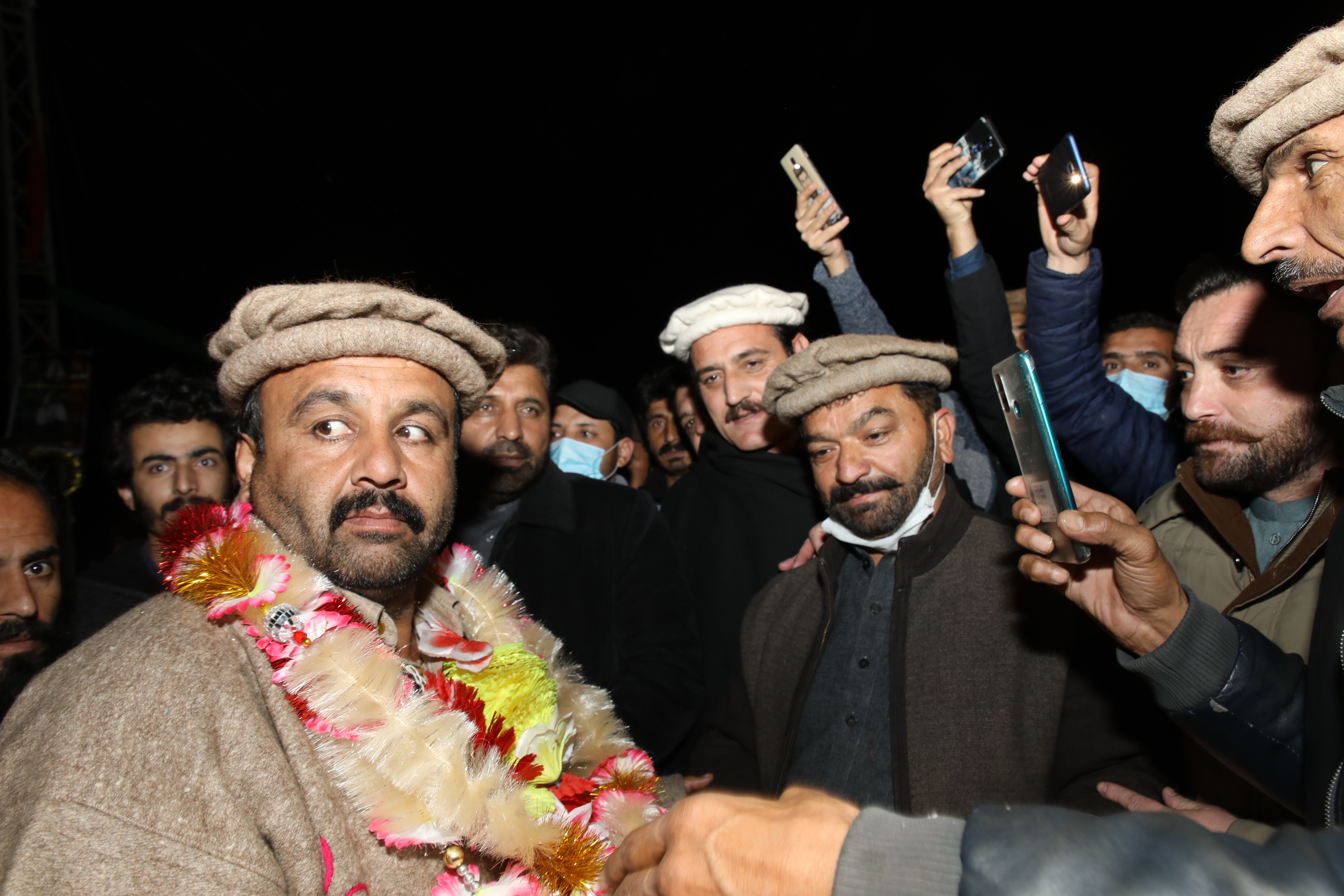
Baba Jan being received by Awami Workers Party activists in Gilgit after his release from jail.

Despite his incarceration, he contested for a seat in the 2015 Gilgit-Baltistan Legislative Assembly elections as the Awami Workers Party's candidate for Constituency GBLA-6. He came in second place, losing out to Mir Ghazanfar Ali Khan of Hunza's ruling family, who was backed by the party of Pakistani prime minister Nawaz Sharif, the Pakistan Muslim League (N). However Baba Jan garnered more votes than the other mainstream parties, including the Pakistan Peoples Party and the Pakistan Tehreek-e-Insaf.

In November 2015, Mir Ghazanfar Ali Khan was appointed by the Pakistani prime minister as the Governor of Gilgit-Baltistan, resulting in a by-election for his vacated seat on 28 May 2016. The Awami Workers Party again nominated Jan as their candidate for the constituency but, on 30 April 2016, the returning officer rejected Jan's nomination papers on the grounds of being a convict serving a jail term. On 4 May 2016, a court accepted an appeal filed against the rejection of his nomination papers and allowed him to run. The supreme appellate court of Gilgit-Baltistan postponed the election for a period of three weeks to complete hearing of two cases pending charged against Jan and ultimately upheld the returning officer's decision, thus forcing Jan out of the 2016 Hunza by-elections.

In the 2020 Gilgit-Baltistan elections, the Awami Workers Party once again nominated Jan as their primary candidate for the GBA-6 Hunza seat. Jan's candidature was rejected and Asif Saeed contested the election on Awami Workers Party ticket, winning 2,629 votes and coming in 5th in the November 15 polls.

== Release from jail after 10 years ==
Jan and the other 13 people incarcerated for the 2011 Aliabad incident were finally released on or before 27 November 2020. Jan, Iftikhar Hussain and Shukoorullah Baig were the last to be released, the eleven others were released in October or November the same year. The release was made possible due to a seven-day sit-in by the families of the prisoners at Aliabad, Hunza. The sit-in started on October 4 at the College Chowk in Aliabad, the families demanded the release of the 14 incarcerated men saying the terrorism charges on them were false and the prisoners were punished for raising their voice for the rights of victims of Atabad disaster. The sit-in continued for seven days, on the seventh day Gilgit-Baltistan's interim government held talks with the families of the incarcerated men and assured them that the prisoners would be released before November 30, 2020.
