= All Parties Democratic Movement =

Pakistani political alliance

The All Parties Democratic Movement (APDM) was a Pakistani political alliance consisting of 32 political parties opposed to the military rule of Pervez Musharraf. Some parties of the alliance boycotted the elections.

== Members ==
Its members included:

- Awami National Party
- Muttahida Majlis-e-Amal
- National Workers Party
- Pakistan Muslim League (N)
- Pashtunkhwa Milli Awami Party
- Pakistan Tehreek-e-Insaf

Most notable was the absence of the Pakistan Peoples Party of late Benazir Bhutto.

The members of APDM resigned all of their legislators in the national assembly and the four regional assemblies when General (ret) Pervez Musharraf's nomination papers for the presidential election were accepted. Ex-Prime Minister Shaukat Aziz from Musharraf's Pakistan Muslim League (Q) stated that their resignations would be irrelevant, as the assemblies would be dissolved prior to the general election due later that year, anyway.

In September 2007, 35 leaders of the parties which were a part of APDM were arrested to prevent agitation against General (ret) Pervez Musharraf. That was the moment when APDM leaders announced their MPs and MPAs would resign on 2 October 2007. In 2011, an APC was held because of the call of Yousaf Raza Gillani on the security of Pakistan. All the political parties of Pakistan were allowed to talk together. All Pakistan Muslim League which is the party of Pervez Musharraf was not allowed to participate in it. Government critics like Sheikh Rasheed Ahmad and Imran Khan had also participated in it. This conference finally passed a resolution which was later by Information Minister Dr. Firdous Aashiq Awan about the security of Pakistan. However, Government of Pakistan did not act on the resolution of APDM and drone attacks are still held on Pakistan.
