= Mir Ghazanfar Ali Khan =

Pakistani politician

Mir میر Ghazanfar Ali Khan
- میر غضنفر علی خان

Mir of Hunza
- Incumbent
- Assumed office 1976

6th Governor of Gilgit-Baltistan
- In office 24 November 2015 – 14 September 2018
- President: Mamnoon Hussain; Arif Alvi
- Prime Minister: Nawaz Sharif; Shahid Khaqan Abbasi; Nasirul Mulk (caretaker); Imran Khan
- Preceded by: Chaudhry Muhammad Barjees Tahir (acting)
- Succeeded by: Raja Jalal Hussain Maqpoon

Personal details
- Born: Ghazanfar Ali Khan; 31 December 1945 (age 80) State of Hunza, British India (now Hunza Valley, Gilgit-Baltistan, Pakistan)
- Children: 3, including Shah Salim Khan (son)
- Education: University of Karachi
- Profession: Politician

Mir Ghazanfar Ali Khan (Urdu: میر غضنفر علی خان, born 31 December 1945) is a Pakistani politician who served as the 6th Governor of Gilgit-Baltistan.

He was appointed as a governor of Gilgit-Baltistan after acting governor Barjees Tahir. On 14 September 2018, he resigned from his post.

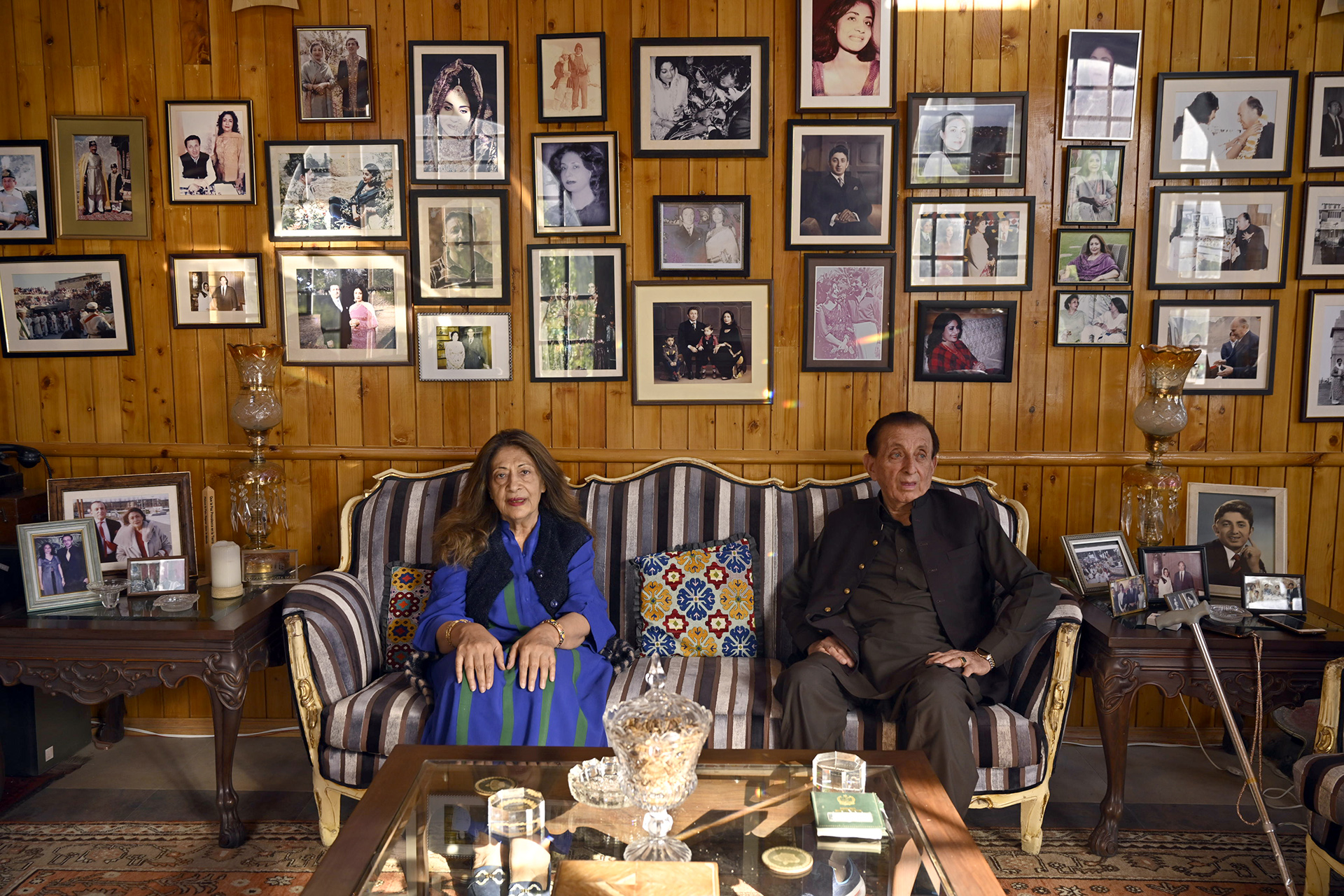
Mir Ghazanfar Ali Khan II and his wife, Rani Atiga, in his residence in Karimabad, Hunza, Pakistan. (2024)

== Family background ==
Mir Ghazanfar belongs to the ruling family of Hunza. He is the son of the last ruling Mir of Hunza, Muhammad Jamal Khan. Mir Mohammad Jamal Khan was the son of Mir Ghazan II. Mohammad Jamal Khan was named Mir on 25 September 1974. When he died in 1976, his son Ghazanfar Ali Khan II became the non-sovereign head of the state in 1976. The State of Hunza was dissolved by Zulfikar Ali Bhutto, Prime Minister of Pakistan on 25 September 1974. Thus, the title of Mir is only titular.

Mir Ghazanfar has 3 sons: Prince Salim Khan, Prince Shehryar Khan and Prince Salman Khan.

== Political career ==
HE contested the 1994 Northern Areas Legislative Council (NALC) elections from NA-6 Hunza, but was unsuccessful. He was defeated by Nazir Sabir.

He was elected to the NALC from NA-6 Hunza as a candidate of Pakistan Muslim League (Q) (PML(Q)) in the 2004 elections. He defeated Wazir Baig, a candidate of Pakistan People's Party (PPP). He was later appointed as the Deputy Chief Executive of the NALC.

He was elected to the Gilgit-Baltistan Assembly from GBA-6 Hunza-Nagar-III as a candidate of Pakistan Muslim League (N) (PML(N)) in the 2015 Gilgit-Baltistan Assembly election. He received 8,242 votes and defeated Baba Jan, a candidate of Awami Workers Party (AWP).

== See also ==
- List of current Pakistani governors
