= National Workers Party (Pakistan) =

National Workers Party نیشنل ورکرز پارٹی
- Abbreviation: NWP
- President: Abid Hassan Minto
- Founded: May 1, 1999
- Dissolved: February 2010
- Merger of: Awami Jamhoori Party; Pakistan Socialist Party; Faction of Pakistan National Party
- Succeeded by: Workers Party Pakistan
- Ideology: Communism
- Political position: Left-wing
- National affiliation: All Parties Democratic Movement

National Workers Party was a Pakistani political party. On 1 May 1999, the Awami Jamhoori Party, Pakistan Socialist Party and a faction of Pakistan National Party formed the National Workers Party (NWP). Abid Hassan Minto was elected its first President and holds the office to date by election.

The NWP was part of the All Parties Democratic Movement (APDM) and the Awami Jamhoori Tehreek (AJT). Together with the Communist Mazdoor Kissan Party (CMKP) led by Sufi Abdul Khaliq, it was one of the two major communist political formations/parties in Pakistan in its time.

In February 2010, the party merged with the Communist Mazdoor Kissan Party, People's Rights Movement (PRM) and other left wing parties to form Workers Party Pakistan which later merged with Awami Party Pakistan and Labour Party Pakistan to form Awami Workers Party.
