= Labour Party Pakistan =

Political party

Labour Party Pakistan لیبر پارٹی پاکستان
- Secretary-General: Nasir Shah
- Spokesperson: Farooq Tariq
- Labour Secretary: Nasir Mansoor
- Women Secretary: Nazli Javeed
- Youth Secretary: Nisar Lagari
- Peasant Secretary: Hakim Bahadur Khan
- Founded: 1986
- Dissolved: 10 November 2012
- Succeeded by: Awami Workers Party
- Headquarters: Directorate-General for Labour Headquarters
- Ideology: Communism; Trotskyism; Secularism
- Political position: Left-wing to far-left
- Colors

Party flag

The Labour Party Pakistan (Urdu: لیبر پارٹی پاکستان, LPP) was a far-left political party and a leading labor union, closely allying associating with Fourth International.

It claimed membership of 7,300 members in 2009. It originates from the Trotskyist tradition. Its founders were students in the Netherlands who came into contact with the Committee for a Workers' International and were recruited to that body in 1980. They returned to Pakistan in 1986 and began carrying out entry work in the Pakistan Peoples Party as The Struggle. From 1991, some members split from The Struggle and operated as an open group; in 1995 they became the Jeddojuhd Inqilabi Tehreek (JIT) or Struggle Revolutionary Movement. This was in opposition to the advice of the CWI. This was with a membership of 70 militants which grew to 740 by 1997 when the LPP was launched. The LPP was expelled from the CWI after accepting funds from NGOs.

The rest of The Struggle continued as a section of the International Marxist Tendency until Lal Khan was expelled in 2016 over differences on entryism inside PPP.

The LPP is close to groupings such as the Scottish Socialist Party and the International Socialist Organisation in the United States. In March 2005, it obtained permanent observer status in the reunified Fourth International.

The party was led by Chairman Nisar Shah (Late). The General Secretary was Farooq Tariq. Supporters of the party publish a weekly paper in Urdu, Mazdoor Jeddojuhd.

In November 2012, the LPP announced that it was to merge with two other left parties, the Awami Party Pakistan and the Workers Party Pakistan, forming a new Awami Workers Party. The new party's aims would include a break with multinational capital and imperialism, the end of feudalism, establishment of a democratic federal system and improving relations with neighbouring states. The LPP dissolved on 10 November 2012, and Farooq Tariq was elected general secretary of the AWP. In 2018, the party merged with the Communist Mazdoor Kissan Party and the National Workers Party to form the Awami Workers Party. In October 2019, the LPP announced its resignation from the AWP. Farooq Tariq alleged that the group was being "witch-hunted" in the party, and said that the party had been reluctant to work with farmers', workers' and democratic movements, or to campaign for the release of political prisoner Baba Jan, a leading AWP member.
