= List of members of the 2nd Jatiya Sangsad =

2nd Jatiya Sangsad
←	1st Sangsad	3rd Sangsad	→
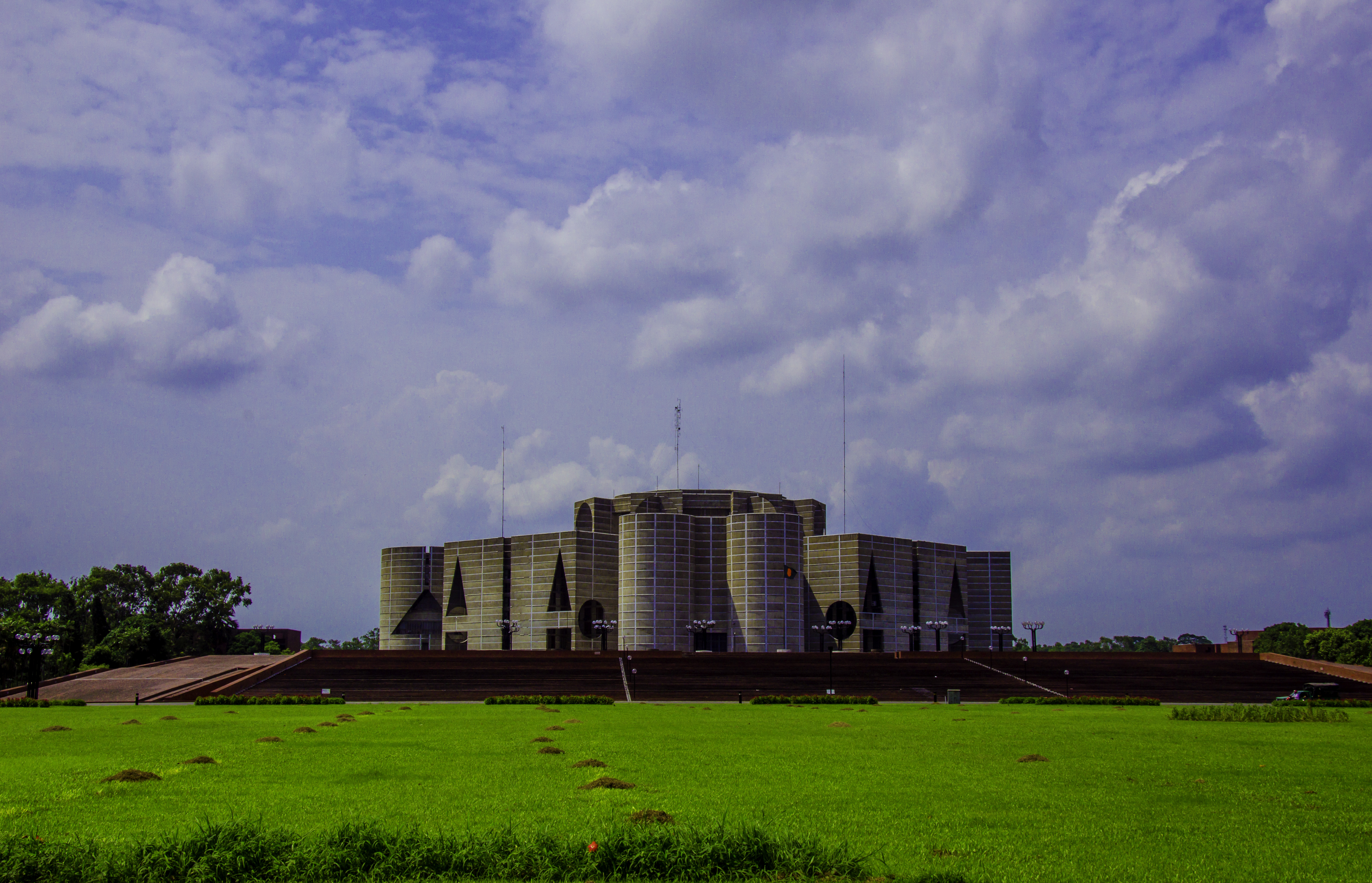

Overview
- Legislative body: Parliament of the Bangladesh
- Jurisdiction: Bangladesh
- Term: 18 February 1979 – 24 March 1982
- Election: 1979 Bangladeshi general election

Jatiya Sangsad
- Members: 300

This is a list of members of Parliament (MPs) elected to the 2nd Parliament of the Jatiya Sangsad, the National Parliament of Bangladesh, by Bangladeshi constituencies. The list includes both MPs elected at the 1979 general election, held on 18 February 1979, and nominated women's members for reserved seats and those subsequently elected in by-elections.

== Members ==
=== Elected members of parliament ===
Party affiliation is as of May 1979. Some members may have been elected as, for example, independents, and then may have joined the Bangladesh Nationalist Party.

No	Constituency	Name	Party	Notes
1	Dinajpur-1	Jamiur Uddin Sarker	Bangladesh Nationalist Party	
2	Dinajpur-2	Sirajul Islam	Awami League	
3	Dinajpur-3	Rezwanul Haque	Bangladesh Nationalist Party	
4	Dinajpur-4	Mirza Ruhul Amin	Bangladesh Nationalist Party	
5	Dinajpur-5	Md. Shawkat Ali	Awami League	
6	Dinajpur-6	Golam Rahman Shah	Awami League	
7	Dinajpur-7	Satish Chandra Roy	Awami League	
8	Dinajpur-8	S. A. Bari	Bangladesh Nationalist Party	
9	Dinajpur-9	Shah Mahatab Ahmad	Awami League	
10	Dinajpur-10	Mansur Ali Sarkar	Bangladesh Nationalist Party	
11	Dinajpur-11	Md. Atiur Rahman	Bangladesh Nationalist Party	
12	Rangpur-1	Mashiur Rahman	Bangladesh Nationalist Party	
12	Rangpur-1	Shawfikul Ghaani Shapan	Bangladesh Nationalist Party	1979 by-election
13	Rangpur-2	Mohammad Amin	Awami League	
14	Rangpur-3	Kazi Abdul Kader	Bangladesh Muslim League	
15	Rangpur-4	Mujibur Rahman	Bangladesh Nationalist Party	
16	Rangpur-5	Kazi Nuruzzaman	Bangladesh Nationalist Party	
17	Rangpur-6	Mojibur Rahman	Bangladesh Nationalist Party	
18	Rangpur-7	Mohammad Moin Uddin Sarkar	Bangladesh Nationalist Party	
19	Rangpur-8	Mohammad Elias	Bangladesh Nationalist Party	
20	Rangpur-9	Rezaul Haque Sarkar	Bangladesh Nationalist Party	
21	Rangpur-10	Rahim Uddin Bharosha	Bangladesh Nationalist Party	
22	Rangpur-11	Khandaker Golam Mostafa	Bangladesh Nationalist Party	
23	Rangpur-12	Mohammad Matiar Rahman Chowdhury	Bangladesh Nationalist Party	
24	Rangpur-13	Shamsul Haque Chowdhury	Awami League	
25	Rangpur-14	Tajul Islam Choudhury	Bangladesh Nationalist Party	
26	Rangpur-15	Md. Riaz Uddin Ahmed	Bangladesh Nationalist Party	
27	Rangpur-16	AKM Maidul Islam	Bangladesh Nationalist Party	
28	Rangpur-17	Mohammad Sirajul Haque	Islamic Democratic League	
29	Rangpur-18	Rezaul Alam Khandaker	Islamic Democratic League	
30	Rangpur-19	R. A. Gani	Bangladesh Nationalist Party	
31	Rangpur-20	Lutfor Rahman	Awami League	
32	Rangpur-21	Mohammad Rustam Ali	Bangladesh Nationalist Party	
33	Rangpur-22	Mohammad Sirajul Islam Mia	Bangladesh Nationalist Party	
34	Rangpur-23	Mokhlesur Rahman Mia	Bangladesh Nationalist Party	
35	Bogra-1	Abdul Alim	Bangladesh Nationalist Party	
36	Bogra-2	Md. Abul Hasnat Chowdhury	Bangladesh Nationalist Party	
37	Bogra-3	Abdul Majid Talukdar	Bangladesh Nationalist Party	
38	Bogra-4	AKM Motiar Rahman	Bangladesh Nationalist Party	
39	Bogra-5	Md. Sirajul Huq Talukder	Bangladesh Nationalist Party	
40	Bogra-6	Wajed Hossain Tarafdar	Bangladesh Nationalist Party	
41	Bogra-7	Habibur Rahman	Bangladesh Nationalist Party	
42	Bogra-8	Azizul Haque	Bangladesh Nationalist Party	
43	Bogra-9	SM Farooq	Bangladesh Nationalist Party	
44	Rajshahi-1	Shahjahan Miah	Bangladesh Nationalist Party	
45	Rajshahi-2	Syed Manzur Hossain	Bangladesh Nationalist Party	
46	Rajshahi-3	Ehsan Ali Khan	Bangladesh Nationalist Party	
47	Rajshahi-4	M. A. Salam Chowdhury	Bangladesh Nationalist Party	
48	Rajshahi-5	Mokhlechhar Rahman Chowdhury	Bangladesh Nationalist Party	
49	Rajshahi-6	Mohammad Maqbool Hossain	Bangladesh Nationalist Party	
50	Rajshahi-7	Emaz Uddin Pramanik	Awami League	
51	Rajshahi-8	AKM Morshed	Bangladesh Nationalist Party	
52	Rajshahi-9	Chowdhury Motahar Hossain	Bangladesh Nationalist Party	
53	Rajshahi-10	Mohammad Mohsin	Awami League	
54	Rajshahi-11	Emran Ali Sarkar	Bangladesh Nationalist Party	
55	Rajshahi-12	AKSKM Afzal Hossain	Bangladesh Nationalist Party	
56	Rajshahi-13	Abdus Sattar Mondal	Bangladesh Nationalist Party	
57	Rajshahi-14	Mohammad Moksed Ali	Bangladesh Nationalist Party	
58	Rajshahi-15	Abdul Mannan	Bangladesh Nationalist Party	
59	Rajshahi-16	Abdus Sattar Khan Chowdhury	Bangladesh Muslim League	
60	Rajshahi-17	Mohammad Mostafizur Rahman	Bangladesh Nationalist Party	
61	Rajshahi-18	Dil Mohammad	Bangladesh Nationalist Party	
62	Pabna-1	Jahurul Islam Talukdar	Bangladesh Nationalist Party	
63	Pabna-2	M. A. Matin	Bangladesh Nationalist Party	
64	Pabna-3	Jamshed Ali	Bangladesh Nationalist Party	
65	Pabna-4	Abdul Latif Mirza	Jatiya Samajtantrik Dal	
66	Pabna-5	M. A. Matin	Bangladesh Muslim League	
67	Pabna-6	AKM Mahbubul Islam	Bangladesh Nationalist Party	
68	Pabna-7	Syed Hossain Mansur	Bangladesh Nationalist Party	
69	Pabna-8	Mirza Abdul Awal	Bangladesh Nationalist Party	
70	Pabna-9	Mirza Abdur Rashid	Bangladesh Nationalist Party	
71	Pabna-10	K. M. Anowarul Islam	Bangladesh Nationalist Party	
72	Pabna-11	Abdul Bari Sarkar	Bangladesh Nationalist Party	
73	Pabna-12	Mirza Abdul Halim	Bangladesh Nationalist Party	
74	Kushtia-1	Ahammad Ali	Bangladesh Nationalist Party	
75	Kushtia-2	Zillur Rahman	Bangladesh Nationalist Party	
76	Kushtia-3	Shah Azizur Rahman	Bangladesh Nationalist Party	
77	Kushtia-4	Md. Abdul Haque	Bangladesh Nationalist Party	
78	Kushtia-5	Mohammad Abdur Rahim	Bangladesh Nationalist Party	
79	Kushtia-6	Syed Masood Rumi	Bangladesh Nationalist Party	
80	Kushtia-7	Miah Mohammed Monsur Ali	Bangladesh Nationalist Party	
81	Kushtia-8	Mohammad Abu Saeed Khan	Bangladesh Nationalist Party	
82	Jessore-1	Md. Golam Mustafa	Jatiya Samajtantrik Dal	
83	Jessore-2	Maulana Nurunnabi Samdani	Islamic Democratic League	
84	Jessore-3	Mohammad Ebadot Hossain Mondal	Bangladesh Nationalist Party	
85	Jessore-4	Mozammel Haque	Islamic Democratic League	
86	Jessore-5	Muhammad Ali Tariq	Bangladesh Nationalist Party	
87	Jessore-6	A. M. Badrul Ala	Bangladesh Nationalist Party	
88	Jessore-7	Gazi Ershad Ali	Bangladesh Nationalist Party	
89	Jessore-8	Afsar Ahmad Siddiqui	Bangladesh Nationalist Party	
90	Jessore-9	Tariqul Islam	Bangladesh Nationalist Party	
91	Jessore-10	M. Nazim Uddin Al Azad	Bangladesh Nationalist Party	
92	Jessore-11	Mohammad Asaduzzaman	Awami League	
93	Jessore-12	Majid-ul-Haq	Bangladesh Nationalist Party	
94	Jessore-13	Abul Basar Sikder	Bangladesh Nationalist Party	
95	Jessore-14	Mollah Maqbool Hossain	Bangladesh Nationalist Party	
96	Khulna-1	Syed Mojahidur Rahman	Bangladesh Nationalist Party	
97	Khulna-2	Abu Saleh Md. Mustafizur Rahman	Bangladesh Nationalist Party	
98	Khulna-3	Aftab Uddin Hawlader	Bangladesh Nationalist Party	
99	Khulna-4	Abdul Latif Khan	Awami League	
100	Khulna-5	Prafulla Kumar Shil	Awami League	
101	Khulna-6	Khan A. Sabur	Bangladesh Muslim League	
102	Khulna-7	Ashraf Hossain	Bangladesh Nationalist Party	
103	Khulna-8	Khan A. Sabur	Bangladesh Muslim League	
103	Khulna-8	AKM Ziauddin	Bangladesh Nationalist Party	
104	Khulna-9	Salahuddin Yusuf	Awami League	
105	Khulna-10	Sheikh Razzak Ali	Bangladesh Nationalist Party	
106	Khulna-11	Aosafur Rahman	Bangladesh Muslim League	
107	Khulna-12	Aftabuzzaman	Bangladesh Nationalist Party	
108	Khulna-13	M. Mansur Ali	Bangladesh Nationalist Party	
109	Khulna-14	Syeda Razia Faiz	Bangladesh Muslim League	
110	Khulna-15	Khalilur Rahman	Bangladesh Muslim League	
111	Patuakhali-1	Akhtaruzzaman Alamgir	Bangladesh Nationalist Party	
112	Patuakhali-2	Siddiqur Rahman	Awami League	
113	Patuakhali-3	Moazzem Hossain	Bangladesh Nationalist Party	
114	Patuakhali-4	Abdul Baten	Bangladesh Nationalist Party	
115	Patuakhali-5	Habibur Rahman Mia	Awami League	
116	Patuakhali-6	A. S. M. Feroz	Awami League	
117	Bakerganj-1	Mosharraf Hossain Shahjahan	Bangladesh Nationalist Party	
118	Bakerganj-2	Nazrul Islam	Awami League	
119	Bakerganj-3	M. M. Nazrul Islam	Awami League	
120	Bakerganj-4	Siddiqur Rahman	Bangladesh Nationalist Party	
121	Bakerganj-5	Sunil Kumar Gupta	Bangladesh Nationalist Party	
122	Bakerganj-6	Sirajul Haque Montu	Bangladesh Nationalist Party	
123	Bakerganj-7	Abdul Jabbar Talukdar	Bangladesh Nationalist Party	
124	Bakerganj-8	Abdul Wadud Sardar	Bangladesh Nationalist Party	
125	Bakerganj-9	Rashed Khan Menon	Ganatantrik Andolan	
126	Bakerganj-10	Abdur Rahman Biswas	Bangladesh Nationalist Party	
127	Bakerganj-11	A.B.M. Ruhul Amin Howlader	Bangladesh Nationalist Party	
128	Bakerganj-12	Shahjahan Omar	Bangladesh Nationalist Party	
129	Bakerganj-13	Abdur Rob	Bangladesh Nationalist Party	
130	Bakerganj-14	Sudhangshu Shekhar Haldar	Awami League	
131	Bakerganj-15	A. K. Faezul Huq	Bangladesh Nationalist Party	
132	Bakerganj-16	Abdur Rahim	Islamic Democratic League	
133	Bakerganj-17	Mohiuddin Ahmed	Awami League	
134	Tangail-1	Syed Hasan Ali Chowdhury	Bangladesh Nationalist Party	
135	Tangail-2	Afazuddin Fakir	Bangladesh Nationalist Party	
136	Tangail-3	Sawkat Ali Bhuiyan	Bangladesh Nationalist Party	
137	Tangail-4	Shajahan Siraj	Jatiya Samajtantrik Dal	
138	Tangail-5	Abdur Rahman	Bangladesh Nationalist Party	
139	Tangail-6	Noor Muhammad Khan	Bangladesh Nationalist Party	
140	Tangail-7	Khaju Mia	Bangladesh Nationalist Party	
141	Tangail-8	Morshed Ali Khan Panni	Bangladesh Nationalist Party	
142	Jamalpur-1	Almas Hossain	Bangladesh Muslim League	
143	Jamalpur-2	Rashed Mosharraf	Awami League	
144	Jamalpur-3	Karimuzzaman Talukder	Bangladesh Nationalist Party	
145	Jamalpur-4	Abdus Salam Talukder	Bangladesh Nationalist Party	
146	Jamalpur-5	Md. Syed A. Sobhan	Bangladesh Nationalist Party	
147	Jamalpur-6	Khondakar Abdul Hamid	Bangladesh Nationalist Party	
148	Jamalpur-7	Abdus Salam	Bangladesh Nationalist Party	
149	Jamalpur-8	Serajul Haque	Bangladesh Nationalist Party	
150	Mymensingh-1	Tafazzal Hossain Khan	Bangladesh Nationalist Party	
151	Mymensingh-2	Ismail Hossain Talukder	Bangladesh Muslim League	
152	Mymensingh-3	AFM Nazmul Huda	Bangladesh Nationalist Party	
153	Mymensingh-4	Zainul Abedin	Bangladesh Nationalist Party	
154	Mymensingh-5	Khurram Khan Chowdhury	Bangladesh Nationalist Party	
155	Mymensingh-6	AKM Fazlul Haque	Bangladesh Nationalist Party	
156	Mymensingh-7	Abul Mansur Ahmed	Bangladesh Nationalist Party	
157	Mymensingh-8	Shamsul Huda Chaudhury	Bangladesh Nationalist Party	
158	Mymensingh-9	Habib Ullah Sarkar	Bangladesh Nationalist Party	
159	Mymensingh-10	Aftab Uddin Chowdhury	Bangladesh Muslim League	
160	Mymensingh-11	Fazlur Rahman Sultan	Bangladesh Nationalist Party	
161	Mymensingh-12	Jalal Uddin Talukder	Bangladesh Nationalist Party	
162	Mymensingh-13	Mosharraf Hossain	Awami League	
163	Mymensingh-14	Abdul Motaleb Khan Pathan	Jatiya Samajtantrik Dal	
164	Mymensingh-15	Ashraf Uddin Khan	Bangladesh Nationalist Party	
165	Mymensingh-16	Abdul Momin	Awami League	
166	Mymensingh-17	Ali Osman Khan	Bangladesh Nationalist Party	
167	Mymensingh-18	Asaduzzaman Khan	Awami League	
168	Mymensingh-19	Anisuzzaman Khokon	Bangladesh Nationalist Party	
169	Mymensingh-20	Abu Ahmad Fazlul Karim	Bangladesh Nationalist Party	
170	Mymensingh-21	M Osman Ghani	Independent	
171	Mymensingh-22	Farhad Ahmed Kanchan	Bangladesh Nationalist Party	
172	Mymensingh-23	Aamir Uddin Ahmod	Bangladesh Nationalist Party	
173	Mymensingh-24	Mojibur Rahman	Bangladesh Nationalist Party	
174	Dhaka-1	Khandaker Delwar Hossain	Bangladesh Nationalist Party	
175	Dhaka-2	Abdul Halim Chowdhury	Bangladesh Nationalist Party	
176	Dhaka-3	Nizam Uddin Khan	Bangladesh Nationalist Party	
177	Dhaka-4	Anwar Uddin Shikdar	Bangladesh Nationalist Party	
178	Dhaka-5	Muhammad Hamidullah Khan	Bangladesh Nationalist Party	
179	Dhaka-6	A. Q. M. Badruddoza Chowdhury	Bangladesh Nationalist Party	
180	Dhaka-7	Siddiquir Rahman	Bangladesh Nationalist Party	
181	Dhaka-8	Md. Abdul Hai	Bangladesh Nationalist Party	
182	Dhaka-9	Nurul Haque	Bangladesh Nationalist Party	
183	Dhaka-10	Atauddin Khan	Bangladesh Nationalist Party	
184	Dhaka-11	Shamsul Haque	Bangladesh Nationalist Party	
185	Dhaka-12	Jahangir Mohammad Adel	Bangladesh Nationalist Party	
186	Dhaka-13	Abul Hasnat	Bangladesh Nationalist Party	
187	Dhaka-14	S. A. Khaleque	Bangladesh Nationalist Party	
188	Dhaka-15	Mirza Ghulam Hafiz	Bangladesh Nationalist Party	
189	Dhaka-16	Abul Kashem	Bangladesh Nationalist Party	
190	Dhaka-17	Abdur Rauf	Bangladesh Nationalist Party	
191	Dhaka-18	Chowdhury Tanbir Ahmed Siddiky	Bangladesh Nationalist Party	
192	Dhaka-19	Mohammad Habibullah	Bangladesh Nationalist Party	
193	Dhaka-20	Dewan Mohammad Idris	Bangladesh Nationalist Party	
194	Dhaka-21	Ataur Rahman Khan	Bangladesh Jatiya League	
195	Dhaka-22	Mohammad Sanaullah	Bangladesh Nationalist Party	
196	Dhaka-23	Mokhlesur Rahman	Bangladesh Nationalist Party	
197	Dhaka-24	Mohammad Shahidullah	Bangladesh Nationalist Party	
198	Dhaka-25	Ahmadul Kabir	Independent	
199	Dhaka-26	Moin Uddin Bhuiyan	Bangladesh Nationalist Party	
200	Dhaka-27	Abdul Momen Khan	Bangladesh Nationalist Party	
201	Dhaka-28	Abdul Matin Chowdhury	Bangladesh Nationalist Party	
202	Dhaka-29	Mohammad Shamsul Haque	Bangladesh Nationalist Party	
203	Dhaka-30	ASM Solomon	Bangladesh Gono Front	
204	Dhaka-31	MA Sattar	Bangladesh Nationalist Party	
205	Dhaka-32	Jalal Uddin	Bangladesh Nationalist Party	
206	Faridpur-1	ABM Golam Mustafa	Bangladesh Nationalist Party	
207	Faridpur-2	Md. Abdul Matin Mia	Jatiya Samajtantrik Dal	
208	Faridpur-3	Sirajul Islam Mridha	Bangladesh Nationalist Party	
209	Faridpur-4	Shah Mohammad Abu Zafar	Awami League	
210	Faridpur-5	Chowdhury Kamal Ibne Yusuf	Bangladesh Nationalist Party	
211	Faridpur-6	KM Obaidur Rahman	Bangladesh Nationalist Party	
212	Faridpur-7	Qazi Abu Yusuf	Awami League	
213	Faridpur-8	Akhter Mia	Bangladesh Nationalist Party	
214	Faridpur-9	Kazi Abdur Rashid	Awami League	
215	Faridpur-10	Mollah Jalaluddin Ahmed	Awami League	died 18 December 1979
215	Faridpur-10	Sheikh Selim	Awami League	by-election
216	Faridpur-11	Phani Bhushan Majumder	Awami League	
217	Faridpur-12	Qazi Mahabub Ahmed	Bangladesh Nationalist Party	
218	Faridpur-13	Altaf Hossain Chowdhury	Bangladesh Nationalist Party	
219	Faridpur-14	Sardar AKM Nasiruddin	Bangladesh Nationalist Party	
220	Faridpur-15	Shawkat Ali	Awami League	
221	Faridpur-16	Abdul Mannan Sikder	Bangladesh Nationalist Party	
222	Faridpur-17	Ibrahim Khalil	Bangladesh Muslim League	
223	Sylhet-1	Syed Rafiqul Haque	Bangladesh Nationalist Party	
224	Sylhet-2	Suranjit Sengupta	Jatiya Ekata Party	
225	Sylhet-3	Dewan Shamsul Abedin	Bangladesh Nationalist Party	
226	Sylhet-4	Iqbal Hossain Chowdhury	Bangladesh Nationalist Party	
227	Sylhet-5	Abul Hasnat Md. Abdul Hai	Independent	
228	Sylhet-6	Md. Enamul Haque Chowdhury	Awami League	
229	Sylhet-7	Dewan Taimur Raja Chowdhury	Bangladesh Nationalist Party	
230	Sylhet-8	Khandaker Abdul Malik	Bangladesh Nationalist Party	
231	Sylhet-9	Nazim Kamran Choudhury	Bangladesh Nationalist Party	
232	Sylhet-10	Mohammad Abdul Haque	Independent	
233	Sylhet-11	Lutfur Rahman	Bangladesh Nationalist Party	
234	Sylhet-12	Muhammad Sirajul Islam	Awami League	
235	Sylhet-13	Abdul Jabbar	Awami League	
236	Sylhet-14	Saifur Rahman	Bangladesh Nationalist Party	
237	Sylhet-15	Mohammad Elias	Awami League	
238	Sylhet-16	Syed Mahibul Hasan	Bangladesh Nationalist Party	
239	Sylhet-17	Syed Mohammad Qaisar	Independent	
240	Sylhet-18	MA Mottalib	Bangladesh Nationalist Party	
241	Sylhet-19	Junab Ali	Bangladesh Nationalist Party	
242	Sylhet-20	Mahbubur Rob Sadi	Jatiya Samajtantrik Dal	
243	Comilla-1	Chhattar Bhuiyan	Bangladesh Nationalist Party	
244	Comilla-2	Md. Faridul Huda	Bangladesh Nationalist Party	
245	Comilla-3	Harun-or-Rashid	Bangladesh Nationalist Party	
246	Comilla-4	Dewan Sirajul Huq	Bangladesh Nationalist Party	
247	Comilla-5	Habib Ullah Khan	Bangladesh Nationalist Party	
248	Comilla-6	Mozammel Haque	Bangladesh Nationalist Party	
249	Comilla-7	Matruza Hossain Mollah	Bangladesh Nationalist Party	
250	Comilla-8	Abdur Rashid	Jatiya Samajtantrik Dal	
251	Comilla-9	A. K. M. Abu Zahed	Bangladesh Nationalist Party	
252	Comilla-10	Redwan Ahmed	Bangladesh Nationalist Party	
253	Comilla-11	Muzaffar Ahmed	NAP (Muzzafar)	
254	Comilla-12	Ali Hossain Mia	Bangladesh Nationalist Party	
255	Comilla-13	Mofizul Islam	Bangladesh Jatiya League	
256	Comilla-14	Akbar Hossain	Bangladesh Nationalist Party	
257	Comilla-15	M Anwar Ullah	Awami League	
258	Comilla-16	Md. Joynal Abedin Bhuiyan	Awami League	
259	Comilla-17	Syed Habibul Haque	Bangladesh Nationalist Party	died in 1979
259	Comilla-17	Omar Ahmed Majumder	Awami League	1979 by-election
260	Comilla-18	Nurur Rahman	Bangladesh Nationalist Party	
261	Comilla-19	Alfaz Uddin	Bangladesh Nationalist Party	
262	Comilla-20	Md. Nurul Huda	Bangladesh Nationalist Party	
263	Comilla-21	AB Siddique	Awami League (Mizan)	
264	Comilla-22	Mizanur Rahman Chowdhury	Awami League (Mizan)	
265	Comilla-23	M. A. Matin	Bangladesh Nationalist Party	
266	Comilla-24	Abdul Mannan	Bangladesh Nationalist Party	
267	Noakhali-1	Zafar Imam	Bangladesh Nationalist Party	
268	Noakhali-2	Rafiquzzaman Bhuiyan	Bangladesh Nationalist Party	
269	Noakhali-3	A B M Taleb Ali	Awami League	
270	Noakhali-4	K. M. Hossain	Bangladesh Nationalist Party	
271	Noakhali-5	Moudud Ahmed	Bangladesh Nationalist Party	
272	Noakhali-6	Borhan Uddin	Bangladesh Nationalist Party	
273	Noakhali-7	Ahmad Nazir	Bangladesh Nationalist Party	
274	Noakhali-8	Mustaq Ahmed	Bangladesh Nationalist Party	
275	Noakhali-9	Mohammad Momin Ullah	Bangladesh Nationalist Party	
276	Noakhali-10	Mohammad Abul Kalam	Bangladesh Nationalist Party	
277	Noakhali-11	Mohammad Ismail	Bangladesh Nationalist Party	
278	Noakhali-12	Shafiq Ullah	Islamic Democratic League	
279	Noakhali-13	Mohammad Toaha	Communist Party of Bangladesh (Marxist–Leninist)	
280	Noakhali-14	Amirul Islam Kalam	Bangladesh Nationalist Party	
281	Chittagong-1	Obaidul Huq Khandaker	Bangladesh Nationalist Party	
282	Chittagong-2	L. K. Siddiqi	Bangladesh Nationalist Party	
283	Chittagong-3	AKM Rafiq Ullah Choudhury	Bangladesh Gano Front	
284	Chittagong-4	Jamal Uddin Ahmad	Bangladesh Nationalist Party	
285	Chittagong-5	Anisul Islam Mahmud	Bangladesh Nationalist Party	
286	Chittagong-6	A. M. Zahiruddin Khan	Bangladesh Nationalist Party	
287	Chittagong-7	Salahuddin Quader Chowdhury	Bangladesh Muslim League	
288	Chittagong-8	Sultan Ahmed Chowdhury	Bangladesh Nationalist Party	
289	Chittagong-9	Arif Moinuddin	Bangladesh Nationalist Party	
290	Chittagong-10	Sirajul Islam	Bangladesh Nationalist Party	
291	Chittagong-11	Nazrul Islam	Bangladesh Nationalist Party	
292	Chittagong-12	Shahadat Hossain Chowdhury	Bangladesh Nationalist Party	
293	Chittagong-13	Mahbub Kabir Chowdhury	Bangladesh Nationalist Party	
293	Chittagong-13	Oli Ahmad	Bangladesh Nationalist Party	1980 by-election
294	Chittagong-14	Mostaq Ahmed Chowdhury	Bangladesh Nationalist Party	
295	Chittagong-15	Mahmudul Islam Chowdhury	Bangladesh Nationalist Party	
296	Chittagong-16	Mahmudul Karim Chowdhury	Bangladesh Nationalist Party	
297	Chittagong-17	Harun Aur Rashid Khan	Bangladesh Nationalist Party	
298	Chittagong-18	Shahjahan Chowdhury	Bangladesh Nationalist Party	
299	Hill Chittagong-1	Upendra Lal Chakma	Jatiya Samajtantrik Dal	
300	Hill Chittagong-2	Aung Shwe Prue Chowdhury	Bangladesh Nationalist Party	

=== Members of the Reserved Women's Seat ===
Sl. No.	Parliamentarian	Seat No.	Party
01	Hasina Rahman	Seat-01	Bangladesh Nationalist Party
02	Taslima Abed	Seat-02	Bangladesh Nationalist Party
03	Daulatunnesa Khatun	Seat-03	Bangladesh Nationalist Party
04	Ayesha Ashraf	Seat-04	Bangladesh Nationalist Party
05	Raushan Elahi	Seat-05	Bangladesh Nationalist Party
06	Rahmatun Nesa	Seat-06	Bangladesh Nationalist Party
07	Kamrun Nahar	Seat-07	Bangladesh Nationalist Party
08	Rafika Khanam	Seat-08	Bangladesh Nationalist Party
09	Ayesha Sardar	Seat-09	Bangladesh Nationalist Party
10	Snigdha Haque	Seat-10	Bangladesh Nationalist Party
11	Sultana Zaman Chowdhury	Seat-11	Bangladesh Nationalist Party
12	Fazilatun Nessa Begum	Seat-12	Bangladesh Nationalist Party
13	Syeda Sakina Islam	Seat-13	Bangladesh Nationalist Party
14	Ferdousi Begum	Seat-14	Bangladesh Nationalist Party
15	Mahmuda Khatun	Seat-15	Bangladesh Nationalist Party
16	Rahima Khandaker	Seat-16	Bangladesh Nationalist Party
17	Hosne Ara Khan	Seat-17	Bangladesh Nationalist Party
18	Raushan Azad	Seat-18	Bangladesh Nationalist Party
19	Amina Rahman	Seat-29	Bangladesh Nationalist Party
20	Shahina Khan	Seat-20	Bangladesh Nationalist Party
21	Gulbadan Begum	Seat-21	Bangladesh Nationalist Party
22	Begum Shamsun Nahar	Seat-22	Bangladesh Nationalist Party
23	Farida Rahman	Seat-23	Bangladesh Nationalist Party
24	Fatema Chowdhury Paru	Seat-24	Bangladesh Nationalist Party
25	Khaleda Rabbani	Seat-25	Bangladesh Nationalist Party
26	Rabeya Chowdhury	Seat-26	Bangladesh Nationalist Party
27	Mabud Fatema Kabir	Seat-27	Bangladesh Nationalist Party
28	Khadija Sufian	Seat-28	Bangladesh Nationalist Party
29	Begum Kamrun Nahar Jafar	Seat-29	Bangladesh Nationalist Party
30	Saleha Khanam	Seat-30	Bangladesh Nationalist Party
