= Ziaur Rahman ministry =

8th Council of Ministers of Bangladesh

- 2nd Council of Advisers and 8th Council of Ministers of the People's Republic of Bangladesh
- 29 June 1978 – 20 November 1981
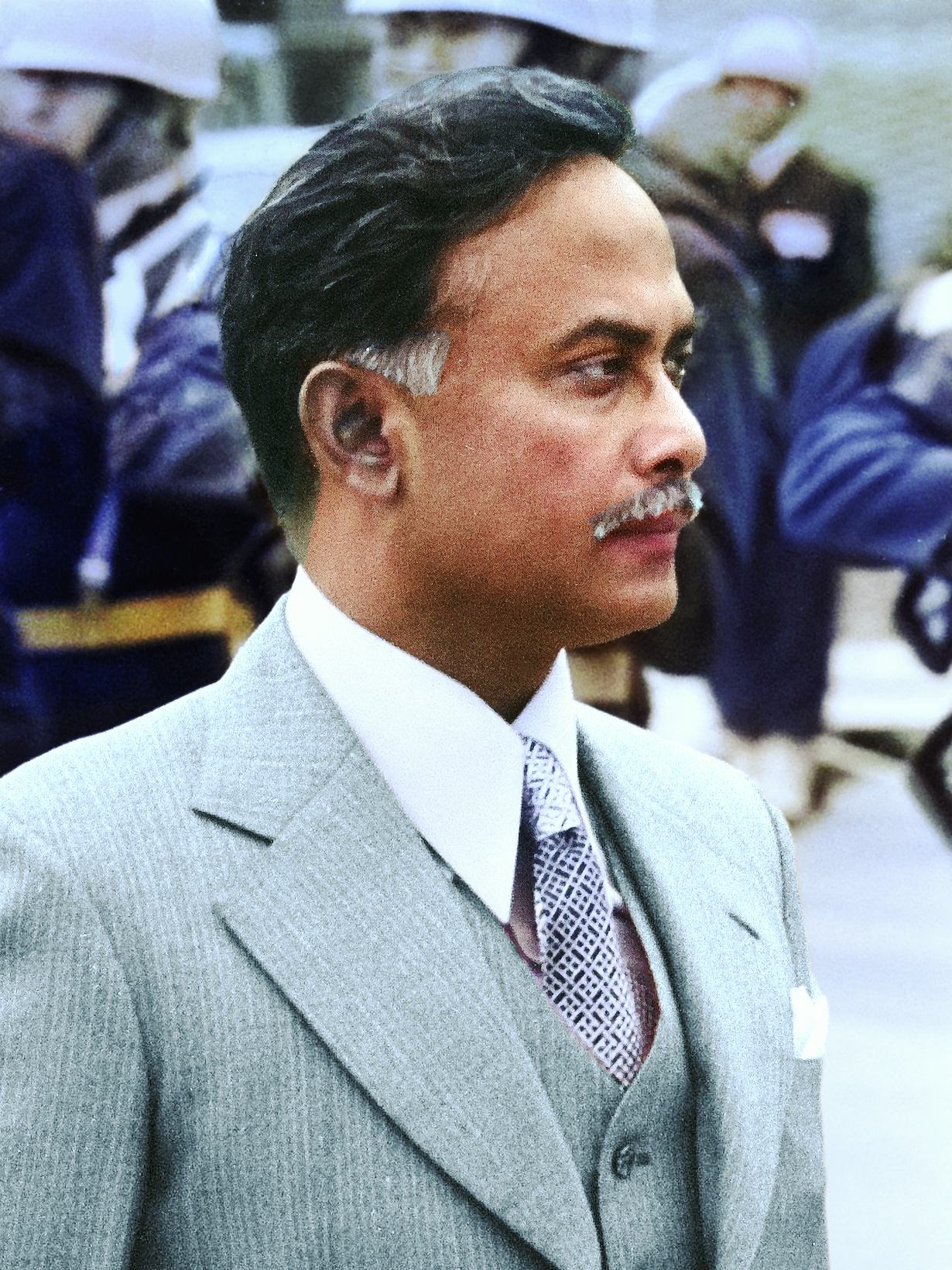
- President Ziaur Rahman
- Date formed: 29 June 1978
- Date dissolved: 27 November 1981

People and organisations
- President: Ziaur Rahman; Abdus Sattar (acting)
- President's history: Ziaur Rahman; Former Chief of Staff of Bangladesh Army; (1975–78); Former Chief Martial Law Administrator(1976–79); Former President of Bangladesh (acting) (1977–78); Abdus Sattar; Former Interior Minister of Pakistan (1956); Former Special Assistant to the President of Bangladesh; (1975–77); Vice-President of Bangladesh (since 1977)
- Vice-President: Abdus Sattar
- Member party: Bangladesh Nationalist Party
- Status in legislature: Single-party majority
- Opposition party: Bangladesh Awami League
- Opposition leader: Asaduzzaman Khan

History
- Elections: 1978 (presidential); 1979 (general)
- Outgoing election: 1981 (presidential)
- Legislature terms: 2nd Jatiya Sangsad
- Predecessor: Sayem
- Successor: Sattar

The Ziaur Rahman ministry was the second democratically elected Council of Ministers of Bangladesh, during the 2nd legislative session of the Jatiya Sangsad. It was initially formed with members of a provisional council of ministers on 29 June 1978, and with members elected to the reconvened parliament the following year on 15 April, a few days after the martial law promulgated since the August 1975 coup was finally withdrawn following a general election in February 1979. The ministry served under the directly elected President Ziaur Rahman and, after his assassination, his acting president Abdus Sattar. It was dissolved by Sattar after he won the snap 1981 presidential election in November and declared a new council of ministers.

== Members ==
The following lists the president(s), the vice-president(s) and the special assistant(s) to the president:

Portfolio	Minister	Took office	Left office
President, CMLA (until 1979) and also in-charge of꞉: Presidential Secretariat (Presidential Division, General and Economic Affairs, Information Division); Cabinet Secretariat (Cabinet Division); Ministry of Defence; Ministry of Science and Technology	Ziaur Rahman	12 June 1978	30 May 1981 (assassinated)
President, CMLA (until 1979) and also in-charge of꞉: Presidential Secretariat (Presidential Division, General and Economic Affairs, Information Division); Cabinet Secretariat (Cabinet Division); Ministry of Defence; Ministry of Science and Technology	Abdus Sattar (acting)	30 May 1981	20 November 1981
Vice-president and also in-charge of Ministry of Law and Parliamentary Affairs	Abdus Sattar	29 June 1978	20 November 1981
Assistant to the President	Benita Roy	9 November 1978	30 July 1979

=== Cabinet ministers ===
==== Provisional council ====
Portfolio	Minister	Took office	Left office
Senior Minister (acting Prime Minister); Minister of Railways, Roads, Bridges and Road Transport	Mashiur Rahman	29 June 1978	12 March 1979 (died in office)
Minister of Planning; Minister of Commerce	Mirza Nurul Huda	29 June 1978	15 April 1979
Minister of Labour and Social Welfare	Shah Azizur Rahman	29 June 1978	15 April 1979

==== Elected council ====
Image	Name	Status	Term start	Term end
	Shah Azizur Rahman	Prime Minister	15 April 1979	27 November 1981
	Jamal Uddin Ahmad	Deputy Prime Minister of Bangladesh	15 April 1979	27 November 1981
	S. A. Bari	Deputy Prime Minister of Bangladesh	23 August 1979	27 November 1981
	Muhammad Shamsul Huq	Minister of Foreign Affairs	29 June 1978	27 November 1981
	Abdul Momen Khan	Minister of Food	29 June 1978	27 November 1981
	M Majidul Huq	Minister of Establishment		
	Abdul Halim Chowdhury	Minister of Local Government, Rural Development and Cooperative		
	Abu Saleh Mohammad Mustafizur Rahman	Minister of Home Affairs	6 July 1978	27 November 1981
	Ziaur Rahman	Minister of Finance	29 June 1978	14 April 1979
	Mirza Nurul Huda	Minister of Finance	15 April 1979	24 April 1980
	Saifur Rahman	Minister of Finance	25 April 1980	27 November 1981
	BM Abbas	Minister of Water Resources	29 June 1978	14 April 1979
	Moudud Ahmed	Minister of Water Resources	15 April 1979	2 January 1980
	Kazi Anwarul Haque	Minister of Water Resources	2 January 1980	27 November 1981
	Habib Ullah Khan	Minister of Information and Broadcasting	4 July 1978	25 April 1980
	Shamsul Huda Chaudhury	Minister of Information and Broadcasting	25 April 1980	27 November 1981
	Nurul Huq	Minister of Ports Shipping and IWT	4 July 1978	27 November 1981
	AKM Azizul Haque	Minister of Agriculture	29 June 1978	13 April 1979
	Nurul Islam Shishu	Minister of Agriculture	15 April 1979	20 June 1981
	Amirul Islam Kalam	Minister of Agriculture	13 July 1981	27 November 1981
	Kazi Anwarul Haque	Minister of Civil Aviation and Tourism	4 July 1978	14 July 1979
	Mohammed Abdul Matin	Minister of Civil Aviation and Tourism	15 July 1979	22 August 1979
	Kazi Anwarul Haque	Minister of Civil Aviation and Tourism	23 August 1979	24 April 1980
	KM Obaidur Rahman	Minister of Civil Aviation and Tourism	25 April 1980	26 November 1981
	Mashiur Rahman	Ministry of Road Transport and Bridges	4 July 1978	13 March 1979
	SM Shafiul Azam	Ministry of Road Transport and Bridges	15 March 1979	15 April 1979
	Abdul Alim	Ministry of Road Transport and Bridges	15 April 1979	27 November 1981
	Habib Ullah Khan	Minister of Jute	30 May 1981	27 November 1981
	Abdur Rahman Biswas	Minister of Religious Affairs		
	BM Abbas	Minister for Petroleum and Mineral Resources	4 July 1978	15 April 1979
	A.Z.M. Enayetullah Khan	Minister for Petroleum and Mineral Resources	4 July 1978	19 October 1978
	Akbar Hossain	Minister for Petroleum and Mineral Resources	19 October 1978	15 April 1979
	Nurul Huq	Minister for Petroleum and Mineral Resources	7 April 1979	15 April 1979
	Moudud Ahmed	Minister for Petroleum and Mineral Resources	15 April 1979	2 January 1980
	Kazi Anwarul Haque	Minister for Petroleum and Mineral Resources	2 January 1980	27 November 1981
	Mirza Nurul Huda	Minister of Planning	29 June 1978	15 April 1979
	Fashiuddin Mahtab	Minister of Planning	15 April 1979	27 November 1981
	M. A. Matin	Minister of Youth Development		
	Rasaraj Mandal	Minister of relief and Rehabilitation	4 July 1978	6 April 1979
	Emran Ali Sarkar	Minister of relief and Rehabilitation	6 April 1979	6 August 1979
	Moudud Ahmed	Minister of Posts, Telecommunications and Information Technology	4 July 1978	15 April 1979
	AKM Maidul Islam	Minister of Posts, Telecommunications and Information Technology	15 April 1979	27 November 1981
	Md. Reazuddin Ahmed	Minister of Labour and Labour Welfare	27 August 1979	27 November 1981
	Muhammad Yusuf Ali	Minister of Textiles		
	Mohammed Abdul Matin	Minister of Health and Family Welfare	13 April 1978	6 April 1981
	Kazi Zafar Ahmed	Minister of Education	4 July 1978	11 October 1978
	Shah Azizur Rahman	Minister of Education	15 April 1979	27 November 1981
	Abdur Rahman	Minister of Housing and Public Works	4 July 1978	25 April 1980
	Saifur Rahman	Minister of Commerce	29 June 1978	30 April 1980
	Jamal Uddin Ahmad	Minister of Industries	29 June 1978	27 November 1981

=== State ministers ===
==== Elected council ====
Image	Name	Position	Took office	Left office
	Abdul Baten	State Minister of Education	11 October 1978	15 April 1979
	Abu Ahmad Fazlul Karim	State Minister of Health and Family Welfare	15 April 1979	25 April 1980
	Abu Ahmad Fazlul Karim	State Minister of Health and Family Welfare	6 April 1981	13 July 1981
	R. A. Ghani	State Minister of Science and Technology		
	Sunil Kumar Gupta	State Minister of Petroleum and Mineral Resources	15 April 1979	25 April 1980
	Iqbal Mahmud	State Minister of Agriculture and Forestry	1979	1981
	Dr. Abul Quasem	State Minister for Youth Development	1979	23 November 1981
	Aung Shwe Prue Chowdhury	State Minister of Food		
	Taslima Abed	State Minister of Women Affairs	24 November 1981	27 November 1981
	Mohammad Ismail	State Minister of Land Administration and Land Reforms		
	Chowdhury Tanbir Ahmed Siddiky	State Minister of Commerce	1 May 1980	31 May 1980
	L. K. Siddiqi	State Minister of Power, Water Resources & Flood Control	25 April 1980	27 November 1981
	Aftabuzzaman	State Minister of Fisheries and Livestock		
	Sirajul Haque Montu	State Minister of Textiles		
	Amirul Islam Kamal	State Minister of Culture and Sports		
	Muhammad Jamiruddin Sircar	State Minister of Public Works and Urban Development	6 April 1981	27 November 1981
	Abdus Salam Talukder	State Minister of Law and Parliamentary Affairs	24 November 1979	27 November 1981
	Syed Mahibul Hasan	State Minister of Human Resources Development and Social Welfare	24 November 1981	27 November 1981

=== Deputy ministers ===
Portfolio	Minister	Took office	Left office
Assistant Adviser to the President on Tribal Affairs	Subimal Dewan	19 September 1980	27 November 1981

==== Elected council ====
Image	Name	Position	Took office	Left office
	Begum Kamrun Nahar Jafar	Deputy Minister of Local Government, Rural Development and Cooperative		
	Professor Abdus Salam	Deputy Minister of Home Affairs	24 November 1979	27 November 1981
	Zafar Imam	Deputy Minister of Relief and Rehabilitation	25 April 1980	27 November 1981
	Iqbal Hossain Chowdhury	Deputy Minister of Food		
	Mabud Fatema Kabir	Deputy Minister of Health and Population Control	15 April 1979	30 May 1981

=== Advisers ===
Portfolio	Minister	Took office	Left office
Adviser for Civil Aviation and Tourism	Kazi Anwarul Haque	6 April 1979	15 April 1979
Deputy adviser for Agriculture and Forest	Fashiuddin Mahtab	6 April 1979	15 April 1979
Adviser for Jute	S. M. Shafiul Azam	15 April 1979	27 November 1981
Adviser for Finance	Mirza Nurul Huda	24 April 1980	24 November 1981
