= Sattar ministry =

Eighth Cabinet of Bangladesh

- 8th Council of Ministers of the People’s Republic of Bangladesh

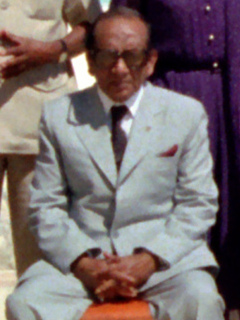
- President Sattar in 1981
- Date formed: 24 November 1981
- Date dissolved: 24 March 1982

People and organisations
- President: Abdus Sattar

History
- Predecessor: Ziaur Rahman ministry
- Successor: Ershad ministry

When President Ziaur Rahman was assassinated on 30 May 1981, Abdus Sattar assumed the duties of the acting President of Bangladesh. Later, he was elected president and formed two cabinets. The first on 24 November 1981 and the second on 12 February 1982. The cabinet was in effect until 24 March 1982.

== President ==
| Serial | Name | Office | Term |
|---|---|---|---|
| 02 | Abdus Sattar | President | 24 November 1981 – 24 March 1982 |
| 02 | Mirza Nurul Huda | Vice President. Ministry of Industry and Commerce | 24 November 1981 – 24 March 1982 |
| 03 | Mohammad Mohammadullah | Vice President | 12 February 1982– 24 March 1982 |

== Prime Minister ==
| Serial | Name | Office | Term |
|---|---|---|---|
| 01 | Shah Azizur Rahman | Prime Minister, Ministry of Education | 27 November 1981 – 24 March 1982 |
| 02 | Jamal Uddin Ahmad | Deputy Prime Minister | 12 February 1982-24 March 1982 |

== Minister ==
| Sequential | Name | Office | Term |
|---|---|---|---|
| 1 | Jamal Uddin Ahmad | Minister of Industries | 24 November 1981 – 12 February 1982 |
| 2 | Muhammad Shamsul Huq | Minister of Foreign Affairs | 24 November 1981 – 24 March 1982 |
| 3 | Kazi Anwarul Haque | Minister of Energy | |
| 4 | Abdul Momen Khan | Minister of Food | 24 November 1981 – 11 February 1982 |
| 5 | Majid-ul-Haq | Minister of Ports, Shipping and Inland Water Transport | 27 November 1981 – 11 February 1982 |
| 6 | Abdul Haleem Chowdhury | Minister of Local Government, Rural Development and Cooperatives (LGRD) | 24 November 1981 – 12 February 1982 |
| 6 | Abdul Haleem Chowdhury | Minister of Food and Relief | 12 February 1982 – 24 March 1982 |
| 7 | Abu Saleh Mohammad Mustafizur Rahman | Minister of Commerce | 1 December 1981 – 11 February 1982 |
| 8 | Saifur Rahman (Bangladeshi politician) | Minister of Finance | 24 November 1981 – 11 January 1982 |
| 9 | Shamsul Huda Chaudhury | Minister of Information and Broadcasting | 24 November 1981 – 12 February 1982 |
| 9 | Shamsul Huda Chaudhury | Minister of Radio, Sports and Culture | 12 February 1982 – 24 March 1982 |
| 10 | Fasihuddin Mahtab | Minister of Agriculture and Forests | 24 November 1981 – 12 February 1982 |
| 10 | Fasihuddin Mahtab | Minister of Finance | 12 February 1982 – 24 March 1982 |
| 11 | Mohammed Abdul Matin | Minister of Civil Aviation and Tourism | 24 November 1981 – 12 February 1982 |
| 11 | Mohammed Abdul Matin | Minister of Home Affairs and LGED | 12 February 1982 – 24 March 1982 |
| 12 | Emran Ali Sarkar | Minister of Relief and Rehabilitation | 24 November 1981 – 11 February 1982 |
| 13 | Abdul Alim | Minister of Railways, Roads, Highways and Road Transport | 24 November 1981 – 11 February 1982 |
| 14 | Abdur Rahman | Minister of Health and Population Control | 24 November 1981 – 12 February 1982 |
| 15 | Khondakar Abdul Hamid | Minister of Health and Population Control | |
| 16 | AKM Maidul Islam | Minister of Aviation, Posts, Telegraphs and Telephones | 24 November 1981 – 12 February 1982 |
| 16 | AKM Maidul Islam | Minister of Fuel, Aviation and Tourism | 12 February 1982 – 24 March 1982 |
| 17 | Riaz Uddin Ahmed Bhola Mia | Minister of Labour and Industrial Welfare | 24 November 1981 – 12 February 1982 |
| 17 | Riaz Uddin Ahmed Bhola Mia | Minister of Agriculture, Labour and Social Welfare | 12 February 1982 – 24 March 1982 |
| 18 | Muhammad Yusuf Ali | Minister of Jute and Textiles | 24 November 1981 – 12 February 1982 |
| 18 | Muhammad Yusuf Ali | Minister of Industries | 12 February 1982 – 24 March 1982 |
| 19 | Abdur Rahman Biswas | Minister of Religion | |
| 20 | L. K. Siddiqi | Minister of Power, Water, Irrigation and Flood Control | |
| 21 | Tafazzal Hossain Khan | Minister of Law and Parliament | 24 November 1981 – 12 February 1982 |
| 21 | Tafazzal Hossain Khan | Minister of Education, Land Administration and Reforms | 12 February 1982 – 24 March 1982 |
| 22 | Abul Hasnat | Minister of Public Works and Urban Development | |
| 23 | Abul Kashem | Minister of Youth Development | |
| 24 | Sultan Ahmed | Minister of Posts, Telegraphs and Telephones | 12 February 1982 – 24 March 1982 |
| 25 | Abu Ahmad Fazlul Karim | Minister of State for Radio, Sports and Culture | 24 November 1981 – 12 February 1982 |

== State Minister ==
| Serial | Name | Office | Term |
|---|---|---|---|
| 01 | Abdus Salam Talukder | Minister of State for Law and Justice | 27 November 1981 – 24 March 1982 |
| 02 | Syed Mahibul Hasan | Minister of State for Manpower Development and Social Welfare | 24 November 1981 – 24 March 1982 |
| 03 | Aftabuzzaman | Minister of State for Health and Population Control | 24 November 1981 – 24 March 1982 |
| 04 | Amirul Islam Kalam | Minister of State for Fisheries and Animal Husbandry | 24 November 1981 – 12 February 1982 |
| 04 | Amirul Islam Kalam | Minister of State for Relief and Rehabilitation | 12 February 1982 – 24 March 1982 |
| 05 | Taslima Abed | Minister of State for Women's Affairs | 24 November 1981 – 24 March 1982 |
| 06 | Zafar Imam | Minister of State for Relief and Rehabilitation | 24 November 1981 – 24 March 1982 |
| 07 | Abdul Mannan | Minister of State for Education | 24 November 1981–Unknown |
| 07 | Abdul Baten | Minister of State for Education | Unknown – 24 March 1982 |
| 08 | Chowdhury Kamal Ibne Yusuf | Minister of State for LGED | 24 November 1981 – 24 March 1982 |
| 09 | Iqbal Hossain Chowdhury | Minister of State for Food | |
| 10 | Sunil Kumar Gupta | Minister of State for Petroleum and Mineral Resources | |
| 11 | Noor Muhammad Khan | Minister of State for Information and Broadcasting | |
| 12 | Muhammad Jamiruddin Sircar | Minister of State for Foreign Affairs | |
| 13 | Aung Shwe Prue Chowdhury | Minister of State for Posts, Telegraphs, Telephones, Aviation and Tourism | 24 November 1981 – 12 February 1982 |
| 13 | Aung Shwe Prue Chowdhury | Minister of State for Health, Labour and Social Welfare | 12 February 1982 – 24 March 1982 |
| 14 | Abdul Mannan Sikder | Minister of State for Land Administration and Reforms | |
| 15 | A. K. Faezul Huq | Minister of State for Labour and Workers' Welfare | 24 November 1981 – 12 February 1982 |
| 15 | A. K. Faezul Huq | Minister of State for Public Works and Urban Development | 12 February 1982 – 24 March 1982 |
| 16 | Tariqul Islam | Minister of State (Unknown Department) | |
| 17 | Oli Ahmad | Minister of State for Youth Development | 12 February 1982 – 24 March 1982 |
| 18 | Begum Kamrun Nahar Jafar | Minister of State for Women's Affairs | 12 February 1982 – 24 March 1982 |
| 19 | Syed Monjur Hossain Machi | Minister of State for Industries and Commerce | 12 February 1982 – 24 March 1982 |
| 20 | Syeda Razia Faiz | Minister of State for Women and Social Welfare | 12 February 1982 – 24 March 1982 |
| 21 | Shafiqul Ghani Swapan | Unknown | 12 February 1982 – 24 March 1982 |
| 22 | Mahbubur Rahman | Unknown | 12 February 1982 – 24 March 1982 |
| 23 | Syed Mohammad Qaisar | Unknown | 12 February 1982 – 24 March 1982 |
| 24 | Md. Ali Tariq | Unknown | 12 February 1982 – 24 March 1982 |

== Deputy Minister ==
| Serial | Name | Office | Term |
|---|---|---|---|
| 01 | Abdus Salam | Deputy Minister of Home Affairs | 27 November 1981 – 24 March 1982 |
| 02 | A.B.M. Ruhul Amin Howlader | Deputy Minister of Jute and Textiles | 27 November 1981 – 24 March 1982 |
| 03 | Begum Kamrun Nahar Jafar | Deputy Minister of Labour and Manpower | 24 November 1981 – 12 February 1982 |
| 04 | Syed Monjur Hossain | Deputy Minister of Irrigation, Floods and Water Development | 24 November 1981 – 12 February 1982 |
