= Raushan =

Raushan, from Persian روشن (rōšan) 'light, bright,' is an Asian unisex given name that may refer to:

== Males ==
- Raushan Yazdani (1918-1967), Bengali poet and researcher
- Raushan Ali (1921-1994), Bangladeshi politician, advocate and freedom fighter
- Rawshan Yazdani Bhuiyan (died 1981), Bangladeshi freedom fighter
- Raushan Koishibayeva (born 1966), Kazakhstani Paralympic powerlifter
- Raushan Raj (born 1984), Indian cricketer
- Rowshan Ali Miah, Bangladeshi politician

== Females ==
- Rowshan Ershad (born 1943), 3rd First Lady of Bangladesh
- Raushan Elahi, Bangladeshi politician
- Raushan Azad, Bangladeshi politician
- Raoshan Jahan Sathi, Bangladeshi politician

== See also ==
- Rushon District in east Tajikistan
