= Nurul Islam Shishu =

Bangladeshi politician

2nd General Secretary of Bangladesh Nationalist Party
- In office 1981–1985
- Chairman: Abdus Sattar; Khaleda Zia
- Preceded by: A. Q. M. Badruddoza Chowdhury
- Succeeded by: Mustafizur Rahman

Minister of Agriculture
- In office 15 April 1979 – 20 June 1981
- Preceded by: AKM Azizul Haque
- Succeeded by: Amirul Islam Kalam
- Prime Minister: Mashiur Rahman

Military service
- Allegiance: Bangladesh; Pakistan (before 1971)
- Branch: Bangladesh Army; Pakistan Army
- Service years: 1962–1986
- Rank: Major general
- Unit: Corps of Signals
- Commands: Principal Staff Officer at Supreme Command Headquarters; Director of Bangladesh National Cadet Corps; Commander of 86th Independent Signals Brigade; Station Commander, Comilla
- Conflict: Bangladesh Liberation War

Nurul Islam Shishu is a retired major general of the Bangladesh Army, a veteran of the Bangladesh Liberation War, and a former Bangladesh Nationalist Party politician. He served as the minister of agriculture under President Ziaur Rahman. He was considered to be President Ziaur Rahman's most trusted companion.

== Military career ==
=== Pakistan Army ===
Shishu enlisted in the Pakistan Military Academy in 1959 and was commissioned in the Pakistan Army Corps of Signals in 1962. Shishu served in the 8th Signals Battalion in Mangla Cantonment as a staff officer and then in the 32nd Signals Battalion in Peshawar Cantonment during the India–Pakistan war of 1965 as adjutant. Shishu was promoted to major in January 1971 and joined the Inter-Services Intelligence. He was sent to East Pakistan on 20 February for infiltration against the All-Pakistan Awami League party to support Lieutenant General Tikka Khan's upcoming operation. After having a gritty experience in Comilla, Shishu deliberately went rogue by disclosing his affiliation with the Pakistan Armed Forces.

=== Bangladesh Army ===
He joined the Mukti Bahini and fought in the Bangladesh Liberation War as deputy quartermaster of Z Force. After the war, Shishu was promoted to lieutenant colonel and served as the defence attaché at the Bangladesh Embassy to Myanmar. Shishu later upgraded to colonel and served as station commander of Cumilla Cantonment. Shishu is one of the pioneer commanders of the 86th Independent Signals Brigade and, furthermore, the Bangladesh National Cadet Corps.

In 1976, Shishu was promoted to brigadier general and served as the principal staff officer of the Supreme Command Headquarters under the Ziaur Rahman ministry. He was promoted to major general in 1979 and retained his position at Supreme Headquarters till 2 June 1981, after which he served as an ambassador under the Ministry of Foreign Affairs. Shishu went on leave per retirement in November 1986.

== Political career ==
=== Forming Bangladesh Nationalist Party ===
Shishu was made the acting convenor of the Jatiyatabadi Ganatantrik Dal, a political front that was the predecessor to the BNP. As Ziaur Rahman was the CMLA, he could not actively keep in contact with politicians to help form a party. Shishu kept communications with all the politicians on behalf of Ziaur Rahman. Shishu helped President Ziaur Rahman form the Bangladesh Nationalist Party and oversaw the recruitment of politicians into the party.

Shishu served as the minister of agriculture in the cabinet of President Ziaur Rahman. Most of the members of the Zia cabinet were vetted by Shishu on behalf of Zia. After the assassination of Ziaur Rahman, BNP was at the brink of factionalization. The largest faction of the BNP wanted Shishu to take over as chairman of the party. Shishu put his support behind Justice Abdus Sattar instead and made him the chairman. Shishu played a vital role in inducting Khaleda Zia into the BNP. He later served as the acting general secretary of the Bangladesh Nationalist Party while Khaleda Zia was the chairperson of the party. He was dismissed from the post of minister by Hussain Mohammad Ershad.

He retired from the Bangladesh Army when he was 40, with the rank of major general. Shishu retired from politics and moved to Oklahoma, United States, in 1991.
