= Farida Rahman (politician) =

Bangladeshi lawyer and politician

Advocate Farida Rahman
- ফরিদা রহমান

2nd National Parliament Member of Parliament for reserved women-23 seats
- In office 2 April 1979 – 24 March 1982

National Parliament Member of Parliament for reserved women-10 seats
- In office 5 April 1991 – 24 November 1995
- In office 19 March 1996 – 30 March 1996

Personal details
- Party: Bangladesh Nationalist Party

Farida Rahman is a Bangladeshi lawyer and politician. She has served as a member of parliament for three terms from the Bangladesh Nationalist Party's reserved women's seat. She is a member of the BNP's standing committee.

== Political and career ==
Farida Rahman was a nominated member of parliament for the Bangladesh Nationalist Party from the reserved women's seat in the second, fifth and sixth National Parliaments. She was the 'vice-chairperson' of the Bangladesh Nationalist Party.

Farida is a leading women's rights lawyer. In the fifth session of the Nationalist Party, she tried to introduce a bill to ban polygamy for men; however, her party and opposition MPs opposed it as a violation of Sharia law. She had been trying in parliament for two to three years to ban polygamy for men and ensure equal rights for women to inherit with men. In 1995, she was obstructed by an organization of conservative Muslim leaders for criticizing Muslim inheritance laws. The organization demanded that the government punish Farida Rahman for blasphemy.
