= Rizwana Hasan =

Bangladeshi attorney and environmentalist

Syeda Rizwana Hasan
- সৈয়দা রিজওয়ানা হাসান
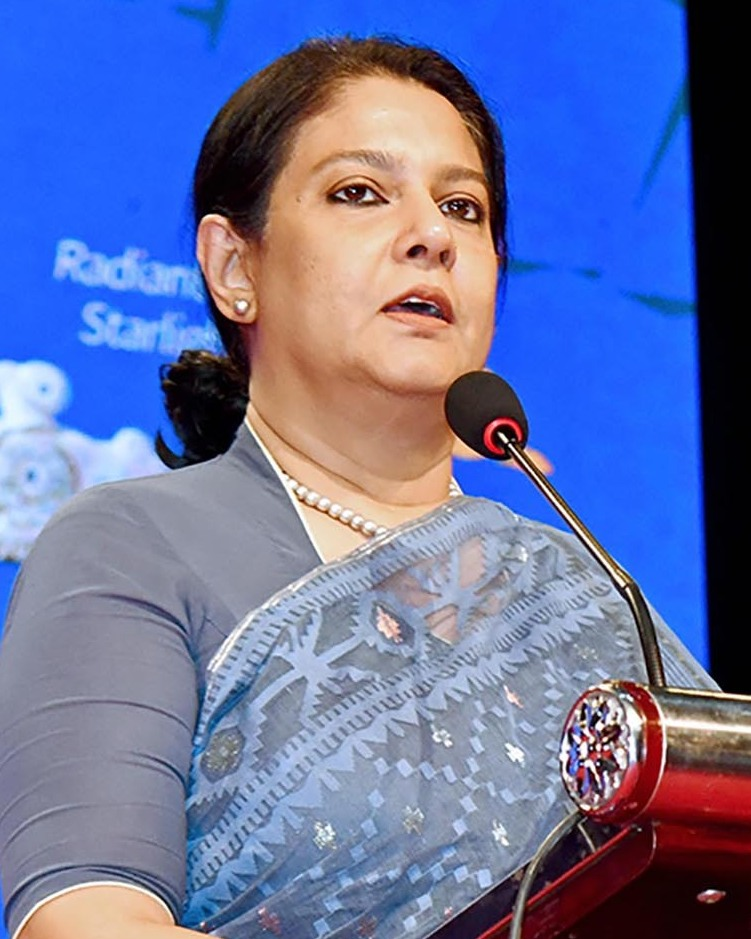
- Rizwana Hasan in 2025

Adviser for Environment, Forest and Climate Change
- In office 9 August 2024 – 17 February 2026
- President: Mohammed Shahabuddin
- Chief Adviser: Muhammad Yunus
- Preceded by: Saber Hossain Chowdhury
- Succeeded by: Abdul Awal Mintoo

Adviser for Water Resources
- In office 16 August 2024 – 17 February 2026
- President: Mohammed Shahabuddin
- Chief Adviser: Muhammad Yunus
- Preceded by: Zaheed Farooque
- Succeeded by: Shahid Uddin Chowdhury Anee

Adviser for Information and Broadcasting
- In office 11 December 2025 – 17 February 2026
- President: Mohammed Shahabuddin
- Chief Adviser: Muhammad Yunus
- Preceded by: Mahfuj Alam
- Succeeded by: Zahir Uddin Swapan

Personal details
- Born: 15 January 1968 (age 58) Habiganj, East Pakistan, Pakistan
- Spouse: AB Siddique
- Children: 3
- Parent: Syed Mahibul Hasan (father)
- Education: University of Dhaka
- Profession: Lawyer
- Known for: Contributions in shipbreaking industry Chief Executive of the BELA
- Awards: Goldman Environmental Prize (2009); Ramon Magsaysay Award (2012); International Women of Courage Award (2022)

Syeda Rizwana Hasan (born 15 January 1968) is a Bangladeshi lawyer and environmentalist. She was an adviser to the interim government of Bangladesh and as adviser of Environment, Forest and Climate Change, Water Resources and Information and Broadcasting. As an environmentalist, her work is focused on regulations for the shipbreaking industry in Bangladesh, and was awarded the Goldman Environmental Prize in 2009. She was also awarded the Ramon Magsaysay Award in 2012 for her "uncompromising courage and impassioned leadership in a campaign of judicial activism in Bangladesh that affirms the people's right to a good environment as nothing less than their right to dignity and life."

== Early life and education ==
Syeda Rizwana Hasan was born on 15 January 1968, into a Bengali Muslim Zamindar family called Narapati Haveli in Habiganj District, East Pakistan. She studied in Viqarunnisa Noon School and College for her secondary education and Holy Cross College for her higher secondary education, before attending the University of Dhaka for her bachelor's and master's degree in law.

== Career ==
Hasan got involved in the shipbreaking industry, first suing the breaking yards in Chittagong in 2003 for, among other reasons, bringing health hazards to the workers, poor working conditions, and improper waste disposal. In response, in March 2003 the court declared shipbreaking without an environmental clearance from the appropriate department illegal. Hasan continues to strive for more labour rights and a safer working environment in the industry. She has also successfully sued organizations involved in filling lakes to build real estate, the improper use of polythene, hill cutting, deforestation, shrimp farming, and building illegal establishments on St. Martin's Island.

== Controversies ==
On 6 March 2026, leaders and activists of Bangladesh Jamaat-e-Islami held a rally in Dhaka demanding an investigation into alleged irregularities in the 12 February parliamentary elections. Speaking near Baitul Mukarram National Mosque, party leaders accused Foreign Minister Khalilur Rahman and former adviser Syeda Rizwana Hasan of involvement in “election engineering”. The protest followed remarks by Rizwana Hasan suggesting that groups opposed to women’s rights should not become mainstream political forces, which Jamaat leaders interpreted as an implied admission that certain parties were deliberately kept out of power.

== Awards ==
Under Hasan's leadership, BELA won the Global 500 Roll of Honor in 2003 by the United Nations Environment Program. She herself won:

- The Inaugural Environment Award in 2007, by the Ministry of Forestry and Environment, Government of Bangladesh, for raising environmental awareness.
- Celebrating Womenhood Award in 2008 by the Nepal-based Creative Statements and South Asia Partnership
- The Goldman Environmental Prize in 2009.
- The Ramon Magsaysay Award in 2012

She has also been dubbed as a Hero of Environment by the American news magazine TIME.

In 2022, Hasan received the International Women of Courage Award from the United States Department of State.

== Personal life ==
Hasan was born in Habiganj to the parents Syed Mahibul Hasan and Suraiya Hasan. She married her classmate lawyer-entrepreneur Abu Bakar Siddique, and has a daughter, Nehla Siddique and two sons, Ahmed Zarir Siddique and Ahmed Zeedan Siddique. In April 2014, her husband Siddique, managing director of a garment factory owned by Nasrul Hamid Bipu, was briefly abducted by unknown individuals.

== Selected works ==
- Laws & decision on compensation in Bangladesh, 2001
- Judicial decisions on environment in South Asia : up to 2000, 2005
- Judicial decisions on environment in South Asia, 2001-2004, 2006
- Supreme Court on wetland conservation, 2014
