= Gulbadan Begum (politician) =

Bangladeshi politician

- গুলবদন বেগম

Member of the Bangladesh Parliament for Reserved Women's Seat–21
- In office 2 April 1979 – 24 March 1982
- Preceded by: Position created

Personal details
- Political party: Bangladesh Nationalist Party

Gulbadan Begum is a Bangladesh Nationalist Party politician and a former member of the Bangladesh Parliament for a women's reserved seat.

== Career ==
Begum was elected to a women's reserved seat in parliament as a Bangladesh Nationalist Party candidate in 1979.
