= Qazi Imdadul Haq =

Bengali writer (1882–1926)

- Born: 1882; Godaipur, Khulna District, Bengal Presidency, British India (now in Bangladesh)
- Died: 1926 (aged 43–44); Calcutta, British India (now in India)
- Citizenship: British Indian
- Education: Presidency College of Calcutta
- Occupation: Writer
- Children: Kazi Anwarul Haque
- Writing career
- Language: Bengali
- Notable work: Abdullah (1932)
- Notable awards: Khan Sahib; Khan Bahadur

Qazi Imdadul Haq (1882–1926) was a Bengali writer.

== Teaching ==
Haq joined the Calcutta Madrasa (now Aliah University) as a temporary teacher in 1904. In 1906, he worked briefly in the Education Department in Shillong, Assam. The next year he joined the Dhaka Madrasa as a teacher. In 1911, he became a professor of geography at the Dhaka Teachers' Training College, in 1914, Assistant School Inspector of Muslim Education for the Dhaka Division, and headmaster of the Calcutta Training School in 1917. In 1921, he became superintendent of the newly founded Dhaka Education Board and continued there until his death.

In recognition of his services, the British Government awarded him the titles Khan Sahib in 1919 and Khan Bahadur in 1926.

== Journalism ==
Haq was involved with M. Hedayetullah, Syed Emdad Ali and M. Asad Ali to publish the monthly Nabanur (1903–06) and was president of the publication committee of the Bangiya Mussalman Sahitya Patrika, a Bengali literary quarterly established on 4 September 1911 in Calcutta.

In May 1920, Haq became an editor of Shiksak, an educational monthly magazine and remained with this magazine for three years. He was also a writer and earned considerable fame for his poems, novels, essays, and children's literature.

== Literary works ==
- Abdullah
- Alexandriar Prachin Pustakagar (The Ancient Library of Alexandria)
- Abdur Rahmaner Kirti (The great deeds of Abdur Rahman)
- France-e Muslim Odhikar (Muslim Conquest of France)
- Alhamra
- Pagal Kholifa (The Crazy Caliph)
- Muslim Jagater Biggan Charcha (Science in the Muslim World)
- Nabi Kahani (Tales of Prophets)

== Personal life ==
Haq was the father of Kazi Anwarul Haque, a bureaucrat, technocrat adviser-minister and writer of Bangladesh.

Haq died on 20 March 1926 in Kolkata.
