= Rafika Khanam =

Bangladeshi politician

Member of Bangladesh Parliament
- In office 18 February 1979 – 12 February 1982

Personal details
- Political party: Bangladesh Nationalist Party

Rafika Khanam (Bengali: রফিকা খানম) is a Bangladesh Nationalist Party politician and a former member of the Bangladesh Parliament in a seat reserved for women.

== Career ==
Khanam was elected to parliament from a women's reserved seat as a Bangladesh Nationalist Party candidate in 1979.
