= Shahina Khan =

Bangladeshi politician

- শাহিনা খান

Member of the Bangladesh Parliament for Reserved Women's Seat–20
- In office 2 April 1979 – 24 March 1982
- Preceded by: Position created

Personal details
- Political party: Bangladesh Nationalist Party

Shahina Khan is a Bangladesh Nationalist Party politician and the former Member of Bangladesh Parliament of women's reserved seat.

== Career ==
Khan was elected to parliament from women's reserved seat as a Bangladesh Nationalist Party candidate in 1979.
