= Fazilatun Nessa Begum =

Bangladeshi politician

Fazillatun Nessa Begum

Member of Bangladesh Parliament
- In office 18 February 1979 – 12 February 1982

Personal details
- Party: Bangladesh Nationalist Party

Fazillatun Nessa Begum (Bengali: ফজিলাতুন নেছা বেগম) is a Bangladesh Nationalist Party politician and a former member of the Bangladesh Parliament of women's reserved seat.

== Career ==
Begum was elected to parliament from women's reserved seat as a Bangladesh Nationalist Party candidate in 1979.
