= Amina Rahman =

Bangladeshi politician

- আমিনা রহমান

Member of the Bangladesh Parliament for Reserved Women's Seat–19
- In office 2 April 1979 – 24 March 1982
- Preceded by: Position created

Personal details
- Political party: Bangladesh Nationalist Party

Amina Rahman is a Bangladesh Nationalist Party politician and a former member of the Jatiya Sangsad of women's reserved seat.

== Career ==
Rahman was elected to parliament from women's reserved seat as a Bangladesh Nationalist Party candidate in 1979.
