= Khadija Sufian =

Bangladeshi politician

- খাদিজা সুফিয়ান

Member of the Bangladesh Parliament for Reserved Women's Seat–28
- In office 2 April 1979 – 24 March 1982
- Preceded by: Position created

Personal details
- Political party: Jatiya Party

Khadija Sufian is a Jatiya Party politician and a former member of the Bangladesh Parliament of women's reserved seat.

== Career ==
Sufian was elected to parliament from women's reserved seat as a Bangladesh Nationalist Party candidate in 1979 and as Jatiya Party candidate in 1986.
