= Nazma Shamima Laiju =

Bangladeshi politician

Member of Bangladesh Parliament
- In office 7 March 1973 – 6 November 1976

Personal details
- Political party: Awami League

Nazma Shamima Laiju (Bengali: নাজমা শামীমা লাইজু) is a Awami League politician in Bangladesh and a former member of the Bangladesh Parliament for a women's reserved seat.

== Career ==
Laiju was elected to parliament from a women's reserved seat as an Awami League candidate in 1973.
