= Habib Ullah Khan (politician) =

Bangladeshi politician

- হাবিব উল্লাহ খান
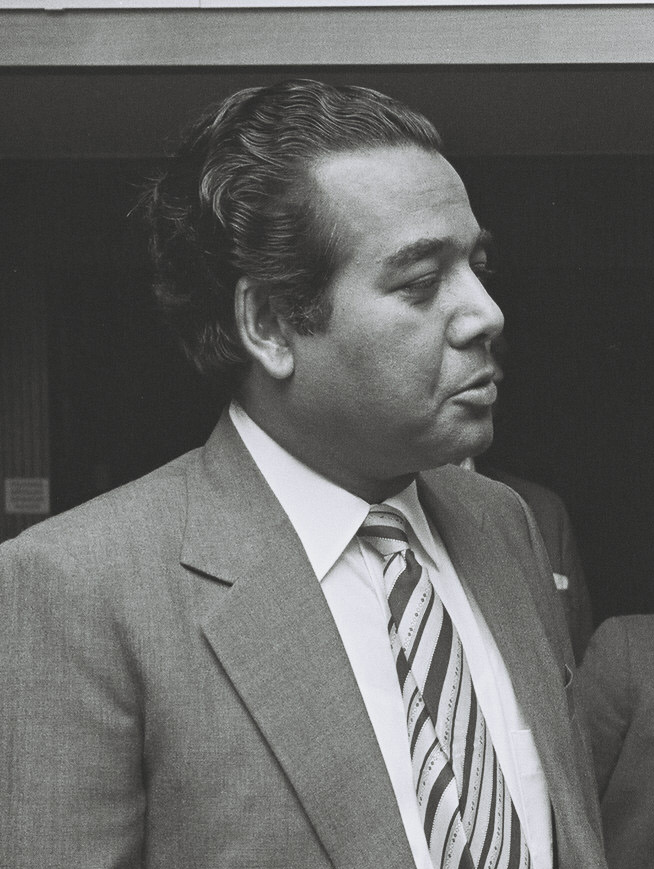
- Khan as the Bangladeshi Minister of Jute at the European Union in Brussels (1980)

Minister of Textiles and Jute
- In office 30 May 1981 – 24 March 1982
- President: Abdus Sattar
- Prime Minister: Shah Azizur Rahman

Member of the Bangladesh Parliament for Comilla-5 (now Brahmanbaria-5)
- In office 18 February 1979 – 24 March 1982

Minister of Information and Broadcasting
- In office 21 April 1977 – 29 May 1981
- President: Ziaur Rahman; Abdus Sattar (acting)
- Prime Minister: Shah Azizur Rahman

1st Ambassador of Bangladesh to South Africa

Personal details
- Born: 31 January 1935 Nabinagar, Greater Comilla, Bengal Presidency, British India
- Died: 7 January 2023 (aged 87) Dhaka, Bangladesh
- Spouse: Salma Khan (d. 2022)
- Children: Humana Khan (daughter)
- Parent: Abdus Shakur Khan (father)

Habib Ullah Khan (31 January 1935 – 7 January 2023) was a Bangladeshi politician and diplomat. He served as the Minister of Information and then as the Minister of Jute under the Bangladesh Nationalist Party (BNP) governments in the late 1970s to early 1980s. He was also a former Member of the Jatiya Sangsad representing Comilla-5 (now Brahmanbaria-5).

== Personal life ==
Khan was born on 31 January 1935 in Nabinagar, Bengal Presidency. His father was Abdus Shakur Khan.

Khan was married to Salma Khan, who was a diplomat and served as an ambassador of Bangladesh to Indonesia. She died in July 2022. They were survived by their only daughter, Humana Khan.

== Career ==
As a politician, Khan joined the Bangladesh Nationalist Party (BNP) and contested in the 18 February 1979 general election from Comilla-5 (now Brahmanbaria-5) and was elected as an MP for the 2nd parliament. The parliament's first session sat on 2 April 1979. During his time as MP, he first served as the Minister of Information and Broadcasting under Ziaur Rahman and after the assassination of Rahman, he served as the Minister of Textiles and Jute under Abdus Sattar's new cabinet. He continued his post until the 1982 coup d'état.

In his diplomatic career, Khan served as the first ambassador of Bangladesh to South Africa as Bangladesh established ties with the country after the election of Nelson Mandela and the end of apartheid.

Khan was also associated with some social and human development organizations. He was one of the founders of 'Assistance for Blind Children (ABC)', which is a Bangladeshi NGO for blind children. He was a former district governor of Rotary International in Bangladesh.

== Death ==
Khan died at Evercare Hospital in Dhaka on 7 January 2023.
