= Abdur Rob (Barisal politician) =

Bangladeshi politician

Member of Bangladesh Parliament
- In office 18 February 1979 – 12 February 1982

Personal details
- Born: February 1909; Timirkati, Nalchity thana, British India
- Political party: Bangladesh Nationalist Party

Abdur Rob (Bengali: আবদুর রব) was a Bangladesh Nationalist Party politician and a member of parliament for Bakerganj-13.

== Biography ==
Abdur Rob was born in February 1909 in Timirkati village of what is now Nalchity Upazila, Jhalokati District, Bangladesh.

Rob was elected to parliament from Bakerganj-13 as a Bangladesh Nationalist Party candidate in 1979.
