= Raushan Azad =

Bangladeshi politician

- রওশন আজাদ

Member of the Bangladesh Parliament for Reserved Women's Seat–18
- In office 2 April 1979 – 24 March 1982
- Preceded by: Position created

Personal details
- Political party: Bangladesh Nationalist Party

Raushan Azad is a Bangladesh Nationalist Party politician and the former Member of the Bangladesh Parliament of women's reserved seat.

== Career ==
Azad was elected to parliament from women's reserved seat as a Bangladesh Nationalist Party candidate in 1979.
