= Mohammad Shamsul Haque (Dhaka politician) =

Bangladeshi (Dhaka) politician

Member of Bangladesh Parliament
- In office 18 February 1979 – 12 February 1982

Personal details
- Born: 15 April 1929 Panchani, Araihazar thana, British India
- Party: Bangladesh Nationalist Party

Mohammad Shamsul Haque (Bengali: শামসুল হক) is a Bangladesh Nationalist Party politician and a former member of parliament for Dhaka-29.

== Biography ==
Mohammad Shamsul Haque was born on 15 April 1929 in Panchani village of what is now Araihazar Upazila, Narayanganj District, Bangladesh.

Haque was elected to parliament from Dhaka-29 as a Bangladesh Nationalist Party candidate in 1979.
