= Aosafur Rahman =

Bangladeshi politician

Member of Bangladesh Parliament
- In office 1979–1986

Personal details
- Born: 1 February 1930 (age 96) Nakka, Assasuni thana, British India
- Party: Bangladesh Nationalist Party

Aosafur Rahman (Bengali: আওশাফুর রহমান) is a Bangladesh Nationalist Party politician and a former member of parliament for Khulna-11.

== Biography ==
Aosafur Rahman was born on 1 February 1930 in Nakka village of what is now Assasuni Upazila, Satkhira District, Bangladesh.

Rahman was elected to parliament from Khulna-11 as a Bangladesh Nationalist Party candidate in 1979.
