= AKM Azizul Haque =

Bangladeshi social worker, development worker and government official

- এ কে এম আজিজুল হক

Minister of Agriculture
- In office 18 June 1976 – 13 April 1979
- Preceded by: Abdus Samad Azad
- Succeeded by: Nurul Islam Shishu

Personal details
- Born: 1 February 1923 Burichang, Comilla, British India
- Died: 3 September 2002 (aged 79) Dhaka, Bangladesh
- Education: Harvard University

AKM Azizul Haque (1 February 1923 – 3 September 2002) was a Bangladeshi social worker, development worker and government official. He was an advisor to the Ministry of Agriculture.

== Early life ==
AKM Azizul Haque was born on 1 February 1923 in Chandla village of Burichang Upazila of Comilla district. He studied in Chandla village primary school and passed secondary from Comilla Zilla School. After graduating from Chittagong College, he passed MA from University of Dhaka in 1944. He received his MPA degree from Harvard University in 1970.

== Career ==
AKM Azizul Haque started his career in 1944 as a lecturer in the English department of Dhaka Intermediate College. He left the teaching profession and joined the Civil Supplies Department, where he first served as Controller, ADC and Director. After the partition of India in 1947, he served as the Private Secretary to the Minister of Education and Information in the then Government of Pakistan. He became the deputy director of the Department of Supplies in 1949. In 1957 he was appointed director of the Cottage Industries Corporation. In 1958, he was appointed managing director of the then East Pakistan Small Industries Corporation. He was the Chairman of East Pakistan Small and Cottage Industries Corporation in 1962. In 1965 he was appointed director of the East Pakistan Industrial Development Corporation. He was the director of Palli Unnayan Academy from 1968 to 1973.

He served as Minister of Agriculture from 18 June 1976 to 13 April 1979.

== Death ==
AKM Azizul Haque died on 3 September 2002.
