= BM Abbas =

Bangladeshi politician

- বি এম আব্বাস

Member of Ziaur Rahman Cabinet
- In office 4 July 1978 – 15 April 1989

Personal details
- Born: December 1911
- Died: 1997

BM Abbas (1911–1997) was a Bangladeshi water resources expert. He was an advisor on flood control, irrigation and power in the cabinets of Sheikh Mujibur Rahman, Khondaker Mostaq Ahmad and Ziaur Rahman. He was the Minister for Flood Control, Irrigation and Power in Ziaur Rahman Cabinet.

== Biography ==
BM Abbas was born in December 1911 at Malda in what is now West Bengal. His father, Muhammad Taimuri, was an inspector of schools. Abbas graduated from Bengal Engineering College in Shibpur, in 1934.

Abbas began his government career in British India as an assistant engineer. He rose through the ranks to superintending engineer the year India was partitioned. In 1955, he became chief engineer, flood control in East Pakistan.

After Bangladesh gained its independence in 1971, he was an advisor on flood control, irrigation and power in the cabinets of Sheikh Mujibur Rahman, Khandaker Mushtaq and Ziaur Rahman. He was the Minister for Flood Control, Irrigation and Power under Ziaur Rahman. He was also the Deputy Prime Minister under President Hussain Muhammad Ershad.

BM Abbas died in 1997.
