= Khaleda Rabbani =

Bangladeshi politician

- খালেদা রব্বানী

Member of the Bangladesh Parliament for Reserved Women's Seat–10
- In office 3 September 2005 – 27 October 2006

Member of the Bangladesh Parliament for Reserved Women's Seat–25
- In office 2 April 1979 – 24 March 1982
- Preceded by: Position created

Personal details
- Party: Bangladesh Nationalist Party

Khaleda Rabbani is a Bangladesh Nationalist Party politician and a former member of the Bangladesh Parliament from a reserved seat.

== Career ==
Rabbani was elected to parliament from a reserved seat as a Bangladesh Nationalist Party candidate in 2005.
