= Mabud Fatema Kabir =

Bangladeshi politician

- মাবুদ ফাতেমা কবীর

Member of the Bangladesh Parliament for Reserved Women's Seat–27
- In office 2 April 1979 – 24 March 1982
- Preceded by: Position created

Personal details
- Political party: Bangladesh Nationalist Party

Mabud Fatema Kabir is a Bangladesh Nationalist Party politician and a former member of the Bangladesh Parliament of women's reserved seat.She died last month 09 th january 2025. She was 81.

== Career ==
Kabir was elected to parliament from women's reserved seat as a Bangladesh Nationalist Party candidate in 1979.
