= Moin Uddin Sarkar =

Bangladeshi politician (1929–1998)

- ময়েন উদ্দিন সরকার

Member of Parliament for Rangpur-7
- In office 18 February 1979 – 12 February 1982
- Preceded by: Anisul Haque Chowdhury
- Succeeded by: Seats abolished

Personal details
- Born: Mohammad Moin Uddin Sarkar; 29 March 1929 Gangachara Upazila, Rangpur District, British India (now Bangladesh)
- Died: 15 March 1998 (aged 68)
- Party: Bangladesh Nationalist Party

Moin Uddin Sarkar (29 March 1929 – 15 March 1998) was a Bangladeshi politician. He was elected a member of parliament for Rangpur-7 in the 1979 Bangladeshi general election for the Bangladesh Nationalist Party.

== Early life and education ==
Sarkar was born on 29 March 1929 in Kisamot Sherpur village, Gangachara Upazila, Rangpur District, British India (now Bangladesh). He graduated with a Bachelor of Arts.

== Career ==
Sarkar was elected Chairman of Betgari Union in 1973. In 1977 he was re-elected to the post. He held the post until 1984. He was elected a member of parliament for constituency Rangpur-7 as a Bangladesh Nationalist Party candidate in the 1979 Bangladeshi general election.

== Death ==
Sarkar died on 15 March 1998, at the age of 68.
