= Syed Masood Rumi =

Bangladeshi politician

Member of Bangladesh Parliament
- In office 1979–1986

Personal details
- Born: July 1915 Khoksa, Kushtia District
- Died: August 18, 1995 (Aged 80)
- Party: Bangladesh Nationalist Party

Syed Masood Rumi (Bengali: সৈয়দ মাসউদ রুমি) is a Bangladesh Nationalist Party politician and a former member of parliament for Kushtia-4.

== Career ==
Rumi was elected to parliament from Kushtia-6 as a Bangladesh Nationalist Party candidate in 1979.
