= Rezaul Haque Sarkar =

Bangladeshi politician

Member of Bangladesh Parliament
- In office 1979–1986

Personal details
- Political party: Bangladesh Nationalist Party

Rezaul Haque Sarkar is a Bangladesh Nationalist Party politician and a former member of parliament for Rangpur-9.

== Career ==
Sarkar was elected to parliament from Rangpur-9 as a Bangladesh Nationalist Party candidate in 1979.
