= MA Sattar (politician) =

Bangladeshi politician

Member of Bangladesh Parliament
- In office 18 February 1979 – 12 February 1982

Personal details
- Political party: Bangladesh Nationalist Party

MA Sattar (Bengali: এম এ সাত্তার) is a Bangladesh Nationalist Party politician and a former member of parliament for Dhaka-31.

== Career ==
Sattar was elected to parliament from Dhaka-31 as a Bangladesh Nationalist Party candidate in 1979.
