= Taslima Abed =

Bangladeshi politician

Member of Parliament for Reserved Women's Seat-1
- In office 7 April 1973 – 6 November 1975
- Preceded by: Post established
- Succeeded by: Hasina Rahman
- In office 2 April 1979 – 24 March 1982
- Preceded by: Nazma Shamima Laiju
- Succeeded by: Hosne Ara Ahsan

State Minister of Women and Children Affairs
- In office 1980–1982
- President: Ziaur Rahman; Abdus Sattar (acting)

Personal details
- Party: Awami League

Taslima Abed (Bengali: তাসলিমা আবেদ) was a Bangladeshi women's right activist and member of the Awami League party. She also served as a Member of Parliament and the State Minister of Women and Children Affairs.

== Career ==
Abed was a Jatiya Sangsad member holding a reserved women's seat during 1973–1975 and 1979–1982. She was the founding treasurer of the Kendrio Mohila Punorbashon Songstha, a foundation dedicated to aid the women raped by members of Pakistan military forces during the Bangladesh Liberation war and founded by Sufia Kamal. The foundation had rehabilitation programs for rape victims in Eskaton, Dhaka. In 1974, the Government of Bangladesh renamed the foundation Bangladesh Women's Rehabilitation and Welfare Foundation and it was attached to the Ministry of Women and Children Affairs.

In 1980, Abed served as the State Minister of Women and Children Affairs. She led the Bangladesh delegation to the Convention on the Elimination of All forms of Discrimination Against Women in July 1980 in Copenhagen. She said that economic independence for women is necessary for the development of the nation. She said "In economic independence you get honor".
