= Mollah Maqbool Hossain =

Bangladeshi politician

- মোল্লা মকবুল হোসেন

Member of Parliament for Jessore-14
- In office 18 February 1979 – 12 February 1982
- Preceded by: Seats start
- Succeeded by: Seats abolished

Personal details
- Party: Bangladesh Nationalist Party

Mollah Maqbool Hossain is a Bangladeshi politician. He is a member of the Bangladesh Nationalist Party. He was elected a member of parliament from Jessore-14 in the 1979 Bangladeshi general election.

== Career ==
Mollah Maqbool Hossain was elected a Member of Parliament from the Jessore-14 constituency as a Bangladesh Nationalist Party candidate in the 1979 Bangladeshi general election.
