= Mohammad Elias (Rangpur politician) =

Bangladeshi politician

Member of Bangladesh Parliament
- In office 1979–1986

Personal details
- Party: Bangladesh Nationalist Party

Mohammad Elias is a Bangladesh Nationalist Party politician and a former member of parliament for Rangpur-8.

== Career ==
Elias was elected to parliament from Rangpur-8 as a Bangladesh Nationalist Party candidate in 1979.
