= AKSKM Afzal Hossain =

Bangladeshi politician

Member of Bangladesh Parliament
- In office 1979–1986

Personal details
- Political party: Bangladesh Nationalist Party

AKSKM Afzal Hossain (Bengali: এ কে এস কে এম আফজাল হোসেন) is a Bangladesh Nationalist Party politician and a former member of parliament for Rajshahi-12.

== Career ==
Hossain was elected to parliament from Rajshahi-12 as a Bangladesh Nationalist Party candidate in 1979.
