= Mojibur Rahman (Kishoreganj politician) =

Bangladeshi politician

Member of Bangladesh Parliament
- In office 18 February 1979 – 12 February 1982

Personal details
- Political party: Bangladesh Nationalist Party

Mojibur Rahman (Bengali: মজিবুর রহমান) is a Bangladesh Nationalist Party politician and a former member of parliament for Mymensingh-24.

== Career ==
Rahman was elected to parliament from Mymensingh-24 as a Bangladesh Nationalist Party candidate in 1979.
