= Raushan Elahi =

Bangladeshi politician

Member of Bangladesh Parliament
- In office February 1996 – June 2001
- In office 1991 – 30 March 1996

Personal details
- Party: Bangladesh Nationalist Party

Raushan Elahi is a Bangladesh Nationalist Party politician and a member of the Bangladesh Parliament from a reserved seat.

== Career ==
Elahi was elected to parliament from a reserved seat as a Bangladesh Nationalist Party candidate in 1979. She was elected to parliament again in 1991, and was re-elected in February 1996.
