= Dil Mohammad =

Bangladeshi politician

M/Dil Mohammad

Member of Bangladesh Parliament
- In office 2005–2005

Personal details
- Political party: Bangladesh Nationalist Party

Dil Mohammad (Bengali: দিল মোহাম্মদ) is a Bangladesh Nationalist Party politician and a former member of parliament for Bangladesh refugee-18.

== Career ==
Mohammad was elected to parliament from Rajshahi-18 as a Bangladesh Nationalist Party candidate in 1979.
