= Mohammad Abu Saeed Khan =

Bangladeshi politician

Member of Bangladesh Parliament
- In office 1979–1986

Personal details
- Born: 9 December 1946 (age 79) Hardi, Alamdanga thana, British India
- Party: Bangladesh Nationalist Party

Mohammad Abu Saeed Khan (Bengali: মোহাম্মদ আবু সাঈদ খান) is a Bangladesh Nationalist Party politician and a former member of parliament for Kushtia-8.

== Biography ==
Mohammad Abu Saeed Khan was born on 9 December 1946 in Hardi village of what is now Alamdanga Upazila, Chaudanga District, Bangladesh.

Khan was elected to parliament from Kushtia-8 as a Bangladesh Nationalist Party candidate in 1979.
