= Mohammad Momin Ullah =

Bangladeshi politician

Member of Bangladesh Parliament
- In office 18 February 1979 – 12 February 1982

Personal details
- Political party: Bangladesh Nationalist Party

Mohammad Momin Ullah (Bengali: মোহাম্মদ মমিন উল্লাহ) is a Bangladesh Nationalist Party politician and a former member of parliament for Noakhali-9.

== Career ==
Ullah was elected to parliament from Noakhali-9 as a Bangladesh Nationalist Party candidate in 1979.
