= Abdul Motaleb Khan Pathan =

Bangladeshi politician

Member of the Bangladesh Parliament for Mymensingh-14
- In office 18 February 1979 – 12 February 1982

Personal details
- Political party: Jatiya Samajtantrik Dal

Abdul Motaleb Khan Pathan (Bengali: আব্দুল মোত্তালিব খান পাঠান) is a Jatiya Samajtantrik Dal politician and a former member of parliament for Mymensingh-14.

== Career ==
Pathan was elected to parliament from Mymensingh-14 as a Jatiya Samajtantrik Dal candidate in 1979.
