= Ahmad Nazir =

Bangladeshi politician

- আহমদ নজীর

Member of Parliament for Noakhali-7
- In office 18 February 1979 – 12 February 1982
- Preceded by: Nurul Haque

Personal details
- Born: Noakhali
- Party: Bangladesh Nationalist Party
- Education: Noakhali Zilla School

Ahmad Nazir is a politician from Noakhali District of Bangladesh. He was elected a member of parliament from Noakhali-7 in 1979.
