= Ayesha Sardar =

Bangladeshi politician

Member of Bangladesh Parliament
- In office 18 February 1979 – 12 February 1982

Personal details
- Party: Bangladesh Nationalist Party

Ayesha Sardar (1927-16 February 1988) (Bengali: আয়েশা সরদার) is a Bangladesh Nationalist Party politician and a former member of parliament of women's reserved seat.

== Early life ==
Sardar was born in 1927 in Khanpur, Bagharpara Upazila, Jessore District, East Bengal, British India.

== Career ==
In 1954, Sardar became the chairperson of Muslim League Women Forum. In 1963, she served as a member of Zila Parishad and Divisional Council. She was the commissioner of Jessore Municipality in 1965 and was elected to the East Pakistan Provincial Assembly in the same year. In 1967 she was the chairperson of the Khulna Zone Labour Federation. In 1977, she was a Commissioner of Dhaka Municipality.

In 1978 Sardar became a member of the central committee of Mahila Jagadal and then a member of the Central Committee of Bangladesh Nationalist Party. Sardar was elected to parliament from women's reserved seat as a Bangladesh Nationalist Party candidate in 1979. She served as the vice-president of the Jatiyatabadi Mahila Dal, the women's wing of Bangladesh Nationalist Party. She was the chairperson of Bangladesh Mahila Samaj Kalyan Samiti. She was involved in the development of Jessore District and established 50 educational institutes there.

She served as the president of Jessore District Journalist Association and Jessore Ebaquib Samiti. The President of Pakistan Awarded her the Tamgha-i-Khidmat award for her social work.

== Death ==
Sardar died on 16 February 1988.
