= Abdul Haleem Chowdhury =

Bangladeshi politician

- আবদুল হালিম চৌধুরী
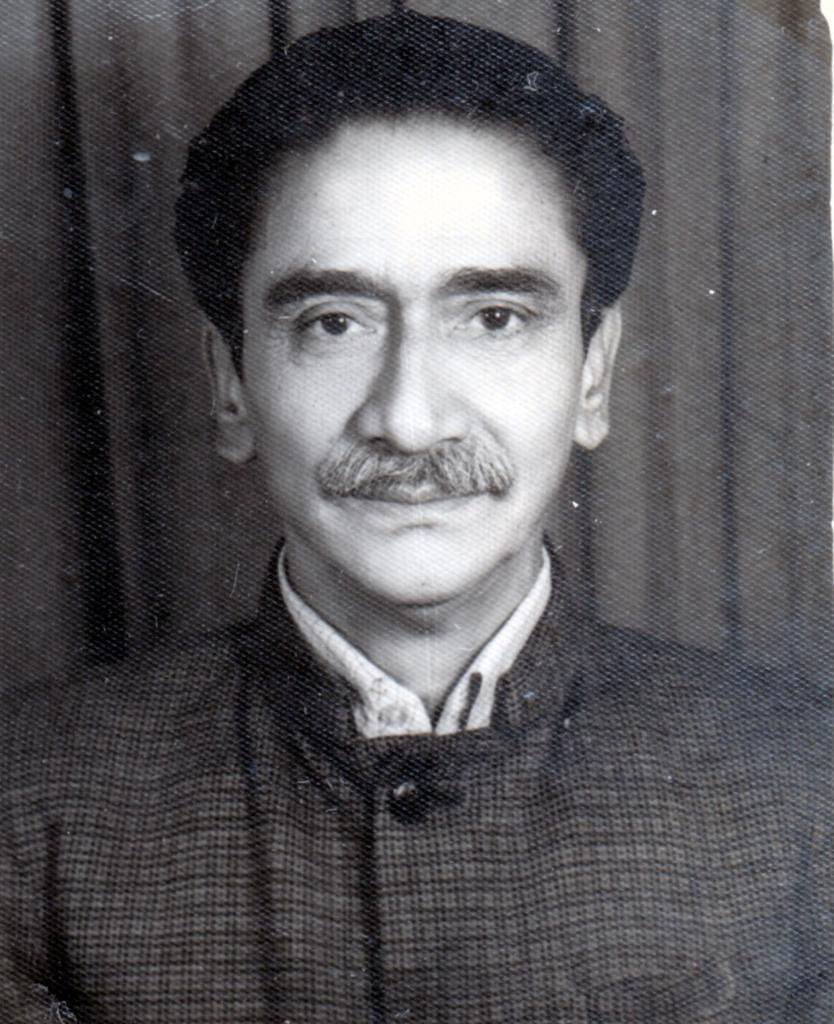

Minister of Agriculture
- In office 29 July 1984 – 15 January 1985
- Preceded by: Abu Zafar Obaidullah
- Succeeded by: Mohammad Abdul Munim

Minister of Food
- In office 12 February 1982 – 24 March 1982
- Preceded by: Abdul Momen Khan
- Succeeded by: Abdul Gafoor Mahmud

Minister of Local Government, Rural Development and Co-operatives
- In office 29 June 1978 – 11 February 1982
- Preceded by: Kazi Anwarul Haque
- Succeeded by: Shah Azizur Rahman

Member of Parliament for Dhaka-2
- In office 2 April 1979 – 24 March 1982
- Preceded by: Moslem Uddin Khan
- Succeeded by: Burhan Uddin Khan

Personal details
- Born: 1 February 1928 Manikganj, Bengal, British India
- Died: 7 October 1987 (aged 59) Dhaka, Bangladesh
- Party: Bangladesh Nationalist Party
- Education: University of Rajshahi

Military service
- Allegiance: Pakistan (before 1971); Bangladesh
- Branch/service: Pakistan Army; Bangladesh Army
- Years of service: 1950 - 1962; 1971-1972
- Rank: Captain
- Unit: Punjab Regiment
- Commands: Adjutant of 1st Punjab Regiment; Sub-commander of Sector – VIII; Sub-commander of Z Force
- Battles/wars: Bangladesh War of Independence

Abdul Haleem Chowdhury (1 February 1928 – 7 October 1987) was a politician of the Bangladesh Nationalist Party, MP, and government minister. He is a retired captain of the Pakistan Army and fought in the 1971 war and established Halim Bahini. His son-in-law is Mafizul Islam Khan Kamal.

== Early life ==
Chowdhury was born on 1 February 1928 in Elachipur, Shivalaya, Manikganj, Bengal Presidency, British India. He graduated from Faridpur Zilla School. He went on to Rajshahi College and finished his BA in economics from Rajshahi University. He started his master's degree at Dhaka University.

== Career ==
Chowdhury joined the Pakistan army in 1950 while still a student. In the army, he served as the Adjutant and Quarter Master in the 1st Punjab Regiment. He served as the aide-de-camp to the GOC of the 14th division. He was the commanding officer of the University Officers' Training Corps Battalion in East Pakistan. In 1962, he retired from the army for health reasons. He joined the East Pakistan Industrial Development Corporation. He was placed in charge of setting up a sugar mill in Kushtia.

In 1966, he joined the National Awami Party. In the 1970 Pakistani general election, he stood as a nominee of the National Awami Party faction led by Muzaffar Ahmed (NAP (M)).

During the Bangladesh War in 1971, he helped set up the revolutionary committee of Manikganj. He was placed in charge of military operations in Dhaka Sadar and Gazipur. He established the Halim Bahini, a paramilitary force under his command, to fight in the war. After the independence of Bangladesh, he stood again as a NAP (M) candidate in the 1973 Bangladeshi general election. He became the president of the United People's Party. In 1979, he was elected to Parliament from the Bangladesh Nationalist Party. He served in the cabinet of President Ziaur Rahman as the minister of Local Government, Rural Development and Cooperative. He later was in the cabinet of President Abdus Sattar as the minister of Food and Relief. He was a member of the BNP's national executive committee. He joined General Hussain Muhammad Ershad's Jatiya party after it came to power. He was the minister of Agriculture and Food.

== Death ==
Chowdhury died on 7 October 1987.
