= Mohammad Mostafizur Rahman =

Bangladeshi politician

Member of Bangladesh Parliament
- In office 1979–1986

Personal details
- Party: Bangladesh Nationalist Party

Mohammad Mostafizur Rahman (Bengali: মোহাম্মদ মোস্তাফিজুর রহমান) is a Bangladesh Nationalist Party politician and a former member of parliament for Rajshahi-17.

== Career ==
Rahman was elected to parliament from Rajshahi-17 as a Bangladesh Nationalist Party candidate in 1979.
