= Gazi Ershad Ali =

Bangladeshi politician

Member of Bangladesh Parliament
- In office 1979–1986

Personal details
- Party: Bangladesh Nationalist Party

Gazi Ershad Ali (Bengali: গাজী এরশাদ আলী) is a Bangladesh Nationalist Party politician and a former member of parliament for Jessore-7.

== Career ==
Ali was elected to parliament for Jessore-7 as a Bangladesh Nationalist Party candidate in 1979.

== Death ==
Ali died on 23 February 2007.
