= Hasina Rahman =

Bangladeshi politician

Member of Bangladesh Parliament
- In office 18 February 1979 – 12 February 1982

Personal details
- Political party: Bangladesh Nationalist Party

Hasina Rahman (Bengali: হাসিনা রহমান) is a Bangladesh Nationalist Party politician and a former member of the Bangladesh Parliament of women's reserved seat.

She was wife of Advocate Aminur Rahman. She has 4 children. 2 sons and 2 daughters. 1st son Mridul Rahman lives in USA and 2nd son Mrinal Rahman lives in Dinajpur with his family.

== Career ==
Rahman was elected to parliament from women's reserved seat as a Bangladesh Nationalist Party candidate in 1979.
