= M Anwar Ullah =

Bangladeshi politician

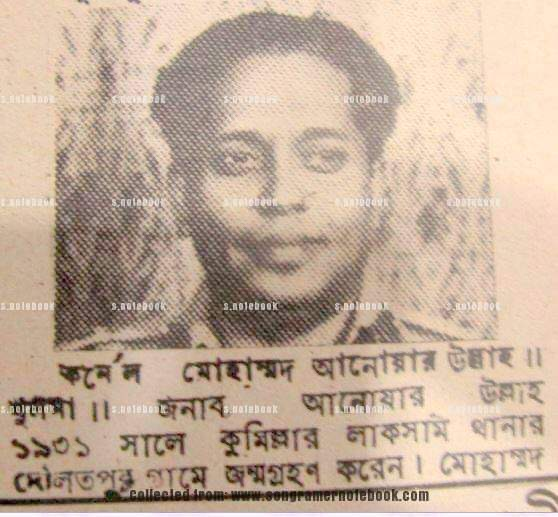

Member of Bangladesh Parliament
- In office 18 February 1979 – 12 February 1982

Personal details
- Born: 1 October 1931 (age 94) Laksam thana, British India
- Party: Bangladesh Nationalist Party

M Anwar Ullah (Bengali: এম আনোয়ার উল্লাহ) is a Bangladesh Nationalist Party politician and a former member of parliament for Comilla-15.

== Biography ==
M Anwar Ullah was born on 1 October 1931 in what is now Laksam Upazila, Comilla District, Bangladesh.

Ullah was elected to parliament from Comilla-15 as a Bangladesh Nationalist Party candidate in 1979.
