= MA Mottalib =

Bangladeshi politician

Member of Bangladesh Parliament
- In office 18 February 1979 – 12 February 1982

Personal details
- Party: Bangladesh Nationalist Party

MA Mottalib (Bengali: এম এ মোত্তালিব; 1941-1994) was a Bangladesh Nationalist Party politician and a former member of parliament for Sylhet-18.

== Career ==
Mottalib was elected to parliament from Sylhet-18 as a Bangladesh Nationalist Party candidate in 1979.
