= Abu Ahmad Fazlul Karim =

Bangladeshi politician

Dr. Abu Ahmad Fazlul Karim Bhuiyan
- আবু আহমদ ফজলুল করিম

Member of Parliament for Mymensingh-20
- In office 18 February 1979 – 12 February 1982

Personal details
- Born: 1928 Nayapara, Chowddo Shata, Kishoreganj
- Died: 29 April 1987 (aged 58–59)
- Party: Bangladesh Nationalist Party
- Education: Dhaka Medical College; Dhaka College

Abu Ahmad Fazlul Karim (Bengali: আবু আহমদ ফজলুল করিম; 1928 – 29 April 1987) was a Bangladeshi politician and physician. He was a member of parliament for Mymensingh-20 and also a state minister.

== Early life and education ==
Fazlul Karim was born in 1928 to a Bengali Muslim family of Bhuiyans in the village of Nayapara in Kishoreganj, Mymensingh district, Bengal Presidency. He was the son of Ibrahim Bhuiyan and Raushan Ara Binu.

After completing his primary education, he passed his matriculation from Kodalia SI High School in 1945, ISC from Dhaka Intermediate College in 1947, and MBBS from Dhaka Medical College in 1953.

== Career ==
Fazlul Karim was a doctor. He became involved in politics during his student life. He was elected to parliament from Mymensingh-20 as a Bangladesh Nationalist Party candidate in 1979.

In Ziaur Rahman's cabinet, he served as the state minister for health and birth control. He also served as the state minister for public works. In Abdus Sattar's cabinet, he served as the state minister for radio, sports, and culture.

== Death ==
Fazlul Karim died on 29 April 1987.
