= Abul Kashem (Dhaka politician) =

Bangladeshi politician

Member of Bangladesh Parliament
- In office 18 February 1979 – 12 February 1982

Personal details
- Party: Bangladesh Nationalist Party

Abul Kashem (Bengali: আবুল কাশেম) is a Bangladesh Nationalist Party politician and a former member of parliament for Dhaka-16.

== Career ==
Abul Kashem was a sub-sector commander of the Mukti Bahini during Bangladesh Liberation War in 1971.

Abul Kashem was elected to parliament from Dhaka-16 as a Bangladesh Nationalist Party candidate in 1979. He served as the minister of youth development in the cabinet of President Abdus Sattar.

== Death ==
Abul Kashem died on 18 July 2020 and was buried in Comilla Adarsha Sadar Upazila in his family graveyard.
