= Abdul Mannan Sikder =

Bangladeshi politician

Member of Bangladesh Parliament
- In office 18 February 1979 – 12 February 1982

Personal details
- Political party: Bangladesh Nationalist Party

Abdul Mannan Sikder (Bengali: আব্দুল মান্নান শিকদার) is a Bangladesh Nationalist Party politician and a former member of parliament for Faridpur-16.

== Career ==
Sikder was elected to parliament from Faridpur-16 as a Bangladesh Nationalist Party candidate in 1979.
