= Mohammad Ismail (Bangladeshi politician) =

Bangladeshi politician

Member of Bangladesh Parliament
- In office 18 February 1979 – 12 February 1982

Personal details
- Political party: Bangladesh Nationalist Party

Mohammad Ismail (Bengali: মোহাম্মদ ইসমাইল) is a Bangladesh Nationalist Party politician and a former member of parliament for Noakhali-11.

== Career ==
Ismail was elected to parliament from Noakhali-11 as a Bangladesh Nationalist Party candidate in 1979.
