= Khondakar Abdul Hamid =

Bangladeshi politician

- Born: 1 March 1918; Kasba village, Sherpur District, Bengal Presidency, British India
- Died: 22 October 1983 (aged 65); Dhaka, Bangladesh
- Education: Calcutta University

Khondakar Abdul Hamid (1 March 1918 – 22 October 1983) was a Bangladeshi journalist and politician. He was awarded Ekushey Padak for journalism in 1977 by the government of Bangladesh.

== Early life and education ==
Hamid was born in Kasba village in Sherpur District to Khondakar Abdul Latif, a commissioner of Sherpur Municipality and Begum Amirunnesa. Hamid passed matriculation the examination in 1935 from Govindapur Peace Memorial High School and IA examination from Ananda Mohan College in 1937. Then he graduated from Calcutta University in 1940.

== Career ==
Hamid was assistant editor of the Daily Ittehad of Calcutta during 1946-1948 and chairman of the Board of Editors of the Daily Millat during 1953–1956. He actively joined politics at the time of 'Jukta Front'and became a member of the Provincial Assembly in 1954 and 1965. He served as the Secretary of the Parliamentary Party in the then East Pakistan Assembly from 1956 to 1958. He was imprisoned during the rule of General Iskander Mirza under article 92-A in 1954. He served as the editor of the Daily Azad in 1969. He later joined The Daily Ittefaq as senior lead writer in 1973. He became an admired columnist for his writings as 'Spashtabhashi' in 'Daily Ittefaq's post-editorial 'Manche Nepathye'. He was later appointed as the chairman of the board of editors of Dainik Desh in 1982.
