= R. A. Ghani =

Bangladeshi politician (1927–2016)

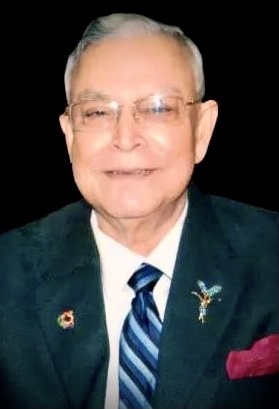
- Ghani in 2008

Member of Parliament for Rangpur-19
- In office 2 April 1979 – 24 March 1982
- Preceded by: Mohammad Lutfor Rahman
- Succeeded by: Constituency Dissolved

Personal details
- Born: 1927; Bosniapara, Sadullapur, Gaibandha, Rangpur, Bengal Presidency, British India
- Died: 15 January 2016 (aged 89); Square Hospital, Dhaka, Bangladesh

R. A. Ghani (1927 – 15 January 2016) was a Bangladeshi engineer and Bangladesh Nationalist Party politician. He was a member of the Jatiya Sangsad, and served as the state minister of Science and Technology.

== Biography ==
Ghani was born in 1927 at Bosniapara in Sadullapur of Gaibandha. He passed his matriculation exams from Gaibandha Boys' School ranked 13th in the combined merit list. He passed his intermediate exams from Presidency College in Calcutta. He completed graduation from Ahsanullah Engineering College (now BUET) in civil engineering in 1952. During this time Ghani took part in the Language Movement.

In 1953, Ghani founded Brixton & Brixton Ltd (now GBL - Ganibangla Ltd), which describes itself as the oldest consulting engineering firm in Bangladesh.

He completed an MS from University of California, Berkeley in 1963, and completed a DSc degree from Washington University in St. Louis.

He took part in the 1969 Mass uprising in East Pakistan and the Liberation War of Bangladesh.

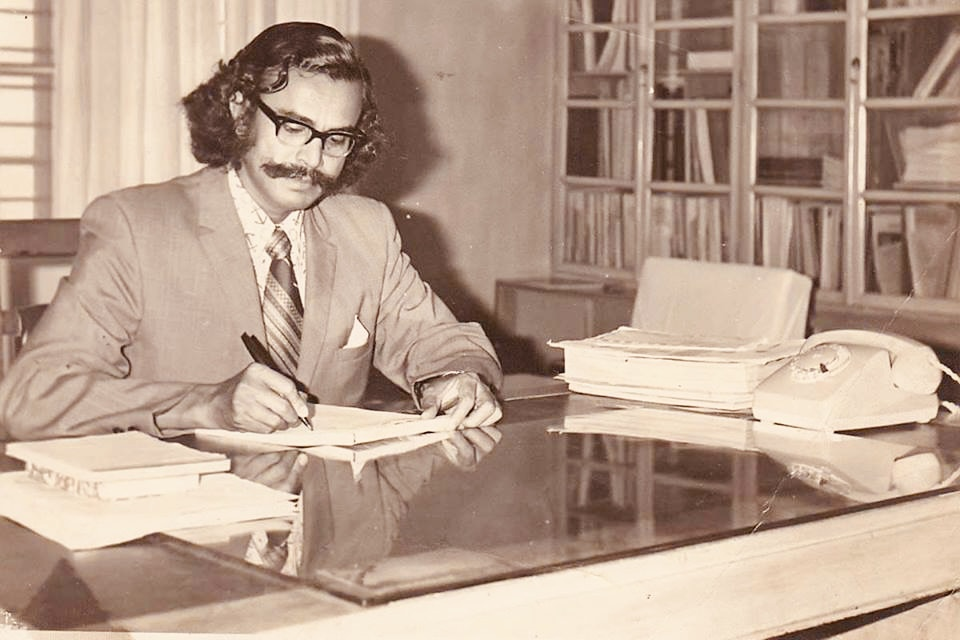
Ghani in the early 1970s

Ghani was elected as a member of the Jatiya Sangsad from Rangpur-19 in 1979. He was appointed State Minister of Science and Technology during the reign of Ziaur Rahman. He was a member of the standing committee of the Bangladesh Nationalist Party.

He founded R A Gani School & College, Gaibandha.

He was married to Mrs. Hosne Ara Ghani. They had three daughters and a son.

Ghani died on 15 January 2016, aged 89, at Square Hospital in Dhaka.
