= Emran Ali Sarkar =

Bangladeshi politician

Member of Bangladesh Parliament
- In office 1979–1986

Personal details
- Born: 1912 Rajshahi
- Died: 12 December 2007 (aged 94–95) Rajshahi
- Political party: Bangladesh Nationalist Party

Emran Ali Sarkar (Bengali: এমরান আলী সরকার) is a Bangladesh Nationalist Party politician and a former member of parliament for Rajshahi-11.

== Career ==
Sarkar was elected to parliament from Rajshahi-11 as a Bangladesh Nationalist Party candidate in 1979.

== Death ==
Sarkar died on 12 December 2007.
