= Aftabuzzaman =

Bangladeshi politician

Member of Bangladesh Parliament
- In office 18 February 1979 – 1986

Personal details
- Party: Bangladesh Nationalist Party

Aftabuzzaman (Bengali: আফতাবুজ্জামান) is a Bangladesh Nationalist Party politician and a former member of parliament for Khulna-12. He is a former state minister of fisheries and livestock.

== Career ==
Aftabuzzaman was elected to parliament from Khulna-12 as a Bangladesh Nationalist Party candidate in 1979.
