= Abdul Momen Khan =

Bangladeshi politician

- আবদুল মোমেন খান

Minister of Food
- In office 14 July 1977 – 11 February 1982
- Preceded by: Abdul Gafoor Mahmud
- Succeeded by: Abdul Haleem Chowdhury

Member of the Bangladesh Parliament for Dhaka-27
- In office 18 February 1979 – 24 March 1982
- Preceded by: Sadat Ali Sikder
- Succeeded by: Position Abolished

Personal details
- Born: 1 October 1919 Dhaka, Bengal Presidency, British India
- Died: 12 December 1984 (aged 65) Dhaka, Bangladesh
- Party: Bangladesh Nationalist Party
- Children: Abdul Moyeen Khan
- Education: University of Dhaka

Abdul Momen Khan (1 October 1919 – 12 December 1984) was a Bangladesh Nationalist Party politician.

== Education and career ==
While a student, Khan was elected the first speaker of the Students Union of the newly founded Fazlul Huq Hall of the University of Dhaka. He completed his bachelor's with honours and then a master's in economics from the University of Dhaka in 1941 and joined as a faculty member at the Calcutta Government Commercial College in 1942. In 1954, he joined the Pakistan Civil Service. He rose to the highest position of civil service in Bangladesh as the cabinet secretary before joining politics in 1977, being assigned the portfolio of food in the cabinet formed by President Ziaur Rahman.

Momen Khan was a founder member of the newly formed National Democratic Party (JAGODAL), a member of its first central convening committee, and later also a founding member of the Bangladesh Nationalist Party and its vice president. He served as the minister of food during 1977–1982.

Khan was elected as a member of the Jatiya Sangsad in 1979 with the nomination from BNP.
