= Kazi Anwarul Haque =

Pakistani politician

Kazi Anwarul Haque (also spelled Anwarul Huque) was a Bangladeshi police officer, bureaucrat, and technocrat minister.

== Early life ==
Haque was born on 8 February 1909 in Dhaka, East Bengal, British Raj. His father was a notable writer, Kazi Imdadul Huq. In 1932, he graduated from Dhaka University and joined the Indian Police Service.

== Career ==
Anwarul Haque served in both East and West Bengal as superintendent of Police. He moved to East Pakistan after the partition of India. He served as the Superintendent of Police in Chittagong District. He was promoted in 1953 to Deputy Inspector General and in 1958 to Inspector General of Police. The government transferred him from the police service to the civil service. In 1961 he was promoted to Chief Secretary of the East Pakistan government. He was the first Bengali to become the Chief Secretary. From 1963 to 1965 he was the chairman of the Pakistan Central Public Service Commission.

Anwarul Haque was appointed the Education Minister of Pakistan in 1965. He was also the Minister of Health, Labour and Social Welfare. He retired in 1969 and joined the private sector. In 1975, following the Assassination of Sheikh Mujibur Rahman in the 15 August 1975 Bangladesh coup d'état, he joined the Council of Advisors and Ministers. He served in the cabinets of President Abu Sadat Mohammad Sayem, President Ziaur Rahman, and President Abdus Sattar. After retirement he wrote his memoir, Under Three Flags: Reminiscence of a Public Servant, about serving under the British, Pakistani, and Bangladeshi governments. In 1991, he wrote Quest of Freedom about the Bangladesh Liberation war.

== Death ==
Anwarul Haque died in November 2001.
