= Syed Mahibul Hasan =

Bangladeshi politician

- সৈয়দ মহিবুল হাসান

Member of the Bangladesh Parliament for Sylhet-16 (now defunct)
- In office 18 February 1979 – 12 February 1982
- Preceded by: Gias Uddin Chowdhury
- Succeeded by: Syed Mohammad Qaisar

Personal details
- Born: 1924 Narapati, Sylhet district, British India
- Party: Pakistan Muslim League; Bangladesh Nationalist Party; Jatiya Party
- Children: Syeda Rizwana Hasan

Syed Mahibul Hasan was a Bangladeshi politician. He served as a Jatiya Sangsad member representing the Sylhet-16 (now defunct) constituency and later joined the Bangladesh Nationalist Party, serving as a minister under President Ziaur Rahman.

== Early life and education ==
Hasan was born in 1924 at Narapati village in what was then Sylhet district of British India (now under Chunarughat Union of Habiganj District, Bangladesh). He earned a B. A. from Calcutta University and became a lawyer.

== Career ==
Hasan stood as a Muslim League candidate in the 1962 Pakistani provincial election, winning a seat in the East Pakistan Provincial Assembly. In the 1965 Pakistani provincial election he contested the PE-117 Sylhet-VII seat. It was won by Syed Sayeed-ud-Din Ahmad.

Hasan contested the Sylhet-III (Bahubal, Chunarghat, and Srimangal) constituency of the National Assembly in 1970 as an independent candidate. A. K. Latifur Rahman Chowdhury of the Awami League won the seat by a wide margin.

Hasan competed in the 1979 Bangladeshi general election as an independent candidate, winning a seat in the Sylhet-16 constituency. He later joined the Bangladesh Nationalist Party and served as the Minister of Labour in the cabinet of President Ziaur Rahman. During the presidency of Abdus Sattar, Hasan served as the State Minister of Industries and Commerce. In the 1986 Bangladeshi general election, he independently contested for the Habiganj-3 constituency but lost to National Awami Party politician Chowdhury Abdul Hai. Hasan later joined the Jatiya Party, but retired from politics following the 1990 Mass Uprising.

He died before May 2015, and is buried in Narapati village, Chunarughat Upazila, Habiganj District, Bangladesh.

== Personal life ==
Hasan was married to Suraiya Hasan and they had a daughter, Rizwana Hasan. Rizwana is a lawyer and environmentalist.
