= Amirul Islam Kalam =

Bangladeshi politician

Member of the Bangladesh Parliament for Noakhali-14
- In office 7 March 1973 – 24 March 1982
- Preceded by: Position Established
- Succeeded by: Position Abolished

Personal details
- Born: 1928 or 1929
- Party: Bangladesh Nationalist Party
- Other political affiliations: Jatiya Samajtantrik Dal

Amirul Islam Kalam (Bengali: আমিরুল ইসলাম কালাম; born 1928 or 1929) was a member of the Bangladesh Parliament for Noakhali-14.

== Career ==
In 1964 he was elected to provincial Assembly of East Pakistan on the ticket of Muslim League. He was elected to the Provincial Assembly of East Pakistan for Noakhali-XIV (Hatiya) as an independent candidate in January 1971.

Later he joined the Jatiya Samajtantrik Dal and was elected to parliament from Noakhali-14 in 1973. He was re-elected in 1979 as a Bangladesh Nationalist Party candidate.
