= Shah Azizur Rahman =

Prime Minister of Bangladesh from 1979 to 1982

- শাহ আজিজুর রহমান

4th Prime Minister of Bangladesh
- In office 15 April 1979 – 24 March 1982
- President: Ziaur Rahman; Abdus Sattar
- Deputy: Moudud Ahmed; A. Q. M. Badruddoza Chowdhury; Jamal Uddin Ahmad; S. A. Bari
- Preceded by: Mashiur Rahman (acting)
- Succeeded by: Ataur Rahman Khan

Minister of Education
- In office 15 April 1979 – 11 February 1982
- Preceded by: Abdul Baten
- Succeeded by: Tafazzal Hossain Khan

Member of the Bangladesh Parliament for Kushtia-3
- In office 18 February 1979 – 24 March 1982
- Preceded by: M Amir-ul Islam
- Succeeded by: Syed Altaf Hossain

Member of National Assembly of Pakistan
- In office 12 January 1965 – 25 March 1969
- Preceded by: Md. Abdul Haque
- Succeeded by: Position Abolished
- Constituency: NE-33 (Kushtia-I)

Personal details
- Born: 23 November 1925 Kushtia, Bengal, British India
- Died: 1 September 1989 (aged 63) Dhaka, Bangladesh
- Party: BNP(S) (1985–1989)
- Other political affiliations: BNP (1978–1985); BML (1976–1978); PNL (1969–1971); AL (1964–1969); NDF (1962–1964); PML (1950–1958)

Shah Azizur Rahman (Bengali: শাহ আজিজুর রহমান; 23 November 1925 – 1 September 1989) was a Bangladeshi politician who served as the prime minister of Bangladesh. However, he was the subject of considerable controversy for his collaboration with the Pakistan Army against the struggle for the independence of Bangladesh.

== Early life ==
Shah Azizur Rahman was born in Kushtia, Bengal (now in Bangladesh), on 23 November 1925. He received his Bachelor of Arts degree in English language and literature from Calcutta University and went on to study at Dhaka University. He held the position of general secretary in the All Bengal Muslim Student League from 1945 to 1947. As a student political leader, Azizur Rahman participated in the Bengal Provincial Muslim League and the Pakistan movement. After the partition of India, he served as joint secretary of the East Pakistan Muslim League. He opposed the Bengali language movement of 1952. He would remain active in Bengali and national politics in Pakistan, becoming a vocal opponent of Bengali leader Sheikh Mujibur Rahman and his Awami League, which advocated greater autonomy for East Pakistan.

== Political career ==
Azizur Rahman was the general secretary of the East Pakistan Muslim League from 1952 to 1958. In 1962, he participated in the Pakistan National Assembly elections from Kushtia but lost. He joined the National Democratic Front led by Huseyn Shaheed Suhrawardy in 1962. In March 1964, he joined the Awami League and was subsequently elected vice-president of the Pakistan Awami League. In 1965, he was elected to the National Assembly from Kushtia and served as the deputy leader of the opposition from 1965 to 1969. He was one of the defense lawyers in the Agartala Conspiracy Case.

At the outbreak of the Bangladesh War of Independence, Azizur Rahman supported the Pakistani state forces and denounced the Bengali nationalist struggle. He led the Pakistani delegation to the United Nations in November 1971, where he would emphatically deny that the Pakistan Army's Operation Searchlight had degenerated into genocide. In 1971, following the defeat of Pakistan in the war, Azizur Rahman was arrested under the collaborators act but was released in 1973 under a general amnesty by Prime Minister Sheikh Mujib. In the post-war period, authorities estimated that over a million people had been killed in Bangladesh by Pakistani state forces and collaborating militias. Azizur Rahman would continue to lobby Muslim nations in the Middle East to decline diplomatic recognition to Bangladesh.

After the assassination of Sheikh Mujib, he joined the revived Muslim League in Bangladesh in 1976. He then joined the newly founded Bangladesh Nationalist Party of President Ziaur Rahman in 1978 and was made the minister of labor and industry in Ziaur Rahman's cabinet. When Ziaur Rahman had become the president of Bangladesh, he initially decided to appoint Mashiur Rahman Jadu Mia as prime minister, but after Mashiur Rahman's sudden death on 12 March 1979, Shah Azizur Rahman was appointed to office on 15 April 1979. It is believed that Ziaur Rahman preferred candidates such as Badruddoza Chowdhury or Saifur Rahman for the job. However, he also wanted the party's parliamentarians to choose their leader through a secret ballot, which Shah Aziz managed to win so that Ziaur Rahman could not ignore him.

As prime minister, Shah Azizur Rahman helped ratify the infamous Indemnity Act promulgated by Khondaker Mostaq Ahmed. Shah Azizur Rahman also helped Zia organize the Bangladesh Nationalist Party, which won the 1979 parliamentary elections. After the assassination of Ziaur Rahman in 1981, Shah Azizur Rahman continued to serve as prime minister. Although he was retained in that post by the new President Abdus Sattar, both Abdus Sattar and Azizur Rahman were overthrown in a military coup led by army chief Hossain Mohammad Ershad in 1982.

== Death ==
Shah Aziz died in Dhaka on 1 September 1989 at the age of 63.

After the fall of the Sheikh Hasina led Awami League government, the Sheikh Mujibur Rahman Hall of the Islamic University, Bangladesh was renamed to Shah Azizur Rahman Hall.

== See also ==
- Azizur Rahman ministry

Political offices
| Preceded by Mashiur Rahman; Acting | Prime Minister of Bangladesh; 1979–1982 | Succeeded by Ataur Rahman Khan |
