= Reserved political positions =

Practice of ensuring minority participation in government

In government, several constitutional arrangements use reserved political positions, especially when endeavoring to ensure the rights of women, minorities or other segments of society, or preserving a political balance of power.

== Countries with reserved seats ==
=== Europe ===
==== Armenia ====
Since the 2015 Armenian constitutional referendum, electoral law requires that four seats for ethnic minorities (one for Russians, Yezidis, Assyrians and Kurds each) are allocated in the National Assembly.

==== Belgium ====
The Parliament of the Brussels-Capital Region in Belgium includes 17 reserved seats for the Flemish minority and the government needs the support from the majority of the Flemish minority, on a total of 89, but there are no separate electorates.

Similarly, the Belgian seats of the European Parliament are mainly distributed among two constituencies: a Walloon/Francophone and Flemish/Dutchophone one. The German minority gets one seat reserved.

==== Croatia ====
Croatia reserves eight seats from the minorities and three for citizens living abroad in its parliament. There are three seats for Serbs, one for Italians, and a few more for other ethnic groups, where a single representative represents more than one group (there is only one representative for both Czechs and Slovaks).

==== Cyprus ====
The Republic of Cyprus is full of reserved political positions. Due to its nature as a bi-communal republic, certain posts are always appropriated among Greek Cypriots and Turkish Cypriots. For example, the president is chosen from the Greek Cypriot community by using separate electoral rolls, whereas the vice president is chosen by the Turkish Cypriot community, using their own separate electoral rolls. Similarly 70% of the parliament are chosen from Greek Cypriots whereas 30% are chosen by and from Turkish Cypriots. In the Supreme Court, there should be one Greek Cypriot, one Turkish Cypriot and one neutral foreign judge. The seats reserved for Turkish Cypriots have remained empty since the 1974 Turkish invasion of Cyprus.

==== Denmark ====
The Folketing consists of 179 representatives, including two from Greenland and two from the Faroe Islands.

==== Finland ====
The Parliament of Finland consists of 200 representatives, including one from Åland who usually caucuses with the Swedish People's Party of Finland.

==== Ireland ====
The Seanad Éireann of the Republic of Ireland is primarily elected indirectly, but six members are directed elected by voters who graduated from two Irish universities; following the 2025 Seanad election, suffrage will be expanded to all Irish university graduates regardless of school at the next Seanad election.

==== Kosovo ====
The Assembly of the Republic of Kosovo has 120 directly elected members; 20 are reserved for national minorities as follows:

- 10 seats for the representatives of the Kosovo Serbs.
- 4 seats for the representatives of the Romani, Ashkali and Egyptians.
- 3 seats for the Bosniaks.
- 2 seats for the Turks.
- 1 seat for the Gorani.

Albanian is the official language of the majority, but all languages of minorities such as Serbian, Turkish and Bosnian are used, with simultaneous interpretation.

==== Romania ====
The Parliament of Romania has 467 members as follows:

- 331 seats in the Chamber of Deputies
  - 308 directly elected members
  - 19 for each of the ethnic minorities (can vary based on the number of parties running)
  - 4 for the Romanian diaspora
- 136 seats in the Senate
  - 134 directly elected members
  - 2 for the Romanian diaspora

Romanian ethnic minority parties have to nominally pass a lower threshold (5% of the votes needed to win a seat in the lower chamber, calculated by dividing the number of votes of parties, alliances and independent candidates that passed the threshold by the amount of seats that they won). Thus the threshold is below 0.01% and these seats are effectively reserved for the strongest party of each minority. The only cases where a minority have not reached the threshold are the Union of Croats of Romania in 1992 and 1996 (represented since then), the General Union of the Associations of the Hutsul Ethnicity in 1996 and 2000 and the Union of the Czechs of Romania in 2000 (usually represented as part of the Democratic Union of Slovaks and Czechs of Romania and additionally as their own group, Forum of Czechs in Romania, since 2024).

==== Slovenia ====
The National Assembly of Slovenia has 88 members elected by party-list proportional representation. Another two seats are elected by the Italian and Hungarian ethnic minorities using the Borda count.

==== United Kingdom ====
Political parties are permitted to restrict the selection of their candidates in constituencies to a specific gender under the Sex Discrimination (Election Candidates) Act 2002; to date, only the Labour Party utilises the law.

The UK also reserves 26 seats in the House of Lords for Church of England bishops, who together are known as the Lords Spiritual.

Additionally, there are five 'protected' constituencies in the House of Commons: one for the Northern Isles, one for the Outer Hebrides, one for Anglesey and two for the Isle of Wight.

The First Minister and Deputy First Minister of Northern Ireland are nominated by the largest party of the largest designation (Unionist, Nationalist and "Other") and the largest party of the second largest designation with the largest party in general nominating the First Minister and the other party nominating the Deputy First Minister.

=== Asia ===
==== Bangladesh ====
50 seats out of 350 in the Parliament are reserved for women.

==== China ====
China's National People's Congress (NPC) includes special delegations for the military of China (the single largest NPC delegation (≈9%)) and Taiwan (a region it claims but does not control). 55 minority ethnic groups are recognized in China and each has as at least one delegate, though they belong to normal region delegations. Additionally, from 1954 to 1974, the NPC included a special delegation specifically for Overseas Chinese who returned to China.

===== Hong Kong and Macau =====
Hong Kong and Macau provide for constituencies which represent professional or special interest groups rather than geographical locations. Voters for the members representing these constituencies include both natural persons as well as non-human local entities, including organizations and corporations.

==== India ====
India has seats in the lower house of parliament, state assemblies, local municipal bodies and village-level institutions reserved for Scheduled Castes and Scheduled Tribes, better-known as Dalits and Adivasis respectively. The election of Dalit and tribal candidates is by the general electorate. Out of 543 constituencies in India's parliament, a total of 131 seats (24.13%) are reserved for representatives from Scheduled Castes (84) and Scheduled Tribes (47) only. A new law passed in 2024, Nari Shakti Vandan Adhiniyam proposes 33% reserved seats for women in the parliament and legislative assemblies of India. This is different from separate electorate practiced in other countries. Many Indian states have had parliamentary seats reserved for the Anglo-Indian community.

==== Iran ====
Iran reserves a fixed number of seats in the Majlis for certain recognized non-Muslim ethnoreligious groups. To wit, two seats are reserved for the Christian Armenian community, and one seat each is reserved for the Assyrian, Jewish, and Zoroastrian communities.

==== Iraq ====
83 seats in the Council of Representatives are reserved for women, 9 seats are reserved for minorities (five for Christians and one each for Yazidis, Shabaks, Mandaeans and Feyli Kurds).

==== Jordan ====
Jordan has in its parliament reserved seats for women, Christians, Circassians, Chechens, and Bedouins.

==== Kazakhstan ====
Kazakhstan has reserved 30% of party list position for women, youth, and invalids throughout its representative bodies, and 5 seats in the Senate for ethnic minorities.

==== Lebanon ====
Lebanon’s National Pact specifies the religious affiliation of several high officials, such as the President (Maronite), the Prime Minister (Sunni Muslim) and the Parliament's Speaker (Shia Muslim). Every electoral district for the parliamentary elections includes a fixed number of the various religious communities.

==== Pakistan ====
In the National Assembly of Pakistan, 60 seats are reserved for women and 10 for non-Muslims.

==== Palestinian Authority ====
While the Palestinian Authority makes no reservations within the Palestinian Legislative Council (there were reserved seats for Christians and Samaritans in the electoral law for the 1996 Palestinian general election), certain positions in local government are guaranteed to certain minority groups, in order to retain particular traditional cultural influence and diversity. For example, the mayor of Bethlehem is required to be a Christian, even though the city itself currently has a Muslim majority.

==== Philippines ====
In Congress, no seats are reserved, although sectoral representatives were appointed by the President to the House of Representatives before the introduction of the party-list system.

The Local Government Code also calls for reserved seats in local legislatures for women, workers, and one from the urban poor, indigenous cultural communities, disabled people and other sectors, but for these seats save for the indigenous people, no law except for the indigenous cultural communities, has been passed concerning how these seats will be filled up.

Some local legislatures in the Philippines have a reserved seat for indigenous cultural communities called "Indigenous People Mandatory Representative". These are elected by indigenous peoples themselves.

In the Bangsamoro Parliament, at least eight seats are reserved for certain sectors, which are the youth, women, settler communities, Ulama, traditional leaders, and the Non-Moro Indigenous Peoples.

==== Singapore ====
Group Representation Constituency (GRC) was created in 1988. GRC scheme entrenches the presence of minority MPs in Parliament, ensuring that interests of minority communities are represented in Parliament. In a GRC, a number of candidates comes together to stand for elections to Parliament as a group. Each voter of a GRC casts a ballot for a team of candidates, and not for individual candidates. The original stated purpose of GRCs was to guarantee a minimum representation of minorities in Parliament and ensure that there would always be a multiracial Parliament instead of one made up of a single race.

The office of President will be reserved for a particular racial group (Chinese, Malay and Indian/other minority) — if that community has not been represented for five presidential terms.

==== Taiwan ====
Since 2008, in the Legislative Yuan of Taiwan, of the total 34 seats of party-list proportional representation, at least half of the party-nominated candidates must be reserved for women. For example, if one party elected 3 candidates of the party-list in the Legislative Yuan, 2 of them must be women. Along with this, since the 1970s six seats are reserved for the indigenous people of Taiwan. There are two constituencies consisting of three seats each reserved for the Highland Aborigine people and the Lowland Aborigine people.

=== Africa ===
==== Rwanda ====
In the Parliament of Rwanda, a minimum of 30% of elected members of the 26-member Senate must be women. In the 80-member Chamber of Deputies, 24 of these seats are reserved for women, elected through a joint assembly of local government officials; another 3 seats are reserved for youth and disabled members.

Partly resulting from this arrangement, 45 female deputies were elected to the Parliament in 2008, making the country the first and only independent country to possess a female majority in its national legislature.

==== Tanzania ====
At least 20% of seats in the National Assembly are required to be set aside for women in accordance with Article 66.1(b) of the Constitution. Currently, 113 of 393 (28%) are set aside.

==== Uganda ====
The Ugandan constitution provides for a reserved woman's parliamentary seat from each of the 39 districts.

==== Zimbabwe ====
Historically, Zimbabwe reserved 20 of the 100 seats in Parliament for the white minority, until these seats were abolished by constitutional amendment in 1987. Currently, 60 of the 270 seats in the House of Assembly are reserved for women.

=== Americas ===
==== Argentina ====
Argentine law requires a 50% quota for female candidates for Congress.

==== Canada ====
In the Nova Scotia House of Assembly, "exceptional constituencies" exist to ensure representation of Acadians (Argyle, Clare, and Richmond) and Black Nova Scotians (Preston). In 2024, the Nova Scotia Supreme Court ruled that a fourth Acadian riding should be established in northern Cape Breton.

The Far North Electoral Boundaries Commission by the Legislative Assembly of Ontario mandated the creation of the ridings of Kenora—Rainy River, Kiiwetinong, Mushkegowuk—James Bay, and Timmins for the purpose of enhancing the representation of communities of interest in Ontario's far north, specifically Indigenous and Francophone representation.

==== Colombia ====
Under the 2016 peace agreement brokered between the Colombian government and the FARC rebel group, five seats in the Senate and five seats in the Chamber of Representatives are reserved for former FARC combatants.

==== United States ====
Due to treaties signed by the United States in 1830 and 1835, two Native American tribes (the Cherokee and Choctaw) each hold the right to a non-voting delegate in the United States House of Representatives; as of 2019, only the Cherokee Nation has ever attempted to exercise that right. The Maine House of Representatives reserves three non-voting positions for the Passamaquoddy, Maliseet, and Penobscot tribes via similar treaties.

The Democratic and Republican national committees, as well as their state committees, maintain rules for equal division for women in internal leadership and representative positions.

=== Oceania ===
==== Fiji ====
Fiji once provided for the election of specific numbers of Members of Parliament on the basis of three racially defined constituencies: the indigenous Fijians, the Fijian Indians and the "General" electorate.

==== New Zealand ====
There are currently seven New Zealand Parliament constituencies – known as the Māori electorates – that are reserved for representatives of the Māori people. Māori electorates were introduced in 1867, but have undergone several changes since then. Māori may enroll either in a Māori electorate or on the general roll, but not both. Since 1967 there has not been any specific requirement for candidates in Māori electorates to be Māori themselves, and anyone on either the Māori roll or the general roll can stand as a candidate. Technically, therefore, these seats should not be described as "reserved" as there is no legal or constitutional guarantee that the successful candidate will themselves be of Māori descent. So far, however, every MP from a Māori electorate has been Māori. Also to note, is that under New Zealand's mixed-member proportional (MMP) electoral system, it is the party vote that is most important. All voters, including Māori, are deemed to be on the same master roll in terms of voting for party lists.

== Countries formerly applying reserved political positions ==
=== Afghanistan (2004-2021) ===
During the Islamic Republic of Afghanistan, the constitution guaranteed at least 64 delegates to be female in the lower house of the bicameral National Assembly ("The elections law shall adopt measures to attain, through the electorate system, general and fair representation for all the people of the country, and proportionate to the population of very province, on average, at least two females shall be the elected members of the House of People from each province."), while Kochi nomads elected 10 representatives through a single national constituency. Moreover, "one third of the members (of the House of Elders) shall be appointed by the President, for a five-year term, from amongst experts and experienced personalities, including two members from amongst the impaired and handicapped, as well as two from nomads. The President shall appoint fifty percent of these individuals from amongst women."

=== Eastern Bloc ===
In many communist countries, only a united list of the popular front competed in the elections including de facto reserved seats for mass organisations and bloc parties. East Germany effectively reserved seats in the Volkskammer for representatives of trade unions, women and youth organisations.

=== Eritrea ===
On paper 10 seats out of 105 seats in the National Assembly are reserved for women however the National Assembly has de facto been abolished since 2002.

=== Greece (1920s-1930s) ===
During the 1920s and 1930s there was a system of separate electoral curiae for Muslim and Jewish electors in Greece, with reserved seats.

=== Palestine (British mandate) ===
During the Mandatory Palestine, at the third election (1931) of its Assembly of Representatives, there were three curiae, for the Ashkenazi Jews, the Sephardi Jews and for the Yemeni Jews.

=== Syria ===
Syria enjoyed an electoral system like that in Lebanon for the parliamentary elections up to 1949, when subdivisions among each religion were suppressed. There were reserved seats for Christians up to 1963, when the Ba'athist regime suppressed free elections.

=== Uzbekistan ===
Before the 2019 reforms, fifteen of the 150 seats in the Legislative Chamber of Uzbekistan (the lower chamber of the Oliy Majlis) had been reserved for the Ecological Movement of Uzbekistan under the revised electoral law of 2008. Its legislators were elected at a congress held in conjunction with the 2009–10 Uzbek parliamentary election. One legislator was elected from each territorial subdivision of Uzbekistan (the Republic of Karakalpakstan, provinces, and the city of Tashkent), plus one member from the Executive Committee of the Central Council of the Ecological Movement. Delegates to the congress were elected in equal numbers at the conferences of each of the territorial branches of the Ecological Movement.

== Reserved seats for expatriates ==
- Algeria reserves eight of its 382 parliamentary seats for expatriates, many of whom reside in France.
- Cape Verde has three overseas seats reserved for expatriates
- Colombia reserves one overseas seat to represent all expatriates
- Croatia reserves no more than six seats in parliament for expatriates. The number of seats assigned to emigrants is based on participation rates in the election.
- Ecuador has six parliamentary seats for expatriates
- France reserves 12 seats in the Senate for expatriates, and 11 seats in the National Assembly.
- Italy reserves seats in its Parliament for Italian expatriates, with twelve members of the Chamber of Deputies and six in the Senate representing an overseas constituency.
- Portugal's Assembly of the Republic has four seats reserved for Portuguese living abroad, two for those living in Europe, the other two for those living in other parts of the world.

== Floating reserved seats ==
- In Mauritius, the National Assembly consists of 70 members, 62 elected for a five-year term in a constituency in which 3 are elected in the constituencies of mainland Mauritius and 2 are elected in the constituency of Rodrigues. From 4 up to 8 additional members, known as "best losers" appointed by the Electoral Supervisory Commission "with a view to correct any imbalance in community representation in Parliament".
- New Zealand reserves a proportion of its parliamentary seats for the representation of persons electing to register on a separate Māori roll. The number of seats depends upon the number of people on the roll — there are currently seven seats. See Māori electorates.

== Exemption of the election threshold ==
In several countries, political parties representing recognized ethnic minorities are exempted from the election threshold. Examples are listed below.

- Denmark: German minority party of Schleswig Party
- Germany: Danish and Frisian minorities (in Schleswig-Holstein), Sorbian minority (in Brandenburg) in fact this only applies to the South Schleswig Voters' Association
- Italy (European Parliament): 50,000 votes for Aostan and South Tyrolean parties if they form an apparentment with a national-wide party. In fact this only applies to the South Tyrolean People's Party.
- Hungary: ~0.27% threshold instead of 5% (parties which do not meet the special threshold get a Nationality spokesman)
- Montenegro: 0.7% instead of 3% for Bosniak and Albanian minorities and a special 0.35% for the Croat minority (which is lower than the natural threshold)
- Poland: In elections to the Sejm, parties representing national minorities are exempt from the nationwide 5% threshold. In fact this only applies to the German minority
- Serbia: no threshold; parties below the usual 3% threshold get their vote cast increased by 35%

== Quotas inside party lists ==
- Iraq held its first post-Saddam parliamentary elections in January 2005 under an electoral law providing for compulsory integration of women on the candidates lists, like several European countries with a proportional electoral system.

== Manipulation ==
Komšić's 2010 election results by municipality expressed as a percentage of total valid votes for each municipality. Note that the Bosniak and Croat members of the Presidency are elected from the Federation of Bosnia and Herzegovina entity, while the Serb member is elected from the Republika Srpska entity (greyed out on the map).

In some cases, there is only one electoral roll allowing everyone to vote for reserved political positions even if they are not member of said community.

Since the introduction of the party-vote in 2000, the South Schleswig Voters' Association is in all Schleswig-Holstein (Germany) electable. The court ruled that the SSW is excepted from the threshold as long as the Danish & Frisian minorities remain dominant in the party and its program.

Croatia and Croat parties in Bosnia-Herzegovina accused Željko Komšić to owe his victories as the Croat Member of the Presidency to the votes of the much larger Bosniak community.

After the 2016 Croatian parliamentary election, two people were found guilty for paying voters to register as Hungarian and the turnout was higher by around 800 people. The Democratic Union of Hungarians of Croatia won with 2,731 votes (53%) in total.

In the 2021 Kosovan parliamentary election, the Romani Initiative and the United Community (Bosniak) were accused of having been backed by the Serb List and got many of their votes in Serb-majority communities.

Patriarch Louis Raphaël I Sako and other Christian politicians accused the Babylon Movement (which won 4 out of 5 seats in the 2021 Iraqi parliamentary election) of having a Shia Muslim voter base. Similarly, the independent Christian candidate Farouq Hanna Atto is said to owe his victory to the Kurdistan Democratic Party. According to estimations, the KDP transferred 125,000 votes and the Patriotic Union of Kurdistan 12,000 to win quota seats in the 2025 Iraqi parliamentary election.

The Russian Party, which won a mandate 2023 Serbian parliamentary election without crossing the threshold, openly stated that their members are "Russophiles, Serbs who have Russia in their hearts, as well as Russian descendants". The Green Party, which won a seat in 2016, was registered as a Slovak minority party because of the financial expenses for a usual party. In the 2022 election, League of Social Democrats of Vojvodina endorsed Together for Vojvodina (a Rusyn party) which also had LSV members on their list.

Team Fouad Ahidar became second largest Dutchophone party in the 2024 Brussels Parliament election. While its founder Fouad Ahidar himself is bilingual and the party targeted Muslim voters, he was already elected for the Dutchophone Vooruit before and could not switch his language groups effectively turning it into an advantage.

== See also ==
- Affirmative action
- Quotaism
- Tokenism
