= Mohammad Abu Sufian (Chittagong politician) =

Bangladeshi politician

- মোহাম্মদ আবু সুফিয়ান
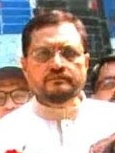
- Sufian in 2026

Member of the Bangladesh Parliament for Chittagong-9
- Incumbent
- Assumed office 17 February 2026
- Preceded by: Mohibul Hasan Chowdhury

Personal details
- Party: Bangladesh Nationalist Party

Mohammad Abu Sufian (Bengali: মোহাম্মদ আবু সুফিয়ান) is a Bangladeshi politician who, in February 2026, became the member of parliament for Chittagong-9. He is a member of the Bangladesh Nationalist Party (BNP), having gotten his start in politics with their student wing, the Jatiyatabadi Chhatra Dal (JCD).

He was the BNP's candidate for the seat of Chittagong-8 in 2018 and the January 2020 by-election.

== Biography ==
Sufian became involved with the Jatiyatabadi Chhatra Dal (JCD), the student wing of the Bangladesh Nationalist Party (BNP), in the early 1980s while at Chittagong College. In 1985, he was elected vice president of the Chittagong city unit of the JCD, and president in 1987.

He was the joint secretary of the metropolitan BNP in 1996. There were two main contenders for the BNP nomination for mayor in the 2005 Chattogram City Corporation election. Sufian backed Abdullah Al Noman, member of parliament for Chittagong-9. But the nomination went to Mir Mohammad Nasiruddin.

Sufian held various local party posts. In 2010, he was made senior vice president of the convening committee in the BNP's Chittagong city unit, a position he retained when a new committee was formed in 2016.

Meanwhile, from 2012 to 2015, he led anti-government protests. Some resulted in political violence and clashes with police, which led to him being arrested and charged a number of times.

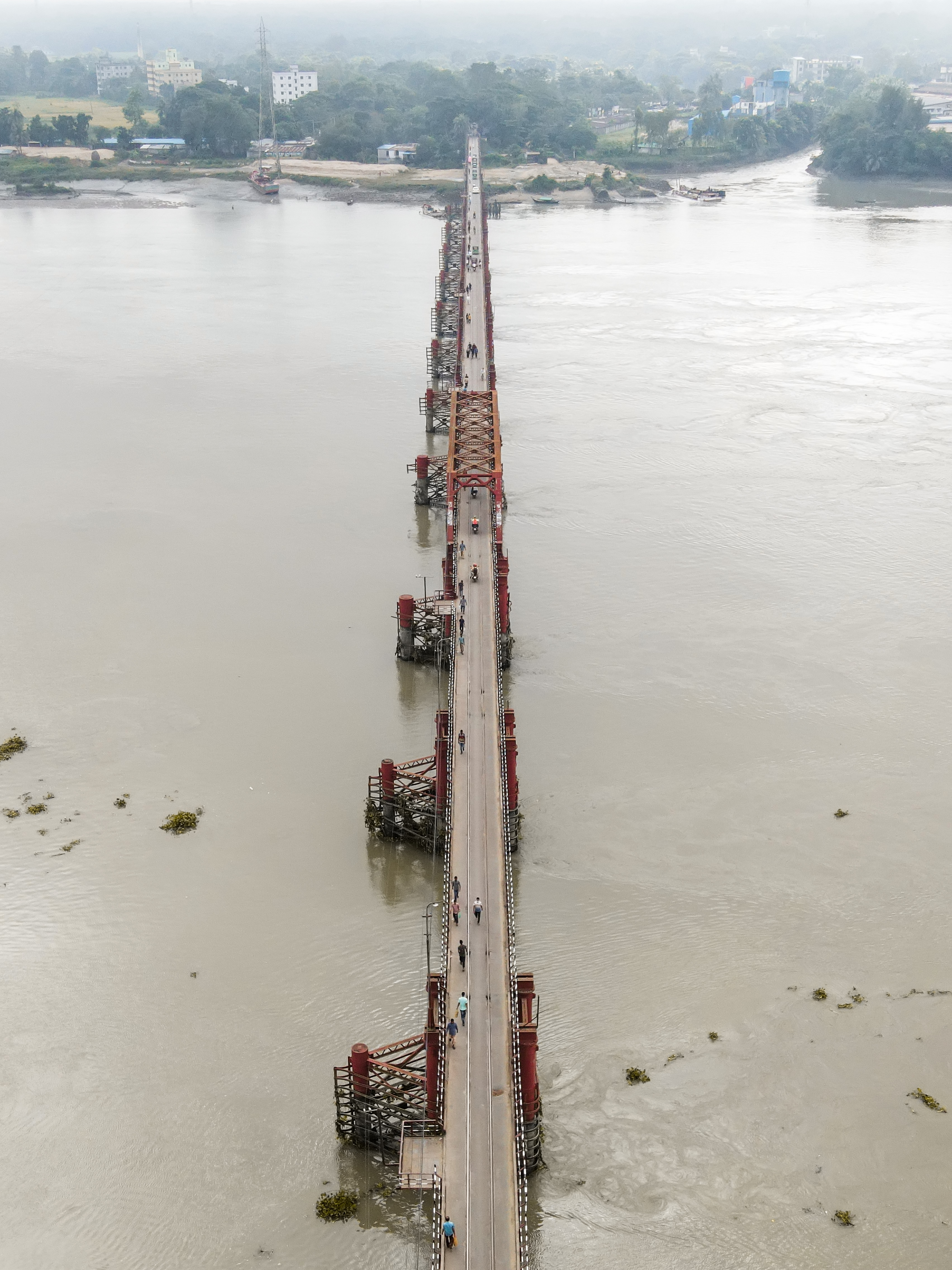
At peak times, it can take 3 hours to cross the narrow Kalurghat Bridge

=== National office ===
The BNP selected Sufian as their candidate for the Chittagong-8 constituency in the December 2018 general election. He promised, if elected, to make his first priority building a new bridge to relieve the congested Kalurghat Bridge. It can take 3 hours to cross the 1930 rail bridge over the Karnaphuli River that doubles as a one-lane vehicle bridge when trains are not using it. The other candidates also said they would build a new bridge, something candidates there have pledged for decades without results. Sufian finished second behind two-term incumbent Bangladesh Jatiya Samajtantrik Dal member of parliament Mayeen Uddin Khan Badal, receiving 60,428 votes, 17.2% of those cast.

Badal did not have to make good on his promise to resign after one year if he did not get the bridge built, because he died in office in November 2019. From a short list of three, the BNP selected Sufian over Ershad Ullah and Mostaque Ahmed Khan to stand in the resulting by-election, held in January 2020. He came second, behind Awami League candidate Moslem Uddin Ahmad, with 17,935 votes, 16.7% of those cast. Before polls even closed, Sufian called for a new election. He alleged that Awami League activists had prevented his supporters from casting their votes and had engaged in ballot stuffing.

Ahmad too died in office, in February 2023. The BNP did not contest the resulting April 2023 by-election. They boycotted the 2024 general election.

When the interim government of Muhammad Yunus called a general election for February 2026, Sufian sought the BNP nomination for Chittagong-8. The nomination instead went to Ershad Ullah, but the party high command asked Sufian to stand for Chittagong-9. He intended to finance his campaign entirely from personal savings and income.

Sufian said he would work with the city corporation and the Chittagong Development Authority to resolve waterlogging. He said his other priorities were improving civic services (such as housing, sanitation, education, and healthcare) and ensuring law and order. Sufian was elected with a majority of 55,581.
