= List of by-elections to the 11th Jatiya Sangsad =

11th Jatiya Sangsad by-elections
- 2019-2023

27 vacant seats (out of 300) in the Jatiya Sangsad

This is a list of by-elections to the 11th Jatiya Sangsad (Bangladesh Parliament);

== 2019 by-elections ==
Date	Constituency	MP before election	Party before election	Elected MP	Party after election
10 February 2019	Kishoreganj-1	Sayed Ashraful Islam	Awami League	Syeda Zakia Noor Lipi	Awami League
24 June 2019	Bogra-6	Mirza Fakhrul Islam Alamgir	Bangladesh Nationalist Party	Golam Mohammad Siraj	Bangladesh Nationalist Party
5 October 2019	Rangpur-3	Hussain Muhammad Ershad	Jatiya Party	Saad Ershad	Jatiya Party

== 2020 by-elections ==
Date	Constituency	MP before election	Party before election	Elected MP	Party after election	Ref.
10 January 2020	Chittagong-8	Moin Uddin Khan Badal	Awami League	Moslem Uddin Ahmad	Awami League	
21 March 2020	Gaibandha-3	Eunus Ali Sarkar	Awami League	Umme Kulsum Smrity	Awami League	
21 March 2020	Bagerhat-4	Mozammel Hossain	Awami League	Amirul Alam Milon	Awami League	
21 March 2020	Dhaka-10	Sheikh Fazle Noor Taposh	Awami League	Shafiul Islam Mohiuddin	Awami League	
14 July 2020	Bogra-1	Abdul Mannan	Awami League	Shahdara Mannan Shilpi	Awami League	
14 July 2020	Jessore-6	Ismat Ara Sadique	Awami League	Shahin Chakladar	Awami League	
26 September 2020	Pabna-4	Shamsur Rahman Sherif	Awami League	Nuruzzaman Biswas	Awami League	
17 October 2020	Naogaon-6	Israfil Alam	Awami League	Anwar Hossain Helal	Awami League	
17 October 2020	Dhaka-5	Habibur Rahman Mollah	Awami League	Kazi Monirul Islam Manu	Awami League	
12 November 2020	Sirajganj-1	Mohammed Nasim	Awami League	Tanvir Shakil Joy	Awami League	
12 November 2020	Dhaka-18	Sahara Khatun	Awami League	Mohammad Habib Hasan	Awami League	

== 2021 by-elections ==
Date	Constituency	MP before election	Party before election	Elected MP	Party after election
21 June 2021	Lakshmipur-2	Mohammad Shahid Islam	Independent politician	Nuruddin Chowdhury Noyon	Awami League
11 November 2021	Sirajganj-6	Hashibur Rahman Swapon	Awami League	Merina Jahan Kabita	Awami League

== 2022 by-elections ==
Date	Constituency	MP before election	Party before election	Elected MP	Party after election
16 January 2022	Tangail-7	Md. Akabbar Hossain	Awami League	Khan Ahmed Shuvo	Awami League
5 November 2022	Faridpur-2	Syeda Sajeda Chowdhury	Awami League	Shahdab Akbar Chowdhury	Awami League

== 2023 by-elections ==
Date	Constituency		MP before election	Party before election	Elected MP	Party after election	Ref.
4 January 2023	33.	Gaibandha-5	Fazle Rabbi Miah	Bangladesh Awami League	Mahmud Hasan Ripon	Bangladesh Awami League	
1 February 2023	5.	Thakurgaon-3	Jahidur Rahman	Bangladesh Nationalist Party	Hafiz Uddin Ahmed	Jatiya Party	
1 February 2023	39.	Bogra-4	Mosharraf Hossain	Bangladesh Nationalist Party	A. K. M. Rezaul Karim Tansen	Jatiya Samajtantrik Dal	
1 February 2023	41.	Bogra-6	Golam Mohammad Siraj	Bangladesh Nationalist Party	Ragebul Ahsan Ripu	Bangladesh Awami League	
1 February 2023	44.	Chapai Nawabganj-2	Md. Aminul Islam	Bangladesh Nationalist Party	Md. Ziaur Rahman	Bangladesh Awami League	
1 February 2023	45.	Chapai Nawabganj-3	Harunur Rashid	Bangladesh Nationalist Party	Md. Abdul Odud	Bangladesh Awami League	
1 February 2023	244.	Brahmanbaria-2	Abdus Sattar Bhuiyan	Bangladesh Nationalist Party	Abdus Sattar Bhuiyan	Independent politician	
6 March 2023 (Note: It was scheduled for 20 March, but Rina was declared to be elected unopposed on 6 March 2023)	350.	Reserved Women Seat-50	Rumeen Farhana	Bangladesh Nationalist Party	Afroza Haque Rina	Jatiya Samajtantrik Dal	
27 April 2023	285.	Chattogram-8	Moslem Uddin Ahmad	Bangladesh Awami League	Noman Al Mahmud	Bangladesh Awami League	
17 July 2023	190.	Dhaka-17	Akbar Hossain Pathan Farooque	Bangladesh Awami League	Mohammad A. Arafat	Bangladesh Awami League	
