= Sayeed Al Noman =

Bangladeshi politician

- সাঈদ আল নোমান
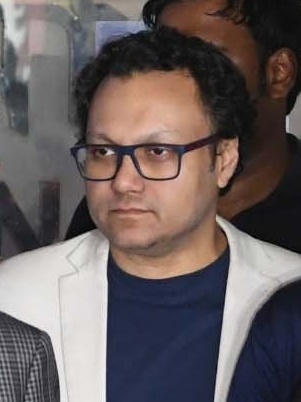
- Noman in February 2026

Member of the Bangladesh Parliament for Chittagong-10
- Incumbent
- Assumed office 17 February 2026
- Preceded by: Md. Mohiuddin Bacchu

Personal details
- Party: Bangladesh Nationalist Party
- Parent: Abdullah Al Noman (father)
- Education: University of Oxford (MPhil)
- Website: sayeednoman.com

Sayeed Al Noman (Bengali: সাঈদ আল নোমান) is a Bangladeshi politician who, in February 2026, became the member of parliament for Chittagong-10. He is a member of the Bangladesh Nationalist Party (BNP).

He is the son of BNP politician Abdullah Al Noman, who represented the same geographic area in parliament as Sayeed, although in his father's day it was called Chittagong-9. Father and son also founded East Delta University together.

== Biography ==
Sayeed Al Noman is the son of Abdullah Al Noman, who was elected to parliament in 1991. Sayeed has one sister. He studied abroad, earning his bachelor's degree at Central Michigan University. He followed that with a master's degree at the London School of Economics and Political Science and an MPhil at St Cross College, University of Oxford.

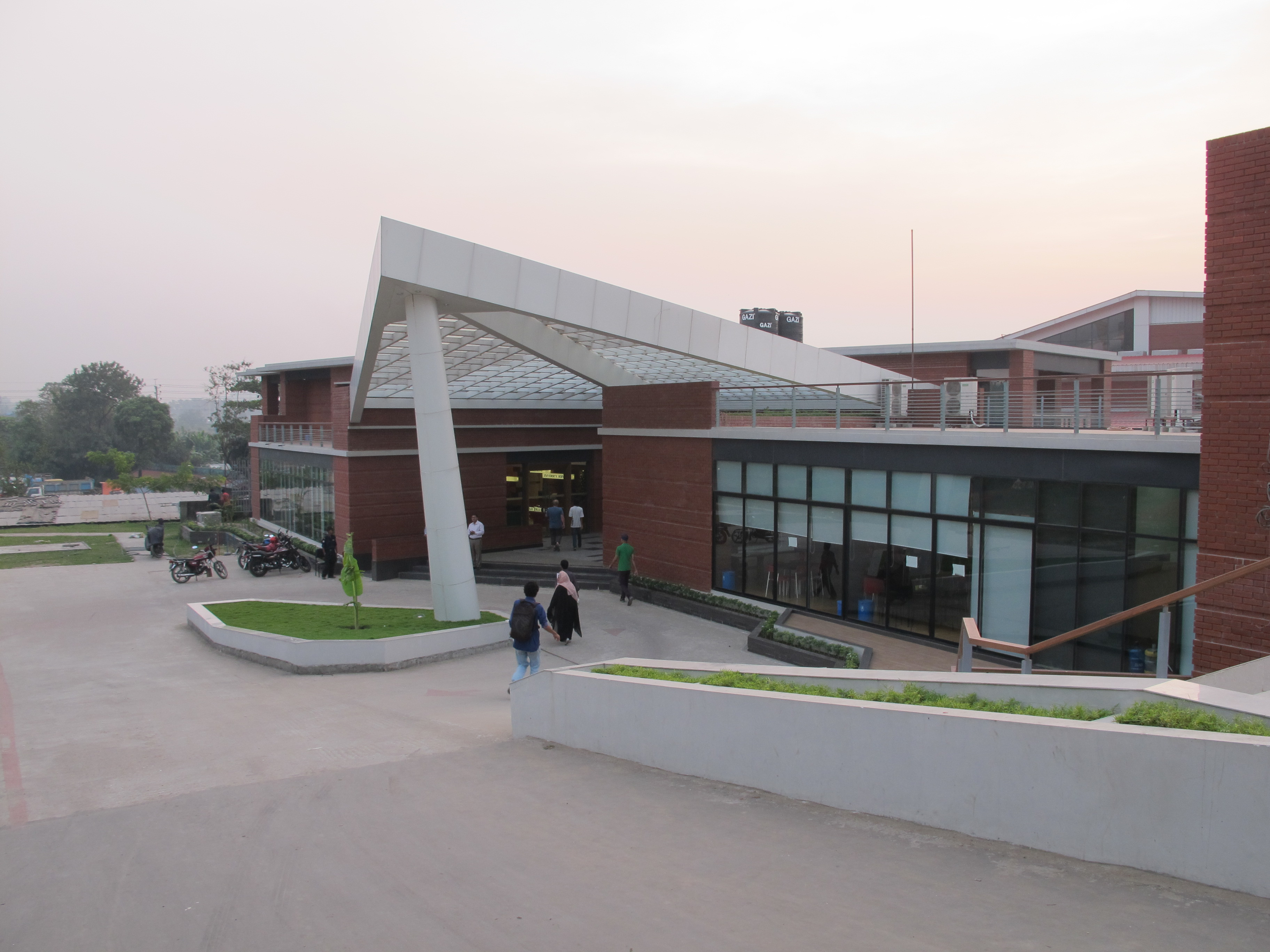
East Delta University, founded by Sayeed Al Noman and his father

In 2006, he and his father established in Chittagong the private East Delta University, where he is vice chairman of the board of trustees.

Noman is the president of the central committee of the Nationalist Jute Worker's Party. He became more active in politics after the July Uprising ousted the Awami League government in 2024. His father died on 25 February 2025.

When the interim government of Muhammad Yunus called a general election for February 2026, Noman lobbied for a seat. He sought the BNP nomination for Chittagong-6 or Chittagong-10. The former encompasses Raozan Upazila, where his father's roots were. The latter covers Double Mooring, Pahartali, and Khulshi Thanas as well as Halishahar Cantonment. It's the same geographic area that his father represented in parliament, but then it was called Chittagong-9. The nomination for Chittagong-10 initially went to Amir Khasru Mahmud Chowdhury, but in late December 2025, it was given to Noman, and Chowdhury was shifted to Chittagong-11.

Noman campaigned door-to-door, meeting voters in markets, tea stalls, and neighbourhoods. In his campaign, he emphasized his aim to make Chittagong a hub of technically skilled youth. His other priorities included job creation and modern civic services. Noman was elected with a majority of 46,059.

In June 2026, the speaker of parliament, Hafiz Uddin Ahmad, named Noman to the senate of the University of Chittagong. The 102-member group is the top policy-making body of the university.
