= Harun Aur Rashid Khan =

Bangladeshi politician

- হারুন অর রশীদ খাঁন

Member of Parliament for Chittagong-9
- In office 1988 – 6 December 1990
- Preceded by: Mohammad Sekander Hossain Miah
- Succeeded by: Abdullah Al Noman

Personal details
- Party: Jatiya Party

Harun Aur Rashid Khan is a politician from Chittagong District of Bangladesh. He was elected a member of parliament from Chittagong-9 in a 1988 by-election.

== Career ==
Harun Aur Rashid Khan was elected a member of parliament for constituency Chittagong-9 as a Jatiya Party candidate.
