= Chittagong-10 =

Constituency of Bangladesh's Jatiya Sangsad

Coordinates: 22.34°N 91.78°E

- Constituency for the Jatiya Sangsad
- District: Chittagong District
- Division: Chittagong Division
- Electorate: 492,444 (2026)

Current constituency
- Created: 1973
- Party: Bangladesh Nationalist Party
- Member: Sayeed Al Noman
- ← 286 Chittagong-9 288 Chittagong-11 →

Chittagong-10 is a constituency represented in the Jatiya Sangsad (National Parliament) of Bangladesh since 2026 by Sayeed Al Noman of the Bangladesh Nationalist Party.

== Boundaries ==
The constituency encompasses Chittagong City Corporation wards 8, 11, 12, 13, 14, 24, 25, 26.

== History ==
The constituency was created for the first general elections in newly independent Bangladesh, held in 1973.

Ahead of the 2008 general election, the Election Commission redrew constituency boundaries to reflect population changes revealed by the 2001 Bangladesh census.

Ahead of the 2014 general election, the Election Commission renumbered the seat for Sandwip Upazila from Chittagong-16 to Chittagong-3, bumping up by one the suffix of the former constituency of that name and the higher numbered constituencies in the district. Thus Chittagong-10 covers the area previously covered by Chittagong-9. Previously, Chittagong-10 encompassed Chittagong City Corporation wards 27 through 30 and 36 through 41.

== Members of Parliament ==
| Election | Member | Party |
|---|---|---|
| 1973 | Abul Kasem | Awami League |
| 1979 | Sirajul Islam | Bangladesh Nationalist Party |
| 1986 | Morshed Khan | Jatiya Party |
| 1988 | Begum Kamrun Nahar Jafar | Jatiya Party |
| 1991 | Sirajul Islam | Bangladesh Nationalist Party |
| Feb 1996 | Morshed Khan | Bangladesh Nationalist Party |
| Jun 1996 | Morshed Khan | Bangladesh Nationalist Party |
| 2001 | Morshed Khan | Bangladesh Nationalist Party |
Major Boundary Changes
| 2008 | M. Abdul Latif | Awami League |
Major Boundary Changes
| 2014 | Afsarul Amin | Awami League |
| 2018 | Afsarul Amin | Awami League |
| 2023 by-election | Md. Mohiuddin Bacchu | Awami League |
| 2024 | Md. Mohiuddin Bacchu | Awami League |
| 2026 | Sayeed Al Noman | Bangladesh Nationalist Party |

== Elections ==
=== Elections in the 2020s ===
General Election 2026: Chittagong-10
| Party | Candidate | Votes | % | ±% |
|---|---|---|---|---|
| BNP | Sayeed Al Noman | 122,978 | 58.8 | N/A |
| Jamaat | Muhammad Shamsuzzaman Helaly | 76,919 | 36.8 | N/A |
| IAB | Muhammad Jannatul Islam | 3,880 | 1.9 | N/A |
| Islamic Front | Md. Liaquat Ali | 2,441 | 1.2 | N/A |
| JP(E) | Muhammad Emdad Hossain Chowdhury | 1,079 | 0.5 | N/A |
| IBB | Sabina Khatun | 960 | 0.5 | N/A |
| Independent | Muhammad Arman Ali | 357 | 0.2 | N/A |
| BSD (Marxist) | Asma Akhtar | 305 | 0.1 | N/A |
| Labour | Md. Osman Ghani | 161 | 0.1 | N/A |
| Majority | | 46,059 | 22.0 | N/A |
| Turnout | | 209,080 | 42.5 | N/A |
| Registered electors | | 492,444 | | |
| BNP gain from AL | | | | |

=== Elections in the 2010s ===
General Election 2018: Chittagong-10
| Party | Candidate | Votes | % | ±% |
|---|---|---|---|---|
| AL | Muhammad Afsarul Ameen | 287,047 | 86.61 | +35.01 |
| BNP | Abdullah Al Noman | 41,390 | 12.49 | −32.01 |
| IAB | Muhammad Jannatul Islam | 2,974 | 0.90 | +0.10 |
| Majority | | 245,657 | 74.12 | +67.02 |
| Turnout | | 331,411 | 70.88 | +5.18 |
| Registered electors | | 469,314 | | |
| AL hold | | | | |

Muhammad Afsarul Ameen was elected unopposed in the 2014 general election after opposition parties withdrew their candidacies in a boycott of the election.

=== Elections in the 2000s ===
General Election 2008: Chittagong-10
| Party | Candidate | Votes | % | ±% |
|---|---|---|---|---|
| AL | M. Abdul Latif | 164,591 | 51.6 | +9.1 |
| BNP | Amir Khasru Mahmud Chowdhury | 141,946 | 44.5 | −8.4 |
| IAB | Md. Lokman | 2,628 | 0.8 | N/A |
| Independent | Jahinger Alam Chowdhury | 2,509 | 0.8 | N/A |
| Gano Forum | Md. Jane Alam | 1,853 | 0.6 | N/A |
| Bangladesh Kalyan Party | Md. Sahajada Alam | 1,756 | 0.6 | N/A |
| Independent | Moin Uddin Chowdhury | 1,421 | 0.4 | N/A |
| BSD | Md. Mohin Uddin | 1,280 | 0.4 | N/A |
| BDB | Ahmed Nobi Chowdhury | 572 | 0.2 | N/A |
| Independent | Md. Mostafa Kamal | 204 | 0.1 | N/A |
| Majority | | 22.645 | 7.1 | −3.2 |
| Turnout | | 318,760 | 65.7 | −1.5 |
| AL gain from BNP | | | | |

General Election 2001: Chittagong-10
| Party | Candidate | Votes | % | ±% |
|---|---|---|---|---|
| BNP | Morshed Khan | 112,308 | 52.9 | −6.1 |
| AL | S.M. Abul Kalam | 90,380 | 42.5 | −1.6 |
| BIF | Abul Kashem Noori | 4,210 | 2.0 | +1.0 |
| IJOF | Mohammad Aman Ullah | 2,633 | 1.2 | N/A |
| Independent | Nasir Uddin Bhuiya | 772 | 0.4 | N/A |
| Independent | Mohammad Hossain Chowdhury | 638 | 0.3 | N/A |
| Independent | Md. Jamal Uddin Khan | 634 | 0.3 | N/A |
| Independent | Ahammad Hossain | 473 | 0.2 | N/A |
| Liberal Party Bangladesh | Md. Azimul Haq | 184 | 0.1 | N/A |
| Jatiya Party (M) | Abul Kalam Azad | 133 | 0.1 | N/A |
| Independent | Syed Shamil Ahmed | 67 | 0.0 | N/A |
| Majority | | 21,928 | 10.3 | +7.7 |
| Turnout | | 212,432 | 67.2 | −6.5 |
| BNP hold | | | | |

=== Elections in the 1990s ===
General Election June 1996: Chittagong-10
| Party | Candidate | Votes | % | ±% |
|---|---|---|---|---|
| BNP | Morshed Khan | 81,714 | 46.8 | +0.5 |
| AL | Nurul Islam | 77,088 | 44.1 | +1.7 |
| JP(E) | Mohammad Alam | 6,493 | 3.7 | −1.3 |
| Jamaat | Sowkat Osman Chowdhury | 6,433 | 3.7 | N/A |
| BIF | Solaiman Farid | 1,752 | 1.0 | −1.3 |
| Zaker Party | Din Mohammad | 502 | 0.3 | +0.2 |
| IOJ | Md. Abdur Rahim Mollah | 401 | 0.2 | N/A |
| Gano Forum | Md. Nazrul Islam | 185 | 0.1 | N/A |
| Independent | Syed Shamim Ahmed | 108 | 0.1 | N/A |
| Majority | | 4,626 | 2.6 | −1.4 |
| Turnout | | 174,676 | 73.7 | +21.9 |
| BNP hold | | | | |

General Election 1991: Chittagong-10
| Party | Candidate | Votes | % | ±% |
|---|---|---|---|---|
| BNP | Sirajul Islam | 51,134 | 46.3 | |
| AL | Nurul Islam | 46,757 | 42.4 | |
| JP(E) | Haroon or Rashid | 5,558 | 5.0 | |
| BSD | Moin Uddin Khan | 2,776 | 2.5 | |
| BIF | Mahbub Alam | 2,488 | 2.3 | |
| NAP(B) | Chitta Ranjan Das Gupta | 772 | 0.7 | |
| FP | Nizamul Karim | 195 | 0.2 | |
| JSD | Nazrul Islam | 194 | 0.2 | |
| Independent | Probir Kumar Chowdhury | 130 | 0.1 | |
| Zaker Party | Kamal Uddin | 128 | 0.1 | |
| CPB | Monowar Ahmed | 89 | 0.1 | |
| BML | AM Abul Abbas Kaderi | 76 | 0.1 | |
| Independent | Abul Kalam Azad | 54 | 0.0 | |
| Majority | | 4,377 | 4.0 | |
| Turnout | | 110,351 | 51.8 | |
| BNP gain from | | | | |
