= S.M. Abul Kalam =

Bangladeshi politician

Ambassador of Bangladesh to Kuwait
- In office June 2016 – 13 July 2020
- Preceded by: Ashab Uddin
- Succeeded by: Muhammad Ashikuzzaman

Personal details
- Party: Awami League
- Education: University of Dhaka

S.M. Abul Kalam is a Bangladesh Awami League politician and a former ambassador of Bangladesh to Kuwait.

== Early life ==
Kalam graduated from University of Dhaka.

== Career ==
Kalam contested the 2001 parliamentary election as a candidate of Awami League from Chittagong-10. He lost the election to Bangladesh Nationalist Party candidate Morshed Khan.

Kalam was a member of Chittagong Development Authority. He served as the president of Chittagong Chamber of Commerce and Industry. He was a director of Argani Bank. He was as a member of Chittagong Stock Exchange. He is the vice-president of South Chittagong City Awami League. On 20 March 2016, he was appointed the ambassador of Bangladesh to Kuwait. On 19 April 2020, his contract of ambassadorship to Kuwait ended. The government extended his contract till 31 July 2020. He reported in May 2020 that due to the COVID-19 Pandemic, he expected that thousands of migrant Bangladeshi workers would be forced to leave Kuwait. In January 2019, the embassy was attacked and ransacked by migrant workers over unpaid wages according to Kalam.

Kalam defended and protected Mohammad Shahid Islam, Member of Parliament, in Kuwait. Shahid had been detained by the Criminal Investigation Department (Kuwait) on allegations of human trafficking. Kalam wrote a letter to Bangladesh Ministry of Foreign Affairs defending Shahid when he was being investigated. According to Bangladeshi journalists based in Kuwait he asked Kuwait to deport Bangladeshi journalists or blacklist them to prevent them from re-entering Kuwait. He had Jamuna TV correspondent, Ehsanul Haque Khokon, detained and deported from Kuwait after he reported on workers protests. AK Abdul Momen, Foreign Minister of Bangladesh, stated that Kalam had been unable to inform them on the arrest of Shahid. Despite being the ambassador of Bangladesh to Kuwait for almost 5 years he was unable to gather information on the detention and charges against Shahid.
