= Mahmudunnabi Chowdhury =

Bangladeshi businessman and politician (1908–1995)

- মাহমূদুন্নবী চৌধুরী

Minister for Relief and Rehabilitation, East Pakistan

Minister for Mass Communication, East Pakistan

Member of the East Pakistan Legislative Assembly
- In office 1954–1958
- Constituency: Double Mooring-Sitakunda

Personal details
- Born: 7 January 1908 North Kattali, Chittagong, Bengal Presidency
- Died: 6 August 1995 (aged 87) Chittagong, Bangladesh
- Party: Pakistan Democratic Party; Krishak Sramik Party
- Children: Amir Khasru Mahmud Chowdhury
- Education: Government Muslim High School
- Alma mater: Chittagong College
- Occupation: Politician, businessman

Mahmudunnabi Chowdhury (Bengali: মাহমুদুন্নবী চৌধুরী; 7 January 1908 – 6 August 1995) was a Bangladeshi politician, businessman, and former government minister. He was one of the founders of the Chittagong Chamber of Commerce. Chowdhury contested as a United Front candidate for the Double Mooring-Sitakunda constituency at the 1954 East Bengal Legislative Assembly election. After being elected as a member, he served as the Minister for Mass Communication, and then as the Minister for Relief and Rehabilitation.

== Early life and education ==
Chowdhury was born on 7 January 1908 to a Bengali family of Muslim Chowdhuries in the Nazir Bari of North Kattali, Pahartali, in the Chittagong District of the Bengal Presidency. He was the son of Khadem Ali Chowdhury and Begum Alfunnesa. Chowdhury completed his matriculation from the Government Muslim High School in 1930. He passed his ISC from Chittagong College in 1932 and received his Bachelor of Science degree from the same college in 1934.

== Career ==
Chowdhury began his career in the meteorological department in Calcutta in 1934. In 1936, he was employed as an accountant with the Maulana Company in Calcutta. He founded a clothing business named Chouwdhury and Brothers in 1937, located at Lower Chitpur Road, Calcutta. After the Partition of Bengal in 1947, he returned to Chittagong, where he founded a business in the Khatunganj neighbourhood in 1948. In 1951, he opened a business named Nahi and Sons in Dewanhat, Chittagong.

=== Political career ===
In 1949, Chowdhury was elected as the commissioner of Chittagong Municipality. Under the leadership of Sher-e-Bangla A. K. Fazlul Huq, he joined the Krishak Sramik Party in 1953. He contested as a United Front candidate for the Double Mooring-Sitakunda constituency at the 1954 East Bengal Legislative Assembly election. After being elected as a member, he served as the Minister for Mass Communication, and then as the Minister for Relief and Rehabilitation. During his tenure, the construction of dam projects in the coastal areas, and the introduction of test relief, and the establishment of the Film Development Corporation were established. He opposed the 1958 Pakistani military coup that installed President Ayub Khan. He was elected president of the Chittagong Chamber of Commerce and Industries in 1962. When the National Democratic Front was formed, he served as the provincial vice president and president of the Chittagong district branch in 1962.

Chowdhury was the president of the Pakistan Democratic Movement (PDM) Chittagong branch. He played an important role for the Democratic Action Committee (DAC) during the 1969 East Pakistan mass uprising. He contested for the Chittagong-II constituency within the National Assembly of Pakistan as a Pakistan Democratic Party candidate and was defeated in the 1970 Pakistani general election. He was a supporter of a politically united Pakistan. During the Bangladesh Liberation War, he was a Pradhan of the Chittagong District Peace Committee.

== Personal life ==
Chowdhury married Begum Meherunnesa Chowdhury. The president of the Chittagong City BNP politician Amir Khasru Mahmud Chowdhury is his son. His other sons include industrialist Abdur Razzaq Mahmud Chowdhury, Chittagong Chamber president and Thailand honorary consul Amir Humayun Mahmud Chowdhury, renowned personality Shahnawaz Mahmud Chowdhury, and the director of Meher Group, Shahzada Mahmud Chowdhury.

== Death ==
Chowdhury died of old age in Chittagong on 6 August 1995. The Mahmudunnabi Chowdhury Foundation has been formed on behalf of the family to keep his memory alive.
