= Arif Moinuddin =

Bangladeshi politician

Member of Bangladesh Parliament
- In office 1979–1982
- Preceded by: Kafiluddin
- Succeeded by: Mohammad Sekander Hossain Miah

Personal details
- Party: Bangladesh Nationalist Party, Bangladesh Nationalist Front

Arif Moinuddin is a Bangladeshi politician and a former member of parliament for Chittagong-9. His mother, Begum Tohfatunnessa Azim, was a reserved seat member of the East Pakistan Legislative Assembly representing the Awami League and later the founding President of Chattogram Mahila Awami League.

== Career ==
Moinuddin was elected to parliament from Chittagong-9 as a Bangladesh Nationalist Party candidate in 1979.
