= Sirajul Islam (Chittagong politician) =

Bangladeshi politician

Member of Parliament for Chittagong-10
- In office 1979–1982
- Preceded by: Abul Kasem
- Succeeded by: Morshed Khan
- In office 27 February 1991 – 15 February 1996
- Preceded by: Begum Kamrun Nahar Jafar
- Succeeded by: Morshed Khan

Personal details
- Born: Chittagong
- Died: 30 November 2003
- Party: Bangladesh Nationalist Party

Sirajul Islam (died 30 November 2003) was a Bangladeshi politician of Chittagong District who was the member of parliament for the Chittagong-10 constituency.

== Career ==
Islam was elected a member of parliament from the then Chittagong-10 constituency as a candidate of the Bangladesh Nationalist Party in the second parliamentary elections of 1989 and the fifth parliamentary elections of 1991.

== Death ==
Sirajul died on 30 November 2003.
