= Borhanuddin =

Borhanuddin may refer to:

- Borhanuddin (town), a town in Bhola District, Barisal, Bangladesh
- Borhanuddin Upazila, an upazila of Bhola District, Barisal, Bangladesh
- Borhanuddin (judge), Bangladesh Supreme Court judge
