= Mohammad Ishaq Miah =

Bangladeshi politician

Mohammad Ishaq

Member of Bangladesh Parliament
- In office 1986–1988
- Preceded by: Sultan Ahmed Chowdhury
- Succeeded by: Liaquat Ali

Personal details
- Died: 24 July 2017 Chittagong, Bangladesh
- Party: Jatiya Party (Ershad)

Mohammad Ishaq was a Bangladeshi Jatiya Party (Ershad) politician and member of parliament for Chittagong-8.

== Career ==
Ishaq was elected to parliament from Chittagong-8 as Awami league candidate in 1986. He died on 24 July 2017 in Chittagong.
