= Jatiya Samajtantrik Dal (disambiguation) =

Jatiya Samajtantrik Dal may refer to:

- Jatiya Samajtantrik Dal (JASAD)- Political party in Bangladesh.
- Jatiya Samajtantrik Dal-JSD- Bangladeshi political party.
- Jatiya Samajtantrik Dal (Siraj)- Bangladeshi political party.
- Bangladesh Jatiya Samajtantrik Dal- Bangladeshi political party
