= Md Mohiuddin Bacchu =

Bangladeshi politician (born 1967)

Md. Mohiuddin Bacchu
- মোঃ মহিউদ্দিন বাচ্চু

Member of Parliament
- In office 6 August 2023 – 6 August 2024
- Preceded by: Muhammad Afsarul Ameen
- Succeeded by: Sayeed Al Noman
- Constituency: Chittagong-10

Personal details
- Born: 8 January 1967 (age 59) Chittagong, East Pakistan, Pakistan
- Party: Bangladesh Awami League
- Occupation: Politician

Md Mohiuddin Bacchu (born 8 January 1967) is a Bangladesh Awami League politician and a former Jatiya Sangsad member representing the Chittagong-10 constituency during 2023–2024. He is a former convenor of Chattagram Metropolitan Jubo League.

== Career ==
Bacchu took his oath at Jatiya Sangsad Bhaban as a member of the parliament on 6 August 2023.

In February 2024, a Chittagong court issued an arrest warrant against Bachchu in a case filed by the Bangladesh Election Commission for breaching the electoral code of conduct. Bacchu allegedly distributed donation cheques to mosques, temples, and pagodas ahead of the 2024 Bangladeshi general election held in January.
