= Begum Kamrun Nahar Jafar =

Bangladeshi politician

Begum Quamrun Nahar Zafar

Member of Jatiya Sangsad
- In office 15 April 1988 – 6 December 1990
- Preceded by: Morshed Khan
- Succeeded by: Sirajul Islam
- Constituency: Chittagong-10
- In office 2 April 1979 – 6 December 1987
- Preceded by: Position created
- Constituency: Reserved Women's seat 29

Personal details
- Party: Jatiya Party (Ershad)

Begum Quamrun Nahar Zafar is a Jatiya Party (Ershad) politician and a former member of parliament for Chittagong-10.

== Career ==
Zafar was elected to parliament from Chittagong-10 as a Jatiya Party candidate in 1988. She served as a member of parliament from the reserved women's seat 29 in the second parliament in 1979 and in the third parliament in 1986.
