= Chittagong-8 =

Constituency of Bangladesh's Jatiya Sangsad

Coordinates: 22.38°N 91.86°E

- Constituency for the Jatiya Sangsad
- District: Chittagong District
- Division: Chittagong Division
- Electorate: 554,729 (2026)

Current constituency
- Created: 1973
- Party: Bangladesh Nationalist Party
- Member: Ershad Ullah
- ← 284 Chittagong-7 286 Chittagong-9 →

Chittagong-8 is a constituency represented in the Jatiya Sangsad (National Parliament) of Bangladesh since 2026 by Ershad Ullah of the Bangladesh Nationalist Party.

== Boundaries ==
The constituency encompasses Chittagong City Corporation wards 3 through 7, and all but one union parishad of Boalkhali Upazila: Sreepur Kharandwip.

== History ==
The constituency was created for the first general elections in newly independent Bangladesh, held in 1973.

Ahead of the 2008 general election, the Election Commission redrew constituency boundaries to reflect population changes revealed by the 2001 Bangladesh census. The 2008 redistricting altered the boundaries of the constituency.

Ahead of the 2014 general election, the Election Commission renumbered the seat for Chittagong-16 (Sandwip) to Chittagong-3, bumping up by one the suffix of the former constituency of that name and higher numbered constituencies in the district. Thus Chittagong-8 covers the area previously covered by Chittagong-7. Previously Chittagong-8 encompassed Chittagong City Corporation wards 15 through 23 and 31 through 35.

== Members of Parliament ==
Election	Member	Party
1973	Zahur Ahmed Chowdhury	Awami League
1979	Sultan Ahmed Chowdhury	Bangladesh Nationalist Party
1986	Mohammad Ishaq	Jatiya Party
1988	Liaquat Ali	Jatiya Party
Sep 1991 by-election	Amir Khasru Mahmud Chowdhury	Bangladesh Nationalist Party
Feb 1996	Amir Khasru Mahmud Chowdhury	Bangladesh Nationalist Party
Jun 1996	Amir Khasru Mahmud Chowdhury	Bangladesh Nationalist Party
2001	Amir Khasru Mahmud Chowdhury	Bangladesh Nationalist Party
Major Boundary Changes
2008	Nurul Islam	Awami League
Major Boundary Changes
2014	Mayeen Uddin Khan Badal	Jatiya Samajtantrik Dal
2018	Mayeen Uddin Khan Badal	Bangladesh Jatiya Samajtantrik Dal
Jan 2020 by-election	Moslem Uddin Ahmad	Awami League
2023 by-election	Noman Al Mahmud	Awami League
2024	Abdus Salam	Independent
2026	Ershad Ullah	Bangladesh Nationalist Party

== Elections ==
=== Elections in the 2020s ===
General Election 2026: Chittagong-8 (Note: The Business Standard lists a seventh candidate, H. M. M. Irfan of the Jatiya Party (Ershad), but that is likely a data entry error. He was a candidate for Comilla-8. No votes were tabulated for him in this constituency.)
Party	Candidate	Votes	%	±%
BNP	Ershad Ullah	152,969	60.1	N/A
Jamaat	Md. Abu Naser	53,564	21.0	N/A
BIF	Syed Muhammad Hassan	42,585	16.7	N/A
NCP	Jubairul Hasan Arif	3,349	1.3	N/A
IAB	Mohammad Nurul Alam	1,208	0.5	N/A
IBB	Mohammad Emdadul Haque	884	0.3	N/A
Majority		99,405	39.0	N/A
Turnout		254,559	45.9	N/A
Registered electors		554,729		
BNP gain from Independent				

=== Elections in the 2010s ===
General Election 2018: Chittagong-8
Party	Candidate	Votes	%	±%
BJSD	Mayeen Uddin Khan Badal			
BNP	Mohammad Abu Sufian			
IAB	Md. Farid Khan			
Majority				
Turnout				
BJSD gain from JSD				

Mayeen Uddin Khan Badal was elected unopposed in the 2014 general election after opposition parties withdrew their candidacies in a boycott of the election.

General Election 2008: Chittagong-8
Party	Candidate	Votes	%	±%
AL	Nurul Islam	140,411	55.6	+15.2
BNP	Shamsul Alam	109,484	43.4	−13.3
IAB	Mohammed Rafiqul Alam	685	0.3	N/A
BIF	Mohammad Nurul Islam Zehadi	680	0.3	−0.3
BSD	Md. Shafi Uddin Kabir	568	0.2	N/A
NDP	Tapan Chakrabarti	443	0.2	N/A
National People's Party	Anamul Hoque	115	0.0	N/A
Majority		30,927	12.3	−4.1
Turnout		252,386	79.8	+13.7
AL gain from BNP				

General Election 2001: Chittagong-8
Party	Candidate	Votes	%	±%
BNP	Amir Khasru Mahmud Chowdhury	181,584	56.7	+9.6
AL	Muhammad Afsarul Ameen	129,198	40.4	−2.6
IJOF	Md. Osman Khan	3,983	1.2	N/A
BIF	H. M. Mujibul Haq Shukkur	2,026	0.6	0.0
Liberal Party Bangladesh	Md. Shahidul Islam Chowdhury	988	0.3	N/A
Jatiya Party (M)	Md. Azad Dobhash	939	0.3	N/A
Gano Forum	Jane Alam	510	0.2	N/A
Independent	Abu Taiyab	231	0.1	0.0
Independent	Bajal Ahmmad	147	0.0	−0.1
BKA	Muhammad Abdur Razzak	145	0.0	N/A
Independent	A. B. M. Shahjahan Chowdhury	136	0.0	N/A
Independent	Md. Mahbubul Alam	85	0.0	N/A
Independent	Mofazzal Hossain Bhuiya	53	0.0	N/A
Independent	Md. Kamal Uddin	52	0.0	N/A
Majority		52,386	16.4	+12.3
Turnout		320,077	66.1	−4.3
BNP hold				

=== Elections in the 1990s ===
General Election June 1996: Chittagong-8
Party	Candidate	Votes	%	±%
BNP	Amir Khasru Mahmud Chowdhury	116,547	47.1	
AL	Muhammad Afsarul Ameen	106,341	43.0	
Jamaat	Md. Abu Taher	19,803	8.0	
BIF	H. M. Majibul Haque Shukkur	1,593	0.6	
IOJ	Jashim Uddin Faruki	1,451	0.6	
Independent	Jane Alam	688	0.3	
Independent	Abu Taiyab	367	0.1	
Zaker Party	Muhammad Azizur Rahman	244	0.1	
Independent	Bajal Ahmmad	235	0.1	
NAP(B)	A. K. M. Golam Kabir	108	0.0	
Majority		10,206	4.1	
Turnout		247,377	70.4	
BNP hold				

Khaleda Zia stood for five seats in the 1991 general election: Bogra-7, Dhaka-5, Dhaka-9, Feni-1, and Chittagong-8. After winning all five, she chose to represent Feni-1 and quit the other four, triggering by-elections in them. Amir Khasru Mahmud Chowdhury of the BNP was elected in a September 1991 by-election.

General Election 1991: Chittagong-8
Party	Candidate	Votes	%	±%
BNP	Khaleda Zia	69,422	52.1	
AL	Ishak Miah	44,154	33.2	
Jamaat	Md. Abu Taher	13,466	10.1	
JP(E)	Liaqat	3,141	2.4	
JSD	Nuruddin Zahed	1,388	1.0	
IOJ	Jasim Uddin Faruki	765	0.6	
Zaker Party	Salim Ullah	251	0.2	
Independent	Siddqul Islam	215	0.2	
BSD	Md. Yusuf Ali	139	0.1	
NAP(B)	A. K. M. Golam Kabir	137	0.1	
FP	Nizamul Amin	70	0.1	
Majority		25,268	19.0	
Turnout		133,148	56.0	
BNP gain from JP(E)				
