= Mahmudul Hoque (judge) =

Bangladeshi judge

Justice of the High Court Division of Bangladesh
- Incumbent
- Assumed office 26 September 1984

Personal details
- Born: December 13, 1958 (age 67)
- Education: University of Chittagong
- Profession: Judge

Mahmudul Hoque is a justice of the High Court Division of the Bangladesh Supreme Court.

== Early life ==
Mahmudul Hoque was born on 13 December 1958. He has a bachelor's of law and master's of art from the University of Chittagong.

== Career ==
Mahmudul Hoque became a lawyer in the District Courts on 26 September 1984 and in the High Court Division on 8 January 1987.

On 14 June 2012, Mahmudul Hoque was appointed an additional judge of the High Court Division. In September, Mahmudul Hoque and Justice Rezaul Hasan dismissed a corruption case against Obaidul Karim, chairman of Orion Group, in which he was accused of brbing former prime minister Khaleda Zia to receive the contract for the Gulistan-Jatrabari flyover.

In March 2013, Mahmudul Hoque and Justice AHM Shamsuddin Choudhury Manik refused the bail application of the chairman of Hall-Mark Group in 11 corruption cases. The court also ordered the arrest of officials of Hall-Mark Group and Sonali Bank involved in the scam. Mahmudul Hoque and Justice AHM Shamsuddin Choudhury Manik ordered police to detain Bangladesh Jamaat-e-Islami activists who forcefully converted Awami League activists after accusing them of being "Jewish" for supporting the Awami League. The Awami League activists were abducted by Bangladesh Jamaat-e-Islami activists in Dinajpur District and forcefully made to pledge loyalty to Bangladesh Jamaat-e-Islami through a conversion to Islam in a mosque. Mahmudul Hoque and Justice AHM Shamsuddin Choudhury Manik ordered the government to protect religious minorities from targeted attacks by activists of Bangladesh Nationalist Party and Bangladesh Jamaat-e-Islami. The court also ordered the arrest of those involved in the attack on Hindu homes and temples in Banshkhali Upazila.

Mahmudul Hoque was made a permanent judge of the High Court Division in June 2014 by President Abdul Hamid along with four other judges. The government choose not to make Justice ABM Altaf Hossain, who became a judge at the same time, permanent.

In March 2016, Mahmudul Hoque and Justice Md Ruhul Quddus rejected four petitions against the corruption case against the vice-chairman of the Bangladesh Nationalist Party, Tarique Rahman, clearing the way for the case to proceed. Tarique Rahman was accused of taking a bribe relating to the 2006 death of Humayun Kabir Sabbir, director of the Bashundhara Group, to protect the accused.

In April 2017, Mahmudul Hoque and Justice Farah Mahbub rejected a petition to halt the Cadet Pollen murder case from the five accused.
