= Borhanuddin (judge) =

Bangladeshi Judge

Justice of the High Court Division of Bangladesh
- Incumbent
- Assumed office 3 March 1985

Personal details
- Born: February 28, 1957 (age 69)
- Education: University of Chittagong
- Profession: Judge

Borhanuddin is a judge in the Appellate Division of the Bangladesh Supreme Court.

== Early life ==
Borhanuddin was born on 28 February 1957. He completed his law degree from the University of Chittagong.

== Career ==
Borhanuddin started working as a lawyer of the district courts on 3 March 1985.

On 16 June 1988, Borhanuddin became a lawyer in the High Court Division.

On 27 November 2002, Borhanuddin became a lawyer in the Supreme Court of Bangladesh.

Borhanuddin was made an additional judge of the High Court Division on 16 November 2008 and became a permanent judge on 11 November 2010.

On 18 July 2012, Borhanuddin and Justice Mahmudul Hoque dismissed corruption charges against ABM Mohiuddin Chowdhury, former Awami League mayor of Chittagong.

Borhanuddin and Justice K. M. Kamrul Kader granted bail to Abul Asad, editor of The Daily Sangram, on 17 April 2013 on charges of illegally printing Amar Desh. In November 2013, Borhanuddin and Justice KM Kamrul Kader, placed five senior leaders of the Bangladesh Nationalist Party in police custody. On 23 April 2014, Borhanuddin and Justice K. M. Kamrul Kader rejected a petition filed by former prime minister Khaleda Zia challenging her appeal against her indictment in the Zia Charitable Trust corruption case.

Borhanuddin and Justice Mostafizur Rahman refused to hear a petition filed by Amir Khasru Mahmud Chowdhury, Bangladesh Nationalist Party politician, challenging summons issued by the Anti-Corruption Commission.

On 9 January 2022, Borhanuddin was promoted to the Appellate Division of the Bangladesh Supreme Court.
