= Mohibul Hassan Chowdhoury =

Bangladeshi politician

- মহিবুল হাসান চৌধুরী
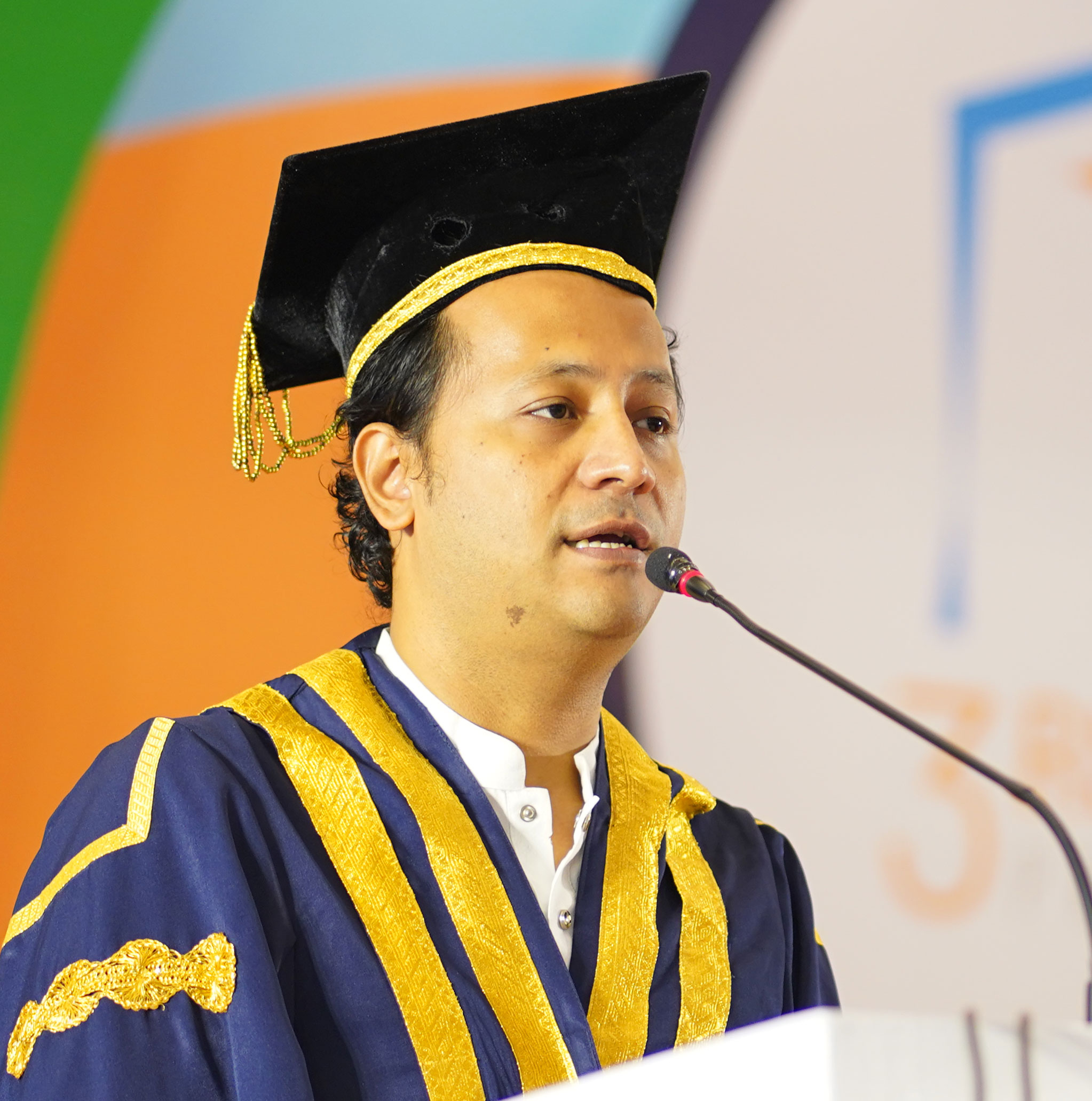
- Nowfel in 2023

Minister of Education
- In office 11 January 2024 – 6 August 2024
- Prime Minister: Sheikh Hasina
- Preceded by: Dipu Moni
- Succeeded by: Wahiduddin Mahmud

Member of Parliament
- In office 3 January 2019 – 6 August 2024
- Preceded by: Ziauddin Ahmed Bablu
- Succeeded by: Mohammad Abu Sufian
- Constituency: Chittagong-9

Deputy Minister of Education
- In office 7 January 2019 – 10 January 2024
- Prime Minister: Sheikh Hasina

Personal details
- Born: 26 July 1983 (age 43) Chattogram, Bangladesh
- Party: Bangladesh Awami League
- Spouse: Emma Claire Burton
- Parents: A. B. M. Mohiuddin Chowdhury (father); Shaheda Mohiuddin (mother)
- Education: London School of Economics; University of Law
- Nickname: Nowfel

Mohibul Hassan Chowdhoury, commonly known as Nowfel Chowdhoury, (born July 26, 1983) is a politician affiliated with Bangladesh Awami League and a former Member of the Jatiya Sangsad from the constituency of Chittagong-9. He first served as Deputy Minister and was later appointed as the Minister of Education in the Fourth and Fifth Hasina Cabinets, respectively. Following the fall of Sheikh Hasina he left Bangladesh and has since been living in exile in India. He is the eldest son of A.B.M. Mohiuddin Chowdhoury, former mayor of Chattogram City Corporation.

He has been accused by interim government led by Muhammad Yunus of involvement in the July massacre during the 2024 Student-People's uprising, and later International Crimes Tribunal, Bangladesh issued an arrest warrant against him.

== Early life and education ==
Chowdhoury was born on 26 July 1983 into the family of former Chattogram City Corporation Mayor A.B.M. Mohiuddin Chowdhoury and Shaheda Mohiuddin. He completed his schooling in Bangladesh before pursuing higher education abroad, earning a joint bachelor's degree in Law and Anthropology from the London School of Economics (LSE) and completing the Bar Vocational Course at the University of Law. Mohibul was enrolled at the University of Bath as a Professional Doctorate candidate in 2023.

He was a member of Awami League's Chittagong City executive committee from 2012 to 2016 and was later promoted as an organising secretary of Awami League Central Executive Committee.

== Career ==
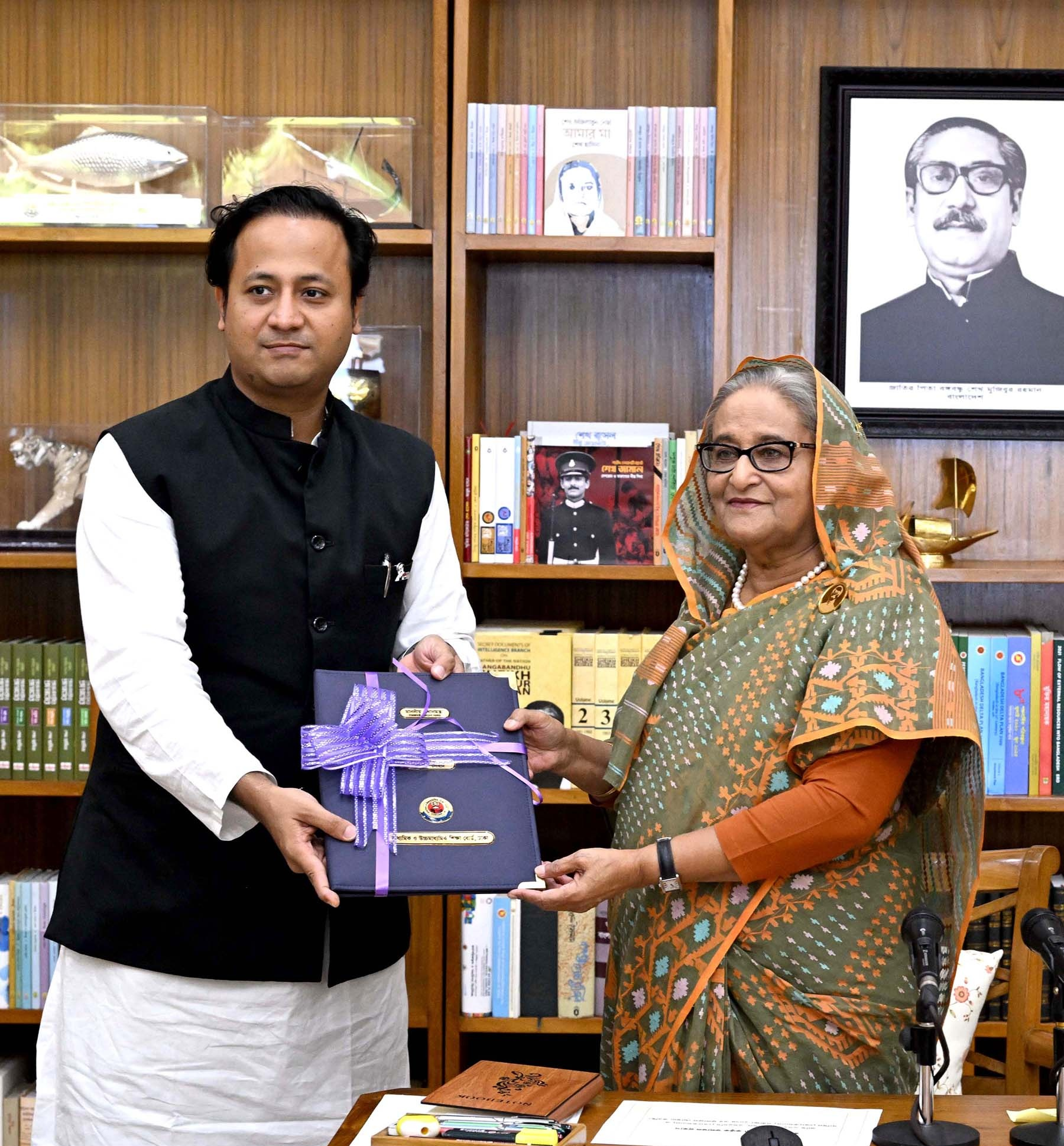
Chowdhoury, as the Minister of Education, submitting the statistics report of the Secondary School Certificate examination result to Prime Minister Sheikh Hasina in May 2024

Chowdhoury was elected to the Jatiya Sangsad in 2018 general election from Chittagong-9 as a Bangladesh Awami League candidate. He was appointed as the deputy minister of education in the 4th cabinet of Sheikh Hasina. From 2016 to 2019, Chowdhoury held the position of Organising Secretary of the Awami League's Central Committee. During his tenure in the secretarial body, he helped win the Narayanganj City Corporation election in 2016 which was the first city election with direct political party nomination in Bangladesh. He was one of the youngest organising secretaries of Awami League and was credited for managing the party in important districts such as Gazipur, Faridpur, Kishoreganj, Shariatpur, Gopalganj, etc. which districts are considered Awami League heartlands. On 25 June 2018, he apologized to Bangladesh Election Commission for violating electoral code of conduct by participating in election campaign in Gazipur City Corporation as an outsider.

Prior to his appointment to the Cabinet, he spent nine years practicing law as a member of both the Bangladesh Supreme Court Bar and the Dhaka Bar Association. On 27 December 2019, he was removed from central executive committee of Awami League as part of the party's strategy to separate the government from the party.

== Policy initiatives ==
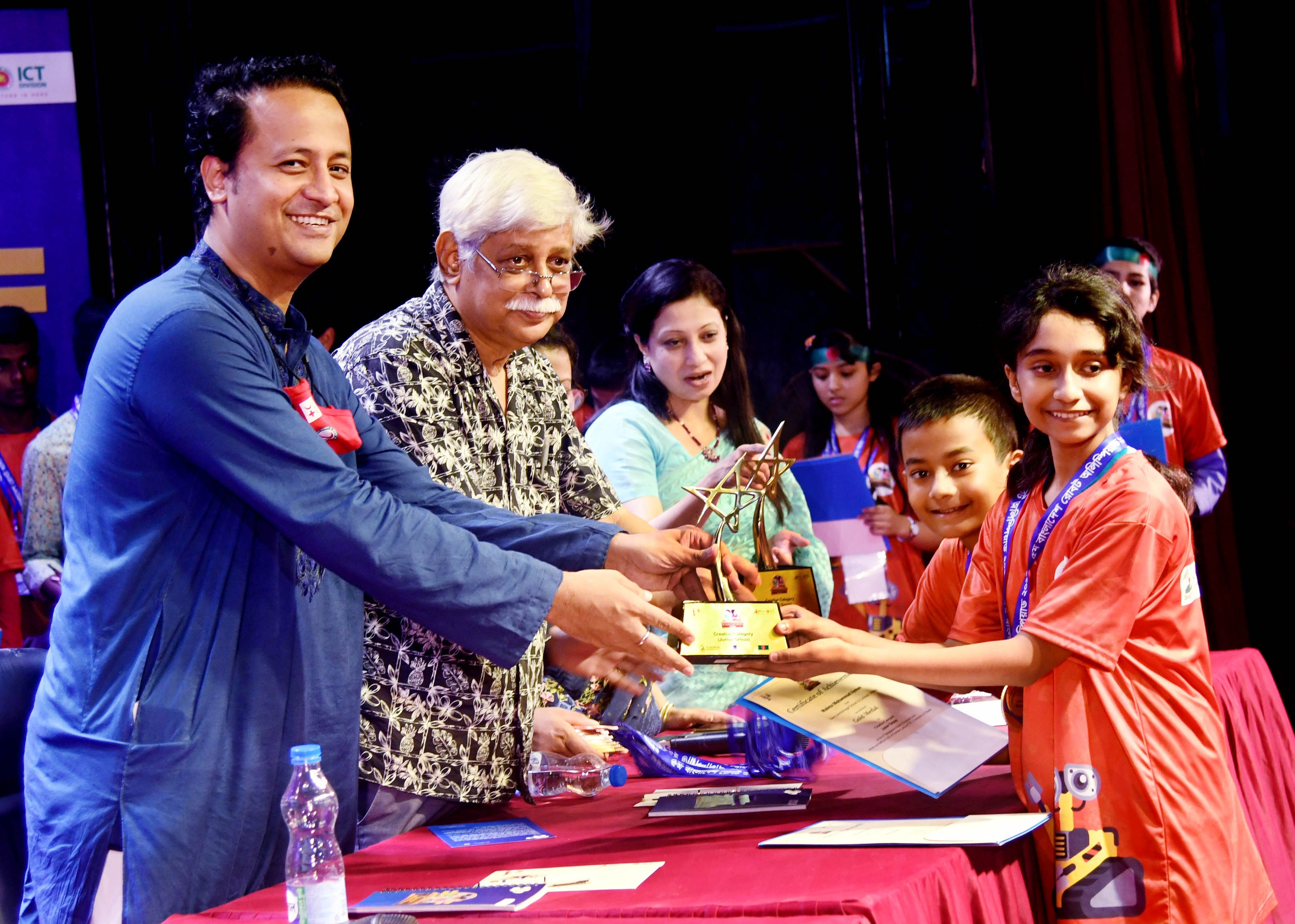
Chowdhoury, along with Muhammad Zafar Iqbal, distributes prizes at the Bangladesh Robotics Olympiad 2022.

On 9 April 2021, Chowdhoury said that the Bangladesh government might reconsider and cancel recognition of the highest degree from the Qwami Madrassa Board if the teaching of extreme religious interpretation is not regulated and basic academic standards are not met.

At the UNESCO World Conference on Culture and Arts Education held in Abu Dhabi in February 2024, Mohibul Hasan Chowdhoury, Bangladesh’s Minister of Education, highlighted the role of technology in advancing education sector, and the importance of data sovereignty, arguing that governments must have access to data generated by their citizens to design effective education policies and leverage artificial intelligence for addressing learning gaps. Chowdhoury also called for stronger collaboration between governments and global technology companies to ensure responsible use of AI, warning that without such cooperation, digital transformation could reinforce existing inequalities and cultural imbalances.

The Ministry of Education in Bangladesh was in the process of rolling out a TVET and STEAM based school curriculum to achieve the newly promoted political and economic objective of "Smart Bangladesh". Regarding the new curriculum, when he was Deputy Minister of Education, he stated that there is a need to promote reading habits, implement continuous assessment methods, and integrate essential soft skills and vocational education skills. Therefore, conventional memory-based, public exam-based assessments should be discarded, and new curriculum should be implemented.

One of the controversy in the proposed new curriculum was inclusion of third gender rights, reproductive health and mandatory science and maths education for all up to the age of 16. Staunchly secularist Mohibul defended inclusion of contents promoting rights of third gender and transgender people in textbooks after facing intense criticism from religious and political groups. After protests about the inclusion of transgender Sharif's story in textbooks, Mohibul emphasised the importance of acknowledging legally recognised third gender community in society and ensuring that students are aware of this aspect of society. He had commented that this is just a rights issue of a gender minority but the conservative elements are trying to politicise the matter.

Conservative religious leaders and pro Islamist academics have joined to remove educational contents seen as un-Islamic and demanded release of university teacher Asif Mahtab who protested inclusion of third gender/transgender contents in textbooks. Religious and right wing political parties along with some academics have demanded revision of the new curriculam as Bangladesh is a predominantly Muslim country. The new Education Advisor Wahiduddin Mahmud of the 2024 interim government of Bangladesh, following ouster of Mohibul as Education Minister and the entire government of Sheikh Hasina, have decided to scrap the new curriculum in favour of the old curriculum of 2012.

== Controversies ==
=== Quota reform protest and student politics ===
Following clashes between quota reform protesters and activists of the Bangladesh Chhatra League at the University of Dhaka on 15 July 2024, Chowdhoury faced criticism for failing to maintain a peaceful campus environment, and ensure the safety of students. During the July–August protests, he ordered the closure of schools, colleges, universities, and residential halls nationwide, stating that the measure was intended to reduce tensions and prevent further clashes.

Chowdhoury has been implicated in a murder case related to the death of a college student, Tanvir Siddiqui, during quota reform protests in Chittagong. The case, filed by the victim's uncle, accuses Chowdhoury, along with former Prime Minister Sheikh Hasina and 32 others, of orchestrating an attack on peaceful protesters on 18 July 2024. During the protest, unidentified assailants allegedly attacked students with firearms and other weapons, resulting in Tanvir being shot and later dying in the hospital.

Mohibul has repeatedly distanced himself from any criminal or violent acts carried out in his or his late father's name and has warned that those involved in such activities will face academic and legal consequences.

In February 2023, four Chittagong Medical College students were allegedly assaulted by a group led by Chhatra League activist Avijit Das, with some reports alleging links to Mohibul. Mohibul later condemned criminal activities carried out in his or his party's name and called for an impartial investigation into the incident.

=== Allegation of involvement in a counterfeit cigarette business ===
Following the fall of the Hasina government, when Mohibul Hasan Chowdhoury had gone into exile and was unable to respond to. allegations, The Daily Star published a report citing a National Board of Revenue (NBR) investigation. The report alleged that Chowdhoury had profited from a tobacco business that may have embezzled funds from Premier University and produced illegal or counterfeit tobacco products worth crores of taka. On August 20, 2024, the Bangladesh Financial Intelligence Unit (BFIU) ordered the freezing of bank accounts belonging to Chowdhoury and his family members. The Anti-Corruption Commission (ACC) later alleged that it had found evidence of more than Tk 211.20 crore in suspicious transactions across multiple bank accounts linked to him, indicating that he had accumulated significant wealth beyond his known sources of income. On January 20, 2025, a Dhaka court ordered the seizure of his tax records following a petition filed by the Anti-Corruption Commission.

=== Premier University takeover ===
Premier University, established between 2001 and 2002 by the Chattogram City Corporation (CCC), was funded and developed by the corporation, including land acquisition and operational support. Over time, allegations emerged that former mayor ABM Mohiuddin Chowdhoury and later his family, including his son Mohibul Hasan Chowdhoury, assumed control of the university exercising political influence and through a trustee board largely composed of family members and acquaintances, including money launderer S. Alam. CCC challenged this control in court; however, in 2017 the High Court ruled in favour of the family, and the University Grants Commission (UGC) did not file an appeal, allowing the arrangement to continue. During Mohibul Hasan Chowdhoury's tenure as deputy education minister, his influence over the institution reportedly increased. Following the fall of the Awami League government, Chowdhoury went into exile in India and CCC renewed its claim over the university. With new leadership in both CCC and UGC, legal steps were taken to challenge the earlier verdict, and on 24 December 2024, the Appellate Division's Chamber Judge stayed the previous legal position, effectively restoring CCC's authority over the university.
