= Abdus Salam (Chittagong politician) =

Bangladeshi politician

- আবদুচ ছালাম
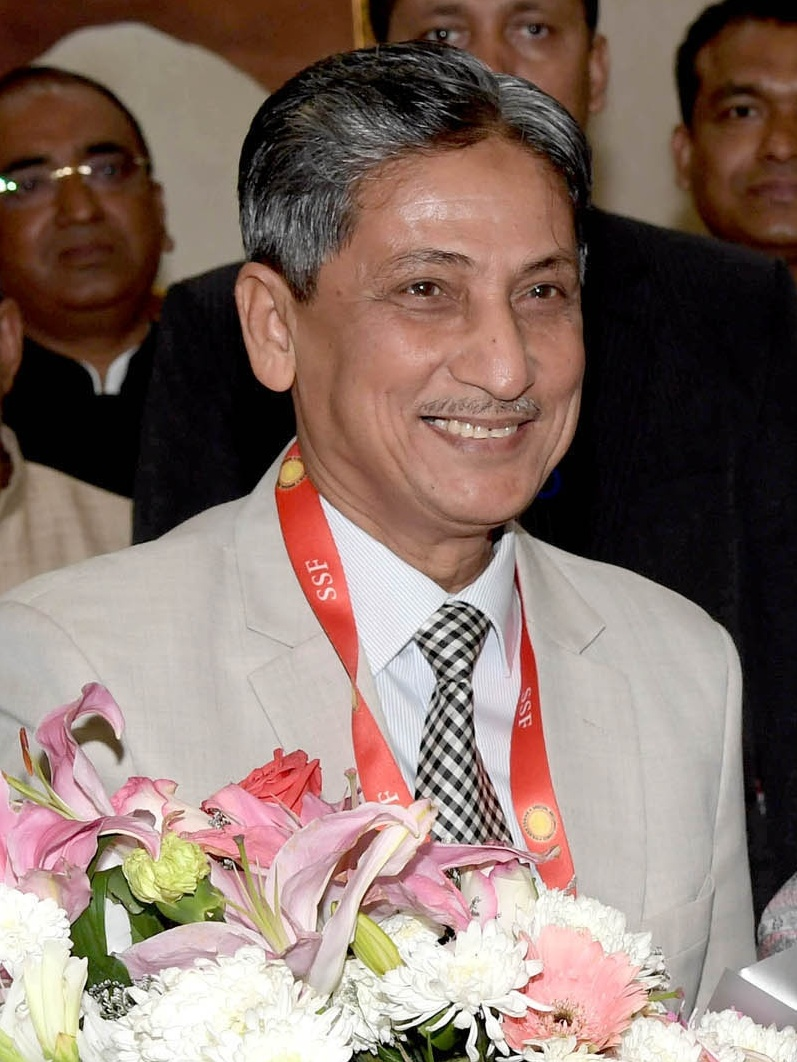
- Salam in 2019

Member of Parliament
- In office 30 January 2024 – 6 August 2024
- Preceded by: Noman Al Mahmud
- Succeeded by: Ershad Ullah
- Constituency: Chittagong-8

Chairman of Chittagong Development Authority
- In office 28 March 2009 – 22 March 2019
- Preceded by: Shah Muhammad Akhtar Uddin
- Succeeded by: M. Zahirul Alam dubash

Personal details
- Born: 9 September 1951 (age 75) Chittagong, East Bengal, Dominion of Pakistan
- Party: Bangladesh Awami League
- Education: Government City College; Chittagong University
- Occupation: Politician

Abdus Salam (Bengali: আবদুচ ছালাম) is a Bangladeshi politician and a former chairman of the Chittagong Development Authority. He briefly served as member of Jatiya Sangsad from Chittagong-8 as an independent candidate on the 2024 Bangladeshi general election.

Although he contested the election as an independent candidate, at the time he was the treasurer of the Chittagong division Awami League. He is also the founder of the Well Group.
