= Kafiluddin =

Bangladeshi politician

Member of Bangladesh Parliament
- In office 1973–1979
- Succeeded by: Arif Moinuddin

Personal details
- Died: Chittagong
- Party: Bangladesh Awami League

Kafiluddin is a Bangladesh Awami League politician and a former member of parliament for Chittagong-9.He had four sons, one of them is Dr.Hasan Murad a renowned cardiologist in Chittagong and his son MD. Elham Hameem.

== Career ==
Kafiluddin was elected to parliament from Chittagong-9 as a Bangladesh Awami League candidate in 1973.
