= Nurul Islam (minister) =

Bangladeshi politician

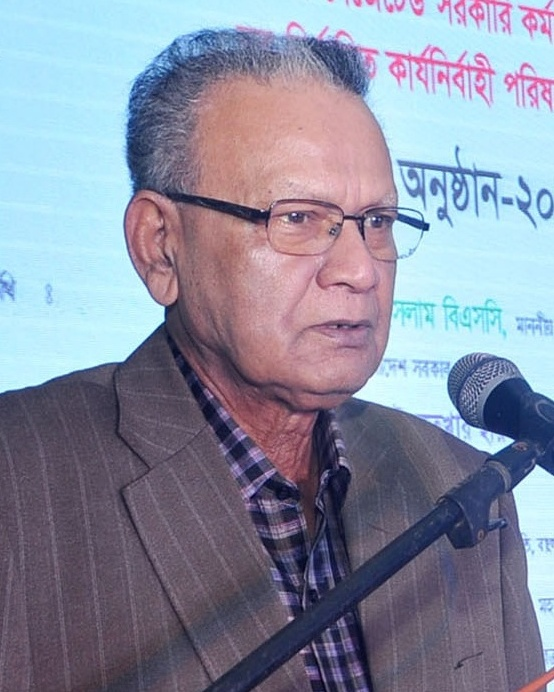
- Nurul Islam in 2015

Minister of Expatriates' Welfare and Overseas Employment
- In office 14 July 2015 – 7 November 2018
- Succeeded by: Imran Ahmad

Member of Parliament
- In office 29 December 2008 – 2014
- Preceded by: Amir Khasru Mahmud Chowdhury
- Succeeded by: Moin Uddin Khan Badal
- Constituency: Chittagong-8

Personal details
- Born: 3 January 1938 (age 88) Chandgaon, Chittagong, Bengal Presidency, British India
- Party: Bangladesh Awami League

Nurul Islam (known as Nurul Islam BSc; born 3 January 1938) is a Bangladesh Awami League politician who served as the minister of expatriates' welfare and overseas employment.

== Early life ==
Islam was born in Chandgaon, Chittagong District. He graduated from the Chandgaon NMC Adarsha High School and the Chittagong College.

== Career ==
Islam has written 32 books. He has established 27 educational institutions in Chittagong. He fought in the Bangladesh Liberation war and defended Shadhin Bangla Betar Kendra at Kalurghat. He was elected to parliament from Chittagong-8 on 29 December 2008. He was appointed as the minister of expatriates' welfare and overseas employment on 14 July 2015. Islam founded Sanowara Group in 1976 and served as the chairman until being succeeded by his first and third sons Mujibur Rahman and Zahedul Islam. The group operates 15 industries including poultry and hatchery, garments, toiletries, ice-cream, butter-oil, condensed milk, mineral water, tea, repacked powdered milk and plastic.

== Personal life ==
Islam is married to Sanowara Begum. Together they have 5 sons and 2 daughters.
