= Muhammad Ashikuzzaman =

Retired Major General of Bangladesh Army

- Born: 17 November 1967 (age 58); Rajshahi, East Pakistan, Pakistan
- Military career
- Allegiance: Bangladesh
- Branch: Bangladesh Army
- Service years: 1988-2023
- Rank: Major General
- Unit: Regiment of Artillery
- Commands: Senior Directing Staff (Army-2) of National Defence College; Commander of 19th Artillery Brigade; Commander of 33rd Artillery Brigade; Station Commander, Bogra; Director of Special Security Force
- Conflicts: UNAMSIL; UNOCI; MONUSCO

Muhammad Ashikuzzaman is a major general of the Bangladesh Army and a diplomat who served as the ambassador of Bangladesh to Kuwait and Yemen.

== Early life ==
Ashikuzzaman has a masters in Defence Studies and another in strategic studies from the National University, Bangladesh.

== Career ==
Ashikuzzaman joined Bangladesh Army as a commissioned officer in 1988.

Ashikuzzaman served at the United Nations Mission in Sierra Leone, United Nations Operation in Côte d'Ivoire, and MONUSCO. He worked at the National Defence College as the senior directing staff.

On 13 July 2020, Ashikuzzaman was appointed the ambassador of Bangladesh to Kuwait. He replaced S.M. Abul Kalam, who had faced criticism for links to Mohammad Shahid Islam.
