= M. A. Manan =

Bangladeshi politician

- এম এ মান্নান

Member of Parliament for Chittagong-7
- In office 1973–1975
- Preceded by: Abdullah Al Noman
- Succeeded by: Abdullah Al Noman

Member of Parliament for Chittagong-9
- In office 12 June 1996 – 1 October 2001
- Succeeded by: Salahuddin Quader Chowdhury

Personal details
- Born: c. 1936 Chittagong
- Died: 21 September 2009
- Party: Bangladesh Awami League

M. A. Manan (c. 1936–21 September 2009) was a Bangladesh Awami League politician. He was elected a member of parliament from Chittagong-7 in 1973 and from Chittagong-9 on 12 June 1996.

== Career ==
M. A. Manan was elected a member of parliament in 1973 Bangladeshi general election from Chittagong-7 as an Awami League candidate. He was elected a member of parliament in the 12 June 1996 Bangladeshi general election from Chittagong-9 as an Awami League candidate. He was defeated by participating in the national elections of the 2001 Bangladeshi general election as an Awami League candidate.

== Death ==
Manan died on 21 September 2009.
