= East Delta University =

Private University in Chattogram, Bangladesh

- ইস্ট ডেল্টা বিশ্ববিদ্যালয়
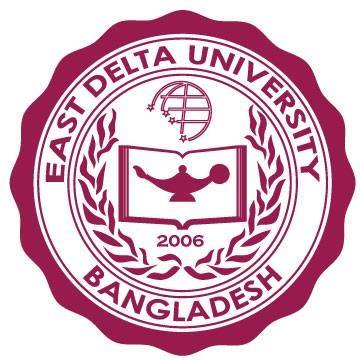
- The seal of East Delta University
- Motto: Advancing Knowledge, Enriching Lives
- Type: Private, nonprofit, research
- Established: 2006; 20 years ago, (academic operation started in 2008)
- Affiliations: University Grants Commission; Central Michigan University, Michigan, US
- Chancellor: President Hafiz Uddin Ahmad
- Vice-Chancellor: Mohammed Nazim Uddin
- Academic staff: 190
- Students: 4050
- Location: Chittagong, 4209, Bangladesh; 22.3726°N 91.8076°E
- Campus: 7 acres (2.8 ha); Urban
- Language: English
- Colors: Maroon, Gold
- Website: www.eastdelta.edu.bd
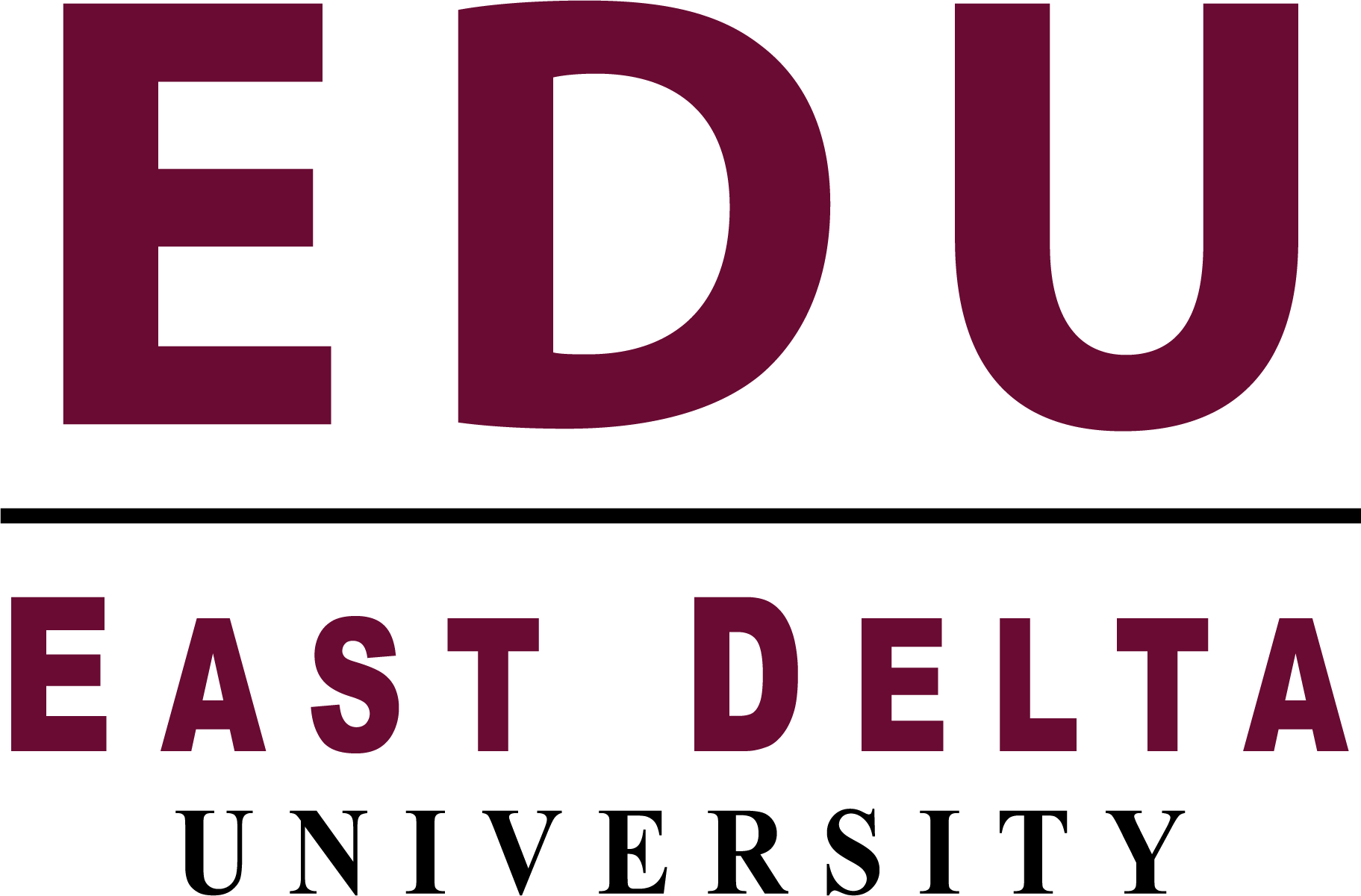

East Delta University (Bengali: ইস্ট ডেল্টা বিশ্ববিদ্যালয় or EDU) is a private university in Chattogram, Bangladesh. It was founded in 2006.

East Delta University is approved by the government of Bangladesh as well as the Bangladesh University Grants Commission (UGC) under the nation's private university rules.

The university is governed by the East Delta University Trust, a subsidiary of the Chittagong Foundation, an independent and non-partisan social welfare organization.

== Programs offered ==
The university offers four-year bachelor's degree in a limited number of subjects along with Master of Business Administration, MA in English and MSc/MPPL.

English is the medium of instruction. It has a School of Business, a School of Liberal Arts and Social Science, and a School of Science, Engineering & Technology.
