= Chittagong-9 =

Constituency of Bangladesh's Jatiya Sangsad

Coordinates: 22.41°N 91.82°E

- Constituency for the Jatiya Sangsad
- District: Chittagong District
- Division: Chittagong Division
- Electorate: 416,363 (2026)

Current constituency
- Created: 1973
- Party: Bangladesh Nationalist Party
- Member: Mohammad Abu Sufian
- ← 285 Chittagong-8 287 Chittagong-10 →

Chittagong-9 is a constituency represented in the Jatiya Sangsad (National Parliament) of Bangladesh since 2026 by Mohammad Abu Sufian of the Bangladesh Nationalist Party.

== Boundaries ==
The constituency encompasses Chittagong City Corporation wards 15 through 23 and 31 through 35.

== History ==
The constituency was created for the first general elections in newly independent Bangladesh, held in 1973.

Ahead of the 2008 general election, the Election Commission redrew constituency boundaries to reflect population changes revealed by the 2001 Bangladesh census. The 2008 reapportionment added one seat to Chittagong City and altered the boundaries of the three other seats in the city, including this one.

Ahead of the 2014 general election, the Election Commission renumbered the seat for Sandwip Upazila from Chittagong-16 to Chittagong-3, bumping up by one the suffix of the former constituency of that name and the higher numbered constituencies in the district. Thus Chittagong-9 covers the area previously covered by Chittagong-8. Previously Chittagong-9 encompassed Chittagong City Corporation wards 11 through 14, and 24 through 26, and part of ward 8.

In the 2018 general election, the constituency was one of six chosen by lottery to use electronic voting machines.

== Members of Parliament ==
Election	Member	Party
1973	Kafiluddin	Awami League
1979	Arif Moinuddin	Bangladesh Nationalist Party
1986	Mohammad Sekander Hossain Miah	Jatiya Party
1988	Mohammad Sekander Hossain Miah	Jatiya Party
1988 by-election	Harun Aur Rashid Khan	Jatiya Party
1991	Abdullah Al Noman	Bangladesh Nationalist Party
Feb 1996	Abdullah Al Noman	Bangladesh Nationalist Party
Jun 1996	M. A. Manan	Awami League
2001	Abdullah Al Noman	Bangladesh Nationalist Party
Major Boundary Changes
2008	Muhammad Afsarul Ameen	Awami League
Major Boundary Changes
2014	Ziauddin Ahmed Bablu	Jatiya Party (Ershad)
2018	Mohibul Hasan Chowdhury	Awami League
2024	Mohibul Hasan Chowdhury	Awami League
2026	Mohammad Abu Sufian	Bangladesh Nationalist Party

== Elections ==
=== Elections in the 2020s ===
General Election 2026: Chittagong-9
Party	Candidate	Votes	%	±%
BNP	Mohammad Abu Sufian	109,388	64.1	N/A
Jamaat	AKM Fazlul Haque	53,807	31.5	N/A
Islamic Front	Muhammad Waheed Murad	4,204	2.5	N/A
GSA	Sayed Mohammad Hasan	1,040	0.6	N/A
IAB	Abdus Shukkur	941	0.6	N/A
Janotar Dol	Md. Haider Ali Chowdhury	561	0.3	N/A
BSD (Marxist)	Md. Shafi Uddin Kabir	494	0.3	N/A
JSD (Rab)	Abdul Momen Chowdhury	128	0.1	N/A
IBB	Mohammad Naeem Uddin	112	0.1	N/A
Nagorik Oikko	Md. Nurul Abshar Majumder	107	0.1	N/A
Majority		55,581	32.5	N/A
Turnout		170,782	41.0	N/A
Registered electors		416,363		
BNP gain from AL				

=== Elections in the 2010s ===
General Election 2018: Chittagong-9
Party	Candidate	Votes	%	±%
AL	Mohibul Hasan Chowdhury	223,614	92.40	N/A
BNP	Shahadat Hossain	17,642	7.29	N/A
IAB	Md. Sheikh Amjad Hossain	742	0.31	N/A
Majority		205,972	85.11	
Turnout		331,411	70.88	
Registered electors		390,431		
AL gain from JP(E)				

General Election 2014: Chittagong-9
Party	Candidate	Votes	%	±%
JP(E)	Ziauddin Ahmed Bablu	79,779	91.9	+89.9
WPB	Mohammad Abu Hanif	3,599	4.1	N/A
BNF	Arif Moinuddin	1,762	2.0	N/A
NAP	Ali Ahmad Najir	1,641	1.9	N/A
Majority		76,180	87.8	+84.5
Turnout		86,781	23.9	−68.5
JP(E) gain from AL				

=== Elections in the 2000s ===
General Election 2008: Chittagong-9
Party	Candidate	Votes	%	±%
AL	Md. Afsarul Ameen	137,106	48.6	+3.1
BNP	Abdullah Al Noman	127,815	45.3	−8.1
Independent	M. Monjur Alam	9,535	3.4	N/A
JP(E)	Morshed Murad Ibrahim	5,758	2.0	N/A
IAB	Md. Unous Molla	1,954	0.7	N/A
BDB	Shahadat Hossain Majumder	203	0.1	N/A
Majority		9.291	3.3	−4.6
Turnout		282,371	92.4	+32.1
AL gain from BNP				

General Election 2001: Chittagong-9
Party	Candidate	Votes	%	±%
BNP	Abdullah Al Noman	131,639	52.8	+10.9
AL	M. A. Manan	111,935	44.9	−3.9
IJOF	Syed Muhibuddin Md. Toufique	2,236	0.9	N/A
BIF	M. A. Matin	1,230	0.5	+0.2
Liberal Party Bangladesh	Md. Ataullah Khan	930	0.4	N/A
BSD	Kazi Shahjahan	609	0.2	N/A
BKA	Md. Rashidul Haq	185	0.1	−0.1
Progressive Party	Alamgir Chowdhury	183	0.1	N/A
Independent	Md. Aslam	180	0.1	N/A
Independent	Nurul Islam	91	0.0	N/A
Jatiya Party (M)	Md. Yakub Hossain	67	0.0	N/A
Independent	Kazi Md. Yusuf	54	0.0	N/A
Independent	M. A. Salam	37	0.0	N/A
Majority		19,704	7.9	+1.0
Turnout		249,376	60.3	−6.5
BNP gain from AL				

=== Elections in the 1990s ===
General Election June 1996: Chittagong-9
Party	Candidate	Votes	%	±%
AL	M. A. Manan	99,240	48.8	+5.0
BNP	Abdullah Al Noman	85,171	41.9	−3.3
Jamaat	Afsar Uddin Chowdhury	10,724	5.3	−2.3
JP(E)	Md. Zahangir Alam	4,454	2.2	+0.9
Gano Forum	Kafil Uddin	2,097	1.0	N/A
BIF	Md. Abdus Shabur	606	0.3	+0.1
BSD	Kazi Shahjahan	453	0.2	N/A
NAP(B)	A. M. Abdul Goffar Khan	150	0.1	+0.1
Zaker Party	M. A. Haider Chowdhury	138	0.1	0.0
BKA	Mohammad Abdul Rajjak	114	0.1	+0.1
JSD	Md. Hasan Bachchu	88	0.0	N/A
Independent	Md. Oli Ahmed	70	0.0	N/A
Independent	Md. Azam Khan	67	0.0	N/A
Majority		14,069	6.9	+5.5
Turnout		203,372	66.8	+17.4
AL gain from BNP				

General Election 1991: Chittagong-9
Party	Candidate	Votes	%	±%
BNP	Abdullah Al Noman	49,818	45.2	
AL	A. B. M. Mohiuddin Chowdhury	48,245	43.8	
Jamaat	Afsar Uddin Chowdhury	8,392	7.6	
JP(E)	Dastagir Chowdhury	1,459	1.3	
BAKSAL	Md. Sirajul Haq	850	0.8	
BIF	Nurul Absar Chowdhury	167	0.2	
BML	M. A. Ansari	152	0.1	
Independent	Md. Abdussalam	148	0.1	
FP	S. K. Khoda	99	0.1	
Independent	Shukhomoy Chatterjee	88	0.1	
BKA	Md. Abdur Rahim Islamabadi	84	0.1	
Zaker Party	M. A. Haider Chowdhury	61	0.1	
Independent	Afaz Ullah Khan	56	0.1	
Independent	Abdul Hai	50	0.0	
JSD	Monsur Ahmad Shofi	35	0.0	
NAP(B)	Syed Mostofa Jamal	35	0.0	
Ganatantri Party	Abdul Halim	32	0.0	
Majority		1,573	1.4	
Turnout		110,140	49.4	
BNP gain from JP(E)				
