= Cadet Pollen murder =

2005 murder in Bangladesh

2005 Pollen Murder
- Location: Mymensingh Girls Cadet College, Mymensingh
- Date: February 2005
- Deaths: 1
- Perpetrators: Major Nazmul Haque; Sergeant Nowsheruzzaman; Associate Professor Abul Hossain; Major Monir Ahmed Chowdhury
- No. of participants: 4

Cadet Pollen murder refers to the murder of Cadet Sharmila Shaharin Pollen in Mymensingh Girls' Cadet College in 2005. The college authorities attempted to cover up the murder and make it look like a suicide.

== History ==
Pollen was a second year, grade 12 student in Mymensingh Girls' Cadet College. She had received GPA 5 in her SSC examinations in 2003, and was preparing for her upcoming HSC. Her father was Abul Bashar Patwary, a retired air force officer. She was found dead in Shanti House, a dorm of the college, on 11 February 2005. On 19 February 2005, her father filed a case with Cognisance Court No-1. On 23 February 2005, her father and mother, Taposhi Kawsar Majumder, at a press conference in Jatiya Press Club, they accused the police of refusing to accept a case and refuted the police report that said Pollen had committed suicide. They accused the adjutant of the college Major Najmul of being involved and accused that he made sexual advances towards her in the past. The college, Ministry of Home Affairs, and the Bangladesh Army Headquarters created their own probes.

The court ordered the Criminal Investigation Department to investigate the incident. The CID concurred with the police investigation. Patwary asked the court for a judicial probe, the court ordered magistrate Jahangir Hossain to investigate. Hossain was transferred during the investigation and Magistrate Al Amin replaced him. On 22 March 2013, the judicial probe submitted a report accusing five people of being involved in the murder. The accused were Major Nazmul Haque, adjutant of the college, Major Monir Ahmed Chowdhury, deputy adjutant of the college, Abul Hossain, an associate professor at the college, Sergent Nawsher-uz-Zaman, and Hena Begum, guards at the college.

According to probe report, she was tortured and hit with a blunt instrument, knocking her unconscious. She was strangled by the adjutant, Major Nazmul. She was then hung with a scarf to make it appear that, she committed suicide. On 14 January 2016, charges were framed against the accused at Mymensingh District and Sessions Judge's Court. On 16 May 2016, Bangladesh High Court rejected an appeal by the accused to stop the proceeding of the case. On 5 June 2017, Bangladesh Supreme Court dismissed the leave to appeal petition by the accused challenging the earlier decision by the Bangladesh High Court. This allowed the proceeding of the case to resume at the lower court in Mymensingh.

The accused Nazmul has since been promoted to Lieutenant Colonel and is stationed at Bangladesh Army Headquarters. Sergeant Nawsher-uz-Zaman was promoted to warrant officer and was stationed as a platoon commander in Rangamati Cantonment. Professor Abul Hossain is retired and living in Dhaka, Hena Begum is still working at the college. Major Munir Ahammed has disappeared.
