= Abdullah Al Noman =

Bangladeshi politician (1942–2025)

- আব্দুল্লাহ আল নোমান
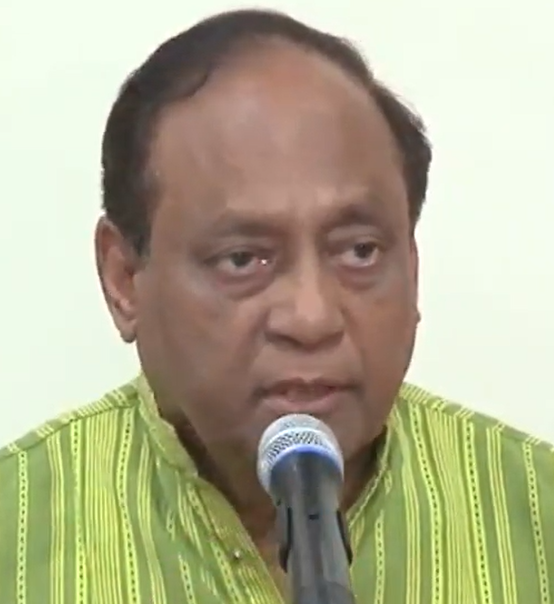
- Noman in 2017

Minister of Fisheries and Livestock
- In office 6 May 2004 – 29 October 2006
- Prime Minister: Khaleda Zia
- Preceded by: Sadeque Hossain Khoka
- Succeeded by: Muhammad Abdul Latif Biswas
- In office 20 March 1991 – 30 March 1996
- Prime Minister: Khaleda Zia
- Preceded by: Qazi Fazlur Rahman
- Succeeded by: A. Z. A. Nasiruddin

Minister of Food
- In office 11 March 2002 – 6 May 2004
- Prime Minister: Khaleda Zia
- Preceded by: Tariqul Islam
- Succeeded by: Mohammad Abdur Razzaque

Minister of Environment, Forest and Climate Change
- In office 20 March 1991 – 13 September 1993
- Prime Minister: Khaleda Zia
- Preceded by: Qazi Fazlur Rahman
- Succeeded by: Akbar Hossain

Member of the Bangladesh Parliament for Chittagong-9
- In office 5 March 1991 – 30 March 1996
- Preceded by: Mohammad Sekander Hossain Miah
- Succeeded by: M. A. Manan
- In office 28 October 2001 – 27 October 2006
- Preceded by: M. A. Manan
- Succeeded by: Nurul Islam

Personal details
- Born: 2 July 1942 Gohira, Raozan Upazila, Chittagong Division, Bengal Province, British India
- Died: 25 February 2025 (aged 82) Dhaka, Bangladesh
- Party: Bangladesh Nationalist Party
- Spouse: Tasmin Ara Noman
- Children: 3, including Sayeed
- Occupation: Politician

Military service
- Allegiance: Bangladesh
- Branch/service: Mukti Bahini
- Battles/wars: Bangladesh Liberation War

Abdullah Al Noman (2 July 1942 – 25 February 2025) was a Bangladeshi politician who served as the vice-chairman of the Bangladesh Nationalist Party. He was a three-term Jatiya Sangsad member representing the Chittagong-9 constituency. He served as a minister of fisheries and food in the third Khaleda Cabinet.

== Early life ==
Noman's brother Abdullah Al Haroun was a founder of Chittagong city unit of the Awami League and son is law of Malek Ukil. Mayor A. B. M. Mohiuddin Chowdhury is his uncle.

== Career ==
Noman was an activist of Chhatra Union before joining the Bangladesh Nationalist Party.

Noman was elected to parliament from Kotwali, Chittagong-9 in 1991.

On 19 August 1998, the Bureau of Anti-Corruption Commission sued Noman for failure to submit a wealth statement with Dhanmondi Police Station. The charge sheet was submitted on 30 May 2000. The case was taken over by the Anti-Corruption Commission, which succeeded the Bureau of Anti-Corruption Commission in 2004.

Noman was elected to parliament from Chittagong-9 in 2001 as a candidate of the Bangladesh Nationalist Party. He served as the minister of fisheries and livestock in the Third Khaleda Zia Cabinet.

Noman contested the 9th general election from Chittagong-9 in 2008 as a candidate of the Bangladesh Nationalist Party. He lost the election to Afsarul Amin. Noman had received 127,815 votes against Amin's 137,106 votes. Noman alleged that the election was rigged in favour of the Awami League.

Charges from the 1998 Bureau of Anti-Corruption Commission case were framed against Noman with the Dhaka Divisional Special Judges' Court on 2 February 2009. Noman filed an application with the Bangladesh High Court against the framing of the charges, which was rejected by the court on 24 January 2013. He filed a leave to appeal against the verdict of Bangladesh High Court, which was rejected on 25 January 2016 on a technicality.

In 2009, Noman was engaged in a struggle with Salahuddin Quader Chowdhury to take control of the Bangladesh Nationalist Party in Chittagong. He was at that time the joint secretary general of the Chittagong City unit of the Bangladesh Nationalist Party. In November 2009, supporters of Noman vandalized the Institution of Engineers, Bangladesh (IEB) auditorium in Chittagong, in which the council of the Chittagong City unit of the Bangladesh Nationalist Party was taking place.

On 7 April 2013, Noman was sent to jail in connection with a number of criminal cases. Jatiyatabadi Swechhasebak Dal called for a strike in Chittagong the next day protesting the decision.

Noman told reporters that he was considering quitting the Bangladesh Nationalist Party in August 2016 after he did not receive a seat on the standing committee of the Bangladesh Nationalist Party.

Bangladesh Police from Tongi Police Station arrested Noman on 7 May 2018 from Gazipur near the home of the Bangladesh Nationalist Party candidate of Gazipur City Corporation, Hasan Uddin Sarkar, over allegations of vandalism with 12 other activists of Bangladesh Nationalist Party. Noman was released soon after, but the rest were detained by the police for questioning.

Noman reported that his rally in Chittagong on 16 December 2018, on the occasion of the victory day of the Bangladesh Liberation War, was attacked by armed supporters of the Awami League.

Noman complained to the Bangladesh Election Commission on 17 March 2020, during the Chattogram City Corporation election campaign, that Awami League activists and Bangladesh Police personnel were interfering with the election campaign of the Bangladesh Nationalist Party.

== Death ==
On 25 February 2025, he suffered a cardiac arrest at his residence in Dhanmondi, Dhaka. He was taken to Square Hospital in the capital, where he was declared dead. He died at the age of 82.
