= Kalurghat Bridge =

Kalurghat Bridge কালুরঘাট সেতু
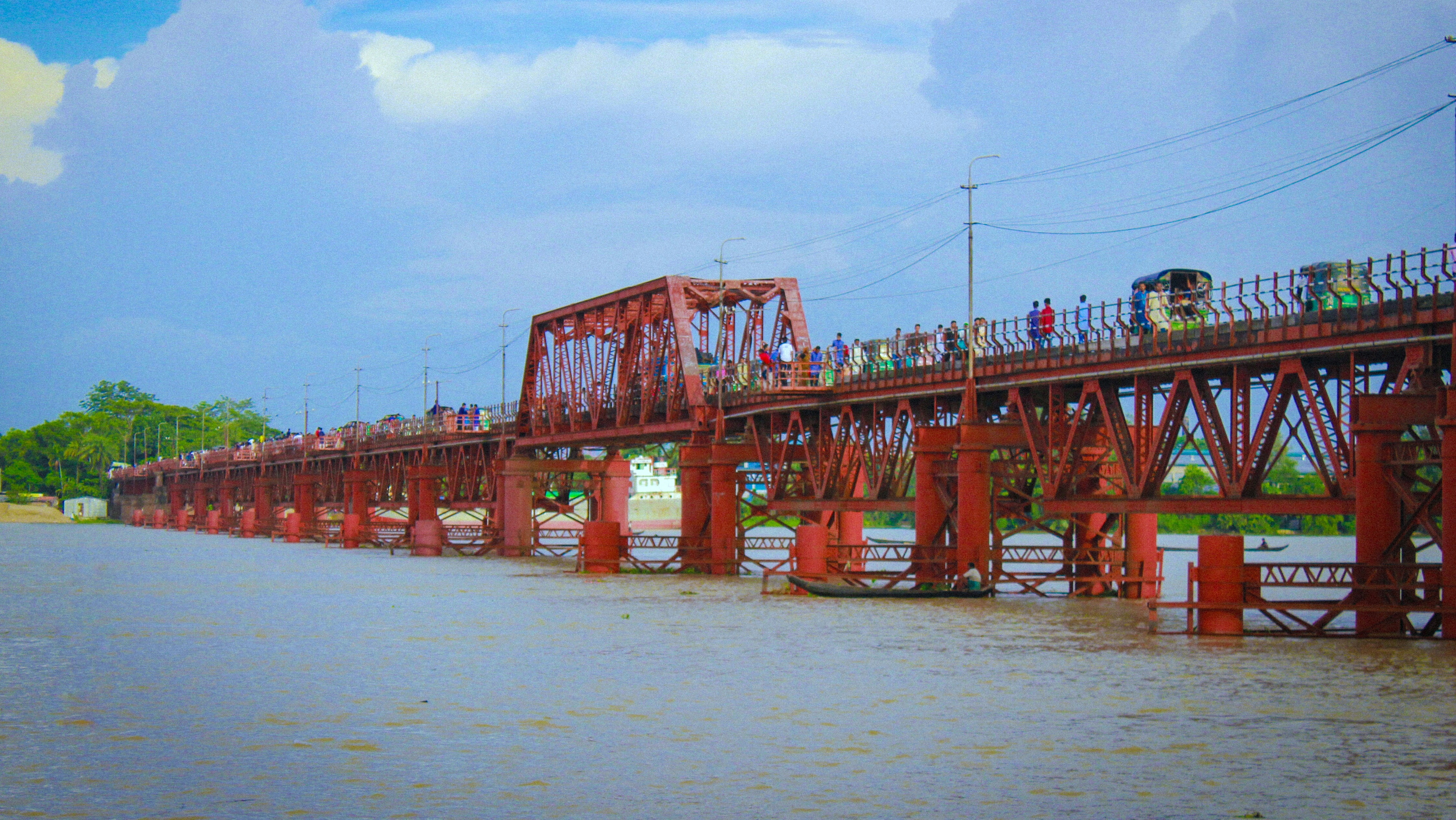
- Kalurghat Bridge in 2017
- Coordinates: 22.39585°N 91.88911°E
- Locale: Kalurghat, Chittagong, Bangladesh
- Begins: 1930
- Ends: 1930

Characteristics
- Total length: 239 metres (784 ft)
- No. of spans: 13

History
- Constructed by: Brunick & Company Bridge Builders Howrah
- Opened: 4 June 1930

Kalurghat Bridge is situated over Karnaphuli river. It is located in Chittagong, Bangladesh. From prehistoric times, the site has played a role in river crossings called "Kalur Ghat". Later, this 239 metres (784 ft) long railway bridge was built during the British rule in 1930. Locally, the bridge is popularly known as "Kalurghat's Pole".

It connects the greater Chittagong district bisected by the Karnaphuli river to the north and south. The ninety-years-old bridge was the only link in the southern part of Chittagong, until the inauguration of the Shah Amanat Bridge in 1989. Hence it is called the gateway of South Chittagong.

In 2001, this bridge was declared vulnerable by the Bangladesh Railway. In 2011, a group of researchers from Chittagong University of Engineering and Technology (CUET) announced another risk. In order to use the bridge even for a higher axel load to operate the Dhaka Cox's Bazar direct train link, repair and strengthening of the bridge was necessary based on a detail engineering assessment. A F M Saiful Amin from Bangladesh University of Engineering and Technology helped the nation to overcome this challenge. This resulted the Dhaka – Cox's Bazar Train line as the most demanding longest train of Bangladesh. The bridge deck was extended by a 6 feet wide dedicated walkway for pedestrians. This attracted the local users in meeting their daily needs for all weather 24/7 safe passage in crossing the bridge.

== Location ==
It was built at a place called Kalurghat, 7/8 miles upstream from the mouth of the Karnaphuli river, the source of Chittagong, the commercial capital of Bangladesh. Which is geographically located south of Chittagong city.

== History ==
In 1914, the construction of a bridge across the Karnaphuli River became necessary to guide the troops of the Burma Front during the World War I. As a result, in 1930 Brunick & Company Bridge Builders Howrah, a bridge construction company, built the bridge. Initially, it was a 700-yard-long rail bridge of steel structure between Janalihut and Gomdandi railway stations, which was inaugurated on 4 June 1930. Later in World War II, the deck was installed for motor vehicles again in the fighting on the Burma front. After the partition of the country in 1947, the deck was removed. Later in 1962, the bridge was given its present form by making it passable to all types of vehicles.

The bridge was constructed with 13 different types of spans including one 45.72 metres (150.0 ft) steel girder, twelve 30.48 metres (100.0 ft) under-slung ones, five pieces of 24.38 metres (80.0 ft) and a single 12.19 metres (40.0 ft) deck type span and twelve 4.88 metres (16.0 ft) joists.

=== In liberation war ===
Although Kalurghat Betar Kendra, which played a historical role in the Bangladesh Liberation War, is located in the area adjacent to the place called Bahaddarhat, due to the nationwide recognition of Kalurghat, this centre was also established as the Kalurghat Betar Kendra. The liberation war, between the Mukti Bahini and the Pakistan Armed Forces over the occupation of the western and northern banks of the Kalurghat Bridge is memorable.
