= Muhammad Afsarul Ameen =

Bangladeshi politician (1952–2023)

- মুহাম্মদ আফছারুল আমিন

Member of Parliament
- In office 20 December 2008 – 2 June 2023
- Preceded by: Morshed Khan
- Succeeded by: Md Mohiuddin Bacchu
- Constituency: Chittagong-10

Minister of Primary and Mass Education
- In office 6 January 2009 – 24 January 2014
- Prime Minister: Sheikh Hasina
- Preceded by: Rasheda K Chowdhury
- Succeeded by: Mostafizur Rahman

Personal details
- Born: 1 January 1952 Chittagong, East Bengal, Pakistan
- Died: 2 June 2023 (aged 71) Dhaka, Bangladesh
- Cause of death: Cancer
- Party: Bangladesh Awami League
- Education: Chittagong Medical College
- Profession: Doctor, businessman, and politician

Muhammad Afsarul Ameen (1 January 1952 – 2 June 2023) was a Bangladeshi Awami League politician. He became the member of parliament for Chittagong-9 in 2008, was re-elected to the constituency (renumbered Chittagong-10) in 2014 and 2018, and was the Minister of Primary and Mass Education until 2014.

== Early life ==
Ameen was born on 1 January 1952. He graduated with MBBS degree from Chittagong Medical College.

== Career ==
Ameen was elected to parliament from Chittagong-9 in 2008 as a candidate of Awami League. He received 137,106 votes while his nearest rival, Abdullah Al Noman of Bangladesh Nationalist Party, received 127,815 votes.

Ameen was elected unopposed from Chittagong-10 as a candidate of Awami League in 2014. The election was boycotted by all major political parties and Awami League got majority of the seats without elections.

Ameen was re-elected to parliament from Chittagong-10 as a candidate for Awami League in 2018. He received 287,047 votes while his nearest rival, again Abdullah Al Noman, received 41,390 votes. Ameen served as the chairperson of the Parliamentary Standing Committee on Education.

He was the vice president of the Chittagong City chapter of the Awami League.

== Death ==
Ameen died of lung cancer at Square Hospital in Dhaka on 2 June 2023. He was 71.
