= Liaquat Ali (Chittagong politician) =

Bangladeshi politician

Member of Bangladesh Parliament
- In office 1988–1990

Personal details
- Party: Jatiya Party (Ershad)

Liaquat Ali (Bengali: লিয়াকত আলী) is a Jatiya Party (Ershad) politician in Bangladesh and a former member of parliament for Chittagong-8.

== Career ==
Ali was elected to parliament from Chittagong-8 as a Jatiya Party candidate in 1988.
