= Dewanhat, Chittagong =

Retail market in Chittagong, Bangladesh

Dewanhat
- Location: Double Mooring, Chittagong, Bangladesh; 22.3387791°N 91.8133802°E
- Opening date: c. 1758
- Developer: Chittagong Development Authority
- Goods sold: Earthenware, Birds
- Parking: no
- Interactive map of Dewanhat, Chittagong

Dewanhat is a popular bazaar in Chittagong, Bangladesh. The name is an adjunct of the words Persian word "Dewan" (a high government ministry) and "hat" (bazaar). It belongs to Double Mooring police station in the west adjacent to Postarpar of the city. Earlier, a bazaar was held here twice a week. In the beginning, the market was big, but now its size is getting smaller. Now there are markets for pigeons and various birds with earthenware and clay pots. Also, daily morning labourers and masons wait here for work.

== History ==
Posta was an important gateway to the medieval port city of Chittagong. The word Posta comes from the Persian word "pust" meaning reverse side or back side. This adjective is also used as a place name in Persian tradition. The location of Postar Par in medieval times was towards the opposite side or back side of the city in view of the riverside port. From 1742 to 1751 during the Nawabi rule of Bengal, Maha Singh was the Diwan of the Mughal administrator in Chittagong. He was appointed Naib Subedar in 1753 and served till 1758. Maha Singh chose this place near Postarpar to set up the Dewanhat. Later Dewanhat was named after him as a memorial.
