= Noman Al Mahmud =

Bangladeshi politician

- নোমান আল মাহমুদ

Member of the Bangladesh Parliament for Chittagong-8
- In office 9 May 2023 – 10 January 2024
- Preceded by: Moslem Uddin Ahmad
- Succeeded by: Abdus Salam

Personal details
- Party: Bangladesh Awami League

Noman Al Mahmud is a Bangladesh Awami League politician who was a Member of Parliament from Chittagong-8 constituency. Mahmud is the Chittagong unit organizing secretary of the Awami League. In the by-election he got 67,205 votes while his nearest rival, the Bangladesh Islami Front's Sehab Uddin, got 5,087 votes.
