= Morshed Khan =

Bangladeshi politician (born 1940)

- মোর্শেদ খান
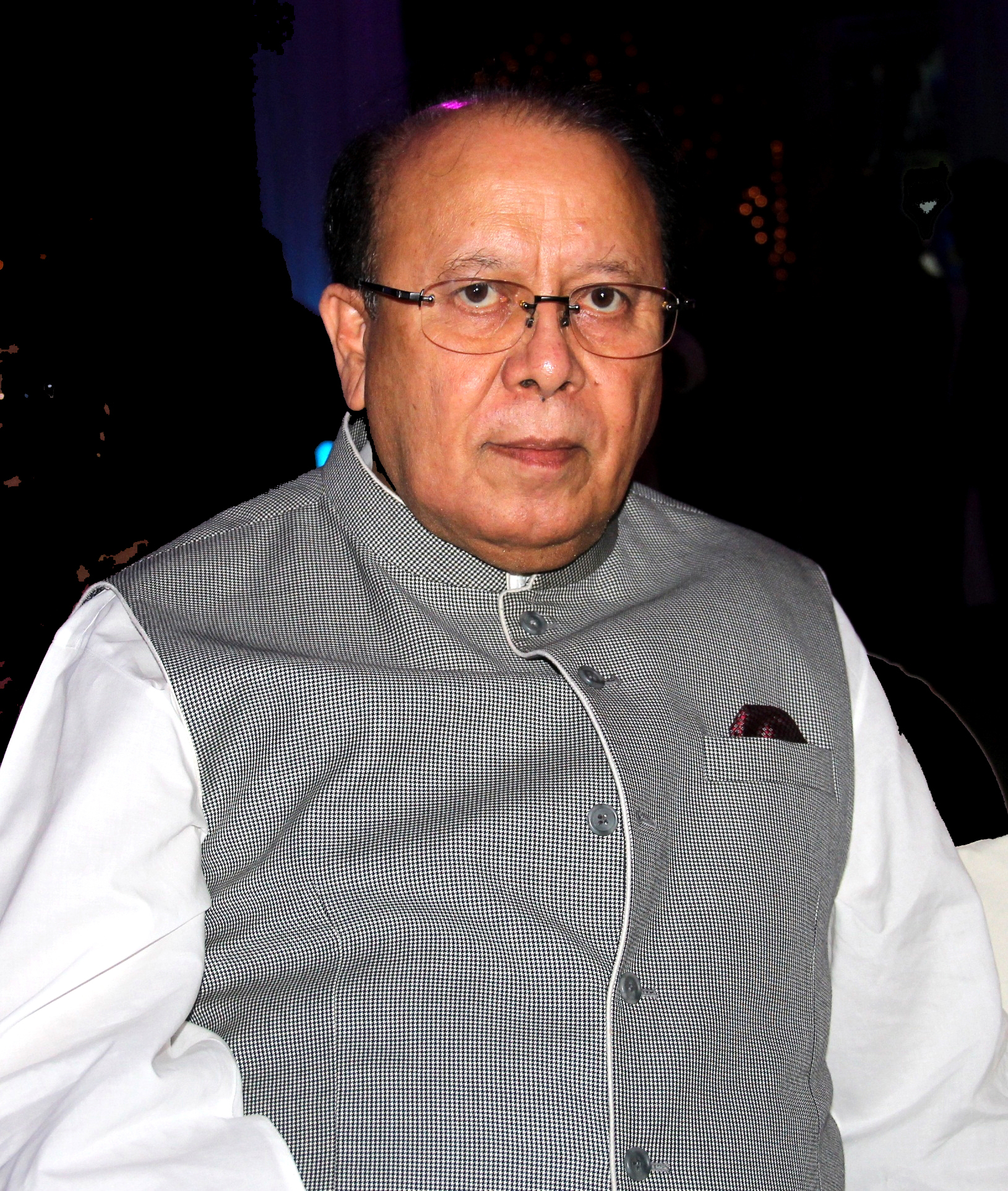
- Khan in 2014

Minister of Foreign Affairs
- In office 14 November 2001 – 29 October 2006
- Prime Minister: Khaleda Zia
- Preceded by: A. Q. M. Badruddoza Chowdhury
- Succeeded by: Iajuddin Ahmed

Member of Bangladesh Parliament
- In office 19 March 1996 – 27 October 2006
- Preceded by: Sirajul Islam Chowdhury
- Succeeded by: Muhammad Afsarul Ameen
- Constituency: Chittagong-10
- In office 7 May 1986 – 3 March 1988
- Preceded by: Sirajul Islam Chowdhury
- Succeeded by: Begum Kamrun Nahar Jafar
- Constituency: Chittagong-10

Personal details
- Born: 8 August 1940 (age 86) Chittagong, Bengal Province, British India
- Party: Bangladesh Nationalist Party
- Other political affiliations: Jatiya Party (Ershad)
- Spouse: Nasrin Khan
- Education: Tokyo University of Agriculture and Technology
- Occupation: Politician

Morshed Khan (born 8 August 1940) is a Bangladeshi politician who served as the minister of foreign affairs of Bangladesh from 2001 until 2006. He served as a Jatiya Sangsad member representing the Chittagong-10 constituency in the 6th, 7th and 8th parliaments.He is the founder chairman of one of the leading private bank - AB Bank Limited and Pacific Motors limited.

Khan was imprisoned in May 2009 in connection with a graft case in which he was sentenced to 13 years.

== Education ==
Khan completed his Bachelor of Engineering study from Tokyo University of Agriculture and Technology.

== Career ==
In 1986, Khan was elected to the Jatiya Sangsad. He was then elected to parliament three more times (February 1996, June 1996, and 2001). He was the special envoy to the prime minister during the tenure of the full-fledged minister from 12 to 8, and was also the chairman of the Bangladesh Special Committee on Foreign Affairs. Morshed Khan served as the foreign minister of the government of Bangladesh from 2001 to 2006.

Khan retired from politics by resigning from the vice president post of BNP on 5 November 2019.

== Charges and convictions ==
In December 2007, the Anti-Corruption Commission (ACC) filed cases against Khan and his wife for amassing Tk 1.7 crore wealth illegally and concealing information about wealth worth Tk 91.34 lakh in his wealth statement submitted to ACC. In August 2008, a special judge's court convicted Khan and sentenced him to 13 years' imprisonment. The High Court, in August 2010, suspended that sentence following an appeal by Khan.

In 2013, ACC filed a case Khan, his wife Nasrin Khan and their son Faisal Morshed Khan under the Money Laundering Prevention Act. In September 2019, a Dhaka court allowed the government and ACC to confiscate their assets in Hong Kong. The assets include Hong Kong dollar worth Tk 16 crore with Standard Chartered Bank and 16.8 lakh shares of Fareast Telecommunications Ltd in Hong Kong.

== Personal life ==
Khan is married to Nasrin Khan (originally from Jalpaiguri). His son, Faisal Morshed Khan, was the managing director of the mobile operator of Citycell Mobile, Pacific Bangladesh Telecom. Faisal is married to his cousin, the daughter of A. M. Zahiruddin Khan (his father Morshed Khan's first-cousin). Morshed Khan's daughter is married Shayan Rahman, the only son of Salman F Rahman.
