= Ershad Ullah =

Bangladeshi politician

- এরশাদ উল্লাহ

Member of Parliament
- Incumbent
- Assumed office 17 February 2026
- Preceded by: Abdus Salam
- Constituency: Chittagong-8

Personal details
- Born: 21 March 1954 (age 72) Chittagong, East Pakistan
- Party: Bangladesh Nationalist Party

Ershad Ullah (Bengali: এরশাদ উল্লাহ) is a Bangladesh Nationalist Party politician and an elected Member of Parliament from Chittagong-8. He also serves as the convenor of the Chittagong Metropolitan unit of the BNP.
