= Abul Kasem (Chittagong politician) =

Bangladeshi politician

Member of Bangladesh Parliament
- In office 1973–1976

Personal details
- Born: 12 December 1911
- Died: 4 April 1999 (aged 87)
- Party: Awami League

Abul Kasem (Bengali: আবুল কাসেম, 12 December 1911 – 4 April 1999) was an Awami League politician and a member of parliament for Chittagong-10.

== Career ==
Kasem was elected to parliament from Chittagong-10 as an Awami League candidate in 1973.
