= Moslem Uddin Ahmad =

Bangladeshi politician (1948–2023)

- মোছলেম উদ্দিন আহমদ
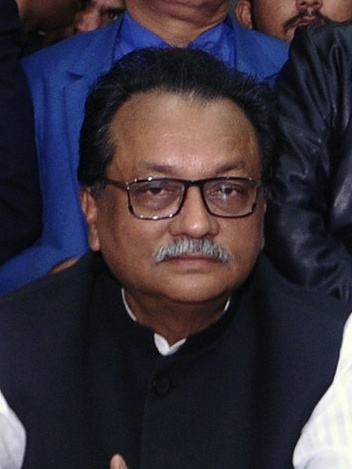
- Moslem Uddin Ahmad in 2019.

Member of Parliament
- In office 13 January 2020 – 6 February 2023
- Preceded by: Moin Uddin Khan Badal
- Succeeded by: Noman Al Mahmud
- Constituency: Chittagong-8

Personal details
- Born: 1 June 1948 Chittagong, East Bengal
- Died: 6 February 2023 (aged 74) Dhaka, Bangladesh
- Party: Bangladesh Awami League

Moslem Uddin Ahmad (1 June 1948 – 6 February 2023) was a Bangladesh Awami League politician who was a Jatiya Sangsad member representing the Chittagong-8 constituency from January 2020 until his death.

== Biography ==
Ahmad was appointed the vice president of the Government College of Commerce, Chittagong unit of Chhatra League in 1969. Later, he was appointed the general secretary of the Chittagong unit of the Chhatra League. He was also appointed the acting general secretary of the Chittagong unit of the Chhatra League in 1970.

Ahmad took part in the Liberation War of Bangladesh. After the Liberation of Bangladesh he was appointed the general secretary of the Chittagong unit of the Chhatra League in 1972. He was the president of the Chittagong South District Unit of the Bangladesh Awami League.

Ahmad was elected as a member of the Jatiya Sangsad from Chittagong-8 on 13 January 2020.

Ahmad died from cancer at the Evercare Hospital Dhaka, on 6 February 2023, at the age of 74.
