= Bangladesh Jatiya Samajtantrik Dal =

Political party in Bangladesh

Bangladesh Jatiya Samajtantrik Dal বাংলাদেশ জাতীয় সমাজতান্ত্রিক দল
- Abbreviation: Bangladesh JaSaD; Bangladesh JASOD; Bangladesh JSD; BJSD
- President: Sharif Nurul Ambia
- General Secretary: Nazmul Haque Prodhan
- Founded: 2016; 10 years ago
- Split from: Jatiya Samajtantrik Dal
- Ideology: Democratic socialism; Progressivism (Bangladeshi); Anti-imperialism; Secularism (Bangladeshi)
- Political position: Left-wing
- National affiliation: Democratic United Front
- Colours: Purple
- Bangladesh Parliament: 0 / 300

Election symbol
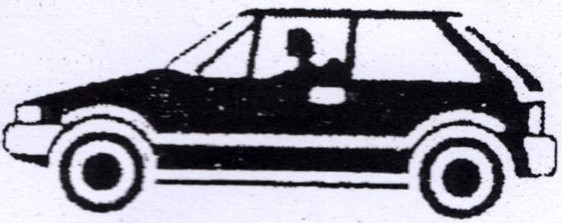
- Car

Party flag
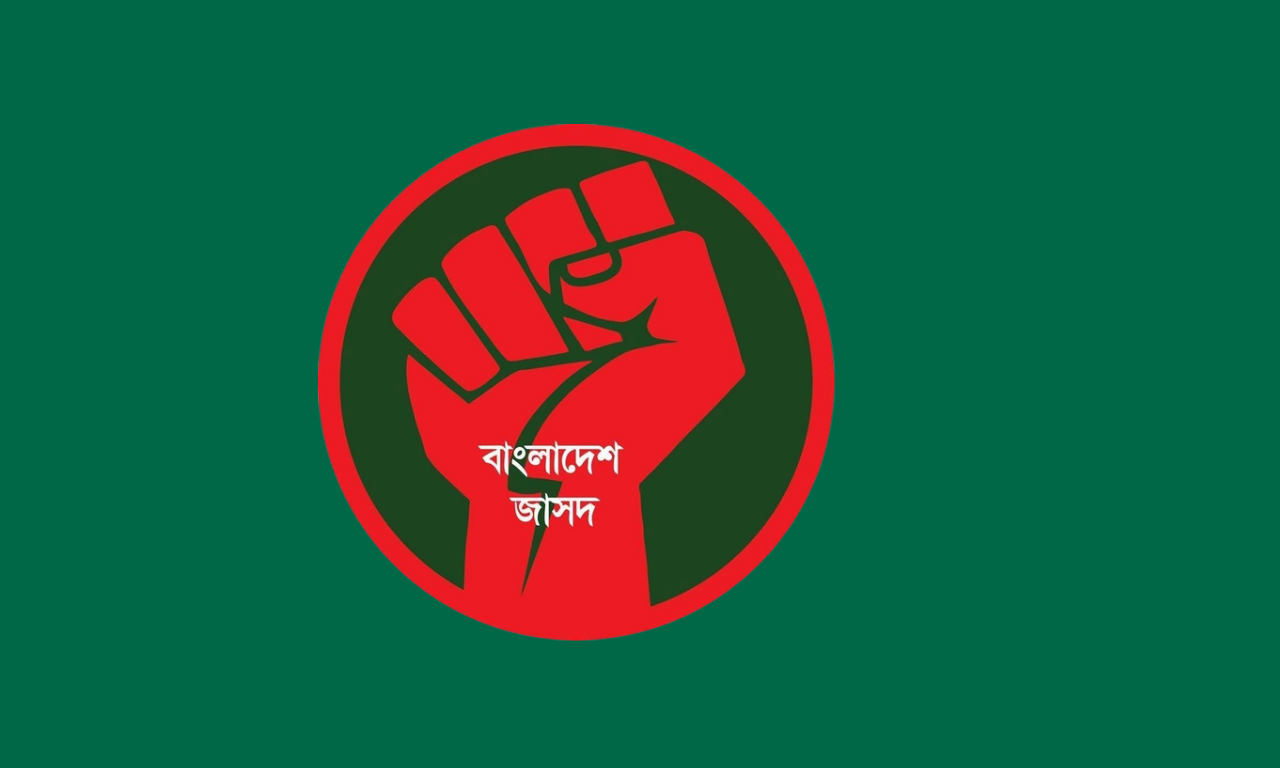

The Bangladesh Jatiya Samajtantrik Dal is a political party in Bangladesh, led by Sharif Nurul Ambia. The party emerged from a split in the Inu-led Jatiya Samajtantrik Dal in 2016. Sharif Nurul Ambia became the president of the new JSD faction, Moinuddin Khan Badal the executive president and Nazmul Haque Prodhan as general secretary. The party joined the Awami League-led 14-Party Alliance. Ahead of the 2018 Bangladeshi general election, the Awami League allowed the party to field its candidate Mayeen Uddin Khan Badal to contest the Chittagong-8 seat on their election symbol. In 2022, the party left the 14-Party Alliance.

In June 2023, the party got registered by the Election Commission. The commission allocated the symbol 'motorcar' instead of 'elephant's requested by the party, as the latter one was not reserved in the list of symbols for political parties.

The party currently works alongside the Left Democratic Alliance in joint political activities, including coordinated statements, shared positions on national issues, and participation in demands for the resignation of then Prime Minister Sheikh Hasina and the transfer of power to an interim government.
