= Mayeen Uddin Khan Badal =

Bangladeshi politician (1952–2019)

- মইন উদ্দীন খান বাদল
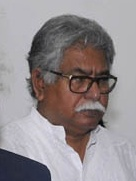
- Badal in 2015.

Member of Parliament
- In office 25 January 2009 – 7 November 2019
- Preceded by: Amir Khasru Mahmud Chowdhury
- Succeeded by: Moslem Uddin Ahmad
- Constituency: Chittagong-8

Personal details
- Born: 21 February 1952 Boalkhali Upazila, Chittagong, East Bengal, Dominion of Pakistan
- Died: 7 November 2019 (aged 67) Bengaluru, India
- Party: Bangladesh JaSaD (2016-2019)
- Other political affiliations: Jatiya Samajtantrik Dal-JaSaD (1972-2016); Grand Alliance (2008-2016, 2018-2019)

Mayeen Uddin Khan Badal (21 February 1952 – 7 November 2019) was a Bangladesh JaSaD politician. He was an MP of Chittagong-7 and Chittagong-8.

== Early life ==
Badal was born on 21 February 1952, in Sarowatali village in Boalkhali Upazila, Chittagong to Ahmadullah Khan and Zatuma Khatun. Badal was involved with the Chhatra League in his student days, actively taking part in the Bangladesh Liberation War. He was one of the key persons who tried to prevent offloading of firearms at Chittagong port during the war. He studied at the Chittagong Collegiate School.

== Career ==
Badal was elected to parliament from Chittagong-7 in 2008 as a candidate of the Jatiya Samajtantrik Dal. He was also a candidate of the Grand Alliance. On 26 February 2009, he visited the gates of Bangladesh Rifles headquarters during the Bangladesh Rifles mutiny and met mutineers. He was an adviser of the CVO Petrochemical Refinery, a public limited company. He served as the executive president of the Jatiya Samajtantrik Dal.

Badal was elected to parliament again in 2014 from Chittagong-8. On 17 June 2015, he called upon the speaker of the parliament to issue a ruling to prevent the money laundering from Bangladeshi banks. In 2016, Badal and Sharif Nurul Ambia led a breakaway faction of Jatiya Samajtantrik Dal. The split happened after the president of Jatiya Samajtantrik Dal, Hasanul Haq Inu, appointed Shirin Akhter, member of parliament, the general secretary of the party. The appointment was opposed by Badal and Sharif Nurul Ambia. He blamed Inu for the split in the party.

On 1 March 2017, Badal criticised Human Rights Watch for its report on Bangladesh and denied allegations of torture against the government.

== Personal life ==
Badal was married to Selina Khan.

== Death ==
Badal died on 7 November 2019 at the age of 67, at a hospital in Bangalore of India on Thursday morning, he died at 7:45am while undergoing treatment at Devi Shetty's Narayana Hrudalayala Hospitals of Bangalore.

After the resignation of Sheikh Hasina, Badal's grave was vandalized and set on fire in Sarwatli, Boalkhali Upazila, Chittagong District.
