= Amir Khasru Mahmud Chowdhury =

Bangladeshi politician

- আমীর খসরু মাহমুদ চৌধুরী
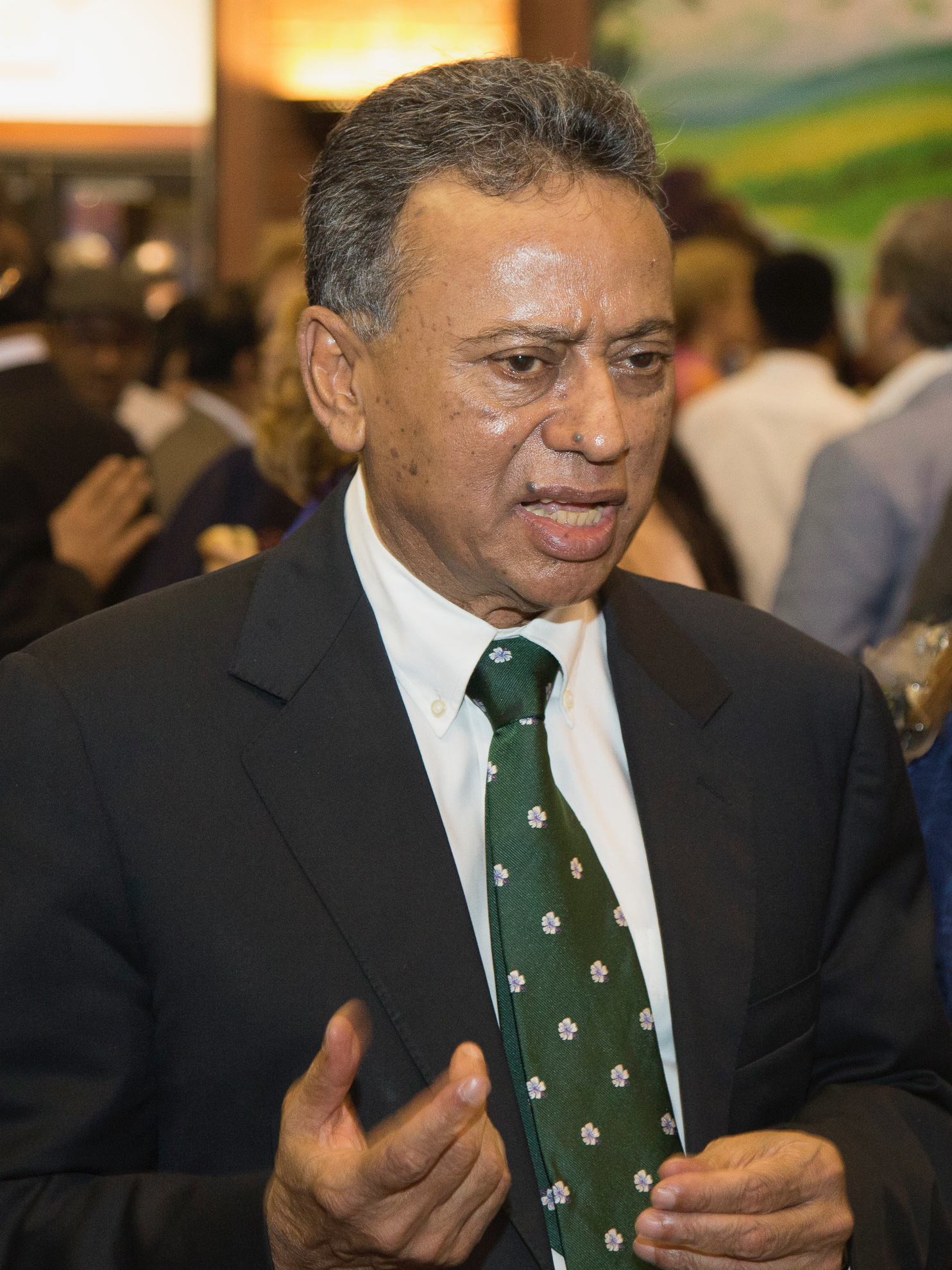
- Chowdhury at US Embassy Dhaka in 2018

Minister of Finance
- Incumbent
- Assumed office 17 February 2026
- Prime Minister: Tarique Rahman
- Preceded by: Salehuddin Ahmed

Minister of Planning
- Incumbent
- Assumed office 17 February 2026
- Prime Minister: Tarique Rahman
- Preceded by: Wahiduddin Mahmud

Member of Parliament
- Incumbent
- Assumed office 17 February 2026
- Preceded by: M. Abdul Latif
- Constituency: Chittagong-11
- In office September 1991 – 29 October 2006
- Preceded by: Khaleda Zia
- Succeeded by: Nurul Islam
- Constituency: Chittagong-8

Minister for Commerce
- In office 10 October 2001 – 25 March 2004
- Prime Minister: Khaleda Zia
- Preceded by: Abdul Jalil
- Succeeded by: Altaf Hossain Chowdhury

Personal details
- Born: 10 November 1949 (age 76) North Kattali, Chittagong, East Bengal
- Party: Bangladesh Nationalist Party
- Children: 1
- Parent: Mahmudunnabi Chowdhury (father)
- Education: Chittagong College; London School of Economics
- Occupation: Politician

Amir Khasru Mahmud Chowdhury (born 10 November 1949) is a Bangladeshi politician, businessesman, accountant and diplomat who has served as the Minister of Economy and Planning of Bangladesh since 2026. A member of parliament for four terms and a senior member of the Bangladesh Nationalist Party, he also served as the Minister of Commerce from 2001 to 2004. Amir also previously served as the chairman and founder of Chittagong Stock Exchange, and as the president of Chittagong Chamber of Commerce and Industries.

== Early life and education ==
Amir Khosru was born on 20 February 1950 to a Bengali family of Muslim Chowdhuries in the Nazir Bari of North Kattali, Pahartali in the Chittagong District of East Bengal, Pakistan (now Bangladesh). His father, Mahmudunnabi Chowdhury, served as the Minister of Mass Communication, and then as the Minister for Relief and Rehabilitation and as a member of the East Pakistan Legislative Assembly.

Chowdhury graduated with a Bachelor's degree from Chittagong College in 1969. He then moved in London, England and studied accounting at the London School of Economics and Political Science.

== Career ==
Amir Khosru was elected as a Member of Parliament from Chittagong-8 thrice from the Bangladesh Nationalist Party. First in 1991 which was a by-election, second in 1996, third in 2001 and fourth in 2026.

Chowdhury is a businessman and former chairman and founder of Chittagong Stock Exchange, a former president of Chittagong Chamber of Commerce and Industries and the first president of Federation of South Asian Exchanges. He was the former commerce minister in the BNP government from 2001 to 2004.

Chowdhury resigned on 25 March 2004 from the cabinet. He resigned following allegations that he had allowed a syndicate to raise the price of essential commodities in Bangladesh. Another reason for the resignation was his supposed rivalry with the Minister of Finance, Saifur Rahman. Speculation at the time suggest that it could be linked to Chowdhury approving opening of a commerce office of Taiwan.

On 31 October 2007, arrest warrants were issued against Chowdhury on a corruption case filled by the Anti-Corruption Commission. He had fled Bangladesh during the crackdown on corruption by the Caretaker Government.

Chowdhury called for the removal of acting mayor of Chittagong City Corporation, Zahirul Alam Dobhash, ahead of mayoral elections in 2010. He was the chief election agent of M Manjur Alam, the Bangladesh Nationalist Party candidate for mayor. Following a complaint by Chowdhury against executive magistrate Salehin Tanvir Gazi of favoring the Awami League candidate the Election Commission withdrew Gazi.

Chowdhury's, then President of Chittagong unit of Bangladesh Nationalist Party, Jatiyatabadi Jubo Dal supporters clashed with the supporters of the General Secretary of Chittagong City unit of Bangladesh Nationalist Party Dr Shahadat Hossain in December 2011.

Chowdhury was part of the Bangladesh Nationalist Party delegation to the Democracy, good governance and human rights in Bangladesh, held in July 2013 in London. Chowdhury's, then President of Chittagong unit of Bangladesh Nationalist Party, Jatiyatabadi Chhatra Dal supporters clashed with the supporters of the General Secretary of Chittagong City unit of Bangladesh Nationalist Party Dr Shahadat Hossain on 15 August 2013 at a cake cutting function celebrating former Prime Minister Khaleda Zia's birthday.

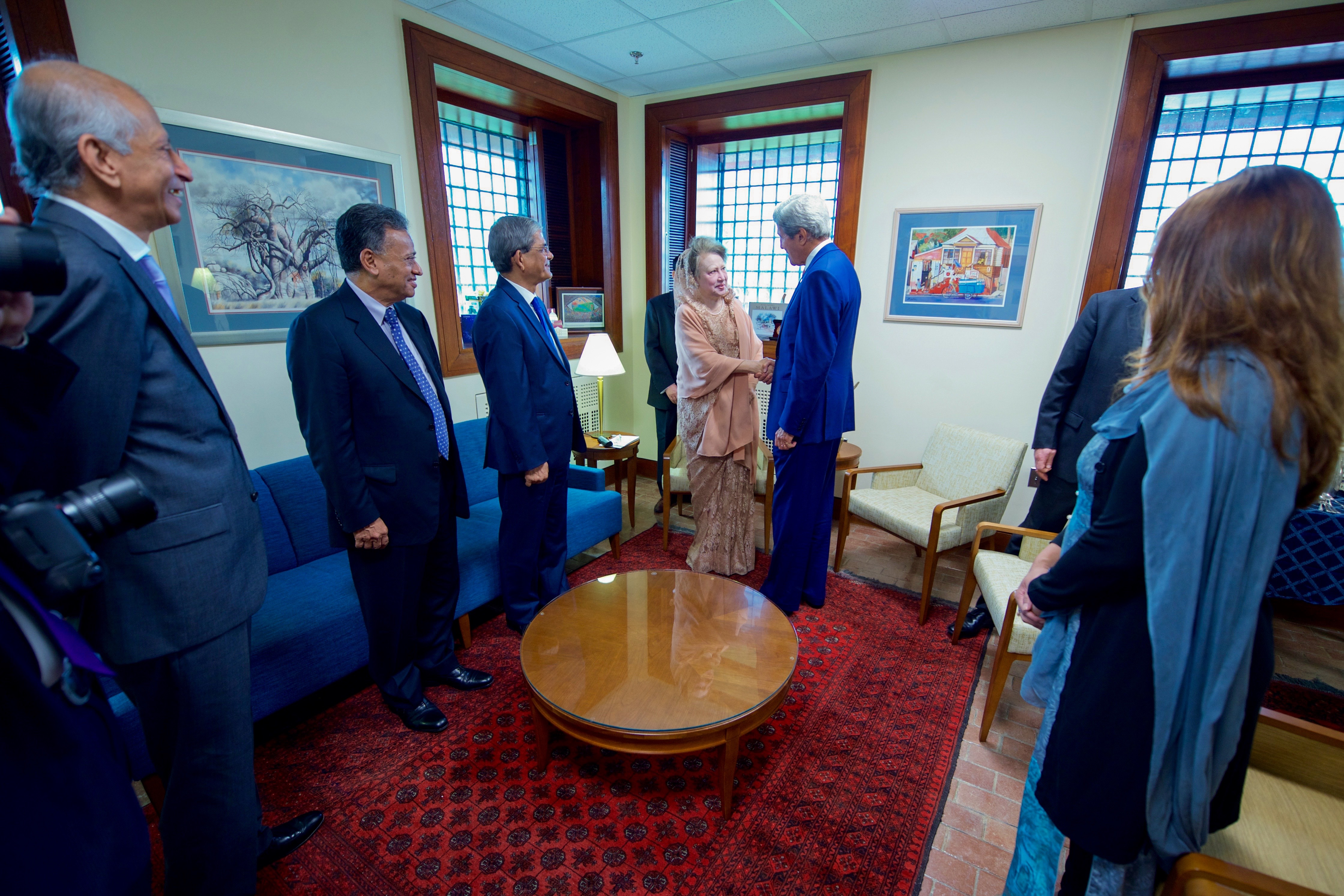
Chowdhury part of a delegation led by former Prime Minister Khaleda Zia that met US Secretary of State John Kerry.

On 23 June 2014, Chowdhury criticized the government for various loan scams at a conference of Bangladesh Economists Forum.

Chowdhury was the chief of BNP's Chittagong city unit in 2015. He announced in March 2015 that he will not contest in the upcoming mayoral elections of the Chittagong City Corporation.

Chowdhury has served as an adviser to Khaleda Zia, the chairperson of Bangladesh Nationalist Party. He met William Todd, the Principal Principal Deputy Assistant Secretary of Bureau of South and Central Asian Affairs at the State Department of the United States, at the residence of the Ambassador of the United States to Bangladesh, Marcia Bernicat on 16 May 2016.

In 2017, Chowdhury was a Standing Committee member of the Bangladesh Nationalist Party. He spoke against the arrest of former Prime Minister Khaleda Zia and claimed the rule of law was absent in Bangladesh. Chowdhury asked the government to make a clear stand in regards to the Rohingya refugees in Bangladesh in September 2017.

The Anti-Corruption Commission issued summons against Chowdhury to interrogate him on corruption charges on 16 August 2018. Chowdhury filed a petition with the Bangladesh High Court, on 3 September 2018, challenging it's order from the Anti-Corruption Commission as not being valid. A Bangladesh High Court bench refused to hear the appeal while another bench, composed of Justice Borhanuddin and Justice Md Mostafizur Rahman, dropped the appeal from their schedule without any explanations on 5 October. The day before the commission had placed a travel ban on him and his wife.

On 16 September 2018, Justice Md Nazrul Islam Talukder and Justice KM Hafizul Alam of the High Court Bench rejected his petition challenging the summons by the Anti-Corruption Commission. Justice M Imman Ali of the Appellate Division of Bangladesh Supreme Court set 1 October 2021 as the hearing date on his petition against the High Court Division verdict on the summons. The Supreme Court bench upheld the order issued by the High Court.

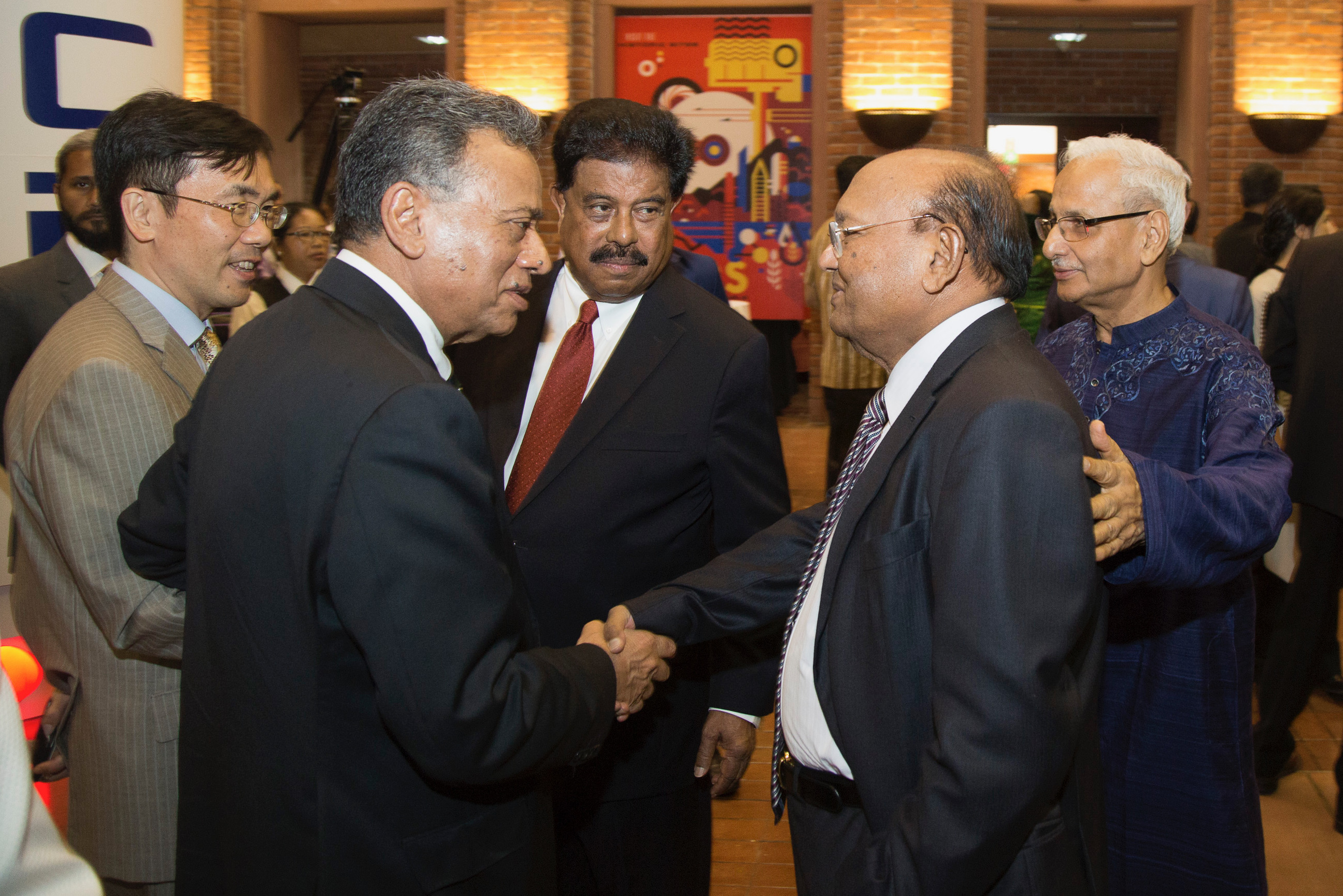
Chowdhury with Tofail Ahmed and Badiul Alam Majumdar at the Embassy of the United States, Dhaka

On 24 August 2018, Chowdhury secured anticipatory bails from the High Court Division in two cases, one alleged that he "provoked" the 2018 Bangladesh road-safety protests and the second stemmed from a leaked cellphone conversation between him and a leader of Jatiyatabadi Chhatra Dal (Mizanur Rahman Naomi who was later arrested), the student front of Bangladesh Nationalist Party. The General Secretary of Chittagong City unit of Bangladesh Chhatra League, Jakaria Dastagir, filed the case against Chowdhury under the Section 57 of Information and Communication Technology Act for the phone conversation leak. Chowdhury was sent to Chittagong jail on 22 October after his request for an extension of bail was denied. He was taken on remand on 26 October by the Chattogram Metropolitan Police. On 4 November 2018, Chowdhury received his bail and 12 November he was released from Chittagong Jail.

On 18 December 2018, a couple of weeks before the election, Chowdhury alleged that the website of Bangladesh Nationalist Party, www.bnpbangladesh.com, was blocked in Bangladesh by the government. He had been nominated by Bangladesh Nationalist Party to contest the election from Chittagong-11 in the 2018 national elections. He lost to M Abdul Latif of Awami League, who received 283,169 votes while Chowdhury had received 52,898 votes.

Chowdhury criticized the 2019-2020 national budget of Bangladesh for a 1.45 trillion deficit and said the budget would increase the sufferings of regular people who would have to pay more revenue to the government. He complained to the Election Commission over irregularities in the two Dhaka city corporation elections in February 2020. He had also spoken against the usage of Electronic Voting Machine in the election.

Chowdhury criticized the 2020-2021 budget for ignoring people and their livelihoods. On 23 December 2021, Chittagong Police pressed charges against Chowdhury over the 2018 cases against him regarding the student protests and leaked phone call.
