= Mohammad Sekander Hossain Miah =

Bangladeshi politician

Member of Bangladesh Parliament

Personal details
- Party: Jatiya Party (Ershad)

Mohammad Sekander Hossain Miah is a Jatiya Party (Ershad) politician and a former member of parliament for Chittagong-9.

== Career ==
Mohammad Sekander Hossain Miah was elected to parliament from Chittagong-9 as a Jatiya Party candidate in 1986 and 1988.
