= Kansat Palli Bidyut protests =

The Kansat Palli Bidyut protests were a series of protest in Kansat against the Kansat Palli Bidyut Samity which are subsidiaries of Rural Electrification Board that resulted in 13 deaths. The protests ranged from January to April 2006.

== History ==
=== Background ===
Kansat is located in Shibganj Upazila, Chapai Nawabganj District, Northern Bangladesh. Palli Bidyut Unnayan Sangram Parishad stands for 'the action committee for rural power development' in Bengali. It was created to demand reliable supply of electricity for the locality. According to the Parsihad, the local Palli Bidyut Samity was illegally taking extra money with the electricity bills. The protests were led by farmers who were frustrated by the lack of proper electricity supply hampering their harvest.

== Incident ==
On 4 January 2006, two people were killed in the protests and on 23 January 2006, eight more were killed in protests in Kansat. They had died after police fired at a protest in Kansat Bazar. Bangladesh Police arrested leaders of Palli Bidyut Unnayan Sangram Parishad, Golam Rabbani, Zahir Chowdhury, and Manirul Islam Manna. More than a hundred were injured and six police vehicles damaged in the clashes

On 7 April saw clashes breakout between protestors and Bangladesh Police supported by activists of Bangladesh Nationalist Party. Security forces were deployed to protect Kansat Palli Bidyut Samity. Mizanur Rahman Minu blamed Bikalpa Dhara Bangladesh and Shahjahan Miah blamed Awami League.

On 8 April 2006, protestors attacked members of the police injuring an superintendent of police Mahbubul Alam and nine others. They also damaged three police vehicles. According to importers 5 thousand tonne of onions were rotting at the Sonamasjid Land Port. Bangladesh Nationalist Party politician Mahbubul Alam, president of Krishak Dal Upazila unit, was killed in the protests and his family members filed a case against Golam Robbani and others. Mizanur Rahman Minu called activists of Kansat Palli Bidyut Unnayan Sangram terrorists.

On 9 April 2006, Section 144 was imposed in the area. Bangladesh High Court sought an explanation over the police firing that resulted in 10 casualties following a petition represented by Dr Kamal Hossain. Armed Police Battalion members were deployed. All activities were stopped at the Sonamasjid Land Port connecting India and Bangladesh.

On 10 April 2006, protests continued in Kansat along with frequent clashes with the police. Shops in the area were forcefully closed by the police who also assaulted one of the shopkeepers. Golam Robbani blamed the local Member of Parliament for directing the police action and the ensuing violence. Bangladesh Rifles were also deployed in the area to control the protests. The local administration declared curfew under section 144.

Convenor of Kansat Palli Bidyut Unnayan Sangram, Golam Robbani, blamed Bangladesh Nationalist Party politician Mizanur Rahman Minu and Shahjahan Miah for the violence during the protest which resulted in 13 deaths. He also said he feared for his life after he heard credible information that a local Member of Parliament sought to have him killed extrajudicially through using law enforcement.

== Aftermath ==
A three-member committee was formed to create a list of individuals injured in the protest in May 2006. The committee was composed of convener Golam Rabbani, Upazila Nirbahi Officer Dewan Mohammad Abdus Samad, and Chapai Nawabganj District civil surgeon Md Golam Mortuza. Victims received free treatment from Bangladesh Rehabilitation Centre for Trauma Victims. The previous Shibganj Upazila Nirbahi Officer Md Rafiqul Islam was withdrawn in February following the death of 10 protestors.

Md. Golam Rabbani, who had served as Convenor of Kansat Palli Bidyut Unnayan Sangram, announced on 18 August 2006 he intended to contest the upcoming parliamentary elections. He stated that the kansat movement had achieved its aims and was a successful movement. Jama'atul Mujahideen Bangladesh claimed in 2009 that they participated in the protests and had contact with a leader of the Kansat Palli Bidyut Unnayan Sangram. Robbani's house was burned down by Bangladesh Nationalist Party activists in December 2013. He was elected to Parliament in the 10th parliamentary election in 2014 from Chapai Nawabganj-1 as a candidate of Awami League.

== Popular culture ==
Tareque Masud and Catherine Masud made a documentary on the incident called The Road to Kansat based on the protests.

== See also ==
- Banshkhali power plant movement
