= Shahbajpur Union =

Shahbajpur Union শাহবাজপুর ইউনিয়ন
- Union
- Location in Bangladesh
- Coordinates: 24°48.1′N 88°7.8′E
- Country: Bangladesh
- Division: Rajshahi Division
- District: Nawabganj District

Area
  - Total: 38.1 km^{2} (14.70 sq mi)

Population (2011)
  - Total: 48,518
  - Density: 1,274/km^{2} (3,301/sq mi)
- Time zone: UTC+6 (BST)
- Website: Official Map of Shahbajpur Union

Shahbajpur (Bengali: শাহবাজপুর ইউনিয়ন) is a union parishad under Shibganj Upazila, Chapai Nawabganj District in the Rajshahi Division of north-western Bangladesh.

== Geography ==
Shahbajpur Union is located at 24.8013°N 88.1303°E. It has 20,871 households and a total area 38.1 km^{2}.

== Demographics ==
According to the 2011 Bangladesh census, Shahbajpur Union had a population of 48,518. This comprised 20,227 males and 28,291 females, with males constituting 46.65% of the population, and females 53.35%. Nabinagar has an average literacy rate of 43.60%, comprising 42.80% among males and 44.30% among females.

== Notable people ==
- Muhammad Enamul Huq [Chandpur] (born 1947), brigadier general, former MP and state minister

== See also ==
- Upazilas of Bangladesh
- Districts of Bangladesh
- Divisions of Bangladesh
