= Chapai Nawabganj-1 =

Constituency of Bangladesh's Jatiya Sangsad

Coordinates: 24.68°N 88.16°E

- Constituency for the Jatiya Sangsad
- District: Chapai Nawabganj District
- Division: Rajshahi Division
- Electorate: 500,181 (2026)

Current constituency
- Created: 1984
- Party: Bangladesh Jamaat-e-Islami
- Member: Md. Keramat Ali
- ← 42 Bogra-7 44 Chapai Nawabganj-2 →

Chapai Nawabganj-1 is a constituency represented in the Jatiya Sangsad (National Parliament) of Bangladesh. since 2026 by Md. Keramat Ali of the Bangladesh Jamaat-e-Islami.

== Boundaries ==
The constituency encompasses Shibganj Upazila.

== History ==
The constituency was created in 1984 from the Rajshahi-1 constituency when the former Rajshahi District was split into four districts: Nawabganj, Naogaon, Rajshahi, and Natore.

== Members of Parliament ==
Election	Member	Party
1986	Moin Uddin Ahmed	Independent
1988	Mahbubul Alam	Independent
1991	Shahjahan Miah	Bangladesh Nationalist Party
1996	Shahjahan Miah	Bangladesh Nationalist Party
2001	Shahjahan Miah	Bangladesh Nationalist Party
2008	Muhammad Enamul Huq	Awami League
2014	Golam Rabbani	Awami League
2018	Shamil Uddin Ahmed Shimul	Awami League
2026	Md. Keramat Ali	Bangladesh Jamaat-e-Islami

== Elections ==
=== Elections in the 2020s ===
General election 2026: Chapai Nawabganj-1
Party	Candidate	Votes	%	±%
BNP	Md. Shahjahan Mia			
Jamaat	Md. Karamot Ali			
IAB	Md. Monirul Islam Moniur			
JP(E)	Md. Afzal Hossen			
BSM	Md. Abdul Halim			
BIF	Nobab Md. Shamsul Hoda			
Majority				
Turnout				

=== Elections in the 2010s ===
General Election 2018: Chapai Nawabganj-1
Party	Candidate	Votes	%	±%
AL	Shamil Uddin Ahmed Shimul	180,078		N/A
BNP	Shahjahan Miah	163,650		N/A
IAB	Md. Monirul Islam	53,154		N/A
Majority				
Turnout		416,132		
AL hold				

Golam Rabbani was elected unopposed in the 2014 general election after opposition parties withdrew their candidacies in a boycott of the election.

=== Elections in the 2000s ===
General Election 2008: Chapai Nawabganj-1
Party	Candidate	Votes	%	±%
AL	Muhammad Enamul Huq	139,308	45.5	+11.4
BNP	Shahjahan Miah	116,673	38.1	−0.8
Gano Forum	Golam Rabbani	49,896	16.3	N/A
Majority		22,635	7.4	+2.6
Turnout		305,877	92.8	+3.1
AL gain from BNP				

General Election 2001: Chapai Nawabganj-1
Party	Candidate	Votes	%	±%
BNP	Shahjahan Miah	96,740	38.9	−7.5
AL	Muhammad Enamul Huq	84,807	34.1	+19.4
Independent	Nazrul Islam	65,310	26.2	N/A
IJOF	Md. Alauddin	1,214	0.5	N/A
Independent	Ittehad Touhidul Idrisi	510	0.2	N/A
CPB	Syed Ahmmad Biswas	306	0.1	N/A
Gano Azadi League (Samad)	Md. Nazrul Islam	108	0.0	N/A
Majority		11,933	4.8	−4.7
Turnout		248,995	89.7	+3.6
BNP hold				

=== Elections in the 1990s ===
General Election June 1996: Chapai Nawabganj-1
Party	Candidate	Votes	%	±%
BNP	Shahjahan Miah	93,119	46.4	+8.9
Jamaat	Nazrul Islam	74,144	36.9	−0.9
AL	Kaium Reza Chowdhury	29,568	14.7	N/A
JP(E)	Mainul Haque	1,317	0.7	+0.4
JSD	Abu Bakkar	1,149	0.6	N/A
Zaker Party	Niamot Ali Niam	1,049	0.5	−0.4
GAL	Md. Nazrul Islam	255	0.1	N/A
FP	Md. Khademul Islam	129	0.1	−0.7
Majority		18,975	9.5	+8.0
Turnout		200,730	86.1	+9.2
BNP hold				

General Election 1991: Chapai Nawabganj-1
Party	Candidate	Votes	%	±%
BNP	Shahjahan Miah	65,560	37.5	
Jamaat	Nazrul Islam	62,945	36.0	
Independent	Kaium Reza Chowdhury	41,201	23.6	
NAP (Muzaffar)	Nazrul Islam	1,593	0.9	
Zaker Party	Mamtazuddin	1,559	0.9	
FP	Md. Khademul Islam	1,338	0.8	
JP(E)	Mainul Haq	586	0.3	
Independent	Mostafizur Rahman	147	0.1	
Majority		2,615	1.5	
Turnout		174,929	76.9	
BNP gain from				
