= Jaminpur =

Village in Rajshahi Division, Bangladesh

Coordinates: 24.7672°N 88.0738°E

Jaminpur is a village under Binodpur Union of Shibganj Upazila, Chapai Nawabganj District in western Bangladesh. It is 7 kilometres (4.3 mi) from Monakasha, and near the border with India.

Jaminpur has one primary school and a dakhil madrasa. There is no high school in the village.

== See also ==
- List of villages in Bangladesh
