= Kansat Union =

Kansat Union কানসাট ইউনিয়ন
- Union
- Location in Bangladesh
- Coordinates: 24°41′N 88°10′E
- Country: Bangladesh
- Division: Rajshahi Division
- District: Nawabganj District
- Upazila: Shibganj Upazila

Government
  - Chairman: Md Sefaul Mulk

Area
  - Total: 8.664 km^{2} (3.345 sq mi)

Population (2011)
  - Total: 34,194
  - Density: 3,947/km^{2} (10,220/sq mi)
- Time zone: UTC+6 (BST)
- Postal code: 6341
- Website: kansatup.chapainawabganj.gov.bd

Kansat (Bengali: কানসাট ইউনিয়ন) is a union parishad under Shibganj Upazila, Chapai Nawabganj District in the Rajshahi Division of north-western Bangladesh.

== History ==
Kansat village was turned into a union in 1928. Now Kansat is developed in education, culture, sports etc.

== Demographic ==
According to the 2011 Bangladesh census, Kansat Union had a population of 34,194. Kansat has an average literacy rate of 61.5%.

== Administration ==
Kansat Union is divided in 16 wards and 20 villages.

The villages are:

1. Kansat
2. Biswanathpur
3. Shibnagar
4. Pukuria
5. Shibnarawanpur
6. Shibnagar Jaigirgram
7. Mohonbag
8. Kolkolia
9. Gobinpur
10. Kansat Bohalabari
11. Baluchor
12. Sahanbadha
13. Shibnagar Monnapara
14. Raghobpur
15. Selimabade
16. Horipur
17. Shibnagar Kaithapar
18. Chalhoripur
19. Perkansat
20. Baghdurgapur

== Education ==
There are two college, two high school, 2 madrasha, 12 govt primary school in Kansat Union.

== Transport ==
The major transport systems inside the union is the bike, rickshaws, bi-cycle and CNG rickshaws. And major transport system to different places is Bus. There is no railway line in this union.

== Notable people ==
- Md. Golam Rabbani Mridha (born 1958), leader of the Kansat Palli Bidyut protests
