= Saimum Parvez =

Bangladeshi politician

Md Saimum Parvez
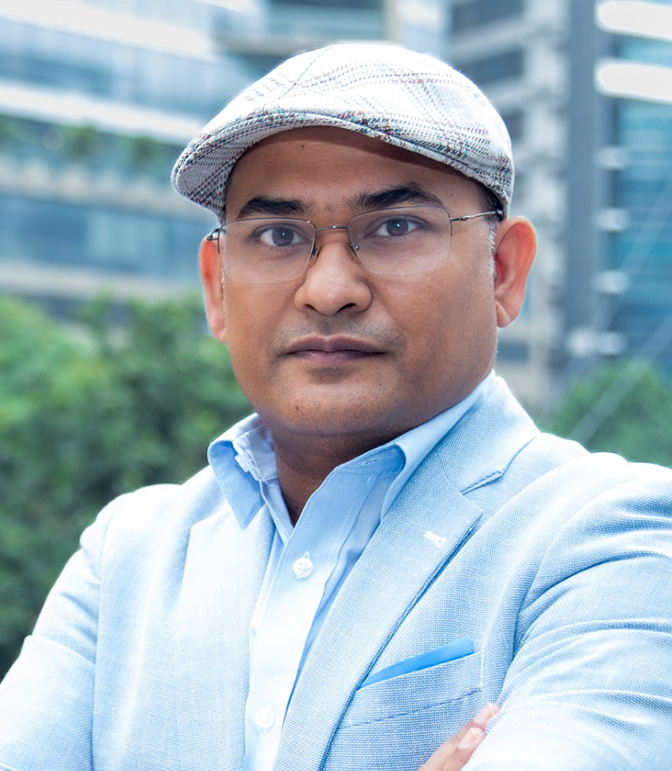

Special Assistant to the Prime Minister of Bangladesh for Environment, Forests, and Climate Change
- Prime Minister: Tarique Rahman
- Preceded by: Position Created

Personal details
- Born: 21 December 1981 (age 44) Shibganj, Bangladesh
- Party: Bangladesh Nationalist Party

Md. Saimum Parvez is a Bangladeshi researcher, academic, and politician serving as the Special Assistant to the Prime Minister of Bangladesh for Environment, Forests, and Climate Change. Parvez held the position of Associate Professor and Senior Researcher at the MF Norwegian School of Theology, Religion and Society prior to becoming a special assistant to the Prime Minister in April 2026.

Parvez is known for his research on international relations, political communication, digital media, terrorism, and environmental policy, primarily in Bangladesh. He served as the special assistant to the BNP Chairman's Foreign Affairs Advisory Committee. He was made a member of the BNP's election steering committee before the 2026 election.

Dr Parvez was part of the Bangladesh delegation at the 64th Sessions of the UNFCCC Subsidiary Bodies (SB64) in June 2026 where he stressed the need of mobilizing global funds to finance Bangladesh's adaptation measures.

== Education and research ==
Parvez earned a master's in International Relations from University of Dhaka and was a Fulbright Fellow at The George Washington University where he completed his MA in Global Communication. He pursued his PhD at the University of Sydney, where his research focused on Digital Media and the Lifecycle of Bangladeshi Violent Extremists. He received a Commonwealth Fellowship, the Australian Postgraduate Award (APA), and the International Postgraduate Research Scholarship (IPRS) during his PhD. He was a Postdoctoral Fellow at Vrije Universiteit Brussel from 2022 to 2024 and was named a CGS–UNDP Fellow and Young Security Scholar.

His research covered political violence, violent extremism, migration, the politics of terrorism and counterrorism, and the impacts of digital media and governance failures. He co-authored the Routledge Handbook of Contemporary Bangladesh and The Politics of Terrorism and Counterterrorism in Bangladesh.

== Career ==
Parvez started his career in media as a planning editor at Banglavision and later worked at Oxfam International and BBC World Service Trust in different roles. He later became an academic and served as an assistant professor at University of Chittagong and Senior Lecturer at North South University. After his PhD, he moved to Germany where he was a lecturer at University of Bonn and later in DW Akademie. In 2025 he joined as an Associate Professor and Senior Researcher at MF Norwegian School of Theology, Religion and Society.

He became vocal against the authoritarian regime of Sheikh Hasina and termed the regime hybrid in his research and opinion articles. He joined the Bangladesh Nationalist Party in 2024 as a special assistant to the party's chairperson's foreign affairs advisory committee. He was made a member of BNP's election steering committee in January 2026 where he coordinated the content team of the party. After BNP won the election, he was made the Special Assistant to the Prime Minister of Bangladesh for Environment, Forests, and Climate Change.

Parvez was the part of the Bangladesh delegation to the United Nations General Assembly in 2026 where he attended the Fourth CVF Leaders Meeting on Development Reset and Cooperation on September 23 and made the case to prioritise Bangladesh for the Loss and Damage Fund and reiterated Bangladesh's commitment for renewable transition.

== Personal life ==
Parvez hails from a political family. His father is Shahjahan Miah, former member of parliament from Chapainawabganj-1 from BNP.
