= Shibganj Upazila, Chapai Nawabganj =

Upazila in Rajshahi Division, Bangladesh

Shibganj Upazila শিবগঞ্জ
- Upazila
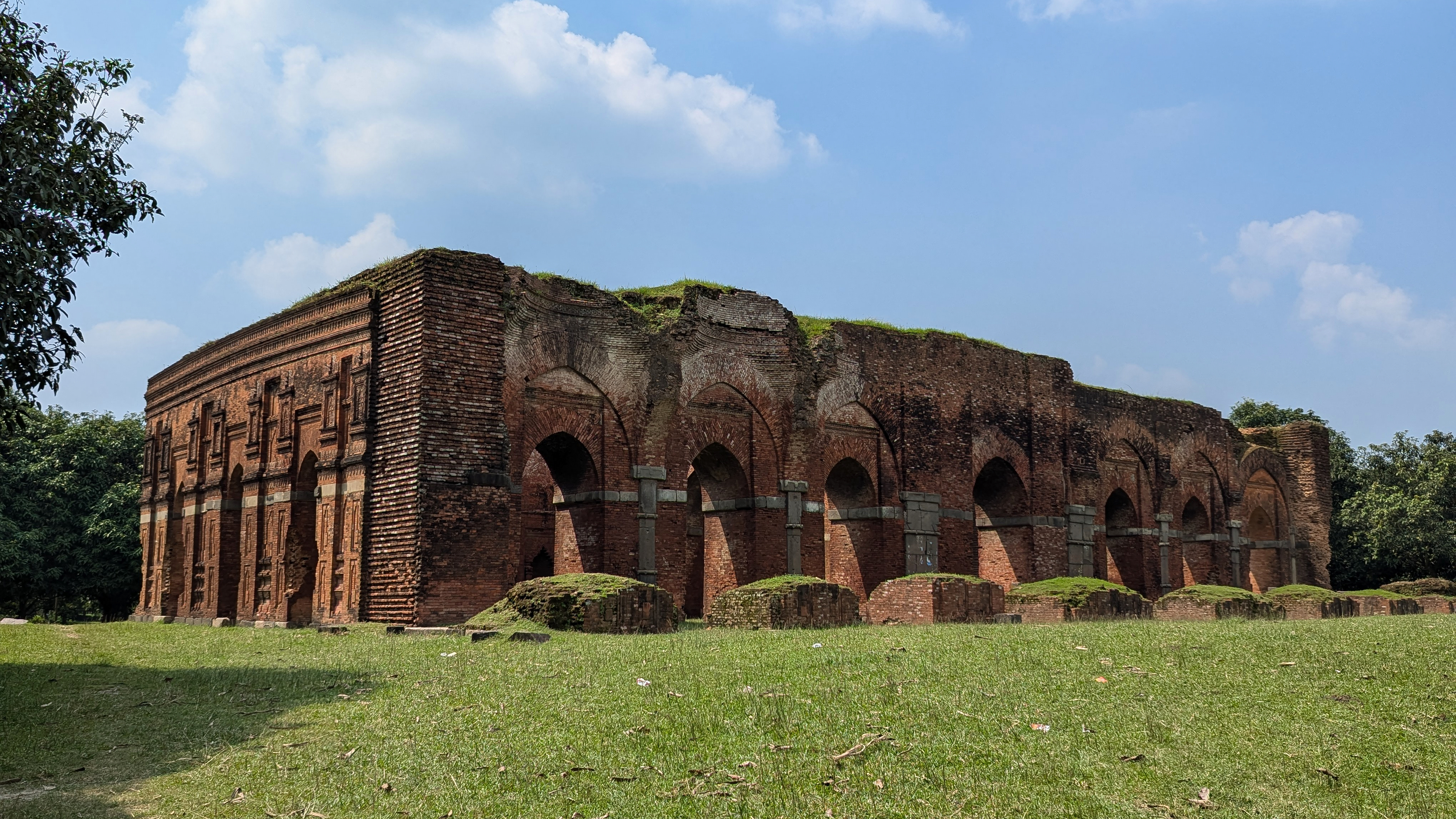
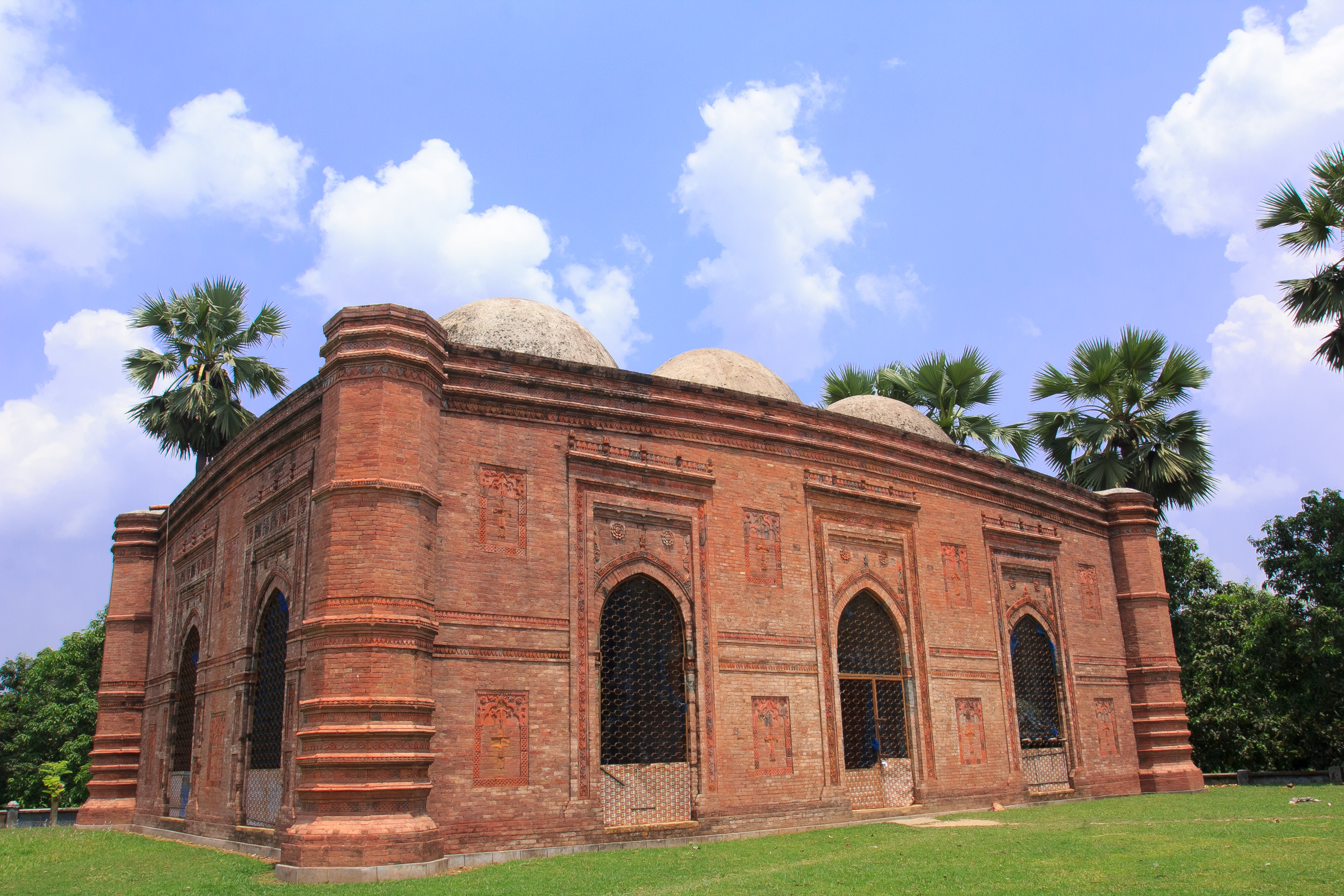
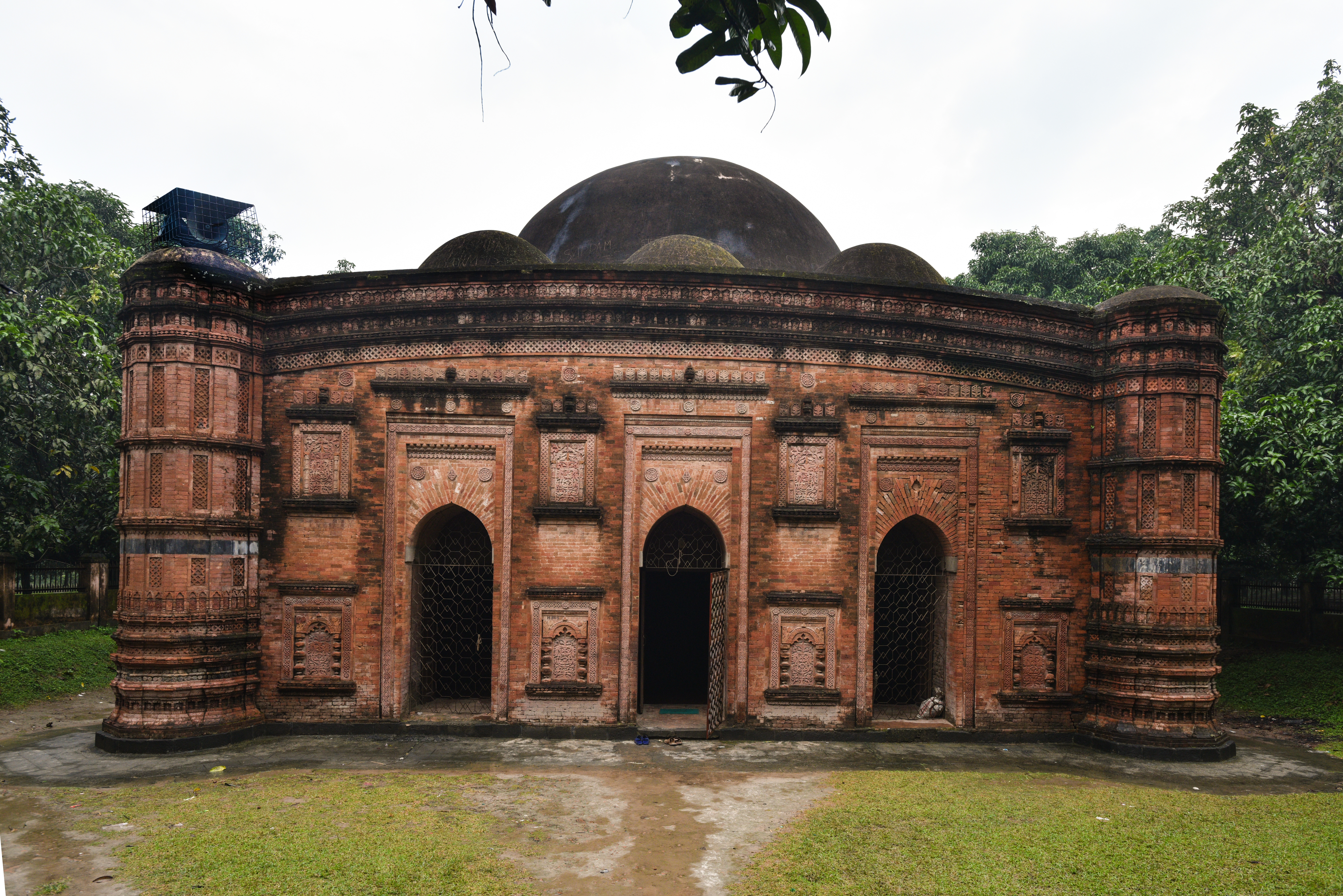
- From top: Darasbari Mosque, Dhania Chalk Mosque, Khania Dighi Mosque

- Coordinates: 24°41′N 88°10′E
- Country: Bangladesh
- Division: Rajshahi
- District: Chapai Nawabganj

Area
  - Total: 525.42 km^{2} (202.87 sq mi)

Population (2022)
  - Total: 666,877
  - Density: 1,269.2/km^{2} (3,287.3/sq mi)
- Demonym: Shibganji
- Time zone: UTC+6 (BST)
- Postal code: 6340
- Area code: 0781
- Website: Official Map of Shibganj

Shibganj (Bengali: শিবগঞ্জ, romanized: Śibgôñj, IPA: [ˈʃibgɔɲdʒ]) is an upazila of Nawabganj District in the Division of Rajshahi, Bangladesh.

== Geography ==
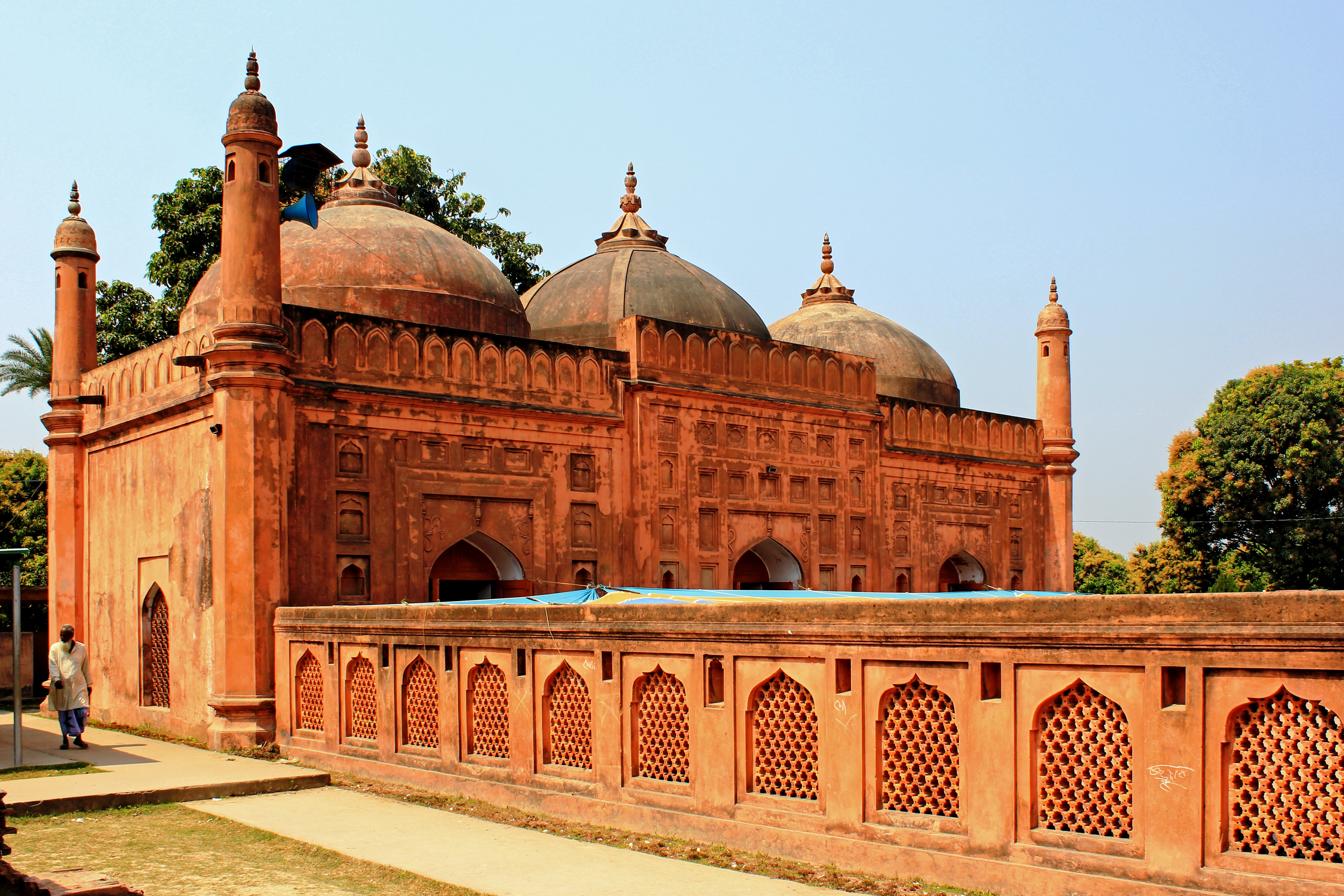
The mosque of Shah Niamatullah, located next to the Mughal Tahakhana pays homage to the Islamic history of this upazila.

Shibganj is located at 24.6833°N 88.1667°E, making it the westernmost upazila of Bangladesh. It has 124,899 households and a total area of 525.42 km^{2}.

There is a land port and border checkpoint on the Bangladesh-India border at Sonamosjid

Shibganj Upazila is bounded by Bholahat Upazila and English Bazar CD Block in Malda district, West Bengal, India on the north, Gomostapur, Nachole and Chapai Nawabganj Sadar Upazilas on the east, Chapai Nawabganj Sadar Upazila and Raghunathganj II CD Block in Murshidabad district, West Bengal, on the south and Kaliachak III CD Block, Malda district, on the west.

== Demographics ==
Religions in Shibganj Upazila (2022)
Religion	Percent
Islam	97.28%
Hinduism	2.72%
Other or not stated	0.00%

According to the 2022 Bangladeshi census, Shibganj Upazila had 158,899 households and a population of 666,877. 10.57% of the population were under 5 years of age. Shibganj had a literacy rate (age 7 and over) of 69.99%: 68.48% for males and 71.42% for females, and a sex ratio of 96.23 males for every 100 females. 90,032 (13.50%) lived in urban areas.

According to the 2011 Census of Bangladesh, Shibganj Upazila had 124,899 households and a population of 591,178. 137,004 (23.17%) were under 10 years of age. Shibganj had a literacy rate (age 7 and over) of 39.38%, compared to the national average of 51.8%, and a sex ratio of 1002 females per 1000 males. 49,833 (8.43%) lived in urban areas.

As of the 1991 Bangladesh census, Shibganj has a population of 422,347. Males constitute 51.25% of the population, and females 48.75%. This upazila's eighteen up population is 203,072. Shibganj has an average literacy rate of 21.1% (7+ years), and the national average of 32.4% literate.

== Administration ==
Shibganj Upazila is divided into Shibganj Municipality and 15 union parishads: Binodpur, Chakkirti, Chhatrajitpur, Daipukuria, Dhainagar, Durlovpur, Ghorapakhia, Kansat, Mobarakpur, Monakasha, Noyalavanga, Panka, Shahbajpur, Shyampur, and Ujirpur. The union parishads are subdivided into 199 mauzas and 407 villages.

Shibganj Municipality is subdivided into 9 wards and 31 mahallas.

Chairman: Vacant

Women Vice Chairman: Vacant

Vice Chairman: Vacant

Upazila Nirbahi Officer (UNO): Irteza Hassan

== Library ==
There is a library named Akimuddin Gronthagar at Jaminpur. It contains a philosophy 'knowledge is entry'. The library was established on 4 May 2008. Within a year it worked very good with the students of science. Akimudin Gronthagar arranged three camps to observe the century's only total Solar eclipse of July 22, 2009. It has more than 500 books and other tools and papers. It has a team led by Jahangir Alam Sur, science writer and enthusiast. The team arranges many program on science.

== Notable people ==
- Khabeeruddin Ahmed (1870–1939), politician
- Idris Ahmed Mia (1894–1966), politician
- Mohammad Mohsin (1931–2004), lawyer and politician
- Ghulam Arieff Tipoo (1931–2024), jurist
- Rafiqun Nabi (born 1943), cartoonist
- Shahjahan Miah (born 1947), former MP
- Brig. General Muhammad Enamul Huq (born 1947), former State Minister of Power
- Muhammad Mizanuddin (born 1953), 22nd Vice-Chancellor of the University of Rajshahi
- Durul Huda (1955–2020), second Mayor of Rajshahi
- Mohammed Aminul Karim Rumi (born 1955), general and military secretary to the president
- Mohammad Yusuf Siddiq (born 1957), historian, epigraphist, researcher, professor and author
- Md. Golam Rabbani Mridha (born 1958), former MP
- Chowdhuries of Monakosha
  - Murtaza Raza Choudhry, former Finance Minister of East Bengal
  - Mainur Reza Choudhury, Chief Justice Supreme Court of Bangladesh
  - Zara Jabeen Mahbub, former MP
- Ahmed family of Monakosha
  - Dr. Moin Uddin Ahmed Montu [Monakosha] (1936–2011), physician and former MP
  - Shamil Uddin Ahmed Shimul (born 1969), former MP
- Mahbubul Alam, former MP
