= Shamil Uddin Ahmed Shimul =

Bangladeshi politician

- সামিল উদ্দিন আহমেদ শিমুল

Member of Parliament for Chapai Nawabganj-1
- In office 3 January 2019 – 6 August 2024
- Preceded by: Md. Golam Rabbani
- Succeeded by: Md. Keramat Ali

Personal details
- Born: 4 January 1969 (age 57) Chapai Nawabganj, East Pakistan, Pakistan
- Party: Bangladesh Awami League
- Occupation: Politician; Orthopedic Surgeon

Shamil Uddin Ahmed Shimul (Bengali: সামিল উদ্দিন আহমেদ শিমুল; born 4 January 1969) is a Bangladesh Awami League politician and a former Jatiya Sangsad member representing the Chapai Nawabganj-1 constituency.

== Early life ==
Ahmed was born on 4 January 1969 to a Bengali Muslim family in Chowdhury Para of Monakosha in Chapai Nawabganj, Rajshahi district, East Pakistan. He was the son of former MP and freedom fighter Dr. Moin Uddin Ahmed (Montu) and grandson of Marhum Kalim Uddin Ahmed. Ahmed holds an MBBS from Rajshahi Medical College.

== Career ==
Ahmed was elected to parliament from Chapai Nawabganj-1 as a Bangladesh Awami League candidate on 30 December 2018.
