= Mohammad Mohsin (disambiguation) =

Mohammad Mohsin (1942–2003) was an Indian director and actor.

Mohammad Mohsin or Muhammad Mohsin may also refer to:

- Muhammad Mohsin (c. 1732–1812), Bengali philanthropist
- Muhammad Mohsin Bekas (1859–1882), Sindhi poet
- Muhammad Mohsin Khan Leghari (born 1963), Pakistani politician
- Mohammad Mohsin (cricketer, born 1993), Pakistani cricketer
- Mohammad Mohsin (American cricketer), American cricketer
- Mohammad Mohsin (Khulna politician), Bangladeshi politician
- Mohammed Mohsin (diplomat) (died 2026), Bangladeshi ambassador to Belgium
- Mohammad Mohsin (Rajshahi politician) (1931–2004)
- Mohammed Mohsin (footballer, born 1963), Bangladeshi football player and coach
- Mohamed Mohsin (footballer, born 1965), Bangladeshi footballer
