= Md. Keramat Ali (Chapai Nawabganj politician) =

Bangladeshi politician

- মো. কেরামত আলী

Member of the Bangladesh Parliament for Chapai Nawabganj-1
- Incumbent
- Assumed office 17 February 2026
- Preceded by: Shamil Uddin Ahmed Shimul

Personal details
- Party: Bangladesh Jamaat-e-Islami

Keramat Ali a politician of the Bangladesh Jamaat-e-Islami and the incumbent Member of Parliament from the Chapai Nawabganj-1 constituency. He secured 2,06,893 votes while his nearest rival BNP candidate Md. Shahjahan Miah received 1,62,515 votes.
