= Banshkhali power plant movement =

The Banshkhali power plant movement was a 2016 protest movement against a Bangladeshi-Chinese consortium's acquisition of agricultural lands, graveyards and homes to build a coal-based power plant in the Banshkhali Upazila of Chittagong, Bangladesh. Clashes between protesters and police officers killed four (according to police) or five people (according to protesters). According to the protesters, four more people went missing after the clash with police.

== Background ==
In February 2016, the Bangladesh Power Development Board signed an agreement to begin purchasing electricity from a consortium of two companies—the Bangladesh-based S. Alam Group of Industries and the China-based Shandong Electric Power Construction Corporation III—in November 2019 (when the consortium's planned coal plant would be operational). Experts warned about the environmental impact of a new coal plant, and protests began on March 19, 2016 (shortly after the agreement was signed).

Protests turned violent in March 2016 when mercenaries hired by the company opened fire on a protest march opposing the power station. Several people were injured. The mercenaries were linked with the governing Bangladesh Awami League and the Power Development Board. Amid the protests, the power board began acquiring land by force with the help of local Bangladesh Awami League leaders.

On April 2, 2016, when the owners and engineers of the coal-based power plant attempted to visit the construction site, protesters swooped down on the officials' motorcade. Police cracked down on the protesters, arresting seven. Angry at the arrests, local residents called for a public gathering on April 4.

Awami League leaders called a meeting at the same place on the same day. Local police invoked a Section 144 law restricting public gatherings in the area. When local residents gathered on April 4 to protest, police opened fire and killed at least five people. It was the largest loss of life in an anti-coal protest since the murder of six people in Jharkhand, India.

=== Agreements ===
On October 31, 2013, the S. Alam Group of Industries was authorised by the Awami League government to build two coal-fired power plants in Chittagong's Banshkhali Upazila despite the lack of an environmental impact assessment. In December, the group (one of Bangladesh's fastest-growing conglomerates) signed an agreement with China-based energy company Shandong Electric Power Construction Corporation III for a coal-based power plant. On February 16, 2016, the government signed an agreement to purchase power from the plant (which has a capacity of 1.22 MW) at ৳6.61 per kilowatt hour.

=== Land acquisition ===
In 2013, the S. Alam Group of Industries (the plant's local owner) began acquiring land from local residents with the help of the governing Awami League. Residents complained that they were not paid appropriate compensation and were forbidden to contact the group's executives.

=== Protection committee ===
A committee to protect habitation and graveyards was formed after the S. Alam Group said it had acquired about 600 acres (240 ha) of land in the area, primarily inhabited by subsistence salt farmers. Former union chairman and local Bangladesh Nationalist Party leader Liakat Ali was nominated to lead a rally to protect agricultural and residential land, mosques, temples and graveyards from the S. Alam Group and compel a public hearing.

== Events ==
Frustration with the overlooking of demands and taking land from local residents without proper compensation culminated on March 11, 2016, when hundreds gathered to protest acts by the S. Alam Group of Industries and the government. During a March 19 rally, local Awami League members fired on the crowd. As the crowd dispersed, it became violent.

Protests continued, and at a March 23 public hearing attended by about 3,000 people assurances were given that their demands would be considered. Despite the public hearing, S. Alam Group of Industries officials continued their work; on April 2, several engineers and a company director visited the project area. Protesters attacked their motorcade and vandalized a CNG-powered auto rickshaw. Charges were filed against local residents, and seven were arrested within 24 hours.

To protest the arrests, a rally was scheduled for April 4 by the "Committee to protect habitation and graveyards". To foil the rally, Awami League members scheduled a meeting for the same date and place and local police invoked a section-144 law banning public gatherings.

On April 4, 2016, about 500 villagers defied the section 144 and began demonstrating against the actions of the police and the government. Police and 30 motorcycles carrying Awami League members arrived and ordered the protesters to leave. When the protesters refused, police and Awami League members began firing on the crowd. Four people died at the scene and two more under medical care.

== Aftermath ==
On April 4, Bangladesh Nationalist Party chief Begum Khaleda Zia issued a statement criticizing the government for the killings and demanded that the government conduct a judicial investigation to identify the culprits and bring them to justice. The Chhatra Oikkya Forum announced a general strike in Banshkhali to protest the deaths and demanded that the power-plant project be moved from the area. During April 5 protest rallies in Chittagong, leaders of the National Committee to Protect Oil, Gas, Mineral Resources, Power and Ports demanded the immediate arrest and prosecution of the killers. According to CoalSwarm co-founder Ted Nace, it was the greatest loss of life since the 2011 Jharkhand anti-coal protest in India. Two committees were formed by the district administration and police to investigate the event. Later supreme court ordered the S Alam to pay a compensation of Tk 5 lac each to the families of the men killed.

== See also ==
- Kansat Palli Bidyut protests
