= Khania Dighi Mosque =

15th-century mosque in Chapainawabganj, Rajshahi, Bangladesh

- খনিয়াদিঘি মসজিদ
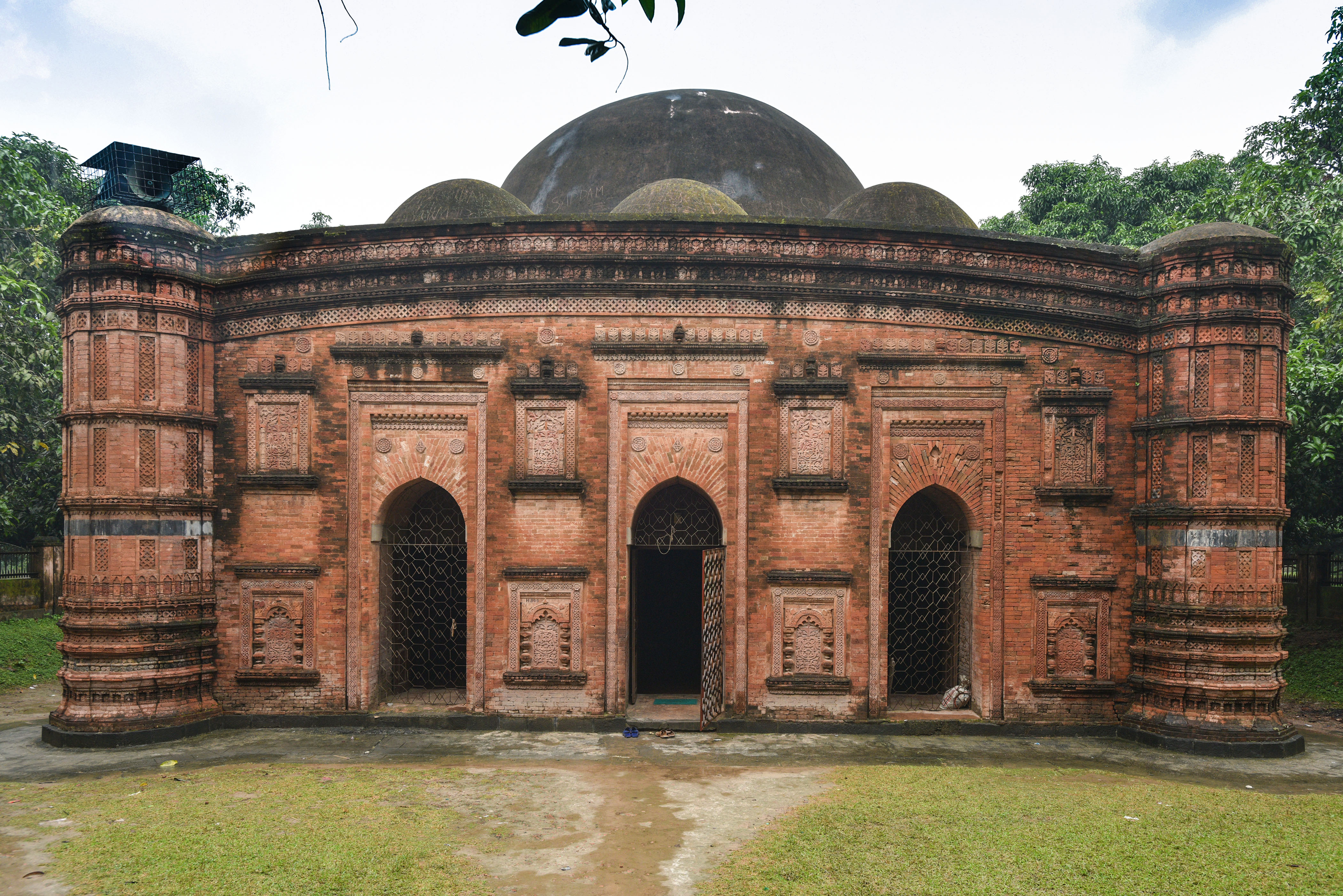

- Location of the mosque in Bangladesh

Religion
- Affiliation: Islam
- Ecclesiastical or organisational status: Mosque
- Status: Active

Location
- Location: Chapai Nawabganj District, Rajshahi Division
- Country: Bangladesh
- Coordinates: 24°50′22″N 88°08′54″E

Architecture
- Type: Mosque architecture
- Style: Bengal Sultanate
- Completed: 1480 CE

Specifications
- Length: 17.78 m (58.3 ft)
- Width: 13.05 m (42.8 ft)
- Interior area: 9 m^{2} (97 sq ft)
- Dome: Four
- Materials: Brick; terracotta; tiles

The Khania Dighi Mosque (Bengali: খনিয়াদিঘি মসজিদ), also known locally as the Chamchika or the Rajbibi mosque, is a mosque located in the Chapai Nawabganj District, in the Rajshahi Division of Bangladesh. Completed in 1480 CE by an unknown noble woman, the mosque is believed to be one of the earliest works of the Gaudas, and is situated near the Choto Sona Mosque.

== History ==
The mosque was established from 1450 to 1565 CE, when Gauda was the capital of Bengal. Beside the mosque there remains a huge pond (also known as dighi in Bengali) named Khania, near which there is another mosque named Darasbari.

== Architecture ==
The area of the mosque is 17.78 by 13.05 metres (58.3 by 42.8 ft). The walls below the dome are square in shape, with each side being 9 metres (30 ft). The big room inside the mosque has a huge verandah on its eastern end, the remnants of which can be seen today. The mosque is made of bricks. The building has been repaired by the Bangladeshi Department of Architecture.

The mosque looks similar to the Chamkatti Mosque located in Malda, West Bengal, India.

== See also ==
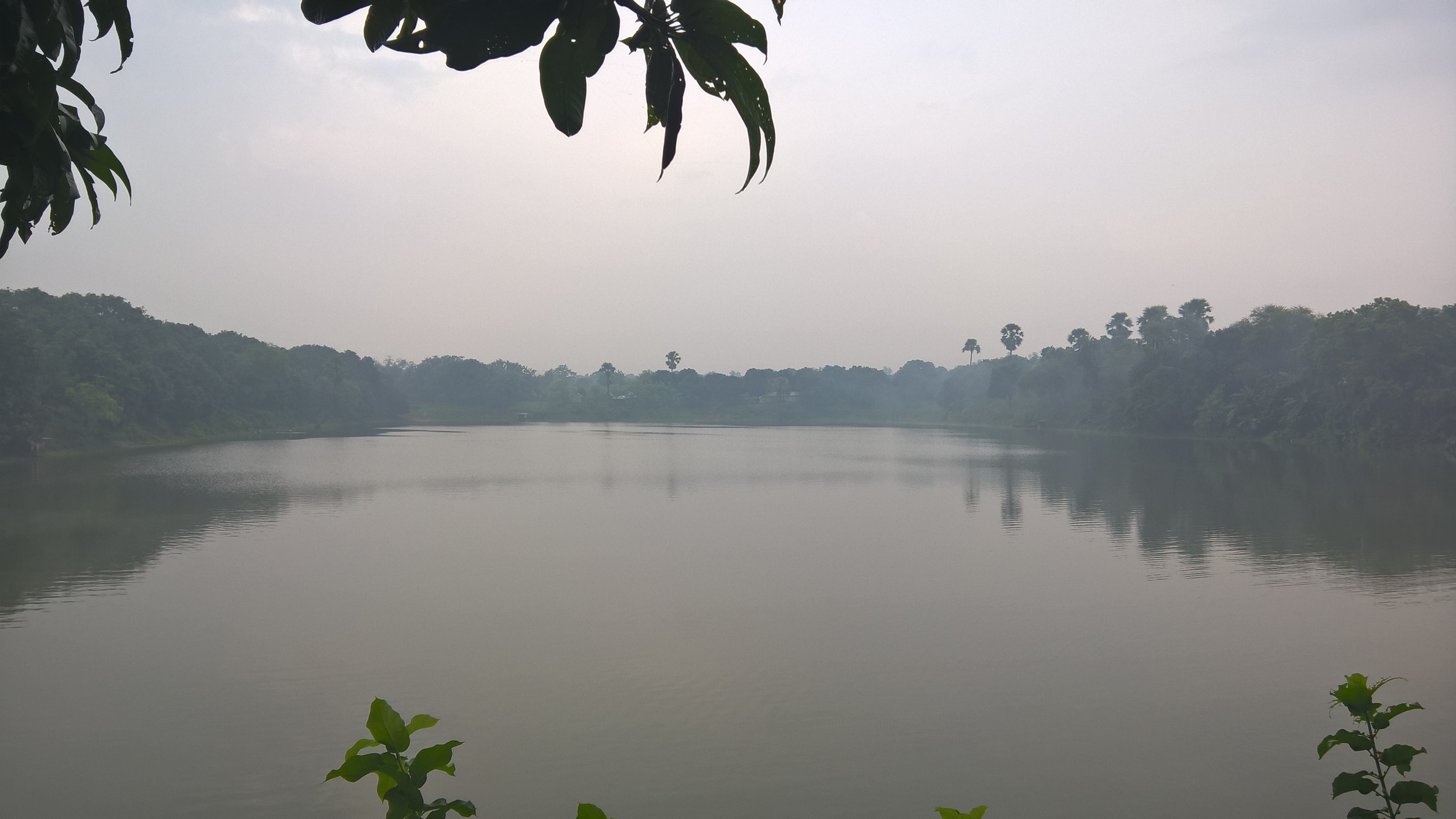
The historical Khania pond

- Islam in Bangladesh
- List of mosques in Bangladesh
