= Mridha =

A mridha (Bengali: মৃধা) is a first class commander of armed men under the employ of a zamindar (landlord) in pre British period, used as security guards, against uncooperative tenants, and against the forces of other zamindars in land disputes. During the mughal era it is considered that a part of Mridha were the elite class archers of mughal archery unit who lived around and within the parts of Dhaka , Tangail, Bikrampur and Pirojpur.

== Notable people ==
Mridha may also be used as a family name. It may refer to:

- Khoda Box Mridha (1945–2010), sports commentator
- Ziaul Haque Mridha (born 1952), politician
- Md. Golam Rabbani Mridha (born 1958), politician
- Abdul Ali Mridha (died 2019), politician
- Sirajul Islam Mridha, politician
- Jonathan Mridha (born 1995), Swedish-Bengali tennis player

== See also ==
- Khan Mohammad Mridha Mosque
