= Mahbubul Alam (politician) =

Bangladeshi Politician

- মাহবুবুল আলম

Member of Bangladesh Parliament
- In office 1988–1990
- Preceded by: Moin Uddin Ahmed
- Succeeded by: Shahjahan Miah

Mahbubul Alam is a Bangladeshi politician in Chapai Nawabganj District. He was elected a member of parliament from Chapai Nawabganj-1 in 1988.

== Career ==
Alam was elected to parliament from Chapai Nawabganj-1 in 1988 Bangladeshi general election.
