= Shahjahan Miah =

Bangladeshi politician

Member of Parliament from Undivided Rajshahi-1
- In office 1979–1982
- Preceded by: Moin Uddin Ahmed
- Succeeded by: Moin Uddin Ahmed

Member of Parliament from Chapai Nawabganj-1
- In office 1991–2006
- Preceded by: Mahbubul Alam
- Succeeded by: Muhammad Enamul Huq

Personal details
- Born: 10 January 1947 (age 79) Shibganj, British India
- Party: Bangladesh Nationalist Party
- Children: Saimum Parvez
- Education: University of Rajshahi

Shahjahan Miah (born 10 January 1947) is a Bangladesh Nationalist Party politician. He was elected a member of parliament from Undivided Rajshahi-1 in 1979 and from Chapai Nawabganj-1 in 1991, 15 February 1996, 12 June 1996 and 2001 Bangladeshi general election. He was a participant in the Liberation War of Bangladesh.

His son Saimum Parvez was appointed as the special assistant to the prime minister of Bangladesh for environment, forests, and climate change by Prime Minister Tarique Rahman in May 2026.

== Early life ==
Shahjahan Miah was born on 10 January 1947 in Shibganj Upazila of Chapai Nawabganj District. His father is Faiz Ahmed Mia and mother Naibor Nessa. He received his bachelor's and master's degree in economics from University of Rajshahi.

== Career ==
Shahjahan Miah is the president of Chapai Nawabganj district BNP. He was elected to parliament from Undivided Rajshahi-1 a Bangladesh Nationalist Party candidate in 1979 Bangladeshi general election. He was elected a member of parliament for Chapai Nawabganj-1 as a Bangladesh Nationalist Party candidate in 1991, 15 February 1996, 12 June 1996 and 2001 Bangladeshi general election.
