= Darasbari Mosque =

Former mosque in Chapainawabganj, Bangladesh

- দারসবাড়ি মসজিদ
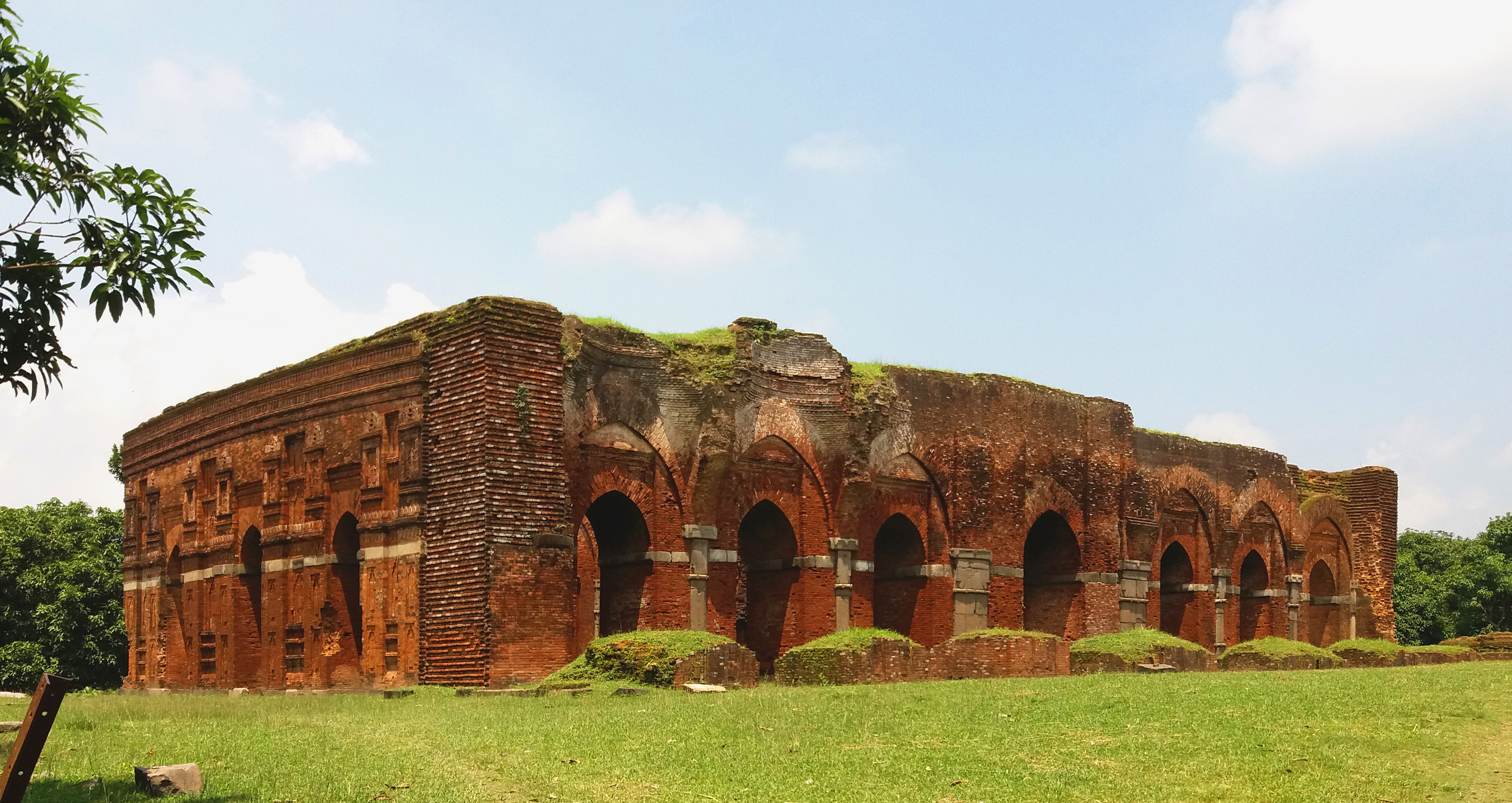
- The former mosque, in 2016

- Location of the former mosque in Bangladesh

Religion
- Affiliation: Islam (former)
- Ecclesiastical or organisational status: Mosque
- Status: Preserved

Location
- Location: Chapainawabganj, Rajshahi Division
- Country: Bangladesh
- Coordinates: 24°49′57″N 88°08′04″E

Architecture
- Type: Mosque architecture
- Style: Bengal Sultanate
- Founder: Shamsuddin Yusuf Shah
- Completed: 1479 CE

Specifications
- Dome: Nine
- Materials: Brick; stone; tiles

The Darasbari Mosque (Bengali: দারসবাড়ি মসজিদ) is an historic former mosque and now architectural monument, located in Shibganj Upazila of Chapai Nawabganj District, in the Rajshahi Division of Bangladesh. Built in 1479 CE, the former mosque is situated approximately one kilometre (zero point six two miles) to the south-west of Kotwali Gate and approximately 500 metres (1,600 ft) to the west of the Choto Sona Mosque.

== History ==
According to an inscription, the former brick mosque was constructed by the restored Iliyas Shahi sultan Shamsuddin Yusuf Shah, son of Barbak Shah in 884 AH. By 2003, the former mosque had no roof and the verandah had fallen down. In size, it is the third largest mosque in the city of Gaur-Lakhnauti, after the Bara Sona Masjid and Guntanta mosques.

== Architecture ==
Externally, the former mosque measures 34 by 20.6 metres (112 by 68 ft) and internally 30.3 by 11.7 metres (99 by 38 ft). It was built of brick, and the pillars are stone.

The roof of the former mosque with verandah and char-chala vaults. The prayer room is accessed from the east by seven pointed-arch openings from the verandah. There are three pointed archways in the southern wall and two in the northern wall. The mosque inscription in Arabic reads:

Allah the most High has said, 'And the places of worship are for Allah [alone], so invoke not anyone along with Allah' [Quran 72]. And the Prophet, peace and blessings of Allah be upon him, has said, 'Whoever builds a mosque for Allah, Allah will build for him a palace in Paradise' [Hadith]. This Jami mosque was built by the great and just Sultan, master of the necks [people] and nations, the Sultan, son of the Sultan, son of the Sultan Shams al-Dunya wal-Din Abul Muzaffar Yusuf Shah the Sultan, son of Barbak Shah the Sultan, son of Mahmud Shah the Sultan, may Allah perpetuate his kingdom and sovereignty, and make his bounty and gift univer-sal, in the Hijri year 884 [1479-80].

Inside the former prayer chamber are the remains of a royal gallery in its north-west corner. The qiblah wall contains totally eleven mihrabs (two of these belong to the royal gallery at the upper level). It was ornamented by terracotta plaques, some of which are visible on the western and southern outer wall surface under the cornice.

== See also ==
- Islam in Bangladesh
- List of mosques in Bangladesh
- List of archaeological sites in Bangladesh

== Bibliography ==
- Hasan, Perween (2007). Sultans and Mosques: The Early Muslim Architecture of Bangladesh. Bloomsbury Academic. ISBN 978-1-84511-381-0.
- Michell, George, ed. (1984). The Islamic Heritage of Bengal. Unesco. ISBN 978-92-3-102174-9.
- Ahmed, Abu Sayeed M. (2006). Mosque Architecture in Bangladesh. Dhaka: UNESCO. p. 102. ISBN 9843234693.
