= Khabeeruddin Ahmed =

Member of Central Legislative Council of British India

- খাবীরুদ্দিন আহমেদ
- Ahmed in 1939

Member of the Central Legislative Assembly
- In office 1920–1939
- Monarch: Edward VIII
- Succeeded by: Shah Abdul Hamid
- Constituency: Rajshahi

Provincial Official of the Central Legislative Assembly
- In office 1920–1923
- Succeeded by: Muhammad Abdul Mumin
- Constituency: Bengal Presidency

Personal details
- Born: 1870 Biswanathpur, Nawabganj, Malda district, Bengal Presidency
- Died: March 1939 (aged 68–69) New Delhi, Bengal Province, British India
- Party: All-India Muslim League
- Education: University of Cambridge

Khabeeruddin Ahmed (also spelled Kabeeruddin, Kabiruddin or K. Ahmed; 1870 – March 1939) was a politician, lawyer, and a member of Central Legislative Assembly of British India. He was a founding member of the all India independent Democratic Party, and later became a leader of the All-India Muslim League.

== Early life and education ==
Ahmed was born in 1870 to a Bengali Muslim family in the village of Biswanathpur in Nawabganj (now in Bangladesh), then part of the Malda district of the Bengal Presidency. He was admitted to the University of Cambridge, and trained as a barrister at the Gray's Inn in London.

== Career ==
Upon his return to British India, he enrolled at the Calcutta High Court, and took an interest in British Indian national politics. In addition, he practiced law at the Federal Court of India when it was established in New Delhi. Khabeeruddin died in New Delhi in March 1939. He was a member of the Central Legislative Assembly until he died.
