= Mohammad Mohsin (Rajshahi politician) =

Bangladeshi politician

Member of Parliament for Rajshahi-11
- In office 24 February 1975 – 6 November 1976
- Preceded by: Mainuddin Ahmed Manik
- Succeeded by: Emran Ali Sarkar

Member of Parliament for Rajshahi-10
- In office 12 February 1982 – 18 February 1979
- Preceded by: Qamaruzzaman
- Succeeded by: Defunct

Personal details
- Born: 21 May 1931 Chapai Nawabganj
- Died: 8 October 2004 (aged 73) Rajshahi
- Party: Bangladesh Awami League
- Other political affiliations: BKSAL

Mohammad Mohsin (Bengali: মোহাম্মদ মোহসীন) (21 May 1931 – 8 October 2004) was a Bangladeshi lawyer, freedom fighter and politician. He was a member of parliament for the Rajshahi-10 and Rajshahi-11 constituencies.

== Early life ==
Mohammad Mohsin was born on 21 May 1931 in Kavirajtola village of Binodpur Union in Shibganj, Chapai Nawabganj, then British India. His father's name is Abdul Aziz and mother's name is Ayana Begum. He passed his matriculation in 1947 from Dadnchok High Madrasa, Shivganj, Chapainawabganj. He received BA from Rajshahi Government College in 1950 and LLB from University of Rajshahi in 1957.

After 1957, he settled in Rajshahi city from Binodpur in Chapainawabganj with his family. Father of three sons and two daughters in personal life.

== Career ==
Mohsin was a lawyer. He was GP (Gov. Pleader) of Greater Rajshahi District from 1972-1976. He taught in Rajshahi Law College for a long time. He served as the founder-president of the governing body of Rajshahi Law College until his death.

He was the director of Sonali Bank.

He was executive member of Rajshahi District National Tuberculosis Association, executive member of Rajshahi Homeopath College, elected senate and syndicate member of Rajshahi University for several times.

== Political life ==
Mohsin was the president of Awami League in Rajshahi for two terms after 1962. He served as the organizing secretary of Rajshahi district Awami League in 1968-1973 and later served as general secretary and president of Rajshahi district Awami League several times.

In the general election of Pakistan in 1970, he was nominated by the Awami League Parliamentary Board as an MNA candidate from Boalia-Paba-Tanor-Godagari area of Rajshahi in the provincial council, but he did not choose for personal reasons.

In 1971, he served as the convener of the Rajshahi Sangram Parishad. During the liberation war in 1971, he served as the in-charge of Panipia camp in Murshidabad, India. Trained about 1000 freedom fighters. He contributed to the liberation war as an organizer.

In the 1975 by-election of the first National Parliament, he was nominated as a member of parliament in the then Rajshahi-11 constituency (Rajshahi Sadar-Boalia-Paba) by Bakshal system.

He was elected to parliament from Rajshahi-10 as a Bangladesh Awami League candidate in 1979.

== Death ==
Mohammad Mohsin died on 8 October 2004.
