= Muhammad Enamul Huq =

Bangladeshi politician

Mohammad Enamul Huq

State Minister for Power, Energy and Mineral Resources
- In office 3 May 2009 – 24 January 2014
- Preceded by: Tapan Chowdhury
- Succeeded by: Nasrul Hamid

Member of Parliament
- In office 2008–2014
- Preceded by: Shahjahan Mia
- Succeeded by: Golam Rabbani
- Constituency: Chapai Nawabganj-1

Personal details
- Born: 10 January 1947 (age 79) Nawabganj, Malda, British India
- Party: Bangladesh Awami League

Military service
- Allegiance: Bangladesh
- Branch/service: Bangladesh Army
- Years of service: 1975-2006
- Rank: Brigadier General
- Unit: Corps of Engineers
- Commands: Commander of 14th Independent Engineers Brigade; Station Commander, Ghatail; Commandant of Engineers Centre and School of Military Engineering
- Battles/wars: Bangladesh Liberation War

Brig. General (Retd) Mohammad Enamul Huq is a Bangladesh Awami League politician. He was State Minister of Power, Energy and Mineral Resources in the Second Hasina Cabinet.

== Early life ==
Huq was born on 10 January 1947 to a Bengali Muslim family in the village of Chandpur in Shahbazpur Union, Nawabganj, Malda district, Bengal Presidency. He was the eldest among the five sons and three daughters of Mohammad Mozahar Hossain and Ferdaus Mahal.

He completed his matriculation from Humayun Reza High School in 1962 and passed his Higher Secondary Certificate (Science Division) from Comilla Victoria College in 1964. Huq earned his Bachelor of Science degree in Electrical Engineering from Bangladesh University of Engineering and Technology in 1968.

== Career ==
Huq served as a commissioned officer in the Bangladesh Army. He retired as a brigadier general. He was elected to parliament from Chapai Nawabganj-1 as a candidate of the Bangladesh Awami League in 2008.
