= Moin Uddin Ahmed =

Bangladeshi politician (1936–2011)

- মইন উদ্দীন আহমদ

Member of Parliament from Undivided Rajshahi-1
- In office 1973–1982
- Preceded by: Start (gain independence)
- Succeeded by: Shahjahan Miah

Member of Parliament from Chapai Nawabganj-1
- In office 1986–1988
- Preceded by: Shahjahan Miah
- Succeeded by: Mahbubul Alam

Personal details
- Born: 1 December 1936 Shibganj, British India
- Died: 2 September 2011 (aged 74)
- Party: Bangladesh Awami League
- Children: Shamil Uddin Ahmed Shimul
- Education: Sir Salimullah Medical College

Moin Uddin Ahmed, known as 'Montu', was a physician and politician. He was elected a member of parliament from undivided Rajshahi-1 in 1973 and from Chapai Nawabganj-1 in 1986. He was an organizer of the Liberation War of Bangladesh.

== Early life ==
Moin Uddin Ahmed was born on 1 November 1936 in Shibganj Upazila of Chapai Nawabganj District. His father is Kalim Uddin Ahmed and mother Begum Del Afroz.

== Career ==
Moin Uddin Ahmed was a physician. He was an organizer of the Liberation War of Bangladesh. He is the former president of Chapainawabganj district Awami League. He was elected to parliament from undivided Rajshahi-1 a Bangladesh Awami League candidate in the 1973 Bangladeshi general election. He was elected a member of parliament from Chapai Nawabganj-1 as an independent candidate in the 1986 Bangladeshi general election.

== Death ==
Moin Uddin Ahmed died on 2 September 2011.
