= Md. Golam Rabbani =

Bangladeshi politician

Member of Parliament

Personal details
- Party: Bangladesh Awami League

Mohammad Golam Rabbani (Bengali: মোহাঃ গোলাম রাব্বানী) is a Bangladesh Awami League politician and former Member of Parliament from Chapai Nawabganj-1.

== Early life ==
Golam Rabbani was born on 1 April 1958 to a Bengali family of Muslim Mridhas in the village of Pukuria in Kansat, Nawabganj, Rajshahi district, East Bengal. He was the second among the six sons of Belayet Ali Mridha and Mansura Begum. He received his Secondary School Certificate from Kansat High School in 1973 and Higher Secondary Certificate from New Government Degree College, Rajshahi in 1975. He graduated with a Bachelor of Arts in psychology from Rajshahi College in 1985.

== Career ==
Rabbani was a leader of the Kansat Palli Bidyut protests in 2006.

Rabbani was elected to Parliament on 5 January 2014 from Chapai Nawabganj-1 as a Bangladesh Awami League candidate.
