= Chapai Nawabganj District =

Chapainawabganj District চাঁপাইনবাবগঞ্জ জেলা Gauḍa
- District of Bangladesh
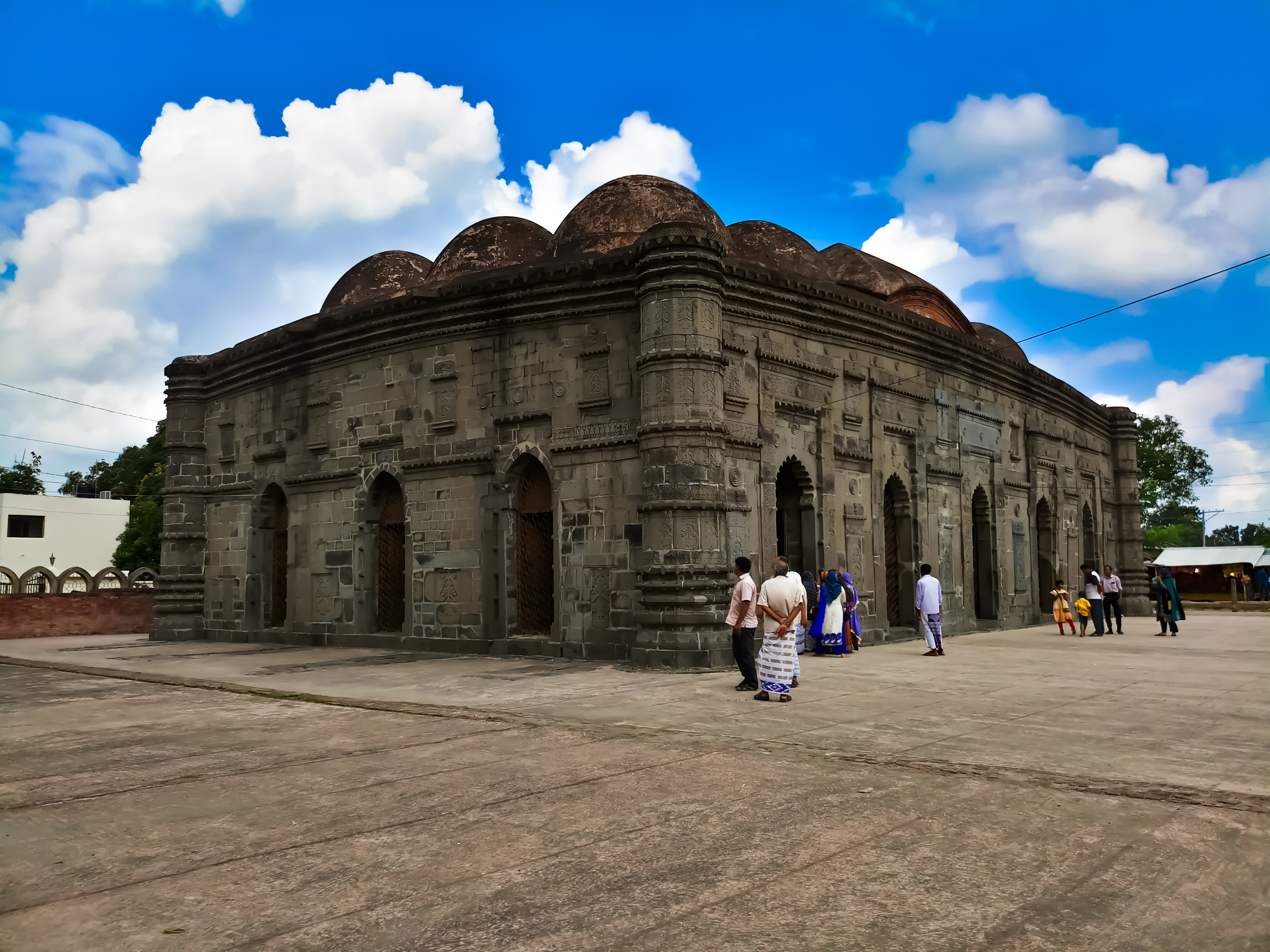
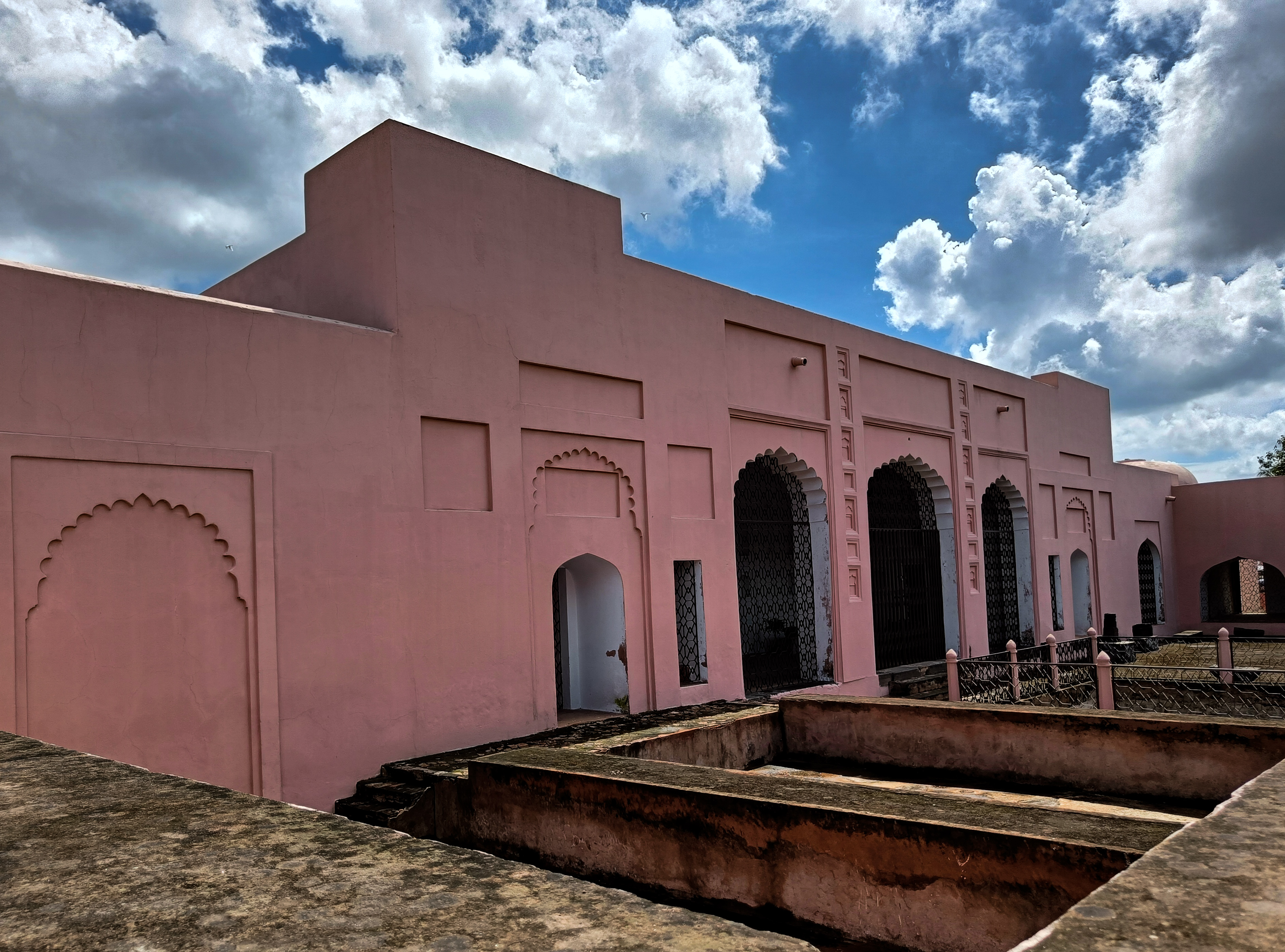
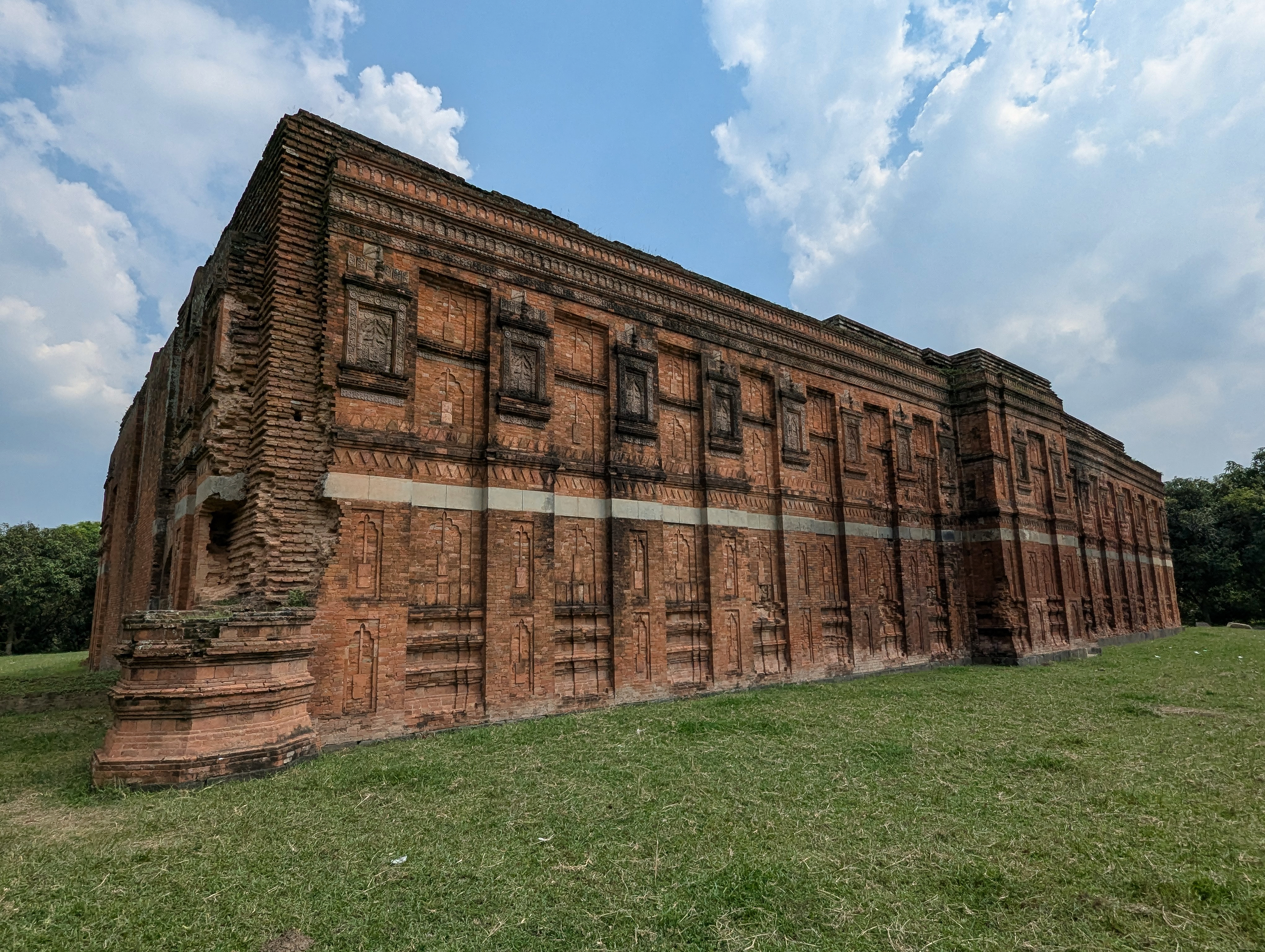
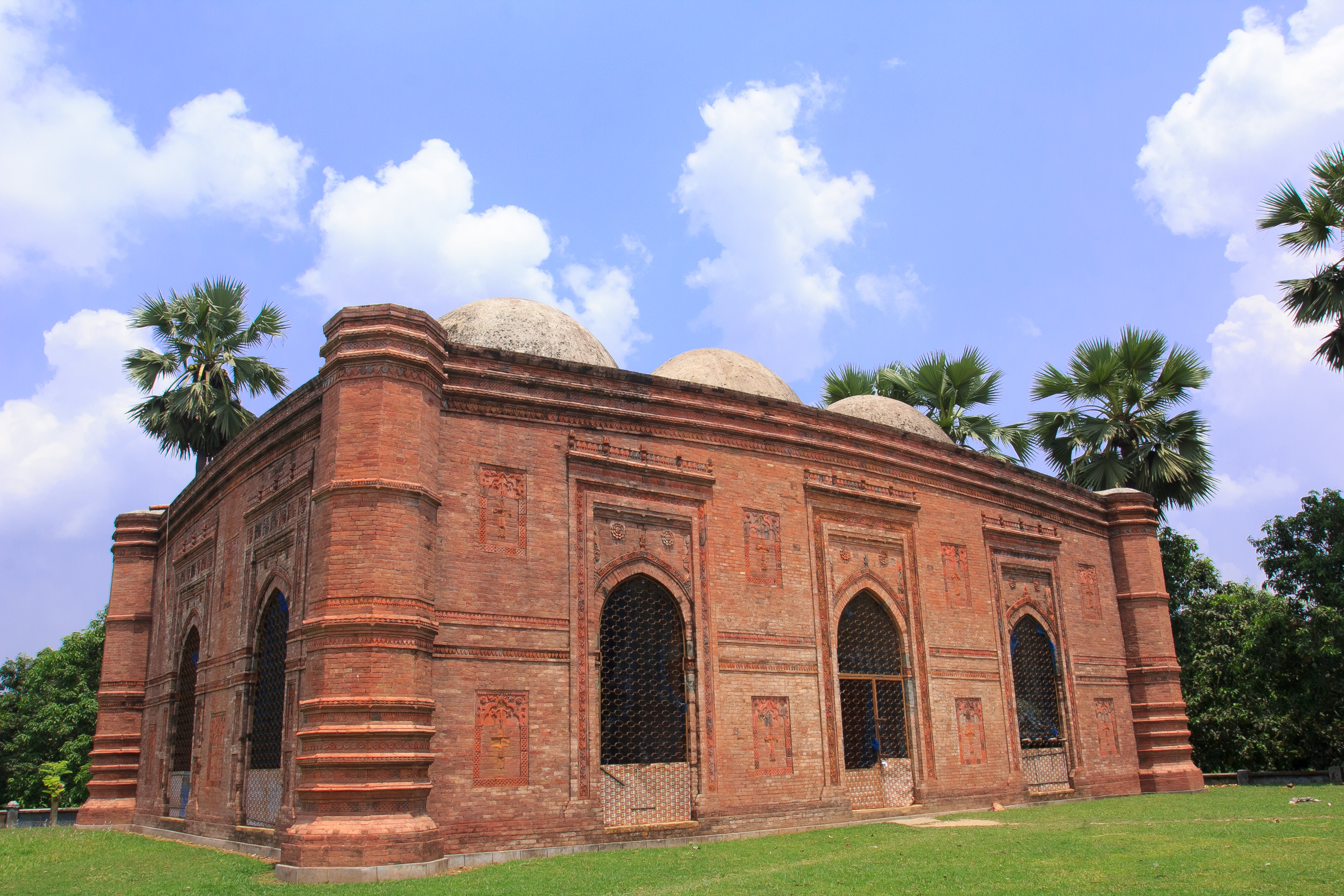
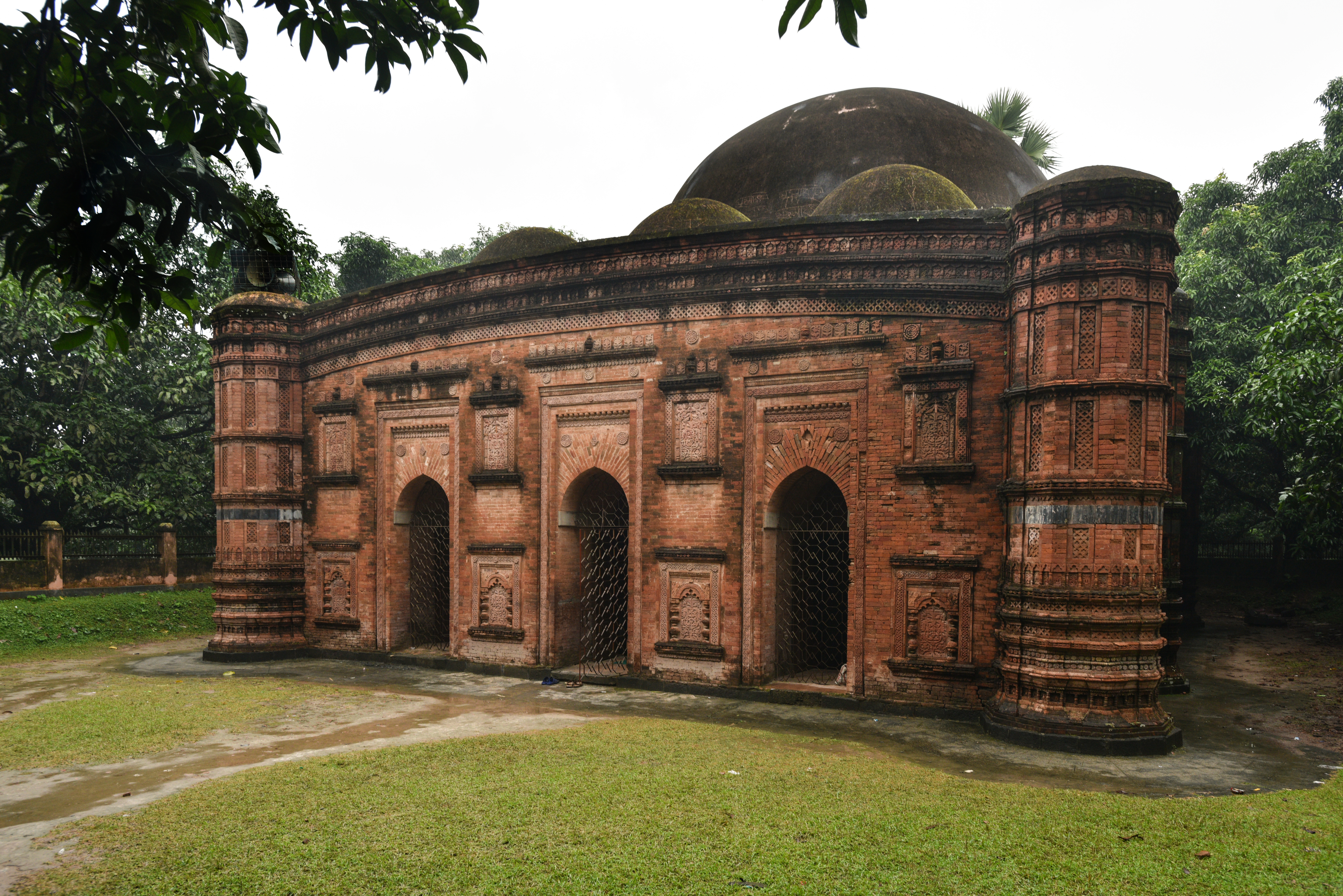
- Chapainawabganj Landmarks (Clockwise from top): Choto Sona Mosque, Darasbari Mosque, Khania Dighi Mosque, Dhania Chalk Mosque, Mughal Tahakhana
- Nickname(s): Chapai, Nawabganj
- Location of Chapai Nawabganj District in Bangladesh
- Interactive map of Chapainawabganj District
- Coordinates: 24.73°N 88.20°E
- Country: Bangladesh
- Division: Rajshahi Division
- Established: 1984 CE

Area
  - Total: 1,702.55 km^{2} (657.36 sq mi)

Population (2022)
  - Total: 1,835,528
  - Density: 1,078.11/km^{2} (2,792.28/sq mi)
- Demonym(s): Chapaiya, (Chapai) Nobabgonji, Rajshahiyo
- Time zone: UTC+06:00 (BST)
- Postal code: 6300
- Area code: 0781
- ISO 3166 code: BD-45
- HDI (2019): 0.642 medium · 6th of 21

Chapainawabganj (Bengali: চাঁপাইনবাবগঞ্জ), often colloquially simply called Chapai (Bengali: চাঁপাই pronounced Cām̐pāi) is a district of the Rajshahi Division. This district is the north-western most part of Bangladesh. The north and western part of Chapainawabganj is bounded by Malda and Murshidabad districts of West Bengal, the east by Naogaon district, and south-east by Rajshahi district.

== History ==
Chapainawabganj made the Goura capital of ancient Bengal alongside Malda. This region had strategic and commercial importance due to its location at the junction of the rivers Mahananda and Padma. Because of its importance, Alivardi Khan, the fourth Nawab of Bengal, founded Nawabganj town which in course of time became part of the name of the broader region. Until 1947, Nawabganj was a thana under the Malda district of the Rajshahi Division in the British Raj. After the 1947 parition of Bengal and British exist, Chapainawabganj directly became one of the sub-districts of the Rajshahi district until 1984. It was granted its own district-hood in 1984 by the government of Bangladesh, under the Rajshahi Division of the country.

The gateway of North Bengal from the western side, Chapai region (alongside Malda region) was once the capital of the historic Goura-Bangla region, with land classified as Tal, Diara, and Barind. The ruins of the ancient city of Gauda remains in this disctrict.

Chapai is part of the ancient regions of Pundra, Varendra and Gaura. As well as parts of the Pundra Kingdom, the ancient-most known kingdom native to Bangladesh; and being at the heart of the capital of the Gauda Kingdom and the Bengal Sultanate. The cities of Gauda and Pundra had been the capital of Bengal in ancient and medieval ages. The boundaries of Gauda has changed in different ages since 5th century BC, at times stretching far and wide, however, Chapai remains at the heart of it. The natives of Chapai speak the North-Central Varendri dialect of the Bengali language (also called Gaudi Bangla).

After the fall of the Gupta Empire, in the early 7th century AD, Emperor Shaskanka (often considered the first sovereign of unified Bengal) as well as successive Kings of Gauda ruled Bengal from the Gauda region independently for more than three decades, after which the Palas arose from this region after the century of anarchy. From the middle of 8th century to the end of 11th century, for over four hundred years, the native Pala Empire ruled Bengal from this region. The Pala rulers took the historic title of Gaudeswar, meaning 'King of Gauda.' It was during their reign that the Jagadalla Vihara monastery in Barind flourished paralleling with Nalanda, Vikramshila, and Devikot monastaries. This period of Bengal is known as the 1st Bengali Golden Age. The native, devout-Buddhist Pala Dynasty eventually fell to the invasion of the south-Indian born Sena Empire. The Sena rulers were Brahminic Hindus, and in the habit of moving from place to place within their kingdom. During the rule of Lakshman Sen, this region became known as Lakshmanabati. The Sena kings ruled Bengal until Muhammad bin Bakhtiyar Khilji conquered Bengal in 1204 AD. Thereafter, the Muslim rule lasted for about five hundred years. During the early part of the Bengal Sultanate, Gauda was its capital, and numerous mosques and other buildings were built here. The ancient city of Gauda residing within Chapai and Malda, was abandoned soon into Mughal rule, after a change in course of the Ganges left the city disease-ridden.

Nawab Sirajuddaulah, the last sovereign of pre-colonial independent Bengal, was defeated by Robert Clive at the Battle of Plassey in 1757, which marked the beginning of British rule. Malda district was formed in 1813 out of the outlying areas of Purnia, Dinajpur, and Rajshahi districts. At the time of Dr. B. Hamilton (1808–09), the present thanas of Gazole, Malda, Bamongola, and parts of Habibpur were included in the district of Dinajpur and the thanas of Harischandrapur, Kharba, Ratua, Manikchak, and Kaliachak were included in the district of Purnia. In consequence of the prevalence of serious crimes in the Kaliachak and Sahebganj thanas and near rivers, in 1813, a joint magistrate and deputy collector were appointed at English Bazar (Malda city) with jurisdiction over a number of police stations centred around that place and taken away from the two districts. Thus, the district of Malda was born.

The year 1832 saw the establishment of a separate treasury, and in 1859 a full-fledged magistrate and collector was posted. Until 1876, the Malda district formed part of the Rajshahi Division, and from 1876 to 1905 it formed part of Bhagalpur Division; within the rule of the British Raj. In 1905, Malda district was again transferred to Rajshahi Division, and until 1947, Malda remained in this division. In August 1947, this district was affected by the Partition of Bengal. Between 12 and 15 August of 1947, whether the district would become part of the dominion of India or Pakistan was unknown, as the announcement of the Radcliffe line did not make this point clear. During these few days, the then-Malda district was under a magistrate of East Pakistan, until the details of the Radcliffe award were published on 17 August, 1947 and it became part of West Bengal, India, but five thanas of this district became part of East Bengal, Pakistan, returning once again toRajshahi but this time directly, forming the Chapainawabganj sub-district, and after the independence of Bangladesh, eventually becoming its own district in 1984 under the Rajshahi Division of Bangladesh.

Chapai has witnessed different empires which were raised, flourished, and then cast down near oblivion by a successor kingdom built up on the relics of its predecessor on its soil, both native and foreign. Evidence include legions of relics of a predecessor kingdom being used in the monuments of the successor kingdoms. Chapai awaits the advent of tourists and people of archaeological interest with its wealth to be enjoyed and its huge potential to be explored.

== Geography ==
=== Geographical location ===
Chapainawabganj is the most western district of Bangladesh. Rajshahi and Naogaon is on the east, while on the Indian side is Malda of West Bengal, the rest of India is on the north. Western side is surrounded by the river Padma and Malda district and Murshidabad of West Bengal (India), India is on the southern side. Chapai Nawabganj is situated between the latitude 24'22 to 24'57 and longitude 87'23 to 88'23. Chapainawabganj is regarded as one of the mango cities of Bangladesh, due to the abundant cultivation of mangoes in this district.

=== Climate ===
Chapainawabganj is very close to the big city Rajshahi and the climate of both districts are very close. Under Köppen climate classification, Rajshahi has a tropical wet and dry climate. The climate of Rajshahi is generally marked with monsoons, high temperature, considerable humidity and moderate rainfall. The hot season commences early in March and continues till the middle of July. The maximum mean temperature observed is about during the months of April, May, June and July and the minimum temperature recorded in January is about 7 to 16 °C (45 to 61 °F). The highest rainfall is observed during the months of monsoon. The annual rainfall in the district is about 1,448 millimetres (57.0 in).

=== Topography ===
Chapainawabganj District (Rajshahi Division) has an area of 1702.55 km^{2}. Many rivers flows over this area. The main rivers are the Ganges, and Mahananda.

Google Earth view

Most of the land of this area are plain land with many small ponds and water reservoirs. But, recently, the geography has changed due to the erosion by the river Padma (Ganges). Overload of river sediment caused by farrakka barrage eroded the river banks and created a large area of land full of sand which almost looks like a small desert in this area. Four to five small union parisad like narayonpur, johurpur, sundorpur, baghdanga has shifted to the other side of the river Padma.

Based on formation of soil, Chapai Nawabganj can be divided into two different parts: Borendra area and Diyar area.

The east part of the river Mohananda is part of Borind Track and known as Borendra area. Borendra area is one of the oldest well known areas not only in Bangladesh but also all over the sub-continent. Borendra area was formed during the formation of the triangle of Bengal. Chapai Nawabganj sadar, part of Gomostapur Upozilla and Nachol constitutes the borendra area. The main crops of this area is the rice.

The region in the river Padma basin is known as diyar. The area formed for the continuous change of path of the river Padma. The soil of this area are very fertile and people can cultivate multiple times a year of different type of crops. Main crops are rice, wheat, melons– the most famous corn is Kalai. Mango gardens are increasing rapidly beside these crops now. This area was also famous for the cultivation of indigo and silk.

=== Rivers and waters ===
==== Padma River ====
The Ganges river originates in the Himalayas and flows through Northern and Eastern India. This river then enters into Bangladesh at Shibganj and takes the name Padma. The Farakka Barrage was built 10 miles upstream of where Padma enters into Bangladesh which decreased the water level of Padma. But still in rainy season, this river becomes very dangerous as the water level grows high and floods the area nearby.

==== Mahananda River ====
Mahananda River entered to this district through Bholahat Upozilla and flows through the district and finally falls to the river Padma at Godagari, Rajshahi district. Nawabganj town is situated on the bank of this river and the economy of this district is driven by this river too.

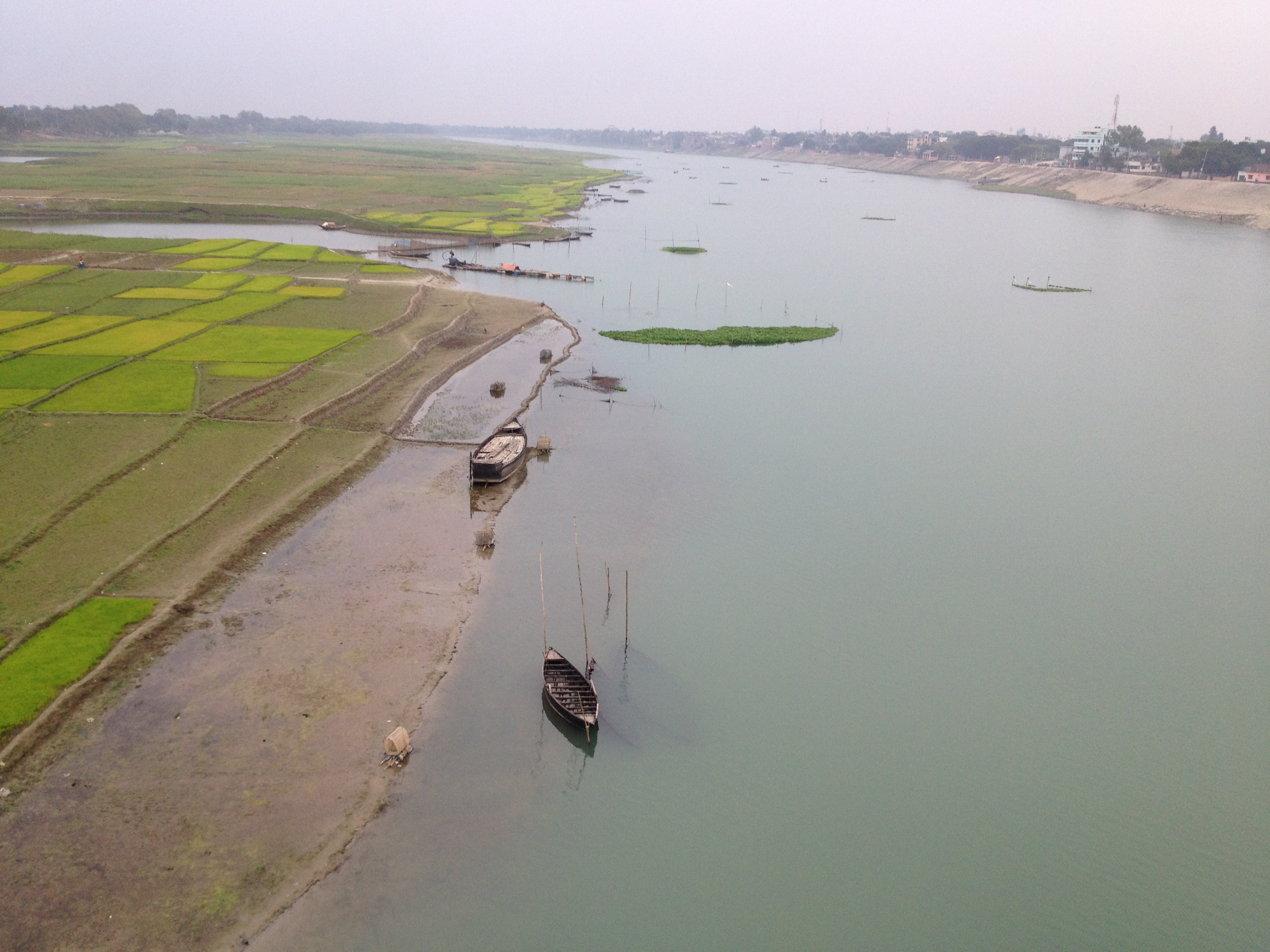
Mahananda River – view from Captain Jahangir bridge in Chapainawabganj District

==== Pagla ====
The Pagla River also flows from India and enters into Bangladesh in this district at Tattipur, Moraganga (dead gangis). After flowing a mile, it mixes with the river Mahananda.

==== Punarbhaba River ====
The Punarbhaba River flows through Dinajpur and Naogoan of Bangladesh and then enters into Chapainawabganj.

== Demographics ==
Historical population
Year	Pop.	±% p.a.
1974	794,802	—
1981	932,920	+2.32%
1991	1,171,469	+2.30%
2001	1,425,322	+1.98%
2011	1,647,521	+1.46%
2022	1,835,528	+0.99%

According to the 2022 Census of Bangladesh, Chapai Nawabganj District has 448,028 households and a population of 1,835,528 with an average 4.07 people per household. Among the population, 367,283 (20.01%) inhabitants are under 10 years of age. The population density is 1,078 people per km^{2}. Chapai Nawabganj District has a literacy rate (age 7 and over) of 72.00%, compared to the national average of 74.80%, and a sex ratio of 93.56 males per 100 females. Approximately, 25.46% (467,327) of the population live in urban areas. Ethnic population is 23,278 (1.27%), of which 6,510 are Oraon, 6,409 Santal, 4,196 Barman and 1,187 Rajuar.

=== Religion ===
Religions in Chapai Nawabganj District (2022)
Religion	Percent
Islam	95.56%
Hinduism	3.93%
Other or not stated	0.51%

Religion in present-day Chapai Nawabganj District
Religion	1941 (Note: Sibganj, Nawabganj, Gomastapur, Bholahat and Nachole thanas of Malda district)		1981		1991		2001		2011		2022	
Religion	Pop.	%	Pop.	%	Pop.	%	Pop.	%	Pop.	%	Pop.	%
Islam	285,914	73.63%	867,564	92.99%	1,104,415	94.28%	1,356,524	95.17%	1,571,151	95.36%	1,753,993	95.56%
Hinduism	87,337	22.49%	57,323	6.14%	54,894	4.69%	60,809	4.27%	66,602	4.04%	72,178	3.93%
Ethnic religion	14,987	3.86%	—N/a	—N/a	—N/a	—N/a	—N/a	—N/a	—N/a	—N/a	—N/a	—N/a
Christianity	17	~0%	2,122	0.23%	2,775	0.23%	4,493	0.32%	5,725	0.35%	7,216	0.39%
Others (Note: Including Jainism, Buddhism, Zoroastrianism, Judaism, Ad-Dharmis, or not stated)	48	0.02%	5,911	0.64%	9,385	0.80%	3,496	0.24%	4,043	0.25%	2,141	0.12%
Total Population	388,303	100%	932920	100%	1171469	100%	1425322	100%	1647521	100%	1,835,528	100%

According to 2022 Bangladeshi census, Muslims composed 95.56% of the population and Hindus 3.93%.

== Post-compulsory education ==
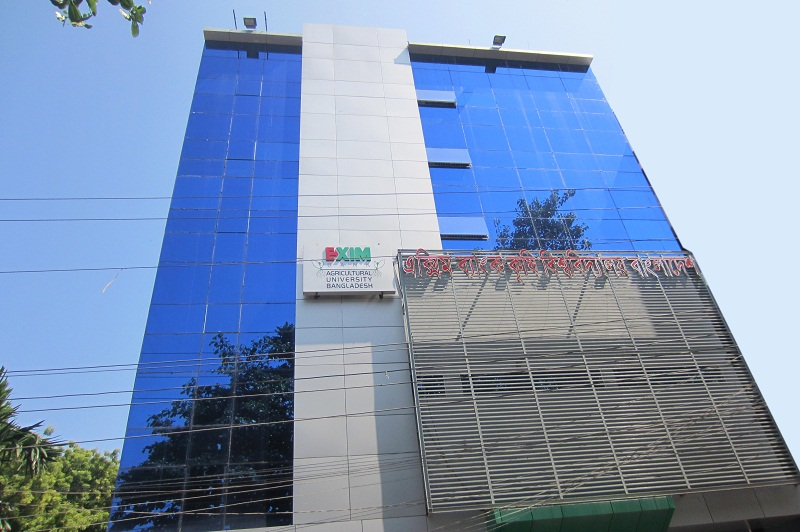
Exim Bank Agricultural University Bangladesh (EBAUB)

Chapainawabganj has only one university at its boro Indara Moor. Exim Bank Agricultural University Bangladesh (EBAUB) was established in 2013 to provide students of this area with education specializing in agriculture. It also provides undergraduate degrees in Agricultural Economics, Business Administration and Law. Along with Nawabganj Govt. College and Shah Neyamotullah College, EXIM Bank Agricultural University is considered to be the pinnacle of educational institutions in this district.

Notable colleges in Chapainawabganj District:

1. Adina Fazlul Haque Govt. College
2. Nawabganj Government College
3. Chapainawabganj Polytechnic Institute
4. Rahanpur Homoeopathic Medical College
5. Nawabganj City College
6. Shibganj Mohila Degree College
7. Ranihati Degree College
8. Sara Bangla A K Fojlol Haqe College
9. Shibgang Boys College
10. Namoshankarbati Degree College

The students and teachers originally from Chapainawabganj formed a committee named 'Chapainawabganj Somiti' in many institutions outside of Chapainawabganj.

== Economy and Transportion ==
=== Economy ===
This district is mainly a plain land with rivers. The whole district is full of fertile land with proper irrigation facilities. That is why the economy is totally dependent on agriculture. But as there are a number of rivers flowing through this district, and many people depend on fishing and other related activities.

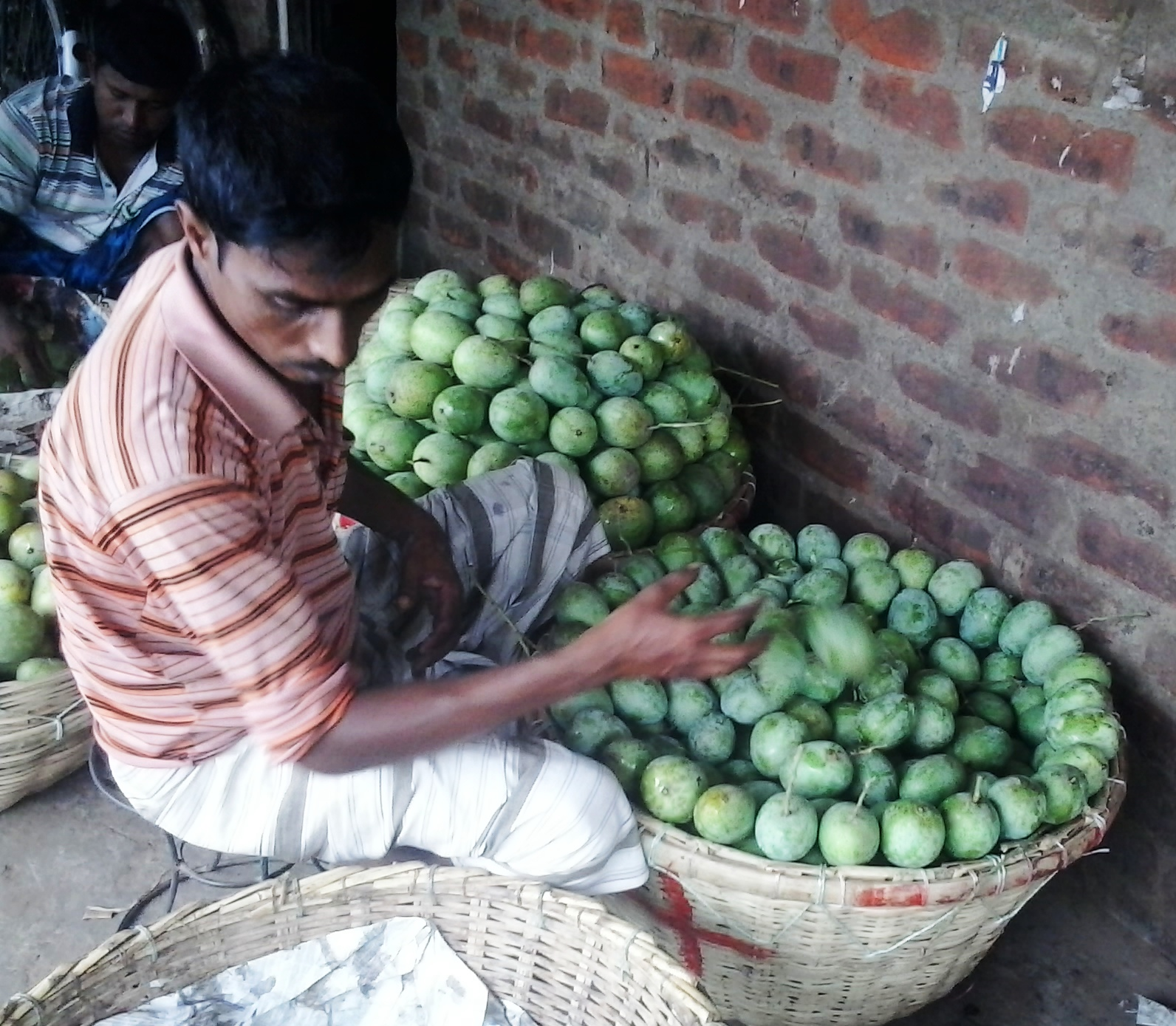
Mango seller, Rohonpur market, Chapainawabganj, Bangladesh

Chapainawabganj is called the capital of the mango in Bangladesh because it is this summer fruit that is the main product that sustains the economy of this district. Most of the land of this district is full of mango orchards where various kinds of mango are produced. The economy is surrounded by the production of the mango in this district. The main part of mango production is the Shibganj, Bholahat and Gamostapur upazila.

=== Transportion ===
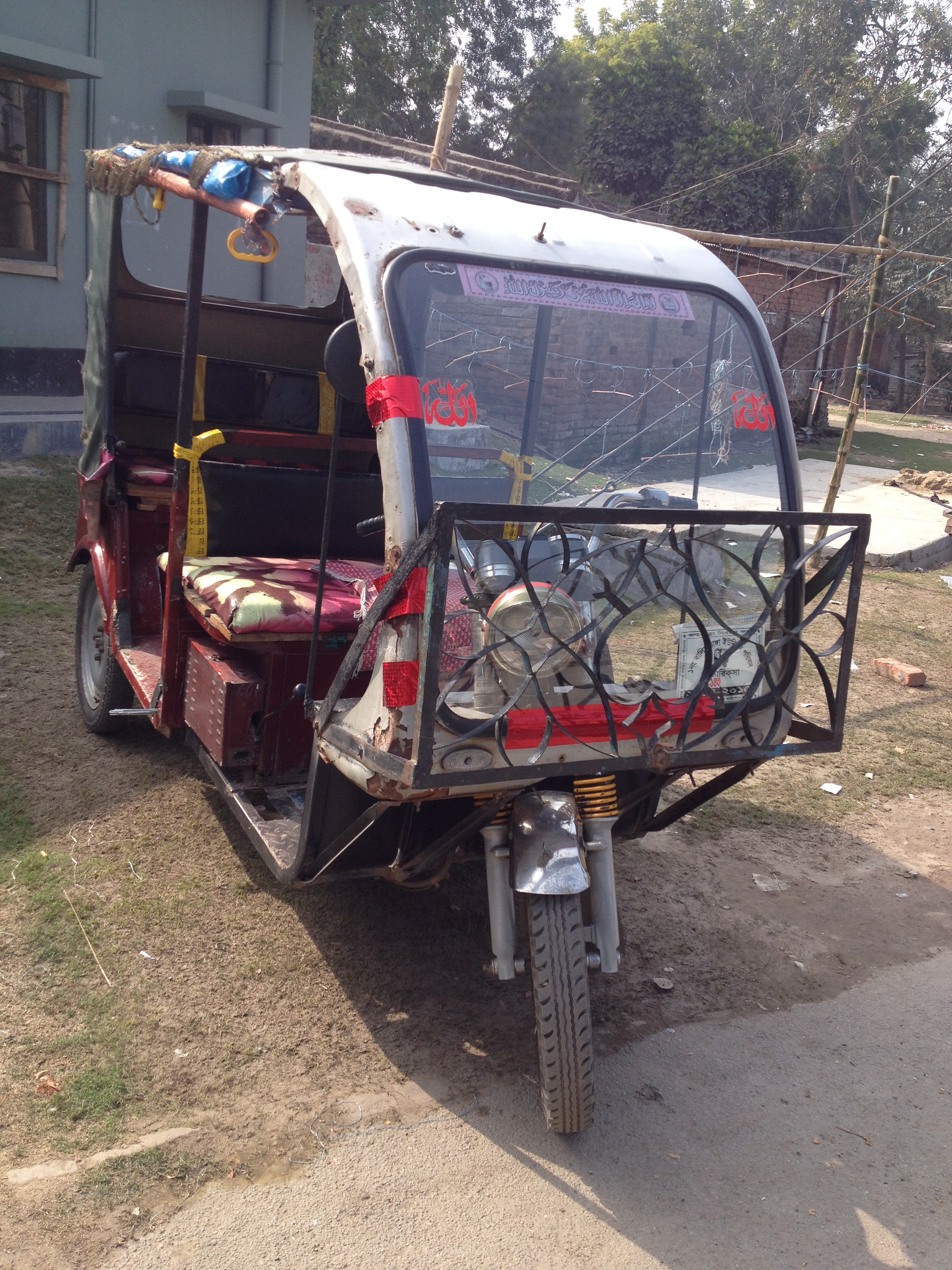
This is now the main transport vehicle in chapainawabganj district

The district is located in western Bangladesh and shares an international boundary with India. It contains a land port used for cross-border trade between Bangladesh and India. The Jamuna Bridge at Sirajganj provides a major road connection across the Jamuna River and contributes to the district's connectivity with other parts of Bangladesh. Road transport within the district's urban areas includes motorcycles, rickshaws, bicycles, and CNG-powered auto-rickshaws. Several major highways and regional roads pass through the district.

==== Bus ====
The major transportation system in this town is the bus service to different districts and towns. The main transportation route is Nawabganj-Rajshahi. The bus transportation service is off three types which are gate-lock, direct and local service. The others bus routes are Nawabganj-Shibganj, Nawabganj-Naogaon, Nawabganj-Nachol, Nawabganj-Rohanpur. The BRTC bus service serves for the long intra-district route to almost all important districts of Bangladesh. The most important long route is the Nawabganj-Dhaka. This route has ample bus service. There are two bus stoppages. The biggest one is called Chapai Nawabganj Bus Terminal and the other is the Dhaka Bus Terminal. Sona Mosjid-Rajshahi-Sona Mosjid bus Service are on at7.15am to 5.15 pm every 1 hour after.

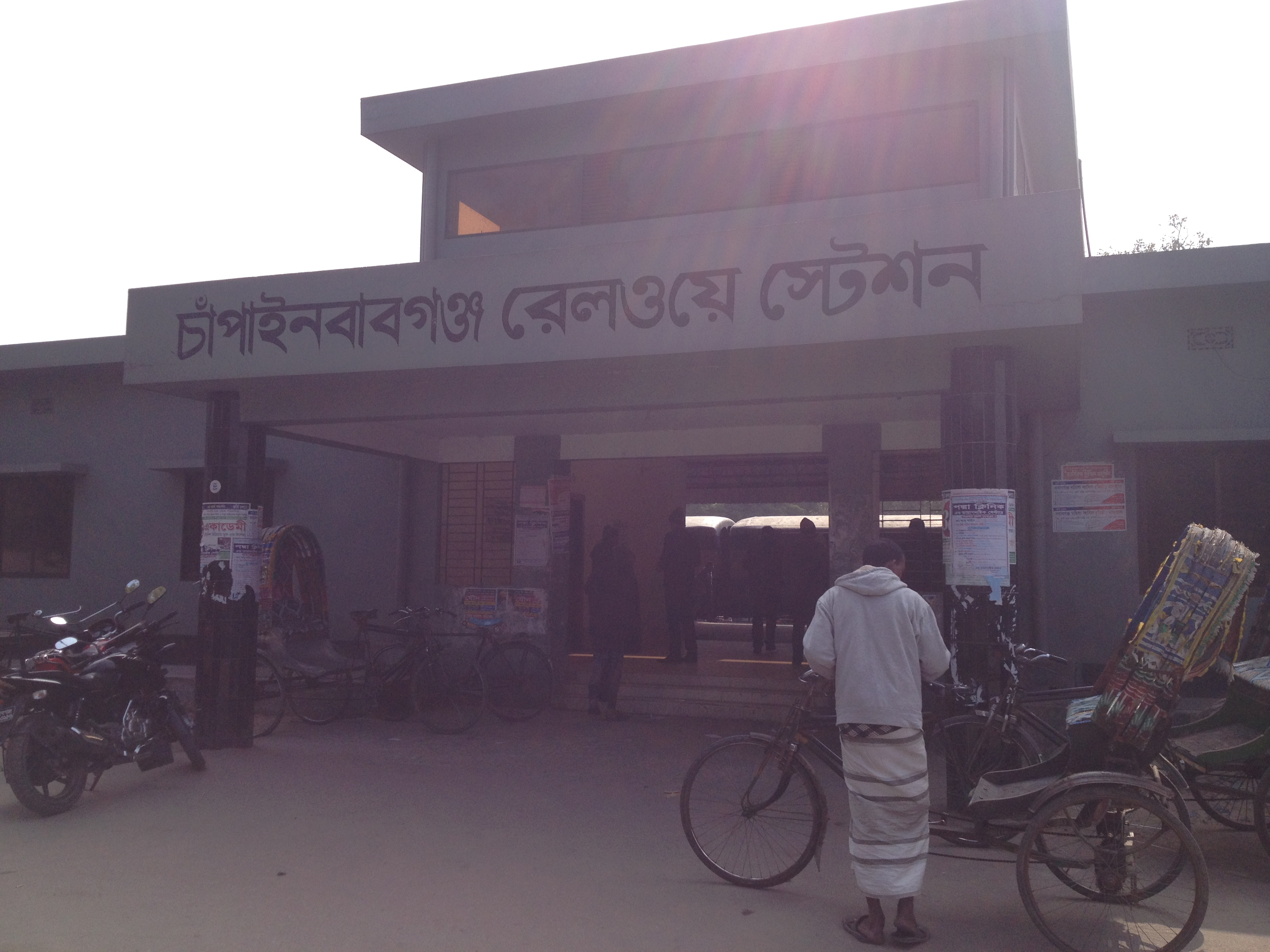
Chapainawabganj railway station

==== Railway ====
Chapainawabganj has good inter-city railway service. Banalata Express is one of the non-stop rail service of the country which starts from Chapainawabganj and end at capital city Dhaka. One of the international rail line passes through this district to Malda, West Bengal, India. There are few services of local train from different stations of Chapainawabganj such as Nawabganj Sadar, Amnura, Nachole, Nijampur, Rahanpur to Rajshahi and other parts of Bangladesh and also has a shuttle service from Nawabganj to Rajshahi for the intercity train service from Rajshahi to other part of Bangladesh.

==== Waterway ====
In the past, the main transport system was based on the water path. The river Padma (Ganges), Mahananda River, Pagla, Punorvoba, Moraganga and some beels (marshland) were used for intra-district transport system. The water level went down due to adverse effect of Farakka Barrage on Padma (Ganges) river, and therefore, water transport has lost its popularity. But still rivers are used for transportation of daily goods from different parts of the district. Still the transportation from the villages in western and eastern parts of the district depends on the boat. In the Shibgonj Upozila have a small river named Pagla.

== Culture ==
=== Art ===
==== Music ====
Gombhira gaan is a kind of folk song popular in this district.

=== Language ===
The people of Chapainawabganj use the Bangla language but they have their own dialect. The dialect consists of different tone as well as different words than to standard Bangla language.

=== Religion ===
The district of Chapainawabganj consists of 1987 mosques, 474 temples, 56 Buddhist temples and 28 churches. Choto Sona Mosque, Chapai Mosque, 15th century Darasbari Mosque, etc. are famous mosques. Jora Math is the famous Buddhist monastery and Naoda Stupa is the Buddhist monument.

=== Media ===
==== Radio ====
- Radio Mahananda 98.8 FM, a community radio station was established with the financial help of Japan. The operation of Radio Mahananda was inaugurated by Bangladeshi ex-minister Suranjit Sengupta.

== Places of interest ==
=== Choto Sona Mosque ===
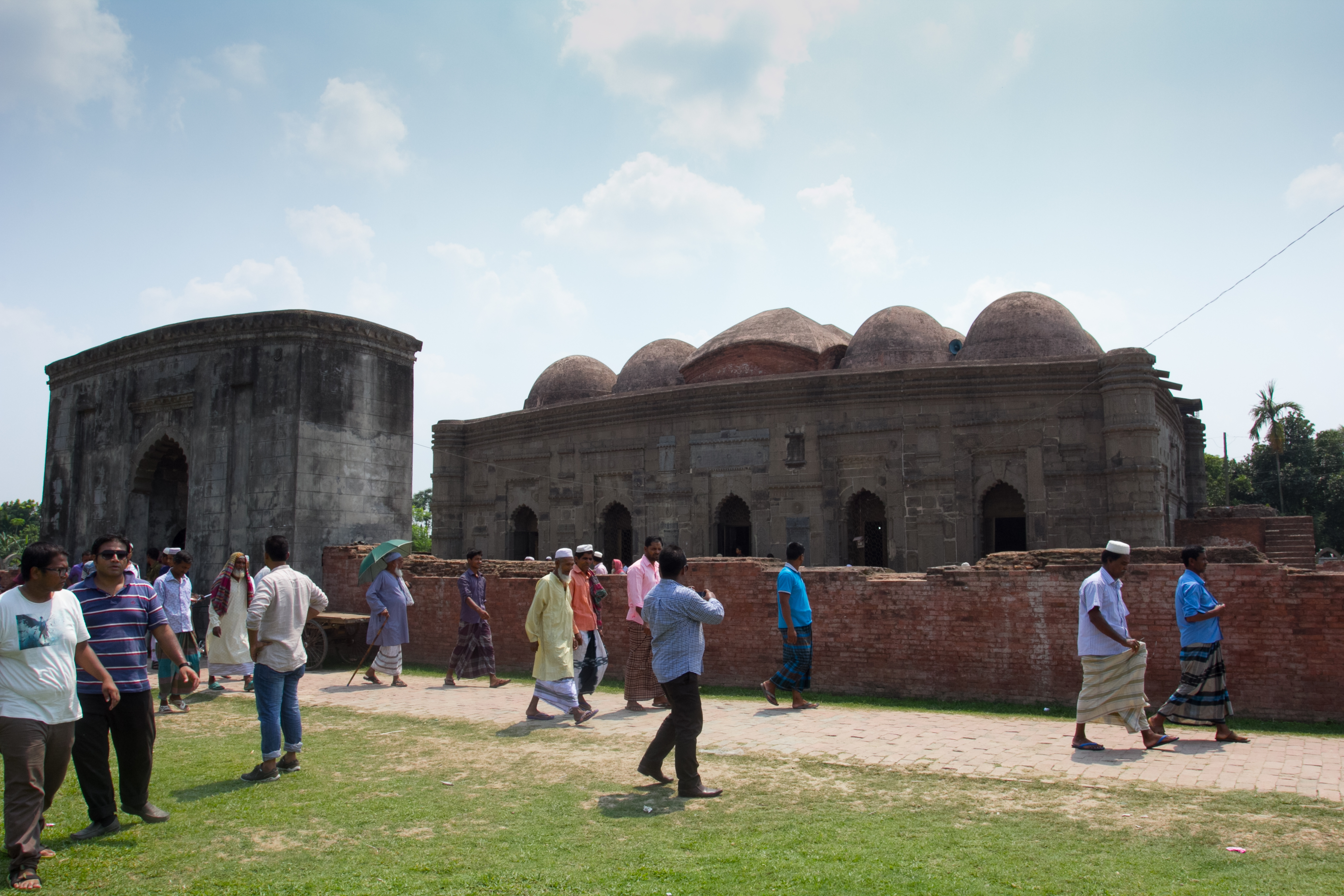
Façade of Choto Sona Mosque

One of the most graceful monument of the Sultanate period is the Chota Sona Masjid or Sona Mosque at Gaur in Chapainawabganj built during the reign of Sultan Alauddin Husain Shah (1493–1519). Originally it was roofed over with 15 gold-gilded domes including the 3 Chauchala domes in the middle row, from which it derives its curious name. By the side of this mosque Birsrestha Captain Mohiuddin Jahangir is buried.

=== Mughal Tahakhana ===
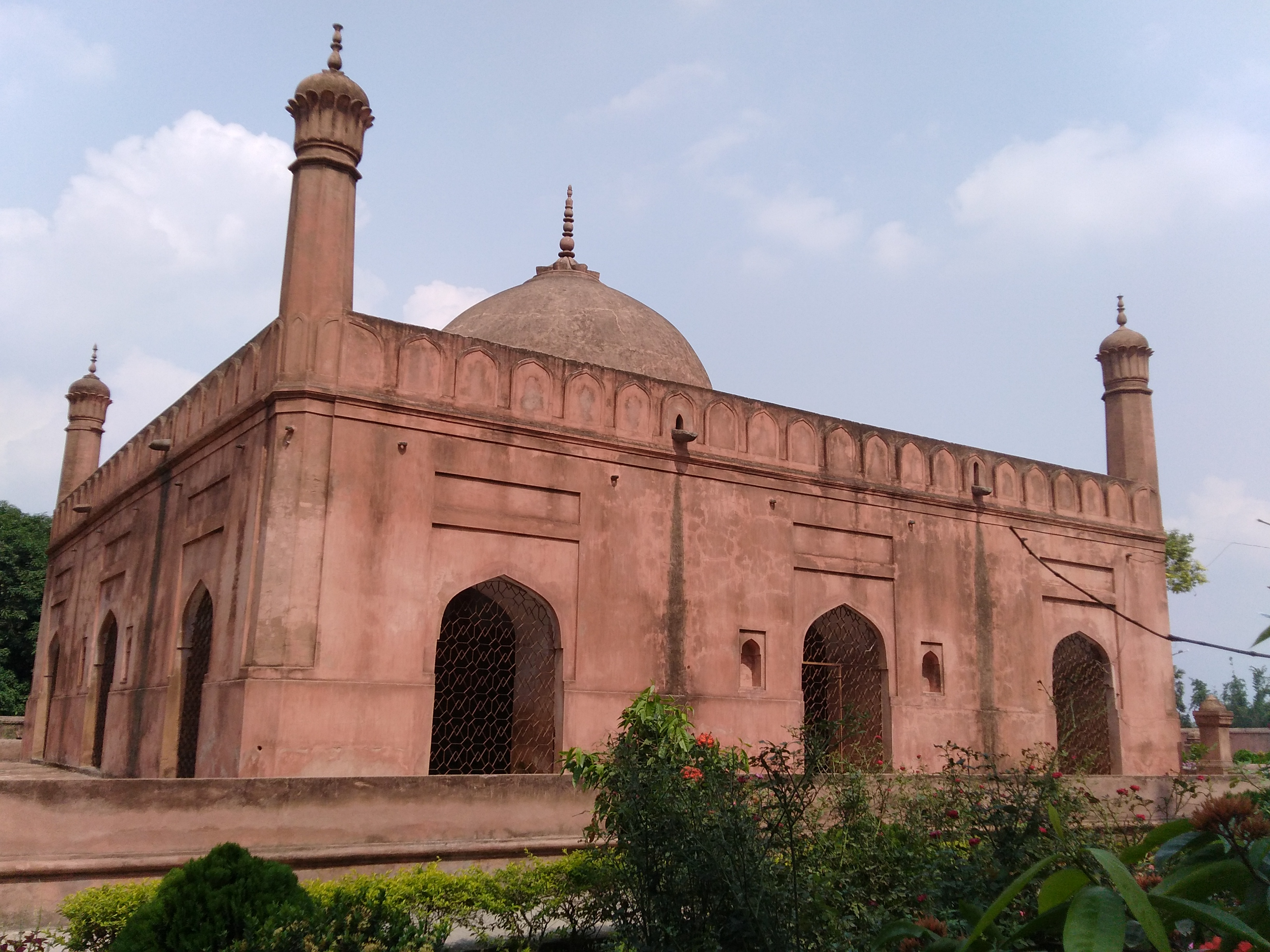
Mosque at the Tahakhana complex

The Tahkhana Complex, also known as Shah Shuja Tahakhana, is a Mughal-era palace in Shahbajpur, Shibganj Upazila, Chapainawabganj, Bangladesh, built between 1639–1658 by Shah Shuja for his spiritual guide, Shah Syed Niyamatullah. Named "Tohakhana" meaning "cold building" in persian, it served as a winter residence. The three-story complex features Mughal architecture with brick and black stone, including a main palace, three-domed mosque, a domed tomb, unnamed graves, and a lake called Dafe-ul-Balah.

=== Darasbari Mosque ===
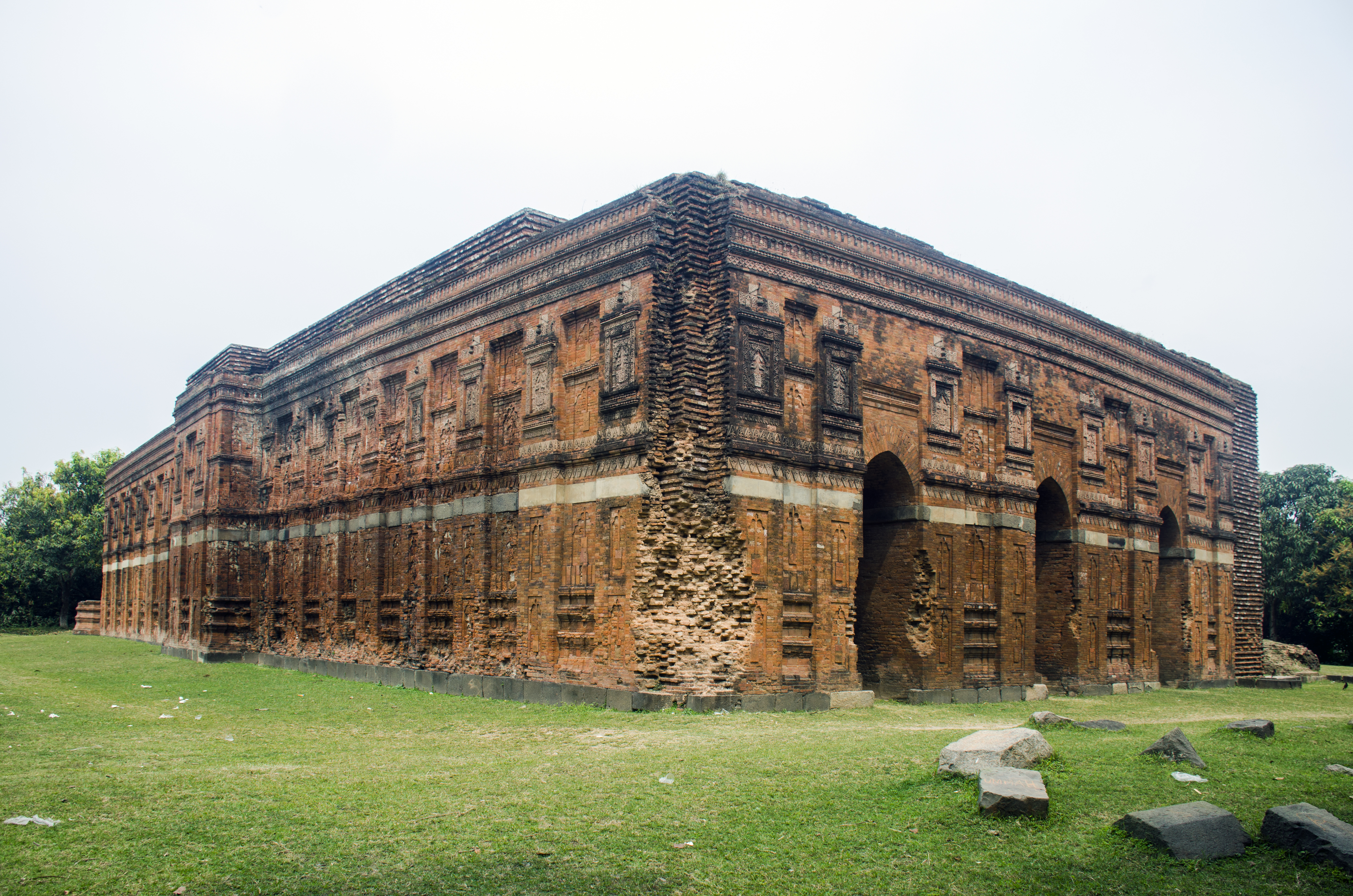
Darasbari Mosque, Shibganj

The Darasbari Mosque, located in Shibganj Upazila, Chapainawabganj, near Chota Sona Mosque, was built in 1479 CE by Sultan Shamsuddin Yusuf Shah. The medieval Bengali Jami Masjid features exposed red-tinged bricks with terracotta ornamentation.

=== Khania Dighi Mosque ===
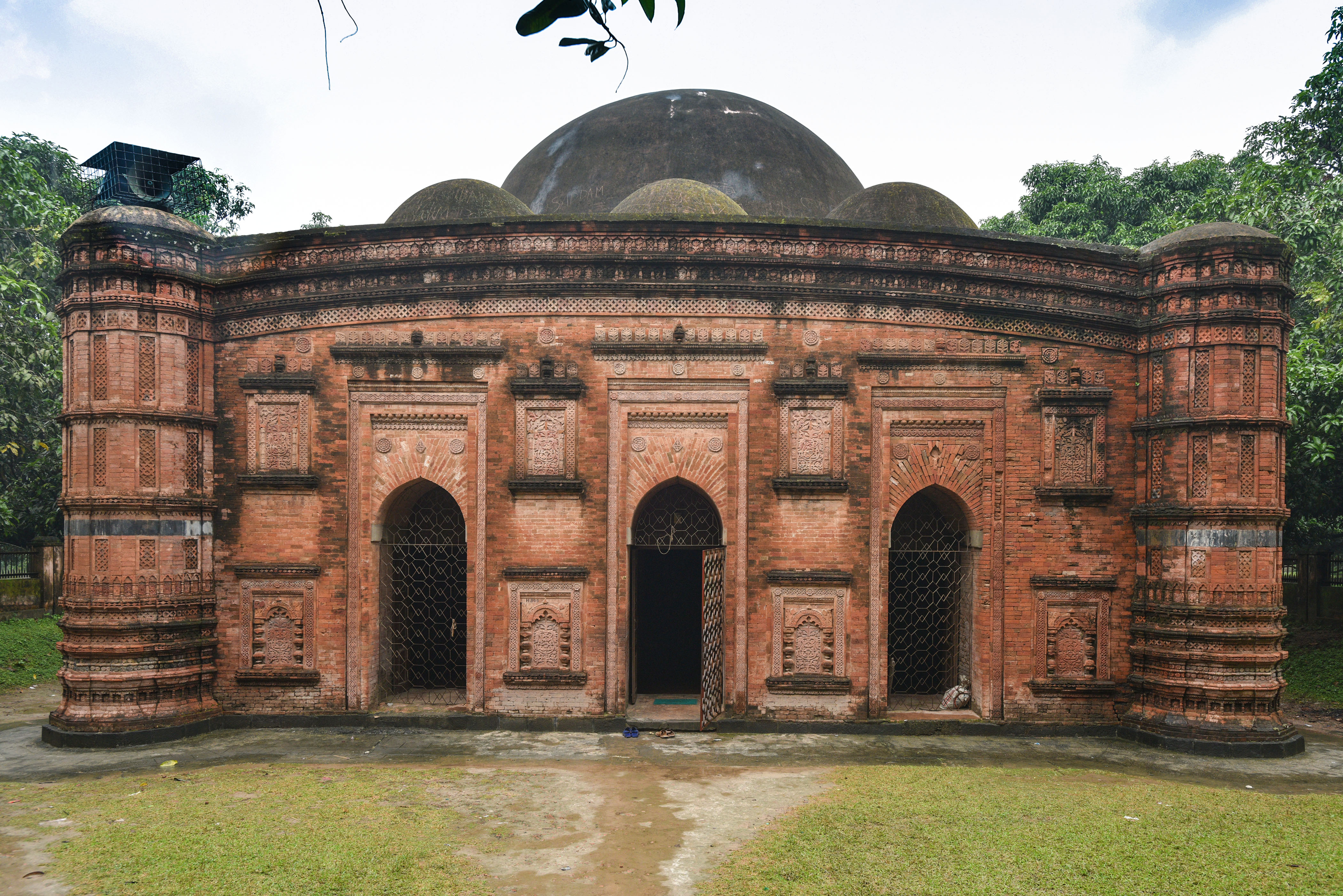
Facade of Khania Dighi Mosque

Khania Dighi Mosque, also known as Rajbibi or Chamchika Mosque, is a 15th-century mosque located in Chapai Nawabganj, Bangladesh, near the Khania Dighi reservoir. Built around 1480 CE during the Ilyas Shahi period, it features a square prayer chamber with a large hemispherical dome and a three-domed verandah. Constructed primarily of bricks, the mosque showcases intricate terracotta ornamentation and a distinctive architectural style influenced by Seljuk and early Ottoman designs from Turkish Anatolia. Restored by the Department of Archaeology, Bangladesh, it remains a well-preserved example of Bengal’s Sultanate-era architecture.

=== Shah Niamatullah's Tomb ===
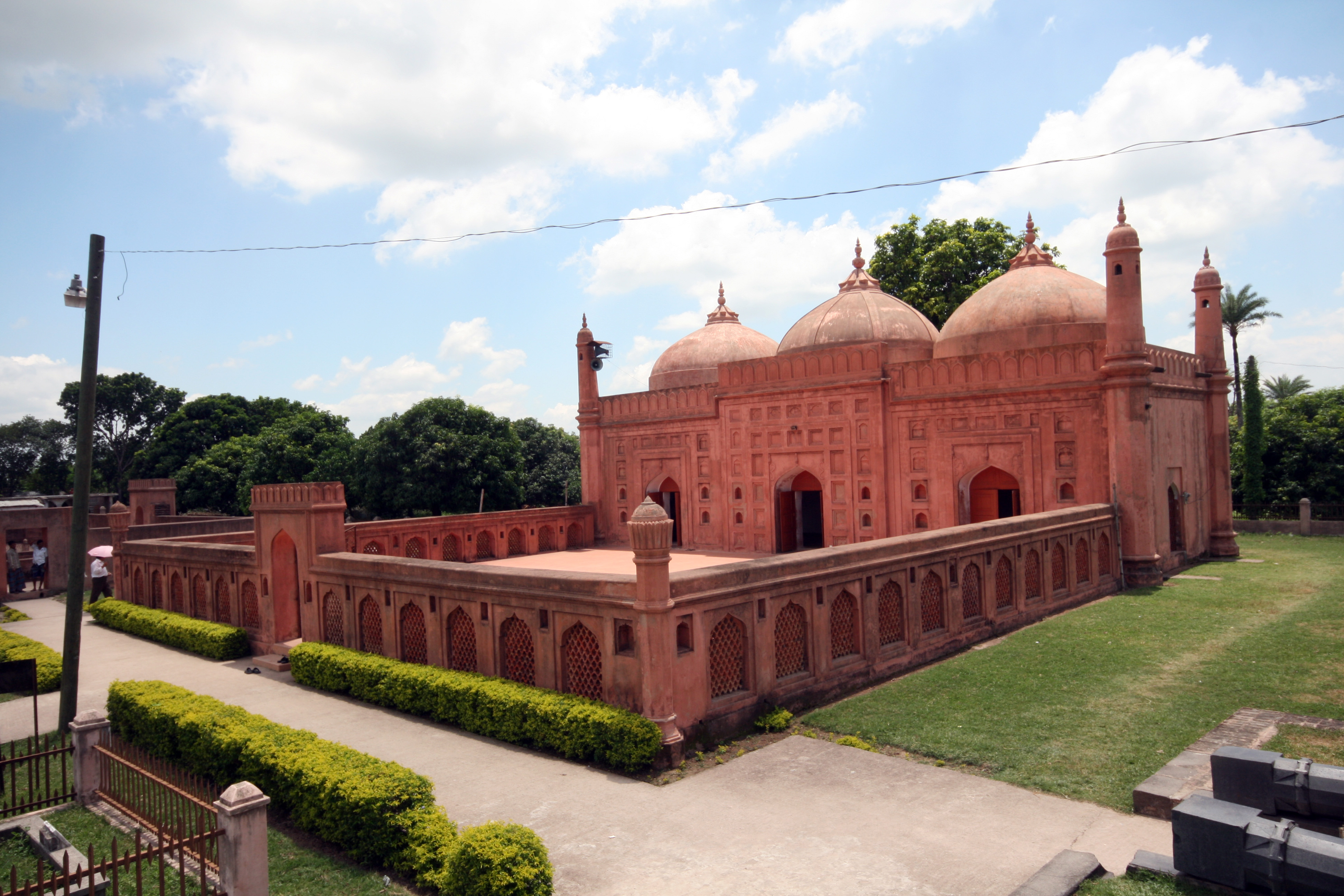
Shah Niamatullah's Mosque in Mughal Tahakhana, believed to be built by Shah Shuja

Shah Niamatullah's Tomb is the earliest Mughal tomb structure in Bangladesh. It is situated at mauza Firozpur under Shibganj upazila of Nawabganj district; about half a mile to the northwest of the Choto Sona Mosque. Tradition ascribes it to Shah Shuja (1639-1660 AD), who is reported to have built the Shah Niamatullah Mosque Complex. Presence of some architectural features of the Mughal period suggests that it dates back to the mid-17th century.

=== Dhania Chalk Mosque ===
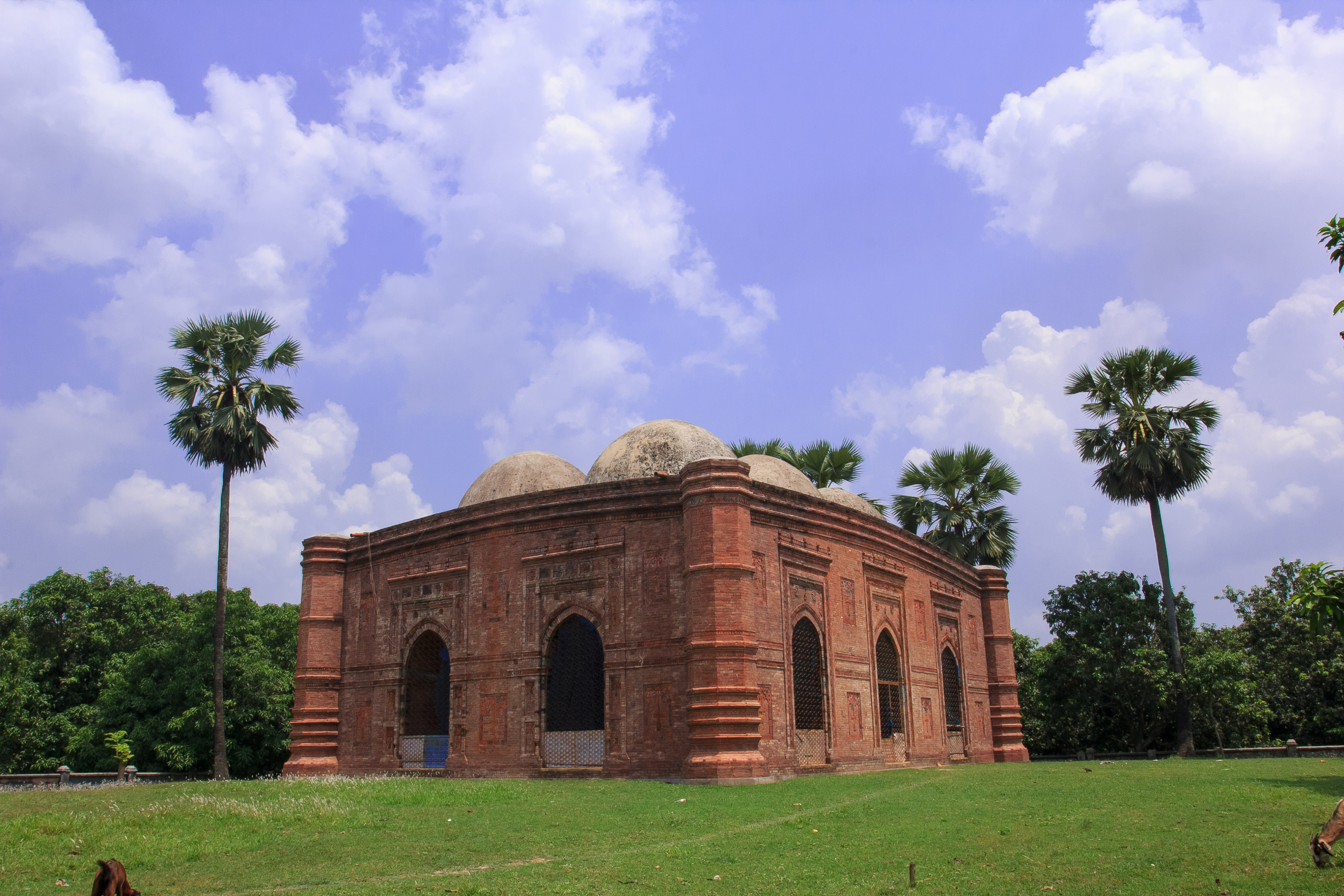
Dhunichawk Mosque or Dhaque or Dhania Chawk Mosque, situated in Chapainawabganj

Dhunichawk Mosque also known as Dhania Chalk Mosque, located in ancient city of Gaur, Chapai Nawabganj, less than a kilometer south of Khania Dighi Mosque, is a late 15th-century Sultanate-era mosque. Built mainly of brick, it measures 17.07 by 11.13 m (56.0 by 36.5 ft) and originally featured a six-domed roof supported by two freestanding stone pillars and engaged pilasters. Only the north and south walls remain intact, with traces of terracotta ornamentation and cusped mihrab arches.

== Administration ==
Chapainawabganj district comprises five Upazilas:

1. Bholahat Upazila
2. Gomastapur Upazila
3. Nachole Upazila
4. Chapainawabganj Sadar Upazila
5. Shibganj Upazila.

There are four municipalities

1. Chapainawabganj Municipality
2. Shibganj Municipality
3. Rohanpur Municipality
4. Nachole Municipality

== Notable residents ==
- Khabeeruddin Ahmed (1870–1939), politician
- Idris Ahmed Mia (1894–1966), politician
- Mohammad Mohsin (1931–2004), lawyer and politician
- Ghulam Arieff Tipoo (1931–2024), jurist
- Rafiqun Nabi (born 1943), cartoonist
- Shahjahan Miah (born 1947), former MP
- Brig. General Muhammad Enamul Huq (born 1947), former State Minister of Power
- Muhammad Mizanuddin (born 1953), 22nd Vice-Chancellor of the University of Rajshahi
- Durul Huda (1955–2020), second Mayor of Rajshahi
- Mohammed Aminul Karim Rumi (born 1955), general and military secretary to the president
- Mohammad Yusuf Siddiq (born 1957), historian, epigraphist, researcher, professor and author
- Md. Golam Rabbani Mridha (born 1958), former MP
- Murtaza Raza Choudhry, former Finance Minister of East Bengal
- Mainur Reza Choudhury, Chief Justice Supreme Court of Bangladesh
- Zara Jabeen Mahbub, former MP
- Dr. Moin Uddin Ahmed Montu (1936–2011), physician and former MP
- Shamil Uddin Ahmed Shimul (born 1969), former MP
- Mahbubul Alam, former MP
- Ila Mitra, politician
- Emajuddin Ahmed, educationist
- Momtazuddin Ahmed, scholar
- Mohammad Moniruzzaman Miah, Vice Chancellor of University of Dhaka
- Abdul Haque, writer
- Ahmed Rubel, actor
- Mahiya Mahi, actress
- Nahid Rana, International Cricket Player

== See also ==
- Upazilas of Bangladesh
- Districts of Bangladesh
- Divisions of Bangladesh
- Upazila
- Thana
- Administrative geography of Bangladesh
