= Hasan Mahmud (politician) =

Bangladeshi politician

- হাছান মাহমুদ
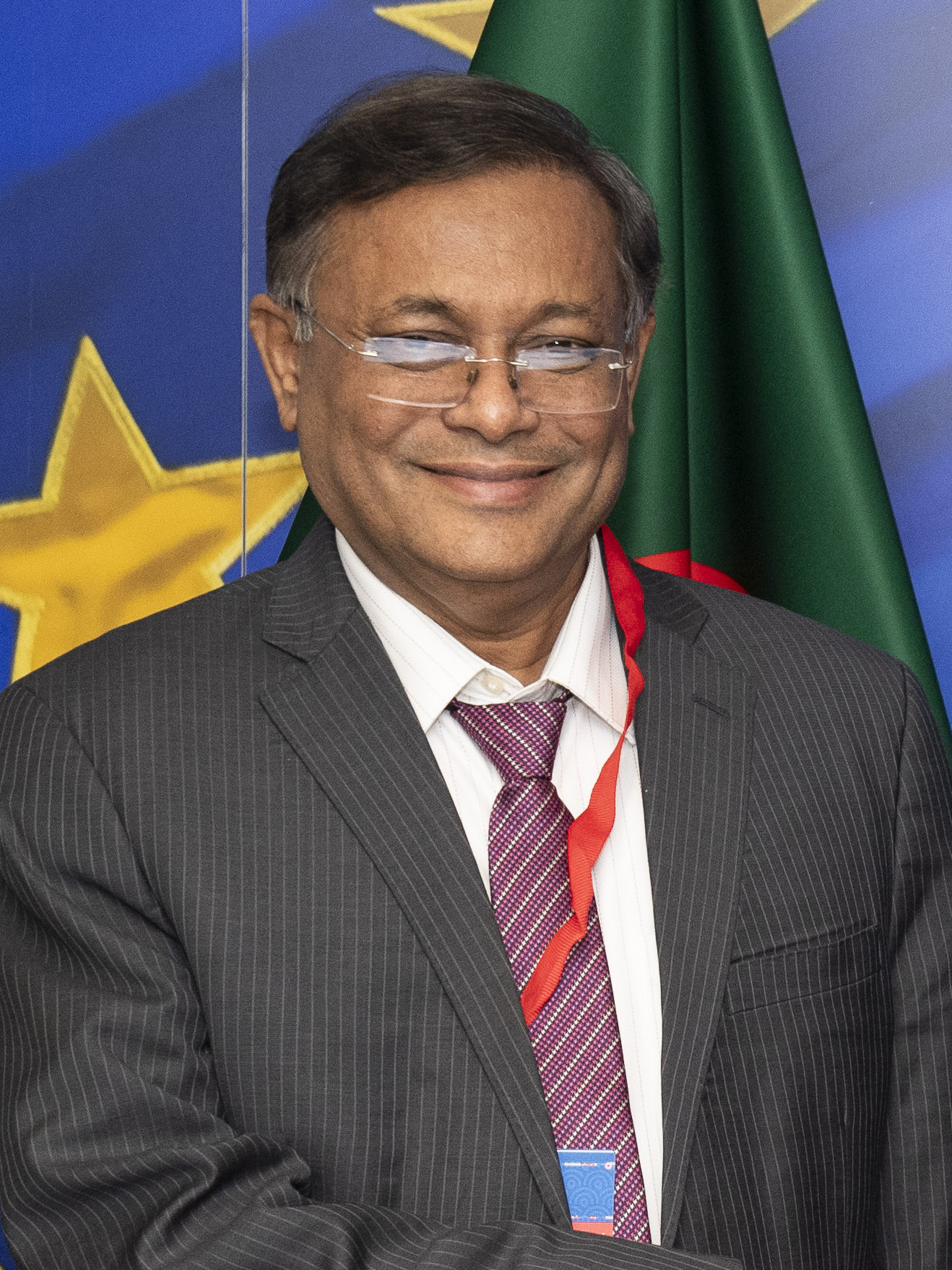
- Mahmud in 2024

Minister of Foreign Affairs
- In office 11 January 2024 – 6 August 2024
- Prime Minister: Sheikh Hasina
- Preceded by: AK Abdul Momen
- Succeeded by: Md. Touhid Hossain

Member of Parliament
- In office 7 January 2014 – 6 August 2024
- Preceded by: Moin Uddin Khan Badal
- Succeeded by: Humam Quader Chowdhury
- Constituency: Chittagong-7
- In office 29 December 2008 – 6 January 2014
- Preceded by: A.B.M. Fazle Karim Chowdhury
- Succeeded by: A.B.M. Fazle Karim Chowdhury
- Constituency: Chittagong-6

Minister of Information and Broadcasting
- In office 7 January 2019 – 10 January 2024
- Preceded by: Hasanul Haq Inu

Minister of Environment, Forest and Climate Change
- In office 29 November 2011 – 24 January 2014
- Preceded by: Chowdhury Sajjadul Karim
- Succeeded by: Anwar Hossain Manju

Minister of State for Environment, Forest and Climate Change
- In office 1 August 2009 – 28 November 2011
- Preceded by: Jafrul Islam Chowdhury

Minister of Foreign Affairs
- In office 8 January 2009 – 31 July 2009
- Preceded by: Iftekhar Ahmed Chowdhury
- Succeeded by: Shahriar Alam

Personal details
- Born: Hasan Mahmud; 5 June 1963 (age 63) Chittagong, East Pakistan, Pakistan
- Citizenship: Belgium
- Party: Bangladesh Awami League
- Education: Doctor of Philosophy in Environmental Chemistry
- Alma mater: University of Chittagong; University of Limburg; Government Hazi Mohammad Mohsin College

Hasan Mahmud (born 5 June 1963) is a politician from Bangladesh Awami League. He is a former minister of foreign affairs for the fifth Hasina ministry, and a former member of parliament from Chittagong-7. Mahmud has been accused as one of the main perpetrators of the July massacre by the Interim Government of Bangladesh following the resignation and ousting of Sheikh Hasina as the Prime Minister. He is currently wanted by Bangladesh Police for his alleged involvement in crimes against humanity during the Student–People's uprising of 2024. He has reportedly fled from Bangladesh to Belgium after fall of Sheikh Hasina's regime.

== Early life ==
Hasan Mahmud was born on 5 June 1963 in Chittagong District. He completed his bachelor's and master's in chemistry from the University of Chittagong in 1987 and 1989 respectively. He completed a second masters from Vrije Universiteit Brussel in environmental science in 1996. He earned his PhD in environmental chemistry from Transnational University Limburg in 2001.

== Career ==
In 1977, Mahmud joined the Bangladesh Chhatra League. By 1988, he was the president of the Chittagong University unit of this group and was involved in campus control for Akhtaruzzaman Chowdhury Babu.

From 1996 to 2001, he acted as the political and parliamentary affairs adviser to then prime minister Sheikh Hasina. In 2001, he became special assistant to the opposition leader, Sheikh Hasina, and later took on the role of secretary for environment and forest affairs in the Awami League.

Mahmud was a member of the Jatiya Sangsad for the Chittagong-7constituency from 2008 to 2014, securing 101,340 votes, defeating Salahuddin Quader Chowdhury from the Bangladesh Nationalist Party, who received 72,073 votes.

In January 2009, he was appointed state minister for foreign affairs in Sheikh Hasina's cabinet but was shifted to state minister for environment and forests six months later. By November 2011, he was promoted to full minister of environment and forest, a position he held until the end of 2013.

In 2014, he was in Chittagong-7 during an uncontested election, as the main opposition party, the Bangladesh Nationalist Party, chose to boycott the election. He secured his position again in 2018, receiving 217,155 votes, while his closest rival from the Liberal Democratic Party got only 6,065 votes.

In September 2022, Mahmud was nominated to the Awami League Local Government Public Representative Nomination Board. In October 2022, Md Mokbul Hossain, the secretary at the Information Ministry under him, was forced into retirement.

== Controversies ==
During Mahmud's tenure as Environment minister from 2009 to 2013, multiple allegations of corruption surfaced involving the allocation of climate change funds. The Bangladesh chapter of Transparency International provided with credible allegations of political influence and nepotism in distributing contracts in climate change related projects, and corruption in selecting NGOs to operate the ground works. The corruption in climate projects awarded during his tenure was subject of SOAS University of London's study on corruption. According to a BBC Bengali report, Hasan Mahmud acknowledged the corrupt practices and downplayed it as "comparatively less than before".

Mahmud called Dr. Yunus a "traitor" during the July–August Protests for his statement to the world.

He held the citizenship of Belgium during his time as Member of Parliament which is illegal according to Article 66 of Bangladesh Constitution.

On 6 August 2024, Mahmud attempted to flee to Delhi, India after Sheikh Hasina's resignation as prime minister the previous day during the Non-cooperation movement (2024) but was intercepted and detained at Hazrat Shahjalal International Airport in Dhaka. On 11 August, Bangladesh Financial Intelligence Unit (BFIU) ordered banks to freeze all accounts of Mahmud, his wife, Nurun, and their daughter, Nafisa. But on September 6, The Business Standard reported that he fled to Belgium via Germany after the fall of Hasina regime.

Mahmud is accused of involvement in a murder case related to the death of Mohammad Alam, who was shot during a procession celebrating former Prime Minister Sheikh Hasina's resignation on August 5. The case was filed by Md Jamal Uddin, the victim's brother, and names Hasan Mahmud, along with former education minister Mohibul Hasan Chowdhury Nowfel and others, as part of a group of 525 individuals accused in the incident. The case statement alleges that the accused, under the direction of Nowfel and Hasan Mahmud, attacked the procession and opened fire, resulting in Alam being shot in the head. He was subsequently taken to Chittagong Mother and Child Hospital and Medical College, where he was pronounced dead. The police have registered the case and are conducting an investigation.

In addition to crimes against humanity during the Student–People's uprising, Mahmud is currently involved in three separate legal cases filed in Chittagong, which include a total of 83 individuals. Among those named as prime accused are Mahmud, his daughter Nafisa Zumaina Mahmud and his brother Ershad Mahmud. The first case, filed by Harun Rashid Prakash, accuses Nafisa Zumaina Mahmud, along with nine named individuals and 30 unidentified individuals, of land grabbing through intimidation.

The second case, initiated by Md Osman, names Dr. Hasan Mahmud and 31 others as accused of extortion, with 12 unnamed individuals also included. The court has ordered an investigation by the Rangunia police in this matter. The third case, filed by Kamal Uddin, charges Dr. Hasan Mahmud and 42 others, including his brother Ershad Mahmud, with assault resulting in grievous injuries to the plaintiff.

These cases were filed with the Chattogram Chief Judicial Magistrate Court, and the magistrate's clerk, Zainal Abedin, confirmed the filings. The plaintiffs have indicated that they were previously unable to file cases against the accused due to their wealth and influence. The current legal actions represent an effort to seek justice in light of the alleged offenses. These cases are ongoing, and further developments are expected as investigations proceed.

== Personal life ==
Mahmud is married to Nurun Fatema Hasan. They have a daughter, Nafisa Zumaina Mahmud. Nafisa is the chairperson of Green TV, a Bangladeshi Bengali-language satellite and cable television channel.
