= Gias Uddin Quader Chowdhury =

Bangladeshi politician

- গিয়াস উদ্দিন কাদের চৌধুরী

Member of Parliament
- Incumbent
- Assumed office 17 February 2026
- Preceded by: A.B.M. Fazle Karim Chowdhury
- Constituency: Chittagong-6
- In office 14 July 1996 – 13 July 2001
- Preceded by: Golam Akbar Khondakar
- Succeeded by: A.B.M. Fazle Karim Chowdhury
- Constituency: Chittagong-6
- In office 10 July 1986 – 6 December 1987
- Preceded by: Salahuddin Quader Chowdhury
- Succeeded by: Nazrul Islam
- Constituency: Chittagong-7

Personal details
- Born: 29 April 1953 (age 73) Gohira, East Bengal, Dominion of Pakistan
- Party: Bangladesh Nationalist Party
- Other political affiliations: Jatiya Party (Ershad); National Democratic Party; Bangladesh Muslim League
- Spouse: Meena Parveen Quader Chowdhury
- Relations: Salahuddin (brother)
- Children: 4
- Parent: A.K.M. Fazlul Quader Chowdhury (father)
- Relatives: Chowdhuries of Chittagong

Gias Uddin Quader Chowdhury (Bengali: গিয়াস উদ্দিন কাদের চৌধুরী) is a Bangladeshi businessman and Bangladesh Nationalist Party (BNP) politician who was elected as a member of parliament in the 2026 election.. He is the son of late Convention Muslim League (PMLC) leader A.K.M. Fazlul Quader Chowdhury. Gias served as a former member of the Jatiya Sangsad from the Chittagong-6 and Chittagong-7 constituencies.

== Career ==
Chowdhury's candidacy in the 2008 election was cancelled by the returning officer of Bangladesh Election Commission as a court order that cleared him a loan defaulting case did not reach the commissions office before the deadline.

In November 2009, Chowdhury's residence was attacked allegedly by Awami League activists.

On 20 May 2010, Chowdhury collected nominations papers to contest the Chittagong City Corporation mayoral elections. In September 2010, an arrest warrant was issued against him and his brother, Saifuddin Quader Chowdhury, on a bad check case.

Two of Chowdhury's followers were lynched by a mob when they were fleeing after shooting a local Jubo League leader on 24 October 2013.

Chowdhury is a vice chairman of the Bangladesh Nationalist Party as of August 2016. He is the former president of the Chittagong District (north) unit of Bangladesh Nationalist Party. He is a director of QC Container Line Ltd and QC Shipping Ltd, both of which are family-owned companies. He is also a director of Dacca Dyeing.

On 3 June 2018, Chowdhury secured bail in two cases, one over threatening Ex-Prime Minister Sheikh Hasina and another over vandalizing cars, from the High Court Division.

On 30 October 2019, Chowdhury was sentenced to three years imprisonment for making derogatory comments about Ex-Prime Minister Sheikh Hasina. He went on the run after securing a bail from the High Court Division.

== Personal life ==
Chowdhury's father, Fazlul Quader Chowdhury, was the speaker of the parliament of Pakistan. His brother, Salauddin Quader Chowdhury, was a former member of parliament. He has three other brothers, and Salman F. Rahman is his cousin. Chowdhury is married to Meena, daughter of Md Mujibul Haque, former Cabinet Secretary of Bangladesh.
