= Nurul Alam =

Bangladeshi politician

- নুরুল আলম
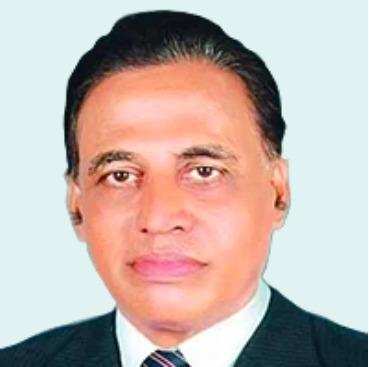

Member of Parliament

Member of Parliament for Chittagong-7
- In office 15 February 1996 – 12 June 1996
- Preceded by: Md Yousuf
- Succeeded by: Salahuddin Quader Chowdhury

Personal details
- Born: Rangunia, Chittagong District
- Party: Liberal Democratic Party

Nurul Alam is a politician who was a member of the Bangladesh Parliament for Chittagong-7 in 1996. He was elected in February 1996 and left office that June.

== Career ==
Nurul Alam is a presidium member of the Liberal Democratic Party. He was previously associated with the Bangladesh Nationalist Party. He was elected a member of parliament for the Chittagong-7 constituency as an independent candidate in the sixth parliamentary election on 15 February 1996.

Alam was defeated in the fifth parliamentary elections of 1991, the seventh parliamentary elections of 12 June 1996, and the 11th general elections of 2018.
