= Zara Jabeen Mahbub =

Bangladeshi politician

- জারা জেবীন মাহবুব
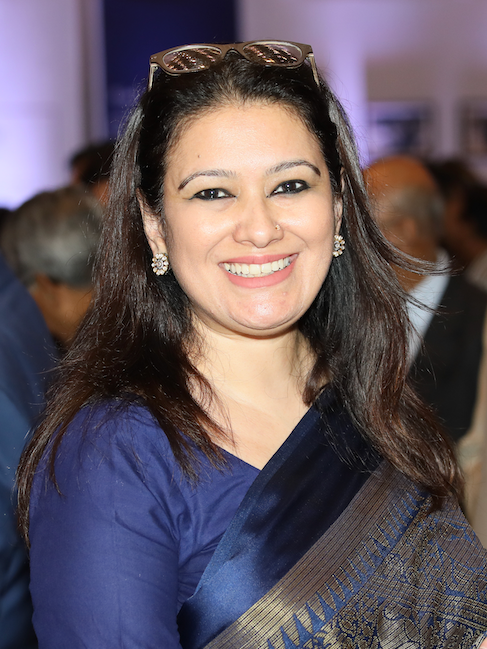
- Mahbub at US Embassy Dhaka (2023)

Member of the Bangladesh Parliament for Reserved Women's Seat-7
- In office 28 February 2024 – 6 August 2024
- Preceded by: Naheed Ezaher Khan
- Succeeded by: Bilkis Islam

Personal details
- Born: Zara Jabeen Chowdhury; 8 March 1976 (age 50)
- Party: Awami League
- Spouse: Naveed Mahbub (m. 1998)
- Relatives: Murtaza Raza Choudhry (grandfather); Mainur Reza Chowdhury (uncle); Najma Chowdhury (aunt)
- Education: Haas School of Business; North South University

Zara Jabeen Mahbub (née Chowdhury, born 8 March 1976) is a Bangladeshi corporate executive and politician. As of January 2023, Mahbub is the CEO of Dun and Bradstreet Data and Analytics Pvt Ltd. Prior to this, she joined Brac Bank in March 2009 and went on to become their head of communication and service quality in 2015. She is a former 12th Jatiya Sangsad member elected for the Reserved Women's Seat-7 (covering Chapainawabganj) served in 2024 representing Bangladesh Awami League.

== Background and early life ==
Zara Jabeen Chowdhury was born on 8 March 1976 in the village of Monakosha in Rajshahi district (now in Chapai Nawabganj District) in Bangladesh. She belongs to an aristocratic Bengali family of Muslim Chowdhuries who served as the former Zamindars of Monakosha. Her grandfather, Murtaza Raza Choudhry, was a former finance minister of East Pakistan and a member of the 1st National Assembly of Pakistan. Her great-great-grandfather, Ismail Hossain Choudhry, was the zamindar of Kotalpokhar in Bihar. She was the niece of Chief Justice Mainur Reza Chowdhury.

Chowdhury's father, Qayum Reza Chowdhury, is a businessman and educationist. He was a treasurer in 2018 and chairperson in 2016-2017 of the board of trustees of the University of Asia Pacific in 2018, a former president of Bangladesh Garment Buying House Association (BGBHA) in 2005. Qayum was a defense witness of the 2013 trial of Salauddin Quader Chowdhury at the International Crimes Tribunal-1 on charges of crimes against humanity, genocide, abetment and complicity to commit crimes. Salauddin was his first cousin.

In the early 1990s, Chowdhury got into fashion and modeling with the help of her relative, Nasrine Karim, daughter of Humayun Rashid Choudhury. She appeared in television commercials for Lipton Tea, 7UP and Meril Toothpaste made by East Asiatic Advertising Agency and Prochar.

Chowdhury was schooled in Happy Times - a nursery school in Dhanmondi, Willes Little Flower School and South Breeze School. She then went to the Assumption University in Bangkok but returned to Dhaka after two and a half years because of her father's health concerns. She then graduated from the North South University (NSU) with a BBA in marketing and international business management in 1998. While a student of NSU, she worked in her father’s business, Knit & Weave Fashions, one of the oldest garments buying houses in Bangladesh.

== Career ==
Chowdhury married Naveed Mahbub in 1998 and moved to Michigan, US and first worked for iQuest Consultants Inc. Moving to San Diego, California in 2002, she first worked for an electronic manufacturing start-up developing software, designing graphical user interfaces, and marketing. She received her MBA from the Haas School of Business of California University Berkeley with focus on strategic marketing and entrepreneurship in May 2008.

In 2008, Mahbub moved to Dhaka with her family. She joined BRAC Bank as a vice president and head of service quality in March 2009. In October 2010, she became the head of their premium banking division. In 2013, she was appointed the head of marketing and call centre at the retail banking division.

Mahbub was elected to the Jatiya Sangsad as an Awami League candidate from a women's reserved seat after the 2024 Bangladeshi general election.

== Personal life ==
Mahbub has two daughters, Zaina (age 20–21) and Maryam (age 13–14), and one son, Niyam (age 9–10).
