= Rahimunnessa =

Bengali Muslim poet

- রহিমুন্নেসা
- Pronunciation: Rohimunnisa
- Born: c. 1763; Shulakbahar, Chittagong
- Died: 1800 (aged 36–37)
- Known for: Laily-Majnu, Payar Chhanda
- Spouse: Ahmad Ali Choudhury
- Relatives: Fazlul Qadir Chaudhry (great-grandson); Fazlul Kabir Chowdhury (great-grandson)

Rahimunnessa (Bengali: রহিমুন্নেসা; 1763–1800) was an 18th-century Bengali Muslim poet. She wrote poetry in medieval Bengali, notable works of hers include a Bengali translation of the Persian Laily Majnu and the poem Payar Chhanda.

== Biography ==
Rahimunnessa was born in Shulukbahar, Chittagong, Bengal and had three siblings; Abdul Jabbar, Abdus Sattar and Abdul Ghaffar. She was born into a Bengali Muslim family descended from an Arab tribe of Quraysh. Her forefathers accompanied Husayn ibn Ali to Karbala and fought alongside him. Following the defeat, they moved to a place near Baghdad before migrating to Munger in Bihar, where they played important military roles. Jali Shah, her grandfather, fled to take refuge in Chittagong after revolting against the British in Bihar. Her father, Abdul Qadir Shah, died when she was very young and she was cared for by her mother, Alimunnesa, who ensured that she received a good education. She was home taught by her mother, as well as her brother Abdul Ghaffar who was an alim, or she may have attended the local maktab. She would have learnt Islamic theology from studying the Qur'an and become proficient in Bengali, Persian and Arabic. She was at one time taught by Abul Husayn of Patiya, and later wrote a tribute to him in one of her poems.

Her mother arranged her marriage to Ahmad Ali Choudhury, a local dignitary and eldest son of Zamindar Jan Ali Choudhury of Mekhal, Hathazari, where Rahimunnessa found much happiness. They had two daughters; Sameyan Khatun and Durdana Khatun, as well as one son; Siddiq Ahmad Choudhury. Rahimunnessa's granddaughter, Begum Fatema Khatun Choudhury, was the mother of the former acting president of Pakistan Fazlul Qadir Chaudhry and parliamentarian Fazlul Kabir Chowdhury.

== Legacy ==
Rahimunnessa's works were lost until being rediscovered by Enamul Haq in the 20th century, and further research by Muhammad Shahidullah. During Huq's tenure as a lecturer at Chittagong College, he received a manuscript from a retired college lecturer named Sirajul Huq. Although initially the manuscript was considered Syed Alaol's famous epic poem Padmavati, further investigation revealed that it was a transliteration of the poem written by the medieval female poet by Rahimunnesa. At the end of the transliterated work, she lyrically wrote about her own life history.

Her work provides the rare voice of Muslim women of that era. Her life and family history narrates the fall of Nawab Siraj; and the plight of the people following the war, which led to the migration of the family from Munger to Chittagong.
