= Golam Akbar Khondakar =

Bangladeshi politician

- গোলাম আকবর খোন্দকার

Member of Parliament
- In office 15 February 1996 – 12 June 1996
- Preceded by: Salahuddin Quader Chowdhury
- Succeeded by: Giasuddin Quader Chowdhury
- Constituency: Chittagong-6

Personal details
- Born: Raozan, Chittagong, East Pakistan now Bangladesh
- Party: Bangladesh Nationalist Party
- Children: Galib Akbar Khondakar
- Occupation: politician, diplomat

Golam Akbar Khondakar is a politician from Chittagong District of Bangladesh. He was elected a member of parliament from Chittagong-6 in February 1996.

== Personal life ==
Khondaker was a member of the University of Chittagong's syndicate. He was appointed as Bangladesh's ambassador to Oman in 2005.

== Career ==
Khondaker is seeking the Bangladesh Nationalist Party's nomination for the Chittagong-6 seat in the 2026 Bangladeshi general election.
