= Murtaza Reza Chowdhury =

Pakistani politician

Finance Minister of East Bengal

Member of the National Assembly of Pakistan

Member of the East Bengal Legislative Assembly

Personal details
- Born: Nawabganj, Malda district, Bengal Presidency
- Died: 10 October 1958
- Children: 10 including Mainur Reza Chowdhury
- Relatives: Najma Chowdhury (daughter-in-law); Zara Jabeen Mahbub (granddaughter)

Murtaza Reza Chowdhury (died on 10 October 1958) was a Pakistani politician who was a member of the first Constituent Assembly of Pakistan as a representative of East Pakistan.

== Early life and family ==
Chowdhury was born into an aristocratic Bengali Muslim family known as the Zamindars of Monakosha in Nawabganj, Malda district (now in present-day Bangladesh). His father, Jehad Ahmad Chowdhury, was the zamindar of Monakosha. His paternal grandfather, Ismail Hossain Chowdhury, was the zamindar of Kotalpukur in Bihar.

Chowdhury married Syeda Roqeya Akhtar, a daughter of Syed Azizullah and Syeda Ammatul Ela Raziya Khatun. They had six daughters, Gaityara, Georgina, Farhadi, Munira and Robaiya, and four sons, Mainur, Kamran, Shahed, Qayum and Irteza. Mainur became the 12th Chief Justice of Bangladesh and served as an adviser at the caretaker government of Bangladesh. Qayum is a businessman and his daughter is Zara Jabeen Mahbub. Irteza is a banker.

Chowdhury's sister-in-law, Syeda Selima Begum, was the wife of Fazlul Qadir Chaudhry.

== Career ==
Chowdhury was a member of the Constituent Assembly of Pakistan. He served as the State Minister of Finance in the Ministry of Talents.

Chowdhury had served as deputy high commissioner to Kolkata. He founded the Humayun Reza High School in Chapainawabganj and the Brothers Union Club in Dhaka.
