= Mainur Reza Chowdhury =

12th Chief Justice of Bangladesh

- মাইনুর রেজা চৌধুরী

12th Chief Justice of Bangladesh
- In office 18 June 2002 – 22 June 2003
- Appointed by: Muhammad Jamiruddin Sircar
- President: Muhammad Jamiruddin Sircar; Iajuddin Ahmed
- Prime Minister: Khaleda Zia
- Preceded by: Mahmudul Amin Choudhury
- Succeeded by: Khondokar Mahmud Hasan

Personal details
- Born: 23 June 1938 Nawabganj, Malda district, Bengal Presidency
- Died: 26 June 2004 (aged 66) Dhaka, Bangladesh
- Spouse: Najma Chowdhury (m. 1942–2021)
- Parent: Murtaza Raza Choudhry (father)
- Relatives: Fazlul Qadir Chaudhry (uncle); Zara Jabeen Mahbub (niece)

Mainur Reza Chowdhury (23 June 1938 – 26 June 2004) was a Bangladeshi jurist who served as the 12th Chief Justice of Bangladesh between 18 June 2002 and 22 June 2003. He was appointed to the role by former President Badruddoza Chowdhury.

== Early life and family ==
Chowdhury was born on 23 June 1938 to an aristocratic Bengali Muslim family known as the Zamindars of Monakosha in Nawabganj, Malda district, Bengal Presidency. His father, Murtaza Raza Choudhry, was a former Finance Minister of East Pakistan and a member of the 1st National Assembly of Pakistan. His great-grandfather, Ismail Hossain Choudhry, was the zamindar of Kotalpukur in Bihar. Chowdhury's mother, Syeda Roqeya Akhtar, belonged to the Syeds of Taraf that had relocated to Comilla. His maternal aunt, Syeda Selena Akhtar, was the wife of politician Fazlul Qadir Chaudhry.

== Career ==
Chowdhury was appointed a Supreme Court judge in 1990 and was elevated to the appellate division in 2000.

== Personal life ==
Chowdhury was married to Najma Chowdhury, an academic.
