= Nutan Chandra Singha =

Bangladeshi businessman

Nutan Chandra Sinha was a Bangladeshi businessman who was killed in the Bangladesh Liberation war and is considered a martyr in Bangladesh.

== Early life ==
Sinha was born on 1 December 1900 in Gohira, Raozan Upazila, Chittagong, Bengal Presidency, British Raj, (now Bangladesh). He studied in Jagatpur Purnananda Asram.

== Career ==
Sinha moved to Arakan in British Burma with his father seeking economic opportunities. There he opened a grocery store and went on to expand into manufacturing. They manufactured soap and then pharmaceuticals. The father-son duo made a fortune in manufacturing in Arakan. He made a pilgrimage to the Bihar Kundadham Temple and after he returned he established Kundeswari Temple in Chittagong. He established the Sree Kundeswari Aushadhalaya Ayurvedic medicine factory in Gahira on 1946. He would establish Kundeswari Primary School and Kundeswari girls school in 1960; and Kundeswari Mahila College in 1970. He also built a post office.

== Death and legacy ==
Bangladesh Liberation war started with the launch of Operation Searchlight by Pakistan Army on 25 March 1971. After Pakistan Army attacked Chittagong University Singha hid and helped a number of faculty to escape to India. After Pakistan Army regained control of Chittagong, they and the paramilitary razakar attacked his residence on 13 April 1971 and killed him. On 2013 Bangladesh Nationalist Party politician and former member of Razzakars Salahuddin Quader Chowdhury was sentenced to death by the International Crimes Tribunal for his role in the death of Singha. Salauddin Quader Chowdhury was executed in 2016.
