= Raozan Upazila =

Upazila in Chattogram Division, Bangladesh

Raozan Upazila রাউজান উপজেলা
- Upazila
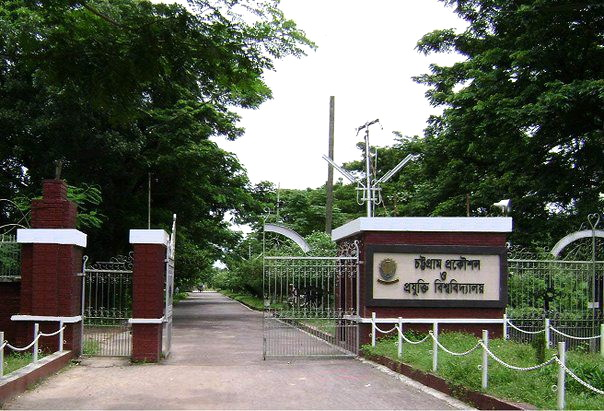
- Entrance to the Chittagong University of Engineering and Technology

- Map of Raozan in Chattogram district
- Coordinates: 22°32′N 91°56′E
- Country: Bangladesh
- Division: Chittagong
- District: Chittagong
- Jatiya Sangsad constituency: Chittagong-6
- Headquarters: Raozan Upazila Complex

Government
  - Body: Upazila Council
  - MP: Vacant
  - Chairman: Vacant
  - Chief Executive Officer: Angyajai Marma

Area
  - Total: 246.58 km^{2} (95.21 sq mi)

Population (2022)
  - Total: 396,358
  - Density: 1,607.4/km^{2} (4,163.2/sq mi)
- Time zone: UTC+6 (BST)
- Post code: 4340
- Area code: 03026
- National Calling Code: +880
- Website: raozan.chittagong.gov.bd

Raozan Upazila mauza geocode map

Raozan Upazila (Bengali: রাউজান উপজেলা) is an upazila of Chattogram District, in Chattogram Division, Bangladesh. It was established in August, 1947.

== Geography ==
Raozan has 63,375 households and a total area of 246.58 km^{2}.

The two main rivers are Karnaphuli and Halda.

Raozan is surrounded by Fatikchhari Upazila on the north, Boalkhali Upazila and Karnafuli river on the south, Rangunia and Kawkhali (Rangamati) Upazilas on the east, and Hathazari and Fatikchhari Upazila on the west.

The river Karnaphuli flows on the south side of the Raozan Upazila and the Halda river flows on the west side.

== Demographics ==
Religions in Raozan Upazila (2022)
Religion	Percent
Islam	76.35%
Hinduism	16.90%
Buddhism	6.71%
Other or not stated	0.04%

According to the 2022 Bangladeshi census, Raozan Upazila had 88,071 households and a population of 396,358. 10.14% of the population were under 5 years of age. Raozan had a literacy rate (age 7 and over) of 84.87%: 86.40% for males and 83.50% for females, and a sex ratio of 91.78 males for every 100 females. 118,775 (29.97%) lived in urban areas.

According to the 1991 Bangladesh census, during that time Raozan had a population of 274,344 people. Males constituted 50.58% of the population, while females constituted about 49.42% of the population. The average literacy rate is 52.5% (7+ years), above the national average of 32.4%.

== Administration ==
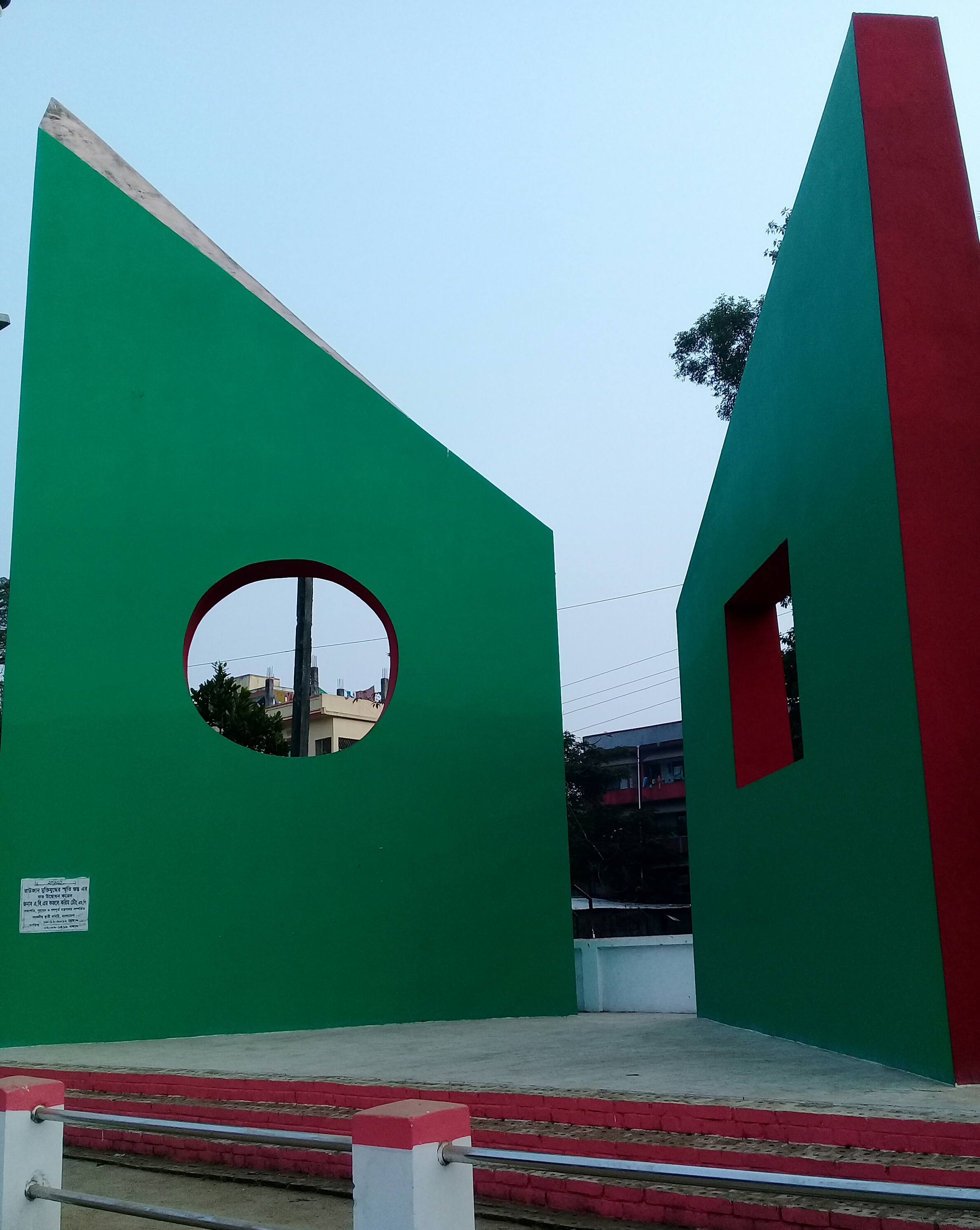
Raozan Monument

The Raozan Upazila is divided into Raozan Municipality and 14 union parishads which are Bagoan, Binajuri, Chikdair, Dabua, Gahira, Haladia, Kadalpur, Noajispur, Noapara, Pahartali, Paschim Guzara, Purba Guzara, Raozan, and Urkirchar. The union parishads are subdivided into 64 mauzas and 66 villages.

Raozan Municipality is subdivided into 9 wards and 17 mahallas.

== Health centres ==
Raozan has two health complexes and some private hospitals.

== Education ==
The upazila has three universities, three graduate colleges, three higher secondary colleges, four schools and colleges, two Kamil madrasha, four Fazil madrasha, four alim madrasha, 12 Dakhil madrasha, five MPo Dakhil madrasha, 48 student secondary schools, three girls' secondary schools, nine lower secondary schools, and 177 government primary schools, community schools, and kindergartens.

=== Universities ===
- Chittagong University of Engineering & Technology (CUET)

=== Colleges ===
- Raozan Government College
- Noapara Degree Collage
- Gohira Degree College
- Hazrat Yasin Shah Public College
- Hazi Badsha Mabeya College
- Imam Gazzali College
- Ashalata College
- Kundeswari Girls' College
- Agrasara Girls' College
- CUET School & College

== Notable residents ==
- A. B. M. Fazle Karim Chowdhury, a member of Parliament for constituency Chittagong-6 2001–2006 and for Chittagong-5 from 2009 to 2014, and MP for Chittagong-6 again since 2014
- A. B. M. Mohiuddin Chowdhury, mayor of Chittagong (1994–2010), born at Gohira village in 1944
- Abdul Haq Choudhury, writer, researcher, Ekushey Padak laureate, born in Raozan in 1922
- Abdullah Al Noman, the former Minister of Fisheries
- Benimadhab Barua, a scholar of ancient Indian languages, Buddhism and law, born at Mahamuni village in 1888
- Ambika Chakrabarty
- Fazlul Qadir Chaudhry, Speaker of the Pakistan National Assembly (1963–1965), born at Gohira village in 1919
- Giasuddin Quader Chowdhury, a former Member of Parliament
- Mahbub Ul Alam Choudhury, writer, born at Gohira village in 1927
- Nabinchandra Sen, poet, born at Noapara village in 1847
- Nutan Chandra Singha, businessman, born at Gohira village in 1990
- Shahid Mahmud Jangi, renowned lyricist, writer and an art collector. He was the founding convener and later was elected as the first president of Bangladesh lyricist association.
- Salahuddin Quader Chowdhury, an executed war criminal and Member of Parliament, born at Gohira village in 1949
- Shabana, film actress
- Sukumar Barua, poet
- Surya Sen, an anti-British revolutionary, born at Noapara village in 1894
- Syed Wahidul Alam, Member of Parliament for constituency Chittagong-5 1991–2006
- Ziauddin Ahmed Bablu, Jatiya Party Member of Parliament
- Daulat Qazi, poet
- Farid Ahmad Choudhury, member of Bengal Legislative Assembly

== See also ==
- Upazilas of Bangladesh
- Districts of Bangladesh
- Divisions of Bangladesh
