= Najma Chowdhury =

Bangladeshi academic (1942–2021)

- নাজমা চৌধুরী
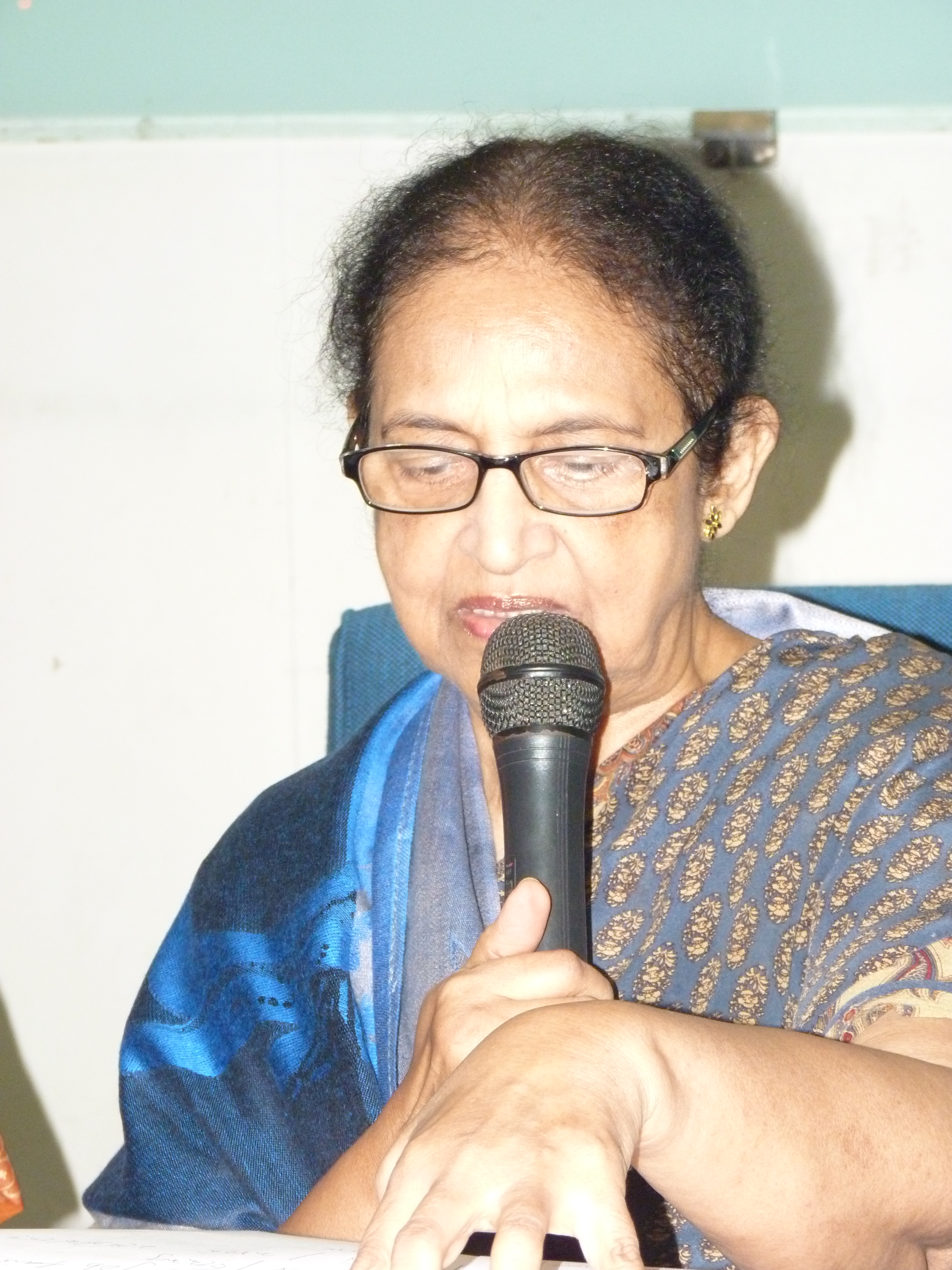
- Chowdhury in 2012

Adviser for Women and Children Affairs
- In office 31 March 1996 – 23 June 1996
- Chief Adviser: Muhammad Habibur Rahman
- Succeeded by: Mozammel Hossain

Personal details
- Born: 26 February 1942 Sylhet, Assam Province, British Raj
- Died: 8 August 2021 (aged 79) Dhaka, Bangladesh
- Spouse: Mainur Reza Chowdhury
- Relatives: Murtaza Raza Choudhry (father-in-law); Fazlul Qadir Chaudhry (uncle-in-law); Zara Jabeen Mahbub (niece)
- Education: University of Dhaka; SOAS, University of London
- Occupation: Academic
- Awards: Ekushey Padak (2008)

Najma Chowdhury (26 February 1942 – 8 August 2021) was a Bangladeshi academic. She served as the adviser to the Habib administration.

She was a pioneer in establishing women's studies in Bangladesh. She founded the Women and Gender Studies department of the University of Dhaka in 2000. She was an adviser to the first caretaker government in 1996. She was awarded the Ekushey Padak, Bangladesh's second-highest civilian honour, for research in 2008.

== Early life and education ==
Chowdhury was born on 26 February 1942 to a Bengali Muslim family in Sylhet. She was the third child of Chowdhury Imamuzzaman and Amirunnesa Khatun after the death of their first two children. Her mother, Amurunnesa Khatun, was a homemaker, while her father, Chowdhury Imamuzzaman, was a civil engineer. Her father was from the Chowdhury Bari of Pitua-Sadrabad in Nabiganj. They were descendants of Shah Sadruddin Qureshi, who is claimed to be a Qurayshite associate of Shah Jalal who partook in the Conquest of Sylhet in 1303.

== Education ==
Her early schooling was in Assam, then in British India. The family moved to Dhaka, East Pakistan, when her father found a new job after independence from Britain when East Pakistan separated from India.

Chowdhury was admitted in class three into Bidya Mandir School in Dhaka. Then again, in class four, she was admitted into PN Girls' School in Rajshahi. She passed her SSC entrance exam from Kamrunnesa Girls' School in 1956. She stood eighth among girls in the East Pakistan Secondary Education Board. She passed her HSC from Holy Cross College, Dhaka. She stood ninth in the merit list in the East Pakistan Higher Secondary Education Board.

Chowdhury completed her graduation and post-graduation in political science at the University of Dhaka. She played guitar for Bangladesh Betar before going to the United Kingdom for her PhD.

== Career ==
=== Academic ===
Chowdhury started her career as a lecturer in the political science department of the University of Dhaka in 1963. In 1966, she went on a Commonwealth Scholarship to the School of Oriental and African Studies at the University of London to obtain her PhD. She returned to Bangladesh in 1972 and was the chairperson of the political science department from 1984 to 1987. During her tenure in the department, she introduced courses related to women's empowerment and development into the curriculum. She also established the Centre for Women Studies, a research centre within the university.

Chowdhury served as a visiting scholar at the University of Minnesota in 1988 under a Fulbright fellowship for three months. She was a friend of political scientist Barbara J. Nelson. The duo edited a book, Women and Politics Worldwide, in 1994, published by Yale University Press. The book won the Victoria Schuck Award in 1995. The American Political Science Association called the book the best book for 1994.

She served as Bangladesh's representative at the United Nations General Assembly in 1978 and 1986. During this period she was also a participant at the UNESCO General Conference in Belgrade in 1980, the World Conference on Women in Nairobi in 1985, and the Fourth World Conference on Women in Beijing in 1995.

She helped establish the Women and Gender Studies department at the University of Dhaka in 2000. Chowdhury joined the department as a professor in 2003 and later served as chairperson. She was also professor emeritus at the university. Through her contributions to women's empowerment and development studies, she was considered an inspiration for the women of Bangladesh. Her 2010 book Of Mangroves and Monsters chronicled women's participation in Bangladesh's political institutions and policy-making bodies and explored their peripheral involvement and marginalisation. She used this to study the paradoxical nature of women's participation despite having women as the country's heads of government for over two decades. Her research further studied systemic discrimination within institutions that disadvantaged women across professions and across cultures and class divides.

=== Politics and non-profit ===
Chowdhury served as an advisor in the first caretaker government led by Muhammad Habibur Rahman in 1996. She served in the Ministry of Women and Children and the Ministry of Social Welfare, Labour and Manpower. She was also the president of Women for Women International and a founding member of the Human Development Foundation.

== Awards ==
Chowdhury received Ekushey Padak, Bangladesh's second-highest civilian honour, for her outstanding contributions to research in 2008. She was also awarded the "Rokeya Chair" in 2007 by the University Grants Commission.

== Personal life ==
In 1961, Chowdhury married Mainur Reza Chowdhury, son of the former Finance Minister Murtaza Raza Choudhry of the Monakosha zamindar family. Chowdhury was a student of the English department at the University of Dhaka at that time. He later went on to become the Chief Justice of Bangladesh. He died in 2004. The couple had two daughters, Lamiya Chowdhury and Bushra Hasina Chowdhury. The latter is a teacher with Dhaka University's International Relations department.

Chowdhury died on 8 August 2021, at a hospital in Dhaka from COVID-19. She was 79. She is buried at the Banani graveyard in Dhaka.

== Published works ==
- Caudhurī, Nājamā; Nelson, Barbara J. (1994). Women and Politics Worldwide. New Haven: Yale University Press. ISBN 0-300-05407-6. OCLC 28508284.
- Caudhurī, Nājamā (2010). Of Mangroves and Monsters: Women's Political Participation and Women's Studies in Bangladesh. University of Dhaka. Department of Women and Gender Studies. Dhaka: Pathak Shamabesh. ISBN 978-984-8866-15-3. OCLC 702165807.
