= Humam Quader Chowdhury =

Bangladeshi politician

- হুমাম কাদের চৌধুরী
- Chowdhury in 2026

Member of the Bangladesh Parliament for Chittagong-7
- Incumbent
- Assumed office 17 February 2026
- Preceded by: Muhammad Hasan Mahmud

Personal details
- Born: 1982 or 1983 (age 43–44)
- Party: Bangladesh Nationalist Party
- Relations: A. K. M. Fazlul Quader Chowdhury (grandfather)
- Parent: Salahuddin Quader Chowdhury (father)
- Relatives: Chowdhuries of Chittagong
- Occupation: Politician

Humam Quader Chowdhury (Bengali: হুমাম কাদের চৌধুরী) is a Bangladesh Nationalist Party (BNP) politician and elected member of parliament from the Chittagong-7 (Rangunia) constituency. He is the youngest son of late BNP leader and member of parliament Salahuddin Quader Chowdhury.
