= Gohira Degree College =

- গহিরা ডিগ্রী কলেজ°
- Type: Private
- Established: 1968
- Founders: Mahbub Ul Alam Choudhury
- Location: Gohira, Raozan Upazila, Chittagong District, Bangladesh; 22.5217°N 91.8693°E
- Website: gohiracollege.edu.bd

Gohira Degree College (Bengali: গহিরা ডিগ্রী কলেজ) is a private, pass-level degree college in Raozan Upazila, Chittagong District, Bangladesh. It was founded in 1968 by writer Mahbub Ul Alam Choudhury.

The campus is located on the south side of the Chittagong-Rangamati Highway in Gohira. The college sports ground was selected as the site for the construction of Sheikh Russell Mini Stadium in 2017. Another project underway is the construction of a BDT 12.1 million (US$150,000) four-story information technology building, as of 2017.

The college transitioned to an online admissions process in 2015.
