= Nazrul Islam (Chittagong politician) =

Bangladeshi politician

Member of Bangladesh Parliament

Member of Parliament for Chittagong-11
- In office 1979–1982
- Preceded by: Nurul Islam Chowdhury
- Succeeded by: Chowdhury Harunur Rashid

Member of Parliament for Chittagong-7
- In office 1988–1990
- Preceded by: Giasuddin Quader Chowdhury
- Succeeded by: Md Yousuf

Personal details
- Born: 1927 Patiya, Bengal Presidency, British India
- Died: 24 November 2011 (aged 83–84)
- Party: Jatiya Party
- Other political affiliations: Bangladesh Nationalist Party

Nazrul Islam is a former politician of Chittagong District of Bangladesh and member of parliament for Chittagong-11 and Chittagong-7.

== Biography ==
Nazrul Islam was born in 1927 in what is now Patiya, Chittagong District, Bangladesh.

Islam was elected to parliament from Chittagong-11 as a Bangladesh Nationalist Party candidate in 1979. He was elected to parliament from Chittagong-7 as a Jatiya Party candidate in 1988.

He died on 24 November 2011.
