= Ziauddin Ahmed Bablu =

Bangladeshi politician (1954–2021)

- জিয়া উদ্দীন আহমেদ বাবলু
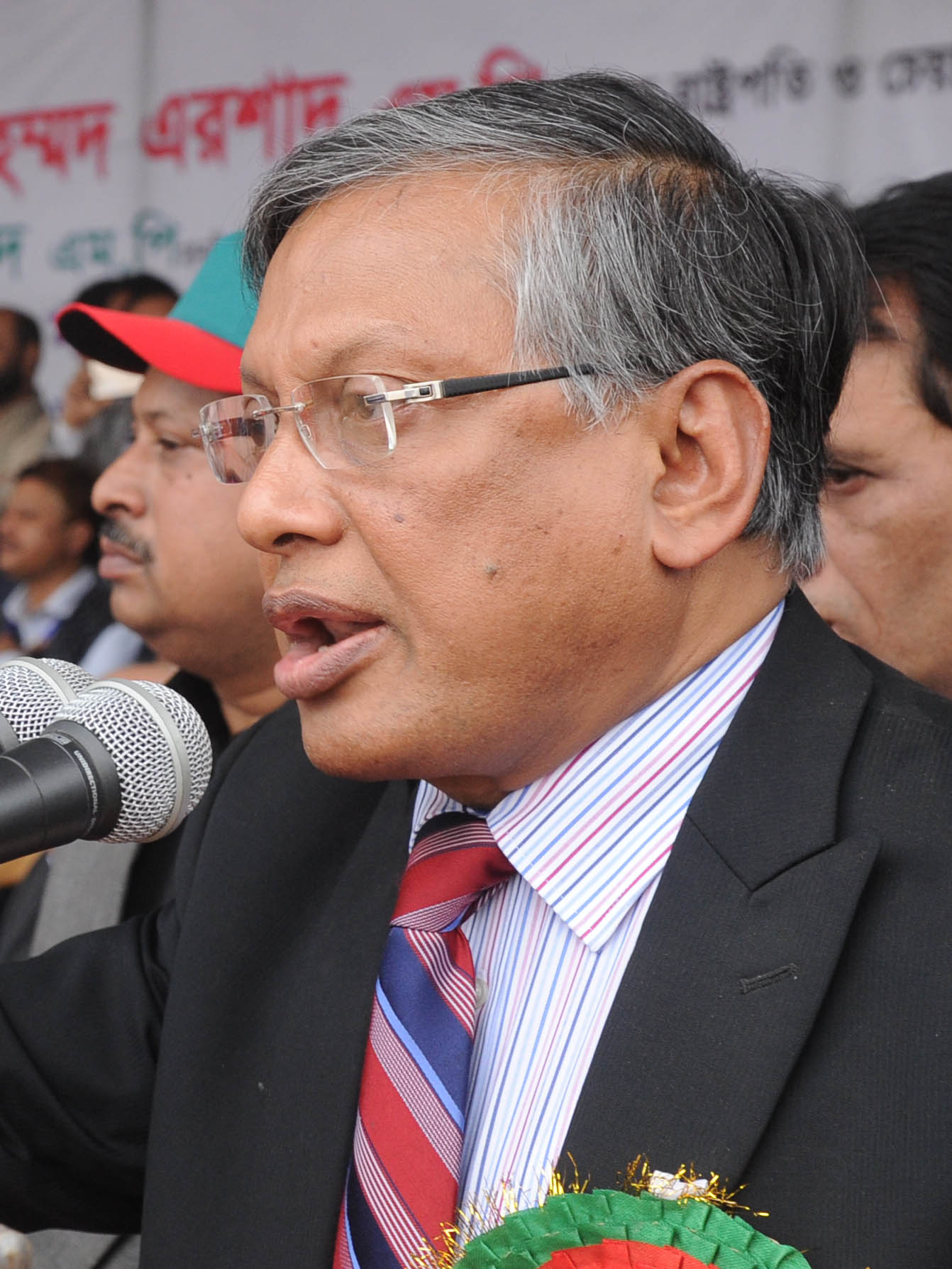
- Bablu in 2015

General Secretary of Jatiya Party
- In office 26 July 2020 – 2 October 2021
- Preceded by: Mashiur Rahaman Ranga
- Succeeded by: Mujibul Haque
- In office April 2014 – 29 January 2016
- Preceded by: Ruhul Amin Howlader

Member of Parliament
- In office 29 January 2014 – 28 January 2019
- Preceded by: Nurul Islam
- Succeeded by: Mohibul Hasan Chowdhury
- Constituency: Chittagong-9
- In office 15 April 1988 – 6 December 1990
- Preceded by: Salahuddin Quader Chowdhury
- Succeeded by: Salahuddin Quader Chowdhury
- Constituency: Chittagong-6

Personal details
- Born: 31 December 1954 Chittagong, East Bengal, Dominion of Pakistan
- Died: 2 October 2021 (aged 66) Dhaka, Bangladesh
- Party: Jatiya Party
- Spouses: Farida Sarkar (m. 2005, died); Mehe Zebunnesa Rahman (m. 2017)
- Parents: Abul Qashem Chowdhury (father); Noor Mahal Begum (mother)
- Education: University of Dhaka

Ziauddin Ahmed Bablu (31 December 1954 – 2 October 2021) was a Bangladeshi politician of the Jatiya Party and served as the Secretary General for two terms. He was a Jatiya Sangsad member representing the Chittagong-9 constituency at the 10th Jatiya Sangsad and the Chittagong-6 constituency at the 4th Jatiya Sangsad. He served as the Cabinet Minister for Energy during Ershad's regime in the 1980s. He was appointed an advisor to the Prime Minister Sheikh Hasina in November 2013.

== Early life ==
Bablu was born on 31 December 1954 to parents Abul Qashem Chowdhury and Noor Mahal Begum in Chittagong. He completed his Higher Secondary School Certificate from Notre Dame College, Dhaka. He held a bachelor's and master's from the University of Dhaka in English Literature, and a Bachelor of Laws from the same institution.

== Career ==
Active in student government from a young age, Ahmed served as the General Secretary of the English Departmental Association of Dhaka University from 1974 to 1975. From 1979 to 1983, Bablu was a member of the Dhaka University Senate and from 1981 to 1983, he was the General Secretary of Bangladesh Chhatra League. During that time he also served as the General Secretary of Dhaka University Central Students Union.

In 1984, he became an Advisor to the Chancellor on Student Affairs of the Bangladeshi government. In 1985, Bablu was appointed the Deputy Minister for Education in the cabinet of President Hussain Muhammad Ershad. He held that post until 1986 when he was made the Deputy Minister for Ports and Shipping in the Government of Bangladesh. He was made the State Minister for Finance in 1987. From 1987 to 1988, he served as the Cabinet Minister in charge of Civil Aviation and Tourism.

From 1988 to 1990, Bablu was the Cabinet Minister of Power and Energy. He also served as an Advisor to Prime Minister Sheikh Hasina from 2013 to 2014, with the rank and status of a Cabinet Minister.

Bablu was first elected as a Member of Parliament (Bangladesh) to the Jatiya Sangsad in 1988 from the Chittagong-7 constituency. He was elected to his second term in Parliament from Chittagong-9 in 2014.

Bablu served as the Secretary General of the Jatiya Party from 2014 to 2016. He was appointed Special Assistant to chairperson of Jatiya Party Hussain Muhammed Ershad.

In 2020, Bablu was nominated by the Jatiya Party to contest the elections in Chittagong-8. The seat became vacant after the incumbent, Moin Uddin Khan Badal, died. He withdrew his candidacy before the start of the election on instructions from his party. Subsequently, Moslem Uddin Ahmad was elected to parliament from Chittagong-8 as a candidate of Awami League.

From 2014 to 2016, Bablu served as the first General Secretary of the Jatiya Party while former President Hussain Muhammad Ershad was chairman. On 26 July 2020 he was elected to a second term as Secretary General of the Jatiya Party.

Bablu accused the Awami League led government of harassing activists of the Jatiya Party in Narayanganj after a resort was vandalized by supporters of Mamunul Haque, leader of Hefazat-e-Islam Bangladesh on 21 April 2021.

== Personal life ==
Bablu's first wife Farida Sarkar died in 2005 from cancer. They had a son, Ashik Ahmed. In April 2017, Bablu married Dr. Mehe Zebunnesa Rahman, who is currently the director of the BBA Programme at North South University. She is the daughter of Merina Rahman, a former Jatiya Party Member of Parliament and the younger sister of Hussain Muhammad Ershad.

On 7 September 2021, Bablu was hospitalized with symptoms of COVID-19 and was tested positive for the viral infection shortly afterwards. While receiving treatment at the Bangladesh Specialized Hospital in Shyamoli, Dhaka, he died on 2 October 2021, at the age of 66. His body was taken to the Jatiya Party's office in Kakrail where party leaders and other colleagues paid their final respects; he was then laid to rest in the Martyred Intellectuals Memorial. A three-day mourning period in his memory was announced by the Jatiya Party.
