= Chittagong-6 =

Constituency of Bangladesh's Jatiya Sangsad

Coordinates: 22.54°N 91.91°E

- Constituency for the Jatiya Sangsad
- District: Chittagong District
- Division: Chittagong Division
- Electorate: 339,988 (2026)

Current constituency
- Created: 1973
- Party: Bangladesh Nationalist Party
- Member: Gias Uddin Quader Chowdhury
- ← 282 Chittagong-5 284 Chittagong-7 →

Chittagong-6 is a constituency represented in the Jatiya Sangsad (National Parliament) of Bangladesh since 2026 by Gias Uddin Quader Chowdhury of the Bangladesh Nationalist Party.

== Boundaries ==
The constituency encompasses Raozan Upazila.

== History ==
The constituency was created for the first general elections in newly independent Bangladesh, held in 1973.

Ahead of the 2008 general election, the Election Commission redrew constituency boundaries to reflect population changes revealed by the 2001 Bangladesh census. The 2008 redistricting altered the boundaries of the constituency.

Ahead of the 2014 general election, the Election Commission renumbered the seat for Chittagong-16 (Sandwip) to Chittagong-3, bumping up by one the suffix of the former constituency of that name and higher numbered constituencies in the district. Thus Chittagong-6 covers the area previously covered by Chittagong-5. Previously Chittagong-6 encompassed Rangunia Upazila and one union parishad of Boalkhali Upazila: Sreepur Kharandwip.

== Members of Parliament ==
Election	Member	Party
1973	Mohammad Khaled	Awami League
1979	A. M. Zahiruddin Khan	Bangladesh Nationalist Party
1986	Salahuddin Quader Chowdhury	Jatiya Party
1988	Ziauddin Ahmed Bablu	Jatiya Party
1991	Salahuddin Quader Chowdhury	National Democratic Party
Feb 1996	Golam Akbar Khondakar	Bangladesh Nationalist Party
Jun 1996	Gias Uddin Quader Chowdhury	Bangladesh Nationalist Party
2001	A.B.M. Fazle Karim Chowdhury	Awami League
Major Boundary Changes
2008	Muhammad Hasan Mahmud	Awami League
Major Boundary Changes
2014	A.B.M. Fazle Karim Chowdhury	Awami League
2018	A.B.M. Fazle Karim Chowdhury	Awami League
2024	A.B.M. Fazle Karim Chowdhury	Awami League
2026	Gias Uddin Quader Chowdhury	Bangladesh Nationalist Party

== Elections ==
=== Elections in the 2020s ===
General Election 2026: Chittagong-6
Party	Candidate	Votes	%	±%
BNP	Gias Uddin Quader Chowdhury	112,237	69.1	N/A
BIF	Mohammad Ilias Nuri	27,146	16.7	N/A
Jamaat	Shahjahan Manju	22,118	13.6	N/A
GSA	Nasir Uddin Talukder	829	0.5	N/A
Majority		85,091	52.4	N/A
Turnout		162,330	47.7	N/A
Registered electors		339,988		
BNP gain from AL				

=== Elections in the 2010s ===
A.B.M. Fazle Karim Chowdhury was elected unopposed in the 2014 general election after opposition parties withdrew their candidacies in a boycott of the election.

=== Elections in the 2000s ===
General Election 2008: Chittagong-6
Party	Candidate	Votes	%	±%
AL	Muhammad Hasan Mahmud	101,340	58.4	+6.3
BNP	Salahuddin Quader Chowdhury	72,073	41.6	−5.4
Majority		29,267	16.9	+11.8
Turnout		173,413	87.4	+17.8
AL hold				

General Election 2001: Chittagong-6
Party	Candidate	Votes	%	±%
AL	A.B.M. Fazle Karim Chowdhury	74,669	52.1	+14.4
BNP	Gias Uddin Quader Chowdhury	67,340	47.0	−5.4
IJOF	Salamat Ali	1,389	1.0	N/A
Majority		7,329	5.1	−9.6
Turnout		143,398	69.6	+2.9
AL gain from BNP				

=== Elections in the 1990s ===
General Election June 1996: Chittagong-6
Party	Candidate	Votes	%	±%
BNP	Gias Uddin Kader Chowdhury	50,059	52.4	+51.0
AL	A.B.M. Fazle Karim Chowdhury	35,993	37.7	+2.0
JP(E)	Zia Uddin Ahmed Chowdhury	6,400	6.7	−0.7
BIF	Abu Nasar Talukdar	1,519	1.6	+0.7
Jamaat	Md. Jamal Hossain	1,504	1.6	N/A
Zaker Party	Md. Yaqul Chowdhury	122	0.1	0.0
Majority		14,066	14.7	−3.7
Turnout		95,597	66.7	+19.2
BNP gain from NDP				

General Election 1991: Chittagong-6
Party	Candidate	Votes	%	±%
NDP	Salahuddin Quader Chowdhury	48,646	54.0	N/A
AL	Abdullah Al Harun	32,105	35.7	N/A
JP(E)	Ziauddin Ahmed Bablu	6,655	7.4	N/A
BNP	Hasan Chowdhury	1,296	1.4	N/A
BIF	Nasir Uddin	853	0.9	N/A
BML	A. F. M. Hasan	199	0.2	N/A
JSD	Nurul Azim	137	0.2	N/A
Zaker Party	Md. Yakub Chowdhury	128	0.1	N/A
Majority		16,541	18.4	N/A
Turnout		90,019	47.5	N/A
NDP gain from JP(E)				
