= Abdul Haq Choudhury =

Bangladeshi writer (1922–1994)

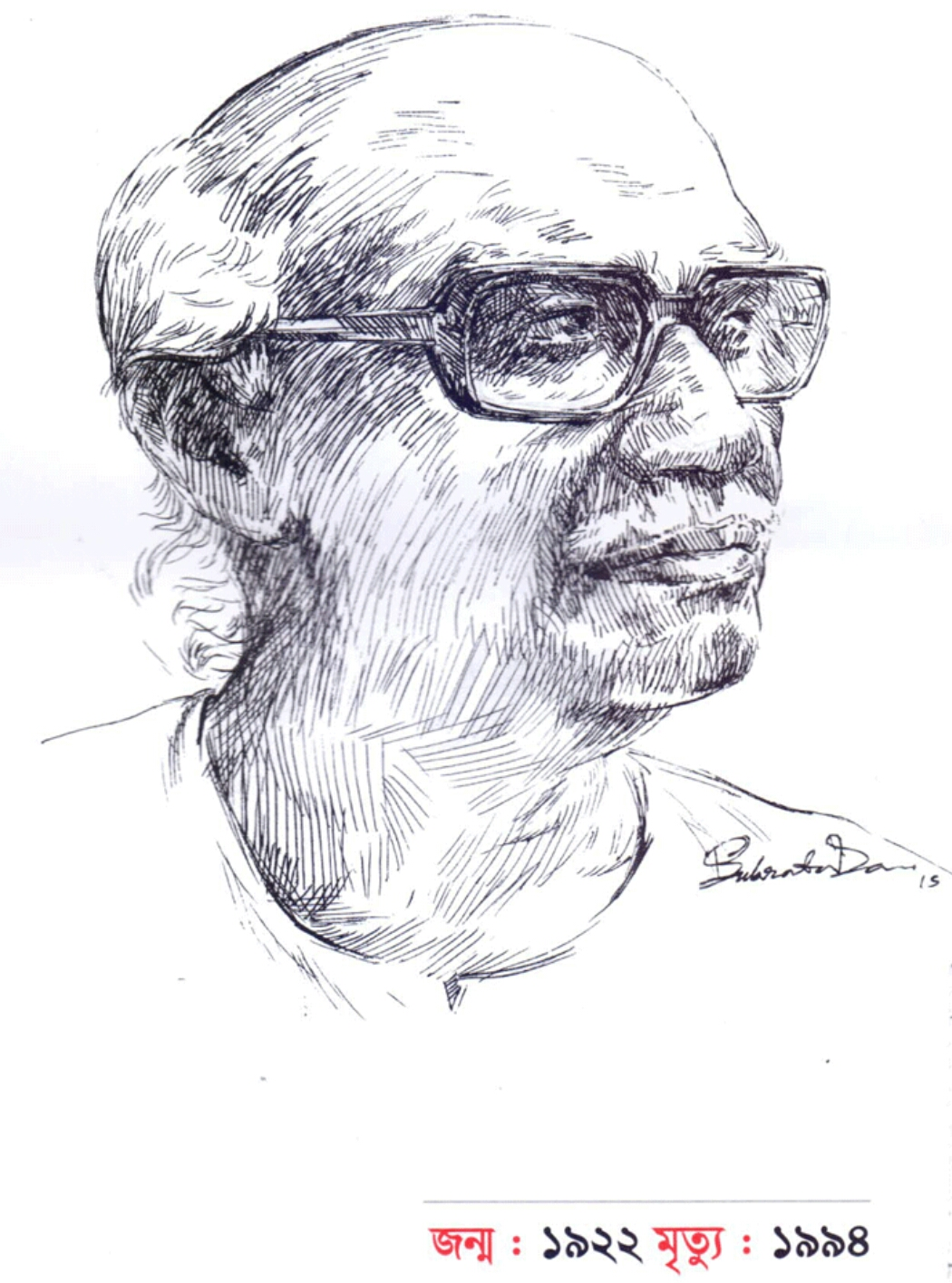
- Born: 1922; Nawazishpur, Raozan, Chittagong District, Bengal Presidency, British India
- Died: 1994 (aged 71–72)
- Other names: Chattaltattvavid

Abdul Haq Choudhury (Bengali: আব্দুল হক চৌধুরী; 1922 – 1994) was a Bangladeshi writer. He was awarded Ekushey Padak in 2011 by the Government of Bangladesh.

== Education and career ==
Choudhury studied in Raozan High School. In 1942 he joined Nawazishpur Primary School, founded by his father, as a teacher. He collected relics of Sultan Nasiruddin Nusrat Shah, Isa Khan, Arakan Fort from Chittagong, Sylhet, Arakan and Tripura.

== Bibliography ==
Choudhury wrote eleven books.

- Chattagramer Itihas Prasanga (1976)
- Chattagramer Samaj O Sangskrtir Ruprekha (1988)
- Sylheter Itihas Prasanga (1981)
- Chattagram-Arakan (1989)
- Prachin Arakan Rohinga Hindu 0 Barua Bauddha Adibasi (1994)
- Chattagramer Charitabhidhan

== Awards ==
- Natun Chandra Singh Memorial Medal (1984)
- Lekhika Sangha Medal (1987)
- Ekushey Padak (2011)
