= A. M. Zahiruddin Khan =

Bangladeshi politician (1936–2005)

- এ এম জহিরুদ্দিন খান

Minister of Planning
- In office March 1991 – January 1993
- Prime Minister: Khaleda Zia
- Preceded by: Rehman Sobhan
- Succeeded by: Muhiuddin Khan Alamgir

Minister of Industries
- In office January 1993 – January 1995
- Prime Minister: Khaleda Zia
- Preceded by: Shamsul Islam Khan
- Succeeded by: Tofail Ahmed

Member of the Bangladesh Parliament for Chittagong-6
- In office 2 April 1979 – 24 March 1982
- Preceded by: Mohammad Khaled
- Succeeded by: Salahuddin Quader Chowdhury

Personal details
- Born: 5 July 1936 Chittagong, Bengal, British India
- Died: 29 March 2005 (aged 69) Bangkok, Thailand
- Party: Bangladesh Nationalist Party
- Spouse: Asma Afzal (m. 1967)
- Children: 4
- Parent: Abul Kashem Khan (father)
- Relatives: Rokia Afzal Rahman (sister in-law) Rehman Sobhan (brother in-law) Farooq Sobhan (brother In-law)

A. M. Zahiruddin Khan (5 July 1936 – 29 March 2005) was a Bangladeshi politician and industrialist. He served as a Jatiya Sangsad member representing the Chittagong-6 constituency during 1979–1982.

== Early life ==
Khan was the eldest son of Abul Kashem Khan, a minister in the central cabinet of the then Pakistan. He studied at St. Paul's School in Darjeeling, India, and later at Aitchison College in Lahore, Pakistan.

== Career ==
In 1958, Khan became the managing director of A K Khan & Company and later the chairman in 1991. He was also the founding chairman of AKTEL and chairman of COATS Bangladesh and Bengal Fisheries Ltd. He was the president of the Chittagong Chamber of Commerce & Industry (CCCI) for two consecutive terms. In 1977 he was elected president of the Federation of Bangladesh Chamber of Commerce & Industry (FBCCI). As president of FBCCI, he initiated the formation of Islamic Chambers of Commerce & Industry. He was also elected chairman of the working group for drafting of the Islamic Chamber of Commerce & Industry Constitution in the Istanbul Conference in 1977. He also participated in the International Labour Organization (ILO) conference in Geneva in 1975 as a representative of Bangladesh employers. He was also chairman of the All Pakistan Textile Mills Association (East Zone) from 1969 to 1971, founder chairman of the Bangladesh Textile Mills Association (BTMA), founder director of Investment Corporation of Bangladesh (ICB) and director of Sadharan Bima Corporation. He also served as chairman of Sonali Bank.

Khan joined politics in 1978 and was also elected a member of parliament (MP) in 1979 from the Bangladesh Nationalist Party (BNP) led by President Ziaur Rahman. He became a member of Begum Khaleda Zia's cabinet in 1991 as the planning minister and later as industries minister.

== Personal life ==
Zahiruddin Khan was married to Asma Afzal, daughter of Barrister Khandkar Ali Afzal, the first Bengali secretary of the Bengal Legislative Assembly.

=== Death ===
Zahiruddin Khan died on 29 March 2005 and was buried on 1 April 2005 with nationwide honor at his family graveyard in Batali Hills, Chittagong. His death was condoled by President Iajuddin Ahmed, Speaker of the Jatiya Sangsad Jamiruddin Sircar, and other prominent members of the government and society.
