= A. K. M. Fazlul Kabir Chowdhury =

Bangladeshi politician

A.K.M. Fazlul Kabir Chowdhury
- এ.কে.এম. ফজলুল কবির চৌধুরী
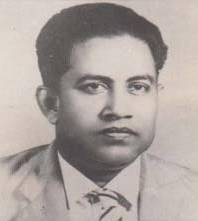

Personal details
- Born: Raozan, Bengal, British India (present-day Raozan, Bangladesh)
- Died: 9 September 1972 Dhaka, Bangladesh
- Party: Independent candidate (1962–1969)
- Relations: A. K. M. Fazlul Quader Chowdhury (brother)
- Children: A.B.M Fazle Rashid Chowdhury A.B.M Fazle Rabbi Chowdhury: A.B.M. Fazle Karim Chowdhury; A.B.M Fazle Hasan Chowdhury A.B.M Fazle Shahid Chowdhury
- Relatives: Chowdhuries of Chittagong
- Education: University of Calcutta

A.K.M. Fazlul Kabir Chowdhury (died on 9 September 1972) was a Bangladeshi politician and businessman. He was a member of parliament as well as leader of the opposition in East Pakistan Provincial Assembly.

== Early life ==
Chowdhury was born in Raozan Upazila, Chittagong. Chowdhury graduated in 1938 from University of Calcutta. He completed a master's degree and law degree there as well.

== Career ==
Chowdhury was elected to the East Pakistan Assembly in 1962. He was the leader of the opposition in the East Pakistan Provincial Assembly. He was the chairman of the legislative committee in the assembly. He was the founder president of Chittagong Chamber of Commerce and industry. He was governor of Marine and Mercantile Academy. He established the Raozan College. He established island of peace in Raozan and in the opening he invited Dominique Pire (Nobel Peace prize 1958) from Belgium.

Chowdhury served in the Chittagong District Council. He was the vice-chairman and later Chairman of Chittagong Port Trust.

== Death ==
Chowdhury died on 9 September 1972 in Dhaka.
