= Naveed Mahbub =

Bangladeshi comedian and columnist

- নাভিদ মাহবুব
- Education: Bangladesh University of Engineering and Technology; University of Michigan, Ann Arbor
- Spouse: Zara Jabeen
- Children: 3

Comedy career
- Medium: Stand-up; television
- Website: naveedmahbub.com

Naveed Mahbub is a Bangladeshi comedian and columnist. He was awarded Best Male Comedian in the 2007 Las Vegas Comedy Festival. In 2016, Mahbub was featured in US-based comedy television channel Comedy Central. He hosts a morning radio show, Good Morning Bangladesh, on ABC Radio. He writes articles on the newspaper The Daily Star.

== Background and education ==
Mahbub was born to Mahbubur Rahman, a secretary of the government of Bangladesh and Arifa Rahman, a former professor at the Institute of Modern Languages, University of Dhaka.

Mahbub stood 13th in the merit list of Secondary School Certificate and 5th in Higher Secondary Certificate examinations. He completed his bachelor's in electrical engineering from Bangladesh University of Engineering and Technology and master's from the University of Michigan, Ann Arbor. In 2004, he took a two-month course by Sandi C. Shore, daughter of Sammy Shore, at The Comedy Store in San Diego, California.

== Career ==
For 13 years, Mahbub served as an engineer at Ford Motor Company, Kyocera Wireless and Qualcomm in the United States and the CEO of IBM and Nokia Siemens Networks Bangladesh.

Mahbub had performed as a stand-up comic in the United States in the 2000s. He returned to Bangladesh in 2009. He founded the country's first comedy club, Naveed's Comedy Club in 2010.

Since June 2012, Mahbub hosted a late night television talk show "Grameenphone Presents – The Naveed Mahbub Show".

Mahbub claims to have acted in a small role in the film You Don't Mess with the Zohan, featuring Adam Sandler and Rob Schneider even though he isn't seen anywhere in the film.

Mahbub wrote a book, Humorously Yours and Counting (2015).

== Personal life ==
Mahbub married Zara Jabeen Chowhdhury, a corporate executive, in 1998. They have three children, Zaina, Maryam and Niyam.
