= Daulat Qazi =

17th-century poet of Bengal

- দৌলত কাজী
- Born: 1600; Sultanpur, Raozan Upazila, Chittagong, Bengal Subah (now Bangladesh)
- Died: 1638 (aged 37–38)
- Occupation: Poet
- Era: 17th century
- Known for: Early contributor to Bengali epic and romantic poetry

Daulat Qazi (Bengali: দৌলত কাজী; c. 1600–1638) was a Bengali poet. He was born into the Qazi family of the village of Sultanpur in Raozan Upazila, Chittagong. Not getting any recognition at home, he left for Arakan, where he seems to have been received warmly.

== Life and work ==
Qazi is believed to be the first Bengali poet to write under the patronage of the Arakan court. His patron Ashraf Khan was a commanding officer of King Thiri Thudhamma, who ruled from 1622 to 1638. There is evidence in his poem, that both Khan and Qazi were Sufis. Ashraf Khan asked Daulat to render the Avadhi narratives of Lor, Chandrani and Mayana into Bengali. Daulat Qazi died before he could finish his work. It was completed years later by Alaol.
