= Sukumar Barua =

Bangladeshi poet (1938–2026)

- সুকুমার বড়ুয়া
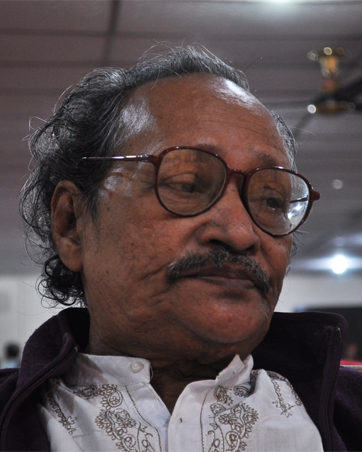
- Born: 5 January 1938; Raozan, Chittagong, Bengal Province, British India
- Died: 2 January 2026 (aged 87); Chittagong, Bangladesh
- Occupation: Poet
- Children: 4

Sukumar Barua (5 January 1938 – 2 January 2026) was a Bangladeshi poet. While working in various positions at the University of Dhaka, Barua wrote critically acclaimed children's rhymes and literature. His works were mostly humorous in nature, with some carrying a political edge. For his works, he was awarded the Ekushey Padak by the government of Bangladesh in 2017.

== Early life ==
Sukumar Barua was born on 5 January 1938 to Sarbananda and Kiran Bala Barua in the village of Madhyam Binajuri in Raozan. His father disappeared when Barua was young. Soon after at the age of 6, his family abandoned their home to avoid the conflicts of World War II. He was taught by his maternal uncle up until the first grade, where he shortly transferred to the Dabua School before leaving education all together. While his education stopped, Barua continued to read books.

== Career ==
Barua worked various jobs throughout his life, including work as a housekeeper. He had heard about career opportunities in Dhaka and moved there in 1960. He worked as a chef for two years before becoming a fourth-class employee of the Department of Biochemistry at the University of Dhaka. He would later transition to the Institute of Nutrition and Food Science as a third class employee. He retired from the university as a storekeeper in 1999.

Barua's literary career started in 1963 while renting his house in Dhaka. His first poem was published in the newspaper in 1968. Two years later, his first book Pagla Ghora (Note: পাগলা ঘোড়া in Bangla) was released. After these releases, Barua was encouraged by family and friends to quit his job to focus on his literature studies, but he refused as the pay from his job in Dhaka was too much to let go of. Barua would become best known for his children's poems, with his works "carv[ing] out a unique place in Bengali children's literature" and being featured in various magazines over his six decade-long career.

For his rhymes, Barua was awarded the Ekushey Padak for language and literature in 2017, the second-highest civilian honor in Bangladesh. He received other various awards throughout his career. Barua's works were marked by satire and humor, with some carrying political messages reflecting sentiments from the Bangladesh Liberation War.

== Personal life and death ==
Barua was married to Nalibala and had four children. He suffered from age-related health complications later in his life. A stroke in 2006 left his leg paralyzed. After suffering from a medical episode and being discharged from the hospital, he died on 2 January 2026, at the age of 87.

== Awards ==
- Janakantha Pratibha Sammanana (1998)
- Shabdapat Medal (2006)
- Kabir Chowdhury Shishu Sahitya Puraskar (2010)
- Odommo Chattagram Award (2012)
- Agrani Bank – Bangladesh Shishu Academy Shishu Sahitya Puraskar (2013)
- Ekushey Padak (2017)
