= Chittagong-7 =

Constituency of Bangladesh's Jatiya Sangsad

Coordinates: 22.47°N 92.05°E

- Constituency for the Jatiya Sangsad
- District: Chittagong District
- Division: Chittagong Division
- Electorate: 319,008 (2026)

Current constituency
- Created: 1973
- Party: Bangladesh Nationalist Party
- Member: Humam Quader Chowdhury
- ← 283 Chittagong-6 285 Chittagong-8 →

Chittagong-7 is a constituency represented in the Jatiya Sangsad (National Parliament) of Bangladesh since 2026 by Humam Quader Chowdhury of the Bangladesh Nationalist Party.

== Boundaries ==
The constituency encompasses Rangunia Upazila and one union parishad of Boalkhali Upazila: Sreepur Kharandwip.

== History ==
The constituency was created for the first general elections in newly independent Bangladesh, held in 1973.

Ahead of the 2008 general election, the Election Commission redrew constituency boundaries to reflect population changes revealed by the 2001 Bangladesh census. The 2008 redistricting altered the boundaries of the constituency.

Ahead of the 2014 general election, the Election Commission renumbered the seat for Sandwip Upazila from Chittagong-16 to Chittagong-3, bumping up by one the suffix of the former constituency of that name and the higher numbered constituencies in the district. Prior to that, Chittagong-7 had encompassed all but one union parishad (Sreepur Kharandwip) of Boalkhali Upazila, and Chittagong City Corporation wards 3 through 7.

== Members of Parliament ==
Election	Member	Party
1973	M. A. Manan	Awami League
1979	Salahuddin Quader Chowdhury	Bangladesh Muslim League
1986	Gias Uddin Quader Chowdhury	Jatiya Party
1988	Nazrul Islam	Jatiya Party
1991	Md. Yusuf	Communist Party of Bangladesh
Feb 1996	Nurul Alam	Independent
Jun 1996	Salahuddin Quader Chowdhury	Bangladesh Nationalist Party
2001	Salahuddin Quader Chowdhury	Bangladesh Nationalist Party
Major Boundary Changes
2008	Moin Uddin Khan Badal	Jatiya Samajtantrik Dal
Major Boundary Changes
2014	Muhammad Hasan Mahmud	Awami League
2018	Muhammad Hasan Mahmud	Awami League
2024	Muhammad Hasan Mahmud	Awami League
2026	Humam Quader Chowdhury	Bangladesh Nationalist Party

== Elections ==
=== Elections in the 2020s ===
General Election 2026: Chittagong-7
Party	Candidate	Votes	%	±%
BNP	Humam Quader Chowdhury	101,445	57.7	N/A
Jamaat	ATM Rezaul Karim	41,719	23.7	N/A
BIF	Iqbal Hasan	30,239	17.2	N/A
IAB	Abdullah Al Harun	1,307	0.7	N/A
CPB	Pramod Baran Barua	441	0.3	N/A
JP(E)	Md. Mehdi Rashed	411	0.2	N/A
AB Party	Md. Abdur Rahman	158	0.1	N/A
GOP	Md. Belal Uddin	129	0.1	N/A
Majority		59,726	20.1	N/A
Turnout		175,849	55.1	N/A
Registered electors		319,008		
BNP gain from AL				

=== Elections in the 2010s ===
General Election 2018: Chittagong-7
Party	Candidate	Votes	%	±%
AL	Muhammad Hasan Mahmud			
BNP	Md. Nurul Alam			
BIF	Md. Abu Nawshad			
Majority				
Turnout				
AL hold				

Muhammad Hasan Mahmud was elected unopposed in the 2014 general election after opposition parties withdrew their candidacies in a boycott of the election.

=== Elections in the 2000s ===
General Election 2008: Chittagong-7
Party	Candidate	Votes	%	±%
JSD	Moin Uddin Khan Badal	150,648	51.7	N/A
BNP	Ershad Ullah	133,466	45.8	−3.2
Independent	Mahabubul Alam	3,789	1.3	N/A
BIF	Abul Mansur	2,491	0.9	N/A
IAB	Md. Abdur Rahim Molla	655	0.2	N/A
Jatiya Party (M)	AAM Haider Ali Chowdhury	115	0.0	N/A
Independent	Md. Nurul Islam	103	0.0	N/A
Majority		17,182	5.9	−1.5
Turnout		291,267	77.4	+4.8
JSD gain from BNP				

General Election 2001: Chittagong-7
Party	Candidate	Votes	%	±%
BNP	Salahuddin Quader Chowdhury	65,116	49.0	+7.3
AL	Mohammad Sadek Chowdhury	55,267	41.6	+4.7
Independent	Md. Nurul Alam Talung	11,830	8.9	−6.0
CPB	Pramod Baran Barua	403	0.3	N/A
Independent	Kazi Md. Yusuf	201	0.2	N/A
Majority		9,849	7.4	+2.6
Turnout		132,817	72.6	+3.2
BNP hold				

=== Elections in the 1990s ===
General Election June 1996: Chittagong-7
Party	Candidate	Votes	%	±%
BNP	Salahuddin Quader Chowdhury	39,296	41.7	+17.3
AL	Mohammad Sadek Chowdhury	34,754	36.9	N/A
Independent	Md. Nurul Alam	14,086	14.9	N/A
Jamaat	Md. Amiruzzaman	3,709	3.9	N/A
BIF	Qazi Mohammad Musa Naymi	1,421	1.5	−0.1
JP(E)	Md. Nazrul Islam	893	0.9	N/A
Zaker Party	M. A. Haider Chowdhury	112	0.1	0.0
Majority		4,542	4.8	−3.3
Turnout		94,271	69.4	+15.4
AL gain from CPB				

General Election 1991: Chittagong-7
Party	Candidate	Votes	%	±%
CPB	Md. Yusuf	34,615	40.3	N/A
NDP	Giasuddin Quader Chowdhury	27,640	32.2	N/A
BNP	Md. Nurul Alam	20,991	24.4	N/A
BIF	Fazlul Kabir Chowdhury	1,385	1.6	N/A
Independent	Babu Sontos Bhuson Das	615	0.7	N/A
Independent	Sadekun Nur C	386	0.4	N/A
Zaker Party	M. A. Haider Chowdhury	106	0.1	N/A
NAP(B)	A. Kader Chowdhury	99	0.1	N/A
BML	Alamgir Chowdhury	86	0.1	N/A
Majority		6,975	8.1	N/A
Turnout		85,923	54.0	N/A
CPB gain from JP(E)				
