= Raozan Government College =

College in Bangladesh

- রাউজান সরকারি কলেজ
- Type: Public
- Established: 1963
- Founder: AKM Fazlul Kabir Chowdhury
- Principal: Salim Nawaz Chowdhury
- Students: 4000+
- Undergraduates: 2000+
- Location: Sultanpur, Raozan Upazila, Chittagong District, Bangladesh; 22.5342°N 91.9125°E
- Website: raozancollege.edu.bd

Raozan Government College, Chittagong (Bengali: রাউজান সরকারি কলেজ) is a government-run, honors-level degree college in Raozan Upazila, Chittagong District, Bangladesh. It was founded in 1963 by AKM Fazlul Kabir Chowdhury, a member of the East Pakistan Provincial Assembly.

In 2017, the Directorate of Secondary and Higher Education ordered that the college, which had been private, would be nationalized.

The campus is located on the south side of the Chittagong-Rangamati Highway in Sultanpur, Raozan Municipality, Chittagong. It is about 750 metres (2,460 ft) south of the Upazila headquarters. BDT 12.1 million (US$150,000) has been allocated for the construction of a four-story information technology building.
