= A K Khan & Company =

Bangladeshi conglomerate

A.K. Khan & Company Ltd.
- Type: Conglomerates
- Industry: Tire; Agro; Textile Mills; Forestry; Shipping; ICD logistics Stock and Securities; Telecom & IT; Hotel & Hospitality; ICT & logistics
- Founded: 1945; 81 years ago
- Founder: Abul Kashem Khan
- Headquarters: Ak Khan Mor, Chittagong, Bangladesh
- Area served: Worldwide
- Key people: A. M. Ziauddin Khan Chairman; Abul Kasem Khan Vice-Chairman; K A M Majedur Rahman Chief executive officer
- Total assets: 5.3 billion USD
- Number of employees: 7,000
- Website: www.akkhan.com

A K Khan & Co. Ltd. is a Bangladeshi conglomerate headquartered in Chittagong. It was established in 1945 by Abul Kashem Khan during the Second World War.

== History ==
A K Khan & Company established in 1945 by Abul Kashem Khan in Chittagong, which became the main port of East Pakistan after the Partition of India. Khan was the Minister of Industries in the government of Pakistan from 1958 to 1962. In the 1950s, Khan expanded into jute, insurance, textile, tannery, heavy industries, shipping, irrigation, and plywood.

After the death of Khan in 1991, A. M. Zahiruddin Khan took over the management of A K Khan & Company. In 1997, A K Khan and company launched AKTEL, a joint venture telecommunication service with Telekom Malaysia.

Zahiruddin died in 2005 and was succeeded by A. K. Shamsuddin Khan.

In June 2008, A K Khan & Company sold its 30 percent stake in AKTEL to NTT Docomo of Japan for US$350 million. The company announced the start of construction of a hotel in Chittagong in November 2009.

In November 2014, A K Khan and Company received permission to build an economic zone in Narsingdi District.

A. K. Shamsuddin Khan retired as chairman of A K Khan & Company retired in 2015 and was replaced by Zebun Nahar Islam.

A K Khan & Company announced it will establish a tire plant under joint collaboration with Indian company CEAT in January 2016. The company is also building a private sector Special Economic Zone in Narsingdi.

In October 2020, KAM Majedur was appointed chief executive officer of A K Khan & Company.

A. M. Ziauddin Khan succeeded Zebun Nahar Islam as chairman of the group in 2023. A K Khan Economic Zone in 2023 was awaiting a gas connection from Titas Gas to begin operation.

== Board of directors ==
| Name | Position | Reference |
|---|---|---|
| A. M. Ziauddin Khan | Chairman | |
| Abul Kasem Khan | Vice-Chairman | |
| K A M Majedur Rahman | Chief executive officer | |
| A. K. Shamsuddin Khan | Director | |
| Yasmine Khan Kabir | Director | |
| Sadruddin Khan | Director | |
| Mikhail Idris Islam | Director | |
| Mujtaba Ali Khan | Director | |

== Subsidiaries ==
- A K Khan WaterHealth (Bangladesh) Limited
- CEAT A K Khan Limited
- AK Khan Penfabric Company Limited
- M.Y. & Union (BD) Limited
- Coats Bangladesh Limited (joint venture with Coats Group)
- Bengal Fisheries Limited
- Akceycom Limited
- Andhar Manik Tea State
- A. K. Khan Jute Mill
- Chittagong Textile Mills Limited
- A.K. Khan Match Factory
- A.K. Khan Rubber Plantation
- A. K. Khan Plywood Factory
- A. K. Khan & Company Limited Clearance and Forwarding Division
- A. K. Khan Cold Storage Limited
- A. K. Khan Securities Limited
- A. K. Khan Telecom Limited
- Infocom Limited
- A K Khan Economic Zone
- A.K. Khan Container Terminal
- AKK Logistics & Distribution Limited
- Niketan Hotel and Resort, Chittagong
- AKK Real Estate Limited
- A.K. Khan Tower
