= Mujibul Huq =

Bangladeshi civil servant (1930–2014)

- মুজিবুল হক

6th Cabinet Secretary of Bangladesh
- In office 24 November 1986 – 1989
- Preceded by: Mohammad Mahbubuzzaman
- Succeeded by: M. K. Anwar

Chairman of the National Pay Commission

Personal details
- Born: 31 December 1930 Gabha, Barisal District, East Bengal, British India
- Died: 12 January 2014 (aged 83) Dhaka, Bangladesh
- Education: University of Dhaka
- Occupation: Civil servant, academic
- Awards: Independence Day Award (2005); Atishdipankar Gold Medal (1993)

Mujibul Huq was a Bangladesh civil servant and recipient of the Independence Day Award of Bangladesh.

== Early life and education ==
Huq was born on 31 December 1930 to a Bengali family of Muslim Sheikhs from the village of Gabha, which lies on the border of Banaripara and Jhalokati Sadar. The Sheikhs of Gabha were descendants of Sheikh Ibrahim, a convert who belonged to the Hindu Dewan-Majumdar family of Barukathi and was awarded land in Gabha by the Mughals.

Huq studied in Dhaka University and was involved in the Language Movement of 1952. He taught in University of Dhaka for a while.

== Career ==
Huq joined the Pakistan civil service in 1954. After the independence of Bangladesh in 1971, he served as the secretary in a number of ministries including the defense ministry. He was the chairman of the National Pay Commission. He retired in 1988 as the cabinet secretary and in 1993, he was awarded the Atishdipankar Gold Medal. In 2005, he was awarded the Independence Day Award. He was a member of the Nagorik Committee in 2006.

== Personal life ==
Huq's daughter is married to Bangladesh Nationalist Party politician Gias Uddin Quader Chowdhury, son of A.K.M. Fazlul Quader Chowdhury and brother of Salauddin Quader Chowdhury.

== Death ==
Huq died on 12 January 2014.
