= Transnational University Limburg =

Belgian and Dutch educational institution

transnationale Universiteit Limburg
- Other names: tUL
- Established: November 28, 2000; 25 years ago
- Founders: Universiteit Maastricht; Limburgs Universitair Centrum
- Location: Belgium; The Netherlands
- Website: tul.edu

The transnationale Universiteit Limburg (abbreviation tUL and translation in English is: 'transnational University Limburg') is based in Belgium and the Netherlands. The tUL was founded together by both the Universiteit Maastricht and the Limburgs Universitair Centrum, now Hasselt University as a way to co-operate better.

== Organisational structure ==
The tUL has a quite complicated organisational structure. Even though it has been created out of two already existing universities, it legally is not dependent on any of them. Both in Belgium and the Netherlands the tUL is a single university, separate from both founding universities.

The tUL, even though being totally separate from the LUC and the UM, is not housed on its own campus. The campus is split up along two locations, Diepenbeek in Belgium and Maastricht in the Netherlands. It currently consists out of two schools, the School of Life Sciences and the School of Information Technology.

== History ==
The tUL, even though only officially founded in 2000, has a longer history. Starting as early as 1988 the two parent universities have been opening discussions to co-operate better. In 1992 both universities offered the study Computer Science/Knowledge Engineering. The course was given in both universities and students had to attend classes on both campuses. In 1998 a mixed Dutch/Belgian committee proposed the idea of an official transnational university, which got accepted by the Flemish government in 1999. In 2001 the treaty was signed by the Dutch and Belgian minister of education officially instating the tUL as the first Belgian-Dutch transnational university. The studies Computer Science/Knowledge Engineering and Biomedical Sciences were the first offered by the university. In 2002 the university started offering Molecular Life Sciences as a third option. The official number of students starting college in 2001 was at 526, 220 for Biomedical Sciences and 306 for Computer Science/Knowledge Engineering. The university is an example of international collaboration in education.

== Current developments ==
Even though the number of students studying Computer Science/Knowledge Engineering before the official instantiation of the tUL had been rising every year, the launch of this new university brought along some problems, decreasing the student count. The tUL was not allowed to advertise itself in Dutch study guides because it was not an official Dutch University. Also, there were issues concerning national differences (amongst others on the legal/financial division of responsibilities), and also on the Dutch side the tUL was considered a prestige/vanity project of former Maastricht University board chairman Karl Dittrich.
