= Abul Kashem Khan =

Bangladeshi politician (1905–1991)

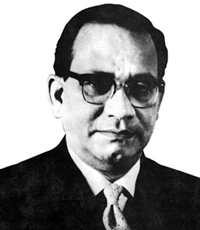
- Khan at his residence (1960)

Member of the National Assembly
- In office 1958–1962
- Succeeded by: A. K. M. Fazlul Quader Chowdhury
- Constituency: NE-72 (Chittagong-II)

Personal details
- Born: 5 April 1905 Panchlaish, Eastern Bengal and Assam, British India
- Died: 31 March 1991 (aged 85) Dhaka, Bangladesh
- Party: Convention Muslim League (till 1965)
- Other political affiliations: All India Muslim League (till 1948)
- Spouse: Shamsun Nahar Khan (m. 1935)
- Children: 9, including A. M. Zahiruddin Khan
- Relatives: M.R Siddiqi (son-in-law); Justice KM Hasan (son-in-law); Colonel Farooq (nephew-in-law); Khandaker Abdur Rashid (nephew-in-law)
- Education: Presidency University
- Occupation: Industrialist
- Known for: Founder of A K Khan & Company

Abul Kashem Khan (best known as A. K. Khan; 5 April 1905 – 31 March 1991) was a Bangladeshi lawyer, industrialist, and politician. In 1945, he founded A K Khan & Company, one of Pakistan's and later Bangladesh's leading conglomerates. Khan served as a member of the Constituent Assembly of India and the Constituent Assembly of Pakistan. He was a federal minister of Pakistan and s member of the Pakistan National Assembly.

== Early life ==
Abul Kashem Khan was born in a family historically active in the politics of Bengal in the village of Mohara in Panchlaish in Chittagong in 1905. His father, Abdul Latif Khan, was a government sub-registrar at Fatehabad, Chittagong, and his mother's name was Wahabun Nessa Khan. Khan's great-great-great-grandfather, Shamsher Khan, was a rich politician and minister in the city of Gour in the 16th century. Khan studied law at Presidency College, Calcutta. In 1934 he joined the Kolkata High Court as an advocate. He joined the judicial branch of the Bengali Civil Service in 1935. He continued in the service till 1944.

== Career ==
Khan entered business during the Second World War in 1945, when Chittagong was a key base for Allied Forces. A variety of industries, including a match factory, a plywood factory, a garment mill, and a dockyard, have been stepped up by him. He was elected a member of the Constituent Assembly of India from the All-India Muslim League candidate in 1946. He joined the Pakistan Constituent Assembly after the partition of India. In the 1951-1952 budget, he spoke against the economic discrimination toward East Pakistan.

Sir, I cannot help' remark ' which I hope will not be misinterpreted as an indication of petty provincial-mindedness. Sir, these are the days of decentralisation and regional self-sufficiency. We find that in this six-year plan, the total sum allocated to East Bengal where 56 percent of your people live is less than 23 percent. Under the head 'Agriculture', provision has been made for 82 crores and a sum total of all the projects envisaged for East Bengal is only 5.6 crores. Under the head 'Development of Hydro-Electric Power', a provision for 45 crores has been made and the share of East Bengal is only 5 crores. Under the head 'Industries', provision has been made for textile industries' [for West Pakistan] to the tune of 30 crores and the provision for jute industry' [for East Bengal] is only 11 crores. Now, Sir, this gives a clear indication that not only in the past, not only in the present, but in the future development plans of the country, East Bengal is not expected to get its legitimate share.

== Politics ==
Khan was the minister of Industries, Works, Irrigation, Power and Mineral Resources from 1958 to 1962. From 1962 to 1964, he was a member of the national assembly of Pakistan. He retired from politics in 1965.

== Personal life ==
Khan married Shamsun Nahar Khan in 1935. She was the daughter of a wealthy merchant, Abdul Bari Chowdhury, who owned industries in British Burma. Abdul Bari owned a shipping company and multiple rice mills in Rangoon until the Japanese invasion of Burma, after which he moved to Chittagong. In Chittagong, he established a shipping company called the Bengal-Burma Steam Navigation Company, the first maritime company in the area to challenge the dominance of the British India Steam Navigation Company. Chowdhury also served as a director of the Pakistan Industrial Credit and Investment Corporation.

Khan had nine children with Shamsun Nahar, five sons and four daughters: Zahiruddin (Bambu), Shamsuddin (Jambu), Salahuddin, Sadruddin, Ziauddin (Pablo), Latifa (Kohinoor), Zebun Nahar, Yasmin, and Shamima.

Khan's eldest son, Zahiruddin, was married to Asma Afzal, daughter of Barrister Khandkar Ali Afzal, the first Bengali secretary of the Bengal Legislative Assembly and granddaughter of Khandakar Fazle Rabbi, Dewan for the Nawab of Murshidabad.

Khan's eldest daughter, Latifa, was married to Bangladesh's first minister of commerce and the first Bangladeshi ambassador to the United States, Mustafizur Rahman Siddiqi.

== Death ==
Khan died on 31 March 1991. His wife, Shamsun Nahar Khan, died two months later.

== In popular culture ==
AK Khan More is a circle located in Chittagong, Bangladesh, near the Dhaka-Chittagong Trunk Road.
