= A.B.M. Fazle Karim Chowdhury =

Bangladeshi politician

- এ.বি.এম ফজলে করিম চৌধুরী
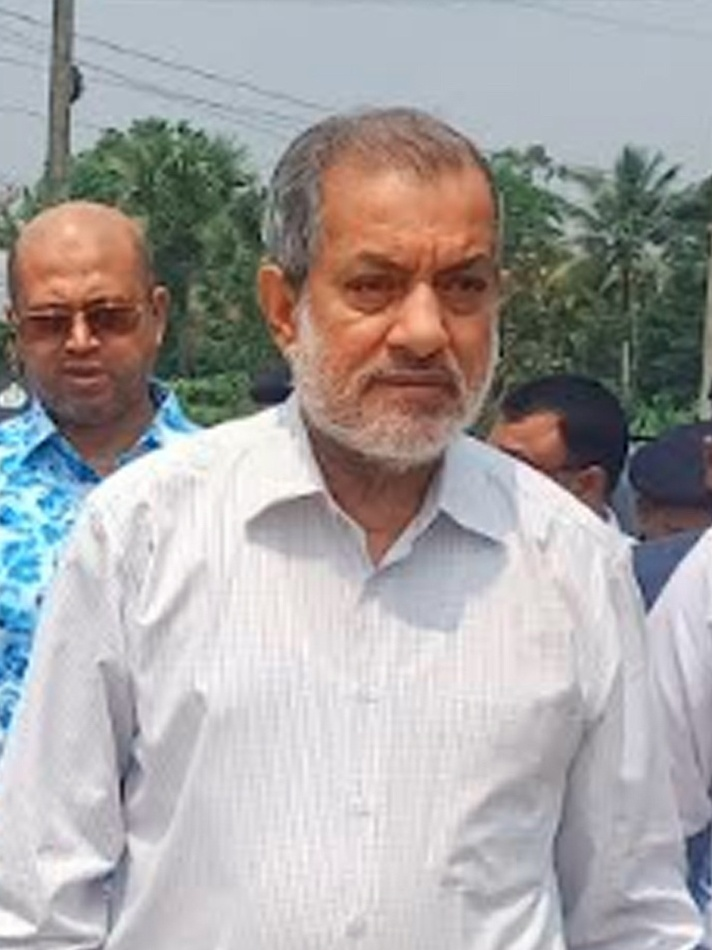
- Chowdhury in March 2024

Member of Parliament
- In office 1 October 2001 – 6 August 2024
- Preceded by: Giasuddin Quader Chowdhury
- Succeeded by: Giasuddin Quader Chowdhury
- Constituency: Chittagong-6

Personal details
- Born: 6 November 1954 (age 71) Chittagong, East Pakistan, Pakistan
- Party: Bangladesh Awami League
- Spouse: Rizwana Yusuf
- Parent: A.K.M. Fazlul Kabir Chowdhury (father)
- Relatives: The Chowdhury family of Chittagong
- Education: University of Chittagong

A.B.M. Fazle Karim Chowdhury is a Bangladesh Awami League politician and a former Jatiya Sangsad member representing the Chittagong-6 constituency. He was elected to five consecutive terms. He was the chairman of the Parliamentary Standing Committee of the Railways Ministry. His father, A.K.M. Fazlul Kabir Chowdhury, served as a member of parliament as well as leader of the opposition in the East Pakistan Provincial Assembly.

== Early life ==
Chowdhury was born on 6 November 1954. He has a B.A. and an M.A. degree in history from the University of Chittagong. His father was AKM Fazlul Kabir Chowdhury, and his uncle was Fazlul Quader Chowdhury. His cousins and Bangladesh Nationalist Party politicians, Salauddin Quader Chowdhury and Giasuddin Quader Chowdhury, were major political opponents of Chowdhury in Chittagong.

== Career ==
Chowdhury was elected to parliament in 2001 from Chittagong-6 as an Awami League candidate with 52 percent of the vote. He faced two murder charges; he received acquittal in one and a discharge in another.

Chowdhury was re-elected to parliament from Chittagong-5 as a candidate of Awami League with 49 percent of the votes. Chowdhury served as the chairman of the Parliamentary Standing Committee on the Ministry of Housing and Public Works. He was a member of the Parliamentary Standing Committee on the Chittagong Hill Tracts Affairs Ministry.

Chowdhury was elected to parliament from Chittagong-6 in 2014 and served as chairman of the Parliamentary Standing Committee on the Ministry of Railway until 5 August 2024. In this period he developed CRB areas, reconstructed some of the old buildings, and made a gallery for pedestrians and visitors. According to his wealth statement, he made significant profit from fish farming at around 25 million taka.

In January 2015, Chowdhury was elected to the Human Rights Committee of the Inter-Parliamentary Union.

Chowdhury was re-elected to parliament in 2018 as a candidate of the Awami League with 230,471 votes while his nearest rival, Jashim Uddin Shikder of the Bangladesh Nationalist Party, received 2,244 votes.

Chowdhury tested positive for COVID-19 in August 2020 during the COVID-19 pandemic in Bangladesh.

On 24 August 2021, Chowdhury chaired a meeting of the Parliamentary Standing Committee on the Railway Ministry.

On 11 September 2024, Chowdhury was arrested near the Akhaura border in Brahmanbaria by Border Guard Bangladesh while entering India. He was later charged with murder cases during the student movement in 2024.

== International legal representation and human-rights concerns ==
A.B.M. Fazle Karim Chowdhury was arrested on September 12, 2024, by Border Guard Bangladesh at the Akhaura border, initially facing criminal charges after the Awami League govt fall down.

Following his arrest and legal proceedings, the case of A.B.M. Fazle Karim Chowdhury drew extensive attention, appeals, and formal interventions from international human rights organizations, global parliamentary bodies, diplomats, and legal experts.

=== Inter-Parliamentary Union (IPU) ===
- At its 217th session in April 2026, the IPU Governing Council adopted a consensus decision (Case BGD-17) regarding A.B.M. Fazle Karim Chowdhury.
- The IPU expressed deep concern over his harsh detention conditions, security threats, and the severe deterioration of his health without access to specialized medical care.
- The council urged national authorities to ensure his rights and consider releasing him on humanitarian bail on a case-by-case basis.
- His son, Faraaz Karim Chowdhury, provided testimony and documentation during a hearing with the IPU committee.

=== Parliamentarians for Global Action (PGA) ===
- The PGA's Parliamentary Rapid Response Team called for the release of Chowdhury and other detained former MPs, citing arbitrary detention and violations of due process under the ICCPR.
- The organization stated that the criminal charges against him appeared politically motivated and unsubstantiated.
- It highlighted that he faced harsh prison conditions, denial of medical treatment for heart disease, diabetes, and kidney issues, and hostile crowds during court appearances.

=== Human Rights Organizations ===
- Human Rights Watch (HRW) highlighted serious fair-trial concerns at Bangladesh's International Crimes Tribunal (ICT), noting issues such as duplicated witness statements and prosecutorial misconduct allegations.
- Amnesty International confirmed it was monitoring his case and raised it directly during high-level meetings with Bangladesh's Law Minister.

=== Global Parliamentary and Diplomatic Interventions ===
- United Kingdom: UK MPs Bob Blackman and Jim Shannon wrote to Foreign Secretary Ed Miliband concerning the case, with Blackman addressing the matter during public remarks in London in September 2026. MP Alex Sobel submitted parliamentary questions regarding ICT prosecutorial bribery allegations and independent monitoring, and Lord Alton of Liverpool drew urgent updates to the attention of FCDO Ministers. UK senior lawyer Lord Carlile KC criticized the legal proceedings, stating they lacked credibility and that evidence had not been served.
- Australia: Federal parliamentarians engaged with the case, including Jamie Chaffey MP who made a parliamentary speech, raised concerns with the foreign minister, and submitted formal representations. Correspondence was also processed through the Joint Standing Committee secretariat and Senator Dean Smith's office.
- Argentina: Former Argentine Senate President and G20 Sherpa Federico Pinedo—a former colleague on the IPU Human Rights of Parliamentarians Committee—sent a personal letter to the Bangladesh Law Minister requesting a review of his health conditions and domicile internship.
- Philippines: Former Philippine Representative Leila M. de Lima issued a statement of solidarity, expressing deep concern over his detention conditions, inadequate medical care, and reported fair-trial violations.
- European Union and Switzerland: The European Parliament's Subcommittee on Human Rights (DROI) stated that the EU Delegation in Dhaka actively monitors ICT proceedings for fair-trial guarantees and individual accountability. Diplomatic touchpoints and humanitarian appeals were also acknowledged by the Embassy of Switzerland in Dhaka.
