= Md. Yousuf =

Bangladeshi politician (died 2018)

Muhammad Yousuf
- মুহাম্মদ ইঊসুফ

Member of Parliament for Chittagong-7
- In office 5 March 1991 – 24 November 1995
- Preceded by: Md. Nazrul Islam
- Succeeded by: Salahuddin Quader Chowdhury

Personal details
- Born: 1 January 1949 Rangunia, Chittagong District, East Bengal
- Died: 17 February 2018 (aged 69) Dhaka, Bangladesh
- Party: Bangladesh Awami League
- Other political affiliations: Communist Party of Bangladesh

Muhammad Yousuf (Bengali: মুহাম্মদ ইঊসুফ; died 17 February 2018) was a Bangladeshi politician.

== Early life ==
Yousuf was born on 1 January 1949 to a Bengali family of Muslims in the East Syed Bari of Rangunia, Chittagong District, East Bengal. He studied at the Rangunia College. Yousuf remained a bachelor.

== Career ==
Yousuf was a Bangladesh Awami League politician. He served as a Jatiya Sangsad member from the Chittagong-7 constituency representing the Communist Party of Bangladesh. He later joined the Awami League.
