= Mahbub Ul Alam Choudhury =

- মাহবুব-উল-আলম চৌধুরী
- Born: 7 November 1927; Chittagong, Bengal Presidency, British India
- Died: 23 December 2007 (aged 80); Dhaka, Bangladesh
- Spouse: Jowshan Ara Rahman (m. 1952)

Mahbub Ul Alam Choudhury (7 November 1927 – 23 December 2007) was a Bangladeshi poet, journalist, and activist in the Bengali language movement. He wrote the first poem on the Bengali Language Movement. He was awarded the Ekushey Padak in 2009 by the government of Bangladesh.

== Early life ==
Choudhury was born on 7 November 1927 in Gohira, Raozan Upazila, Chittagong District, East Bengal, British India, to Ahmadur Rahman Chowdhury and Rowshan Ara Begum. He passed the Entrance Examination with distinction from Gohira High School in 1947. He could not finish his studies at Chittagong College due to political reasons. He was a member of the Students Federation, an organisation for Muslim students.

== Career ==
Choudhury got involved in politics very early in his life. In 1942 he joined the Quit India movement against the British regime. In 1945, he participated in the Bengal Provincial Students Summit, where he came upon with the famous Bengali literature writers of that time. He went across the rural areas during the political turmoil in 1946. He also became the secretary of the first ever Nazrul anniversary in Chittagong. After the formation of Pakistan in 1947, Choudhury formed a monthly magazine Shimanto. He protested against the killing of protesting farmers at Halda River by the Pakistan government. He attended the World Peace Conference in Kolkata at the Deshbandhu Park. Shimanto was in publication till 1952.

Choudhury was involved in the language movement from 1948 to 1956. He organized protests in 1950 against the government of Pakistan for not making Bengali a national language. He joined the a youth conference in 1951 that led to the establishment of the East Pakistan Jubo League. In 1952 he was in the Chittagong State Language Action Committee. On February 21, after knowing the police incident at Dhaka University, he immediately wrote the poem Kadte Asini, Phansir Dabi Niye Esechhi which is the first poem of the movement. The poem was banned by the government of Pakistan. He was a central committee member and secretary of the Chittagong District unit of the Ganotontri Dal, a secular party established in 1953.

Chowdhury was the founding secretary of the "Bishwa Shanti Porishad" (World Peace Council) and "Shanti Fauj" (Peace Corp) to take a stand against communal riots in Chittagong. He campaigned for the United Front in 1954. He retired from politics in 1965. He participated in the Kagmari Conference in 1957. He established Gohira Degree College in 1968.

After the independence of Bangladesh in 1971, Chowdhury was appointed chairman of the editorial board of Daily Swadhinata, published from Chittagong from 1972 to 1982. He founded Kristi Kendra and Sahittya Baithak, monthly magazine, in Chittagong. He moved to Dhaka in 1975.

== Personal life ==
Chowdhury married Jowshan Ara Rahman (1936–2024) on 10 October 1952. She worked as the chief of the Women's Development Programme in UNICEF Bangladesh from 1979 until 1996.

=== Death and legacy ===
Chowdhury died on 23 December 2007 in United Hospital, Dhaka. He was posthumously awarded the Ekushey Padak in 2009.
