= National Democratic Party (Bangladesh) =

Political party in Bangladesh

National Democratic Party ন্যাশনাল ডেমোক্রেটিক পার্টি
- Abbreviation: NDP / এনডিপি
- President: Kari Mohammad Abu Taher
- Chairman: Kari Mohammad Abu Taher
- General Secretary: Mojibur Rahman
- Founder: Salahuddin Quader Chowdhury; Anowar Zahid
- Founded: 11 September 1989; 37 years ago
- Preceded by: Bangladesh Nationalist Party
- Headquarters: Dhaka
- Ideology: Bangladeshi nationalism
- Political position: Right-wing
- National affiliation: 20 Party Alliance
- Slogan: Bangladesh Zindabad ("Long Live Bangladesh")

Party flag
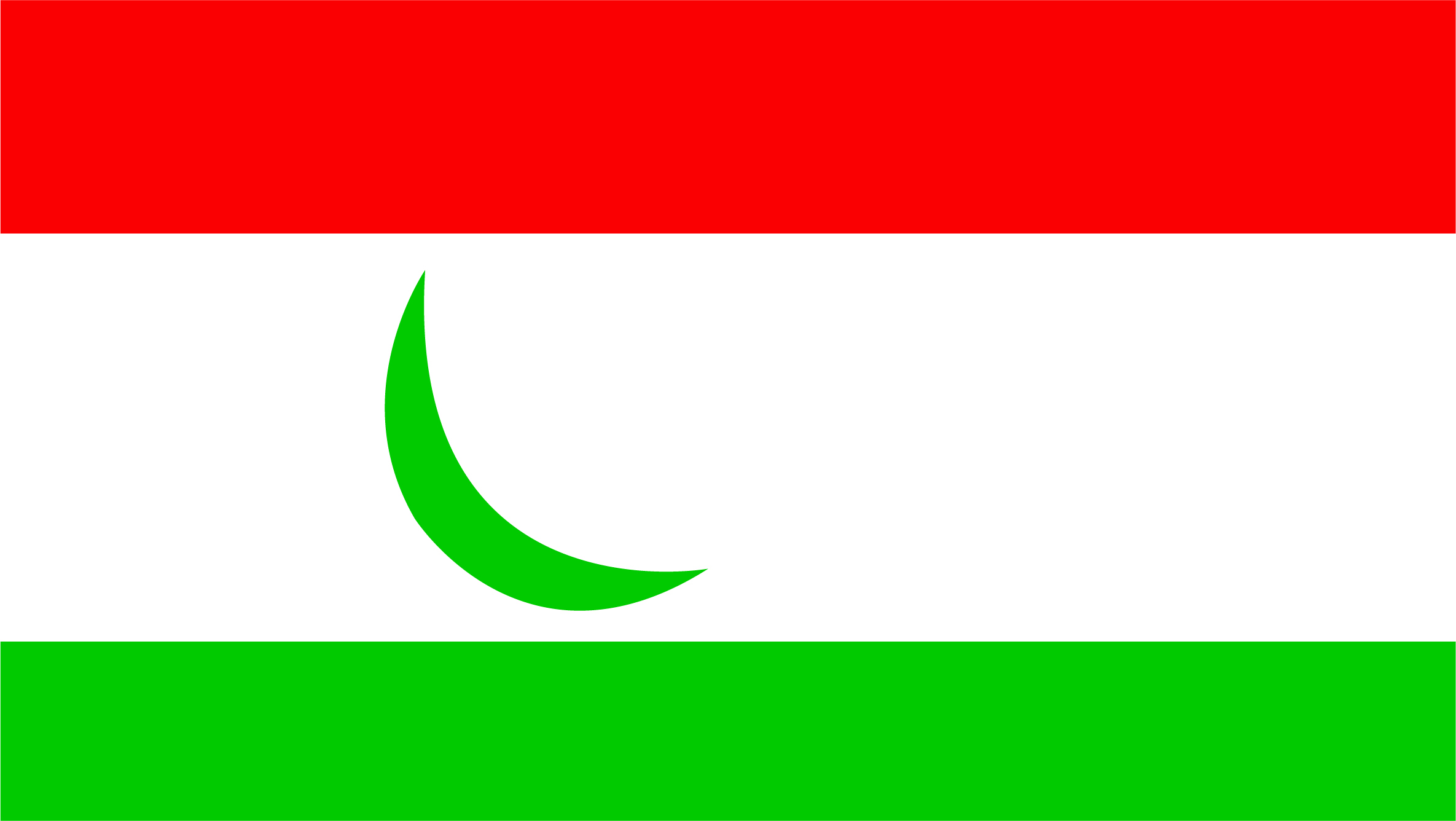

Website
- www.ndpbd.com

The National Democratic Party is a right-wing political party in Bangladesh founded by Salahuddin Quader Chowdhury and Anowar Zahid in 1989. Kari Mohammad Abu Taher is the present chairman of the party from 17 October 2017.

== History ==
Salahuddin Quader Chowdhury led the National Democratic Party in the early 1990s and worked against the Awami League and against the Bangladesh Nationalist Party (BNP) governments. Chowdhury was elected to Parliament from Chittagong-6 constituency in the 1991 general election.

The NDP joined the National Democratic Front, an alliance of 10 nationalist parties, in September 2014. The party had left the BNP-led Grand Alliance in October 2014. It again left the BNP in 2022 and created the 12 Party Alliance.

== Leadership ==
On the NDP's website, the party's president and chairman is listed as Kari Mohammad Abu Taher, and its general secretary as Mojibur Rahman. However, the NDP's national executive committee reportedly expelled Abu Taher unanimously on 29 June 2025, replacing him with secretary general Abdullah Al Harun (Sohel).
