= A. K. M. Fazlul Quader Chowdhury =

Pakistani politician (1919–1973)

A.K.M. Fazlul Quader Chowdhury
- এ.কে.এম. ফজলুল কাদের চৌধুরী
- A.K.M. Fazlul Quader Chowdhury

3rd Speaker of the National Assembly of Pakistan
- In office 29 November 1963 – 12 June 1965
- Leader: Ayub Khan
- Preceded by: Maulvi Tamizuddin Khan
- Succeeded by: Abdul Jabbar Khan

President of Pakistan
- In office 2 March 1965 – 10 March 1965 as Acting President
- Preceded by: Ayub Khan
- Succeeded by: Ayub khan

President of Convention Muslim League
- In office 25 March 1969 – 16 December 1971
- Preceded by: Ayub Khan
- Succeeded by: Malik Muhammad Qasim

Personal details
- Born: 26 March 1919 Raozan, Bengal, British India
- Died: 17 July 1973 (aged 54) Dacca Central Jail, Dhaka, Bangladesh
- Party: Muslim League (before 1962); Convention Muslim League (1962–1969)
- Spouse: Syeda Selima Quader Chowdhury
- Relations: A.K.M. Fazlul Kabir Chowdhury (brother); Salman F Rahman (nephew); Mohammad Abdul Haque (brother-in-law)
- Children: Salahuddin; Saifuddin; Giasuddin
- Relatives: Chowdhuries of Chittagong
- Education: Calcutta University Law College

A.K.M. Fazlul Quader Chowdhury (Bengali: এ.কে.এম. ফজলুল কাদের চৌধুরী; 1919–1973) was a Bengali politician who served as the 5th speaker of the National Assembly of Pakistan from East Pakistan. He belonged to Ayub Khan's Convention Muslim League. He was also the acting president of Pakistan from time to time when Ayub Khan left the country. His elder brother, Fazlul Kabir Chowdhury, was the leader of the opposition in the East Pakistan assembly. Quader was preceded by Maulvi Tamizuddin Khan of the Awami League.

== Early life ==
Chowdhury was born on 26 March 1919 to a Bengali Muslim zamindar family in Gahira, Raozan, located in the Chittagong District of the Bengal Province. His father, Khan Bahadur Abdul Jabbar Chaudhry, was a police official in the British Raj, and his mother, Begum Fatema Khatun Chaudhurani, was a housewife.

== Education ==
Chaudhry graduated from Calcutta Presidency College and earned a B.L degree from Calcutta University Law College. In 1941 he was elected general secretary of the All-India Muslim Student Federation. In 1942 he was arrested due to the Indian Security Act of 1942. He joined the All-India Muslim League and was elected the secretary of the Chittagong district unit of the party in 1943.

== Career ==
In 1947, Fazlul Quadir Chowdhury supported the United Bengal pact of Sarat Bose and Huseyn Shaheed Suhrawardy, but when Suhrawardy agreed to form Pakistan, he failed from presenting the matter to Muhammad Ali Jinnah.

Chaudhury was elected member of the Pakistan National Assembly in 1962. In Ayub Khan's cabinet he served in the Ministry of Agriculture and Works, the Ministry of Education and Information and the Ministry of Labour and Social Welfare. He played an important role in floating the Convention Muslim League (1962) and was elected a member of the central committee of the party.

He facilitated the foundation of University of Chittagong, Chittagong University of Engineering & Technology, Chittagong Medical College, Chittagong Marine Academy, Chittagong Marine Fisheries and the Polytechnic Institute.

== Personal life ==
=== Family ===
FQC's father, Abdul Jabbar Chaudhry, was a 12th-generation descendant of Sheikh Mohammed Baradam Laskar, whose forefathers were from the ancient city of Gour (present-day in Malda, West Bengal). His mother, Fatema Khatun Chaudhurani, was the daughter of Siddique Ahmed Chowdhury (son of 18th-century poet Rahimunnessa).

Chaudhry married Syeda Selima Begum, the second daughter of Syed Azizullah of the Syed family of South Charta (Comilla District) and Syeda Ammatul Ela Raziya Khatun. They had six children. Their eldest son, Salahuddin Quader Chowdhury, was a six-time Bangladeshi parliamentarian and adviser to Khaleda Zia. Their second son, Saifuddin Qadir Chaudhry, was a businessman and their third son, Giasuddin Quader Chowdhury, was also a parliamentarian. Their fourth son, Jamaluddin Qadir Chaudhry, is an industrialist. Their two daughters are Zobaida Quader Chaudhry and Hasina Quader Sinha.

=== Extended family ===
The family of Fazlul Qadir Chaudhry (FQC) is one of the most prominent and interconnected Muslim families of Bengal. Kafi Kamal, a senior reporter with the Manab Zamin, details the extent of FQC's relations in his book Attiyotar Bondhone Rajneeti (Kinship Politics).

FQC's eldest son, Salahuddin, was married to Farhat Quader Chowdhury. Farhat is the daughter of Alamgir Mohammad Adel (brother of Jahangir Mohammad Adel) and Laili Chowdhury (daughter of Lal Mia and niece of Mohan Mia, zamindars of Faridpur). Salahuddin and Farhat's son, Hummam, is married to the granddaughter of industrialist A. K. Khan. FQC's second son, Saifuddin, is married to the paternal granddaughter of Muslim League leader Abul Hashim. Marxist–Leninist theorist Badruddin Umar is Saifuddin's uncle-in-law. FQC's third son, Giasuddin, is married to the daughter of former Cabinet Secretary of Bangladesh and language movement activist Mujibul Huq. FQC's daughter, Hasina, is married to the younger brother of former BNP minister Mizanur Rahman Sinha.

His brother, AKM Fazlul Kabir Chowdhury, was the leader of the opposition in the East Pakistan Legislative Assembly. His son, Advocate ABM Fazle Rashid Chowdhury, was married to former member of parliament and Jatiya Party presidium member Professor Masuda M Rashid Chowdhury. His other son, A.B.M. Fazle Karim Chowdhury, is an Awami League politician and the current member of parliament for Raozan upazila.

FQC's sister was married to industrialist Hedayat Hossain Chowdhury, founder of Karnaphuli Group and HRC Group. His son, Saber Hossain Chowdhury, is an Awami League politician and the current member of parliament for Dhaka-9.

FQC's second cousin was Awami League politician A. B. M. Mohiuddin Chowdhury, a former mayor of Chittagong. Mohiuddin's paternal grandfather, Munawer Ali Chowdhury, was the elder brother of FQC's paternal grandfather, Iqbal Ali Chowdhury (both sons of Bakshe Elahi Chowdhury).

His wife's elder sister, Syeda Roqeya Akhtar, was married to former finance minister Murtaza Raza Choudhry, zamindar of Monakosha. Their son, Mainur Reza Chowdhury, was the 12th Chief Justice of Bangladesh. FQC's other sister-in-law was Syeda Fatina Rahman, wife of Muslim League leader Fazlur Rahman. Their son, Salman F Rahman, is the vice-chairman of Beximco Group and an advisor to Prime Minister Sheikh Hasina.

== Arrest and death ==
In 1973, after the independence of Bangladesh (former East Pakistan), he was jailed in Bangladesh for war crimes as a collaborator of the Pakistan Army in 1971. He died in Dhaka Central Jail on 17 July 1973.

== Legacy ==
Chaudhury's elder son, Salahuddin Quader Chowdhury, was a politician. He was elected a member of the Bangladeshi Parliament six times. In October 2015, the Supreme Court of Bangladesh upheld the death sentence awarded by the international crime tribunal for the alleged crime committed by Salahuddin Quader Chowdhury during the Liberation War of Bangladesh in 1971. The death sentence was executed in the early hours of 22 November 2015 inside Dhaka Central Jail.

Political offices
Preceded by Maulvi Tamizuddin Khan	Speaker of the National Assembly; 1963–1965	Succeeded by Abdul Jabbar Khan
