= Kotalpokhar =

Kotalpokhar Kotalpukur
- Village
- Location in Jharkhand, India Kotalpokhar (India)
- Coordinates: 24.746778°N 87.826167°E
- Country: India
- State: Jharkhand
- District: Sahibganj

Population (2011)
  - Total: 2,818

Languages (*For language details see Barharwa (community development block)#Language and religion)
  - Official: Hindi, Urdu
- Time zone: UTC+5:30 (IST)
- PIN: 816107
- Telephone/ STD code: 06426
- Lok Sabha constituency: Rajmahal
- Vidhan Sabha constituency: Pakaur
- Website: sahibganj.nic.in

Kotalpokhar (also written as Kotalpukur, Kotal Pukur) is a village in the Barharwa CD block in the Rajmahal subdivision of the Sahibganj district in the Indian state of Jharkhand.

== Geography ==
Cities, towns and locations in the Sahibganj, Godda and Pakur districts in Santhal Pargana Division
M: municipality, CT: census town, R: rural/ urban centre, H: historical/ religious/ tourist centre
Owing to space constraints in the small map, the actual locations in a larger map may vary slightly

=== Location ===
Kotalpukur is located at 24.746778°N 87.826167°E.

Kotal Pukur has an area of 152.46 hectares (376.7 acres).

=== Overview ===
The map shows a hilly area with the Rajmahal hills running from the bank of the Ganges in the extreme north to the south, beyond the area covered by the map into Dumka district. ‘Farakka’ is marked on the map and that is where Farakka Barrage is, just inside West Bengal. Rajmahal coalfield is shown in the map. The entire area is overwhelmingly rural with only small pockets of urbanisation.

Note: All places marked on the map are linked and you can easily move on to another page of your choice. Enlarging the map lets you see what else is there – one can find railway links, many more road links and so on.

== Demographics ==
According to the 2011 Census of India, Kotal Pukur a total population of 2,818, of which 1,452 (52%) were males and 1,366 (48%) were females. Population in the age range 0–6 years was 580. The total number of literate persons in Kotal Pukur was 1,294 (57.82% of the population over 6 years).

== Civic administration ==
=== Police station ===
Kotalpokhar police station serves the Barharwa CD block.

== Transport ==
Kotalpokhar railway station is on the Sahibganj loop.

== Education ==
Kotalpokhar High School is a Hindi-medium coeducational institution established in 1956. It has facilities for teaching in classes IX and X.

== See also ==
- Shibganj, Chapai Nawabganj, home to a Kotalpokhari diaspora
