= Salahuddin Quader Chowdhury =

Bangladeshi politician (1949–2015)

- সালাউদ্দিন কাদের চৌধুরী
- Chowdhury at a 2010 press conference

Minister of Health and Family Welfare
- In office 9 July 1986 – 23 January 1988
- President: Hussain Muhammad Ershad
- Prime Minister: Ataur Rahman Khan; Mizanur Rahman Chowdhury
- Preceded by: Mohammed Abdul Matin
- Succeeded by: Mohammed Abdul Matin

Minister of Housing and Public Works
- In office 25 May 1986 – 9 July 1986
- President: Hussain Muhammad Ershad
- Prime Minister: Ataur Rahman Khan
- Preceded by: Abdul Mannan Siddique
- Succeeded by: K.M. Aminul Islam

Member of Parliament
- In office 25 January 2009 – 24 January 2014
- Preceded by: L. K. Siddiqi
- Succeeded by: Syed Nazibul Bashar Maizvandary
- Constituency: Chittagong-2
- In office 19 March 1996 – 27 October 2006
- Preceded by: Md Yousuf
- Succeeded by: Moin Uddin Khan Badal
- Constituency: Chittagong-7
- In office 5 March 1991 – 24 November 1995
- Preceded by: Ziauddin Ahmed Bablu
- Succeeded by: Golam Akbar Khondakar
- Constituency: Chittagong-6
- In office 7 May 1986 – 3 March 1988
- Preceded by: A. M. Zahiruddin Khan
- Succeeded by: Ziauddin Ahmed Bablu
- Constituency: Chittagong-6
- In office 18 February 1979 – 7 May 1986
- Preceded by: M. A. Manan
- Succeeded by: Giasuddin Quader Chowdhury
- Constituency: Chittagong-7

Personal details
- Born: 13 March 1949 Chittagong, East Bengal, Dominion of Pakistan
- Died: 22 November 2015 (aged 66) Old Dhaka Central Jail, Dhaka, Bangladesh
- Cause of death: Execution by hanging
- Resting place: Raozan Upazila, Chittagong
- Party: Bangladesh Nationalist Party
- Other political affiliations: National Democratic Party; Bangladesh Muslim League; Jatiya Party (Ershad)
- Height: 6 ft 2 in (1.88m)
- Spouse: Farhat Quader Chowdhury
- Relations: Saifuddin Quader Chowdhury (brother); Gias Uddin Quader Chowdhury (brother); Salman F Rahman (cousin)
- Children: Fazlul; Humam; Farzeen
- Parents: A.K.M. Fazlul Quader Chowdhury (father); Selima Quader Chowdhury (mother)
- Relatives: Chowdhuries of Chittagong
- Education: Sadiq Public School; Notre Dame College, Dhaka; University of Punjab
- Occupation: Politician; Businessman

Salahuddin Quader Chowdhury (Bengali: সালাউদ্দিন কাদের চৌধুরী; (13 March 1949 – 22 November 2015) was a Bangladeshi politician and minister, a six-term member of the Jatiya Sangsad, and a member of the Bangladesh Nationalist Party (BNP) Standing Committee. He served as a minister in two ministries under the Ershad ministry, and later served as the Adviser on Parliamentary Affairs to Prime Minister Khaleda Zia from 2001 to 2006. He was the son of late Convention Muslim League leader A.K.M. Fazlul Quader Chowdhury.

On 1 October 2013, he was convicted of 9 of 23 charges and sentenced to death by the International Crimes Tribunal of Bangladesh for crimes during the 1971 Bangladesh War of Independence. However, limitations placed on his defense testimony were called "disturbing" by some observers. He was executed by hanging in Old Dhaka Central Jail on 22 November 2015.

== Early life ==
Chowdhury was born on 13 March 1949 in Gahira village. He was from a political family of Raozan Upazila in erstwhile East Pakistan. His father, Fazlul Quader Chowdhury, was a Speaker of Pakistan National Assembly and Acting President of Pakistan from time to time before the independence of Bangladesh. He was the eldest among the six siblings. He received his education from the boarding school, Sadiq Public School at Bahawalpur, Pakistan.

== Career ==
Chowdhury was a member of the Bangladesh Parliament and of the standing committee of Bangladesh Nationalist Party (BNP).

Chowdhury was a seven-term Member of Parliament, generally representing Rangunia and/or Boalkhali Upazilas, starting with constituency Chittagong-7 in 1979. He was elected for Chittagong-6 in 1986 and 1991. He was elected for Chittagong-7 again in 1996, and re-elected in 2001. He ran a failed campaign to be elected secretary general of the Organisation of Islamic Conference. Opposition member of parliament, Shuranjit Sengupta, demanded the resignation of M Morshed Khan over the failed bid and in response Chowdhury said, "He should at first be circumcised before commenting on an Islamic organisation like the OIC. If he does that I will support his demand for the foreign minister's resignation,". Chowdhury's final term, to which he was elected in 2008, was for Chittagong-2.

== War crimes trial ==
Hummam Quader Chowdhury, son of BNP leader Salauddin Quader Chowdhury, who was executed for 1971 war crimes, has expressed hope that he can prove his father's "innocence" and expose what he calls a "judicial killing". The family of executed BNP leader Salauddin Quader Chowdhury will send a legal notice to the Ministry of Foreign Affairs on Sunday, seeking evidence to support their claim that he was subjected to a ‘judicial killing’ by the International Crimes Tribunal (ICT).

Chowdhury was arrested 2011 from his "safe house" in Dhanmondi and questioned by the special branch of police, where he was reportedly tortured. The trial for his involvement in the 1971 Bangladesh genocide were due to begin in August 2011.

=== War crime charges ===
Among the charges submitted against Chowdhury in the International Crimes Tribunal were:

1. Abduction of 7 Hindus and killing 6 of them on 4–5 April 1971 in Matilal House.
2. Accompanying Pakistan army at the time of killing Maddhya Gohira Hindu Parha in Raozan on 13 April 1971.
3. Kundeshwari, Killing of Nutan Chandra on April 13
4. Jagatmalla Para Mass Killings on April 13
5. Sultanpur Mass Killing on April 13
6. Unosottor Para Mass Killing on April 13
7. Raozan Municipality Killing (Satish Chandra) on April 14
8. Mozaffar Ahmed (with son) ACTM (abduction confinement torture and murder) on April 17
9. Murder, loot, rape at Manik Dhar’s house After April 13

=== Trial ===
During Chowdhury's trial the prosecution summoned 41 witnesses to testify while four were called in his defense. Commenting on the trial, the former United States Ambassador-at-Large for War Crimes Issues, Stephen Rapp, said that it was "disturbing" that limitations were placed on defense testimony. Affidavits stating that Chowdhury was in Pakistan and studying law at the University of Punjab at the time of the crimes were not considered. Defense testimony from a former prime minister of Pakistan and a former American ambassador was not allowed by the court.

=== Conviction ===
On 1 October 2013, the International Crimes Tribunal of Bangladesh sentenced Chowdhury to death by hanging for nine out of the 23 charges brought against him. His party BNP argued that the trial is politically motivated. On 18 November 2015, Bangladesh Supreme Court dismissed the appeal of Chowdhury, upholding the death sentence.

== Execution ==
On 22 November 2015, at 12:45 in the morning, Chowdhury was executed by hanging at Dhaka Central Jail. Another convict, Ali Ahsan Mohammad Mojaheed, was also executed around the same time. Law Minister Anisul Huq claimed that Chowdhury and Mojaheed submitted a plea for mercy, which Chowdhury's family denied. Chowdhury was buried at his village home in Raozan Upazila, Chittagong on 22 November 2015.

== Personal life ==
Chowdhury was married to Farhat Quader Chowdhury. Farhat is the daughter of Alamgir Mohammad Adel (brother of Jahangir Mohammad Adel) and Laili Chowdhury (daughter of Lal Miah, zamindar of Faridpur). Their children include Farzin, Hummam (born 1983) and Fazlul. In August 2016, Human Rights Watch and Amnesty International alleged that Hummam was arrested on 4 August 2016, and disappeared. Amnesty says multiple credible sources place him at Rapid Action Battalion (RAB) headquarters in Dhaka on 12 August, but authorities have denied having him in custody. Hummam returned home in March 2017. Hummam is married to the granddaughter of industrialist A. K. Khan.

Chowdhury's brother, Giasuddin Quader Chowdhury, was a member of parliament from Bangladesh Nationalist Party. Other two brothers were Saifuddin and Jamaluddin. Industrialist brothers Salman F Rahman and Sohel Rahman were their cousins. On 3 January 2005, he met Sheikh Hasina and invited her to his son Faiyyaz's wedding. Hasina said that she couldn't attend the wedding due to security concerns after the 2004 Dhaka grenade attack. There were accusations that Salahuddin was involved in the grenade attack on Sheikh Hasina, to which Salahuddin replied that had he been behind the attack, the grenade wouldn't have missed Hasina.

== Wealth ==
The QC family is one of the wealthiest families in Bangladesh. His wealth was estimated to be around Tk. 1,000 crore. He owned a house in Dhaka's Dhanmondi area located on Road 10/A. He also owned his family's historic house located on Goods Hill in Rahmatganj (Chittagong) and three other houses in the Gohira village of Raozan Upazila, where he also owned hundreds of acres of land. Salahuddin and his brothers owned the QC Group based in Chittagong. The QC Group consists of:

- QC Shipping Ltd.
- QC Container Line Ltd.
- QC Logistics Ltd.
- QC Navigation Ltd.
- QC Feeders Ltd.
- QC Shipping Pte. Ltd. (domiciled in Singapore)
- Eastern Maritime Ltd.
- QC Trading Ltd.
- QC Petroleum Ltd.
- QC Estate Ltd
- QC Holdings Ltd.
- QC Properties Ltd.
- QC Enterprises Ltd.
- The Dacca Dyeing & Manufacturing Co. Ltd.
- The Dacca Yarn Dyeing Ltd.
- Unitrend Ltd. (Bangladeshi representative of international PR firm McCann Erickson)
- Focus Multimedia Ltd. (holding company of CSB News & Radio Aamar)

=== Alleged Singapore account ===
In 2020, the Anti-Corruption Commission (Bangladesh) traced multiple accounts to Singapore which contained a combined 1 billion USD. The money was laundered there by a Bangladeshi citizen. An ACC official told the Daily Sun newspaper that the money belonged to Salahuddin Quader Chowdhury.

== See also ==
- List of Bangladeshi criminals
