= List of members of the 2nd Provincial Assembly of East Pakistan =

2nd Provincial Assembly
←	1st Provincial Assembly	3rd Provincial Assembly	→
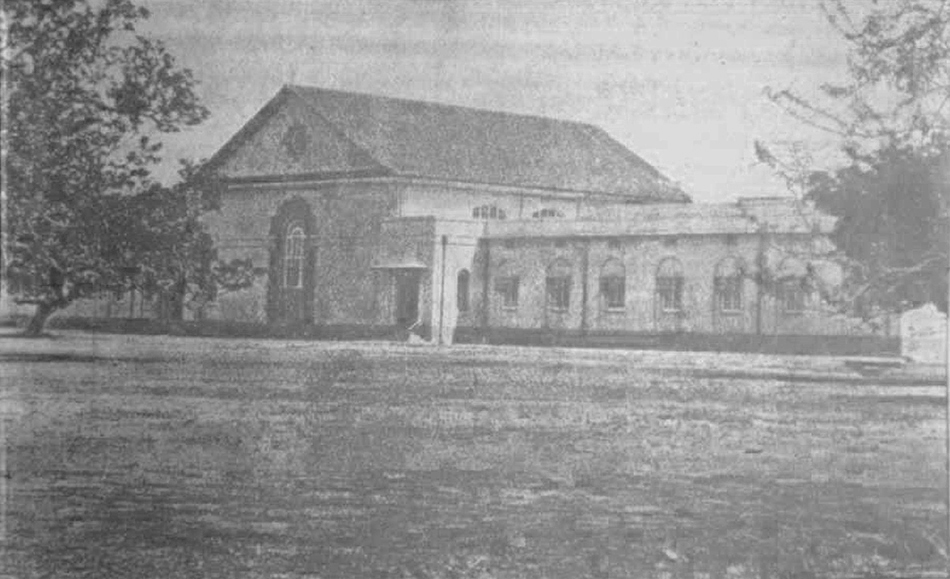
- Assembly House, 1947

Overview
- Legislative body: East Pakistan Provincial Assembly
- Jurisdiction: Pakistan
- Meeting place: Assembly House
- Term: 5 August 1955 – 7 October 1958
- Election: 1954 East Bengal Legislative Assembly election
- Government: First Abu Hussain Sarkar ministry; First Ataur ministry; Second Abu Hussain Sarkar ministry; Second Ataur ministry; Third Abu Hussain Sarkar ministry; Third Ataur ministry

The Second Provincial Assembly of East Pakistan was constituted on 27 June 1955 after East Pakistan's first provincial election. The 2nd Provincial Assembly lasted its incomplete tenure of more than three years and was dissolved on 7 October 1958. The First Session of this Provincial Assembly commenced on 5 August 1955. Total Provincial Assembly seats were 309. The United Front (UF) won 223 seats. They were followed by East Bengal Scheduled Castes Federation (SCF), winning a total of 27 seats. The Pakistan National Congress (PNC) and the Pakistan Muslim League (PML) followed with 24 and 10 seats respectively.

== Provincial Assembly officers ==
#	Position	Name	From	To	Days in office
01	Speaker	Abdul Hakeem	5 August 1955	26 September 1958	
02	Deputy Speaker	Shahed Ali Patwary	5 August 1955	26 September 1958	
02	Deputy Speaker	Syed Ziaul Ahsan	27 September 1958	7 October 1958	
03	Secretary	M. A. Ameen	27 June 1955		
04	Leader of the House	Abu Hussain Sarkar	5 August 1955	30 August 1956	
04	Leader of the House	Ataur Rahman Khan	1 September 1956	7 October 1958	
05	Leader of the Opposition	Ataur Rahman Khan	5 August 1955	30 August 1956	
05	Leader of the Opposition	Abu Hussain Sarkar	1 September 1956	7 October 1958	

== Members ==
=== Muslim constituencies ===
District/Subdivision	Constituency name	Party	Member	Ref
Thakurgaon	Thakurgaon North	Ganatantri Dal	Mirza Ghulam Hafiz	
Thakurgaon	Thakurgaon South	Unknown	Mohammad Dabirul Islam	
Dinajpur	Dinajpur Central	Ganatantri Dal	Haji Mohammad Danesh	
Dinajpur	Dinajpur Sadar West	Unknown	Fazle Haque	
Dinajpur	Dinajpur Sadar East	Unknown	Azizur Rahman	
Dinajpur	Dinajpur Sadar South	Unknown	Rahimuddin Ahmed	
Nilphamari	Nilphamari North	Awami League	Dabir Uddin Ahmed	
Nilphamari	Nilphamari South	Awami League	Khairat Hossain	
Nilphamari	Nilphamari West	Awami League	Zikrul Haque	
Kurigram	Kurigram North	Unknown	Saifur Rahman	
Kurigram	Kurigram West	Unknown	Paniruddin Ahmad	
Kurigram	Kurigram Central	United Front	Md. Abdul Hafiz	
Kurigram	Kurigram South	Unknown	Abdur Rahman Mia	
Rangpur	Rangpur Sadar North	United Front	Abul Hossain	
Rangpur	Rangpur Sadar West	Unknown	Abul Hossain Miah	
Rangpur	Rangpur Sadar East	Unknown	Emaduddin Ahmed	
Rangpur	Rangpur Sadar Central	Unknown	Habibur Rahman Choudhury	
Rangpur	Rangpur Sadar-cum-Gaibandha	Krishak Sramik Party	Abu Hussain Sarkar	
Gaibandha	Gaibandha North	Unknown	Azizul Haque Miah	
Gaibandha	Gaibandha Central	Unknown	Azizar Rahman Khandkar	
Gaibandha	Gaibandha South-West	Unknown	Anamat Ali Prodhan	
Gaibandha	Gaibandha South-East	Krishak Sramik Party	Ahmed Hossain	
Bogra	Bogra North-West	Unknown	Majiruddin Ahmed	
Bogra	Bogra West	Unknown	Jasiruddin Ahmed	
Bogra	Bogra South-West	Unknown	Akbar Ali Khan Choudhury	
Bogra	Bogra North	Unknown	Mufizuddin Ahmed	
Bogra	Bogra North-East	Unknown	Syed Ahmed	
Bogra	Bogra East	Unknown	Dewan Mohiuddin	
Bogra	Bogra Central	Unknown	Mahbubor Rahman Choudhury	
Bogra	Bogra South-East	Unknown	Tasimuddin Talukdar	
Nawabganj	Nawabganj North	Unknown	Latif Hussain	
Nawabganj	Nawabganj West	United Front	Idris Ahmed Mia	
Nawabganj	Nawabganj South-East	Unknown	Tahur Ahmed Choudhury	
Naogaon	Naogaon North	Unknown	Surat Ali Mondal	
Naogaon	Naogaon East	Unknown	Mafizuddin Ahmed	
Naogaon	Naogaon South-East	United Front	Moslem Ali Mollah	
Naogaon	Naogaon South-West	Unknown	Khoda Baksh Choudhury	
Rajshahi	Rajshahi Sadar West	United Front	Mojibar Rahman	
Rajshahi	Rajshahi Sadar Central	Unknown	Shamsul Huq	
Rajshahi	Rajshahi Sadar East	Unknown	Abul Kalam Azad Molla	
Rajshahi	Rajshahi South	Unknown	Ataur Rahman	
Nator	Nator North	Unknown	Kanchu Uddin	
Nator	Nator South-East	Unknown	Abul Qasem Khondkar	
Serajganj	Serajganj North-West	Awami League	Abdur Rashid Tarkabagish	
Serajganj	Serajganj North	Awami League	Muhammad Mansur Ali	
Serajganj	Serajganj Central	Unknown	Syed Akbar Ali	
Serajganj	Serajganj South-East	Muslim League	Mohammad Abdul Matin	
Serajganj	Serajganj South-West	Unknown	Jasim Uddin Ahmed	
Pabna	Pabna Sadar North	Unknown	Abu Md. Yunus Ali	
Pabna	Pabna Sadar South-West	Unknown	Abdul Gafur	
Pabna	Pabna Sadar North-East	United Front	Abdul Awal	
Pabna	Pabna Sadar South-East	Unknown	Raisuddin Ahmed	
Kushtia	Kushtia West	United Front	M. A. Hannan	
Kushtia	Kushtia North	Unknown	Md. Rahatullah Mia	
Kushtia	Kushtia Central	Unknown	Quazi Kafiluddin Ahmed	
Kushtia	Kushtia East	Ganatantri Dal	Syed Altaf Hossain	
Kushtia	Kushtia Central West	Unknown	Riazuddin Ahmed	
Kushtia	Kushtia South	Unknown	Ohid Hossain Joardar	
Jessore	Jessore North	Unknown	Quamaruzzaman	
Jessore	Jessore West	Unknown	Iqbal Anwarul Islam	
Jessore	Jessore South-West	Unknown	Masihur Rahman	
Jessore	Jessore South	Unknown	Syed Shamsur Rahman	
Jessore	Jessore Central	Unknown	Mohammad Mosharraf Hossain	
Jessore	Jessore Central North	United Front	Mir Hasem Ali	
Jessore	Jessore East	United Front	Muhammad Abdul Khaleque	
Jessore	Jessore South-East	Unknown	Md. Abdul Hakim	
Khulna	Khulna North-West	Unknown	Momtaz Ahmed	
Khulna	Khulna Central North	Unknown	Enayetullah	
Khulna	Khulna South-West	Unknown	G. M. Okalat Ali	
Khulna	Khulna Central West	Unknown	Abdul Ghani Khan	
Khulna	Khulna North	Unknown	A. F. M. Abdul Jalil	
Khulna	Khulna Central East	United Front	Sheikh Tayebur Rahman	
Khulna	Khulna North-East	Unknown	Syed Mostagawsal Haque	
Khulna	Khulna South-East	Awami League	Sheikh Abdul Aziz	
Bakarganj	Bakarganj Sadar North-West	Krishak Sramik Party	Abdul Wahab Khan	
Bakarganj	Bakarganj Sadar North	United Front	Abdul Aleem	
Bakarganj	Bakarganj Sadar North-East	Unknown	Aminul Huq Choudhury	
Bakarganj	Bakarganj Sadar Central	Unknown	S. W. Lakitullah	
Bakarganj	Bakarganj Sadar West	Krishak Sramik Party	Syed Azizul Huq	
Bakarganj	Bakarganj Sadar South-West	Unknown	Mohammad Ali Talukdar	
Bakarganj	Bakarganj Sadar South-East	United Front	Khan Fazle Rub Chowdhury	
Pirojpur	Pirojpur West	Krishak Sramik Party	A. K. Fazlul Huq	
Pirojpur	Pirojpur North-East	Unknown	Vacant	
Pirojpur	Pirojpur East	United Front	Syed Ziaul Ahsan	
Pirojpur	Pirojpur South-West	Ganatantri Dal	Mohiuddin Ahmed	
Patuakhali	Patuakhali West	Krishak Sramik Party	Abdul Kader Mia	
Patuakhali	Patuakhali North	Unknown	B. D. Habibullah	
Patuakhali	Patuakhali North-East	Unknown	Md. Emdad Ali	
Patuakhali	Patuakhali East	Unknown	Abdul Karim	
Patuakhali	Patuakhali South	Unknown	Md. Ismail Talukdar	
Bhola	Bhola North-West	Unknown	Vacant	
Bhola	Bhola North-East	Unknown	Farmuzul Huq	
Bhola	Bhola Central	United Front	Majibul Haque Chowdhury	
Bhola	Bhola South	Unknown	Md. Abdur Rashid	
Goalundo	Goalundo West	Unknown	Mohammad Abdur Rahman	
Goalundo	Goalundo North-East	United Front	Abdul Wajed Chowdhury	
Faridpur	Faridpur Sadar North-West	Krishak Sramik Party	Yusuf Ali Chowdhury	
Faridpur	Faridpur Sadar North-East	Unknown	Abdul Hameed Choudhury	
Faridpur	Faridpur Sadar South-West	Unknown	M. A. Wahid	
Faridpur	Faridpur Sadar South-East	Unknown	Kazi Rokonuddin Ahmed	
Gopalganj	Gopalganj North	Awami League	Abdus Salam Khan	
Gopalganj	Gopalganj South	Awami League	Sheikh Mujibur Rahman	
Madaripur	Madaripur South-West	Awami League	Adeluddin Ahmad	
Madaripur	Madaripur Central West	Unknown	Ashmat Ali Khan	
Madaripur	Madaripur North-West	United Front	Dudu Miyan II	
Madaripur	Madaripur Central North	Unknown	Abdur Rashid	
Madaripur	Madaripur North-East	Unknown	Gyasuddin Ahmed Choudhury	
Madaripur	Madaripur South-East	Unknown	Abdur Rashid Sarkar	
Manikganj	Manikganj North-West	United Front	Anwar Uddin Shikdar	
Manikganj	Manikganj East	Unknown	Md. Abdus Sobhan	
Manikganj	Manikganj Central South	Krishak Sramik Party	Abdul Latif Biswas	
Dacca	Dacca Sadar North	Awami League	Shamsul Haq	
Dacca	Dacca Sadar North-East	Awami League	Tajuddin Ahmad	
Dacca	Dacca Sadar Central East	Unknown	Faizur Rahman Khan	
Dacca	Dacca Sadar Central West	Awami League	Ataur Rahman Khan	
Dacca	Dacca Sadar South-East	Unknown	Syed Mohammad Ali	
Dacca	Dacca City East	Unknown	Golam Kader Chowdhury	
Dacca	Dacca City West	Awami League	Yar Mohammad Khan	
Dacca	Dacca Sadar South	Unknown	Serajuddin	
Dacca	Dacca Sadar South-West	Unknown	Abul Akbar Mohammad Abdur Rais	
Narayanganj	Narayanganj North	Unknown	Md. Shahidullah	
Narayanganj	Narayanganj Central North	Unknown	Kalimuddin Ahmed	
Narayanganj	Narayanganj North-East	United Front	Aftab Uddin Bhuiyan	
Narayanganj	Narayanganj Central South	Unknown	Tafazzal Hossain	
Narayanganj	Narayanganj South-West	Unknown	Abdul Samad Khan	
Narayanganj	Narayanganj South-East	Unknown	Abdul Awal Miah	
Narayanganj	Narayanganj-South	Unknown	Almas Ali	
Munshiganj	Munshiganj West	Krishak Sramik Party	Kafiluddin Chowdhury	
Munshiganj	Munshiganj Central West	Awami League	Md Korban Ali	
Munshiganj	Munshiganj Central East	Unknown	Vacant	
Munshiganj	Munshiganj East	Unknown	Md. Manir Hossain Jahangir	
Jamalpur	Jamalpur North-West	Unknown	Rafiquddin Ahmed	
Jamalpur	Jamalpur North	Unknown	Naimuddin Ahmed	
Jamalpur	Jamalpur North-East	Unknown	Abdul Hakim Miah	
Jamalpur	Jamalpur Central	United Front	Khondakar Abdul Hamid	
Jamalpur	Jamalpur South	Unknown	Hyder Ali Mallik	
Jamalpur	Jamalpur West	United Front	Giasuddin Ahmed	
Jamalpur	Jamalpur South-West	Unknown	Md. Moazzam Husain	
Tangail	Tangail North	United Front	Hatem Ali Khan	
Tangail	Tangail North-East	Unknown	Azaharul Islam	
Tangail	Tangail Central	Unknown	Ahmed Ali Khan	
Tangail	Tangail South-East	Unknown	Ameer Ali Khan	
Tangail	Tangail	Unknown	Khoda Baksha	
Tangail	Tangail South-West	United Front	Lutfur Rahman Khan	
Tangail	Tangail South	Unknown	Zamiruddin Ahmed	
Mymensingh	Mymensingh Sadar North	Unknown	Syed Faizur Rahman	
Mymensingh	Mymensingh Sadar Central North	Nizam-e-Islam Party	Abdul Wahed Bokainagari	
Mymensingh	Mymensingh Sadar Central East	United Front	Hashimuddin Ahmed	
Mymensingh	Mymensingh Sadar South-East	Awami League	Khaleque Nawaz Khan	
Mymensingh	Mymensingh Sadar Central	Unknown	Altaf Hossain	
Mymensingh	Mymensingh Sadar North-West	Unknown	Mohammad Kalamali	
Mymensingh	Mymensingh Sadar West	Unknown	Maizuddin Ahmed	
Mymensingh	Mymensingh Sadar Central South	Awami League	Abul Mansur Ahmad	
Mymensingh	Mymensingh Sadar South	United Front	Shamsul Huda Panchbagi	
Netrakona	Netrakona North	Unknown	Aktaruzzaman	
Netrakona	Netrakona West	Unknown	Aftabuddin Ahmed	
Netrakona	Netrakona-East	Unknown	Manzarul Haque	
Netrakona	Netrakona South-West	Unknown	Insan Bhuiya	
Netrakona	Netrakona-cum-Kishoreganj	Unknown	Syed Sharfuddin Husain	
Kishoreganj	Kishoreganj North-West	Unknown	Abu Ahmed	
Kishoreganj	Kishoreganj West	Nizam-e-Islam Party	Athar Ali	
Kishoreganj	Kishoreganj South-West	United Front	Khurshid Uddin Ahmed	
Kishoreganj	Kishoreganj Central South	United Front	Mohammad Saidur Rahman	
Kishoreganj	Kishoreganj South-East	Unknown	Muazzamuddin Hossain	
Kishoreganj	Kishoreganj South	Unknown	Serajul Huq	
Sunamganj	Sunamganj North-West	Unknown	Shahed Ali	
Sunamganj	Sunamganj North	Ganatantri Dal	Mahmud Ali	
Sunamganj	Sunamganj North-East	Unknown	Fazlul Karim	
Sunamganj	Sunamganj South	Awami League	Abdus Samad Azad	
North Sylhet	North Sylhet North	United Front	Mokbul Hossain	
North Sylhet	North Sylhet North-East	United Front	MA Latif	
North Sylhet	North Sylhet South-East	Unknown	Sakhawatul Ambia Choudhury	
North Sylhet	North Sylhet Central West	Unknown	Muhammad Abdulla	
North Sylhet	North Sylhet South-West	Unknown	M. Abdul Hamid	
South Sylhet	South Sylhet North-East	Unknown	Mahibus Samad	
South Sylhet	South Sylhet North-West	Unknown	Ahmadur Rahman Khan	
South Sylhet	South Sylhet-cum-Habiganj	Krishak Sramik Party	Md. Keramat Ali	
Habiganj	Habiganj North-East	Unknown	Rafiqueuddin Mahmud Chaudhuri	
Habiganj	Habiganj North-West	United Front	Qamarul Ahsan	
Habiganj	Habiganj Central South	Unknown	Nasiruddin Chaudhury	
Brahmanbaria	Brahmanbaria North	Ganatantri Dal	Dewan Mahbub Ali	
Brahmanbaria	Brahmanbaria Central	United Front	Abdur Rahman Khan	
Brahmanbaria	Brahmanbaria South-East	Unknown	Vacant	
Brahmanbaria	Brahmanbaria Central West	Unknown	Abul Khair Rafiqul Hussain	
Brahmanbaria	Brahmanbaria South-West	Unknown	A. K. M. Zahirul Haq	
Tippera (Sadar)	Tippera Sadar North-West	Unknown	Muhammad Abdur Rub	
Tippera (Sadar)	Tippera Sadar West	Awami League	Khondaker Mostaq Ahmad	
Tippera (Sadar)	Tippera Sadar North	Unknown	Mohammad Harunur Rashid Choudhury	
Tippera (Sadar)	Tippera Sadar Central North	Ganatantri Dal	Muzaffar Ahmed	
Tippera (Sadar)	Tippera Sadar North-East	Independent politician	Abdul Gani	
Tippera (Sadar)	Tippera Sadar Central South-West	United Front	Ramizuddin Ahmed	
Tippera (Sadar)	Tippera Sadar Central East	Nizam-e-Islam Party	Ashrafuddin Ahmad Chowdhury	
Tippera (Sadar)	Tippera Sadar South	United Front	Kazi Zahirul Qayyum	
Tippera (Sadar)	Tippera Sadar South-East	Unknown	Abu Nazib Mohammad Nurur Rahman	
Tippera (Sadar)	Tippera Sadar Central South	Unknown	M. Syed Serajul Haq	
Tippera (Sadar)	Tippera Sadar Central West	Unknown	Mohammad Osman	
Chandpur	Chandpur East	Unknown	Majibul Huq Majumdar	
Chandpur	Chandpur Central East	United Front	Abdul Karim	
Chandpur	Chandpur North-West	United Front	Habibur Rahman	
Chandpur	Chandpur Central West	Krishak Sramik Party	Shahed Ali Patwary	
Chandpur	Chandpur South-West	Unknown	Muhammad Abdul Hamid Majumdar	
Chandpur	Chandpur South-East	United Front	Md. Wali Ullah	
Noakhali	Noakhali Sadar North-West	United Front	Ghulam Sarwar Hussaini	
Noakhali	Noakhali Sadar West	Unknown	Syeduzzaman Mia	
Noakhali	Noakhali Sadar Central West	Unknown	Zillur Rahim	
Noakhali	Noakhali Sadar South-West	Awami League	Mohammad Toaha	
Noakhali	Noakhali Sadar South	Unknown	Moulana Abul Hasanat Mahammad Abdul Hai	
Noakhali	Noakhali Sadar South-East	Unknown	Mozammel Hossain	
Noakhali	Noakhali Sadar Central South	Unknown	Majibar Rahman	
Noakhali	Noakhali Sadar Central	United Front	Serajuddin Ahmad	
Noakhali	Noakhali Sadar Central North	Unknown	Razzaqul Haider Chowdhury	
Noakhali	Noakhali Sadar East	Unknown	Nururzzaman Chowdhury	
Feni	Feni North West	Ganatantri Dal	Khawaja Ahmed	
Feni	Feni East	Unknown	Abdus Salam	
Feni	Feni South	Unknown	Abdul Jabbar Khaddar	
Chittagong (Sadar)	Chittagong Sadar-North-West	United Front	Mahfuzul Huq	
Chittagong (Sadar)	Chittagong Sadar North-East-cum-Ramgarh	Unknown	Ubaidul Akbar	
Chittagong (Sadar)	Chittagong Sadar West	Krishak Sramik Party	Mahmudunnabi Chowdhury	
Chittagong (Sadar)	Chittagong Sadar Central North	Unknown	A. B. M. Sultanul Alam Chowdhury	
Chittagong (Sadar)	Chittagong Sadar East-cum-Rangamati	Independent politician	A. K. M. Fazlul Quader Chowdhury	
Chittagong (Sadar)	Chittagong City	Awami League	Zahur Ahmad Chowdhury	
Chittagong (Sadar)	Chittagong Sadar Central East	Unknown	M. A. Quasem	
Chittagong (Sadar)	Chittagong Sadar Central West	Unknown	Akhtar Kamal Ahmed	
Chittagong (Sadar)	Chittagong Sadar South-West	Unknown	Mohammad Ashabuddin	
Chittagong (Sadar)	Chittagong Sadar South-East-cum-Bandarban	Unknown	Muhammadur Rahman	
Cox's Bazar	Cox's Bazar North-East	Unknown	Firoze Ahmed Choudhury	
Cox's Bazar	Cox's Bazar West	United Front	Siddique Ahmad	
Cox's Bazar	Cox's Bazar South	Nizam-e-Islam Party	Farid Ahmad	

=== General constituencies ===
District/Division	Constituency name	Party	Member	Ref
Rajshahi Division	Rajshahi Division North	Unknown	Brojo Madhab Das	
Rajshahi Division	Rajshahi Division North-East	Unknown	Suresh Chandra Dasgupta	
Rajshahi Division	Rajshahi Division Central North-West	United Progressive Party	Pravash Chandra Lahiry	
Rajshahi Division	Rajshahi Division Central East	Unknown	Kshitish Chandra Biswas	
Rajshahi Division	Rajshahi Division Central West	Pakistan National Congress	Bhupendra Kumar Datta	
Rajshahi Division	Rajshahi Division Central South	Unknown	Bejoy Chandra Roy	
Rajshahi Division	Rajshahi Division South-West	Unknown	Debendra Nath Das	
Rajshahi Division	Rajshahi Division South-East	Unknown	Khetra Nath Mitra	
Bakarganj	Bakarganj North-East	Unknown	Debendra Nath Ghose	
Bakarganj	Bakarganj South-West	Unknown	Pran Kumar Sen	
Faridpur	Faridpur West	Unknown	Ramesh Chandra Dutt	
Faridpur	Faridpur East	Unknown	Phani Bhushan Majumder	
Dacca	Dacca West	Unknown	Munindra Nath Bhattacherjee	
Dacca	Dacca Central	Unknown	Bejoy Bhusan Chatterjee	
Dacca	Dacca East	Unknown	Radha Madhab Das	
Mymensingh	Mymensingh West	Unknown	Sudhanshu Sekhar Saha	
Mymensingh	Mymensingh Central	Pakistan National Congress	Manoranjan Dhar	
Mymensingh	Mymensingh East	United Front	Trailokyanath Chakravarty	
Sylhet	Sylhet North-West	Pakistan National Congress	Prasun Kanti Roy	
Sylhet	Sylhet North-East	Pakistan National Congress	Basanta Kumar Das	
Sylhet	Sylhet South	Unknown	Purnendu Kishore Sengupta	
Sylhet	Sylhet South-West	Unknown	Jogendra Chandra Deb Roy	
Tippera	Tippera North	United Progressive Party	Dhirendranath Datta	
Tippera	Tippera Central	Unknown	Ashutosh Singha	
Tippera	Tippera South	Unknown	Prakash Chandra Das	
Noakhali	Noakhali West	Unknown	Haran Chandra Ghosh Choudhury	
Noakhali	Noakhali-cum-Chittagong North	Unknown	Pulin Behari De	
Chittagong	Chittagong	Communist Party of Pakistan	Purnendu Dastidar	
Chittagong	Chittagong South	Unknown	Sudhansu Bimal Dutt	
Chittagong	Chittagong Hill Tracts	Independent politician	Birendra Kishore Roaza	

=== Scheduled Castes constituencies ===
District	Constituency name	Party	Member	Ref
Dinajpur	Dinajpur North	Unknown	Bhabesh Chandra Singha	
Dinajpur	Dinajpur Central	Unknown	Durga Mohan Roy	
Dinajpur	Dinajpur South	Unknown	Gazendra Nath Roy Choudhury	
Rangpur	Rangpur Central	East Pakistan Scheduled Castes Federation	Canteswar Barman	
Rangpur	Rangpur North-West	Unknown	Abhoy Charan Barman	
Rangpur	Rangpur East	Unknown	Amarendra Nath Roy	
Bogra	Bogra-cum-Pabna	East Pakistan Scheduled Castes Federation	Dhirendra Nath Saha	
Rajshahi	Rajshahi West	Unknown	Sagram Majhi	
Rajshahi	Rajshahi East	Unknown	Rishiraj Roy Burman	
Pabna	Pabna-cum-Kushtia	Unknown	Madhu Sudan Sarkar	
Jessore	Jessore West	Unknown	Sarat Chandra Majumdar	
Jessore	Jessore East	Unknown	Susanta Kumar Biswas	
Khulna	Khulna North-West	Unknown	Khagendra Nath Biswas	
Khulna	Khulna South	Unknown	Vacant	
Khulna	Khulna North-East	Unknown	Bidhan Bhusan Roy	
Bakarganj	Bakarganj Sadar South	Unknown	Jitendra Nath Sircar	
Bakarganj	Bakarganj South	East Pakistan Scheduled Castes Federation	Kuber Chandra Biswas	
Bakarganj	Bakarganj West	Unknown	Chittaranjan Sutar	
Bakarganj	Bakarganj North-East	Unknown	Sarat Chandra Bal	
Bakarganj	Bakarganj South-West	East Pakistan Scheduled Castes Federation	Manoranjan Sikder	
Faridpur	Faridpur North-East	East Pakistan Scheduled Castes Federation	Gour Chandra Bala	
Faridpur	Faridpur North-West	Unknown	Nil Kamal Sarkar	
Faridpur	Faridpur South	Unknown	Nagendra Nath Talukder	
Faridpur	Faridpur South-West	Unknown	Sashilal Sankar Halder	
Dacca	Dacca West	East Pakistan Scheduled Castes Federation	Dhananjoy Roy	
Dacca	Dacca East	Unknown	Santosh Chandra Das	
Dacca	Dacca Central	Unknown	Rajani Mandal	
Mymensingh	Mymensingh West	Unknown	Rai Charan Roy	
Mymensingh	Mymensingh Central	Unknown	Gurucharan Das	
Mymensingh	Mymensingh East	Unknown	Prasun Kanti Barman	
Sylhet	Sylhet North	East Pakistan Scheduled Castes Federation	Akshay Kumar Das	
Sylhet	Sylhet South-West	Unknown	Kali Prasanna Das Choudhury	
Sylhet	Sylhet South-East	Unknown	Ram Surat	
Tippera	Tippera North	Unknown	Prafulla Choudhury	
Tippera	Tippera and Noakhali	Unknown	Rasaraj Charan Bhowmik	
Chittagong	Chittagong-cum-Chittagong Hill Tracts-cum-Noakhali	Unknown	Sarat Chandra Majumdar	

=== Women's constituencies ===
Group	Constituency name	Party	Member	Ref
Muslim	Dinajpur-cum-Rangpur-cum-Bogra	Awami League	Daulatunnessa Khatun	
Muslim	Rajshahi-cum-Pabna	Awami League	Selina Banu	
Muslim	Faridpur-cum-Kushtia-cum-Jessore-cum-Khulna	Awami League	Badrunnessa Ahmed	
Muslim	Bakarganj	Awami League	Razia Banu	
Muslim	Dacca City West	Awami League	Anwara Khatun	
Muslim	Dacca-cum-Narayanganj	Awami League	Nurjahan Murshid	
Muslim	Mymensingh	Unknown	Meherunnessa Khatun	
Muslim	Tippera-cum-Sylhet	Awami League	Amena Begum	
Muslim	Chittagong-cum-Noakhali	Unknown	Terunnessa Begum	
General	General	Pakistan National Congress	Nellie Sengupta	
Scheduled Caste	Rajshahi Division	Unknown	Junda Basini Sarkar	
Scheduled Caste	Dacca-cum-Chittagong Division	Unknown	Nellie Mondal	

=== Special constituencies ===
Group	Constituency name	Party	Member	Ref
Christian	Pakistan Christian	Pakistan National Congress	Peter Paul Gomez	
Buddhist	Chittagong Hill Tracts	Independent politician	Kamini Mohan Dewan	
Buddhist	Bakarganj	Unknown	Sudhangshu Bimal Barua	

== Membership changes ==
Year of change	Constituency name	Party	Member	Ref
1956	Brahmanbaria South-East (Muslim)	Awami League	Abdul Gani Munshi	
1956	Munshiganj Central-East (Muslim)	Awami League	Badshah Miah	
1956	Pirojpur North-East (Muslim)	Awami League	Zainul Abedin	
1956	Pirojpur West (Muslim)	Awami League	Nuruddin Ahmad	
1956	North Sylhet Central-West (Muslim)	Awami League	Mohammad Habibur Rahman	
1956	Bhola North-West (Muslim)	Nizam-e-Islam Party	Motiur Rahman Shah	
1956	Satkhira (scheduled castes)	Pakistan National Congress	Jagadish Chandra Bala	
1957	Madaripur North East (Muslim)			
1957	Sirajganj Centre (Muslim)			
1957	Rangpur Sadar Centre (Muslim)	Awami League	Sirajul Islam Mia	
