= Third Ataur ministry =

Ninth Cabinet of East Pakistan

Third Ministry of Ataur Rahman Khan
- 9th Cabinet of East Pakistan
- 1958
- Date formed: 25 August 1958
- Date dissolved: 7 October 1958

People and organisations
- Governor: Sultanuddin Ahmad
- Chief Minister: Ataur Rahman Khan
- No. of ministers: 6
- Total no. of members: 6
- Member party: AL; PNC
- Status in legislature: Majority 156 / 307 (51%)
- Opposition party: KSP; UPP
- Opposition leader: Abu Hussain Sarkar

History
- Election: 1954
- Outgoing election: 1946
- Legislature term: 2nd East Pakistan Provincial Assembly
- Predecessor: Sarkar III
- Successor: Faruque

The Third Ataur ministry was the ninth cabinet formed in East Pakistan, Pakistan's eastern province. It was formed under the leadership of Ataur Rahman Khan of the All-Pakistan Awami League (AL) following the fall of the Third Sarkar ministry and two months of governor’s rule, and it lasted for nearly one month, after which it was replaced by the Faruque ministry following another four-year period of another governor’s rule.

== Background ==
On 18 June 1958, the Second Ataur ministry led by the Awami League (AL) fell as a result of a no-confidence vote by the opposition parties of the East Pakistan Legislative Assembly, including the Krishak Sramik Party (KSP). Consequently, in 20 June, the three-member Third Sarkar ministry was sworn in under the leadership of Abu Hussain Sarkar. However, in the meantime, a no-confidence motion was raised in the assembly against the new cabinet. Eventually, with the support of the National Awami Party (NAP), the new cabinet was defeated by 14 votes, leading to its fall. However, according to a report by the provincial governor Sultanuddin Ahmad, the central cabinet imposed governor's rule in East Pakistan until 24 August. After the period of governor's rule ended, in 25 August, governor Ahmad invited Ataur Rahman Khan of the AL to form a new cabinet. As a result, a new cabinet was formed on the same day. As the new Chief Minister, Khan announced to expand the cabinet before 9 September by including members from other parties, including the NAP. The following day, portfolios were distributed among the six members of the cabinet.

== Fall ==
On 7 October 1958, martial law was imposed in Pakistan by order of the interim president Iskander Mirza, as a result of which the provincial cabinet and the provincial assembly were dissolved. Subsequently, on 27 October, Mirza transferred state power to field marshal Ayub Khan. On 6 May 1962, the provincial assembly elections were held, resulting in the election of 155 provincial assembly members. The following day, governor Azam Khan, resigned, with the resignation announced to take effect on 11 May 1962. On 11 May 1962, it was reported that president Khan and the new governor Ghulam Faruque Khan were searching for suitable individuals for a new cabinet and were preparing a proposed list of ministers. Between May and July, the formation of the newly established Faruque ministry for the province was completed.

== Members ==
The cabinet consisted of the following ministers:

Cabinet members
Portfolio	Minister	Took office	Left office	Party
Office of the Chief Minister	Ataur Rahman Khan	25 August 1958	7 October 1958	AL
Agriculture, Works and Irrigation Department	Muhammad Abdul Khaleque	25 August 1958	7 October 1958	AL
Local Government, Revenue, Forests and Law Department	Kafiluddin Chowdhury	25 August 1958	7 October 1958	AL
Finance and Minority Affairs Department	Manoranjan Dhar	25 August 1958	7 October 1958	PNC
Public Health and Public Health Engineering Department	Dhirendranath Datta	25 August 1958	7 October 1958	PNC
Labour, Industries and Commerce Department	Muhammad Mansur Ali	25 August 1958	7 October 1958	AL
