= First Ataur ministry =

Fifth cabinet of East-Pakistan

First Ministry of Ataur Rahman Khan
- 5th Cabinet of East Pakistan
- 1956–1958
- Date formed: 5 September 1956
- Date dissolved: 31 March 1958

People and organisations
- Governor: A. K. Fazlul Huq
- Chief Minister: Ataur Rahman Khan
- No. of ministers: 10
- Ministers removed: 3
- Total no. of members: 13
- Member party: AL; PNC; GD; UPP; Independent
- Status in legislature: Majority 195 / 309 (63%)
- Opposition party: KSP; NIP; SCF; UPP
- Opposition leader: Abu Hussain Sarkar

History
- Election: 1954
- Outgoing election: 1946
- Legislature term: 2nd East Pakistan Provincial Assembly
- Predecessor: Sarkar I
- Successor: Sarkar II

The First Ataur ministry was the fifth cabinet formed in East Pakistan, the eastern province of Pakistan. It was constituted under the leadership of Ataur Rahman Khan, leader of the East Pakistan Awami League, following the dissolution of the First Abu Hussain Sarkar ministry after the commencement of the 2nd East Pakistan Provincial Assembly. The cabinet lasted for approximately one and a half years before being replaced by the Second Abu Hussain Sarkar ministry.

== Background ==
As a result of the issues surrounding the Constitution of Pakistan and the joint electorate system, the Hindu members withdrew their support, and the First Abu Hussain Sarkar ministry of East Pakistan soon realized that its dissolution was inevitable. Consequently, its members resigned on 30 August 1956. On the other hand, the Awami League (AL) reached an understanding with various minority-based political parties on several demands, including the Five-Point Programme. In 4 September, in reaction to the East Pakistan Rifles opening fire at an AL rally, killing four people and injuring several others, protests erupted in Dacca (present-day Dhaka, Bangladesh). In this situation, Section 144 was imposed, and the leaders of the Krishak Sramik Party (KSP), the major constituent party of the United Front (UF) that had been leading the cabinet, went into hiding. Under these circumstances, governor A. K. Fazlul Huq invited the AL to form the cabinet. On 5 September 1956, the AL formed a new five-member cabinet in East Pakistan, and they were sworn in the following day. On 19 September 1956, portfolios were allocated among the members of the expanded cabinet. Subsequently, Sheikh Mujibur Rahman and Mahmud Ali resigned from the cabinet. On 1 September 1957, Chief Minister Ataur Rahman Khan stated that responsibilities might soon be redistributed instead of immediately filling the vacant posts.

== Dissolution ==
In March 1957, the provincial governor amended the law by reducing the number of votes required for no-confidence motions from 130 to 104. Meanwhile, the party president Abdul Hamid Khan Bhashani resigned from the AL and formed the National Awami Party (NAP), leading a faction of the party to join the new organization. On 21 March 1958, two days after 11 AL leaders defected from the party, Abu Hussain Sarkar, the Leader of the Opposition, moved a vote of no confidence against the cabinet. However, the motion was rejected due to insufficient votes. On 30 March 1958, when the provincial governor instructed the chief minister to resign, he refused to comply. Consequently, governor A. K. Fazlul Huq dismissed chief minister Ataur Rahman Khan, resulting in the dissolution of his cabinet. On the same day, the governor invited Abu Hussain Sarkar to form a new cabinet, and he was sworn in that very day.

== Members ==
The cabinet consisted of the following ministers:

Cabinet members
Portfolio	Minister	Took office	Left office	Party
Public Safety, Planning, Education, Relief and Rehabilitation Department	Ataur Rahman Khan	6 September 1956	31 March 1958	AL
Public Works, Communications, Flood Control and Forests Department	Kafiluddin Chowdhury	6 September 1956	31 March 1958	AL
Local Self-Government and Information Department	Mashiur Rahman	19 September 1956	31 March 1958	AL
Agriculture, Animal Husbandry and Veterinary Services Department	Khairat Hossain	19 September 1956	31 March 1958	AL
Cooperatives, Agricultural Credit and Marketing Department	Abdur Rahman Khan	19 September 1956	31 March 1958	AL
Justice, Law and Registration Department	Muhammad Mansur Ali	19 September 1956	31 March 1958	AL
Finance and Minority Affairs Department	Manoranjan Dhar	19 September 1956	31 March 1958	PNC
Medical and Public Health Department	Dhirendranath Datta	19 September 1956	31 March 1958	UPP
Excise and Salt Department	Sarat Chandra Majumdar	19 September 1956	31 March 1958	PNC
Forest and Food Department	Gour Chandra Bala	14 January 1957	31 March 1958	SCF

== Former members ==
Cabinet members
Portfolio	Minister	Took office	Left office	Party
Education Department	Abul Mansur Ahmad	6 September 1956	12 September 1956	AL
Commerce, Labour and Industry, Agricultural Industrial Development, Social Welfare, Rural Development and Anti-Corruption Department	Sheikh Mujibur Rahman	6 September 1956	8 August 1957	AL
Revenue, Estate Acquisition and Prisons Department	Mahmud Ali	6 September 1956	1 September 1957	Ganatantri Dal
