= First Abu Hussain Sarkar ministry =

Fourth cabinet of East Pakistan

First Ministry of Abu Hussain Sarkar
- 4th Cabinet of East Pakistan
- 1955–1956
- Date formed: 6 June 1955
- Date dissolved: 30 August 1956

People and organisations
- Governor: Muhammad Shahabuddin; Amiruddin Ahmad; A. K. Fazlul Huq
- Chief Minister: Abu Hussain Sarkar
- No. of ministers: 12
- Ministers removed: 4
- Total no. of members: 16
- Member party: United Front: KSP; AML; NIP; PNC; UPP; SCF
- Status in legislature: Majority 195 / 309 (63%)
- Opposition party: AL; GD
- Opposition leader: Ataur Rahman Khan

History
- Election: 1954
- Outgoing election: 1946
- Legislature term: 2nd East Pakistan Provincial Assembly
- Predecessor: Huq III
- Successor: Ataur I

The First Sarkar ministry was the fourth cabinet formed in East Bengal (later renamed East Pakistan), the eastern province of Pakistan. It was formed after the Third Huq ministry formed by 1954 legislative assembly election. The cabinet was led by Abu Hussain Sarkar, leader of the Krishak Sramik Party (KSP), and remained in office for nearly one year before being replaced by the First Ataur ministry.

== Background ==
In March 1954, the four-party alliance United Front (UF) won a landslide victory in the first provincial election of East Bengal, securing 228 of the 309 seats. On 3 April, party leader A. K. Fazlul Huq formed a new cabinet at Government House as the new provincial prime minister. In 30 May, citing the provincial cabinet's inability to deal with the emergency situation and concerns over public security, governor-general Malik Ghulam Muhammad imposed governor's rule in the province and suspended the cabinet. Former provincial prime minister Huq was subsequently placed under house arrest. Around 1,600 UF activists were arrested on charges of anti-government activities, including 30 members of the Legislative Assembly. Governor’s rule was lifted on 5 June 1955, resulting in the restoration of the cabinet. Huq resigned from the cabinet, and the following day a new cabinet was formed under the leadership of Abu Hussain Sarkar, politician of UF constituent party Krishak Sramik Party (KSP). Before that, in reaction to Huq's statement that Huseyn Suhrawardy, leader of the All-Pakistan Awami League, means nothing in the UF, on 17 February 1955, a no-confidence motion was brought against Huq in the East Bengal Legislative Assembly by the UF constituent party East Pakistan Awami League (AL). However, a majority vote sided with Huq, resulting in the AL's departure from the UF.

== Fall ==
On 13 August 1956, AL politician Sheikh Mujibur Rahman moved a no-confidence motion against the UF-led cabinet during a session of the provincial assembly. However, in 14 August, A. K. Fazlul Huq, the governor of East Pakistan, announced the indefinite adjournment of the Assembly session, prompting the AL to launch a movement against the Governor. On 15 August, three members of the cabinet resigned. Amid intense protests, the governor considered convening a session in 26 August. As Hindu members withdrew their support over issues related to the constitution and the joint electorate system, the cabinet soon realized that its fall was inevitable; consequently, the cabinet members resigned in 30 August. Meanwhile, the AL reached understandings with various minority-based political parties on several demands, including the Five-Point Programme. In 4 September, protests erupted in Dhaka in response to the East Pakistan Rifles opening fire on an AL rally, killing four people and injuring several others. In this situation, Section 144 was imposed, and leaders of the KSP went into hiding. Under these circumstances, the governor invited the AL to form the cabinet. In 5 September, the AL formed a new cabinet in the province.

== Members ==
The cabinet consisted of the following ministers:

Cabinet
Portfolio	Minister	Took office	Left office	Party
Chief Minister’s Office	Abu Hussain Sarkar	6 June 1955	30 August 1956	KSP
Communications, Works and Irrigation, and Local Self-Government Department, and Public Health Engineering Department	Abdus Salam Khan	6 June 1955	30 August 1956	AL
Commerce, Labour and Industries Department	Syed Azizul Huq	6 June 1955	30 August 1956	KSP
Agriculture and Civil Supplies Department	Hashimuddin Ahmed	6 June 1955	30 August 1956	AL
Local Self-Government and Registration Department	Gyasuddin Ahmed Choudhury	7 September 1955	30 August 1956	KSP
Government Procurement Department	Latif Hussain	7 September 1955	30 August 1956	KSP
Food and Fisheries Department	Giasuddin Ahmed	7 September 1955	30 August 1956	KSP
Public Relations Department	Mahmudunnabi Chowdhury	7 September 1955	30 August 1956	KSP
Medical and Public Health Department	A. K. M. Zahirul Haq	7 September 1955	30 August 1956	AL
Co-operatives Department	Sarat Chandra Majumdar	7 September 1955	12 March 1956	PNC
Excise and Forest Department	Madhu Sudan Sarkar	7 September 1955	30 August 1956	PNC
Finance and Revenue Department	Prabhas Chandra Lahiri	February 1956	30 August 1956	UPP

== Former members ==
The list of former members of the cabinet is given below:

Cabinet
Portfolio	Minister	Took office	Left office
Finance and Revenue Department	Syed Mostagawsal Haque	7 September 1955	12 September 1955
Education Department	Ashrafuddin Ahmad Chowdhury	6 June 1955	15 August 1956
Judicial and Legislative Department	Nasiruddin Ahmad Choudhury	7 September 1955	15 August 1956
Finance and Revenue Department	Basanta Kumar Das	12 September 1955	February 1956
