= Third Huq ministry =

Third cabinet of East Pakistan

Third Ministry of A. K. Fazlul Huq
- 3rd Cabinet of East Bengal
- 1954–1955
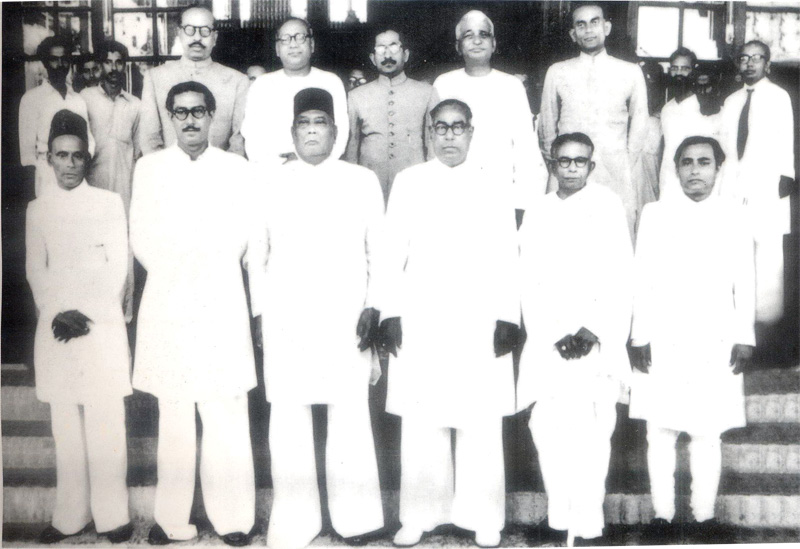
- Cabinet members in front of the Governor's House in Dacca on 15 May 1954
- Date formed: 3 April 1954
- Date dissolved: 5 June 1955

People and organisations
- Governor: Chaudhry Khaliquzzaman; Iskander Mirza
- Chief Minister: A. K. Fazlul Huq
- No. of ministers: 14
- Total no. of members: 14
- Member party: UF: KSP; AML; NIP
- Status in legislature: Minority 113 / 309 (37%)
- Opposition party: AL; GD
- Opposition leader: Ataur Rahman Khan

History
- Election: 1954
- Outgoing election: 1946
- Legislature term: 2nd East Pakistan Provincial Assembly
- Predecessor: Amin
- Successor: Sarkar I

Third Huq ministry was the third cabinet formed in the eastern province of Pakistan, East Bengal (later renamed East Pakistan). It was formed under the leadership of A. K. Fazlul Huq, leader of the Krishak Sramik Party (KSP), a constituent party of the victorious United Front (UF) following the 1954 East Bengal Legislative Assembly election. The cabinet lasted for about two months and was replaced nearly a year later by the First Abu Hussain Sarkar ministry.

== Background ==
In the 1954 East Bengal Legislative Assembly election, the United Front (UF), an alliance of four parties, won 228 out of 309 seats. On 25 March 1954, Chaudhry Khaliquzzaman, the governor of East Bengal, invited A. K. Fazlul Huq, leader of the Krishak Sramik Party (KSP), to submit a list of cabinet members on the behalf of UF, although he had not yet been formally elected as the leader of the alliance. After meeting the governor, Huq disclosed that it might take more than seven days to propose the names for his cabinet. In 2 April, he submitted the names of Syed Azizul Huq and Abu Hossain Sarkar as cabinet members to the governor and assured that he would propose more names later. In 3 April, Huq and his three politicians were sworn in at the Government House, Dacca as members of the new cabinet, marking the end of governor's rule. In the cabinet, Huq took charge of Finance, Home and Revenue; Ashrafuddin Ahmad Chowdhury of Civil Supplies and Communication; Abu Hossain Sarkar of Judiciary, Health and Local Self-Government; and Syed Azizul Huq of Education, Commerce, Labour and Industry. However, the new chief minister Huq stated that his cabinet was incomplete and responsibilities would be reassigned after full expansion. The cabinet formation drew mixed reactions from UF members, with many surprised by the absence of representatives from the member party All-Pakistan Awami Muslim League (later All-Pakistan Awami League, abbreviated as AL). After discussions with Huq in 8 April, AL leader Huseyn Shaheed Suhrawardy told reporters that the cabinet expansion issue was nearing resolution. Between 11 and 16 April, several rounds of talks were held between Suhrawardy and Huq on possible cabinet members. In 1 May, Huq announced that he would submit the names of new cabinet members, including two Hindus, to the governor in the 6th. In 13 May, more names were proposed, though none were Hindu; it was stated that two members from minority and four from Rajshahi Division would be proposed later. Based on Huq's submission, ten more ministers took oath in 15 May. On 20 May 1954, cabinet portfolios were redistributed.

== Fall ==
In April 30, during a speech in Calcutta, capital of the Indian state West Bengal, the chief minister made remarks about the similarities between the two Bengals, which sparked criticism in Pakistan. In response to the criticism, Huq claimed that the comments he made in his speech were misinterpreted. In May 15, a deadly clash between Bengali Muslims and non-Bengali Muhajir workers at Adamjee Jute Mills led to approximately 1,500 deaths. In May 24, an article in The New York Times reported that Huq had stated that if necessary, East Bengal would secede from Pakistan to become an independent state. However, the chief minister denied the report, stating it was fabricated and falsified, asserting instead that his government would continue to fight for East Bengal's autonomy. In May 30, citing the provincial cabinet’s failure to manage the emergency and to maintain public security, the governor-general Malik Ghulam Muhammad imposed governor’s rule in the province and dissolved the cabinet. Later, former provincial chief minister Huq was placed under house arrest. Around 1,600 UF activists were arrested on charges of anti-government activities, including 30 members of the provincial legislature. On 1 June 1954, Mohammad Ali Bogra, the prime minister of Pakistan, labeled Huq's alleged statements as seditious and warned that his call for East Bengal’s independence was effectively a desire to secede from Pakistan and become dependent on India, which would lead to the province's subjugation. On 23 July 1954, A. K. Fazlul Huq announced his permanent retirement from political career. In reaction to Huq's statement that Suhrawardy means nothing in the UF unlike him, on 17 February 1955, a no-confidence motion was brought against Huq in the East Bengal Legislative Assembly by the AL. However, a majority vote sided with Huq, resulting in the AL's departure from the UF. Following this, the AL's strength in the assembly decreased as some members joined the Nizam-e-Islam Party (NIP) and the KSP. Additionally, a faction of the AL opposed removing the word "Muslim" from the party name and formed a separate party called the Awami Muslim League (AML), which continued to support the UF. On 5 June 1955, governor's rule was lifted, and the cabinet was reinstated. Huq resigned from the cabinet, and the next day, a new cabinet was formed under the leadership of Abu Hossain Sarkar.

== Members ==
The cabinet was composed of the following ministers:

Portfolio	Minister	Took office	Left office	Party
Chief Minister's Office	A. K. Fazlul Huq	3 April 1954	29 May 1954	KSP
Civil Supplies Department	Ataur Rahman Khan	15 May 1954	29 May 1954	AL
Finance Department	Abu Hussain Sarkar	3 April 1954	29 May 1954	KSP
Law and Justice Department	Kafiluddin Chowdhury	15 May 1954	29 May 1954	KSP
Public Health Department	Abul Mansur Ahmad	15 May 1954	29 May 1954	AL
Education Department	Syed Azizul Huq	3 April 1954	29 May 1954	KSP
Department of Industries and Labor	Abdus Salam Khan	15 May 1954	29 May 1954	AL
Department of Rural Development and Cooperatives	Sheikh Mujibur Rahman	15 May 1954	29 May 1954	AL
Revenue and Land Reforms Department	Abdul Latif Biswas	15 May 1954	29 May 1954	KSP
Land Acquisition Department	Syed Muazzemuddin Hossain	15 May 1954	29 May 1954	AL
Department of Trade and Energy Development	Hashim Uddin Ahmed	15 May 1954	29 May 1954	AL
Department of Agriculture, Forest and Jute	Yusuf Ali Chowdhury	15 May 1954	29 May 1954	KSP
Medical and prison departments	Razzaqul Haider Chowdhury	15 May 1954	29 May 1954	KSP
Roads and Housing Department	Ashrafuddin Ahmad Chowdhury	3 April 1954	29 May 1954	NIP

== Controversy ==
At that time, a military agreement had been signed between Pakistan and the United States, and American interference in the affairs of East Bengal was gradually increasing. As a result, in such a situation, following a report published in The New York Times, the dissolution of the cabinet led the Bengali people to begin suspecting the United States.
