= Second Ataur ministry =

Seventh cabinet of East Pakistan

Second Ministry of Ataur Rahman Khan
- 7th Cabinet of East Pakistan
- 1958
- Date formed: 1 April 1958
- Date dissolved: 18 June 1958

People and organisations
- Governor: Muhammad Hamid Ali; Sultanuddin Ahmad
- Chief Minister: Ataur Rahman Khan
- No. of ministers: 10
- Total no. of members: 10
- Member party: AL; PNC; GD; UPP; Independent
- Status in legislature: Majority 195 / 309 (63%)
- Opposition party: KSP; NIP; SCF; UPP
- Opposition leader: Abu Hussain Sarkar

History
- Election: 1954
- Outgoing election: 1946
- Legislature term: 2nd East Pakistan Provincial Assembly
- Predecessor: Sarkar II
- Successor: Sarkar III

The Second Ataur ministry was the seventh cabinet formed in East Pakistan, the former eastern province of Pakistan. It was formed under the leadership of Ataur Rahman Khan, leader of the Awami League (AL), following the dissolution of the short-lived Second Abu Hussain Sarkar ministry. The ministry lasted approximately two and a half months before being succeeded by the equally short-lived Third Sarkar ministry.

== Background ==
On 31 March 1958, the provincial governor A. K. Fazlul Huq dismissed Chief Minister Ataur Rahman Khan, leader of the Awami League (AL), bringing about the dissolution of the First Ataur ministry. On the same day, the governor invited Abu Hussain Sarkar, leader of the Krishak Sramik Party (KSP), to form the Second Abu Hussain Sarkar ministry, and Sarkar was sworn in as chief minister. The central government thereupon dismissed the governor and appointed Muhammad Hamid Ali as acting governor of East Pakistan. On 1 April 1958, Ali invited Khan to form a new cabinet, and the Second Ataur ministry was sworn in. Portfolios were distributed among the ministers on 2 April 1958.

== Dissolution ==
On 18 June 1958, the cabinet fell following a vote of no confidence passed by opposition parties in the East Pakistan Provincial Assembly, including the KSP. The following day, acting governor Sultanuddin Ahmad invited Sarkar to form a new cabinet, which he accepted. The Third Sarkar ministry was accordingly sworn in on 20 June 1958.

== Members ==
The cabinet consisted of the following ministers:

Cabinet members
Portfolio	Minister	Took office	Left office	Party
Public Safety, Planning, Education, Relief and Rehabilitation Department	Ataur Rahman Khan	1 April 1958	18 June 1958	AL
Public Works, Communications, Flood Control and Forests Department	Kafiluddin Chowdhury	1 April 1958	18 June 1958	AL
Local Self-Government and Information Department	Mashiur Rahman	1 April 1958	18 June 1958	AL
Agriculture, Animal Husbandry and Veterinary Services Department	Khairat Hossain	1 April 1958	18 June 1958	AL
Cooperatives, Agricultural Credit and Marketing Department	Abdur Rahman Khan	1 April 1958	18 June 1958	AL
Justice, Law and Registration Department	Muhammad Mansur Ali	1 April 1958	18 June 1958	AL
Finance and Minority Affairs Department	Manoranjan Dhar	1 April 1958	18 June 1958	PNC
Medical and Public Health Department	Dhirendranath Datta	1 April 1958	18 June 1958	UPP
Excise and Salt Department	Sarat Chandra Majumdar	1 April 1958	18 June 1958	PNC
Forest and Food Department	Gour Chandra Bala	1 April 1958	18 June 1958	SCF
