= Second Abu Hussain Sarkar ministry =

Sixth cabinet of East Pakistan

Second Ministry of Abu Hussain Sarkar
- 6th Cabinet of East Pakistan
- 1958
- Date formed: 31 March 1958
- Date dissolved: 1 April 1958

People and organisations
- Governor: A. K. Fazlul Huq; Muhammad Hamid Ali
- Chief Minister: Abu Hussain Sarkar
- No. of ministers: 2
- Ministers removed: 0
- Total no. of members: 2
- Member party: KSP
- Status in legislature: Minority 114 / 307 (37%)
- Opposition party: AL; GD; PNC
- Opposition leader: Ataur Rahman Khan

History
- Election: 1954
- Outgoing election: 1946
- Legislature term: 2nd East Pakistan Provincial Assembly
- Predecessor: Ataur I
- Successor: Ataur II

The Second Sarkar ministry was the sixth cabinet formed in East Pakistan, the former eastern province of Pakistan. It was formed following the dismissal of the First Ataur ministry, under the leadership of Abu Hussain Sarkar of the Krishak Sramik Party (KSP). The ministry lasted only a matter of hours before being succeeded by the Second Ataur ministry.

== Background and dissolution ==
On 31 March 1958, the provincial governor A. K. Fazlul Huq instructed Ataur Rahman Khan, the chief minister and leader of the Awami League (AL), to resign. Khan refused, and the governor subsequently dismissed him, bringing about the dissolution of his cabinet. On the same day, the governor invited Abu Hussain Sarkar, leader of the Krishak Sramik Party (KSP), to form a new cabinet, and Sarkar was sworn in as chief minister that day. The central government of Feroz Khan Noon thereupon dismissed the governor and appointed Muhammad Hamid Ali as acting governor. The new governor invited Khan to form a cabinet, and the Second Ataur ministry was accordingly formed on 1 April 1958.

== Members ==
Cabinet members
Portfolio	Minister	Took office	Left office	Party	Ref
Chief Minister's Office	Abu Hussain Sarkar	31 March 1958	1 April 1958	KSP	
	Abdul Hamid	31 March 1958	1 April 1958	KSP	
