= Third Abu Hussain Sarkar ministry =

Eighth cabinet of East Pakistan

Third Ministry of Abu Hussain Sarkar
- 8th Cabinet of East Pakistan
- 1958
- Date formed: 20 June 1958
- Date dissolved: 23 June 1958

People and organisations
- Governor: Sultanuddin Ahmad
- Chief Minister: Abu Hussain Sarkar
- No. of ministers: 3
- Total no. of members: 3
- Member party: KSP; UPP
- Status in legislature: Minority 138 / 307 (45%)
- Opposition party: AL; GD; PNC
- Opposition leader: Ataur Rahman Khan

History
- Election: 1954
- Outgoing election: 1946
- Legislature term: 2nd East Pakistan Provincial Assembly
- Predecessor: Ataur II
- Successor: Ataur III

The Third Sarkar ministry was the eighth cabinet formed in East Pakistan, Pakistan's eastern province. It was formed under the leadership of Abu Hussain Sarkar of the Krishak Sramik Party following the fall of the Second Ataur ministry, and it lasted for three days, after which it was replaced by the Third Ataur ministry.

== Background ==
On 18 June 1958, the Second Ataur ministry led by the All-Pakistan Awami League (AL) fell as a result of a no-confidence vote brought by the opposition parties of the East Pakistan Legislative Assembly, including the Krishak Sramik Party (KSP). In the vote, the total support for the ruling party and its supporting factions was 126, while the opposition parties received a total of 138 votes. The National Awami Party (NAP) abstained from participating in the no-confidence vote. The following day, the provincial governor Sultanuddin Ahmad proposed KSP leader Abu Hussain Sarkar to form a new cabinet, and he accepted the proposal. As a result, on 20 June, a new three-member cabinet was sworn in under the leadership of Sarkar. It was later intended, upon further discussion, that the number of cabinet members would be increased.

== Fall and aftermath ==
On the day the cabinet was formed, an agreement was signed between Mahmud Ali, general-secretary of the East Pakistan NAP, and Sheikh Mujibur Rahman, general-secretary of the East Pakistan AL, regarding parliamentary solidarity on the NAP's five-point programme. Meanwhile, a no-confidence motion was brought against the new cabinet in the legislature. On 21 June, after the arrival of the central NAP president Abdul Hamid Khan Bhashani, in Dhaka, the provincial capital became politically turbulent. In the city, Bhashani held discussions with top leaders including Ataur Rahman Khan of the East Pakistan AL and Abu Hussain Sarkar of the East Pakistan KSP. The date of 23 June was fixed for discussion of the no-confidence motion. On this occasion, both the government and the opposition began active efforts to secure support, and they also contacted Bhashani. Eventually, with the support of the NAP, the cabinet was defeated by 14 votes, leading to its fall. However, according to the provincial governor's report, the central cabinet agreed to imposed governor's rule in East Pakistan and it was imposed until 24 August. Thereafter, on 25 August, the Third Ataur ministry assumed responsibility for the province.

== Members ==
The cabinet consisted of the following ministers:

Cabinet
Portfolio	Minister	Took office	Left office	Party
Office of the Chief Minister	Abu Hussain Sarkar	20 June 1958	23 June 1958	KSP
	Abdul Hamid	20 June 1958	23 June 1958	KSP
Jail and Finance Department	Prabhas Chandra Lahiri	20 June 1958	23 June 1958	UPP
