= List of cabinets of East Pakistan =

The following is a list of the cabinets of East Pakistan (now People's Republic of Bangladesh), which was a province of the Islamic Republic of Pakistan from 1947 to 1971:

== List ==
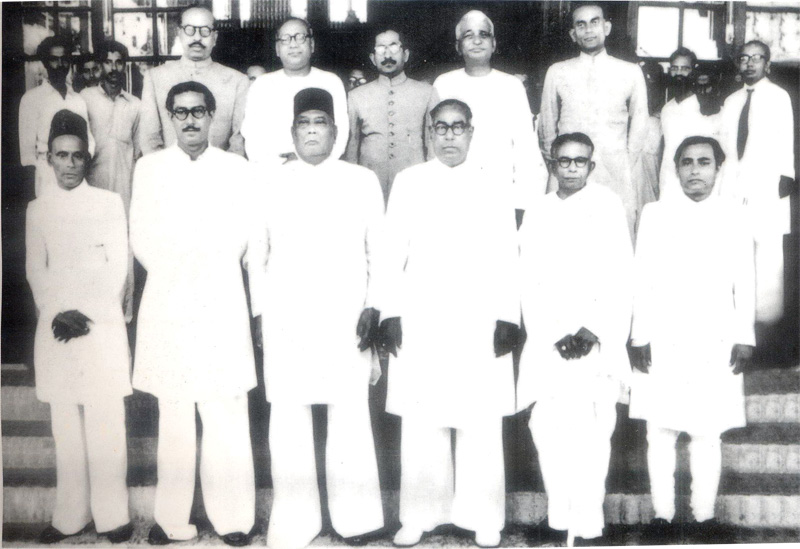
Members of the Third Huq ministry

| No. | Name | Formation | Election | Party | System | Source |
|---|---|---|---|---|---|---|
| 1 | Nazimuddin II | 15 August 1947 | 1946 | PML | Parliamentary | |
| 2 | Amin | 15 September 1948 | - | PML | Parliamentary | |
| 3 | Huq III | 3 April 1954 | 1954 | UF | Parliamentary | |
| 4 | Sarkar I | 6 June 1955 | - | UF | Parliamentary | |
| 5 | Ataur I | 5 September 1956 | - | AL | Parliamentary | |
| 6 | Sarkar II | 31 March 1958 | - | KSP | Parliamentary | |
| 7 | Ataur II | 1 April 1958 | - | AL | Parliamentary | |
| 8 | Sarkar III | 20 June 1958 | - | KSP | Parliamentary | |
| 9 | Ataur III | 25 August 1958 | - | AL | Parliamentary | |
| 10 | Faruque | 29 May 1962 | - | Independent | Presidential | |
| 11 | Monem I | 29 October 1962 | 1962 | PML(C) | Presidential | |
| 12 | Monem II | 29 March 1965 | 1965 | PML(C) | Presidential | |
| 13 | Malik | 17 September 1971 | - | Coalition | Presidential | |

== See also ==
- List of cabinets of Bengal
- List of Bangladeshi cabinets
