= Mir Hasem Ali =

Bangladeshi politician

- মীর হাসেম আলী

Personal details
- Party: United Front
- Occupation: Politician, lawyer

Mir Hasem Ali was a Pakistani politician who was elected as MLA of East Bengal Legislative Assembly in 1954.
