= Serajuddin Ahmad =

Bengali politician

Member of the Bengal Legislative Assembly
- In office 1946–1947
- Preceded by: Alfazuddin Ahmed
- Constituency: Midnapore

Personal details
- Born: Krishnapur, Midnapore district, Bengal Presidency

Serajuddin Ahmad was a Bengali politician.

== Early life and education ==
Ahmad was born into a Bengali Muslim family in the village of Krishnapur in the Midnapore district of the Bengal Presidency.

== Career ==
Ahmad contested in the 1946 Bengal Legislative Assembly election and won a seat at the Bengal Legislative Assembly.
