= Bhabesh Chandra Nandi =

Pakistani politician

Maudi Bhakesh Chand

Member of the National Assembly of Pakistan
- In office 1947–1954

Bhabesh Chandra Nandi (Bengali: ভবেশচন্দ্র নন্দি, Urdu: بھویش چندر نندی) was a representative of East Pakistan in the Constituent Assembly of Pakistan.

In 1950, Nandi was elected to the East Bengal Legislative Assembly on a Pakistan National Congress ticket from the East Dacca constituency, after the incumbent MLA Ganendra Chandra Bhattacharjee (from Congress) migrated to India. He was a member (Note: The Cabinet Mission Plan had reserved one seat in the Constitution Assembly per million people of a province. These seats were distributed among Muslims, Sikhs, and General (Hindus and others) category in proportion to their share of population in the province and were to be elected by legislators of the particular community. Bengal Province was allotted with sixty seats, of which twenty seven were reserved for General category and rest for Muslims.) of the Constituent Assembly of Pakistan.
