= Bakarganj =

Bakarganj may refer to:

- Bakerganj Upazila, Bangladesh
- Backergunge District, a former district of British Bengal, East Pakistan and Bangladesh
