= Naimuddin Ahmed =

Naimuddin Ahmed (died: 30 July 2008) was a former judge of the Supreme Court of Bangladesh's High Court Division, a former Election Commissioner, and a member of the Law Commission.

== Biography ==
Naimuddin Ahmed served as a judge of the High Court Division of the Supreme Court of Bangladesh. He was a former Election Commissioner of the Bangladesh Election Commission and a member of the Law Commission.

He also served as Vice Chairman of the Bangladesh Legal Aid and Services Trust.

He died at Square Hospital in the capital on 30 July 2008. He was buried at Banani graveyard in the capital.
