= Basanta Kumar Das (Pakistani politician) =

Pakistani politician

Babu Basanta Kumar Das

Federal Minister of Pakistan
- In office 7 February 1958 – 7 October 1958
- Prime Minister: Feroz Khan Noon
- Department: Education and Labor
- Preceded by: I. I. Chundrigar; Zahiruddin
- Succeeded by: Habibur Rahman; Wajid Ali Khan Burki

Provincial Minister of East Pakistan
- In office 12 September 1955 – 15 August 1956
- Chief Minister: Abu Hussain Sarkar
- Department: Finance and Revenue
- Preceded by: Abdul Latif Biswas; Abu Hussain Sarkar
- Succeeded by: Prabhas Chandra Lahiri

Provincial Minister of Assam
- In office 11 March 1946 – 17 August 1947
- Prime Minister: Gopinath Bordoloi
- Department: Home, Judicial, Legislative, Registration and General

Speaker of the Assam Legislative Assembly
- In office 7 April 1937 – 11 March 1946
- Leader: Muhammed Saadulah; Gopinath Bordoloi
- Preceded by: position established
- Succeeded by: Debeswar Sarmah

Personal details
- Born: 2 November 1883 Sylhet District, North-East Frontier Province, British India
- Died: 19 January 1965 (aged 81) South Calcutta, West Bengal, India
- Party: PNC (1948–1958)
- Other political affiliations: INC (1921–1947); SP (1923–1935)
- Education: Ripon Law College
- Occupation: Lawyer

Basanta Kumar Das (Bengali: বসন্ত কুমার দাস; Urdu: بسنت کُمار داس; 1883–1965) was a Pakistani lawyer and politician of the Pakistan National Congress who was a federal minister and a member of the Constituent Assembly of Pakistan from East Pakistan.

== Early life ==
Das, who came from a Sylheti family, was born on 2 November 1883 in Negal, Renga Pargana, Sylhet District, North-East Frontier Province, British India (present-day Dakshin Surma Upazila, Sylhet District, Bangladesh). He received his education from Sylhet Government College, Bangabasi College, Vidyasagar College and Ripon Law College. He started his political career by joining the 22nd session of the Indian National Congress (INC) in 1906. After acquiring his law degree, he joined the Sylhet District Bar in 1910 and got a job as munsif after five years. However, in 1917, Das left his job and became leader of the district bar.

== Political career ==
In 1921 he joined the non-cooperation movement and fought a legal battle on behalf of the movement's activists. In the 1930s, his efforts as Assam's MLC resulted in the Sylhet–Shillong highway and a bridge on the Umngot River. As a member of the Central Legislative Assembly, the lower house of the Imperial Legislative Council, Das proposed to change the name of Assam Province, formerly North-East Frontier Province, as according to him Assamese were not majority of the province. In 1932, he was imprisoned for his involvement in the civil disobedience movement and was released in 1934. In the 1937 Indian provincial elections, he was elected and became the speaker of the Assam Legislative Assembly. After the 1946 Indian provincial elections, he became minister for the home department of Assam Province. In the 1946 Indian Constituent Assembly election, he was elected as an INC politician from Assam Province. In April 1947, Muhammad Saleh Akbar Hydari, governor of Assam, proposed to let the immigrants settle on the north bank of the Brahmaputra River to resolve immigrants issues, which Das opposed. During the 1947 Sylhet referendum, Das advocated for vote for joining Sylhet District to the dominion of India. However, the referendum's turnout was in favour of joining the dominion of Pakistan. On 2 January 1948, a delegation led by Das and composed of members from several organizations submitted a memorandum of complaints to Vallabhbhai Patel, India's deputy prime minister, regarding discrimination against Bengalis in the newly formed Indian state of Assam. After the partition of India in 1947, Das immigrated to East Bengal (later renamed East Pakistan), part of the newly founded Pakistan, from Assam, India. As a leader of the Pakistan National Congress (PNC), he became leader of the opposition of the East Pakistan Provincial Assembly. In 1955, he became finance minister of East Pakistan as a member of the First Abu Hussain Sarkar ministry. In the same year, he was elected and became a member of the 2nd National Assembly of Pakistan. In 1958, until a military coup happened, he was education and labor minister of Pakistan as a member of the Feroze Khan administration.

== Later life, death and legacy ==
In 1959, restrictions on political activities were imposed on him according to the Election Bodies Disqualification Order (EBDO) by the provincial tribunal of East Pakistan. After that, he retired from politics. In 1960, Das moved to India for medical treatment. He died on 19 January 1965 at his son's house near Deshapriya Park, South Calcutta, India. His wife, social worker Kusum Kumari, was the founder of the Sylhet Women's Association. After Das's death, his residence in Chalibandar, Sylhet, was confiscated under the Enemy Property Act, 1965. In 1983, a school was established in his residence.
