= Dhananjoy Roy =

Bengali politician

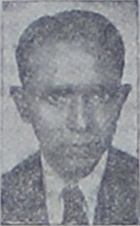
Dhananjoy Roy

Dhananjoy Roy was a Member of the 1st National Assembly of Pakistan as a representative of East Pakistan.

== Career ==
Roy was a Member of the Constituent Assembly of Pakistan. He was a prominent leader of the Scheduled Castes.
