= Dhirendranath Datta =

Pakistani politician

Dhirendran
- ধীরেন্দ্রনাথ দত্ত دھریندر ناتھ دتا

Health and Social Welfare Minister of East Pakistan
- In office 19 September 1956 – 7 October 1958

2nd Leader of the Opposition of Pakistan
- In office 7 May 1948 – 7 July 1955
- Leader: Liaquat Ali Khan; Khawaja Nazimuddin; Mohammad Ali Bogra
- Preceded by: Kiran Shankar Roy
- Succeeded by: Huseyn Shaheed Suhrawardy

Leader of the Opposition of East Bengal
- In office 15 March 1948 – 7 May 1948
- Leader: Khwaja Nazimuddin
- Preceded by: position created
- Succeeded by: Basanta Kumar Das

Personal details
- Born: 2 November 1886 Brahmanbaria, Bengal, British India
- Citizenship: British India (1886-1947); Pakistan (1947-1971); Bangladesh (1971)
- Party: Pakistan National Congress
- Occupation: Lawyer; politician

Dhirendranath Datta (2 November 1886 – disappeared 29 March 1971) was a Bengali lawyer and politician from East Bengal who was a member of the 1st Constituent Assembly of Pakistan. He is best known for proposing Bengali for the national language of Pakistan in the Assembly. He was also active in the politics of undivided Bengal in pre-partition India.

== Early life ==
Datta was born in an aristocratic Kayastha family on 2 November 1886 in Ramrail, in Brahmanbaria District, Bengal Province (in today's Bangladesh). His father Jagabandhu Datta was a mukhtiyer (lower ranked pleader) who introduced Dhirendranath to the legal profession from an early age. Dhirendranath completed matriculation from Comilla Zilla School. He graduated from Ripon College in 1908. Later he obtained a law degree from Calcutta University.

== Early career ==
Datta began his career as a school teacher after passing intermediate, he eventually became assistant headmaster of the Bangora High school in Comilla. After obtaining law degree, he started law practice as an advocate. He joined the Comilla District Bar Association in 1911. Quite early in his legal career, he established himself as a successful lawyer in the Comilla district. He practiced law earnestly and uninterruptedly from 1911 to 1920. Dhirendranath's reputation as a lawyer was akin to legend due to the service he provided for the poor. He continued to practice until he was advised to give up his profession in favor of politics by his political comrade Chittaranjan Das. He was very active in the local community and was a leader of the relief effort following devastating floods in 1915. He formed the Mukti Sangha, a welfare organization, after becoming inspired by Mahatma Gandhi. Datta's relief work continued up to the Bengal Famine of 1943.

== Political activism ==
Along with many politically active Bengalis of his time, Datta took a firm stand following the Bengal Partition of 1905. He chose to vehemently oppose partition, working closely with other anti-partition activists such as Surendranath Banerjee and Rabindranath Tagore. He took part in the Non-cooperation movement in 1921. He was imprisoned multiple times, including in 1932 for 13 months.

Datta joined the Indian National Congress and was elected to the Bengal Legislative Assembly in 1937. He was imprisoned for 9 months for his participation in the Quit India movement of 1942. He was reelected to the Bengal Legislative Assembly in 1946.

Datta firmly opposed the creation of Pakistan and partition of India on religious lines; but when it became clear that partition of Bengal was inevitable and that his home district of Comilla would be in the new Muslim majority state, he opted to remain in East Bengal (unlike many other Hindu leaders), and as a result, was invited to be part of the constitutional committee to draft the legislative framework of the new country before the actual independence of Pakistan.

=== The Pakistan era ===
Datta continued to represent his constituency as a Hindu member of the renamed Pakistan National Congress (seats were allocated by a quota according to religion). On 23 February 1948 in the Pakistan Constituent Assembly in Karachi, he made a speech calling for Bengali to be made one of the official languages of Pakistan, in what was to become the action he will be most remembered for by his compatriots.

In 1954, he moved an adjournment motion against the declaration of Governor's Rule in East Pakistan, and was seen as the de facto face of protest and democracy.

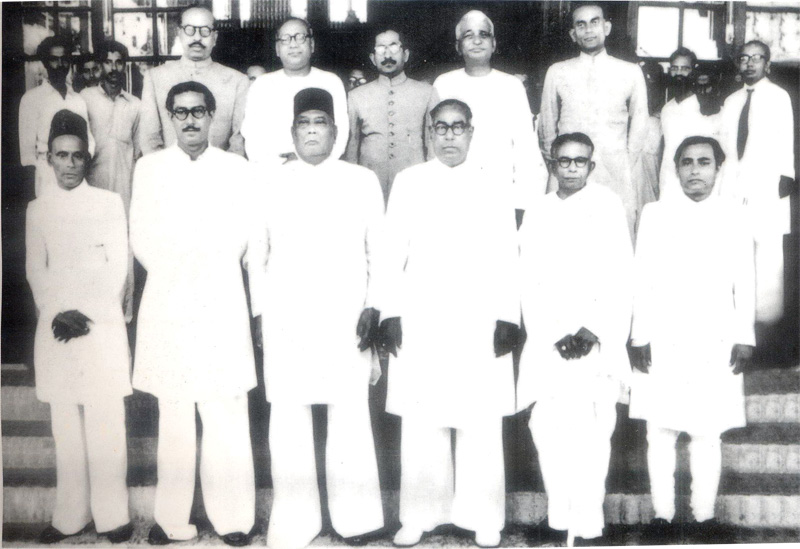
Datta at the 1954 cabinet standing second from right

He served as the Minister of Health and Social Welfare (East Pakistan) in Ataur Rahman Khan's cabinet (1956). Because of his alleged links to the emerging underground Bengali Nationalist movement, supposed members of which included Sheikh Mujibur Rahman, he was barred from participation in national election through the imposition of EBDO (Elective Bodies Disqualification Order). After this, he refrained from active politics but kept on supporting the rising nationalist movement from behind.

== Assassination by the Pakistan Army ==
Due to Datta's continued defiance of state discrimination and authoritarianism in Pakistan, at the onset of the Bangladesh Liberation War, three days after the arrest of Sheikh Mujibur Rahman, Datta was arrested at his house in Comilla on 29 March 1971, and taken with his son, Dilip Kumar Datta, to Moynamoti Cantonment and tortured to death. For this reason, he is referred to as "Shaheed buddhijibi" (martyred intellectual) as a sign of respect.

== Personal life ==
Datta had 2 sons, Sajib and Dilip Kumar Datta. His son Sajib was a journalist and married Pratiti Devi, twin sister of Ritwik Ghatak. Rahul Dutta. His granddaughter and Sajib's sister, Aroma Dutta, was a member of parliament from the Awami League.

On 7 November 2026, National Citizen Party leaders removed a signboard identifying Aroma Dutta, as the property's lawful heir of Dhirendranath Datta's property in Comilla, arguing that the historic house should be preserved by the state as a memorial museum. Dutta condemned the action and said she would inform the authorities. She called the National Citizen Party leaders land grabbers. Dutta issued a legal notice challenging the Department of Archaeology's order to inspect her family's ancestral property in Cumilla for possible recognition as an antiquity.

== See also ==
- Shaheed Dhirendranath Datta Stadium
