= Pakistan National Congress =

Political party in East Pakistan and Bangladesh

- Abbreviation: PNC
- Leader: Kiran Shankar Roy (1947–1948); Sris Chandra Chattopadhyaya (1948–1954); Manoranjan Dhar (1971)
- Founded: 1947 (79 years ago)
- Dissolved: 1975 (51 years ago)
- Split from: Indian National Congress
- Succeeded by: Bangladesh National Congress (1971–1975)
- Ideology: Gandhian socialism Secularism; Minority interests
- Political position: Centre-left
- Colours: Sky blue
- 1st Constituent Assembly of Pakistan: 11 / 69
- East Bengal Legislative Assembly (1954): 28 / 309

Election symbol
- Pitcher

The Pakistan National Congress was a Pakistani and later short-lived Bangladeshi political party that primarily represented Hindus and comprised members formerly associated with the Indian National Congress at the time of Partition. The party championed secularism in the Muslim-dominated state, and its electoral and organisational strength was mainly based in East Bengal, later East Pakistan, now Bangladesh.

The PNC played the role of the principal opposition in the first Constituent Assembly of Pakistan; party leader Kiran Shankar Roy served as its first Leader of the Opposition before departing for West Bengal, India, in 1948. He was succeeded by Sris Chandra Chattopadhyaya, who remains the longest-serving Leader of the Opposition in the national legislature, stepping down after the assembly was dissolved in 1954.

The PNC sought a secular Constitution, joint electorates, and Bengali as the national language of Pakistan. It won 28 seats in the 1954 East Bengal Legislative Assembly election, forming a coalition government with the United Front; the ministry was sacked and replaced by governor's rule under Iskander Mirza three weeks later.

The party was banned after martial law was imposed by Mirza and army chief Ayub Khan in 1958, resurfaced as the Bangladesh National Congress in 1971, and was dissolved permanently by Prime Minister Sheikh Mujibur Rahman in 1975, following the Fourth Amendment to Bangladesh's Constitution outlawing all political parties except Mujib's BAKSAL.

== History ==
The Pakistan National Congress traces its roots to the Indian National Congress, which was the largest national political party in India. The Indian National Congress, led by Mahatma Gandhi, Vallabhbhai Patel and Jawaharlal Nehru championed secularism, composite nationalism, religious tolerance and opposed the Pakistan movement led by the Muslim League. However, ensuing communal conflict led to the partition of India and the creation of Pakistan from Muslim-majority provinces. The religious violence and mass migration as a result of partition significantly reduced the Hindu, Sikh and non-Muslim population of Pakistan. The leaders and activists of the Indian National Congress who continued to live in Pakistan joined with the representatives of Hindu, Sikh, Buddhist and Christian communities to form a new political party, the Pakistan National Congress. Although most of them had opposed the partition of India, the members of the new party accepted the state of Pakistan and did not maintain any organisational links with the Indian National Congress.

It stood for secularism, equality of all religions and citizens and protection of religious and ethnic minorities. The party sought peaceful and friendly relations between Pakistan and India. The party was one of many that opposed the suppression of democracy and civil rights by successive military regimes. The Pakistan National Congress also stood against the growth of Islamic fundamentalism in Pakistani society, politics and government. The party also supported the Bengali language movement in East Bengal.

National Congress was the only party at the opposition side of the house during the movement. In both Legislative Assembly and in Constituent Assembly they exposed of the logical position of the language demand. In doing so some of the members were called Indian agents and were harassed by the government. Some leaders were also arrested and one of them was killed inside the jail.

While partition riots and mass migration had significantly reduced the Hindu and Sikh population in West Pakistan, Hindus still constituted twenty percent of the population of East Bengal (also East Pakistan). Consequently, the PNC's base and organisation were concentrated in that province of Pakistan. In the 1954 elections held for the East Bengal Legislative Assembly, the Pakistan National Congress won 28 seats. Basanta Kumar Das, Bhupendra Kumar Datta, Konteswar Barman and Peter Paul Gomez were the assembly members in 1955 from the party that time.

=== Bangladesh and dissolution ===
After the Bangladeshi War of Independence, the party briefly survived as the Bangladesh National Congress. The party stood one candidate, Sree Peter Paul Gomez in the 1973 election for Dacca-25, but did not win the seat. The party was dissolved in 1975 after the formation of the Bangladesh Krishak Sramik Awami League as the sole political party of Bangladesh. It is unknown how long the party survived in West Pakistan.

== Members in the 1st Constituent Assembly ==
=== East Bengal ===
1. Bhupendra Kumar Datta
2. Kiran Shankar Roy
3. Prem Hari Barma
4. Raj Kumar Chakraverty
5. Sris Chandra Chattopadhyaya
6. Akshay Kumar Das
7. Dhirendra Nath Datta
8. Jnanendra Chandra Majumdar
9. Birat Chandra Mandal
10. Sri Dhananjoy M.A. B.L. Roy
11. Maudi Bhakesh Chanda
12. Harendra Kumar Sur
13. Kawivi Kerwar Datta

=== West Punjab ===
1. Ganga Saran
2. Rai Bahadur Lala

== See also ==
- Indian Union Muslim League
- Bangladesh Minority Janata Party

== Sources ==
- Umar, Badruddin (1979). Purbo-Banglar Bhasha Andolon O Totkalin Rajniti পূর্ব বাংলার ভাষা আন্দোলন ও তৎকালীন রজনীতি (in Bengali). Dhaka: Agamee Prakashani.
