= Ataur Rahman Khan =

Prime Minister of Bangladesh from 1984 to 1985

- আতাউর রহমান খান
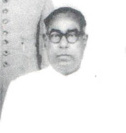
- Khan in 1954

5th Prime Minister of Bangladesh
- In office 30 March 1984 – 1 January 1985
- President: Hussain Muhammad Ershad
- Preceded by: Shah Azizur Rahman
- Succeeded by: Mizanur Rahman Chowdhury

5th Chief Minister of East Pakistan
- In office 1 September 1956 – 13 April 1958
- President: Iskander Ali Mirza
- Prime Minister: Chaudhry Muhammad Ali; Huseyn Shaheed Suhrawardy; I. I. Chundrigar; Feroz Khan Noon
- Governor: A. K. Fazlul Huq
- Preceded by: Abu Hussain Sarkar
- Succeeded by: Position abolished

Leader of the Opposition of East Pakistan
- In office 5 August 1955 – 1 September 1956
- Leader: Abu Hussain Sarkar
- Preceded by: Basanta Kumar Das
- Succeeded by: Abu Hussain Sarkar

Member of Parliament
- In office 18 February 1979 – 24 March 1982
- Preceded by: Moyez Uddin
- Succeeded by: Position Abolished
- Constituency: Dhaka-21
- In office 7 March 1973 – 6 November 1975
- Preceded by: Position Established
- Succeeded by: Mohammad Habibullah
- Constituency: Dhaka-19

Personal details
- Born: 6 March 1905 Dhamrai, Bengal, British India
- Died: 7 December 1991 (aged 86) Dhaka, Bangladesh
- Party: Jatiya League (1968–1984); Jatiya Party (1984–1991)
- Other political affiliations: All-India Muslim League (before 1947); Awami League (1949–1968) Muslim League (1947-1949)
- Children: Ziaur Rahman Khan
- Education: University of Dhaka (BA)

Ataur Rahman Khan (Bengali: আতাউর রহমান খান; 6 March 1905 – 7 December 1991) was a Bangladeshi lawyer, politician and writer, who served as the chief minister of East Pakistan from 1 September 1956 to 13 April 1958, and as the prime minister of Bangladesh from 30 March 1984 to 1 January 1985.

== Early life ==
Ataur Rahman Khan was born on 1 July 1905 at Balia village, Dhamrai Thana, Dhaka district, East Bengal, British India. He graduated from Pogose School in Dhaka in 1924. He then graduated from Jagannath College in 1927. He obtained a bachelor's degree in economics and law from the University of Dhaka in 1930 and 1936 respectively.

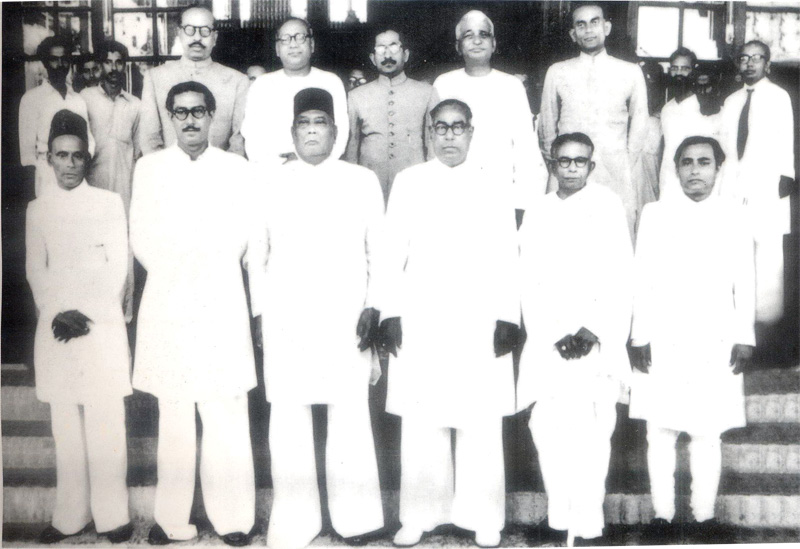
Cabinet of East Bengal, 1954. Front row (from left): Khairat Hossain, Sheikh Mujibur Rahman, Chief Minister A. K. Fazlul Huq, Ataur Rahman Khan, Basanta Kumar Das, Mohammmed Ali. Back row (from left): Abdur Rahman Khan, Manoranjan Dhar, Mashiur Rahman, Dhirendranath Datta, Captain Mansur Ali.

== Career ==
Khan joined the Dhaka District Bar in 1937. He then joined the judicial branch of the Civil Service as a munsiff in 1942 where he worked until 1944. He joined the Krishak Praja Samiti and served as the secretary of the Dhaka District unit. In 1944, he joined the All India Muslim League. He served as the vice president of the Manikganj unit of the Muslim League. Khan joined the creation of the Awami Muslim League in 1949 and served as its vice-president until 1964. He was a leader of the Sarbadaliya Chhatra Sangram Parishad, which played the leading role in the Bengali language movement in 1952 for making the Bengali language a state language of Pakistan.

In 1954, Khan was the joint convenor of the United Front which won the provincial election. He himself was elected to the East Bengal Legislative Assembly and made the Ministry of Civil Supplies in the United Front government under A. K. Fazlul Huq. In 1955, He was elected to the Constituent Assembly of Pakistan. From 1955 to 1956, he was the leader of the opposition in the East Pakistan Provincial Assembly.

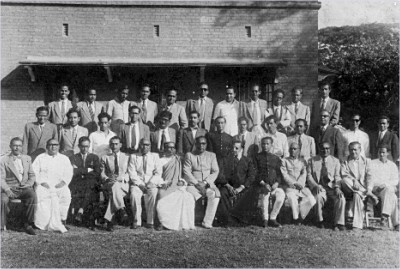
H S Suhrawardy, Prime Minister of Pakistan visited the Press Club in 1958. Provincial Chief Minister Ataur Rahman Khan along with his cabinet colleagues and Tofazzal Hossain Manik Miah, Editor of The Daily Ittefaq and members of the Press Club are also seen in the photo.

After Hussain Shaheed Suhrawardy became Prime Minister of Pakistan, he got Abu Hossain Sarkar to resign as Chief Minister of East Pakistan so that Khan could replace him. Khan formed the government of East Pakistan on 1 September 1956 and became the Chief Minister of East Pakistan. He found himself in a power struggle with the Awami League General Secretary, Sheikh Mujibur Rahman. Sheikh Mujib was more popular with Awami League party workers than Khan. His government lasted until March 1958. On 31 March 1958, Governor A. K. Fazlul Huq removed Khan from the post of Chief Minister and appointed Abu Hossain Sarkar. Huq was removed from the post of governor by President Iskander Mirza and Khan was back as the Chief Minister of East Pakistan in 12 hours. President's rule was declared and two months later, Khan was again the Chief Minister. There was a brawl in the East Bengal Legislative Assembly in which Deputy Speaker Shahed Ali Patwary was killed and General Ayub Khan took over power in Pakistan when martial law was declared. He had been removed and restored to the post of Chief Minister three times in one year. He and Suhrawardy's central and provincial government was criticised by Abdul Hamid Khan Bhashani, leader of the leftist fraction of Awami League, while supported by Sheikh Mujibur Rahman, the leader of the nationalist fraction of Awami League. He worked with Hussain Shaheed Suhrawardy under the National Democratic Front to restore democracy to Pakistan. Khan had succeeded Hussain Shaheed Suhrawardy as President of Awami League in 1963 further deteriorating relationship with Sheikh Mujibur Rahman. In 1969, he was elected president of Dhaka High Court Bar Association. In 1969, he created a new political party called Jatiya League over differences with Sheikh Mujibur Rahman.

In 1970, Khan contested the Pakistani general election for the national assembly but lost. During the Bangladesh Liberation War, Khan was detained for six months by Pakistan Army and released in September. After the independence of Bangladesh, he was elected to the parliament of Bangladesh in 1973. In 1975, he joined the Sheikh Mujibur Rahman-led Bangladesh Krishak Sramik Awami League government. He revived his Jatiya League after the government was removed from power in a series of coups.

Khan was elected to parliament in 1979. He campaigned against the rule of General Hussain Mohammad Ershad, before joining him. He was made the Prime Minister in 1984, which he held until 1 January 1985.

== Pakistan Football Federation ==
Khan served as president of the Pakistan Football Federation between 1958 and 1960.

== Bibliography ==
- Ojarotir Dui Bochhor (1963)
- Shoiracharer Dosh Bochhor (1969)
- Prodhan-Montritter Noi Maash (1987)
- Oboruddhor Noi Maash (1990).

== Death ==
Khan died in Dhaka on 7 December 1991 at the age of 86 and is buried inside parliament grounds. His son, Ziaur Rahman Khan (died 2021), was a member of parliament from Bangladesh Nationalist Party. His son and grandson were denied access to the grave without a security pass by the police guarding the parliament. The Bangladesh Nationalist Party organizes remembrance events on his death anniversary.

Political offices
Preceded by Shah Azizur Rahman	Prime Minister of Bangladesh; 1984–1986	Succeeded by Mizanur Rahman Chowdhury
Diplomatic posts
Preceded by New Office	Chairperson of SAARC; 1985	Succeeded by Rajiv Gandhi
