= 1946 Bengal Legislative Assembly election =

- 1946

All 250 seats in the Bengal Legislative Assembly 126 seats needed for a majority
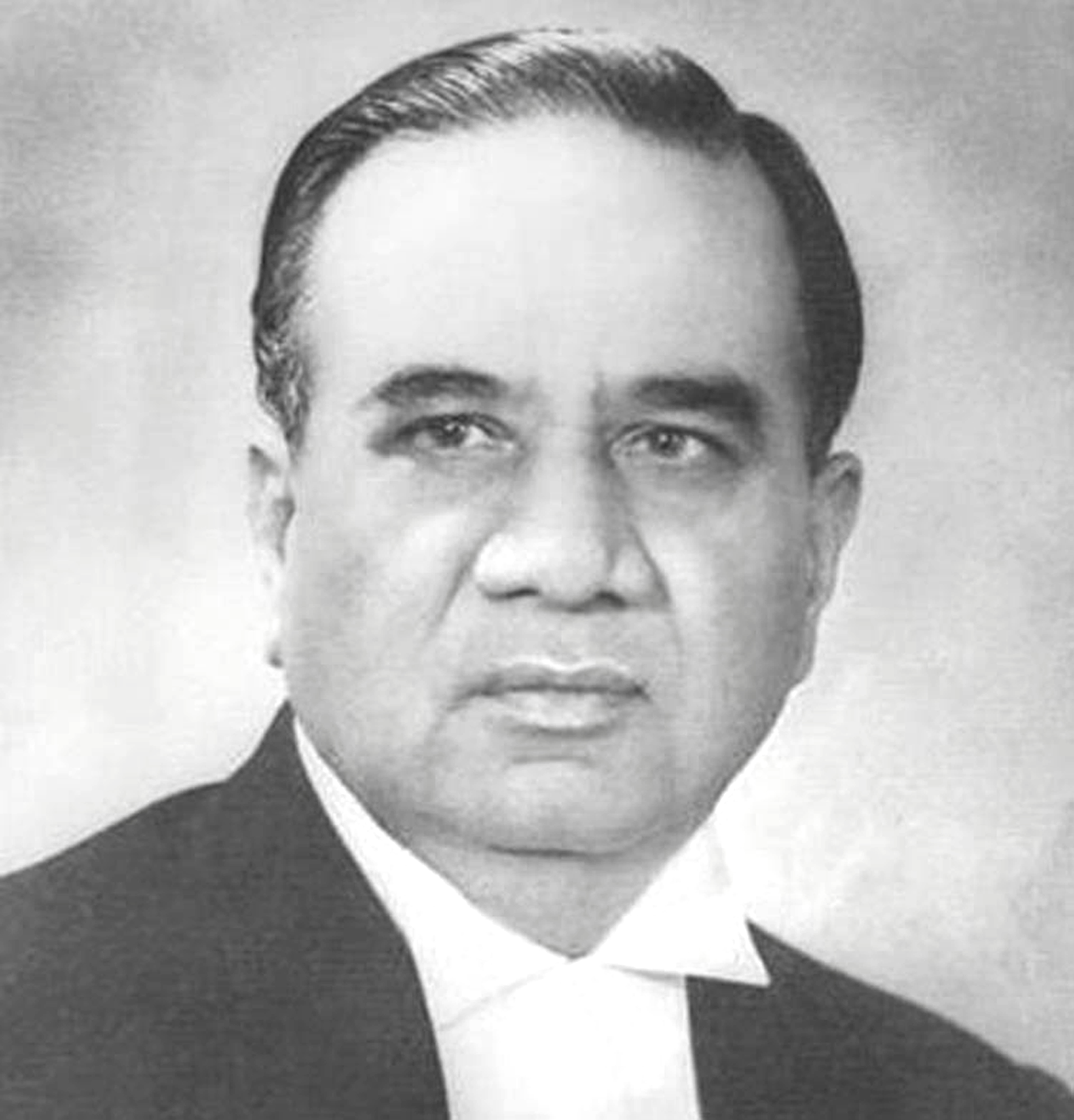

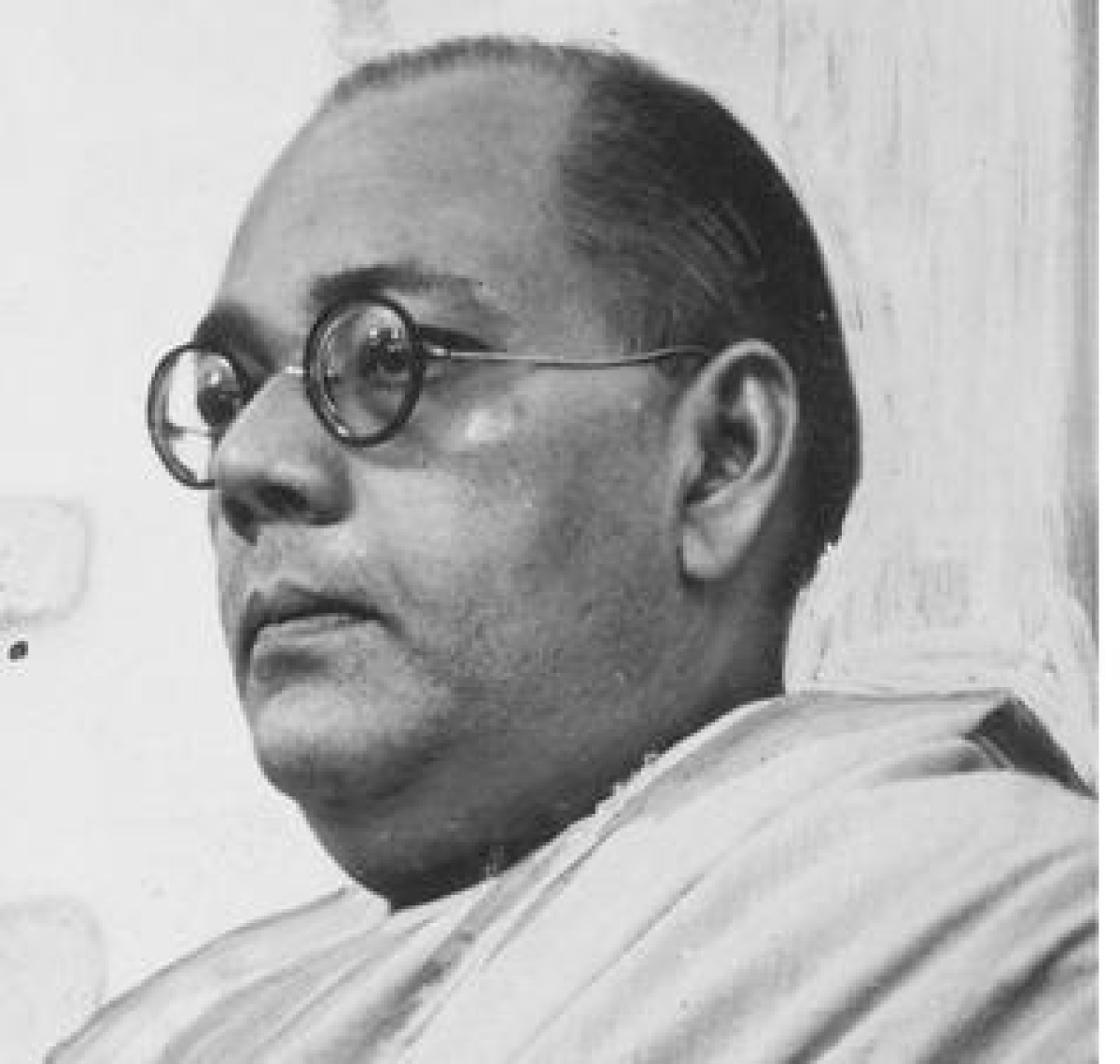

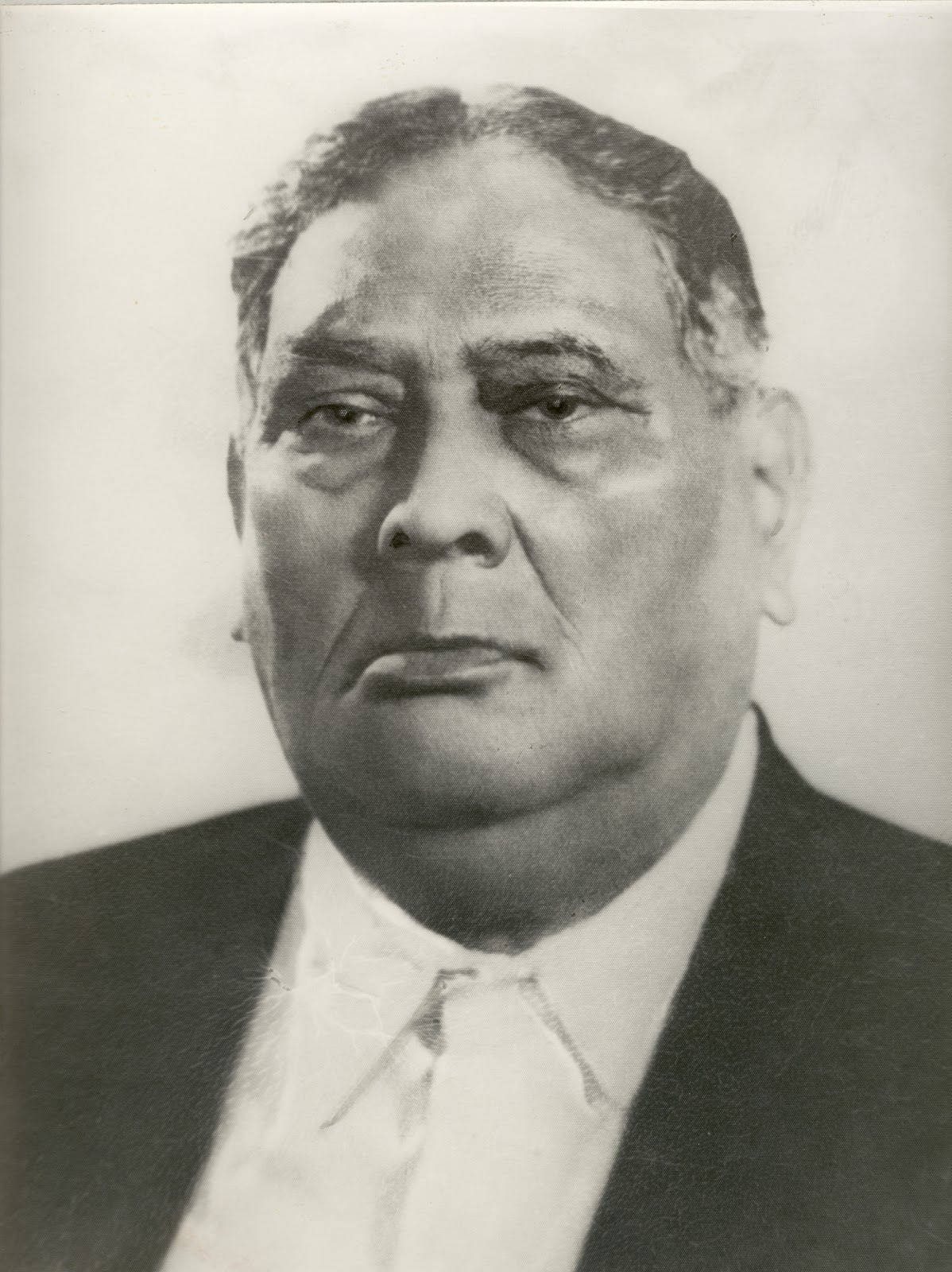

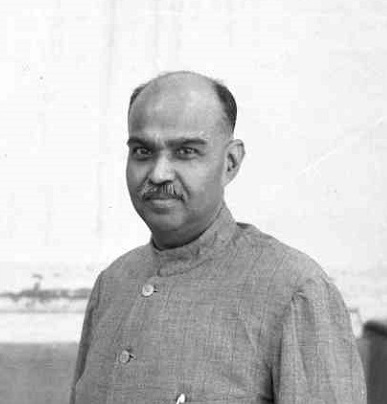
| | First party | Second party | Third party |
|---|---|---|---|
| Leader | Hussain Shaheed Suhrawardy | Sarat Chandra Bose | A. K. Fazlul Huq |
| Party | AIML | INC | KPP |
| Leader since | 1936 | 1936 | 1936 |
| Leader's seat | 24 Parganas Municipal (Mohammedan) | Calcutta South (General) | Bakarganj South (Mohammedan) |
| Last election | 43 | 54 | 37 |
| Seats won | 113 | 86 | 3 |
| Seat change | ▲70 | ▲32 | ▼34 |
| | Fourth party | Fifth party |
| Leader | Jyoti Bose | Syama Prasad Mookerjee |
| Party | CPI | ABHM |
| Leader since | 1944 | 1939 |
| Leader's seat | Railway Trade Union | Calcutta University |
| Last election | 0 | 4 |
| Seats won | 3 | 1 |
| Seat change | ▲3 | ▼3 |
Prime Minister before election
Governor's rule
Elected Prime Minister
Hussain Shaheed Suhrawardy
AIML

The 1946 Bengal Legislative Assembly election was held in January 1946 as part of the final British Indian provincial elections before independence and the last election of Undivided Bengal Province. The election resulted in a decisive victory for the All-India Muslim League, which formed the provincial government in the Bengal Legislative Assembly under Prime Minister Huseyn Shaheed Suhrawardy. The election played a crucial role in shaping the political future of Bengal, leading to the eventual partition of the province in 1947.

== Background ==
The campaign environment was heavily polarized. The All-India Muslim League, led in Bengal by Huseyn Shaheed Suhrawardy, framed the election as a referendum on the demand for Pakistan, urging Muslim voters to support the League exclusively. This strategy mobilized Muslim communities around the League's vision for a separate Muslim homeland.

Meanwhile, the Indian National Congress, with Sarat Chandra Bose leading the charge in Bengal, emphasized unity and a united India. Congress primarily contested general and Hindu seats, positioning itself as antithetical to partition and working to hold together a composite Bengal.

== Seats ==
The allocation of 250 seats in the assembly was based on the communal award. It is illustrated in the following.

- General elected seats- 78
- Muslim electorate seats- 117
  - Urban seats- 6
  - Rural seats- 111
- Anglo-Indian electorate seats- 3
- European electorate seats- 11
- Indian Christian electorate seats- 2
- Commerce, Industries and Planting seats- 19
  - Port of Calcutta
  - Port of Chittagong
  - Bengal Chamber of Commerce
  - Jute Interest
  - Tea Interest
  - Railways
  - Traders Associations
  - Others
- Zamindar seats- 5
- Labour representatives- 8
- Education seats- 2
  - University of Calcutta- 1
  - University of Dacca- 1
- Women seats- 5
  - General electorate- 2
  - Muslim electorate- 2
  - Anglo-Indian electorate- 1

== Results ==
The election resulted in a decisive victory for the All-India Muslim League, giving it a dominant position in the 250-member Assembly. The League's success was seen as a popular endorsement of the demand for Pakistan, particularly in Bengal, where Muslims constituted a majority of the population. The Indian National Congress secured most of the general (Hindu) seats, becoming the main opposition party. Other parties and independents also won a limited number of seats but failed to challenge the Muslim League's dominance in Muslim constituencies.

| Party | Seats |
|---|---|
| Muslim League | 114 |
| Indian National Congress | 86 |
| Krishak Praja Party | 3 |
| Communist Party of India | 3 |
| Hindu Mahasabha | 1 |
| Independent Hindus | 8 |
| Independent Muslims | 13 |
| Others | 22 |
| Total | 250 |

=== Assembly wise leads ===
| Constituency | Constituency Type | Elected Candidate |
|---|---|---|
| Calcutta North | General | Hemanta Kumar Basu |
| Calcutta East | General | Jyotish Chandra Ghosh |
| Calcutta North-Central | General | Iswar Das Jalan |
| Calcutta Central | General | Basantika Murarka |
| Calcutta South-Central | General | J. C. Gupta |
| Calcutta South | General | Satish Chandra Bose |
| Hooghly cum Howrah Municipal | General | Shopati Majumdar |
| Burdwan Division North Municipal | General | Nikinjo Behari Maiti |
| 24-Parganas Municipal | General | Bepin Behari Ganguli |
| Presidency Division Municipal | General | Satish Chandra Chakravarty |
| North Bengal Municipal | General | Manoranjan Dhar |
| East Bengal Municipal | General | Kiran Sankar Roy |
| Burdwan Central | General | Jadabendro Nath Panja |
| Burdwan North-West | General | Anandaprasad Mandal |
| Birbhum | General | Mihir Lal Chattopadhyay |
| Bankura West | General | Kanal Lal De |
| Bankura East | General | Kamal Krishna Ray |
| Midnapore Central | General | Charu Chandra Mahanty |
| Jhargram cum Ghatal | General | Ananda Prosad Chowdhery |
| Midnapore East | General | Rajani Kanta Pramanik |
| Midnapore South-West | General | Pramatha Nath Bandopadhya |
| Midnapore South-East | General | Iswar Chandra Mal |
| Hooghly North-East | General | Dhirendra Narayan Mukherji |
| Hooghly South-East | General | Sukumar Dutta |
| Howrah | General | Sudil Kumar Banerjee |
| 24-Parganas South-East | General | Bimal Chandra Sinha |
| 24-Parganas North-West | General | Charu Chandra Bhandari |
| Nadia | General | Haripada Chatterjee |
| Murshidabad | General | Shyamapada Bhattacharyya |
| Jessore | General | Bijoy Krishna Sarkar |
| Khulna | General | Gobinda Lal Banerjee |
| Rajshahi | General | Provash Chandra Lahiry |
| Malda | General | Ram Hari Roy |
| Dinajpur | General | Nishikanta Kundu |
| Jalpaiguri cum Siliguri | General | Khagendra Nath Das Gupta |
| Rangpur | General | Brojo Maifab Das |
| Bogra cum Pabna | General | Surendra Chandra Das Gupta |
| Dacca East | General | Ganendra Chandra Bhattacharyya |
| Dacca West | General | Monindra Nath Bhattacharjee |
| Mymensingh West | General | Benode Chandra Chakraborty |
| Mymensingh East | General | Amulya Chandra Adhikary |
| Faridpur | General | Dr. Pratap Chandra Guha Roy |
| Bakerganj South-West | General | Satindra Nath Sen |
| Bakerganj North-East | General | Manranjan Gupta |
| Tippera | General | Dhirendra Nath Datta |
| Noakhali | General | Haran Chandra Ghosh Chowdhury |
| Chittagong | General | Nellie Sen-Gupta |
| Darjeeling | General | Damber Singh Gurung |
| Burdwan Central | General (reserved for Scheduled Castes) | Kanaillal Das |
| Burdwan North-West | General (reserved for Scheduled Castes) | Baishnabchari Mandal |
| Birbhum | General (reserved for Scheduled Castes) | Nishapati Majhi |
| Bankura West | General (reserved for Scheduled Castes) | Ashutosh Mallick |
| Midnapore Central | General (reserved for Scheduled Castes) | Krishna Prasad Mandal |
| Jhargram cum Ghatal | General (reserved for Scheduled Castes) | Harendra Nath Defui |
| Hooghly East | General (reserved for Scheduled Castes) | Radha Nath Das |
| Howrah | General (reserved for Scheduled Castes) | Arabinda Gayen |
| 24-Parganas South-East | General (reserved for Scheduled Castes) | Hem Chandra Naskar |
| 24-Parganas North-West | General (reserved for Scheduled Castes) | Ardhendu Sekhar Naskar |
| Nadia | General (reserved for Scheduled Castes) | Purna Chandra Pramanik |
| Murshidabad | General (reserved for Scheduled Castes) | Kuber Chand Haldar |
| Jessore | General (reserved for Scheduled Castes) | Bhola Nath Biswas |
| Khulna | General (reserved for Scheduled Castes) | Rajendra Nath Sarkar |
| Khulna | General (reserved for Scheduled Castes) | Makunda Behary Mallick |
| Malda | General (reserved for Scheduled Castes) | Bir Birsa |
| Dinajpur | General (reserved for Scheduled Castes) | Rup Narayay Roy |
| Dinajpur | General (reserved for Scheduled Castes) | Harendra Nath Roy |
| Jalpaiguri cum Siliguri | General (reserved for Scheduled Castes) | Mohini Mohan Barman |
| Jalpaiguri cum Siliguri | General (reserved for Scheduled Castes) | Prasanna Deb Raikat |
| Rangpur | General (reserved for Scheduled Castes) | Rajani Kanta Ray Barman |
| Dinajpur | General (reserved for Scheduled Castes) | Nagendra Narayan Ray |
| Bogra cum Pabna | General (reserved for Scheduled Castes) | Haran Chandra Barman |
| Dacca East | General (reserved for Scheduled Castes) | Dhirendra Roy |
| Mymensingh West | General (reserved for Scheduled Castes) | Gayanath Biswas |
| Mymensingh East | General (reserved for Scheduled Castes) | Prafulla Ranjan Sarkar |
| Faridpur | General (reserved for Scheduled Castes) | Dwarka Nath Barury |
| Faridpur | General (reserved for Scheduled Castes) | Promatha Ranjan Thakur |
| Bakerganj South-West | General (reserved for Scheduled Castes) | – |
| Tippera | General (reserved for Scheduled Castes) | Jogendra Chandra Das |
| Calcutta North | Muhammadan | Md. Rafique, J.P. |
| Calcutta South | Muhammadan | K. Nooruddin |
| Hooghly cum Howrah Municipal | Muhammadan | Mohammad Sharif Khan |
| Barrackpore Municipal | Muhammadan | Md. Qumruddin |
| 24-Parganas Municipal | Muhammadan | Husayn Shaheed Suhrawardy |
| Dacca Municipal | Muhammadan | Nawabzada K. Nasrullah |
| Burdwan | Muhammadan | Abul Hashem |
| Birbhum | Muhammadan | Mudassir Hossain |
| Bankura | Muhammadan | Dr. Syed Muhammad Siddique |
| Midnapore | Muhammadan | Serajuddin Ahmed |
| Hooghly | Muhammadan | Abul Quasem |
| Howrah | Muhammadan | Mohainawad Idris |
| 24-Parganas South | Muhammadan | Jasimuddin Ahmed |
| 24-Parganas Central | Muhammadan | Illas Ali Molla |
| 24-Parganas North-East | Muhammadan | A.F.M. Abdur Rahman |
| Kushtia | Muhammadan | Shamsuddin Ahmed |
| Meherpur | Muhammadan | Abdul Hannan |
| Nadia East | Muhammadan | Maulvi Nawajesh Ahmed |
| Nadia West | Muhammadan | Molla Mohammad Abdul Halim |
| Berhampore | Muhammadan | Md. Khuda Bukbsh |
| Murshidabad South-West | Muhammadan | Sahibzada Kawan Jah Saiyid Kasim Ali Mirza |
| Jangipur | Muhammadan | Murtuza Reza Chowdhury |
| Jessore Sadar | Muhammadan | Lutfar Rahman |
| Jessore East | Muhammadan | Abdul Awal |
| Bongaon | Muhammadan | Serajul Islam |
| Jhenidah | Muhammadan | Tufazzal Hossain |
| Khulna | Muhammadan | Abdus Sabur Khan |
| Satkhira | Muhammadan | Dr. Abdul Ahad |
| Bagerhat | Muhammadan | Dr. Mosammel Hossain |
| Nator | Muhammadan | Kazi Abul Masud |
| Rajshahi North | Muhammadan | Maniruddin Akanda |
| Rajshahi South | Muhammadan | Abdul Hamid |
| Rajshahi Central | Muhammadan | Madar Bux |
| Balurghat | Muhammadan | Muzaffar Rahaman Chowdhury |
| Thakurgaon | Muhammadan | Hafizuddin Choudhuri |
| Dinajpur Central East | Muhammadan | Manivus Md. Abdullahel Baqui |
| Dinajpur Prayer East | Muhammadan | Hassan Ali |
| Jalpaiguri cum Darjeeling | Muhammadan | Nawab Musharruff Hossain, Khan Bahadur |
| Nilphamari | Muhammadan | Khairat Hossain |
| Rangpur North | Muhammadan | Mohammad Gwait, B.L. |
| Rangpur South | Muhammadan | Emad Uddin Ahmad |
| Kurigram North | Muhammadan | Paniruddin Ahmad |
| Kurigram South | Muhammadan | Nasir Hossain Khandkar |
| Gaibandha North | Muhammadan | Serajuddin Ahmed |
| Gaibandha South | Muhammadan | Ahammed Hossain |
| Bogra East | Muhammadan | Bediuzzaman Muhammad Elias |
| Bogra South | Muhammadan | Muhammad Ishaque |
| Bogra North | Muhammadan | Mobarok Ali Ahmed |
| Bogra West | Muhammadan | Mohammed Ali |
| Pabna East | Muhammadan | Dewan Lutfar Rahman |
| Pabna West | Muhammadan | Alai Masud Abdul Hamid |
| Serajganj South | Muhammadan | Abdus Raschid Mahmud |
| Serajganj North | Muhammadan | Md. Osman Gani |
| Serajganj Central | Muhammadan | Maulana Khoudker Abdur Rashid Tarkabagish |
| Malda North | Muhammadan | Mohammad Sayeed Mia |
| Malda South | Muhammadan | Tafur Ahmed Choudhury |
| Tangail North | Muhammadan | Ebrahim Khan |
| Netrakona South | Muhammadan | Asoo Ali Muktear |
| Netrakona North | Muhammadan | Moulvi Akbar Ali |
| Kishoreganj South | Muhammadan | Md. Israil |
| Kishoreganj North | Muhammadan | Syed Habibull Huq |
| Kishoreganj East | Muhammadan | Hamiduddin Ahmed |
| Gopalganj | Muhammadan | Shamsuddin Ahmed Khundkar |
| Goalundo | Muhammadan | Ahmed Ali Mridha |
| Faridpur West | Muhammadan | Yusuf Hossain Chowdhury |
| Faridpur East | Muhammadan | Chowdhury Samsuddin Ahmed alias Badsha Mia |
| Madaripur West | Muhammadan | Eskandar Ali Khan |
| Madaripur East | Muhammadan | Abdul Aziz Munshi |
| Patuakhali North | Muhammadan | Abdur Rahman Khan alias Nuru Mia |
| Patuakhali South | Muhammadan | Md. Shamsuddin Sikdar |
| Pirozpur South | Muhammadan | Khan Saheb Hatem Ali |
| Pirozpur North | Muhammadan | Khan Bahadur Syed Muhammad Afzal |
| Bakerganj North | Muhammadan | Mahammad Arif Chaudhery (Dhava Mla) |
| Bakerganj South | Muhammadan | Abul Kasum Fazlul Haq |
| Bakerganj West | Muhammadan | Maulana Haji Muhammad Quasem |
| Bhola North | Muhammadan | Nuruzzaman |
| Bhola South | Muhammadan | Syed Askur Rahman |
| Brahmanbaria North | Muhammadan | Mohammad Rakuuddin |
| Brahmanbaria South | Muhammadan | Ali Ahmad Khan |
| Tippera North-East | Muhammadan | Tafazzal Ali |
| Tippera North | Muhammadan | Mafisuddin Ahmed |
| Tippera West | Muhammadan | Nowab Ali |
| Tippera Central | Muhammadan | Abdul Momin |
| Tippera South | Muhammadan | Syed Sarajal Haque |
| Chandpur East | Muhammadan | Jumab Ali Mia |
| Chandpur West | Muhammadan | Abidur Reza Chowdhury |
| Matlabbazar | Muhammadan | Mohammad Abdus Salam |
| Noakhali North | Muhammadan | Fazlur Rahman |
| Noakhali Central | Muhammadan | Mujibar Rahman |
| Ramganj cum Raipur | Muhammadan | Fazlul Karim |
| Noakhali South-West | Muhammadan | Abdul Hakim Mia |
| Noakhali South | Muhammadan | Maulana Abdul Hai |
| Feni | Muhammadan | Muhammad Habibullah Choudhury |
| Cox's Bazar | Muhammadan | Kabir Ahmed Chowdhury |
| Chittagong South | Muhammadan | Ahmed Kabir Chowdhury |
| Chittagong South Central | Muhammadan | Ali Ahmad Chowdhury |
| Chittagong North-East | Muhammadan | Farid Ahmad Chowdhury |
| Chittagong North-West | Muhammadan | Fazlal Qadir |
| Calcutta | Women General | Bina Das |
| Dacca | Women General | Ashalata Sen |
| Calcutta | Women Muhammadan | Hussan Ara Begam |
| Dacca | Women Muhammadan | Anwara Khatun |
| Anglo-Indian | Women Anglo-Indian | Edna May Ricketts |
| Anglo-Indian | Anglo-Indian | L. B. Fenton |
| Anglo-Indian | Anglo-Indian | R. R. Patrick |
| Anglo-Indian | Anglo-Indian | G. C. D. Wilks |
| Burdwan Division | European | Joseph Arthur Powell |
| Hooghly cum Howrah | European | Garth Wilkinson |
| Calcutta and Suburbs | European | David Charles Bethune Pilkington |
| Calcutta and Suburbs | European | Stanley Kostem Sawday |
| Calcutta and Suburbs | European | Alan Forret Stark |
| Calcutta and Suburbs | European | William Christopher Wordsworth, C.I.E. |
| Presidency Division | European | A. Bruce Smith |
| Rajshahi Division | European | Ian Fortune Morriss |
| Darjeeling | European | Douglas Gregory Smyth-Osbourne |
| Dacca Division | European | John Nelson Smart |
| Chittagong Division | European | C. P. G., Wade |
| Calcutta cum Presidency Division | Indian Christian | Daniel Gomes |
| Dacca Division | Indian Christian | R. A. Gomes |
| Bengal Chamber of Commerce | Commerce and industries | – |
| Bengal Chamber of Commerce | Commerce and industries | Rogers Haywood |
| Bengal Chamber of Commerce | Commerce and industries | Andrew William Taylor, O.B.E. |
| Bengal Chamber of Commerce | Commerce and industries | Donald Gladding, C.I.E. |
| Bengal Chamber of Commerce | Commerce and industries | Charles Watt Miles |
| Bengal Chamber of Commerce | Commerce and industries | – |
| Bengal Chamber of Commerce | Commerce and industries | Hubert Rowan Hodge |
| Calcutta Trades Association | Commerce and industries | N. Stokes |
| Calcutta Trades Association | Commerce and industries | H. R. Norton, M.B.E. |
| Indian Jute Mills Association | Commerce and industries | David Inglis Duff |
| Indian Jute Mills Association | Commerce and industries | George Masson Mackinlay |
| Indian Tea Association | Commerce and industries | Rolfe Alexander Harcourt Stevenson |
| Indian Tea Association | Commerce and industries | Kenneth Richardson Reynolds |
| Indian Mining Association | Commerce and industries | Reginald Binyon Whitehead |
| Bengal National Chamber of Commerce | Commerce and industries | A. K. Ghosh |
| Bengal National Chamber of Commerce | Commerce and industries | Bimal Comar Ghose |
| Indian Chamber of Commerce | Commerce and industries | Debi Prosad Khaitan |
| Marwari Association | Commerce and industries | Annandall Poddar |
| Muslim Chamber of Commerce | Commerce and industries | M. A. H. Ispahani, M.L.A. |
| Burdwan Landholders | Commerce and industries | Sir Uday Chand Mahtab |
| Presidency Landholders | Landholders | Maharaja Sris Chandra Nady≤ |
| Rajshahi Landholders | Landholders | Narendra Singh Singhi |
| Dacca Landholders | Landholders | Sitangshu Kanta Acharjee |
| Chittagong Landholders | Landholders | Kumar Arun Chandra Sinha |
| Railway Trade Union | Labour | Jyoti Basu |
| Water Transport Trade Union | Labour | Dr. A. M. Malik |
| Calcutta and Suburbs (Registered Factories) | Labour | Dr. Suresh Chandra Banerji |
| Barrackpore (Registered Factories) | Labour | Niharendu Dutt Mazumdar |
| Howrah (Registered Factories) | Labour | Sibnath Banerjee |
| Hooghly-cum Serampore (Registered Factories) | Labour | A. A. Zaman |
| Colliery (Coal Mines) | Labour | Debendranath Sen |
| Darjeeling Sadar | Labour | Ratanlal Brahman |
| Calcutta University | University | Dr. Syamaprasad Mookerjee |
| Dacca University | University | Fazlur Rahman |

== Aftermath ==
=== Government formation ===
Following the election, Huseyn Shaheed Suhrawardy of the Muslim League was invited to form the government. He became the Chief Minister of Bengal in April 1946 and led a Muslim League-only ministry, one of the few provinces to be governed solely by the League during this period.

Suhrawardy's government functioned during a period of intense political negotiations over the future of India. His administration promoted provincial autonomy, economic reform aimed at Muslim-majority rural areas, and furthered the League's vision of Pakistan. The strong electoral mandate in Bengal was later used by Muslim League leaders to argue that Muslims in eastern India supported partition.

=== United Bengal plan ===
In the months leading up to Partition, a proposal emerged to create an independent, undivided Bengal, separate from both India and Pakistan. This initiative, known as the United Bengal Plan, was spearheaded by Huseyn Shaheed Suhrawardy, the then Chief Minister of Bengal, and Sarat Chandra Bose, a prominent Congress leader and elder brother of Subhas Chandra Bose.

The plan envisioned Bengal as a sovereign nation-state, free from communal division, where Hindus and Muslims would co-govern a pluralistic society. Proponents argued that Bengal's unique cultural and economic unity should not be destroyed by partition. They emphasized Bengal's interdependent religious communities and sought to avoid the displacement and violence that partition would likely bring.

At the same time, constitutional negotiations were underway at the national level. The Cabinet Mission Plan of 1946 proposed a federal structure for India, grouping provinces into sections with significant autonomy, leaving open the possibility for provinces like Bengal to choose their political future. The United Bengal Plan was thus seen by its advocates as a practical response aligned with the Cabinet Mission's emphasis on provincial autonomy and regional grouping.

Suhrawardy and Bose received some backing from other political figures, including Kiran Shankar Roy and Abul Hashim, then Secretary of the Bengal Provincial Muslim League. They also sought support from Mahatma Gandhi and the British Cabinet Mission, both of whom showed some interest in the idea as a potential solution to the communal deadlock.

However, the proposal faced strong resistance from both the Indian National Congress and the Hindu Mahasabha, particularly in western Bengal. Many Hindu leaders feared that an independent Bengal with a Muslim majority would marginalize Hindu interests and effectively align Bengal with Pakistan. The All-India Muslim League, while initially cautious, ultimately supported partition along religious lines, consistent with its wider campaign for Pakistan.

On 20 June 1947, in a special session of the Bengal Legislative Assembly, members voted on the issue of partition. The Muslim-majority legislators voted for joining Pakistan, while non-Muslim members voted for remaining in India. This resulted in the partition of Bengal under the Indian Independence Act 1947, forming East Bengal (Pakistan) and West Bengal (India) on 15 August 1947. The Suhrawardy ministry came to an end with the dissolution of the United Bengal Assembly.

== Further sources ==
- Shila Sen: Muslim Politics in Bengal 1937-47. Impex India: New Delhi, 1976 (online summary)
- Assembly Proceedings Official Report Bengal Legislative Assembly Second Session 1946 The 17th 24th 25th 26th 27th 30th and 31st July and 1st August 1946 (online version)
- AdvocateTanmoy.com: History of West Bengal Legislative Assembly from 1861
