= United Front (East Pakistan) =

Coalition of political parties

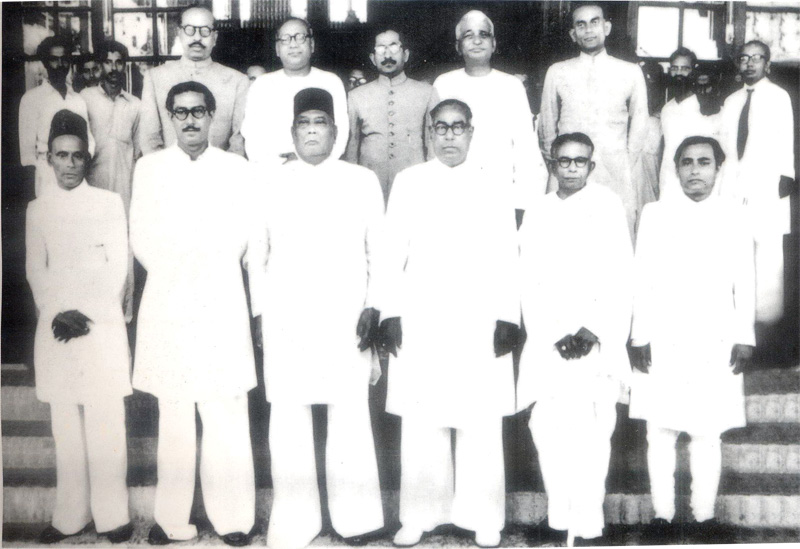
- 1954 East Bengal cabinet formed by the United Front
- Urdu name: متحدہ محاذ
- Bengali name: যুক্তফ্রন্ট
- Abbreviation: UF
- President: A. K. Fazlul Huq
- General Secretary: Ataur Rahman Khan
- Founders: A. K. Fazlul Huq Ataur Rahman Khan Abdul Hamid Khan Bhashani Huseyn Shaheed Suhrawardy Sheikh Mujibur Rahman Mahmud Ali Shamsul Huq Nurul Amin Khaleque Nawaz Khan
- Founded: 4 December 1953
- Dissolved: 13 April 1958
- Headquarters: Dacca, East Pakistan
- Ideology: Islamic democracy Islamic socialism Antifeudalism; Bengali interests
- Political position: Big tent
- Religion: Islam
- Members: AML; KSP; GD; NIP
- Slogan: United Front Zindabad; Huq–Bhasani Zindabad
- Constituent Assembly (1955): 16 / 72
- East Pakistan Legislative Assembly (1954): 223 / 309

Election symbol
- Boat

The United Front was a coalition of political parties in East Bengal that contested and won Pakistan's first provincial general election to the East Bengal Legislative Assembly. The coalition consisted of the Awami Muslim League, the Krishak Sramik Party, the Ganatantri Dal (Democratic Party), and Nizam-e-Islam. The coalition was led by four major Bengali populist leaders: A. K. Fazlul Huq, Huseyn Shaheed Suhrawardy, Maulana Bhashani and Mahmud Ali. The election resulted in a crushing defeat for the Muslim League. Veteran student leader of East Pakistan, Khaleque Nawaz Khan, defeated sitting prime minister of East Pakistan, Nurul Amin, in Nandail Constituency of Mymensingh district and created history in the political arena. Nurul Amin's crushing defeat to a 27-year-old young Turk of the United Front effectively eliminated the Muslim League from the political landscape of the then East Pakistan, with United Front parties securing a landslide victory and gaining 223 seats in the 309-member assembly. The Awami League emerged as the majority party, with 143 seats.

A. K. Fazlul Huq of the Krishak Sramik Party became Chief Minister of East Pakistan upon the victory of the United Front. The election propelled popular Bengali leaders into the Pakistani federal government, with leaders such as Hussain Shaheed Suhrawardy and Abul Mansur Ahmed becoming key federal ministers. In the provincial government, young leaders such as Sheikh Mujibur Rahman, Yusuf Ali Chowdhury and Khaleque Nawaz Khan rose to prominence. The United Front demanded greater provincial autonomy for East Pakistan. It passed a landmark order for the establishment of the Bangla Academy in Dhaka.

== Twenty-One Point Programme ==
Twenty-One Point Programme objectives were incorporated in the election manifesto of the United Front, an alliance of the opposition political parties, to contest elections of the East Bengal Legislative Assembly in 1954 against the then party in power, the Muslim League. The United Front was composed of four political parties of East Bengal, namely Awami Muslim League, Krishak Sramik Party, Nezam-e-Islam and Ganatantri Dal. The Front was formed on 14 November 1953 by the initiative of AK Fazlul Huq of Krishak Sramik Party, Maulana Abdul Hamid Khan Bhasani and Huseyn Shaheed Suhrawardy of Awami Muslim League, and Mahmud Ali of Ganatantri Dal.

The 21-point package programme in the election manifesto adopted by the United Front runs as follows:

1. To recognise Bangla as one of the State Languages of Pakistan;

2. To abolish without compensation zamindari and all rent receiving interest in land, and to distribute the surplus lands amongst the cultivators; to reduce rent to a fair level and abolish the certificate system of realising rent;

3. To nationalise the jute trade and bring it under the direct control of the government of East Bengal, secure fair price of jute to the growers and to investigate into the jute-bungling during the Muslim League regime to punish those found responsible for it;

4. To introduce co-operative farming in agriculture and to develop cottage industries with full government subsidies;

5. To start salt industry (both small and large scale) to make East Bengal self-sufficient in the supply of salt, and to investigate into the salt-bungling during the Muslim League regime to punish the offenders;

6. To rehabilitate immediately all the poor refugees (displaced by the Partition) belonging to the artisan and technician class;

7. To protect the country from flood and famine by means of digging canals and improving irrigation system;

8. To make the country self-sufficient by modernising the method of cultivation and industrialisation, and to ensure the rights of the labourer as per ILO Convention;

9. To introduce free and compulsory primary education throughout the country and to arrange for just pay and allowances to the teachers;

10. To restructure the entire education system, introduce mother tongue as the medium of instruction, remove discrimination between government and private schools and to turn all the schools into government aided institutions;

11. To repeal all reactionary laws including those of the Dhaka and Rajshahi Universities and to make them autonomous institutions; to make education cheaper and easily available to the people;

12. To curtail the cost of administration and to rationalise the pay scale of high and low paid government servants. The ministers shall not receive more than 1000 taka as monthly salary;

13. To take steps to eradicate corruption, nepotism and bribery, and with this end in view, to take stocks of the properties of all government officers and businessmen from 1940 onward and forfeit all properties the acquisition of which is not satisfactorily accounted for;

14. To repeal all Safety and Preventive Detention Acts of Ayub Khan and release all prisoners detained without trial, and try in open court persons involved in anti-state activities; to safeguard the rights of the press and of holding meetings;

15. To separate the judiciary from the executive;

16. To locate the residence of the chief minister of the United Front at a less costly house, and to convert Burdwan House (a palatial residence once owned by the Maharajas of Burdwan) into a students hostel now, and later, into an institute for research on Bangla language and literature;

17. To erect a monument in memory of the martyrs of the Language Movement on the spot where they were shot dead, and to pay compensation to the families of the martyrs;

18. To declare 21 February as 'Shaheed Day' and a public holiday;

19. The Lahore Resolution proposed full autonomy of East Bengal leaving defence, foreign affairs and currency under the central government. In the matter of defence, arrangements shall be made to set the headquarters of the army in West Pakistan and the naval headquarters in East Bengal and to establish ordnance factories in East Bengal, and to transform Ansar force into a full-fledged militia equipped with arms;

20. The United Front Ministry shall on no account extend the tenure of the Legislature and shall resign six months before the general elections to facilitate free and fair elections under an Election Commission;

21. All casual vacancies in the Legislature shall be filled up through by-elections within three months of the vacancies, and if the nominees of the Front are defeated in three successive by-elections, ministry shall resign from office.

In the elections of East Bengal Legislative Assembly held in March 1954, the United Front won 223 seats out of 237 Muslim seats, whereas the ruling Muslim League managed to bag only 9 seats.

== Dissolution of United Front government ==
The United Front ministry was sworn in on 3 April 1954 and the cabinet was expanded on 15 May in order to include members of the Awami Muslim League. However, on that very day, deadly clashes broke out between Bengali-speaking Bengali Muslim and Urdu-speaking Bihari Muslim labourers at the Adamjee Jute Mills, leaving 1500 dead. The Communist Party of Pakistan, with which the United Front government had a close relationship, was blamed for causing this incident by the central government. Both A. K Fazlul Haque and Maulana Bhashani denied the allegation and insisted that Muslim League was involved with the incident instead. Eventually, on 30 May 1954, within weeks of assuming power, the newly elected provincial legislature was dismissed by Governor-General Ghulam Muhammad, upon accusations of mismanagement and secession against A K Fazlul Huq, who was placed under house-arrest. The central government of Pakistan was alarmed at the United Front's victory, and while it instituted Governor General's rule in East Pakistan, the central government instituted the One Unit plan in West Pakistan, where they amalgamated all of Pakistan's provinces into one giant province called West Pakistan to try to prevent the smaller provinces from coordinating with East Bengal to offset Punjab's overwhelming power in the military and civil government of Pakistan. The One Unit scheme was essentially an anti-democratic provocation meant to stop East Bengal from taking advantage of its numerical superiority. It also alienated the smaller provinces of West Pakistan by robbing the Sindhis, Baluchis and Pashtuns of their provincial identities. The overthrow of the United Front government and the creation of the One Unit of West Pakistan alienated the Bengalis and caused them to demand maximum autonomy or even to secede from Pakistan.

The dismissal of the United Front was a key turning point in aggravating East Pakistan's grievances in the Pakistani union, and led Maulana Bhashani to openly call for separation and independence in 1957, in his Salaam, Pakistan (Farewell, Pakistan) speech.
