= Abu Hussain Sarkar =

Bengali politician and Chief Minister of East Pakistan (1894–1969)

- আবু হোসেন সরকার ابو حسین سرکار
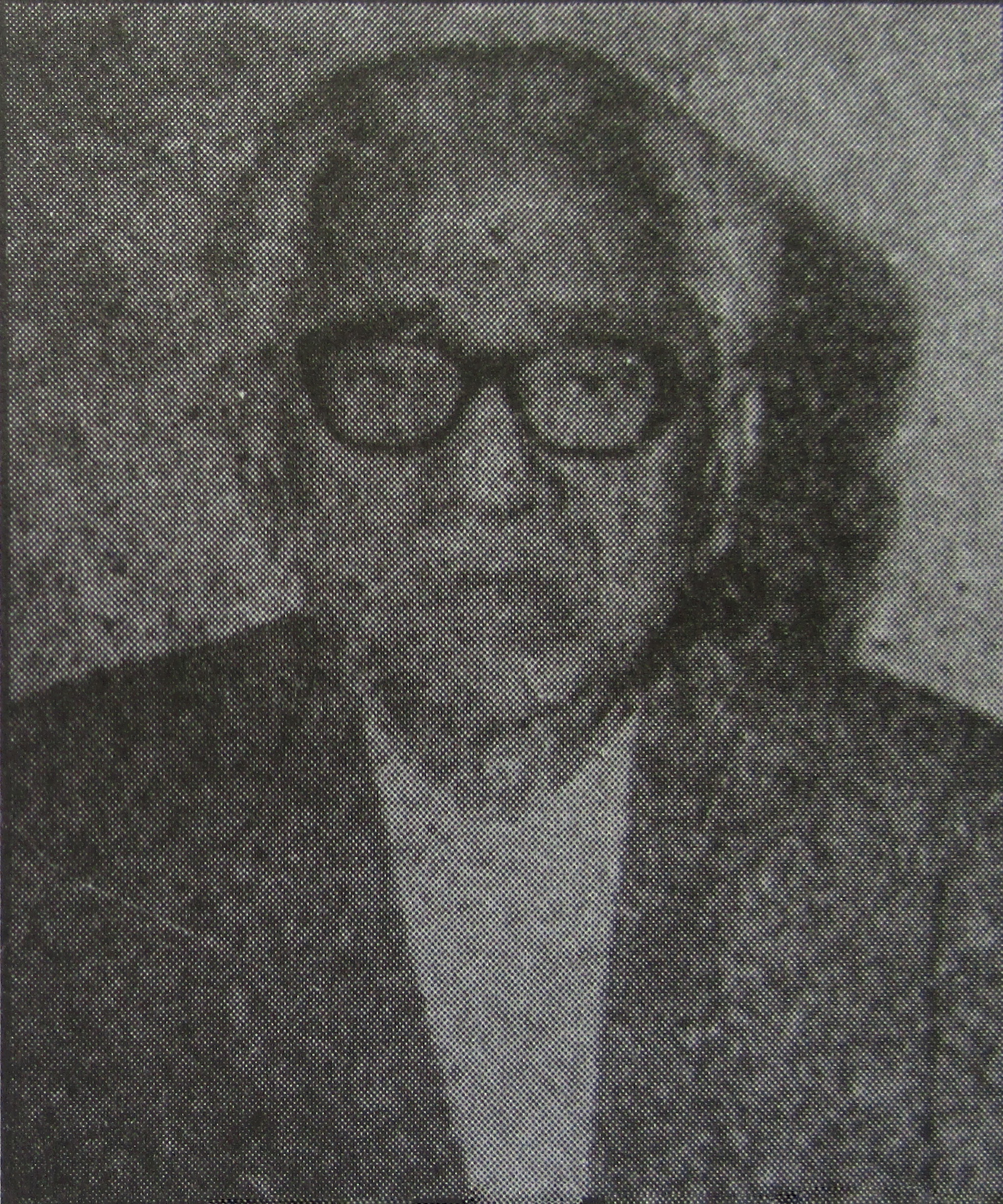

4th Chief Minister of East Pakistan
- In office 3 June 1955 – 30 August 1956
- Governor: Muhammad Shahabuddin (acting) Amiruddin Ahmad A K Fazlul Huq
- Preceded by: A. K. Fazlul Huq
- Succeeded by: Ataur Rahman Khan

Member of the Bengal Legislative Assembly
- In office 1937–1945
- Succeeded by: Serajuddin Ahmed
- Constituency: Gaibandha North

Leader of the Opposition of East Pakistan
- In office 1 September 1956 – 13 April 1958
- Leader: Ataur Rahman Khan
- Preceded by: Ataur Rahman Khan
- Succeeded by: Office abolished

Personal details
- Born: 1894 Sadullapur, Bengal, British India
- Died: 17 April 1969 (aged 74–75) Dacca, East Pakistan, Pakistan
- Party: Shramik Krishak Samajbadi Dal

Abu Hussain Sarkar (Bengali: আবু হোসেন সরকার; Urdu: ابو حسین سرکار; 1894 – 17 April 1969) was a Pakistani Bengali politician and lawyer. He served as the fourth chief minister of East Pakistan. Under his ministry, the Bangla Academy was inaugurated, and 21 February was recognised as Shohid Dibosh (Language Movement Day) in memory of the Bengali language movement.

== Early life and education ==
Sarkar was born in 1894 to a Bengali Muslim family in Sadullapur, Gaibandha, which was then part of the Rangpur District of the Bengal Presidency. He was involved in the Swadeshi movement, which disrupted his education and led to his arrest in 1911. He was later released and passed his matriculation in 1915. He then studied further, gaining a Bachelor of Law degree.

== Career ==
Sarkar started his law practice in the Rangpur bar. He joined the Indian National Congress but left it over differences. In 1935, he joined A K Fazlul Huq's Krishak Praja Party. He contested in the 1937 Bengal legislative elections, winning in the Gaibandha North constituency.

After Pakistan gained its independence, Sarkar played an important role in the formation of the Krishak Sramik Party in 1953. In 1953, he was elected to the East Bengal Legislative Assembly as a member of the United Front. In 1955 he held the post of Minister of Health in the government of Chaudhry Muhammad Ali. In June 1955, Sarkar was elected the chief minister of East Bengal. His government nominated 21 February as Shohid Dibosh and a public holiday. He started the construction of Central Shaheed Minar. As chief minister, he also inaugurated the Bangla Academy. He resigned on 30 August 1956 over inflation of food grains and subsequent food shortages.

From 1956 to 1958, Sarkar was the president of the Krishak Sramik Party and the leader of the opposition party. He played an important role in the formation of the United Front led by Huseyn Shaheed Suhrawardy. He campaigned for the restoration of democracy in Pakistan.

== Death ==
Sarkar died on 17 April 1969 in Dhaka in the then East Pakistan.
