= Krishak Sramik Party =

British Indian anti-feudal political party (1929–1958)

Krishak Sramik Party Farmer Labourer Party
- Urdu name: کسان مزدور پارٹی
- Bengali name: কৃষক শ্রমিক পার্টি
- Abbreviation: KSP
- Founder: A. K. Fazlul Huq
- Founded: 1929; 97 years ago
- Preceded by: Krishak Praja Party (1929–1947)
- Headquarters: Dhaka
- Ideology: Nationalism; Agrarianism; Anti-feudalism; Egalitarianism; Islamic democracy; Progressivism; Populism
- Religion: Islam
- National affiliation: United Front (1953–1958); National Democratic Front (1962–1969); United Coalition Party (1971)
- Colors: Navy Blue

The Krishak Sramik Party (Bengali: কৃষক শ্রমিক পার্টি, Farmer Labourer Party) was a major anti-feudal political party in the British Indian province of Bengal and later in the Dominion of Pakistan's East Bengal and East Pakistan provinces. It was founded in 1929 as the Nikhil Banga Praja Samiti to represent the interests of tenant farmers in Bengal's landed gentry estates. Sir Abdur Rahim was its first leader. A. K. Fazlul Huq was elected leader in 1935 when the former was appointed as the president of the Central Legislative Assembly of India.

In 1936, it changed its name to Krishak Praja Party (Bengali: কৃষক প্রজা পার্টি Farmer Tenant Party) and contested the 1937 election. The party formed the first government in the Bengal Legislative Assembly. After the partition of British India, it was reorganized as the Krishak Sramik Party (Farmer-Labour Party) to contest the 1954 election, as part of the United Front. The coalition won the election and formed the provincial government in the East Bengal Legislative Assembly.

The party's politics played an important role in the growth of Bengali Muslim political consciousness; it also received support from large sections of the Bengali Hindu population who resented the influence of the landed gentry.

The party was the political vehicle of the Bengali lawyer and politician A. K. Fazlul Huq, who served as the Prime Minister of Bengal and Chief Minister of East Bengal. Another chief minister from the party was Abu Hussain Sarkar (1955–56). Abdus Sattar, one of the party's leaders, later became the President of Bangladesh.

== Background ==
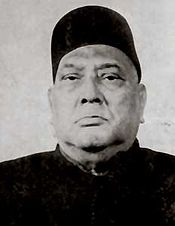
A K Fazlul Huq was popularly called the Sher-e-Bangla (Lion of Bengal)

The Permanent Settlement established an extensive feudal system in the Bengal Presidency. Large sections of the population became tenant farmers of landlords (zamindars). Many of the landlords were wealthy Hindus who enjoyed the patronage of the British. The permanent settlement displaced much of the Mughal ruling class with many Hindu landed estates; but there continued to be influential Muslim landed estates. British Bengal's wealthy Hindu oligarchy included Marwari merchants in Calcutta, the political and commercial capital of Bengal and the British Indian Empire. In contrast, the province of Bengal had a Bengali Muslim-majority population, with large minorities of non-upper class Hindus. In 1905, the British government implemented the first partition of Bengal, with support from the Muslim aristocracy, to increase investment in Eastern Bengal and Assam. The partition stoked vocal protests from Hindu landlords and merchants in Calcutta, who argued that it was a policy to divide and rule Bengal. In 1911, the partition was annulled. But the partition left a strong legacy and enjoyed support in the Muslim population. The All India Muslim League and Bengal Provincial Muslim League were formed to uphold the interests of Muslims amid the growth of Hindu nationalist movements. But the All India Muslim League was dominated by members of the Muslim aristocracy, who were often speakers of Hindustani, instead of the vernacular Bengali language. Bengal's middle classes, professionals and farmers increasingly looked for an alternative platform of this party.

== History ==
=== 1929–1947 ===
The party's lifetime was mostly in the period of the British Raj

In 1929, 18 members of the Bengal Legislative Council formed the All Bengal Tenants Association, which became known as the Praja Party. Its leaders included A. K. Fazlul Huq, Sir Azizul Haque, Maulvi Tamizuddin Khan and Sir Abdur Rahim. The group was formed to capitalize on the resentment caused among peasants by the Bengal Tenancy (Amendment) Act, 1928, which enjoyed the support of wealthy Hindus.

When the Government of India Act 1935 planned the 1937 Indian provincial elections, the Praja Party was renamed as the Krishak Praja Party, with the intention of appealing to a broad rural base. Its main rivals were the Bengal Congress and the Bengal Provincial Muslim League. The Krishak Praja Party won 36 seats in the Bengal Legislative Assembly. Due to non-cooperation and boycott of the new system by the Congress, the Krishak Praja Party claimed the right to form a government, with support from the Muslim League. A. K. Fazlul Huq became the first Prime Minister of Bengal. As part of reforming the zamindari system, Prime Minister Huq used legal and administrative measures to relieve the debts of farmers. The party saw internal rebellion soon after taking power and Huq emerged as its lone cabinet member.

In 1940, Prime Minister Huq supported the Muslim League's Lahore Resolution.

The Huq ministry governed during the period of World War II. In 1941, the Muslim League withdrew support for Prime Minister Huq after he joined the Viceroy's defence council against the wishes of the League's president Muhammad Ali Jinnah. Jinnah felt the council was dominated by politicians who did not support the partition of India. Huq was joined on the council by the premier of Punjab, Sir Sikandar Hayat Khan. In Bengal, Huq formed a second coalition with the Hindu Mahasabha and its leader Syama Prasad Mukherjee. The Huq-Syama coalition lasted until 1943, when the Muslim League secured majority support in the assembly.

=== 1953–1997 ===
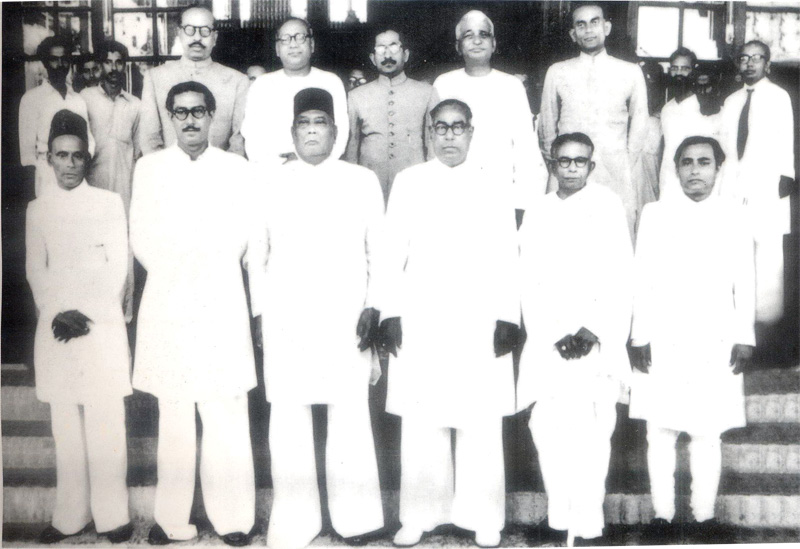
The 1954 East Bengal cabinet consisting of Krishak Sramik Party and Awami League

A. K. Fazlul Huq revived the party as the Krishak Sramik Party (Farmer-Labour Party) in 1954. The party was part of the United Front coalition that contested the 1954 East Bengali legislative election; with a 21-point manifesto. The coalition secured a landslide victory. The Krishak Sramik Party itself won 48 seats in the East Bengal Legislative Assembly. Huq served as Chief Minister of East Bengal for six weeks. During his tenure, Huq took steps to establish the Bangla Academy. He was dismissed after allegations of inciting secession. After a period of Governor General's rule, Krishak Sramik Party leader Abu Hussain Sarkar became the Chief Minister of East Pakistan in 1955. Sarkar lost his majority in 1956, after which President's rule was imposed. Awami League leader Ataur Rahman Khan then became chief minister.

In August 1955, a coalition between the Krishak Sramik Party in East Pakistan and the Muslim League in West Pakistan allowed Chaudhry Mohammad Ali to become Prime Minister and A. K. Fazlul Huq to become the federal Home Minister. Prime Minister Ali was later dismissed by President Iskander Mirza, who allowed a coalition of the Awami League and Republican Party to form government. As a result, the Krishak Sramik Party and the Muslim League formed the main opposition.

Following the 1958 Pakistani coup, all provincial assemblies, including in East Pakistan, were dissolved. Numerous political figures were arrested, with Huq placed under house arrest. The Elected Bodies Disqualification Order barred 75 politicians from holding public office for eight years (until 1966). It is reported to be survived till 1958 in Pakistan. However, Huq died in 1962 and A.S.M. Sulaiman became the president by 1971.

In 1979 Bangladeshi general election the party participated and he became member of parliament from Narayanganj-3. he died in 1997 and maintained his office till his death.

== Presidents ==
- Abdur Rahim (1929–1934)
- A. K. Fazlul Huq (1935–1955)
- Hamidul Huq Choudhury (1955–????)
- Abdul Hye (????)
- A.S.M. Sulaiman (1970–1997)
- M. A. Latif Mazumder (1997–2015)

== See also ==
- Unionist Party (Punjab)
- Bengal Provincial Muslim League
- Legislatures of British India

== Bibliography ==
Nair, M Bhaskaran (1990). Politics in Bangladesh: A Study of Awami League, 1949-58 (PDF). India: Northern Book Centre (New Delhi). ISBN 8185119791.
