= List of members of the 4th National Assembly of Pakistan =

4th National Assembly
←	3rd	5th	→
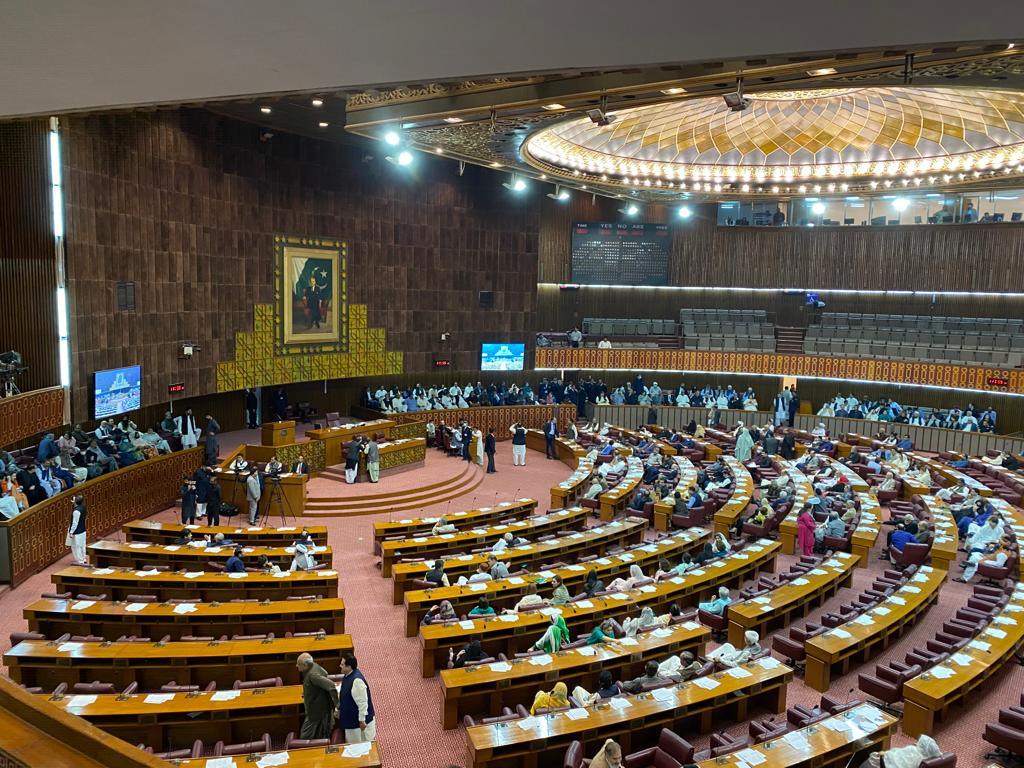

Overview
- Legislative body: National Assembly of Pakistan
- Jurisdiction: Pakistan
- Term: 1965 – 1969
- Election: 1965 Pakistani general election
- Government: Government of Pakistan
- Website: Official website

Sovereign
- Members: 156
- President: Ayub Khan

The 4th Parliament of Pakistan was the unicameral legislature of Pakistan formed after the 3rd Parliament of Pakistan. There were 156 Members of Parliament, including 78 from East Pakistan and 78 from West Pakistan.

== East Pakistan ==
Note: The election constituencies from the general election of 1965 are listed below, they do not link to the most recent election constituencies because they have been completely altered.

	District	Constituency	Party	Member
Rajshahi	Rangpur	NE-1 (Rangpur-1)	Convention Muslim League	Paniruddin Ahmed
Rajshahi	Rangpur	NE-2 (Rangpur-II)	Convention Muslim League	Abdul Awal Khan
Rajshahi	Rangpur	NE-3 (Rangpur-III)	Convention Muslim League	Ataur Rahman
Rajshahi	Rangpur	NE-4 (Rangpur-IV)	Convention Muslim League	Mohammad Owais
Rajshahi	Rangpur	NE-5 (Rangpur-V)	National Awami Party	Mashiur Rahman Jadu Mia
Rajshahi	Rangpur	NE-6 (Rangpur-cum-Mymensingh)	Council Muslim League	Mohammad Abul Quasem
Rajshahi	Dinajpur	NE-7 (Dinajpur-I)	Convention Muslim League	Nurul Huq Choudhury
Rajshahi	Dinajpur	NE-8 (Dinajpur-II)	Awami League	Muhammad Yusuf Ali
Rajshahi	Dinajpur	NE-9 (Dinajpur-cum-Bogra)	Convention Muslim League	Nural Hoda Choudhury
Rajshahi	Bogra	NE-10 (Bogra-I)	Convention Muslim League	Habibur Rahman
Rajshahi	Bogra	NE-11 (Bogra-II)	Convention Muslim League	Habibur Rahman
Rajshahi	Rajshahi	NE-12 (Rajshahi-I)	National Awami Party	Majibur Rahman Chowdhury
Rajshahi	Rajshahi	NE-13 (Rajshahi-II)	Independent	Mahtabuddin Sarker
Rajshahi	Rajshahi	NE-14 (Rajshahi-III)	Awami League	Abul Hasanat Qamaruzzaman
Rajshahi	Rajshahi	NE-15 (Rajshahi-IV)	Convention Muslim League	Kazi Abdul Majid
Rajshahi	Pabna	NE-16 (Pabna-I)	Independent	Asghar Hossain Zaidi
Rajshahi	Pabna	NE-17 (Pabna-II)	Convention Muslim League	Abdullah al Mahmood
Rajshahi	Pabna	NE-18 (Pabna-III)	Convention Muslim League	Mohammed Abdul Matin
Khulna	Bakerganj	NE-19 (Bakerganj-I)	Convention Muslim League	Shah Nazibul Huq
Khulna	Bakerganj	NE-20 (Bakerganj-II)	National Democratic Front	Khan Fazle Rub Chowdhury
Khulna	Bakerganj	NE-21 (Bakerganj-III)	Convention Muslim League	Abdul Jabbar Khan
Khulna	Bakerganj	NE-22 (Bakerganj-IV)	Convention Muslim League	Master Abdul Aziz
Khulna	Bakerganj	NE-23 (Bakerganj-V)	Independent	Ismail Khan
Khulna	Bakerganj	NE-24 (Bakerganj-VI)	Convention Muslim League	Nurul Islam Sikder
Khulna	Bakerganj	NE-25 (Bakerganj-cum-Khulna)	Convention Muslim League	Athar Ali Khan
Khulna	Khulna	NE-26 (Khulna-I)	Convention Muslim League	Hemayetuddin Ahmed
Khulna	Khulna	NE-27 (Khulna-II)	Convention Muslim League	S.M.A. Majeed
Khulna	Khulna	NE-28 (Khulna-III)	Convention Muslim League	Md. Abdul Gafur
Khulna	Jessore	NE-29 (Jessore-I)	Convention Muslim League	Altaf Hossain Sikdar
Khulna	Jessore	NE-30 (Jessore-II)	Convention Muslim League	Ahmed Ali Sardar
Khulna	Jessore	NE-31 (Jessore-III)	Convention Muslim League	Mobarak Ali
Khulna	Jessore	NE-32 (Jessore-cum-Kushtia)	Convention Muslim League	Mian Mansur Ali
Khulna	Kushtia	NE-33 (Kushtia-I)	Awami League	Shah Azizur Rahman
Dacca	Faridpur	NE-34 (Faridpur-I)	Convention Muslim League	Chowdhury Abd-Allah Zaheeruddin
Dacca	Faridpur	NE-35 (Faridpur-II)	National Democratic Front	Dudu Miyan II
Dacca	Faridpur	NE-36 (Faridpur-III)	Convention Muslim League	Abdur Rahman Bakaul
Dacca	Faridpur	NE-37 (Faridpur-IV)	Convention Muslim League	Wahid-uz-Zaman
Dacca	Faridpur	NE-38 (Faridpur-cum-Dacca)	Convention Muslim League	A.B.M. Nurul Islam
Dacca	Dacca	NE-39 (Dacca-I)	Convention Muslim League	A. H. M. Shamsud Doha (until May 1966) Mahtab Uddin Ahmad
Dacca	Dacca	NE-40 (Dacca-II)	Convention Muslim League	Abdur Rouf Khan
Dacca	Dacca	NE-41 (Dacca-III)	Convention Muslim League	N.A. Lashkar
Dacca	Dacca	NE-42 (Dacca-IV)	Council Muslim League	Khwaja Khairuddin
Dacca	Dacca	NE-43 (Dacca-V)	Convention Muslim League	Abdul Awal
Dacca	Dacca	NE-44 (Dacca-VI)	National Democratic Front	A.S.M. Sulaiman
Dacca	Dacca	NE-45 (Dacca-VII)	Convention Muslim League	Mohammad Shahidullah
Dacca	Mymensingh	NE-46 (Mymensingh-I)	Independent	Abdul Alim Al-Razi
Dacca	Mymensingh	NE-47 (Mymensingh-II)	Independent	Afazuddin Faqir
Dacca	Mymensingh	NE-48 (Mymensingh-III)	Convention Muslim League	Raisud-Din Ahmed
Dacca	Mymensingh	NE-49 (Mymensingh-IV)	Convention Muslim League	Sharafat Uddin Ahmad
Dacca	Mymensingh	NE-50 (Mymensingh-V)	Convention Muslim League	Fakhruddin Ahmed
Dacca	Mymensingh	NE-51 (Mymensingh-VI)	Convention Muslim League	Aftab Uddin Chowdhury
Dacca	Mymensingh	NE-52 (Mymensingh-VII)	National Democratic Front	Nurul Amin
Dacca	Mymensingh	NE-53 (Mymensingh-VIII)	Council Muslim League	Mukhlesuzzaman Khan
Dacca	Mymensingh	NE-54 (Mymensingh-IX)	Convention Muslim League	Abdul Ali Menu Miah
Dacca	Mymensingh	NE-55 (Mymensingh-X)	Convention Muslim League	Khurshed Ahmed Khan
Chittagong	Sylhet	NE-56 (Sylhet-I)	National Democratic Front	Mahmud Ali
Chittagong	Sylhet	NE-57 (Sylhet-II)	Independent	Ajmal Ali Choudhury
Chittagong	Sylhet	NE-58 (Sylhet-III)	Convention Muslim League	Md. Keramat Ali
Chittagong	Sylhet	NE-59 (Sylhet-IV)	Convention Muslim League	M. Eahia Khan Choudhury
Chittagong	Sylhet	NE-60 (Sylhet-V)	Convention Muslim League	Moazzem Ahmed Chowdhury
Chittagong	Comilla	NE-61 (Comilla-I)	Convention Muslim League	Azizur Rahman Mollah
Chittagong	Comilla	NE-62 (Comilla-II)	Convention Muslim League	Azizur Rahman
Chittagong	Comilla	NE-63 (Comilla-III)	Convention Muslim League	Abdul Awal Bhuiya
Chittagong	Comilla	NE-64 (Comilla-IV)	Convention Muslim League	A. T. M. Abdul Mateen
Chittagong	Comilla	NE-65 (Comilla-V)	Awami League	Mizanur Rahman Chowdhury
Chittagong	Comilla	NE-66 (Comilla-VI)	Convention Muslim League	Sajedul Hoque Mukhter
Chittagong	Comilla	NE-67 (Comilla-cum-Noakhali)	Independent	Aminul Islam Chowdhury
Chittagong	Noakhali	NE-68 (Noakhali-I)	Independent	Rahimullah Choudhury
Chittagong	Noakhali	NE-69 (Noakhali-II)	Convention Muslim League	Moulvi Ruhul Amin
Chittagong	Noakhali	NE-70 (Noakhali-III)	Convention Muslim League	Mawlana Abdul Hai
Chittagong	Chittagong	NE-71 (Chittagong-I)	Convention Muslim League	Moulvi Sultan Ahmed
Chittagong	Chittagong	NE-72 (Chittagong-II)	Convention Muslim League	A. K. M. Fazlul Quader Chowdhury
Chittagong	Chittagong	NE-73 (Chittagong-III)	Convention Muslim League	Serajul Islam Chowdhury
Chittagong	Chittagong	NE-74 (Chittagong-IV)	Convention Muslim League	Yar Ali Khan
Chittagong	Chittagong	NE-75 (Chittagong-cum-Hill Tracts)	Convention Muslim League	Giashuddin Chowdhury

=== Elected members for Reserved Seats for Women ===
Constituency	Party	Member
NE-76 Women's-I		Begum Mariam Hashimuddin
NE-77 Women's-II		Begum Dolly Azad
NE-78 Women's-III		Syeda Razia Faiz

== West Pakistan ==
District	Constituency	Member
Dadu	NW-73 (Dadu)	Abdul Hamid Khan Jatoi
Jhelum-cum-Gujrat	NW-22 (Jhelum-cum-Gujrat)	Afzal Mehdi Khan
Sialkot	NW-47 (Sialkot-II)	Chaudhury Ahmad Khan Ghuman
Karachi	NW-1 (Karachi-I)	A.K. Soomar
Sheikhupura	NW-43 (Sheikhupura-II)	Bashir Ahmed Khan
Lyallpur	NW-33 (Lyallpur-IV)	Vacant
Hazara	NW-14 (Hazara-II)	Gohar Ayub Khan
Gujranwala	NW-44 (Gujranwala-I)	Jalil Ahmed Khan
Sheikhupura	NW-42 (Sheikhupura-I)	Chaudhry Muhammad Iqbal
Sialkot	NW-48 (Sialkot-III)	Chaudhury Abdur Rahim
Karachi	NW-3 (Karachi-III)	Khalid Jamil
Lyallpur	NW-31 (Lyallpur-II)	Ishaq Cheema
Lyallpur	NW-34 (Lyallpur-V)	Chaudhry Sultan Ahmad
Montgomery	NW-60 (Montgomery-IV)	Diwan Ghulam Qutub Din
Gujrat	NW-24 (Gujrat-I)	Fazal Elahi Chaudhry
Peshawar	NW-10 (Peshawar-I)	Fida Mohammad Khan
Muzaffargarh	NW-55 (Muzaffargarh-II)	Ghulam Mohammad Mustafa
Nawab Shah	NW-66 (Nawab Shah)	Ghulam Mustafa Khan Jatoi
Tharparkar	NW-75 (Tharparkar)	Ghulam Muhammad Wasan
Gujrat	NW-25 (Gujrat-II)	Ghulam Rasul
Karachi	NW-2 (Karachi-II)	Hasan A. Shaikh
Sargodha	NW-27 (Sargodha-I)	Khuda Dad Khan
Lyallpur	NW-32 (Lyallpur-III)	Mohammad Saleem Khan
Karachi-cum-Lasbela	NW-4 (Karachi-cum-Lasbela)	Vacant
Peshawar Agency	NW-18 (Peshawar Agency-II)	Major-General Mohammad Shah Khisro
Lahore	NW-40 (Lahore-III)	Major Zulfiqar Ali Khan Qizilbash
Peshawar Agency	NW-17 (Peshawar Agency-I)	Malik Ali Man Shah
Campbellpur	NW-26 (Campbellpur-I)	Malik Allah Yar Khan
Bannu	NW-8 (Bannu)	Malik Damsaz Khan
D.I. Khan Agency	NW-9 (D.I. Khan Agency)	Malik Darya Khan Wazir Madi Khel Tori Khel
Sargodha	NW-29 (Sargodha-III)	Malik Muhammad Anwar Khan
Hyderabad	NW-70 (Hyderabad-I)	Makhdum Muhammad Zaman Talibul Maula
Rahimyar Khan	MW-64 (Rahimyar Khan)	Ghulam Miran Gilani
Multan	NW-53 (Multan-V)	Makhdumzada Syed Hamid Raza Gilani
Montgomery	NW-57 (Montgomery-I)	Mian Abdul Haque
Lahore	NW-39 (Lahore-II)	Mian Arif Iftikhar
Peshawar Agency	NW-19 (Peshawar Agency-III)	Miangul Aurangzeb
Muzaffargarh	NW-34 (Muzaffargarh-I)	Mian Muzaffar Mehdi Hashmi
Lyallpur	NW-30 (Lyallpur-I)	Rafique Saigol
Lahore	NW-38 (Lahore-I)	Mian Salah-ud-Din
Hyderabad	NW-71 (Hyderabad-II)	Mir Aijaz Ali Talpur
Quetta	NW-68 (Quetta)	Mir Darya Khan Khoso
Quetta	NW-66 (Quetta)	Mir Nabi Bakhsh Zehri
Rawalpindi	NW-21 (Rawalpindi-II)	Muhammad Ashraf Raja
Hazara	NW-15 (Hazara-II)	Ayub Khan
Hazar-cum-Mardan-cum-Malakand	NW-13 (Hazar-cum-Mardan-cum-Malakand)	Mohammad Haneef Khan
Bahawalnagar	NW-63 (Bahawalnagar)	Muhammad Qasim Malik
Multan	NW-50 (Multan-II)	Akram Khan Bosan
Gujranwala	NW-45 (Gujranwala-II)	Muhammad Irshad Ullah
Multan	NW-49 (Multan-I)	Muhammad Sajjad Hussain Makhdoom
Multan	NW-52 (Multan-IV)	Muhammad Nawaz Khan Khichi
Larkana	NW-67 (Larkana)	Mumtaz Ali Bhutto
Mianwali	NW-37 (Mianwali)	Malik Muzaffar Khan
Montgomery	NW-58 (Montgomery-III)	Malik Nur Mohammad Khokhar
Peshawar	NW-11 (Peshawar-II)	Mian Jamal Shah
Mardan	NW-12 (Mardan)	Nawabzada Abdul Ghafoor Khan
Kohat	NW-16 (Kohat)	Nawabzsada Azmat Ali Khan
Sanghar-cum-Tharparkar	NW-74 (Sanghar-cum-Tharparkar)	Nawab Jam Sadik Ali
Jhang	NW-35 (Jhang-I)	Niwazish Ali Khan
Sargodha	NW-28 (Sargodha-II)	Noor Hayat Khan Noon
Khairpur-cum-Sukkur	NW-65 (Khairpur-cum-Sukkur)	Pir Syed Nadir Ali Shah Rashdie
Multan	NW-51 (Multan-III)	Qamar-uz-Zaman Shah
Montgomery	NW-58 (Montgomery-II)	Rana Ghulam Sabir Khan
Lahore	NW-41 (Lahore-IV)	Sardar Abdul Hamid
Kalat	NW-5 (Kalat)	Doda Khan Zarakzai
Jhang	NW-36 (Jhang-II)	Ghulam Muhammad Shah
Thatta	NW-74 (Thatta)	Zadikali A. Memon
Bahawalpur-cum-Rahimyar Khan	NW-62 (Bahawalpur-cum-Rahimyar Khan)	Mohammad Abbas Abbasi
D.I. Khan	NW-7 (D.I. Khan)	Fazal Karim Khan
Sukkur	NW-69 (Sukkur)	Ghulam Muhammad Mahar
Campbellpur-cum-Jhelum	NW-23 (Campbellpur-cum-Jhelum)	Sardar Khizer Hayat Khan
D.G.Khan	NW-56 (D.G.Khan)	Sardar Mahmood Khan Leghari
Bahawalpur-cum-Bahawalnagar	NW-61 (Bahawalpur-cum-Bahawalnagar)	Sardar Mohammad Aslam Khan
Sialkot	NW-46 (Sialkot-I)	S. Murid Hussain
Rawalpindi	NW-20 (Rawalpindi-I)	Syed Ali Asghar Shah

=== Elected members for Reserved Seats for Women ===
Constituency	Member
NW-76 Women's-I	Begum Jujeebun-nisa Mohammad Akram
NW-77 Women's-II	Begum Khudeja Khan
NW-78 Women's-III	Begum Zari Sarfraz

== Changes to Members of Fourth Constitutional Assembly ==
=== East Pakistan ===
1. Sultan Ali, February, 1966
2. Adeluddin Ahmad Howladar, October, 1967
3. Farid Ahmad, October, 1967

=== West Pakistan ===
1. Ghause Baksh, February, 1966
2. Mohammad Iqbal Malik, August, 1966
3. Muazzam Hussain Khan, March, 1967
4. Raja Lehrasib Khan, March, 1967
5. Nadir Khan Malik, October, 1967
6. Khan Nasrullah Khan, October, 1967
7. Mohammad Amir Khan, October, 1967
