= Sikdar =

Sikdar, Sikder, Sikidar or Shikdar is a common Bengali Hindu surname, as well as a Muslim surname notable in Bangladesh, West Bengal and Assam. Amongst the Hindus, majority of them are Kayastha and some are Brahmins. Sikdar means owner of one siki (one hundred quarter) of land. In small rural communities, they served as representatives of the Zamindar who used to allocate land and were authorized to settle disputes, collecting taxes and ensuring law enforcement. The British bestowed this title to the appointed officers.

== Notable people with surname Sikdar ==
- Abbas Ullah Shikder (1955–2020), Bangladeshi producer, actor and politician
- Abdul Hye Sikder (born 1957), Bangladeshi poet
- Abdul Mannan Sikder (born 1931), Bangladeshi politician
- Abdul Quader Sikder (1956–2021), Bangladeshi politician
- Abul Basar Sikder, Bangladeshi politician
- Altaf Hossain Sikdar, Bangladeshi politician
- Anwar Uddin Shikdar, Bangladeshi politician
- Asmat Ali Sikder (1939–2001), Bangladeshi lawyer and politician
- Jakir Hussain Sikdar (born 1981), Assam politician
- Nurul Islam Sikder, Bangladeshi politician
- Sadat Ali Sikder (died 2017), Bangladeshi politician
- Shamim Sikder (1952–2023), Bangladeshi sculptor
- Shamsuddin Sikder, Bangladeshi politician
- Sikdar Aminul Haq (1942–2003), Bangladeshi poet
- Sikder Group family:
  - Zainul Haque Sikder (1930–2021), Bangladeshi businessman
  - Parveen Haque Sikder (born 1963), Bangladeshi politician
- Radhanath Sikdar, Indian mathematician, calculated the height of Peak XV in the Himalayas which was later named Mount Everest
- Jyotirmoyee Sikdar, Indian athlete and politician
- Sutapa Sikdar, Hindi film screenwriter
- Tapan Sikdar, former Union minister of state in the National Democratic Alliance government
- Siraj Sikder, Bangladeshi revolutionary politician
- Ershad Sikdar, Bangladeshi criminal and serial killer

== See also ==
- Sikder Group, business conglomerate
