= Abdul Awwal =

ʻAbd al-Awwal is a Bengali masculine given name. It is built from the Arabic words ʻabd and al-Awwal, one of the names of God in the Qur'an, which give rise to the Muslim theophoric names. Notable people with this name include:

- Abdul Awal (Pakistani politician), Pakistani-Bengali politician
- Abdul Awal Bhuiya, Pakistani-Bengali parliamentary secretary for Foreign Affairs
- Abdul Awwal Jaunpuri (1867–1921), Islamic scholar and author
- Abdul Awal Khan, Bengali politician from Rangpur
- Abdul Awal Mia, Bangladeshi politician
- Mohammed Abdul Awal Narayanganji, Bangladeshi politician
- Abdul Awal Mintoo (born 1949), Bangladeshi businessman
- A. K. Mohammad Abdul Awal Firozpuri (born 1954), Bangladeshi politician
- Mohammad Abdul Awal Chandpuri (born 1968), secretary-general of the Bangladesh Tarikat Federation
- Abdul Awal Sarkar (died 1999), Bangladeshi freedom fighter

== See also ==
- Awaluddin
