= Ismail Khan (disambiguation) =

Ismail Khan may refer to:

People

- Ismail Khan (born 1946), Afghan former military officer, warlord and politician
- Ismail Khan of Bengal C16th nobleman of the Sultanate of Bengal
- Ismail Khan (fighter) (born 2002), Pakistani professional mixed martial artist
- Ismail Khan (Moghul khan) Khan of Yarkand and Kashgar, 1666–1669 and 1670–1680.
- Ismail Khan (Pakistani politician) East Pakistani representative to the 4th National Assembly of Pakistan 1965–1969
- Ismail Khan, lead vocalist, poet and composer of Ismail and Junaid a Pashto musical duo

Places

- Ismail Khan Castle, historical castle located in Ilam County, Iran
