= Syed Azizur Rahman =

Bengali politician

- সৈয়দ আজিজুর রহমান

Chief Whip of the East Bengal Legislative Assembly

Member of the Bengal Legislative Assembly
- In office 1946–1947
- Preceded by: Tofayel Ahmed Chowdhury
- Succeeded by: Assembly disbanded
- Constituency: Bhola South

Personal details
- Born: 1901 Batamara, Bhola Island, Backergunge District, Bengal
- Died: 1956 (aged 54–55)
- Party: Muslim League
- Relatives: Razia Banu (sister-in-law)

Syed Azizur Rahman (Bengali: সৈয়দ আজিজুর রহমান; 1901–1956), also known by his daak naam Nawab Mia (Bengali: নওয়াব মিঞা), was a Bengali politician and a former whip of the East Bengal Legislative Assembly.

== Early life and education ==
Azizur Rahman was born in 1901 to an aristocratic Bengali Muslim zamindar family in Batamara in Bhola Island, which was then a part of the Backergunge District of the Bengal Presidency. The zamindari was established by his grandfather, Syed Turab Ali, after initially being gifted 360 acres of land in Bhola by Kalaraja, a zamindar of Ulania. Ali was originally from Jaunpur, India and associated with its Pir family but was stationed as a police constable in the greater Barisal region. Azizur Rahman's father, Syed Altafur Rahman, died when Azizur Rahman was nine years old. He was then brought up at the Agarpur Miyan Bari in Wazirpur, which was the home of his maternal grandfather. On his mother's side, Azizur Rahman was a descendant of Pathan general Shah Muhammad Ashraf Jahan Khan. He completed his studies at the Brojomohun College in Barisal.

== Career ==
Aged only eighteen, Azizur Rahman began his career at the Bakerganj District Board and served as a member of the local board for three consecutive decades. He contributed to developing the infrastructure of the district and particularly involved in social work. He contested for the Bhola South constituency as a Muslim League politician at the 1937 Bengal Legislative Assembly election, losing to Tofayel Ahmad Chowdhury of the Krishak Praja Party. Azizur Rahman was elected to the Bengal Legislative Assembly as a Muslim League politician for Bhola South constituency after defeating his rival Hashem Ali Khan of the Krishak Praja Party at the 1946 elections. In the same year, he opened a langar khana in his own home, the Batamara Darogah Bari, where he distributed food for one month. Seeing his initiative, the government later opened langar khanas in different parts of the region.

After the Partition of Bengal in 1947, he became a parliamentary secretary. He served as the Chief Whip of the East Bengal Legislative Assembly for seven years.

== Personal life ==
His younger brother, Syed Mahbubur Rahman, was a Bangladesh government secretary and the husband of politician Razia Banu. Azizur Rahman's elder daughter married Captain Kabiruddin Ahmad (former deputy director of ports and shipping, BIWTA), the third son of Khan Bahadur Hemayetuddin Ahmad.

== Death ==
Azizur Rahman died in 1956.
