= Awwal =

Awwal (Arabic: أَوَّل) may refer to "Al-Awwal", one of the names of God in Islam. It may also refer to:

== People ==
- Auwal H Yadudu, Nigerian academic
- Awwal Ibrahim, former Governor of Niger
- Awwal Zubairu Gambo, Chief of Naval Staff in Nigeria
- Awal al-Din, multiple people
- Abdul Awwal, multiple people

== Places ==
- Auwal Mosque in Cape Town, South Africa

== See also ==
- Aval (disambiguation)
- Akhirah, afterlife in Islam
- Awwal Number, a 1990 Indian film
