= Syed Habibul Haque =

Bangladeshi politician

Member of 3rd National Assembly of Pakistan
- In office 1962–1965
- Succeeded by: Sajedul Hoque Mukhter
- Constituency: Comilla-VI

Member of 2nd Jatiya Sangsad
- In office 18 February 1979 – 1979
- Preceded by: Kazi Zahirul Qayyum
- Succeeded by: Omar Ahmed Majumder
- Constituency: Comilla-17

Personal details
- Died: 1979
- Political party: Bangladesh Nationalist Party
- Relatives: Nawab Faizunnesa

Syed Mohammad Habibul Haque (Bengali: সৈয়দ হাবিবুল হক) was a Bangladesh Nationalist Party politician and a member of parliament for Comilla-17.

== Early life and education ==
Habibul Haque studied law, and became a qualified barrister.

== Career ==
Habibul Haque was elected to the 3rd National Assembly of Pakistan in 1962, representing the Comilla-VI (Laksam) constituency. In 1979, he was elected to the second Jatiya Sangsad as a Bangladesh Nationalist Party candidate from the Comilla-17 constituency. Habibul Haque died that same year.
