= Afzal Mehdi Khan =

Pakistani politician

Member of 3rd National Assembly of Pakistan
- In office June 1962 – 1965

Afzal Mehdi Khan (1928–1966) was a Pakistani politician from Jhelum. He was a member of the 3rd National Assembly of Pakistan during 1962-65 and a member of the 4th National Assembly of Pakistan during 1965-66. He was father of Pakistani MNA Malik Iqbal Mehdi Khan and MPA Raheela Anwar. Afzal died while in office.

== Political career ==
- In 1962 election, he was elected as member national assembly from NW- 21 (Jhelum- I) constituency.
- In 1965 election, he was elected as member national assembly from NW- 22 (Jhelum-cum-Gujrat) constituency.
