= Shah Azizur Rahman (disambiguation) =

Shah Azizur Rahman (1925–1989) was a Bangladeshi politician who served as the Prime Minister of Bangladesh.

Shah Azizur Rahman may also refer to

- Shah Azizur Rahman (1925–1989), Prime Minister of Bangladesh
- Shah Azizur Rahman (politician) (died 2018), Bangladesh Awami League politician and former Member of Parliament from Sylhet-2

== See also ==
- Azizur Rahman (disambiguation)
