= Razia Banu =

Bangladeshi politician

- রাজিয়া বানু

Member of the Bangladesh Parliament for Reserved Women's Seat-4
- In office 7 March 1973 – 6 November 1976
- Preceded by: Position created

Personal details
- Born: 24 June 1926
- Died: 10 May 1998 (aged 71)
- Party: Awami League
- Relatives: A. K. Fazlul Huq (grandfather); A. K. Faezul Huq (uncle)

Razia Banu (24 June 1926 – 10 May 1998) was an Awami League politician in Bangladesh and a former member of the Bangladesh Parliament in a seat reserved for women.

== Early life and family ==
Razia Banu was born in the District of Dacca in the erstwhile Bengal Presidency to a Bengali Muslim family. Her father, Wazir Ali, son of Baiyam Mia, was the first Bengali Muslim SDO. Her mother, Nafisa Bibi, was the daughter of A. K. Fazlul Huq, the first prime minister of Bengal, and the sister of Bangladeshi politician A. K. Faezul Huq.

== Career ==
In 1954, Banu was elected to the East Bengal Legislative Assembly. After the independence of Bangladesh, she was elected to the first Jatiya Sangsad from a seat reserved for women as an Awami League candidate in 1973.

== Personal life ==
Banu was married to Syed Mahbubur Rahman, a Bangladesh government secretary from Batamara in Bhola.
