= Muminunnisa Government Mohila College =

Government women's college in Mymensingh, Bangladesh

Coordinates: 24.762928°N 90.397647°E

- মুমিনুন্নিসা সরকারি মহিলা কলেজ
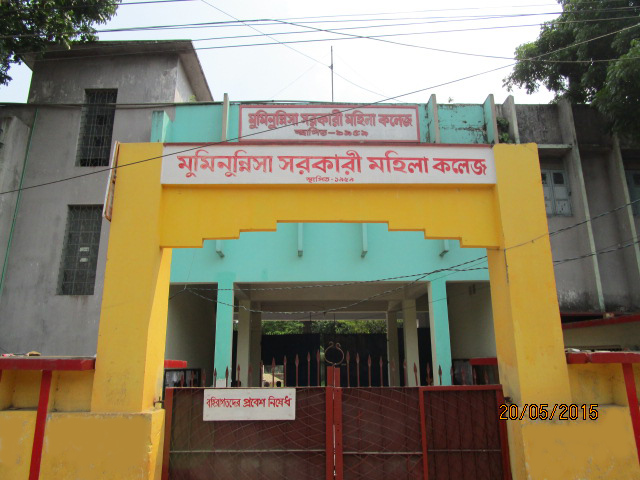
- The front gate of Muminunnisa Government Mohila College
- Type: Government Women's college
- Established: 29 July 1959
- Affiliations: National University, Bangladesh
- Principal: Dr. Maleka Bilkis
- Location: 9 Khitish Chandra Roy Road, Mymensingh - 2200, Bangladesh
- Campus: Urban
- HSC Board: Board of Intermediate and Secondary Education, Mymensingh
- Website: mugmc.edu.bd

Muminunnisa Government Mohila College or Muminunnesa College in short, is a women's public college located opposite Town Hall of Mymensingh near the Brahmaputra River in Bangladesh.

== History ==
It was established in 1959 and was named after Muminunnesa Khan, mother of a businessman M. R. Khan. Initially established as a private college. Renowned social reformer M.R. Khan donated the land and major portion of the finance and helped develop the infrastructure of the college with a view to establishing the college after the name of his mother Muminunnisa. The then Director of Mass Education Mr. Md. Shamsul Haq inaugurated the college on July 29, 1959. The Founder-Principal of the college was educationist Alhaj Reazuddin Ahmed. Science group started in the H.S class in 1961. The college was upgraded to a Degree college in 1963. In March 1980, the college was nationalized. Honours courses in six disciplines were introduced from the academic session 1998-99 under National University, Gazipur. And Masters Final course was introduced from 2001 to 2002. Honours courses in three more subjects were introduced in 2006–2007. Honours courses in Botany and Zoology were introduced in the session 2012-2013 and 2014-2015 respectively.

== Degree ==
It offers undergraduate and post-graduate courses in different faculties including Humanities and Science. It has a halls of residence within the campus. The college uniform is a red vest with white shorts or skirts and white socks and shoes.

== Alumni ==
Bangladeshi writer and publisher Iffat Ara graduated with a Bachelor of Arts from the college in 1968. Nazmun Ara Sultana completed her HSC exam at the college in 1967. Also educationist Maliha Khatun served in this college as its principal for a long time.

In June 2007 the Muminunnesa Women's College debating team was declared the winner at a national Debate Workshop conducted by the Mymensingh Debate Federation.

== See also ==
- Ananda Mohan College
- Nasirabad College, Mymensingh
- Pakundia Adarsha Mohila College
