= Shah Nazibul Huq =

Pakistani politician

Advocate Alhaj Shah Najibul Huq
- শাহ নজিবুল হক

Member of the National Assembly of Pakistan
- In office 1965–1969
- Preceded by: Abdul Hye Choudhury
- Constituency: NE-19 (Bakerganj-I)

Personal details
- Born: 1906 Syed Auliya, Bhola Island, Bengal Presidency
- Party: Muslim League
- Education: University of Calcutta

Shah Nazibul Huq (Bengali: শাহ নজিবুল হক; 1906–1996) was a Bengali lawyer, politician and philanthropist. He was a member of the 4th National Assembly of Pakistan. His social service and philanthropy are comparable to Muhammad Mohsin of the contemporary era.

== Early life and family ==
Huq was born in 1906 to a Bengali family of Sufi Muslims in the village of Syed Auliya in Burhanuddin subdivision, South Shahbazpur (Bhola Island), off the coast of the Backergunge District. His father, Shah Mohammad Khalilur Rahman, was a teacher and philanthropist. At the age of merely 15 years, Huq completed his matriculation from the Hatiya High School on Hatiya Island. He then travelled to Calcutta, where he graduated from the University of Calcutta with a Bachelor of Laws.

== Career ==
Huq began his career as a lawyer. He got the opportunity of government job but did not accept it for direct service of humanity. Huq returned to South Shahbazpur as a lawyer in 1936 and was a secretary for the Land Mortgage Bank. He later joined the Barisal Bar Association. The Barisal Bar Association felicitated Shah Najibul Haque on his 50th anniversary in the legal profession. He was also a member of the Barisal Municipality.

He was elected to the National Assembly of Pakistan from Bakerganj-I in 1965. As a representative of the Government of Pakistan, he visited Malaysia, Indonesia, Saudi Arabia and other countries as a delegate. Through his efforts, the Char Fasson Thana was established. Huq founded several educational institutions in Bhola and Barisal, and generously donated land and a lot of money. Among his contributions are the Mirzakalu High School, Mirzakalu Senior Madrasa, Bhola Sadar Girls High School, A. K. High School, Town High School, Natullabad Madrasa. Since 1966, he served as the president of Barisal's largest central congregational mosque, the Koshai Masjid. Huq was also a founding member of the committees for Bhola College, Char Fasson College, Lalmohan College and Syed Hatem Ali College. He served as the secretary of the Barisal Hussainia Madrasa for 25 years before becoming its vice-president and funded heavily to the mosque, madrasa and club. Huq has given financial assistance and bought books and clothes to many poor boys and girls for their education. He participated in the Bengali language movement, Bangladesh Liberation War and the 1990 Mass Uprising. When Abdur Rahman Biswas visited Barisal during his presidency, there was a conflict over who would give him flower garlands at his reception. Ultimately, Huq was the one who presented the garland to him.

== Death ==
Huq died in Bangladesh.
