= Iffat Ara =

Bangladeshi novelist

- ইফ্‌ফাত আরা
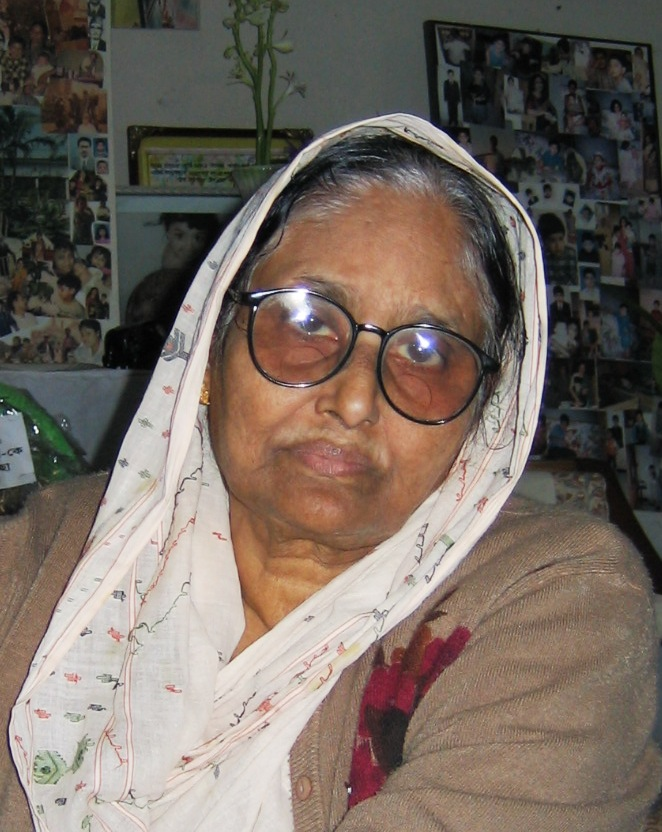
- Ara in 2006
- Born: 1939 (age 86–87); Kishoreganj, Bengal Province, British India
- Occupation: Writer
- Spouse: Abdul Latif Talukder
- Children: 4
- Parents: Quazi Abdul Hakim (father); Hajera Khatun (mother)

Shamsun Nahar Iffat Ara (born 1939; known as Iffat Ara) is a Bangladeshi writer, social activist and literary organizer. Her literary career began in the late 1950s when she started to write short stories and publish them in the leading newspaper of the country including the Azad.

== Early life and education ==
Iffat Ara was born to Maulavi Quazi Abdul Hakim and Mosammat Hajera Khatun in Kishoreganj in 1939. She struggled hard for formal education, first learning Arabic at home to be able to read the Quran. She then went to Muslim Girls' School for primary education. After her primary education was over, her father withdrew her from the school since, at that time, higher education for girls was not considered necessary. Desperate to continue education, she threatened to commit suicide and was subsequently admitted to the Vidyamoyee Govt. Girls' High School of the town. But before she could complete the high school she was married to Abdul Latif Talukder, a young lawyer and politician. She then passed the matriculation examination and, later, the intermediate exam from the Muminunnesa Women's College. In 1966, she graduated from the same college and proceeded to study for B. Ed. at the Mymensingh Women's Teachers Training College. When Ananda Mohan College was upgraded to a university-college, she earned her master's in Bengali language and literature in 1973.

== Women's movements ==
Women's movements in Mymensingh could not be thought of without the active presence of Ara since the 1960s. She became involved in social welfare activities for women with her membership of All Pakistan Women's Association in 1966. After birth of Bangladesh in 1971, she, in association with others like author Helena Khan, Sufia Karim and politician Begum Mariam Hashimuddin took initiative to set up Mahila Samity (tr. Women's Association). Later she organized the Mymensingh chapter of the Bangladesh Jatiya Mahila Sangstha, an organization sponsored by the government. She contributed substantially in establishing Udayan High School in Mymensingh in 1988. Since her marriage she was in touch with politics but never opted for joining politics.

== Career ==
In 1968, Ara joined Nasirabad Girls' School as an assistant teacher and retired from there as its headmistress in 1972. Later she took up the job of feature editor for the women's page of the weekly Banglar Darpan published from Mymensingh. When the same establishment started to publish a monthly women's magazine, titled Chandrakash, in 1973, Iffat Ara was appointed its editor. She worked as editor of Chandrakash till 1979.

== Publications ==
Ara has published nine titles to her credit. They include novels, a collection of short stories, a book of knowledge for children and essays. She also edited Bangladesher Jonopriyo Kavita (tr. Popular poems from Bangladesh), a collection of Bengali poems since the late 18th century. Her unique book of knowledge for high school goers Shona achey jana nai was highly acclaimed and has gone through many editions since 1990. Her novel Sukh jakhan shesh belay was published in 2000. Currently she is working on a book of short stories for young readers.

=== Dwitiyo Chinta ===
Ara set up a press in her house and started to publish a literary monthly magazine Chinta in 1986. Later it was renamed Dwitiyo Chinta in 1988. Soon Iffat Mansion, her residence in Mymensingh town since 1960, from where she published her magazine, became a hub of literary activities. The poet Jibanananda Das birth centenary edition of the Dwitiyo Chinta, brought out in 1999, remains an example of high quality editing and planning of a commemorative issue of a magazine. Dwitiyo Chinta has published writings of many eminent writers and poets of the country in addition to regional writers.

== Personal life ==
Ara has three sons and a daughter. The daughter is an economics professor at Muminunnesa Govt. Women's College in Mymensingh.
