= Abdul Gafur =

Abdul Gafur, Abdul Gaffoor, or similar may refer to:

== People ==
- Abdul Gafur Hali (1929–2016), Bangladeshi folk lyricist, composer and singer
- Abdul Gafur (language activist) (1929–2024), Bangladeshi journalist, teacher, writer and language activist
- Abdul Gafur (Bangladeshi politician), Member of Parliament for Kushtia-2
- Abdul Gafur Bhuiyan, Bangladeshi politician
- Muhammad Abdul Gafur, Bangladeshi politician
- Md. Abdul Gafur, East Pakistan politician

== Other uses ==
- Masjid Abdul Gaffoor, a mosque in Little India, Singapore
