= Muhammad Shehabulah =

Pakistani politician

Muhammad Shehabulah was a member of the 3rd National Assembly of Pakistan as a representative of East Pakistan.

== Career ==
Shehabulah received a Bachelor of Commerce, a Bachelor of Laws, and a Master of Arts. He was a member of the 3rd National Assembly of Pakistan representing the Noakhali-I constituency.
