= Mahbubul Huq =

Pakistani politician

- মাহবুবুল হক
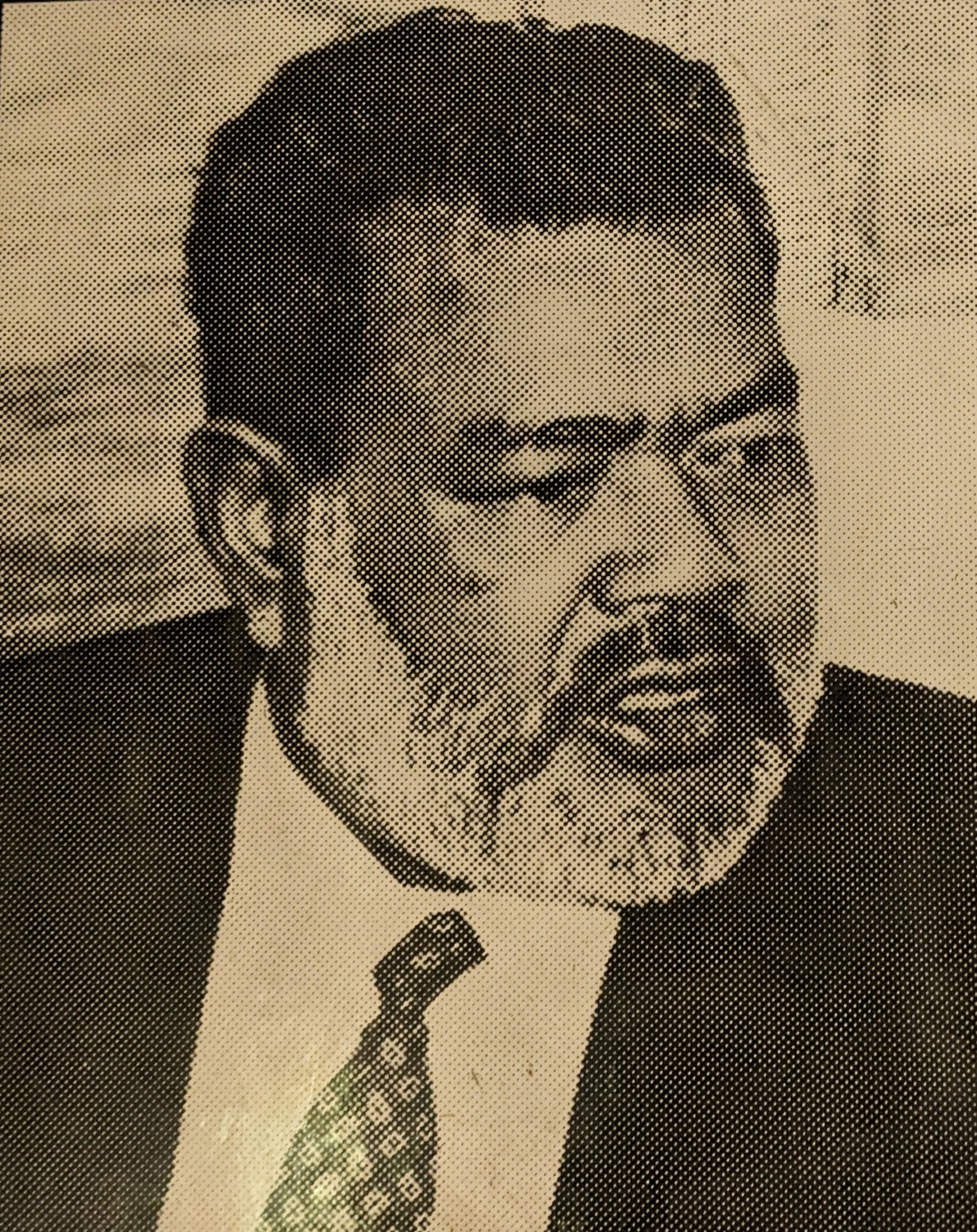

Member of Parliament for NE-67 (Comilla-cum-Noakhali)
- In office 8 June 1962 – 1964
- Succeeded by: Aminul Islam Chowdhury

Personal details
- Born: c. 1923 Farhadnagar, Feni, Bengal Presidency, British India
- Died: 5 June 1974 (aged 50–51)

Mahbubul Huq (c. 1923 – 5 June 1974) was a member of the 3rd National Assembly of Pakistan as a representative of representing Comilla-cum-Noakhali in East Pakistan.

== Background ==
Huq was born at Farhadnagar, Feni in the then Bengal Presidency, British India.

== Career ==
Huq was a member of an Inquiry Commission led by Abdul Jabbar Khan to investigate Muslims evicted from Tripura and Assam and forced into East Pakistan.

In 1945, at the age of 22, Huq joined the trade union of Bengal Assam Railway led by Jyoti Basu at Lumding in Assam.

In 1948, Huq became the General Secretary of East Pakistan Railway Employees League (EPREL) as A. K. Fazlul Huq's running mate.

In 1952, Huq was honored by Industrial Tribunal formed by the Government of Pakistan to represent EPREL in place of Barrister Hamidul Huq Choudhury. EPREL won the tribunal case. He actively participated in the Bengali language movement through EPREL, Weekly Sainik and Tamaddun Majlish.

In 1954, Huq was nominated from the "Haq-Bhashani" Jukto Front for the then Provincial Assembly of East Pakistan.

In 1956, Huq started publishing the Weekly Pallibarta from Feni as Editor. Belal Chowdhury was the acting editor.

In 1958, Huq joined Daily Pakistan Observer as commercial manager and was promoted to managing editor in 1967.

In 1964, Sheikh Mujibur Rahman received Huq after returning from West Pakistan at Dhaka Airport for pro-people activism in the then Pakistan parliament. In 1965, Rahman sponsored Huq for nomination as COP candidate for National Assembly of Pakistan. In 1967, he got elected unopposed President of EPREL and continued till 1971.

In 1969, he started Daily Purbodesh from Observer House, Dhaka. He was the founder editor of Purbadesh, naming the newspaper indicating a pseudo-name for a separate country 'Bangladesh' 1974: Joined Daily Janapad as advisor and continued until his death on 5 June 1974.
