= Muzaffar Rahman Chowdhury =

Mujaffar Rahman Chowdhury

Member of 3rd National Assembly
- In office 8 June 1962 – 7 June 1965
- Preceded by: Constituency established
- Succeeded by: Majibur Rahman Chowdhury
- Constituency: Rajshahi-I

Muzaffar Rahman Chowdhury was a Member of the 3rd National Assembly of Pakistan as a representative of East Pakistan.

== Career ==
Chowdhury was a Member of the 3rd National Assembly of Pakistan representing Rajshahi-I.
