= Zainul Haque Sikder =

Bangladeshi businessman (1930–2021)

Zainul Haque Sikder (12 August 1930 – 10 February 2021) was a Bangladeshi businessman and the founder of Sikder Group. He was the chairman of National Bank Limited, Sikder Real Estate Limited, Sikder Pharma, Monowara Sikder Medical College and Hospital, Z. H. Sikder Women's Medical College & Hospital, and Z. H. Sikder University of Science and Technology. He was also the owner of english newspaper, Bangladesh Post. He was also the owner of Power Pack Economic Zone, Power Pack Holdings, Power Pack Ports, and Sikder Insurance.

== Early life ==
Sikder was born on 12 August 1930, in Assam, British India. He moved to East Bengal during the Partition of India.

== Career ==
Sikder started his business career in real estate. He founded Sikder Group in the 1950s.

Sikder fought in the Bangladesh Liberation war. After the Assassination of Sheikh Mujibur Rahman in the 15 August 1975 Bangladesh coup d'état, Sikder organised prayers for Sheikh Mujibur Rahman on 19 August 1975. He was arrested and imprisoned because of that.

In 1992, Sikder founded Z.H. Sikder Women's Medical College and Hospital. He founded Abdur Razzak Secondary Girls School in Kodalpur, Bangabandhu High School, Jarina Sikder Girls School And College, Monowara Sikder Girls High School, and Mokfor Uddin National law college.

In 2009, Sikder bought National Bank Limited. He founded Mandy Dental College & Hospital.

In 2018, Sikder had 20 billion taka in outstanding loans from various banks for his businesses under Sikder Group.

Sikder was the chairperson of Koi Resorts, based in the United States, which has a luxury resort in St Kitts and Nevis.

== Personal life ==
Sikder's wife, Monowara Sikder, succeeded him as the chairman of National Bank Limited. They have five sons and three daughters. Sikder's son, Ron Haque Sikder, is the managing director of Sikder Group. Dipu Haque Sikder and Ron Haque Sikder fled Bangladesh on 25 May 2020 after they allegedly tried to force a bank official to provide them a large loan. His other son, Rick Haque Sikder is a director of Sikder Group. His daughter, Parveen Haque Sikder, is a member of parliament from women's reserved seat. His son Nick Haque Sikder is also involved with Sikder Group. His remaining son is Momtazul Haque Sikder and daughters are Lisa Fatema Haque Sikder and Nasim Sikder.

== Death ==
Sikder died on 10 February 2021, while under treatment at Saudi German Hospital in Dubai. He died from COVID-19-related complications. He was buried in Z.H. Sikder Women's Medical College and Hospital near, Gulshan-2, Dhaka.
