= Begum Mariam Hashimuddin =

Begum Mariam Hashimuddin was a Member of the 3rd National Assembly of Pakistan as a representative of East Pakistan.

== Career ==
Hashimuddin was a Member of the 4th National Assembly of Pakistan.

In Bangladesh, she served as the President of Jatiya Mahila Party.
