= Abdul Hamid (Pakistani politician) =

Pakistani politician

Abdul Hamid was a Member of the 3rd National Assembly of Pakistan as a representative of East Pakistan.

== Career ==
Hamid was a Member of the 3rd National Assembly of Pakistan representing Dacca-VII.
