= Md. Abdur Rahman (Mymensingh politician) =

Pakistani politician

Md. Abdur Rahman was a member of the 3rd National Assembly of Pakistan as a representative of East Pakistan.

== Career ==
Rahman was a member of the 3rd National Assembly of Pakistan representing Mymensingh-VI.
