= Asghar Hossain Zaidi =

Pakistani politician

Asghar Hossain Zaidi was a Pakistani politician who was a member of the 4th National Assembly of Pakistan as a representative of East Pakistan.

== Career ==
Zaidi was a Member of the 4th National Assembly of Pakistan representing Pabna-I. He was a Member of the Cabinet of President Ayub Khan. He and his family moved to Pakistan after the Independence of Bangladesh. His daughter, Cilocia Zaidi, is a journalist in Pakistan. His home in Pabna has been made a part of a law college there.
