= Aminul Islam Chowdhury =

Bangladeshi politician (born 1921)

- আমিনুল ইসলাম চৌধুরী

Member of the National Assembly of Pakistan for NE-67 (Comilla-cum-Noakhali)
- In office 1965–1969
- Preceded by: Mahbubul Huq
- Succeeded by: Position abolished

Personal details
- Born: 1921 Alkora, Tippera, British India
- Spouse: Jahanara Begum Chowdhury

Aminul Islam Chowdhury (born 1921) was a Bangladeshi politician and businessman. He was a member of parliament of Pakistan (MNA) before East Pakistan became Bangladesh and represented a region in Comilla.

== Early life and career ==
Chowdhury was born in 1921 in Alkora, Tippera (now Alkara, Comilla District, Bangladesh). He was the son of Serajul Islam Chowdhury, Zamindar of Alkora. He studied economics at the University of Calcutta and graduated in 1943.

He was involved in many industries such as aluminum, deep sea trawler fishing, seafood export etc. and won international awards for outstanding business performance. He was also the founder and chairman of the Chittagong Chamber of Commerce & Industry. Chowdhury created various companies such as Bayview but the most successful were Amin Fish Farms and Industries Limited. Located in Chittagong, the company's factory covers 20,000 square feet (1,900 m^{2}). It has been awarded numerous times for its export performance.

After retirement, he was involved in various organizations such as the Bangladesh Human Rights Commission where he was the chairman for many years.

== Personal life ==
Chowdhury was married to Jahanara Begum Chowdhury and had three daughters, Zakia, Mumtaz and Rebeka.
