= Majibur Rahman Chowdhury =

Member of 4th National Assembly
- In office 12 June 1965 – 25 March 1969
- Preceded by: Muzaffar Rahman Chowdhury
- Succeeded by: Constituency abolished
- Constituency: Rajshahi-I

Majibur Rahman Chowdhury was a Member of the 4th National Assembly of Pakistan as a representative of East Pakistan.

== Career ==
Chowdhury was a Member of the 4th National Assembly of Pakistan representing Rajshahi-I.
