= Mansural Hoq =

Pakistani Politician (Now Bangladesh)

Mansural Hoq was a Member of the 3rd National Assembly of Pakistan as a representative of East Pakistan.

== Career ==
Hoq was a Member of the 3rd National Assembly of Pakistan representing Noakhali-III.
