= Fayakuzzaman =

Pakistani Bengali politician

- ফায়েকুজ্জামান; فائق الزمان

Member of 3rd National Assembly
- In office 1962–1965
- Succeeded by: Abdur Rahman Bakaul
- Constituency: NE-35 (Faridpur-III)

Personal details
- Born: Gopalganj, Faridpur District, Bengal Presidency
- Relatives: Wahiduzzaman; Sharfuzzaman

Fayakuzzaman (Bengali: ফায়েকুজ্জামান, Urdu: فائق الزمان) was a member of the 3rd National Assembly of Pakistan as a representative of East Pakistan.

== Career ==
Fayakuzzaman was a member of the 3rd National Assembly of Pakistan representing Faridpur-III.
