= Begum Roquyya Anwar =

Pakistani MNA

Begum Roquyya Anwar was a member of the 3rd National Assembly of Pakistan as a representative of East Pakistan.

== Career ==
Anwar was a member of the 3rd National Assembly of Pakistan in a seat reserved for women.
