= S. Zaman =

Pakistani politician

S. Zaman was a Member of the 3rd National Assembly of Pakistan as a representative of East Pakistan.

== Career ==
Zaman was a Member of the 3rd National Assembly of Pakistan representing Mymensingh-IX.
