= Aftabuddin Ahmad =

Pakistani politician

Aftabuddin Ahmad was a Member of the 3rd National Assembly of Pakistan as a representative of East Pakistan.

== Career ==
Ahmad was a Member of the 3rd National Assembly of Pakistan representing Mymensingh-VIII.
