= A. B. M. Ahmad Ali Mondal =

Pakistani MNA

A. B. M. Ahmad Ali Mondal was a Member of the 3rd National Assembly of Pakistan as a representative of East Pakistan.

== Career ==
Mondal was a Member of the 3rd National Assembly of Pakistan.
