= Abdul Ali Menu Miah =

Pakistani politician

Abdul Ali, also known as Menu Miah, was a Bengali Pakistani politician who was a member of the 4th National Assembly of Pakistan from 1965 to 1969.

Abdul Ali was born in November 1904 in Mymensingh District. He became a lawyer. He joined the All-India Muslim League in 1937.

Abdul Ali was elected to the Pakistan National Assembly in 1965 for constituency Mymensingh-IX as a Convention Muslim League candidate. He was elected to the assembly's Standing Committee on Finance.

He agreed to be a candidate for constituency Mymensingh-XXVI of the East Pakistan Provincial Assembly in the planned 1971 East Pakistan by-elections. The by-election never took place because the Indo-Pakistani war of 1971 intervened.
