= 1965 Pakistani general election =

- 21 March 1965

150 of the 156 seats in the National Assembly 76 seats needed for a majority
- Registered: 10,651
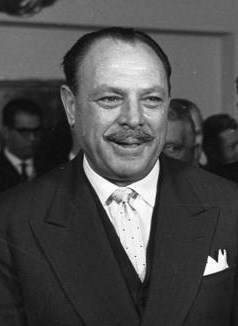

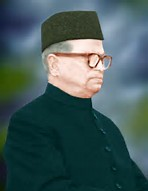
	First party	Second party
Leader	Ayub Khan	Nurul Amin
Party	PMLC	COP
Leader since	1963	1964
Last election	New	New
Seats won	120	16
Seat change	▲120	▲16
Head of government before election
Ayub Khan
PMLC
Elected Head of government
Ayub Khan
PMLC

General elections were held in Pakistan on 21 March 1965. The National Assembly was elected indirectly by the basic democracy electoral college system, with electoral college members elected in October and November 1964.

== Background ==
The 1962 constitution provided for an indirectly elected 156-seat National Assembly, of which 150 seats were elected from single-member constituencies by electoral colleges and six seats reserved for women, who were elected by the 150 general members. The seats were divided equally between East and West Pakistan. There were 80,000 members of the electoral college ("basic democrats"), 40,000 in each wing.

The electoral college members were elected between 31 October and 9 November 1964 in West Pakistan and from 10 to 19 November in East Pakistan. A total of 264,254 candidates submitted nomination papers, of which 192,416 were successfully registered after disqualifications, withdrawals and retirements. 11,652 were elected unopposed.

The first task of the basic democrats was to elect the president, which occurred on 2 January 1965.

== Results ==
Several opposition parties, including the Awami League, the Council Muslim League, Jamaat-e-Islami, the National Awami Party and its northwestern Wali faction, as well as the Nizam-e-Islam Party, formed a coalition to contest the elections as the Combined Opposition Parties.

A total of 672 candidates submitted nomination papers for the National Assembly elections, of which 437 were approved. 18 candidates were elected unopposed from constituencies with 10,651 basic democrats.

The Convention Muslim League won 120 seats and the opposition Combined Opposition Party and National Democratic Front 16. 25 incumbent MPs lost their seats, including one minister.

Party	Seats
Convention Muslim League	120
Combined Opposition Parties	10
National Democratic Front	6
Independents	14
Total	150
Source: Kamran

== See also ==
- List of members of the 4th National Assembly of Pakistan
