= National Democratic Front (Pakistan) =

- Abbreviation: NDF
- Leader: Nurul Amin
- Founder: Huseyn Shaheed Suhrawardy
- Founded: 4 October 1962
- Dissolved: June 1969
- Succeeded by: Pakistan Democratic Party
- Ideology: Parliamentary democracy Progressivism; Anti-Ayub Khan
- Political position: Big tent

National Democratic Front was a Pakistani coalition founded on 4 October 1962. It was the first political alliance to oppose the military regime of Ayub Khan in Pakistan.

== History ==
On 8 June 1962, the second constitution of Pakistan was promulgated by president Ayub Khan. On 4 October 1962, politician Huseyn Shaheed Suhrawardy formed a political alliance with opposition leaders from several political parties of Pakistan named National Democratic Front. The front stated that their goal was to bring democracy in the country as the constitution neglected democratic values. As of the Political Parties Act, politicians disqualified under Public Office Disqualification Order and Election Bodies Disqualification Order were barred from joining any political party. However, the act didn't mention political alliance and disqualified politicians started to join National Democratic Front. Later the government had to clarify the term "political party" in the act. But after the death of Suhrawardy on 5 December 1963, the alliance became inactive. On 22 January 1964, National Awami Party, All-Pakistan Awami League and Council Muslim League reformed the political alliance. However, the revival of political parties and differences among them was the reason of the alliance's failure. In 1969, the alliance ceased to exist and three major political group of the alliance, Nasrullah faction of All-Pakistan Awami League, Nizam-e-Islam Party and Justice Party merged with Pakistan Democratic Party.

== Notable members ==
1. All-Pakistan Awami League
2. Council Muslim League
3. Jamaat-e-Islami Pakistan
4. Krishak Sramik Party
5. National Awami Party
6. Nizam-e-Islam Party

== Elections ==
Six members from the front won the general election.

Pakistan National Assembly election

| Election | Party leader | Votes | % | Seats | +/– | Position | Government |
|---|---|---|---|---|---|---|---|
| 1965 | Nurul Amin | | 4% | 6 / 150 | ▲6 | ▲3rd | Opposition |

| Constituency | Party | Member |
|---|---|---|
| NE-35 Faridpur-II | Nizam-e-Islam Party | Abul Hafez Mohsenuddin Ahmed II |
| NE-44 Dacca-VI | Krishak Sramik Party | ASM Solomon |
| NE-56 Sylhet-I | Independent | Mahmud Ali |
| NE-20 Bakerganj-II | Independent | Khan Fazle Rub Chowdhury |

East Pakistan Provincial Assembly election

| Election | Party leader | Votes | % | Seats | +/– | Position | Government |
|---|---|---|---|---|---|---|---|
| 1965 | Nurul Amin | | 6.45% | 10 / 155 | ▲10 | ▲5th | Opposition |
