= Ganatantri Dal =

Defunct political party in Pakistan

- President: Haji Mohammad Danesh (1953); Mahmud Ali (1954)
- Secretary-General: Mahmud Ali
- Founded: 19 January 1953
- Dissolved: 23 July 1957
- Merged into: NAP
- Ideology: Socialism; Secularism

The Ganatantri Dal was East Pakistan's first secular political party. It was founded on 19 January 1953 by Mahmud Ali with Haji Mohammad Danesh, a veteran communist activist of the Tebhaga movement as its first president. The party was the first to open its doors to non-Muslims on an equal footing and demanded a secular constitution. The Ganatantri Dal called for an independent foreign policy and opposed the Muslim League's pro-west stance. The party manifesto included the demand for the abolition of feudalism without any compensation, the release of political prisoners, secession from the Commonwealth, nationalization of jute trade, equal rights for women and minorities in social, political and economic spheres, and abolition of visa system between Pakistan and India.

Mahmud Ali later became its president and formed a coalition with the United Front which swept the 1954 provincial elections in East Bengal.

The Supreme Council of the party, meeting from 21 to 23 July 1957, decided to cease independent operations and merge with the newly forming National Awami Party (NAP).

It had its own flag, half red and half blue. "The red, with a symbol of a plough on it, stands for progress and agrarian economy. The blue, with three stars, indicates peace and alliance with national bourgeoisie, working classes and the peasantry."
