= Abdul Waseque =

Abdul Waseque was a Member of the 3rd National Assembly of Pakistan as a representative of East Pakistan.

== Early life ==
Waseque was born in Dhaka in 1909.

== Career ==
Waseque was a Member of the 3rd National Assembly of Pakistan representing Dacca-I.

== Death ==
Waseque died on 21 November 1967.
