= Abdul Khaleque Ahmed =

Pakistani politician

Abdul Khaleque Ahmed was a member of the 3rd National Assembly of Pakistan from East Pakistan.

== Career ==
Ahmed was a member of the 3rd National Assembly of Pakistan (1962–1964) representing Mymensingh-cum-Sylhet.
