= PowerPac Economic Zone =

Coordinates: 22.499°N 89.605°E

PowerPac Economic Zone (Mongla)
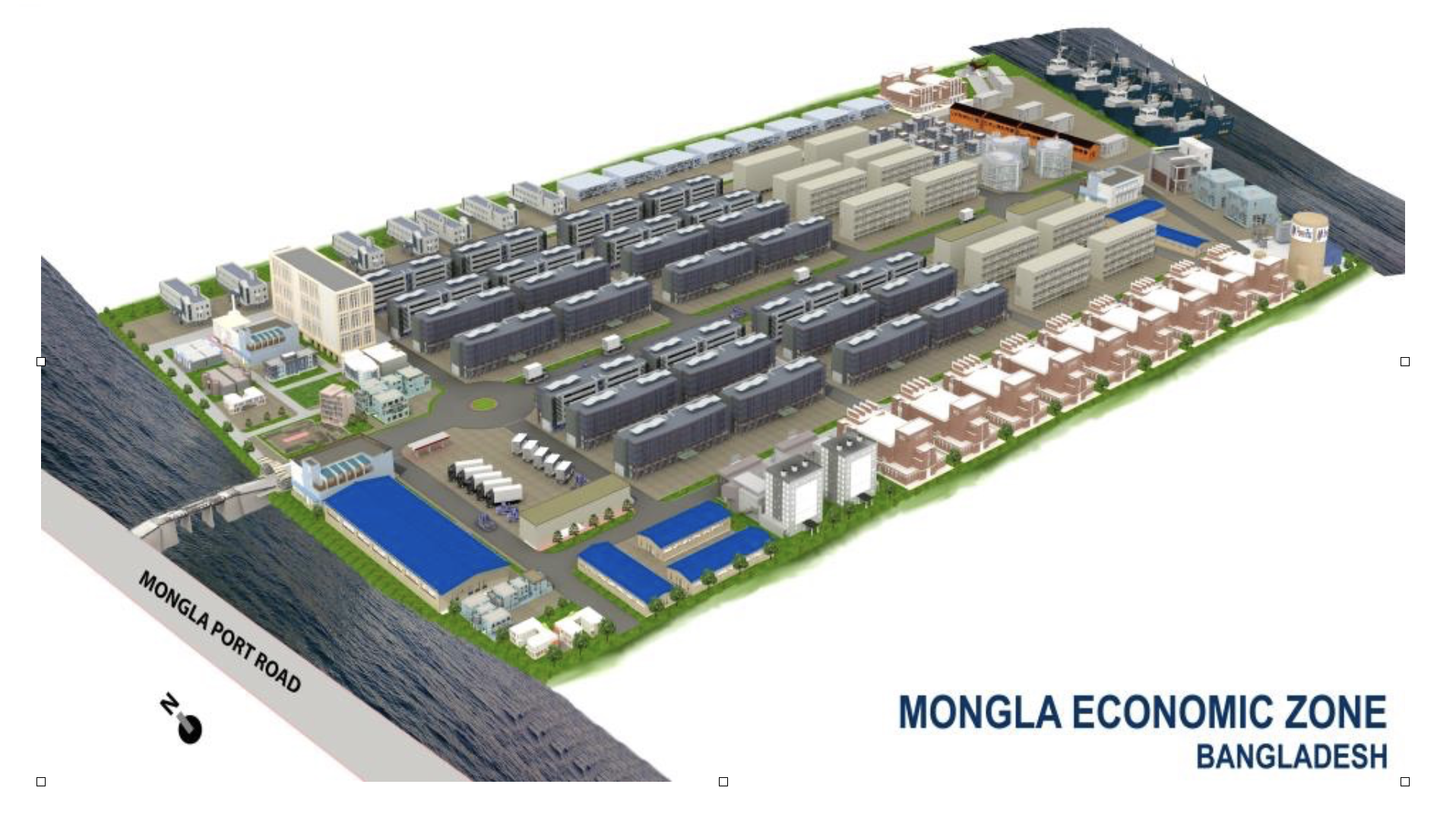
- Headquarters: Port of Mongla, Bangladesh
- Website: www.economiczone.com

PowerPac Economic Zone is a private export processing zone located in Mongla Port, Khulna, in Bangladesh. It is the first Special Economic Zone under PPP model. The site for the PowerPac economic zone has been identified as a land parcel of 205 acres that lies 40 km from Khulna city, 105 km from Jessore airport and 230 km from capital Dhaka.

== History ==
August 2015 the negotiation teams of Bangladesh Economic Zones Authority (BEZA) and PowerPac have finalized the draft agreement for appointment of Developer of Mongla Economic Zone (PPP model). An agreement will be signed between Bangladesh Economic Zones Authority (BEZA) and PowerPac after the draft is approved by Prime Minister's Office and vetted by Legislative and Parliamentary Airfares Division. PowerPac is a subsidiary of Sikder Group.

== Connectivity ==
- Road: 40 km from Khulna City, 230 km from Dhaka
- Rail: 0.5 km from Mongla railway station rail link, a rail track for passenger and freight transport to Mongla port.
- Air: 105 km from Jessore Airport
- River: Direct access to Mongla River (Mongla Port, country's 2nd largest sea port is located 0.5 km away)
