= Azizur Rahman Mollah =

Politician in Pakistan

Azizur Rahman Mollah was a Member of the 4th National Assembly of Pakistan as a representative of East Pakistan.

== Career ==
Mollah was a Member of the 4th National Assembly of Pakistan representing Comilla-I.
