= Aval =

Aval (lit. 'She' in Tamil) may refer to these Indian films:

- Aval (1967 film)
- Aval (1972 film)
- Aval (2017 film)

== See also ==
- Aval (TV series), a 2011 Indian Tamil-language family soap opera
- Awwal (disambiguation)
- Flattened rice, also known as "aval" in Tamil and Malayalam languages
