= Mobarak Ali =

Member of Pakistan's 4th National Assembly

Mobarak Ali was a Member of the 4th National Assembly of Pakistan as a representative of East Pakistan.

== Career ==
Ali was a Member of the 4th National Assembly of Pakistan representing fgh.
