= Chowdhury Abraruddin Ahmed Siddiky =

Chowdhury Abraruddin Ahmed Siddiky was a member of the 3rd National Assembly of Pakistan and former member of the Baliadi Zamindar family.

== Career ==
Siddiky was elected to the 3rd National Assembly of Pakistan, representing Dacca-4 in 1962.

Siddiky was a leader of the East Pakistan Film Association and East Bengal Film Association. He founded the Manasi Cinema Hall in Dhaka in 1926. Rabindranath Tagore named the theatre. He was a member of Baliadi Zamindar family in Gazipur.
