= Masihuddin Ahmad =

Pakistani politician

Masihuddin Ahmad, also known as Raja Miah, was a Member of the 3rd National Assembly of Pakistan as a representative of East Pakistan, for a constituency in the Manikganj area of Dacca District in East Pakistan from 1962.

In 1947, he was listed in the proceedings of the Bengal Legislative Assembly.

In March 1963, the House sanctioned Ahmad, along with another member, for absence over health issues. He died of cancer in early July 1963.

== Career ==
Ahmad was a Member of the 3rd National Assembly of Pakistan representing Dhaka-II (present Manikganj).
