= A. K. M. Ziaul Ameen =

Pakistani politician

A. K. M. Ziaul Ameen was a Member of the 3rd National Assembly of Pakistan as a representative of East Pakistan.

== Career ==
Ameen was a Member of the 3rd National Assembly of Pakistan representing Comilla-I.
