= Hasan Imam (politician) =

Pakistani politician

Hasan Imam was a Member of the 3rd National Assembly of Pakistan as a representative of East Pakistan.

== Career ==
Imam was a Member of the 3rd National Assembly of Pakistan representing Comilla-VI.
