= Khurshed Ahmed Khan =

Khurshed Ahmed Khan was a Member of the 4th National Assembly of Pakistan as a representative of East Pakistan.

== Career ==
Khan was a Member of the 4th National Assembly of Pakistan.
