= Hemayetuddin Ahmed =

Pakistani politician

Hemayetuddin Ahmed was a Member of the 4th National Assembly of Pakistan as a representative of East Pakistan.

== Career ==
Ahmed was a Member of the 3rd National Assembly of Pakistan representing Khulna-I.

Ahmed was a Member of the 4th National Assembly of Pakistan.
