= N.A. Lashkar =

N.A. Lashkar was a Member of the 4th National Assembly of Pakistan as a representative of East Pakistan.
