= Sharafat Uddin Ahmad =

Pakistani politician

Sharafat Uddin Ahmad was a Member of the 3rd National Assembly of Pakistan as a representative of East Pakistan.

== Career ==
Ahmad was a Member of the 3rd National Assembly of Pakistan representing Mymensingh-IV. He was a Member of the 4th National Assembly of Pakistan representing Mymensingh-IV.
