= Abdur Rashid (Jessore politician) =

Pakistani politician

Abdur Rashid was a member of the 3rd National Assembly of Pakistan representing Jessore-III.

== See also ==
- Politics of Pakistan
