= Mohmmad Afsaruddin =

Pakistani politician

Mohmmad Afsaruddin was a Member of the 3rd National Assembly of Pakistan as a representative of East Pakistan.

== Career ==
Afsaruddin was a Member of the 3rd National Assembly of Pakistan representing Bakerganj-V. Afsaruddin was a retired major.
