= A.B.M. Nurul Islam =

Bangladeshi politician

- Born: 1937 (age 88–89)
- Occupation: representative of East Pakistan

A.B.M. Nurul Islam was a member of the 4th National Assembly of Pakistan as a representative of East Pakistan.

== Early life and education ==
Islam was born in 1937 at Hogladangi village, in what is now Bhanga Upazila, Faridpur District, to Moulvi Abdus Sattar, a landlord. Islam married in 1953. He received his Intermediate of Arts diploma from Rajendra College, Faridpur, in 1955. He earned a B.A. in political science in 1959 and an LL.B. in 1960 from the University of Dhaka, where he was active in student politics.

== Career ==
In 1961, Islam enrolled as an advocate at the Dacca High Court. He was elected to the 4th National Assembly of Pakistan, representing the Faridpur-cum-Dacca constituency, in 1965 as an Awami League candidate.
