= A. T. M. Abdul Mateen =

Pakistani politician (1925–2001)

A. T. M. Abdul Mateen (25 February 1925 – 5 March 2001) was a Pakistani politician who was member of the 4th National Assembly of Pakistan as a representative of East Pakistan.

== Life and career ==
Mateen was born on 25 February 1925 at Aswinpur in Comilla district of British India (now Chandpur District, Bangladesh). He earned a B.A. in economics in 1947 from Aligarh University. In 1949, he completed an M.A. in economics and an LL. B. from the same university.

He was a lecturer in economics at Erstwhile Nawab Ahsanullah Engineering & Technology, Now BUET, Dacca, from 1950 to 1953. In 1952, he was awarded a Fulbright Scholarship to study at Cornell University in the United States. There he received a second M.A. in 1953, in international economics.

The Franklin Book Program was a US-funded initiative to "assist developing countries in the creation, production, distribution, and use of books". It established a field office in Dacca in 1955. Mateen was its first director. During his ten years at the helm, the program, among other things, worked with 40 local publishing houses to produce translations of 150 science books into Bengali.

Mateen was a member of the 4th National Assembly of Pakistan, representing Comilla-IV. He served as the Deputy Speaker of the National Assembly.

Mateen died from a cardiac arrest at Long Island Hospital in New York City, on 5 March 2001, at the age of 76.
