= Moazzem Ahmed Chowdhury =

Muazzam Ahmed Choudhury was a Member of the 4th National Assembly of Pakistan as a representative of East Pakistan.

== Career ==
Chowdhury worked with Sheikh Mujibur Rahman to defend a Muslim slum in Kolkata near Circus Park during the 1946 Kolkata riots on Direct Action Day. He was a leader of the student wing of the Bengal Muslim League and close confident of Sheikh Mujibur Rahman. He was part of the "Inner Group" that sought to create independent Bangladesh under the leadership of Sheikh Mujibur Rahman with support from India. He was joined by Foyez Ahmad and Abu Naser Chowdhury.

Choudhury was a Member of the 4th National Assembly of Pakistan representing Sylhet-V from 1965 to 1969.
