= S.M.A. Majeed =

S.M.A. Majeed was a Member of the 4th National Assembly of Pakistan as a representative of East Pakistan.

== Career ==
Majeed was a Member of the 4th National Assembly of Pakistan representing fgh. In parliament he raised the demand for an airport in Khulna to the Minister of Defence.
