= Azizur Rahman =

Azizur Rahman (Arabic: عزيز الرحمن) is a male Muslim given name, meaning dear to the Most Gracious. It may refer to:

- Azizur Rahman (poet) (1917–1978), a Bangladeshi poet and lyricist
- Azizur Rahman Mallick, known as A R Mallick (1918–1997), Bangladeshi historian and educationist
- Shah Azizur Rahman (1925–1988), Bangladeshi politician who served as the Prime Minister of Bangladesh
- Azizur Rahman (film director) (1939–2022), Bangladeshi film director, cinematographer, art director and screenwriter
- Azizur Rahman (Moulvibazar politician) (1943–2020), Bangladesh Awami League politician from Moulvibazar
- Azizur Rahman (Indian politician), from Bijinor, India
- Azizur Rahman (Pakistani politician), representing East Bengal
- Azizur Rahman (Rajshahi politician) (1948–2018), Bangladeshi politician
- Aziz-ur-Rehman (cricketer, born 1959), Pakistani cricketer and umpire
- Aziz-ur-Rehman (cricketer, born 1966), Pakistani cricketer
- Aziz ur-Rahman, known as Bangla Bhai (1970–2007), Bangladeshi Islamist insurgent
- Aziz-ur Rehman (1923–2014), Pakistani field hockey player
- Mohammad Azizur Rahman (born 1945), Bangladesh Army major general
- Muhammad Azizur Rahman, Bangladeshi politician

== See also ==
- Aziz-ul-Rahman Usmani, Indian scholar
