= Shamsuddin Sikder =

Bengali politician

- শামসুদ্দীন শিকদার

Member of the National Assembly of Pakistan

Member of the Bengal Legislative Assembly
- In office 1946–1947
- Preceded by: A. K. Fazlul Huq
- Succeeded by: Assembly disbanded
- Constituency: Patuakhali South

Personal details
- Born: Patuakhali, Backergunge District, Bengal Presidency

Shamsuddin Sikder (Bengali: শামসুদ্দীন শিকদার) was a Member of the 3rd National Assembly of Pakistan as a representative of East Pakistan.

== Early life ==
Sikder was born into a Bengali Muslim family of Shiqdars in Patuakhali, Backergunge District, Bengal Presidency.

== Career ==
Sikder was elected to the Bengal Legislative Assembly for Patuakhali South constituency after succeeding at the 1946 elections.

Sikder was a Member of the 3rd National Assembly of Pakistan representing Bakerganj-II.
