= Kazi Abdul Majid =

Pakistani politician

Kazi Abdul Majid (born 1910) was a member of the 3rd National Assembly of Pakistan as a representative of East Pakistan.

== Career ==
Majid was a member of the 3rd National Assembly of Pakistan representing Rajshahi-IV. Majid was a member of the 4th National Assembly of Pakistan representing Rajshahi-IV.
