= Abdur Rabb (politician) =

Pakistani politician

Abdur Rabb was a Member of the 3rd National Assembly of Pakistan as a representative of East Pakistan.

== Career ==
Rabb was a Member of the 3rd National Assembly of Pakistan representing Bakerganj-III.
