= Erfan Reza Choudhury =

Politician in Pakistan

Erfan Reza Choudhury was a Member of the 3rd National Assembly of Pakistan as a representative of East Pakistan.

== Career ==
Choudhury was a Member of the 3rd National Assembly of Pakistan representing Rajshahi-II.
