= Mahtab Uddin Ahmad =

Pakistani politician

Mahtab Uddin Ahmad was a Member of the 4th National Assembly of Pakistan as a representative of East Pakistan.

== Career ==
Ahmad was a Member of the 4th National Assembly of Pakistan representing Dacca-I.
