= Borhanuddin Upazila =

Borhanuddin বোরহানউদ্দিন
- Upazila
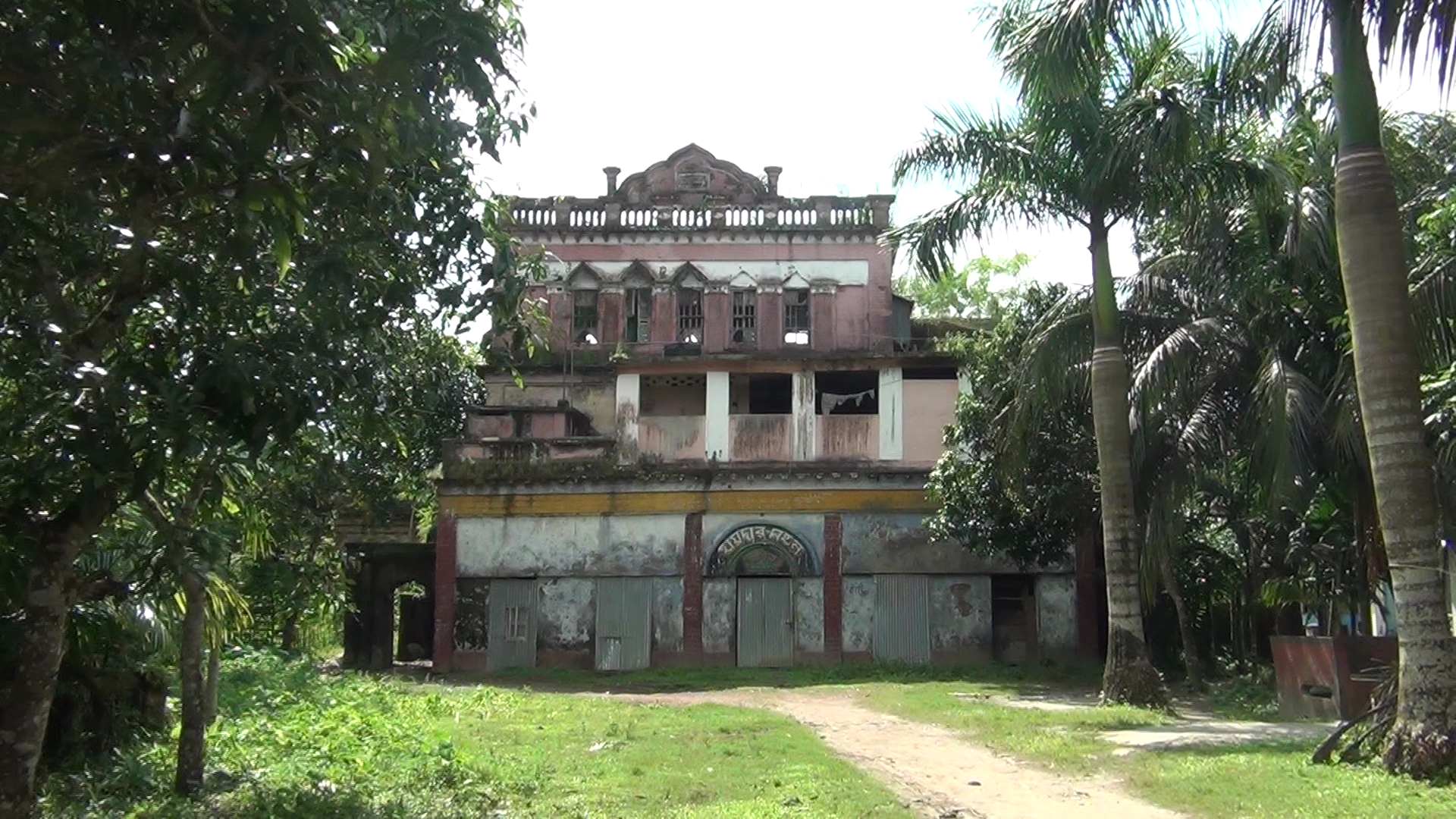
- Haydar Ali Zamindar Bari, Borhanuddin upazila

- Coordinates: 22°30′N 90°43.3′E
- Country: Bangladesh
- Division: Barisal Division
- District: Bhola District

Government
  - Upazila Chairman: Abul Kalam
  - MP (Bhola-2): Ali Azam

Area
  - Total: 284.66 km^{2} (109.91 sq mi)
- Elevation: 7 m (23 ft)

Population (2022)
  - Total: 265,437
  - Density: 932.47/km^{2} (2,415.1/sq mi)
  - Male: 126,339
  - Female: 139,091
- Time zone: UTC+6 (BST)
- Postal code: 8320
- Area code: 04922
- Website: borhanuddin.bhola.gov.bd

Burhanuddin Upazila mauza geocode map

Borhanuddin (Bengali: বোরহানউদ্দিন) is an upazila (or sub-district) of Bhola District in Barisal, Bangladesh.

== History ==
In the eighteenth century, Agha Baqer Khan held numerous jagirs across South Bengal including the area now known as Borhanuddin. During his time, he gifted two rent-free islands in the east and west of present-day Borhanuddin to an Arab family which had arrived in the region. The chief of the family was an Islamic preacher who became renowned among the locals by the name Syed Auliya. The Sufi heritage of Borhanuddin can be recognised through the mazars of many faqirs there such as that of Rahman Faqir in Gunaighar, Kawthar Dawlat Shah Faqir in Mashakira and Muin ad-Din Faqir in Ponra.

Khairullah Hawladar was a Muslim zamindar based in Kalaiya, Patuakhali. His son and successor, Borhanuddin Chowdhury Hawladar, purchased the Kaliganj area of Krishnadevpur Pargana from Kaliprasanna Bhattacharjee, a zamindar of Faridpur. The area was first named Kaliganj by the British administration, and was unified on 15 January 1872. As Kaliganj came under the control of the Hawladars, it started to become known as Borhanuddin Hawladar's Haat. Thus at that time, Borhanuddin Haat was under the Hawladars and Baramganj (later Borhanganj) was under the control of the Hindu Bhattacharyas. Borhanuddin was first established as a replacement thana (police station headquarters) in 1876, due to a flood which heavily damaged the former thana in nearby Borhanganj. It was officially established as a thana in 1928. Around 1939, the closing of the pond ghatla designated for Borhanuddin Jame Masjid caused adverse reactions among the local Muslims. After a few lawsuits, a conflict emerged. A total area of 55 feet on both sides of the road from Onek Tiktokar Poler Para to the present Thana was settled in the name of Borhanuddin Howladar and given the present name (Borhanuddin).

During the Bangladesh War of 1971, the Borhanuddin Thana Sangram Parishad was founded on 9 March with Reza-e-Karim Chowdhury Chunnu Miah as president, Bashiruddin Miah as vice-president, Muhammad Sirajul Islam as general secretary, Doctor Sayyid Ahmad as treasurer, Anwar Husayn Bhuiyan as publicity officer and Fakhrul Alam Chowdhury and Sirajul Islam Chandu Master as members. Its student wing, the All-Parties Student Sangram Committee, was led by Muhammad Zulfiqar Ali, Tazimuddin Nurnabi, Moslem Hawladar, Jahangir Mahbub, Shahid Rab and Abu. All of the forces of Bhola were based in Borhanuddin such as the force of Abul Kashem of Char Fasson in Borhanuddin High School and Havildar Majibur Rahman's force in Borhanuddin Primary School. The India-trained faction had possession of modern weaponry. High Command Subedar Siddiqur Rahman led the home Borhanuddin force, battling the army in the villages of Sachra and Deula. Mawlana Maqsufur Rahman played an important role in the Deula victory. Other notable members of the home force of Borhanuddin were Akbar Ali, Shamsul Haq, Ibrahim Miah, Muhammad Siddiq, Nayek Asmat Ali and Lance-Nayek Ziaul Haq. On the morning of 18 October, Siddiqur Rahman and one hundred Bengali fighters besieged the thana. The OC (Officer in Charge) of Borhanuddin Thana flew a white flag, signalling a surrender. Motahar Uddin, Reza-e-Karim Chowdhury MPA and CO Azizul Islam made the officers at the thana surrender. The fighters collected seventy rifles and ammunition. On 22 October, houses in the villages of Tetulia, Betua and Deula were set on fire by the army. Siddiqur Rahman and his force launched an attack at Deula Dighir Par, leading to the death of 50 soldiers from the army including their supporters, the OC (Officer in Charge) of Borhanuddin Thana. The Pakistani army attempted to regain control of the thana which had been under the control of fighters since 18 October. The fighters thought that the Pakistani army would come from Bhola by land, and not river. However, on the morning of 29 October, the Pakistan Army arrived in Borhanuddin via gunboats and launches. The fighters were not informed of this, and the army proceeded towards the thana. The army burnt down Borhanuddin bazaar and Borhanganj, whilst Tansen and Jalil shot at the army car. 71 people were killed on that day by the army, including Sayyid Ahmad Dalalpuri, the Postmaster of Borhanuddin. The army left before noon, and camped at the office of CO Dave, who supported the fighters. Despite Siddiqur Rahman's force consisting of 500 freedom fighters, the brawl at the thana was unsuccessful in Borhanuddin. People from Borhanuddin also contributed to the war in other parts of the country, among the martyred are EBR Lance-Nayek Tafazzal Husayn Chakachashi in Chittagong, EBR Muhammad Sadiq Batamari in Rajshahi and EPR Mukhlisur Rahman in Comilla.

In 1976, the site of the present police station was taken from Shailabala Chaudhurani. The status of Borhanuddin Thana was upgraded to upazila (sub-district) in 1983 as part of President Hussain Muhammad Ershad's decentralisation programme.

== Geography ==
Borhanuddin is located at 22.5000°N 90.7217°E, 22 kilometres south of Bhola town. It has 37,413 households and a total area of 284.67 km^{2}. It is bounded by Bhola Sadar and Daulatkhan upazilas on the north, Lalmohan on the south, Tazumuddin upazila on the east, and Bauphal upazila of Patuakhali district on the west.

== Demographics ==
Religions in Burhanuddin Upazila (2022)
Religion	Percent
Islam	96.08%
Hinduism	3.91%
Other or not stated	0.01%

According to the 2022 Bangladeshi census, Borhanuddin Upazila had 62,027 households and a population of 265,437. 11.73% of the population were under 5 years of age. Borhanuddin had a literacy rate (age 7 and over) of 69.32%: 70.16% for males and 68.57% for females, and a sex ratio of 90.83 males for every 100 females. 73,828 (27.81%) lived in urban areas.

According to the 2011 Census of Bangladesh, Burhanuddin upazila had a population of 233,860 living in 48,534 households. The literacy rate was 47.91% and the sex ratio was 1033 females per 1000 males. 38,401 (16.42%) live in urban areas.

Per the 2001 Bangladesh census, Burhanuddin upazila had a population of 244,137; males constituted 125,828, females constituted 118,309 and there are 13,174 Hindus, 14 Buddhists and 49 people of other faiths.

According to the 1991 Bangladesh census, Borhanuddin had a population of 208,478. Males constituted 51.13% of the population, and females constituted 48.87%. The population aged 18 or over was 94,581. Borhanuddin had an average literacy rate of 21.2% (7+ years), compared to the national average of 32.4%.

== Administration ==
Burhanuddin Thana was formed in 1928 and it was turned into an upazila on 15 April 1983.

Borhanuddin Upazila is divided into Borhanuddin Municipality and nine union parishads: Boro Manika, Deula, Gongapur, Hasannogor, Kachia, Kutuba, Pakshia, Sachra, and Tobgi. The union parishads are subdivided into 57 mauzas and 46 villages.

Borhanuddin Municipality is subdivided into 9 wards and 13 mahallas.

=== Chairmen ===
List of chairmen
Number	Name	Term
01	Hazrat Mawlana Sirajul Islam Sharif	1985-1989
02	Reza-i-Karim Chowdhury Chunnu Miah	1989-1991
03	Jasimuddin Haydar	20/2/2009-25/3/2014
04	Mahabbat Jan Chaudhury	25/3/2014-2019
05	Abul Kalam	2019–present

== Notable people ==
- Shah Nazibul Huq, politician and lawyer
- Ali Azam, former mayor of Borhanuddin Municipality
- Siddiqur Rahman, freedom fighter and politician
- Syed Azizur Rahman, politician
- Sayed Kamaluddin Zafree, Islamic scholar

== See also ==
- Upazilas of Bangladesh
- Districts of Bangladesh
- Divisions of Bangladesh
- Administrative geography of Bangladesh
