= Jamalus Sattar =

Pakistani politician

Jamalus Sattar was a Member of the 3rd National Assembly of Pakistan from 1962 to 1964 as a representative of East Pakistan.

== Career ==
Sattar was a Member of the 3rd National Assembly of Pakistan representing Chittagong- III.
