= Mukhlesuzzaman Khan =

Pakistani politician

Mukhlesuzzaman Khan was a Member of the 4th National Assembly of Pakistan as a representative of East Pakistan.

== Career ==
Khan was a Member of the 4th National Assembly of Pakistan representing Mymensingh-VIII.
