= Borhanuddin (town) =

Town and municipality in Barisal Division

Borhanuddin বোরহানউদ্দিন
- Town and Municipality
- Location in Bangladesh
- Coordinates: 22.498°N 90.717°E
- Country: Bangladesh
- Division: Barisal Division
- District: Bhola District
- Upazila: Borhanuddin Upazila

Government
  - Type: Municipality
  - Body: Borhanuddin Municipality

Area
  - Total: 25.66 km^{2} (9.91 sq mi)

Population (2001)
  - Total: 26,053
  - Density: 1,015/km^{2} (2,630/sq mi)
- Time zone: UTC+6 (BST)

Borhanuddin is a town in Bhola District in Barisal Division, Bangladesh. It is the administrative headquarters and urban centre of Borhanuddin Upazila.

== See also ==
- Borhanuddin Upazila
- List of municipal corporations in Bangladesh
