= Mosaheb Ali Khan =

East Pakistani politician

Mosaheb Ali Khan was a Member of the 3rd National Assembly of Pakistan as a representative of East Pakistan, representing Mymensingh-III.
