= Sirajul Islam Mia =

Bangladeshi politician

- সিরাজুল ইসলাম মিয়া

Member of the Bangladesh Parliament for Rangpur-22
- In office 18 February 1979 – 12 February 1982
- Preceded by: Tofazzal Hossain
- Succeeded by: Seats abolished

Personal details
- Born: 1919 or 1920 (age 105–106)
- Party: Bangladesh Nationalist Party

Sirajul Islam Mia (born 1919 or 1920) is a Bangladesh Nationalist Party politician. He was elected member of parliament for Rangpur-22 in the 1979 Bangladeshi general election.

== Career ==
Mia was a member of the 3rd National Assembly of Pakistan representing Rangpur-III.

Mia was elected member of parliament for constituency Rangpur-22 as a Bangladesh Nationalist Party candidate in the 1979 Bangladeshi general election.
