= Shamsur Rahman (politician) =

Bangladesh Jamaat-e-Islami politician

- Born: 6 February 1915; Mothbati village, Khulna district, British India
- Died: 2 November 2008 (aged 93)
- Occupations: Politician, journalist
- Political party: Bangladesh Jamaat-e-Islami

Shamsur Rahman (6 February 1915 – 2 November 2008) was a Bangladeshi politician and social activist. He was also member of the 3rd National Assembly of Pakistan (1962) elected from the then East Bengal. He was senior Nayeb-e-Ameer of Bangladesh Jamaat-e-Islami.

== Early life and education ==
Shamsur Rahman was born on 6 February 1915 in the village of Mathbati, in what is now Paikgachha Upazila of Khulna District in Bangladesh. He was the eldest son of Sharifatunnesa and Kafiluddin Sarder, a renowned English teacher. He completed his secondary school from Kapilmuni Sahachari Vidya Mandir in 1934, higher secondary from Government P.C. College, Bagerhat in 1937. He completed a Bachelor of Arts from Islamia College of Kolkata in 1939.

He started his profession as the principal of Krishnapur High School in the district of Midnapur at 1939. In 1941, he joined as a government official in the agriculture department.

== Journalism ==
In 1949, Shamsur Rahman started his career as a journalist. He became a correspondent of The Pakistan Observer. Later on he began to publish a weekly newspaper named The Weekly Tawhid "সাপ্তাহিক তাওহীদ". He remained as the editor of the newspaper. In 1952, the newspaper came to light as the mouthpiece of Jamaat-e Islami.

== Political career ==
Shamsur Rahman, inspired by the political thoughts of Syed Abul A'la Maududi joined Jamaat-e-Islami in the year 1952. He was elected as the Member of the National Assembly of Pakistan in the year 1962. After the liberation war of Bangladesh, he became the secretary general of Bangladesh Jamaat-e-Islami in the year 1978. Later on he became senior Nayeb-e-Ameer of Bangladesh Jamaat-e-Islami and served till 2003.

== Leadership in various institutions ==
Shamsur Rahman had carried out his duties as organizer in many social and educational institutions. He was the chairman of Adhunik Prakashani, a renowned publishing company. He also served as the chairman of The Daily Sangram and The Weekly Sonar Bangla.
