= Athar Ali Khan (politician) =

Politician in Pakistan

Athar Ali Khan was a Member of the 4th National Assembly of Pakistan as a representative of East Pakistan.

== Career ==
Khan was a Member of the 4th National Assembly of Pakistan representing Bakerganj-cum-Khulna.
