= Ismail Khan (Pakistani politician) =

Politician in Pakistan

Ismail Khan was a Member of the 4th National Assembly of Pakistan as a representative of East Pakistan.

== Career ==
Khan was a Member of the 4th National Assembly of Pakistan representing Bakerganj-V.
