= Mahmud Ali (politician) =

Pakistani politician

- মাহমুদ আলী محمود علی
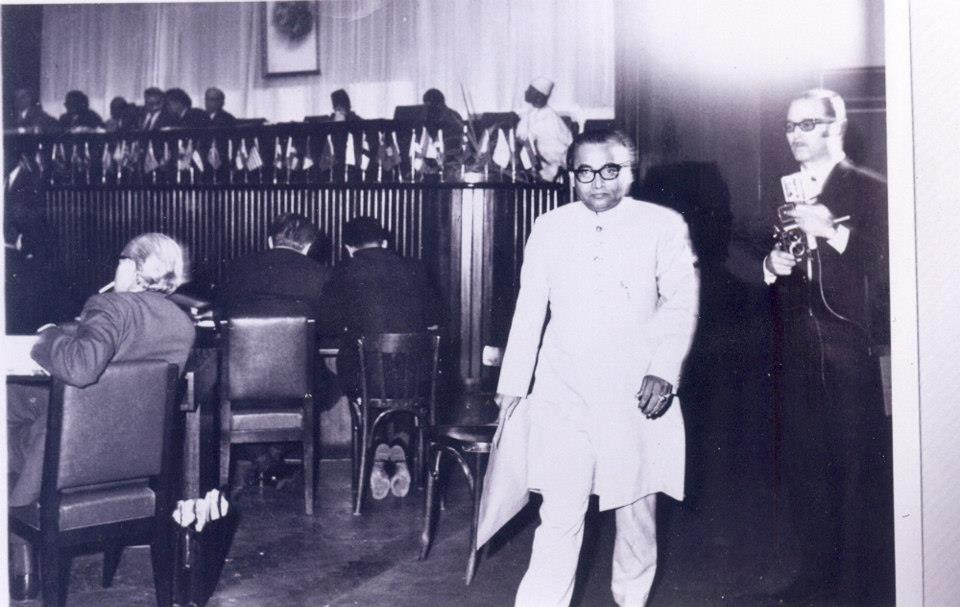

General Secretary of All India Muslim League (Assam)
- In office 1946 – 14 August 1947

Member of East Bengal Legislative Assembly
- In office 12 March 1954 – 27 May 1955

Member of Second Constituent Assembly
- In office 28 May 1955 – 22 March 1956

Member of National Assembly
- In office 23 March 1956 – 7 October 1958

Minister of State (Rank & Status)
- In office 29 December 1971 – 17 November 2006

Personal details
- Born: 1 September 1919 Sunamganj (Sylhet), Assam, British India (now in Bangladesh)
- Died: 17 November 2006 (aged 87) Lahore, Pakistan
- Party: All India Muslim League; Ganatantri Dal; United Front; National Awami Party; National Democratic Front; Pakistan Democratic Movement
- Spouse: Begum Hajera Mahmud
- Occupation: Politician, statesman, journalist

Mahmud Ali (Bengali: মাহমুদ আলী; Urdu: محمود علی; 1 September 1919 – 17 November 2006) was a progressive leftist Pakistani politician known for his agrarian politics. He was part of the Freedom Movement and played an important role during the Sylhet referendum which led to its merger with East Bengal. As member of Pakistan's Second Constituent Assembly he demanded the recognition of Bengali as one of the national languages of Pakistan and advocated the cause through his newspaper, the Nao Belal. He strongly opposed the 'One Unit' scheme and voted against the merger in 1956. After the dissolution of the assembly and abrogation of the 1956 Constitution he worked towards the restoration of provinces and a parliamentary form of government based on adult franchise.

== Early life and family ==
Mahmud Ali was born into a Bengali Muslim family of lawyers, writers and politicians on 1 September 1919, in Alimabagh, Sunamganj, Sylhet District. His father, Moulvi Mujahid Ali was a writer, poet and law graduate from the Aligarh Muslim University. His uncle, Moulvi Munawwar Ali, served as a minister in the Government of Assam under the then Chief Minister Sir Muhammed Saadulah until 1946, and later as a member of the East Bengal Legislative Assembly. Mahmud Ali's grandfather and head of the Ali family, Moulvi Musharraf Ali, originally hailed from Shahbazpur in greater Comilla, where some of his ancestors had served as Mir ul Bahr (Commander in Chief) of the Imperial Navy in the Padma region of Bengal under the Emperor of Delhi.

Mahmud Ali matriculated from the Sunamganj Government Jubilee High School in 1937 and studied at the MC College, Sylhet. He continued his studies in St. Edmunds College and St. Anthony's College and graduated with honours in English in 1942. After graduation he studied law at Calcutta University but did not continue his studies due to his involvement in the Freedom Movement.

== Freedom Movement ==
=== All India Muslim League ===
Mahmud Ali was elected as the first student President of the Assam Provincial Muslim Students Federation when Raja of Mahmudabad was President of the All India Muslim Students Federation. In 1944 he was appointed as a member of the Assam Muslim League Working Committee by the President of the Assam Provincial Muslim League, Moulana Abdul Hamid Khan Bhashani. He was later elected as the general secretary in 1946 at the age of 26.

=== The Line System and Civil Disobedience Movement ===
The Government of India Act, 1935 made provisions for a Legislative Assembly in each province in British India; and elections for the Assam Legislative Assembly were held in 1937. Sir Syed Muhammed Saadullah was elected to the assembly and in the same year joined the All India Muslim League on Jinnah's request. Saadullah led a coalition government three times between 1 April 1937 and 11 February 1946. He supported Assam's inclusion within the new state of Pakistan and opposed the Line System which restricted Muslim immigrants to certain areas of Assam. The System originated in the district of Nowgong in 1920 and the lines were drawn with no fixed principles in determining them. Immigrant opposition grew and became a powerful force under Bhashani. On 15 September 1937, Mahmud Ali's uncle, Munawwar Ali moved a resolution in the Legislative Assembly calling for the abolition of the Line System. He argued that Bengali immigrants had brought "prosperity ... and wealth to the province of Assam". The motion was supported by Abdul Matin Choudhury.

Abdul Hamid Khan Bhashani adopted an uncompromising attitude and the resolution of the Working Committee of the Assam Provincial Muslim League held on 15 December 1944, called upon the government to abolish "the illegal and pernicious Line System" and immediately provide land to landless Bengali immigrants. On 11 February 1946 a Congress Ministry was formed with Bardoloi as Premier. He proceeded to deal with the immigrants by eviction under the Resolution of 13 July 1945 which was passed under Saadullah's regime. Bhashani strongly opposed the eviction and advised the landless and evicted to 'spread out'. The Assam Provincial Muslim League also decided to challenge the legality of the Line System in Court.

As General Secretary of the Provincial League, Mahmud Ali stated, "The Muslim League is prepared for all eventualities and shall not retrace an inch from the chosen path. They are determined to disregard any laws which are not based on moral force". The Working Committee of the Provincial League met on 17 and 18 November 1946 and proposed to submit the issue to the arbitration of Liaquat and Nehru. The proposal was rejected by the Premier Bardoloi and eviction operations continued. Towards the end of December 1946, Bhashani, along with Mahmud Ali chalked out a programme of Civil Disobedience against the Assam Government's eviction policy and repression of Muslims. Ali sent a telegraphic message to the chairman, Committee of Action of the AIML seeking permission to launch the movement. However, the League High Command discouraged agitation.

The Provincial League met at Sylhet on 9 February 1947 and it was decided that the movement would be non-communal and non-violent. Several conferences were held including a Joint Conference with the Bengal Provincial League. At a conference held at Goalpara, attended by over 75,000 people, it was decided to provide training for armed struggle and Muslim National Guards Training Centres were opened at various places. The place of the conference was named as Purba Pakistan Killa which served as a base for launching the agitational programme. At a meeting held on 9 March 1947 it was decided to launch the Civil Disobedience Movement without the approval of the League. Mahmud Ali in a leaflet – "Struggle for Freedom Begins in Assam" invited the landless people of Bengal and Assam to occupy all waste lands in Assam and defy all laws of the Government.

Bhashani and Ali were subsequently arrested and released after 3 June Plan had been declared.

=== Sylhet Referendum ===
According to 3 June Plan (Mountbatten Plan), agreed upon by League and Congress leaders, it was decided that the borders between the two new dominions to be carved out of British India would be determined by a boundary commission led by Sir Cyril Radcliffe. The Punjab and Bengal legislative assemblies decided in favour of partition and the Muslim-majority districts formed a part of the Dominion of Pakistan. In the Frontier Province and Sylhet a referendum was held to decide their fate. Ali and Bhashani were disappointed at the decision of a referendum not being held in the whole of Assam and Bhashani disassociated himself from the referendum in protest. However, after Ali's release from imprisonment he concentrated his efforts towards the Sylhet referendum and the people decided in favour of merging the district with the province of East Bengal. Ali expressed disappointment at the exclusion of two thanas from the district.

== Pakistan (1947–1971) ==
=== Bengali Language Movement ===
During the Bengali language movement, Ali demanded the inclusion of Bengali, along with Urdu, as one of the national languages of Pakistan. He launched a weekly newspaper, the Nao Belal, to propagate the cause of the peasantry and working classes and to further the demand of Bengali as a state language. The movement was successful and Bengali was recognised as a state language by the second constituent assembly, and in the 1956 Constitution.

=== Ganatantri Dal ===
Disillusioned with the Muslim League government, Ali left the party in 1952, and on 19 January 1953 founded a secular political party, the Ganatantri Dal, with Haji Mohammad Danesh, a Kisan leader. Danesh was its first president, and Ali was the secretary general. The Ganatantri Dal was the first to open its doors to non-Muslims on an equal footing and demanded a secular constitution. The party manifesto included the demand for the abolition of feudalism without any compensation, secession from the Commonwealth, nationalisation of the jute trade, equal rights for women in social, political, and economic spheres, and abolition of the visa system between Pakistan and India.

Ali spoke out against the League's pro-West stance and called for an independent foreign policy. As president, Mahmud Ali opposed the US-Pakistan Military Aid Pact signed on 19 April 1954, and on his party's appeal, almost all political parties observed "Anti US-Pakistan Military Pact Day"

Ali was elected the member of the National Assembly of Pakistan for constituency Sylhet-I in 1965 as a representative of the National Democratic Front. He lost the next election, in 1970, as a Pakistan Democratic Party candidate for the assembly. In 1996, reminded by a Pakistani journalist that Bangladesh was a sovereign state recognised by Pakistan, Mahmud Ali remarked, "East Pakistan will always be in my heart".
