= List of members of the 3rd National Assembly of Pakistan =

Unicameral legislature after years of martial law

3rd National Assembly
←	2nd	4th	→
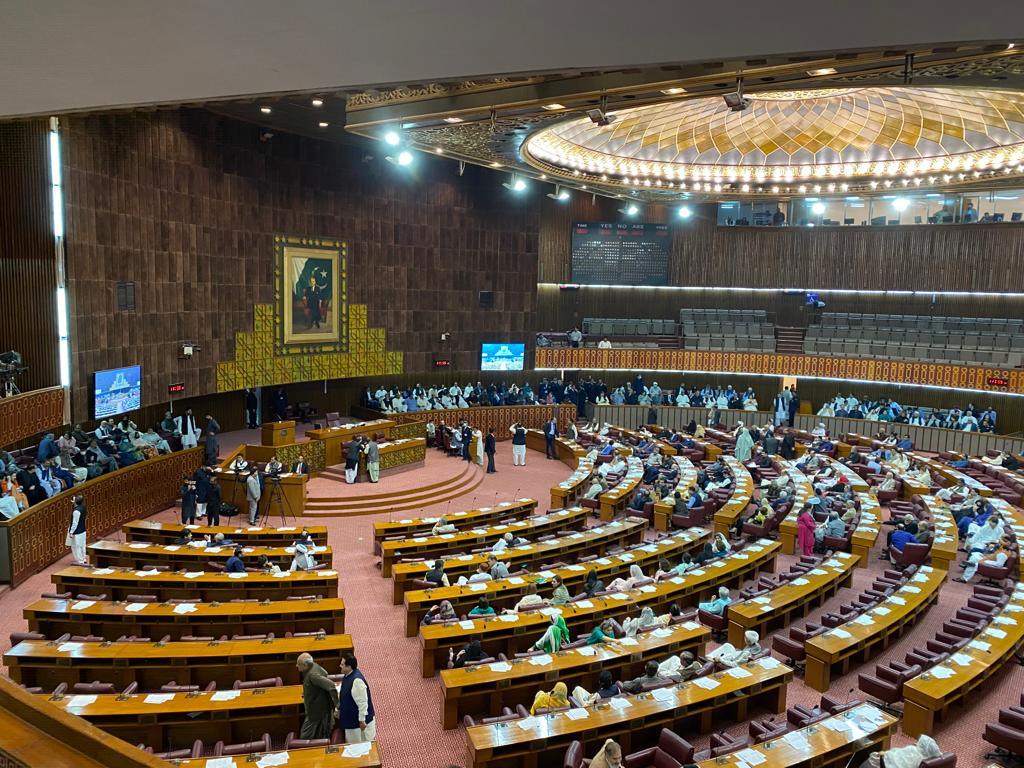

Overview
- Legislative body: National Assembly of Pakistan
- Jurisdiction: Pakistan
- Term: 8 June 1962 – 7 June 1965
- Election: 1962 Pakistani general election
- Government: Government of Pakistan
- Website: Official website

Sovereign
- Members: 156
- President: Ayub Khan

The 3rd Parliament of Pakistan (1962–1964) was the unicameral legislature of Pakistan formed after the 4 years of martial law (1958–1962). There were 156 seats of members of Parliament, including 78 from East Pakistan and 78 from West Pakistan.

== East Pakistan ==
Note: The election constituencies from the general election of 1965 are listed below, they do not link to the most recent election constituencies because they have been completely altered in area and at time also name.

	District	Constituency	Party	Member
Rajshahi	Rangpur	NE-1 (Rangpur-1)		Abul Quasem
Rajshahi	Rangpur	NE-2 (Rangpur-II)		Abdul Awal Khan
Rajshahi	Rangpur	NE-3 (Rangpur-III)		Sirajul Islam Mia
Rajshahi	Rangpur	NE-4 (Rangpur-IV)		Mohammad Amin
Rajshahi	Rangpur	NE-5 (Rangpur-V)	National Awami Party	Mashiur Rahman Jadu Mia
Rajshahi	Dinajpur	NE-6 (Dinajpur-I)		Nurul Huq Choudhury
Rajshahi	Dinajpur	NE-7 (Dinajpur-II)		Hassan Ali
Rajshahi	Dinajpur	NE-8 (Dinajpur-cum-Bogra)		Abbas Ali Khan
Rajshahi	Bogra	NE-9 (Bogra-I)		Hamida Mohammad Ali
Rajshahi	Bogra	NE-10 (Bogra-II)		Habibur Rahman
Rajshahi	Rajshahi	NE-11 (Rajshahi-I)		Muzaffar Rahman Chowdhury
Rajshahi	Rajshahi	NE-12 (Rajshahi-II)		Erfan Reza Choudhury
Rajshahi	Rajshahi	NE-13 (Rajshahi-III)	Awami League	Abul Hasanat Qamaruzzaman
Rajshahi	Rajshahi	NE-14 (Rajshahi-IV)		Kazi Abdul Majid
Rajshahi	Pabna	NE-15 (Pabna-I)		Amjad Hossain
Rajshahi	Pabna	NE-16 (Pabna-II)		Syed Hossain Mansur
Rajshahi	Pabna	NE-17 (Pabna-III)		Abdullah al Mahmood
Khulna	Bakerganj	NE-18 (Bakerganj-I)		Abdul Hye Choudhury
Khulna	Bakerganj	NE-19 (Bakerganj-II)		Shamsuddin Sikder
Khulna	Bakerganj	NE-20 (Bakerganj-III)		Abdur Rabb
Khulna	Bakerganj	NE-21 (Bakerganj-IV)		Akhtaruddin Ahmad
Khulna	Bakerganj	NE-22 (Bakerganj-V)		Mohmmad Afsaruddin
Khulna	Bakerganj	NE-23 (Bakerganj-VI)		Nurul Islam Sikder
Khulna	Bakerganj	NE-24 (Bakerganj-cum-Khulna)	Jamaat-e-Islami	Abul Kalam Mohammad Yusuf
Khulna	Khulna	NE-25 (Khulna-I)		Hemayetuddin Ahmed
Khulna	Khulna	NE-26 (Khulna-II)	Convention Muslim League	Abdus Sabur Khan
Khulna	Khulna	NE-27 (Khulna-III)	Jamaat-e-Islami	Shamsur Rahman
Khulna	Jessore	NE-28 (Jessore-I)		Muhammad Sohrab Hossain
Khulna	Jessore	NE-29 (Jessore-II)		Ahmed Ali Sardar
Khulna	Jessore	NE-30 (Jessore-III)		Abdur Rashid
Khulna	Kushtia	NE-31 (Kushtia-I)		Muhammad Abdul Haque
Khulna	Kushtia	NE-32 (Kushtia-cum-Faridpur)		Yusuf Hossain Choudhury
Dacca	Faridpur	NE-33 (Faridpur-I)		Chowdhury Abd-Allah Zaheeruddin
Dacca	Faridpur	NE-34 (Faridpur-II)		Sarwar Jahan Mia
Dacca	Faridpur	NE-35 (Faridpur-III)		Fayakuzzaman
Dacca	Faridpur	NE-36 (Faridpur-IV)	Awami League	Golam Moula
Dacca	Faridpur	NE-37 (Faridpur-cum-Dacca)		Abdul Hakim Bikrampuri
Dacca	Dacca	NE-38 (Dacca-I)		Abdul Waseque
Dacca	Dacca	NE-39 (Dacca-II)		Masihuddin Ahmad
Dacca	Dacca	NE-40 (Dacca-III)		Ali Amjad Khan
Dacca	Dacca	NE-41 (Dacca-IV)		Chowdhury Abraruddin Ahmed Siddiky
Dacca	Dacca	NE-42 (Dacca-V)		A. B. M. Ahmad Ali Mondal
Dacca	Dacca	NE-43 (Dacca-VI)		Benajir Ahmed
Dacca	Dacca	NE-44 (Dacca-VII)		Abdul Hamid
Dacca	Mymensingh	NE-45 (Mymensingh-I)		Lutfur Rahman Khan
Dacca	Mymensingh	NE-46 (Mymensingh-II)		Ibrahim Khan
Dacca	Mymensingh	NE-47 (Mymensingh-III)		Mosaheb Ali Khan
Dacca	Mymensingh	NE-48 (Mymensingh-IV)		Sharafat Uddin Ahmad
Dacca	Mymensingh	NE-49 (Mymensingh-V)		Syed Abdus Sultan
Dacca	Mymensingh	NE-50 (Mymensingh-VI)		Muhammad Abdur Rahman
Dacca	Mymensingh	NE-51 (Mymensingh-VII)		Fakhruddin Ahmed
Dacca	Mymensingh	NE-52 (Mymensingh-VIII)		Aftabuddin Ahmad
Dacca	Mymensingh	NE-53 (Mymensingh-IX)		S. Zaman
Dacca	Mymensingh	NE-54 (Mymensingh-X)		A. K. Fazlul Hoque
Dacca	Mymensingh	NE-55 (Mymensingh-cum-Sylhet)		Abdul Khaleque Ahmed
Chittagong	Sylhet	NE-56 (Sylhet-I)		Aftab Ali
Chittagong	Sylhet	NE-57 (Sylhet-II)	Independent	Mushahid Ahmad Bayampuri
Chittagong	Sylhet	NE-58 (Sylhet-III)		Abdul Muntaquim Chaudhury
Chittagong	Sylhet	NE-59 (Sylhet-IV)		Muhibur Rahman
Chittagong	Sylhet	NE-60 (Sylhet-V)		Syed Qamarul Ahsan
Chittagong	Comilla	NE-61 (Comilla-I)		A. K. Muhammad Ziaul Ameen
Chittagong	Comilla	NE-62 (Comilla-II)		Azizur Rahman
Chittagong	Comilla	NE-63 (Comilla-III)		Ramizuddin Ahmed
Chittagong	Comilla	NE-64 (Comilla-IV)		Hasan Imam
Chittagong	Comilla	NE-65 (Comilla-V)		Mizanur Rahman Chowdhury
Chittagong	Comilla	NE-66 (Comilla-VI)		Syed Habibul Haque
Chittagong	Comilla	NE-67 (Comilla-cum-Noakhali)		Mahbubul Huq
Chittagong	Noakhali	NE-68 (Noakhali-I)		Muhammad Shehabulah
Chittagong	Noakhali	NE-69 (Noakhali-II)		Razzaqul Haider Chowdhury
Chittagong	Noakhali	NE-70 (Noakhali-III)		Mansural Hoq
Chittagong	Chittagong	NE-71 (Chittagong-I)	Independent	Mustafizur Rahman Siddiqi
Chittagong	Chittagong	NE-72 (Chittagong-II)		Abul Kashem Khan
Chittagong	Chittagong	NE-73 (Chittagong-III)		Jamalus Sattar
Chittagong	Chittagong	NE-74 (Chittagong-IV)	Nizam-e-Islam	Farid Ahmad
Chittagong	Chittagong	NE-75 (Chittagong-cum-Hill Tracts)	Convention Muslim League	Fazlul Qadir Chaudhry

=== Elected members for Reserved Seats for Women ===
Constituency	Party	Member
NE-76 Women's-I		Begum Roquyya Anwar
NE-77 Women's-II		Shamsunnahar Mahmud
NE-78 Women's-III		Begum Serajunnessa Choudhury

== West Pakistan ==
Note: The election constituencies from the general election of 1962 are listed below, they do not link to the most recent election constituencies because they have been completely altered.

Region	Constituency	Member
West Pakistan	NW-1 (Karachi-I)	Khalid Jamil
West Pakistan	NW-2 (Karachi-II)	Siddique Dawood
West Pakistan	NW-3 (Karachi-cum-Lasbela)	Jam Ghulam Qadir Khan
West Pakistan	NW-4 (Kalat-Kharan-Mekran)	Ataullah Mengal
West Pakistan	NW-5 (Quetta-Sibi-Lora Lai-Zhob-Chagai)	Khair Bakhsh Marri
West Pakistan	NW-6 (Dera Ismail Khan-I)	Mufti Mehmood
West Pakistan	NW-7 (Bannu)	Saifullah Khan
West Pakistan	NW-8 (Dera Ismail Khan Agency)	Malik Darya Khan
West Pakistan	NW-9 (Peshawar-I)	Saifur Rehman Arbab
West Pakistan	NW-10 (Peshawar-cum-Mardan)	Mian Jamal Shah
West Pakistan	NW-11 (Mardan-I)	Abdul Ghafoor Khan
West Pakistan	NW-12 (Hazara-I)	Sardar Bahadur Khan
West Pakistan	NW-13 (Hazara-II)	Haneef Khan
West Pakistan	NW-14 (Hazara-III)	Muhammad Ayub Khan
West Pakistan	NW-15 (Peshawar-cum-Kohat)	Yusuf Khattak
West Pakistan	NW-16 (Peshawar Agency-I)	Malik Wali Khan
West Pakistan	NW-17 (Peshawar Agency-II)	Mohammad Shah Khisro
West Pakistan	NW-18 (Peshawar Agency-III)	Miangul Aurangzeb
West Pakistan	NW-19 (Rawalpindi-I)	Ali Asghar Shah
West Pakistan	NW-20 (Rawalpindi-II)	Hassan Akhtar
West Pakistan	NW-21 (Jhelum-I)	Afzal Mehdi Khan
West Pakistan	NW-22 (Campbellpur-Jhelum)	Khizer Hayat Khan
West Pakistan	NW-23 (Gujrat-I)	Chaudhry Zahoor Elahi
West Pakistan	NW-24 (Gujrat-II)	Fazal Ilahi Chaudhry
West Pakistan	NW-25 (Gujrat-III)	Chaudhry Jahan Khan
West Pakistan	NW-26 (Campbellpur-I)	Malik Allahyar Khan
West Pakistan	NW-27 (Sargodha-I)	Khudadad Khan Lak
West Pakistan	NW-28 (Sargodha-II)	Nur Hayat Noon
West Pakistan	NW-29 (Sargodha-III)	Mian Zakir Qureshi
West Pakistan	NW-30 (Jhang-I)	Zulfiqar Ali Bukhari
West Pakistan	NW-31 (Jhang-II)	Ghulam Haider Satiana
West Pakistan	NW-32 (Lyallpur-I)	Mian Abdul Bari
West Pakistan	NW-33 (Lyallpur-II)	Zahara Aziz
West Pakistan	NW-34 (Lyallpur-III)	Abdul Hamid
West Pakistan	NW-35 (Lyallpur-IV)	Mohammad Afzal Cheema
West Pakistan	NW-36 (Mianwali-I)	Malik Muzaffar Khan
West Pakistan	NW-37 (Lahore-I)	Sardar Rashid Ahmed
West Pakistan	NW-38 (Lahore-II)	Sardar Abdul Hamid
West Pakistan	NW-39 (Lahore-III)	Mian Salah-ud-Din
West Pakistan	NW-40 (Lahore-IV)	Chaudhry Muhammad Hussain
West Pakistan	NW-41 (Sheikhupura-I)	Chaudhuri Muhammad Hussain Chattha
West Pakistan	NW-42 (Sheikhupura-II)	Lal Khan
West Pakistan	NW-43 (Sialkot-I)	Malik Muzaffar Khan
West Pakistan	NW-44 (Sialkot-II)	Sarfaraz Khan Chaudhry
West Pakistan	NW-45 (Sialkot-III)	Abdul Aziz
West Pakistan	NW-46 (Gujranwala-I)	Jalil Ahmed Khan
West Pakistan	NW-47 (Gujranwala-II)	Irshadullah Khan
West Pakistan	NW-48 (Gujranwala-III)	Salahuddin Choudhri
West Pakistan	NW-49 (Multan-I)	Sajjad Hussain Qureshi
West Pakistan	NW-50 (Multan-II)	Malik Muhammad Akram Bosan
West Pakistan	NW-51 (Multan-III)	Qamar-uz-Zaman
West Pakistan	NW-52 (Multan-IV)	Abdul Rashid
West Pakistan	NW-53 (Multan-V)	Hamid Raza Gilani
West Pakistan	NW-54 (Montgomery-I)	Ghulam Jilani Khan
West Pakistan	NW-55 (Montgomery-II)	Ghulam Sabir Khan
West Pakistan	NW-56 (Montgomery-III)	Shah Nawaz
West Pakistan	NW-57 (Montgomery-IV)	Rana Khudadad Khan
West Pakistan	NW-58 (Muzaffargarh-I)	Nasrullah Khan
West Pakistan	NW-59 (Muzaffargarh-cum-Dera Ghazi Khan)	Ghulam Mustafa Khar
West Pakistan	NW-60 (Muzaffargarh-cum-Dera Ghazi Khan)	Balakh Sher Mazari
West Pakistan	NW-61 (Bahawalpur-cum-Rahim Yar Khan)	Abbas Abbasi
West Pakistan	NW-62 (Rahim Yar Khan-I)	Hamid-ud-Din Shah
West Pakistan	NW-63 (Bahawalpur-cum-Bahawalnagar)	Akhtar Ali
West Pakistan	NW-64 (Bahawalnagar-I)	Muhammad Qasim Malik
West Pakistan	NW-65 (Khairpur-cum-Sukkur)	Ghulam Qadir K. Panhwer
West Pakistan	NW-66 (Nawab Shah-I)	Ghulam Mustafa Jatoi
West Pakistan	NW-67 (Larkana-I)	Sardar Pir Buksh
West Pakistan	NW-68 (Jacobabad-cum-Sukkur)	Darya Khan Khoso
West Pakistan	NW-69 (Sukkur)	Sardar Ghulam Mohammad Khan
West Pakistan	NW-70 (Hyderabad-I)	Talibul Moula
West Pakistan	NW-71 (Hyderabad-II)	Aijaz Ali Khan
West Pakistan	NW-72 (Tharparkar-II)	Rasul Shah Jilani
West Pakistan	NW-73 (Sanghar-cum-Tharparkar)	Ghulam Muhammad Wassan
West Pakistan	NW-74 (Thatta-I)	Yousuf Khan Chandio
West Pakistan	NW-75 (Dadu-I)	Amir Hyder Shah

=== Elected members for Reserved Seats for Women ===
Constituency	Party	Member
NW-76 (Women's-I)		Begum Mujeeb-un-Nisa
NW-77 (Women's-II)		Zari Sarfaraz
NW-78 (Women's-III)		Begum Khadija G.A. Khan
