= Altaf Hossain Sikdar =

East Pakistani politician

Altaf Hossain Sikdar was a Member of the 4th National Assembly of Pakistan as a representative of East Pakistan.

== Career ==
Sikdar was a Member of the 4th National Assembly of Pakistan representing Jessore-I.
