= Sajedul Hoque Mukhter =

Politician in Pakistan

Sajedul Hoque Mukhter was a Member of the 4th National Assembly of Pakistan as a representative of East Pakistan.

== Career ==
Mukhter was a Member of the 4th National Assembly of Pakistan representing Comilla-VI.
