= Abdul Awal (Pakistani politician) =

Pakistani politician

Abdul Awal was a member of the 4th National Assembly of Pakistan as a representative of East Pakistan.

== Biography ==
Awal was born in 1921 in Dhaka District. He became a lawyer.

In 1962, Awal was elected to the Provincial Assembly of East Pakistan. He was a member of the 4th National Assembly of Pakistan representing Dacca-V.
