= Abdul Awal Bhuiya =

Pakistani politician

Abdul Awal Bhuiya was a member of the 4th National Assembly of Pakistan as a representative of East Pakistan who served as the Pakistan Parliamentary secretary for foreign affairs.

== Biography ==
Bhuiya completed a B.A. from the University of Dhaka in 1940.

He was elected to the Provincial Assembly of East Pakistan in 1962.

Bhuiya was a member of the 4th National Assembly of Pakistan. He was the Pakistan Parliamentary secretary for foreign affairs.
