= Abdul Karim Sumar =

Pakistani politician

Abdul Karim Sumar (18 June 1922 – 20 February 1983) was a Pakistani industrialist and politician. He founded Mohammad Farooq Textile Mills in 1966 and served as a member of the 4th National Assembly of Pakistan and as chairman of the National Press Trust during the presidency of Ayub Khan.

== Life ==
Sumar began his career in 1940 by joining the Muslim League in Bombay. He co-founded the Bombay Provincial Muslim Students Federation in 1941 and helped organise Muslim students.

In 1958, following Ayub Khan's takeover, he and three other businessmen were arrested during a campaign requiring businessmen to declare concealed assets. Approximately one billion rupees in assets were reportedly declared that year. The four businessmen were accused of failing to declare all assets but were later released after the charges were found to be baseless, according to Sumar.
