= Md. Abdul Gafur =

Md. Abdul Gafur was a member of the 4th National Assembly of Pakistan as a representative of East Pakistan.

== Career ==
Gafur was a member of the 4th National Assembly of Pakistan representing Khulna-III.

Gafur was a veteran of the Bengali Language movement. He was elected to the Pakistan National Assembly in 1970.

Gafur was elected to the first parliament of Bangladesh following its independence in 1971. He was shot dead on 6 June 1972, the first member of parliament to be killed in Independence Bangladesh.
