= Parveen Haque Sikder =

Bangladeshi politician

- পারভীন হক সিকদার

Member of 11th Jatiya Sangsad of Reserved Seats for Women - 39
- In office 30 January 2019 – 10 January 2024
- Preceded by: Hazera Khatun

Personal details
- Born: 3 January 1963 (age 63)
- Party: Bangladesh Awami League
- Parent: Zainul Haque Sikder (father)

Parveen Haque Sikder, known as Parveen Sikder (born 3 January 1963) is a Bangladesh Awami League politician and a former Jatiya Sangsad member from the Women's Reserved Seat 39.

== Background ==
Sikder was born on 3 January 1963 in the village of Kartikpur, Bhedarganj to industrialist Zainul Haque Sikder (1930–2021), founding chairman of the Sikder Group of Companies. She has two brothers, Rick Haque Sikder and Ron Haque Sikder.

== Career ==
Sikder was elected to the parliament from a women's reserved seat as a Bangladesh Awami League candidate in 2019. She is a director of National Bank Limited.
