= Raheela Anwar =

Pakistani politician

Member of the Provincial Assembly of the Punjab
- In office 29 May 2013 – 31 May 2018
- Constituency: Reserved seat for women

Personal details
- Born: 20 February 1956 (age 70) Jhelum, Punjab, Pakistan
- Party: PTI (2013-present)
- Relatives: Malik Iqbal Mehdi Khan (brother)

Raheela Anwar (Urdu: راحیلہ انور; born 20 February 1956) is a Pakistani politician who was a Member of the Provincial Assembly of the Punjab, from May 2013 to May 2018.

== Early life and education ==
She was born on 20 February 1956 in Jhelum.

She has completed matriculation level education from Presentation Convent High School Jhelum.

== Political career ==
She was elected to the Provincial Assembly of the Punjab as a candidate of Pakistan Tehreek-e-Insaf on a reserved seat for women in the 2013 Pakistani general election.
