= Khan Fazle Rub Chowdhury =

Pakistani politician

Member of the 4th National Assembly of Pakistan
- Constituency: Bakerganj-II

Personal details
- Occupation: Politician

Khan Fazle Rub Chowdhury was a Member of the 4th National Assembly of Pakistan as a representative of East Pakistan.

== Career ==
Chowdhury was a Member of the 4th National Assembly of Pakistan representing Bakerganj-II.
