= Raisud-Din Ahmed =

Pakistani politician

Raisud-Din Ahmed was a Member of the 4th National Assembly of Pakistan as a representative of East Pakistan.

== Career ==
Ahmed was a Member of the 4th National Assembly of Pakistan representing Mymensingh-III.
