= Ismail Khan Castle =

Castle in Ilam Province, Iran

Ismail Khan castle
- قلعه اسماعیل‌خان

General information
- Type: Castle
- Location: Ilam County, Iran

Ismail Khan castle (Persian: قلعه اسماعیل‌خان) is a historical castle located in Ilam County in Ilam Province, The longevity of this fortress dates back to the Historical periods after Islam.
