= Awaluddin =

ʻAwaluddin (Arabic: أوّل الدين) is a Malayic masculine given name of Arabic origin. It is built from the Arabic words Awwal and Uddin. Notable people with this name include:

== People ==
- Awaludin (1916–1980), Indonesian actor
- Ahmad Awaluddin bin Ashaari (born 1981), Malaysian actor, model and television host
- Awaludin bin Said, Malaysian politician

== See also ==
- Abdul Awwal, a related Bengali masculine given name
