= Nurul Islam Sikder =

Bir Muktijoddha Nurul Islam Sikdar
- নূরুল ইসলাম সিকদার

Member of the National Assembly of Pakistan
- In office 1965–1969
- President: Ayub Khan
- Constituency: NE-23 (Bakerganj-VI)

Personal details
- Party: Awami League

Nurul Islam Sikder (Bengali: নূরুল ইসলাম সিকদার) was a Bangladeshi politician, freedom fighter and a former co-president of the Barguna branch of the Awami League. He was a member of the 3rd National Assembly of Pakistan.

== Biography ==
Sikder became a member of the 3rd National Assembly of Pakistan representing the NE-23 (Bakerganj-VI) constituency. During the Bangladesh Liberation War of 1971, he cooperated with Abdus Sattar of Betagi, Muhammad Zahir and others to liberate Barguna town from Pakistan in the morning of 27 November.
