= Abdul Awal Khan =

Pakistani politician

Abdul Awal Khan was a member of the 3rd National Assembly of Pakistan as a representative of East Pakistan.

== Biography ==
Khan was born in 1917 at Gaibandha in what was then Rangpur district. He graduated from Islamia College, Calcutta.

Khan was a member of the 3rd National Assembly of Pakistan, representing Rangpur-II. He was reelected in 1965 as a Muslim League candidate.
