= Azizur Rahman (Pakistani politician) =

Pakistani politician

Azizur Rahman was a member of the 3rd National Assembly of Pakistan as a representative of East Pakistan.

== Career ==
Rahman was a member of the 3rd National Assembly of Pakistan representing Comilla-II.

Rahman was the convenor of Comilla District Peace Committee formed in 1971.
