= Sikder Group =

Bangladeshi Business Group

- Type: Private
- Industry: Conglomerate
- Founded: 1950
- Founder: Zainul Haque Sikder
- Headquarters: Dhaka, Bangladesh
- Owner: Rick Haque Sikder

Sikder Group is a family-owned Bangladeshi business conglomerate. Zainul Haque Sikder founded the group in the early 1950s, and was its chairman at his death in 2021. His sons, Rick Haque Sikder and Ron Haque Sikder, became directors of the Sikder Group. Ron Haque Sikder died on 4 May 2026.

== History ==
Sikder Group started as a textile and garment manufacturing company.

PowerPac Holdings, a sister concern of the Sikder Group, got a contract to build a power plant from the Power Development Board in August 2011.

Its subsidiary PowerPac Ports Limited was given the government contract to operate two jetties in the Port of Mongla in 2016. The same year, PowerPac got approval from the Bangladesh Economic Zones Authority to operate Mongla Economic Zone in Bagerhat.

== Subsidiaries ==
- Sikder Apparel
- Sikder Creation
- Sikder Fashion Wear
- Sikder Apparel Hosiery
- Sikder Classic Dyeing & Knitting
- Sikder Computerized Label
- Sikder Accessories
- Sikder Salt Industries
- Sikder Insurance Company Limited
- Sikder Real Estate Ltd.
- PowerPac Holdings Ltd.
- PowerPac Ports
- PowerPac Economic Zone (Pvt.) Ltd.
- PowerPac Petroleum Limited
- PowerPac Steel Mills Limited
- R&R Holdings
- R&R Aviation
- Zainul Haque Sikder Women's Medical College
- Multiplex Holdings Ltd.
- Bangladesh Post (publication)
- Ajker Bangladesh Post (Bangla News portal)
- Bangabandhu Tri Tower (Iconic Tower of Bangladesh)

== Financial situation ==
At the end of 2016, the company's liabilities included about 2,000 crore Bangladeshi taka ($253M as of 2016) spread among three banks.

In late 2024, reports indicated that First Security Islami Bank had exposure to Sikder Group worth over Tk 2,254 crore, with a significant portion of the loan not classified properly.

On 28 September 2025, a court in Dhaka ordered the freezing of investments totaling 353 million Thai baht (approximately Tk 133 crore) made in seven Thai companies by the three children of former National Bank Chairman Zainul Haque Sikder.

== Controversies ==
Sikder Group has attracted attention from various law enforcement agencies around the world for having ties to criminal activities such as money laundering.

In 2010, the US state of California sued the group's carwash business for US$6.6 million for allegedly exploiting workers.

On 19 May 2020, Exim Bank (Bangladesh) filed a case against the group at Gulshan police station for allegedly shooting at and abducting the managing director and associate managing director of the bank. Following this filing, the main accused in the case, Ron Haque Sikder and Dipu Haque Sikder, fled the country in an air ambulance disguised as patients; they were later acquitted in a court verdict. Dhaka Metropolitan Magistrate Rajesh Chowdhury passed the order after the complainant in the case, Exim Bank Director Lt. Col. (retd.) Serajul Islam, told the court that he had no objection to the court accepting a police final report.

== See also ==
- List of companies of Bangladesh
