= Bhola Island =

Largest island of Bangladesh

Bhola
Nickname: Queen Island of Bangladesh
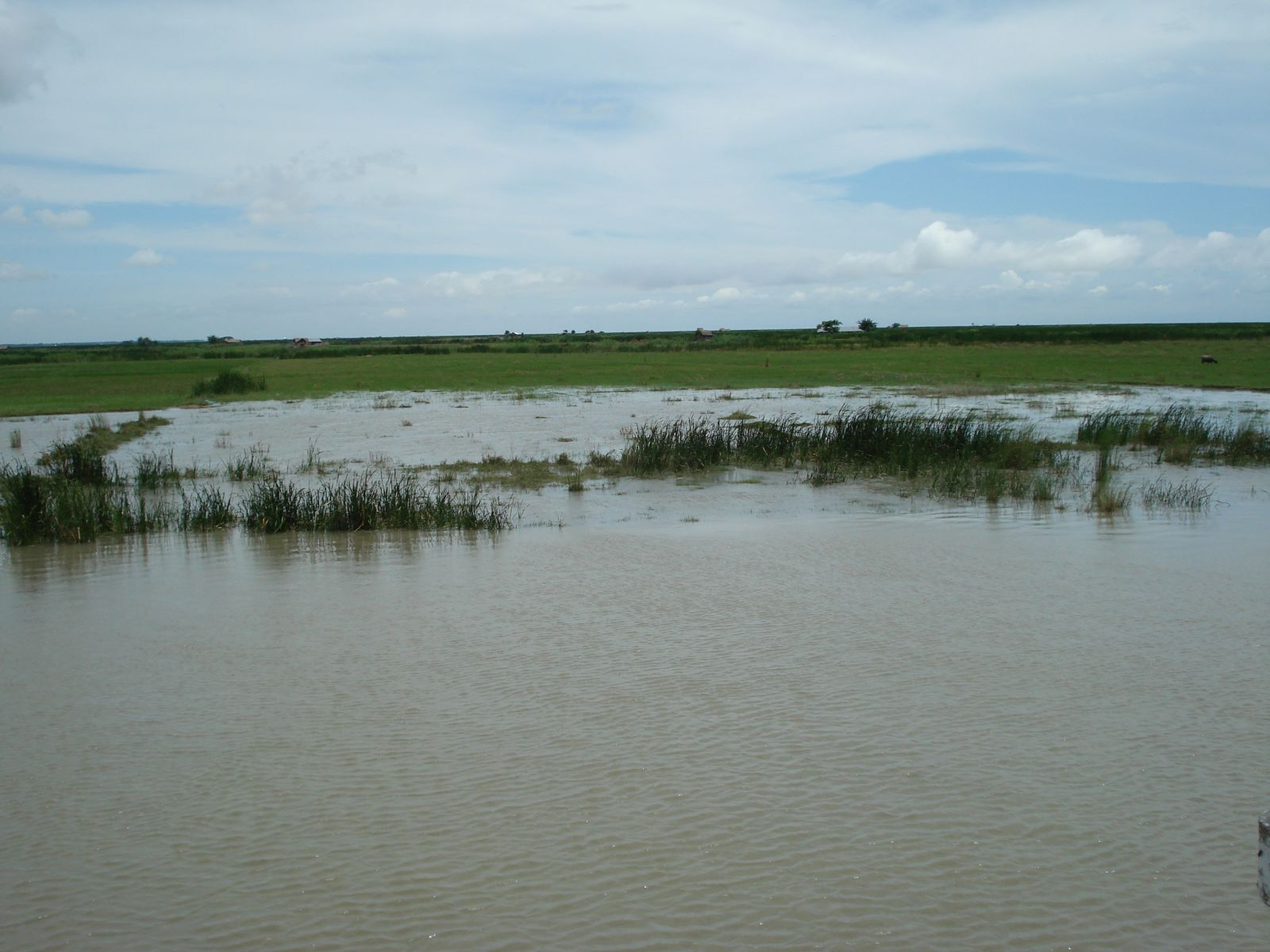
- River and flatlands of Bhola

- Location within Bangladesh

Geography
- Location: Bay of Bengal
- Coordinates: 22°30′N 90°45′E
- Area: 1,295 km^{2} (500 sq mi)
- Length: 90 km (56 mi)
- Width: 25 km (15.5 mi)
- Coastline: 550 km (342 mi)
- Highest elevation: 10 m (30 ft)
- Highest point: Unnamed

Administration
- Bangladesh
- Division: Barisal Division
- District: Bhola District
- Largest settlement: Bhola

Demographics
- Demonym: Bholaiya
- Population: 1,800,000 (2020)
- Pop. density: 1,078/km^{2} (2792/sq mi)
- Languages: Bengali (Eastern/Vaṅga dialect); English (Banglish); Thar
- Ethnic groups: Bengalis; Bede

Additional information
- Time zone: Bangladesh Standard Time (UTC+6)

Bhola Island (also called Dakhin Shahbazpur) is the largest island of Bangladesh with an area of 1,295 km^{2} (500 sq mi) and a coastline of 324 km (201 mi). It accounts for most of the land area of Bhola District in Barisal Division.

== Geography ==
It is situated at the mouth of the Meghna River. There are ferry and launch services from Dhaka and Barisal.

Map of the Bhola District which includes Bhola Island.

The island is 130 kilometres (81 miles) long and has a population of 1.7 million. A 1776 map indicates that it was oval-shaped yet it is currently more elongated because of erosion by the Meghna River. It is only 6 feet (1.8 m) above ocean level at the most elevated point.

Due to its low elevation, large parts of the island have already been inundated by sea level rise, and the island is at serious risk of disappearing entirely.

== Culture ==
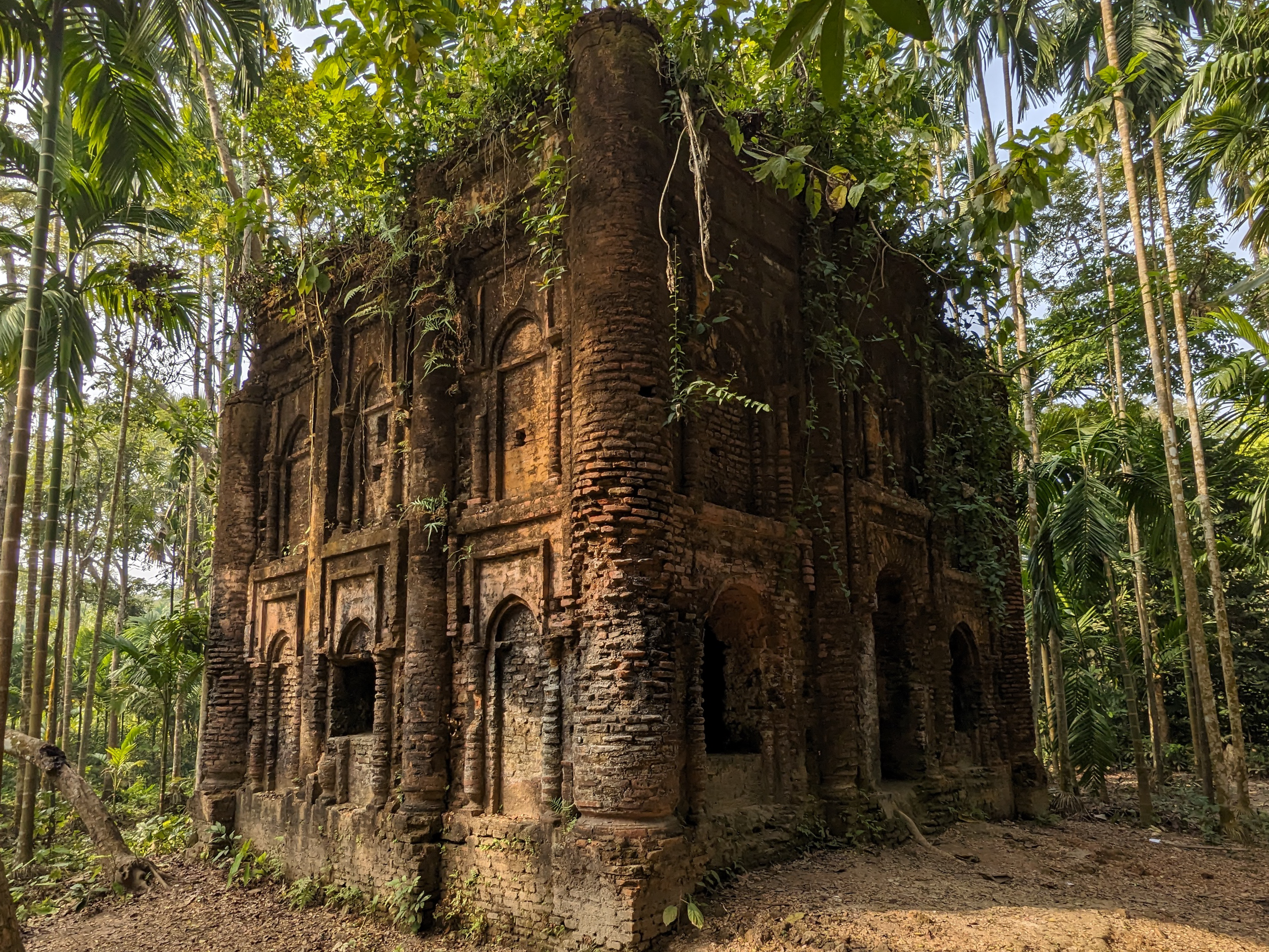
Mughal-era mosque near Majhi Bari, South Dighaldi Union of Bhola Island.

According to the 2011 census, 96.7% are Muslim, 3.3% are Hindu.

Bhola Island is known for its Buffalo curd (doi) which is unique in Bangladesh. The process that has been used has remained unchanged. It is made in traditional clay pots and the process takes 18 hours. It is popular in the Island and is served in special occasions such as weddings, festivals and other special occasions.

== Energy ==
The Island has faced chronic power issues, although natural gas was discovered in Shahbazpur in 1994. The government decided to build a power plant which is expected to fully operational by August 2015. The state-owned Power Grid Company of Bangladesh (PGCB) is installing a high voltage transmission line from Bhola Island to Borhanuddin Island.

== Media ==
There are 14 community radio stations on air.

== History ==
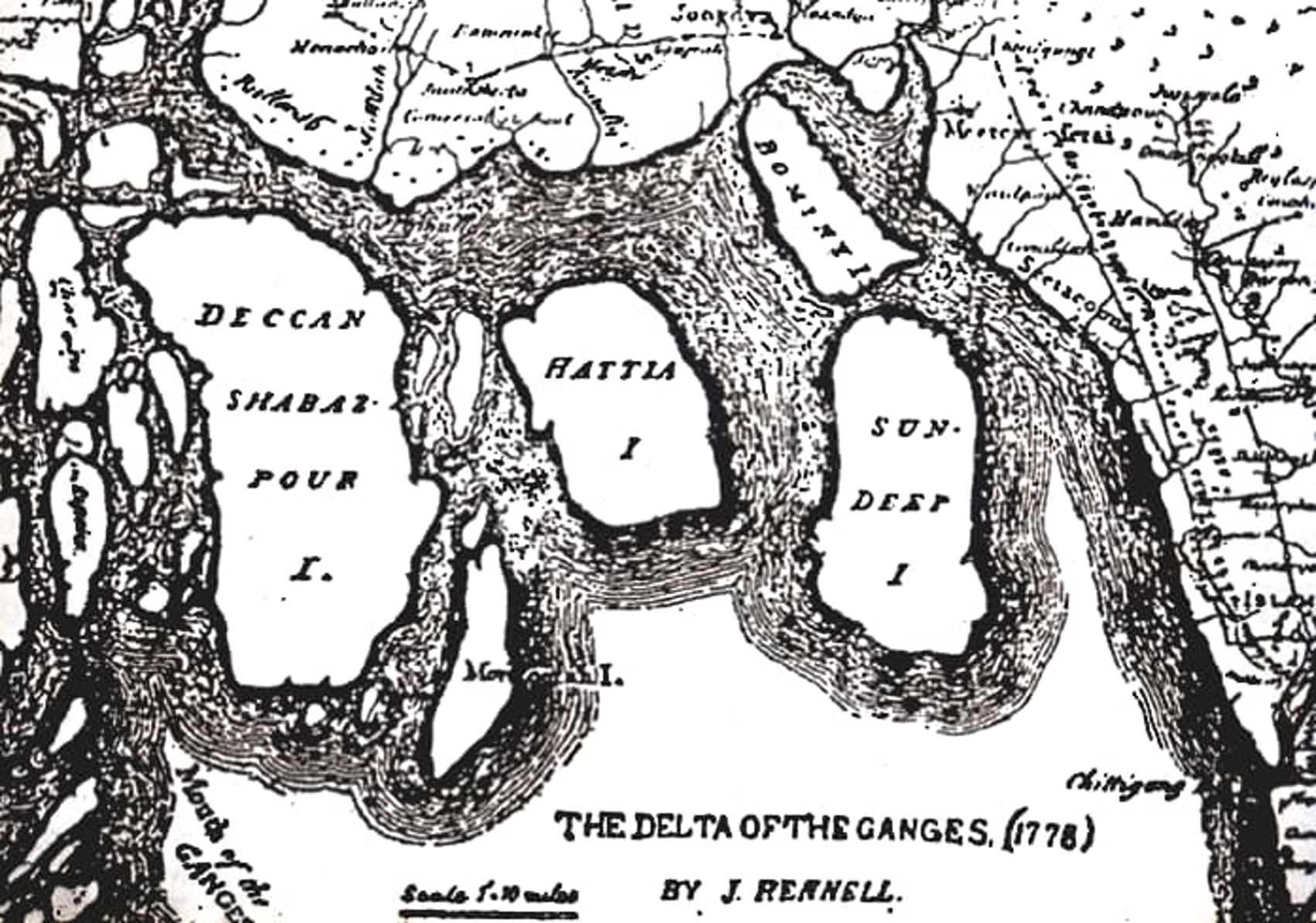
South Shahbajpur Island (marked as DECCAN SHABAZPOUR I.) which is now Bhola Island in 1778 map by James Rennell

In 1970, it was affected by the devastating Bhola cyclone which completely devastated the southern half of the island and also destroyed the rice crop.

In October 1975, it was home to the last human being naturally infected with Variola major, the more virulent of the two types of smallpox. When a toddler named Rahima Banu became infected with the virus, the World Health Organization sent a team to vaccinate 18,150 individuals who lived within a 1.5-mile radius of her home, which prevented the spread of the virus and eliminated it.

In 1995, half of the island became flooded, leaving 500,000 people homeless.

In 2005, floods affected over half a million people on the island. Significant floods in the months and years before had caused severe erosion and led to a number of rivers overflowing. As of 2009 a number of the island's inhabitants were living in the slums of Dhaka.

== See also ==
- List of islands of Bangladesh
- List of sub-districts in Bhola
