= List of prime ministers of Pakistan =

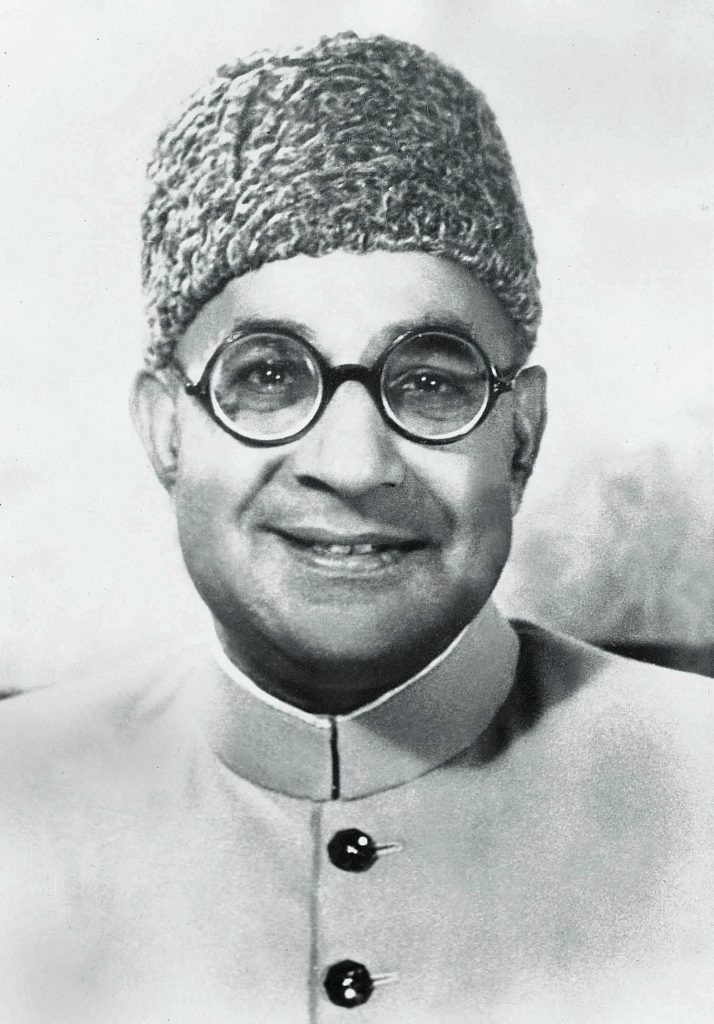
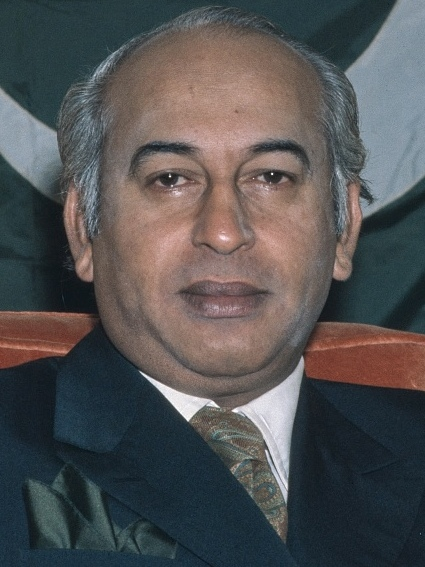
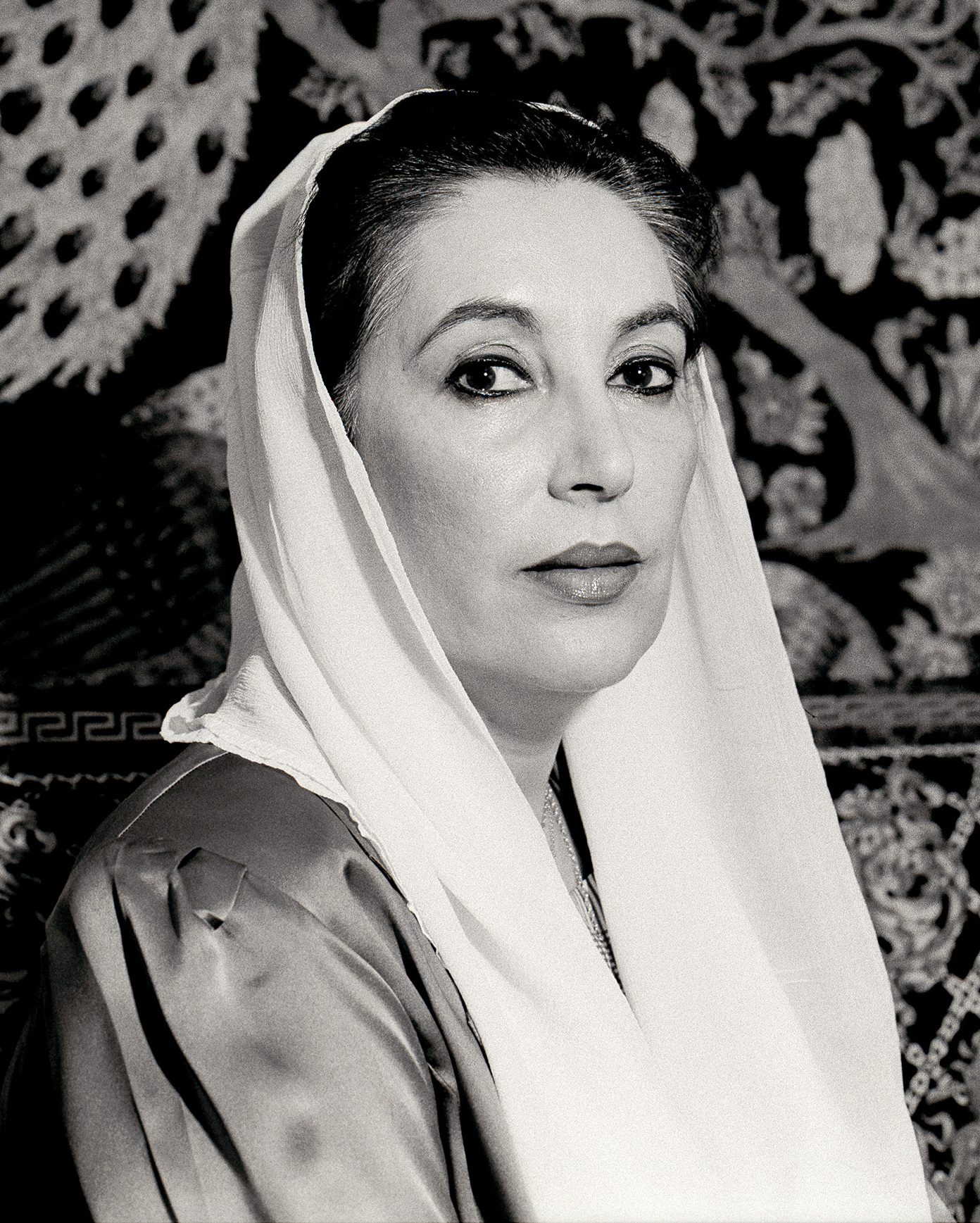
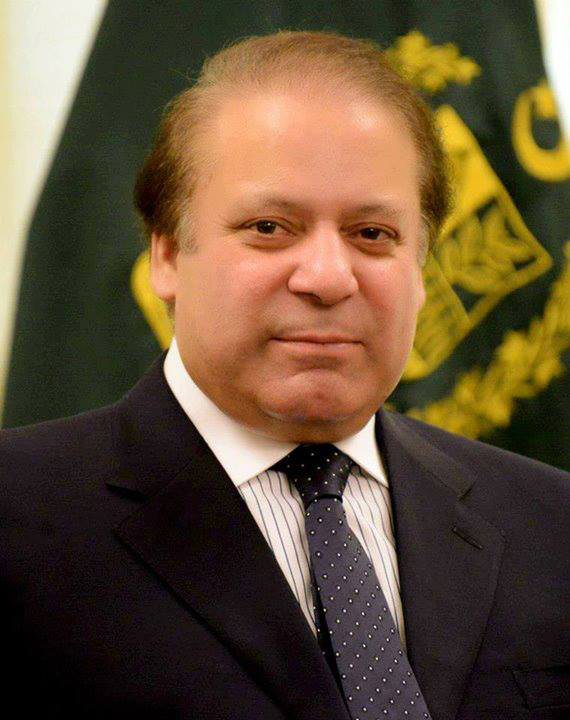
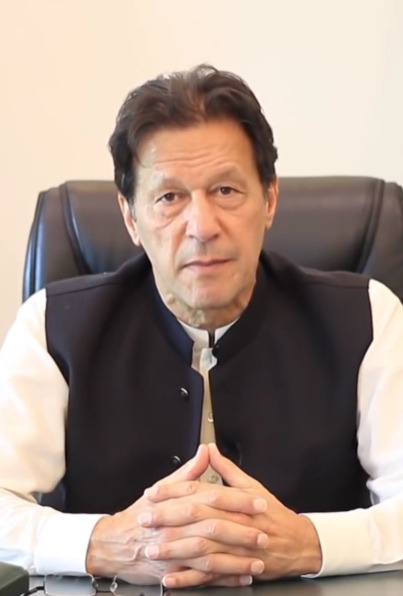
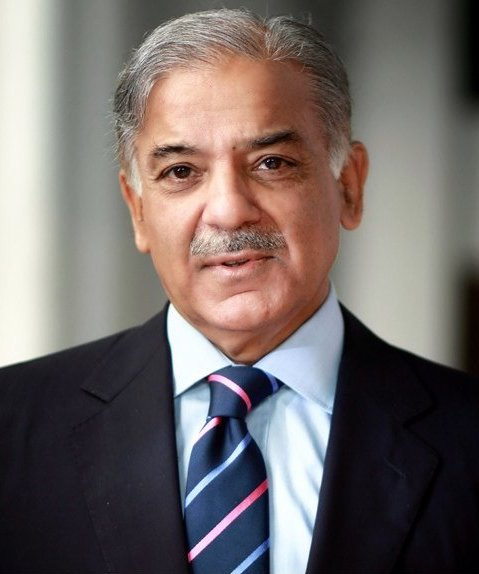
- Top left: Liaquat Ali Khan was the first prime minister of Pakistan since its inception.
- Top center: Zulfikar Ali Bhutto was the first prime minister to have been democratically elected as he was in 1977.
- Top right: Benazir Bhutto was Pakistan's first and only female prime minister.
- Bottom left: Nawaz Sharif is the longest serving non-consecutive prime minister, having served a total of 9 years in his 3 incomplete terms.
- Bottom center: Imran Khan was the country's 22nd (Note: Excluding caretaker Prime Minister's, Khan was the 19th Prime Minister.) prime minister and is recognized as a popular global figure.
- Bottom right: Shehbaz Sharif is the incumbent prime minister of Pakistan.

The prime minister of Pakistan (Note: Urdu: وزير اعظم, romanized: Wazīr ē Aʿẓam, lit. 'Grand Vizier', Urdu pronunciation: [ʋəˈziːɾˌeː ˈɑː.zəm]) is the head of the Government of Pakistan. The prime minister is vested with the responsibility of running the administration through his appointed federal cabinet, formulating national and foreign policies to ensure the safeguard of the interests of the nation and its people through the Council of Common Interests as well as making the decision to call nationwide general elections for the bicameral Parliament of Pakistan.

Since 1947, Pakistan has had 20 prime ministers, aside from the appointed caretaker prime ministers who were only mandated to oversee the system until the election process was finished. In Pakistan's parliamentary system, the prime minister is sworn in by the president and usually is the chairman or the president of the party or coalition that has a majority in the National Assembly– the lower house of Pakistan Parliament.

After the partition of British India on the midnight of 14/15 August 1947, Pakistan followed the British system by creating the post of prime minister based at the Prime Minister's Secretariat. The then governor-general of Pakistan, Muhammad Ali Jinnah, took advice from the Founding Fathers of the nation and appointed Liaquat Ali Khan to establish and lead his administration on 15 August 1947. Before the presidential system in 1960, seven prime ministers had served between 1947 until martial law in 1958. In 1971, the office was again revived but ceased to exist shortly. Executive powers and authority was given to the prime minister when the full set of the Constitution of Pakistan was promulgated in 1973 but the post was ceased from its effective operations after another martial law in 1977. After the general elections held in 1985, the office came to its existence. During 1985 to 1997 executive powers were share between presidents and prime ministers due to 8th amendment to Constitution. In 1997, 13th amendment were passed and prime minister again got executive powers. Between 1988 and 1999, the office was held by Benazir Bhutto of the Pakistan People's Party and Nawaz Sharif of Pakistan Muslim League (N), each holding the office for two non-consecutive terms between 1988 and 1999: Bhutto during 1988–90 and 1993–96; and Sharif during 1990–93 and 1997–99.

After the general elections held in 2002, Zafarullah Khan Jamali was invited to form his administration as its prime minister. After the Supreme Court of Pakistan's ruling to disqualify Prime Minister Yusuf Raza Gilani in 2012, the business of his administration was looked after by Raja Pervez Ashraf until the caretaker administration was set up under Mir Hazar Khan Khoso.

Nurul Amin of the Muslim League had the shortest term, at 13 days. Yusuf Raza Gilani of the Pakistan Peoples Party had the longest consecutive term of 4 years and 86 days. At approximately 9 years and 179 days in total, Nawaz Sharif of Pakistan Muslim League (N) has been the longest-serving prime minister for a non-consecutive term. Sharif was re-elected for a third non-consecutive term on 5 June 2013, which is a record in the history of Pakistan. No prime minister of Pakistan has yet served their full five-year term.

== Key ==
Key for prime ministers list
Party name
Muslim League / Pakistan Muslim League
Awami League
Republican Party
Peoples Party
National Peoples Party
Muslim League (N)
Muslim League (Q)
Tehreek-e-Insaf
Independent

== List ==
List of prime ministers of Pakistan
No.	Portrait	Name	Took office	Left office	Tenure	Elections	Political party (Alliance)	Note(s)	Government	
No.	Portrait	Name	Took office	Left office	Tenure	Elections	Political party (Alliance)	Note(s)	National Assembly	Coalition (Note: This includes both Members of Government as well as Confidence and supply)
1		Liaquat Ali Khan نوابزادہ لیاقت علی خان (1895–1951)	14 August 1947	16 October 1951 X	4 years, 63 days	–	Muslim League	Following advice given by the Founding Fathers of the nation, Governor-General Muhammad Ali Jinnah appointed and invited the Finance Minister Liaquat Ali Khan to set up and run his administration in 1947. He was assassinated in 1951, and Khawaja Nazimuddin took the office.	1st	—N/a
2		Sir Khawaja Nazimuddin خواجہ ناظم الدین (1894–1964)	17 October 1951	17 April 1953	1 year, 182 days	–	Muslim League	Nazimuddin became Prime Minister of Pakistan after the assassination of Liaquat Ali Khan in 1951. He left the office when Governor-General Malik Ghulam Muhammad dissolved his government in 1953.	1st	—N/a
3		Mohammad Ali Bogra محمد علی بوگرہ (1909–1963)	17 April 1953	12 August 1955	2 years, 117 days	—	Muslim League	A diplomat and relatively unknown personality to Pakistani politics, Bogra established the Ministry of Talents but his administration was dismissed in 1955 by the Governor-General after the legislative elections in 1954.	2nd	—N/a
4		Chaudhry Mohammad Ali چوہدری محمد علی (1905–1982)	12 August 1955	12 September 1956	1 year, 31 days	—	Muslim League	Prior to becoming prime minister, Ali was a prominent bureaucrat. He resigned due to internal conflict in his party.	2nd	ML • AL • RP
5		Huseyn Shaheed Suhrawardy حسین شہید سہروردی (1892–1963)	12 September 1956	17 October 1957	1 year, 35 days	—	Awami League	Popular for his wit in law, Suhrwardy resigned due to the loss of control over his party and support from the coalition partners in his administration.	2nd	—N/a
6		Ibrahim Ismail Chundrigar ابراہیم اسماعیل چندریگر (1897–1960)	17 October 1957	11 December 1957	55 days	—	Muslim League	Third shortest-tenured Prime Minister, Chundrigar established his administration but was removed a mere 55 days into his term amid a vote of no-confidence movement led by majority votes of the Republican Party and Awami League.	2nd	ML • KSP • NIP
7		Sir Feroze Khan Noon فیروز خان نون (1893–1970)	16 December 1957	7 October 1958	295 days	—	Republican Party	A lawyer, Sir Feroze Khan's administration collapsed after his party's own President Iskander Mirza enforced martial law in 1958 in a view of extending his term of office	2nd	—N/a
	Office vacant 8 October 1958 – 6 December 1971 (Note: In early October 1958, President Iskandar Ali Mirza imposed martial law, which vacated the seat of the prime minister. Three weeks later, General Ayub Khan took over as military president, ousting President Mirza through his coup d'état. He ruled as an authoritarian president until the 1968–69 Pakistan revolution. Field Marshal Ayub Khan handed over powerto General Yahya Khan in 1969, who once more imposed martial law and became an authoritarian military president, though near the end of his reign, he finally re-established the prime minister's seat by appointing Nurul Amin.)									
8		Nurul Amin نور الامین (1893–1974)	7 December 1971	20 December 1971	13 days	1970	Pakistan Muslim League	Shortest-tenured prime minister. After the general elections in 1971, Amin was invited to be appointed as prime minister under Yahya administration; he was also the first and the only vice president of Pakistan from 1970 to 1972, leading Pakistan in the Indo-Pakistani War of 1971.	5th	—N/a
	Office vacant 21 December 1971 – 13 August 1973 (Note: Following the 1971 Secession of Bangladesh, Military President Yahya Khan resigned and handed over power to Zulfikar Ali Bhutto. Despite being a civilian, he ruled as chief martial law administrator and declared himself Emergency President rather than prime minister, continuing the presidential system before re-establishing the parliamentary system in 1973.)									
9		Zulfikar Ali Bhutto ذولفقار علی بھٹو (1928–1979)	14 August 1973	5 July 1977	3 years, 325 days	1977	Pakistan Peoples Party	Bhutto resigned as president to become the empowered prime minister after the Constitution was repromulgated, which established a parliamentary system of government. He was deposed in the martial law in 1977 by his appointed army chief, General Zia, in July 1977.	6th	—N/a
	Office vacant 6 July 1977 – 23 March 1985 (Note: Martial law was imposed once more following the 1977 Pakistani military coup, in which General Zia-ul-Haq declared himself as military ruler and president. The post of prime minister was therefore abolished for 8 years in his Zia's presidency until he appointed Junejo in 1985.)									
10		Muhammad Khan Junejo محمد خان جنیجو (1932–1993)	24 March 1985	29 May 1988	3 years, 66 days	1985	Independent	Junejo was elected as the tenth Prime Minister of Pakistan in non-party based elections in 1985, therefore he was elected on an independent ticket but he served the Pakistan Muslim League while before entering in office and during office. He was dismissed by the president as per the Eighth Amendment to the Constitution.	7th	—N/a
	Office vacant 30 May 1988 – 1 December 1988 (Note: Following Junejo's dismissal by Zia-ul-Haq, Zia did not appoint a replacement prime minister. Zia died in August 1988, after which Ghulam Ishaq Khan became President. The office was left vacant until Benazir's election.)									
11		Benazir Bhutto بے نظیر بھٹو (1953–2007)	2 December 1988	6 August 1990	1 year, 247 days	1988	Pakistan Peoples Party	Bhutto became the first woman in Pakistan to head a major political party, in 1982. Six years later, she became the first woman elected to lead a Muslim state. President Ghulam Ishaq Khan dissolved her government using article 58-2b of Constitution.	8th	—N/a
	Office vacant 6 August 1990 – 6 November 1990 (Note: Ghulam Mustafa Jatoi was appointed as the first Caretaker Prime Minister of Pakistan to oversee elections in 1990. He formed a caretaker administration and served the required interim period of exactly 3 months.)									
12		Nawaz Sharif میاں محمد نواز شریف (born 1949)	6 November 1990	18 July 1993	2 years, 254 days	1990	Islami Jamhoori Ittehad	Sharif was elected as the 12th prime minister of Pakistan on 1 November 1990. President Ghulam Ishaq Khan dissolved his government in April 1993, which was later on reinstated by the Supreme Court of Pakistan. Sharif survived a serious constitutional crisis when President Khan attempted to dismiss him under article 58-2b, in April 1993, but he successfully challenged the decision in the Supreme Court. Sharif resigned from the post negotiating a settlement that resulted in the removal of President as well, in July 1993.	9th	PML-N • JI • NPP • NeM • MJAH
	Office vacant 18 July 1993 – 19 October 1993 (Note: Moeenuddin Ahmad Qureshi was appointed as the Caretaker Prime Minister of Pakistan to oversee elections in 1993. He formed a caretaker administration and served the required interim period of around 3 months.)									
(11)		Benazir Bhutto بے نظیر بھٹو (1953–2007)	19 October 1993	5 November 1996	3 years, 17 days	1993	Pakistan Peoples Party	Bhutto was re-elected for a second term, in 1993. She survived an attempted coup d'état in 1995. Bhutto's government was dismissed by president Farooq Leghari in November 1996.	10th	—N/a
	Office vacant 5 November 1996 – 17 February 1997 (Note: Malik Meraj Khalid was appointed as the Caretaker Prime Minister of Pakistan to oversee elections in early 1997. He served the required interim period of around 3 months.)									
(12)		Nawaz Sharif میاں محمد نواز شریف (born 1949)	17 February 1997	12 October 1999	2 years, 237 days	1997	Pakistan Muslim League (N)	Sharif was re-elected as prime minister, with an exclusive mandate from all over Pakistan for a non-consecutive second term, in February 1997. His government was deposed by General Pervez Musharraf in October 1999, and martial law was imposed in the entire country.	11th	—N/a
	Office vacant 13 October 1999 – 22 November 2002 (Note: Military General Pervez Musharraf overthrew Sharif’s government in the 1999 Pakistani coup d'état and declared himself Chief Executive before declaring himself President of Pakistan in 2001. Despite general elections in 2002, Musharraf still remained in power, with Zafarullah Khan Jamali, Shujaat Hussain and Shaukat Aziz’s tenures being heavily influenced by Musharraf who remained President until 2008.)									
13		Mir Zafarullah Khan Jamali میر ظفر اللہ خان جمالی (1944–2020)	23 November 2002	26 June 2004	1 year, 216 days	2002	Pakistan Muslim League (Q)	Jamali was elected as the Prime Minister of Pakistan in November 2002. He continued the foreign and economic policies of Pervez Musharraf but could not complete his term and resigned from the post in June 2004.	12th	PML-Q • PPPP • MQM • MMA
14		Chaudhry Shujaat Hussain چوہدری شجاعت حسین (born 1946)	30 June 2004	23 August 2004	54 days	—	Pakistan Muslim League (Q)	Second shortest-tenured Prime Minister. He was elected by the Parliament and served a 54-day period before Shaukat Aziz replaced him.	12th	PML-Q • PPPP • MQM • MMA
15		Shaukat Aziz شوکت عزیز (born 1949)	28 August 2004	15 November 2007	3 years, 79 days	—	Pakistan Muslim League (Q)	Aziz took the office of Prime Minister of Pakistan in August 2004. He left the office at the end of the parliamentary term, in November 2007, and became the first Prime Minister of Pakistan who left the seat after completion of parliamentary term.	12th	PML-Q • PPPP • MQM • MMA
(C)	Office vacant: served as caretaker prime minister in the interim period.	Muhammad Mian Soomro (born 1950) caretaker	15 November 2007	25 March 2008	4 months and 10 days	—	Pakistan Muslim League (Q)	Served as caretaker prime minister in the interim period.		
16		Yusuf Raza Gilani سید یوسف رضا گیلانی (born 1952)	25 March 2008	19 June 2012	4 years, 86 days	2008	Pakistan Peoples Party	Gillani was elected as prime minister in March 2008. He was disqualified from his seat in the parliament in April 2012 by the Supreme Court for contempt of court.	13th	PPP • PML-N • JUI(F) • MQM • ANP • PML-F (Note: The PML-N was part of the coalition at first but almost immediately left.)
17		Raja Pervaiz Ashraf راجا پرویز اشرف (born 1950)	22 June 2012	24 March 2013	275 days	–	Pakistan Peoples Party	Ashraf assumed the post of prime minister in June 2012, after Yousaf Raza Gillani was disqualified over contempt of court charges.	13th	PPP • PML-Q • JUI(F) • MQM • ANP • PML-F
(C)		Mir Hazar Khan Khoso (1929–2021) caretaker	24 March 2013	5 June 2013	2 months and 12 days	–	Independent	Served as caretaker prime minister in the interim period.		
(12)		Nawaz Sharif میاں محمد نواز شریف (born 1949)	5 June 2013	28 July 2017	4 years, 53 days	2013	Pakistan Muslim League (N)	On 5 June 2013, Sharif took office for a third non-consecutive term after winning 182/342 seats with clear majority. He was disqualified on 28 July 2017 by the Supreme Court of Pakistan as a result of the Panama Papers case.	14th	PML-N • NPP • PML-F
18		Shahid Khaqan Abbasi شاہد خاقان عباسی (born 1958)	1 August 2017	31 May 2018	303 days	—	Pakistan Muslim League (N)	Parliament elected Shahid Khaqan Abbasi as the Prime Minister after the impeachment of Nawaz Sharif. His term expired on 31 May 2018 alongside the dissolution of the National Assembly to facilitate a caretaker government in place until the 25 July general election.	14th	PML-N • NPP • PML-F
(C)		Nasirul Mulk (born 1950) caretaker	31 May 2018	18 August 2018	2 months and 18 days	—	Independent	Served as caretaker prime minister in the interim period.		
19		Imran Khan عمران خان (born 1952)	18 August 2018	10 April 2022	3 years, 235 days	2018	Pakistan Tehreek-e-Insaf	General elections were held on 25 July 2018, which resulted in the Pakistan Tehreek-e-Insaf winning 156 out of 342 seats, forming a coalition government of 177 members including the MQM, BAP and others. On 18 August, he was elected as Prime Minister of Pakistan. On 10 April 2022, a no-confidence vote was conducted and he was ousted from office.	15th	PTI • PML-Q • GDA • MQM-P • BAP • AML • JWP
20		Shehbaz Sharif میاں محمد شہباز شریف (born 1951)	11 April 2022	14 August 2023	1 year, 125 days	—	Pakistan Muslim League (N)	Shahbaz Sharif was elected Prime Minister of Pakistan after the successful no-confidence motion against Imran Khan. His nomination was supported by all joint opposition parties who voted to remove the previous prime minister from office.	15th	PML-N • PPP • MMA • MQM-P • BNP-M • BAP • PML-Q • ANP • JWP
(C)		Anwaar ul Haq Kakar (born 1971) caretaker	14 August 2023	4 March 2024	203 days	—	Balochistan Awami Party	Served as caretaker prime minister in the interim period.		
(20)		Shehbaz Sharif میاں محمد شہباز شریف (born 1951)	4 March 2024	Incumbent	2 years, 220 days	2024	Pakistan Muslim League (N)	Highly controversial general elections were held on 8 February 2024. The elections were contested for rigging, and Shehbaz Sharif was again elected as prime minister with the support of the MQM-P, BAP, PMLQ, IPP, NP and PMLZ, as well as confidence and supply from Pakistan Peoples Party.	16th	PML-N • IPP • MQM-P • NP • PML-Q • BAP • PML-Z • PPP

== List of prime ministers by length of term ==
Name	Party	Length of term	
Name	Party	Longest continuous term	Total years of premiership
Nawaz Sharif	Islami Jamhuri Ittihad / Muslim League (N)	4 years, 53 days	9 years, 179 days
Benazir Bhutto	Peoples Party	3 years, 17 days	4 years, 264 days
Yusuf Raza Gilani	Peoples Party	4 years, 86 days	4 years, 86 days
Liaquat Ali Khan	Muslim League	4 years, 63 days	4 years, 63 days
Shehbaz Sharif	Muslim League (N)	2 years, 220 days	3 years, 345 days
Zulfikar Ali Bhutto	Peoples Party	3 years, 325 days	3 years, 325 days
Imran Khan	Tehreek-e-Insaf	3 years, 235 days	3 years, 235 days
Shaukat Aziz	Muslim League (Q)	3 years, 79 days	3 years, 79 days
Muhammad Khan Junejo	Independent	3 years, 66 days	3 years, 66 days
Mohammad Ali Bogra	Muslim League	2 years, 117 days	2 years, 117 days
Mir Zafarullah Khan Jamali	Muslim League (Q)	1 year, 216 days	1 year, 216 days
Sir Khawaja Nazimuddin	Muslim League	1 year, 182 days	1 year, 182 days
Huseyn Shaheed Suhrawardy	Awami League	1 year, 35 days	1 year, 35 days
Chaudhry Mohammad Ali	Muslim League	1 year, 31 days	1 year, 31 days
Shahid Khaqan Abbasi	Muslim League (N)	303 days	303 days
Sir Feroz Khan Noon	Republican Party	295 days	295 days
Raja Pervaiz Ashraf	Peoples Party	275 days	275 days
Anwaar ul Haq Kakar	Balochistan Awami Party	203 days	203 days
Muhammad Mian Soomro	Muslim League (Q)	131 days	131 days
Moeenuddin Ahmad Qureshi	Independent	124 days	124 days
Malik Meraj Khalid	Independent	104 days	104 days
Ghulam Mustafa Jatoi	National Peoples Party	92 days	92 days
Nasirul Mulk	Independent	79 days	79 days
Mir Hazar Khan Khoso	Independent	73 days	73 days
Ibrahim Ismail Chundrigar	Muslim League	55 days	55 days
Chaudhry Shujaat Hussain	Muslim League (Q)	54 days	54 days
Balakh Sher Mazari	Peoples Party	38 days	38 days
Nurul Amin	Pakistan Muslim League	13 days	13 days

Key

- : Caretaker Prime Minister
