= First Benazir Bhutto government =

Pakistani government formed in 1988

First Benazir Bhutto Government
- 29th Cabinet of Pakistan

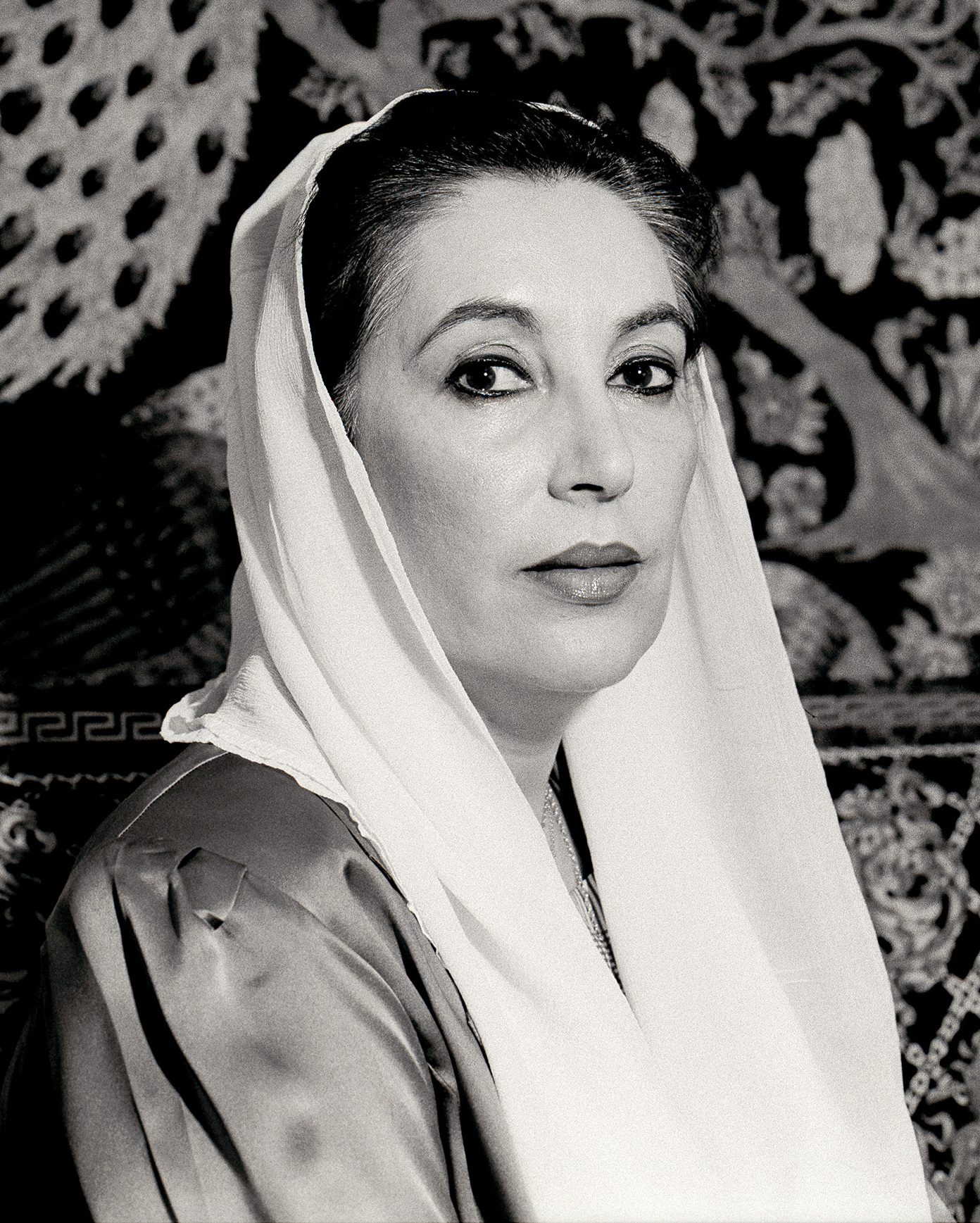
- Date formed: 2 December 1988
- Date dissolved: 6 August 1990

People and organisations
- Head of state: Ghulam Ishaq Khan
- Head of government: Benazir Bhutto
- Total no. of members: 58
- Member party: Pakistan People's Party
- Status in legislature: Minority (Plurality)
- Opposition party: Islami Jamhoori Ittehad
- Opposition leader: Nawaz Sharif

History
- Election: 1988 general elections
- Outgoing election: 1990 general elections
- Outgoing formation: Jatoi caretaker government
- Predecessor: Zia government
- Successor: First Nawaz Sharif government

The first Benazir Bhutto government was formed on 2 December 1988 following general elections held in 1988. Due to the PPP only securing a plurality, the new government forged a coalition alliance with the MQM, ANP, JUI(FR) and other additional independents. Following elections President Ghulam Ishaq Khan called upon Benazir Bhutto, later announcing the formation of a new government. Benazir promised while taking oath on 2 December to eradicate illiteracy, poverty, restore student unions, liberate political prisoners, provide equal rights to women and free the media. However, the Army's continued influence and lack of a legislative majority led to her later declaring her government's freedom of action was "institutionally, economically, politically (and) structurally" constrained. Later during Presidential elections the same year, Benazir Bhutto solidified her alliance with President Ishaq Khan through supporting his bid for re-election. However later the two came into conflict, over the division of powers between the two offices and as the President continued to support Bhutto's opponent Nawaz Sharif. Eventually on 6 August 1990 Ghulam Ishaq Khan issued an order under Article 58(2)(b) dissolving the National Assembly causing the Prime Minister and the cabinet to cease holding office. The stated charges of dismissal for the Bhutto government were corruption and the deteriorating law and order situation in Sindh.

== History ==
=== Formative Period ===
Following the 1988 elections, the PPP did not gain a majority but emerged as the largest single party with 93 seats, 11 seats short to form a majority. The second largest party in the National assembly being the IJI and its 55 seats. Independents had secured 23 seats, MQM 13 seats, and JUI (Fazlur-Rehman Group) 7 seats. Nawaz Sharif the following day announced that the IJI would form a government, according to Hamid Khan, Sharif intended to make up for his lack of an electoral plurality through the support of the President Ghulam Ishaq Khan. Following MQM and ANP alliance with the PPP, the President instead decided to call upon Benazir to meet with him, and shortly later it was announced that the first civilian-led government in eleven years was to be formed. According to Lawrence Ziring, Ishaq Khan pursued this path in order to establish stability "as quickly as possible" and because he was disinclined to see the army under Aslam Beg take control of the government following Zia's death. Hamid Khan claims that Ghulam Ishaq Khan sought a full five-year term as President, so after "delivering a majority in the Provincial Assembly of the Punjab to the IJI" to counterbalance Bhutto he sought a deal with the PPP for his election. In the later Presidential elections that year, the PPP ignored its old ally Nawabzada Nasrullah for Ishaq Khan, who won with 603 votes out of 752.

=== Formation Provincial Governments ===
==== Punjab ====
The Islami Jamhoori Ittehad in Punjab would be able to secure 34.98% of the vote. Despite the PPP (52 seats) securing more seats than the IJI (45 seats) in the National Assembly, in the Provincial Assembly the IJI secured got 108 seats compared to the PPP's 94. With the help of most of the independents the IJI would be able to form a government with Nawaz Sharif as Chief Minister. Punjab would provide the main power base of the IJI, comprising both Nawaz Sharif and Junejo Muslim leagues and eight other allied parties held together by opposition to the PPP. According to Muhammad Waseem, the incumbent caretaker Chief Ministers used public funds to finance its candidates during the election. According to Ian Talbot, the requirement that voters produce identity cards also strengthened the IJI.

==== Sindh ====
In Sindh the PPP had won 67 out of a 100 general seats in the Provincial Assembly, securing a majority. Out of 31 independents in the Assembly, 26 belonged to the MQM but ran on independent tickets. On 20 March, the period until with which Governors could appoint Chief Ministers had lapsed, hence Qaim Ali Shah of the PPP was elected by the Provincial Assembly as Chief Minister of Sindh.

==== North West Frontier Province (NWFP) ====
In the NWFP no single political party had won an absolute majority. Out of 80 general seats the IJI had won the highest (28 seats), followed by the PPP (22 seats), ANP (13 seats) and as many as 15 independents. In order to form a government, Benazir approached Wali Khan head of the ANP to form a coalition, with the offer being accepted. Several independents also joined the PPP-ANP in NWFP. Aftab Sherpao would form the government as Chief Minister. Later when the PPP-ANP coalition broke down he would remain as CM.

==== Balochistan ====
In Balochistan, out of 40 general seats, 11 went to JUI(FR), 10 to the Balochistan National Alliance (BNA), 8 to the IJI, 4 to the PPP and the remaining seven to minor political parties and independents. The Provincial Assembly met on 2 December to elect the Speaker and Deputy Speaker of the assembly and later to elect the Chief Minister of the province. Mir Zafarullah Khan Jamali received 21 votes for and 21 votes against his bid for Chief Ministership. The Speaker issued a certificate declaring him elected by 22 votes including the casting vote of the speaker.

== Cabinet ==
=== Head of State and Government ===
President of Pakistan	Prime Minister of Pakistan
Ghulam Ishaq Khan 1988-1993	Benazir Bhutto (Note: Held Defense and Finance portfolios and headed the Cabinet Secretariat.) 1988-1990

=== Federal Ministers ===
Federal Ministers under Benazir Bhutto
	Name	Portfolio	Period	Citation
1	Begum Nusrat Bhutto	● Senior Minister without portfolio	31 March 1989—6 August 1990	
2	Syed Faisal Saleh Hayat	● Federal Minister of Commerce, Local Govt & Rural Development Industries	4 December 1988—6 August 1990	
3	Makhdoom Amin Faheem	● Federal Minister of Communications ● Federal Minister of Railways	4 December 1988—6 August 1990 6 December 1988—23 March 1989	
4	Agha Tariq Khan	● Federal Minister for Culture & Tourism ● Federal Minister for Culture & Supports	4 December 1988—23 March 1989 30 March 1989—6 August 1990	
5	Rao Sikandar Iqbal	● Federal Minister for Food, Agriculture and Cooperatives	4 December 1988—6 August 1990	
6	Sahabzada Yaqub Khan	● Federal Minister of Foreign Affairs	4 December 1988—6 August 1990	
7	Syed Amir Haider Kazmi	● Federal Minister of Health, Special Education and Social welfare ● Federal Minister of Education	4 December 1988—6 August 1990 6 December 1988—23 March 1989	
8	Jahangir Badr	● Federal Minister for Housing and Works ● Federal Minister of Science & Technology ● Federal Minister of Petroleum & Natural Resources	4 December 1988—23 March 1989 4 December 1988—20 September 1989 6 December 1988—6 August 1990	
9	Aitzaz Ahsan	● Federal Minister of Interior ● Federal Minister of Law and Justice	4 December 1988—6 August 1990 4 December 1988—28 December 1988	
10	Mukhtar Ahmad Awan	● Federal Minister of Labour Manpower & Overseas Pakistanis ● Federal Minister of Labour	4 December 1988—11 November 1989 11 November 1989—6 August 1990	
11	Muhammad Hanif Khan	● Federal Minister of States and Frontier Regions & Kashmir Affairs ● Federal Minister of Housing & Works	4 December 1988—23 March 1989 4 December 1988—28 January 1990	
12	Syed Iftikhar Hussain Gillani	● Federal Minister of Law and Justice	28 December 1988—6 August 1990	
13	Farooq Ahmed Khan Leghari	● Federal Minister of Water and Power	28 December 1988—6 August 1990	
14	Syed Ghulam Mustafa Shah	● Federal Minister of Education	23 March 1989—6 August 1990	
15	Zafar Ali Leghari	● Federal Minister of Railways	23 March 1989—6 August 1990	
16	Ali Nawaz Shah	● Federal Minister of Industries	23 March 1989—6 August 1990	
17	Khan Bahadar Khan	● Federal Minister of Religious Affairs & Minorities Affairs	23 March 1989—6 August 1990	
18	Khawaja Tariq Rahim	● Federal Minister of Parliamentary Affairs	23 March 1989—6 August 1990	
19	Baz Muhammad Khan Khetran	● Federal Minister of States & Frontier Regions and Kashmir Affairs ● Federal Minister of Environment and Urban Affairs ● Federal Minister of Kashmir Affairs & Northern Affairs	23 March 1989—28 January 1990 28 January 1990—6 August 1990 10 September 1989—28 January 1990	
20	Rehana Sarwar	● Federal Minister of Women Development	23 March 1989—6 August 1990	
21	Syed Yousaf Raza Gilani	● Federal Minister of Tourism ● Federal Minister of Housing & Works (Works Division)	21 March 1989—28 January 1990 28 January 1990—6 August 1990	
22	Mian Ghulam Mohammad Ahmad Khan Maneka	● Federal Minister of Manpower & Overseas Pakistanis	11 November 1989—6 August 1990	

=== Ministers of State ===
Ministers of State under Benazir Bhutto
	Name	Portfolio	Period	Citation
1	Mir. Baz Muhammad Khan Khetran	Minister of State for Culture and Tourism	4 December 1988–23 March 1989	
2	Ghulam Sarwar Cheema	Minister of State for Defence	4 December 1988–6 August 1990	
3	Ehsan-ul-Haq Piracha	Minister of State for Finance, Economic Affairs, Planning & Development	4 December 1988–6 August 1990	
4	Javed Jabbar	Minister of State for Information & Broadcasting; Minister of State for Science & Technology	4 December 1988–20 September 1989 20 September 1989–6 August 1990	
5	Khawaja Tariq Rahim	Minister of State for Parliamentary Affairs; Minister of State for & Power	4 December 1988–23 March 1989 6 December 1988–23 March 1989	
6	Raja Shahid Zafar	Minister of State for Production	4 December 1988–6 August 1990	
7	Khan Bahadar Khan	Minister of State for Religious Affairs & Minorities Affairs	4 December 1988–23 March 1989	
8	Waris Khan Afridi	Minister of State for States & Frontier Regions	5 December 1988–6 August 1990	
9	Farooq Azam Malik	Minister of State for Railways	23 March 1989–6 August 1990	
10	Malik Mushtaq Ahmad	Minister of State for Works Division	23 March 1989–6 August 1990	
11	Haji Amanullah	Minister of State for Religious Affairs	23 March 1989–6 August 1990	
12	Mehboob-ur-Rehman Yousuf Zaj	Minister of State for Food, Agriculture & Cooperatives	23 March 1989–6 August 1990	
13	Sher Afgan Niazi	Minister of State for Parliamentary Affairs	23 March 1989–12 June 1990	
14	Mehmooda Shah	Minister of State for Special Education & Social Welfare	23 March 1989–6 August 1990	
15	Nadir Khan Khakwani	Minister of State for Population Welfare Division	23 March 1989–6 August 1990	
16	Mian Muzaffar Shah	Minister of State for Narcotics Control Division	23 March 1989–6 August 1990	
17	Lt. Col. (Retd.) Ch. Qadir Bakhsh Mela	Minister of State for Sports	23 March 1989–6 August 1990	
18	Alhaj Syed Qasim Shah	Minister of State for Environment and Urban Affairs Division; Minister of State for the Tourism Division	23 March 1989–28 January 1990 28 January 1990–6 August 1990	
19	Pervez Ali Shah	Minister of State for Youth	23 March 1989–6 August 1990 30 March 1989–6 August 1990	
20	Shahnaz Wazir Ali	Minister of State for Education	31 March 1989–6 August 1990	
21	Ahmad Saeed Awan	Minister of State for Industries; Minister of State for Information & Broadcasting	31 March 1989–20 September 1989 20 September 1989–6 August 1990	
22	Mir Tariq Hussain Magsi	Minister of State for Labour Manpower & Overseas Pakistanis	31 March 1989–25 October 1989	
23	Shah Nawaz Junejo	Minister of State for Local Govt & Rural Development	31 March 1989–6 August 1990	
24	Rufin Julius	Minister of State for Minorities Affairs	31 March 1989–6 August 1990	
25	Syed Zafar Ali Shah	Minister of State for Water and Power	31 March 1989–6 August 1990	
26	Syed Ahmed Alam Anwar	Minister of State for Manpower & Overseas Pakistanis	11 November 1989–6 August 1990	
27	Ghulam Akbar Lasi	Minister of State for Labour	11 November 1989–6 August 1990	
