= Jatoi caretaker government =

Pakistani Caretaker Government in 1990

Jatoi Caretaker Government
- 30th Cabinet of Pakistan
- 1990
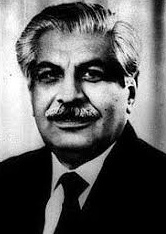
- Caretaker prime minister G. M. Jatoi
- Date formed: 6 August 1990
- Date dissolved: 6 November 1990

People and organisations
- President of Pakistan: Ghulam Ishaq Khan
- Commander of Army Staff: Mirza Aslam Beg
- Caretaker Prime Minister: Ghulam Mustafa Jatoi
- Caretaker Prime Minister's history: Jatoi caretaker ministry (August–November 1990)
- Total no. of members: 19
- Member parties: National Peoples Party
- Status in legislature: Caretaker government

History
- Outgoing election: 1990 general election
- Predecessor: First Benazir government
- Successor: First Sharif government

The Jatoi caretaker government was the first caretaker government in Pakistan from 6 August 1990 to 6 November 1990. Ghulam Mustafa Jatoi acted as the first caretaker Prime Minister of Pakistan. The Jatoi government was appointed by Ghulam Ishaq Khan, who was president, after he dissolved the National Assembly and the PPP Bhutto government in August of the same year. Jatoi previously served as leader of the opposition in the assembly, whilst other caretaker ministers were selected based on their opposition to the PPP. Jatoi himself was a former Pakistan People's Party member who formed his own rival National Peoples Party (NPP) after a dispute with Benazir Bhutto. The caretaker government consisted of anti-PPP ministers in the provinces as-well. Ghulam Haider Wyne, an ally of Nawaz Sharif, was caretaker Chief Minister of Punjab, while in Sindh caretaker Chief Minister Jam Sadiq Ali opposed the PPP. Later Jam Sadiq Ali continued in office as Chief Minister following elections.

The caretaker Prime Minister, G. M. Jatoi, was hoping to become Prime Minister after elections. However, due to the decision of the IJI to run outside the opposition COP front headed by him, he was limited to his personal NPP. Mustafa Jatoi publicly voiced support for the IJI on several occasions and publicly denounced Benazir Bhutto, initiating several corruption cases against the former Prime Minister.

Jatoi and the caretaker government remained in office for three months until they handed over authority to the multi-party Islami Jamhoori Ittehad headed by Nawaz Sharif. Nawaz Sharif became Prime Minister of Pakistan after the general elections in 1990. Due to the partisan bias against the PPP, the electoral results remained controversial, with the PPP claiming that results were rigged in its 1991 White Paper on "How an Election Was Stolen" as well as claims of illegal financial support to members of the IJI.

== History ==
=== Background ===
During Benazir Bhutto's first term as Prime Minister tensions over military appointments, subversion by intelligence agencies, ethnic conflict in Sindh, and conflict between President, Army and Prime Minister over key policy areas culminated in her dismissal by President Ghulam Ishaq Khan under the Eight Amendment and the dissolution of National, Frontier and Sindh assemblies. Previously on 21 July the corps commanders had expressed their dissatisfaction with the Benazir regime to COAS Aslam Beg, who in turn informed President G. I. Khan, leading to the eventual 6 August dismissal on charges of corruption and misconduct. The president called for fresh elections on 24 October the same year, handpicking Ghulam Mustafa Jatoi, who was the leader of the Combined Opposition Parliamentary (COP) Front, which was composed of "almost" all opposition groups in the NA, while personally leading a breakaway faction from the PPP.

=== Caretaker administration ===
Ian Talbot writes in Pakistan: A Modern History that Ghulam Mustafa Jatoi sought to become a permanent Prime Minister, however these plans were dashed by the refusal of both the IJI and MQM to join the Jatoi government. Relations with the IJI declined with the inclusion of Mustafa Khar in the caretaker government and with the MQM when a terrorist attack on 22 August on camps established to welcome Altaf Hussain's return to Pakistan occurred, leading to 30 deaths.

In an interview with the New York Times Jatoi stated that October elections were based on the "single question" if the dismissal of Benazir Bhutto was justified. On television and radio Jatoi called for Pakistani's to vote for the IJI which he said was a democratic coalition while the PPP "lacked leadership and was controlled by a hierarchy of one family which imposed its own will." Saying the IJI believed in "the democratic process." Jatoi also predicted that the IJI would win a "impending crushing victory," that Benazir would soon leave Pakistan, and that his own NPP party would form governments in the centre and provinces, depriving the PPP. Syed Abida Hussain also accused Benazir Bhutto of "strong Zionist links," and claimed that Benazir Bhutto and PPP were "a great danger to the security of Pakistan" because they opposed the President, establishment and judiciary. Benazir Bhutto was active in responding to these claims, using foreign media to cite "the substantial forces arrayed against her" denied corruption charges. G. M. Jatoi declared "an end" to the ban placed on allotment of agriculture land in barrage areas in Sindh, stating they would be distributed to landless Haris.

In a speech, Jatoi promised to "try to stop crimes in the least time in the country especially in Sindh and provide peaceful environment for people." Further stating "[C]riminals involved in kidnapping as well as ransom or blackmailing out of them three or four be hanged openly then others will automatically come on the right track. Once we are selected in the government, we will never hesitate to hang up criminals plainly." On 1 October President Bush suspended economic and military aid to Pakistan under the Pressler Amendment over a Pakistani nuclear program. Leading to the loss of $564 million in aid and the halting of 71 F-16 deliveries to the PAF.

Under the Presidents secretariat in the Aiwan-i-Sadr an 'election cell' was established, "in order to apprise the President with the latest position about elections," under General (retd) Rafaqat.

==== Accountability ====
Ghulam Mustafa Jatoi's caretaker government launched investigations into the corruption of various PPP ministers and Benazir Bhutto. This blurred the non-partisan image of the caretaker government, as its accountability and investigations into corruption were limited to the Bhutto government. Asif Ali Zardari contesting in Lyari was arrested on charges of having connections in the kidnapping of a Pakistani philanthropist in the UK. Benazir Bhutto claimed that the Punjab Caretaker administration had attempted an assassination on her. US envoy Robert Oakley opposed the selective inquiries against the PPP, stating "In my view, if there is to be "accountability" for those holding political office, it should not start from the November 16, 1988 elections which brought in the PPP, but should also include the 1985-1988 period when the IJI parties and politicians ran the government." Shuja Nawaz writes in Crossed Swords "[w]hile a laudable goal in any administration, such actions were seen by external observers as being one sided." Benazir Bhutto under the Liquified Petroleum Gas (Production and Distribution) Rules, was called to the Lahore High Court to explain the distribution of marketing rights of natural gas to friends and family, which hindered her ability to run an election campaign.Cases were also registered against members of the Bhutto family. Bhutto termed the caretaker government "a clique of usurpers, thieves, thugs, robbers and looters," while Jatoi responded saying the nation had been "looted" under the previous administration.

==== Mehrangate ====
Following Benazir Bhutto's removal, COAS Aslam Beg appointed Major Gen. Asad Durrani to replace Shamsur Rahman Kallue as DG-ISI, as Beg sought to support Nawaz Sharif and the IJI in elections. The ISI sourced Rs. 140 million from Habib Bank and Mehran Bank. DG-ISI Durrani later displayed an affidavit showing those who had received money before elections following a case registered by (retd) Air Marshal Asghar Khan against Beg, Durrani and Yunus Habib in 1994. Aslam Beg later testified that he was aware of the distribution of money to anti-PPP and IJI individuals but was not involved. The Presidents election cell also received money from the operation, which Durrani maintained had the support of Ghulam Ishaq Khan and "the whole-hearted participation of the caretaker PM [Jatoi]" and military high command. Later Beg asserted in April 1994 to Nawaz Sharif that the army did not accept donations and claimed that the army did not need the donations of a private banker "when it had resources from the state."

==== Judicial challenges and legal legitimacy ====
===== Lahore High Court verdict =====
President Ishaq Khan's order of dissolution was challenged in the Lahore (LHC) and Sindh High courts (SHC). A full bench of the LHC decided to uphold the order of dissolution of the President under Article 58(2)(b). The court stated that the previous government was not in accord with the provisions of the constitution and that elections were necessary. The courted said the previous administration could not legislate, citing that only 15 ordinances/bills had been passed in twenty months, the federal government was unable to perform its duties under Article 148(3) of the Constitution and prevent "internal disturbances" in Sindh, despite the "repeated advice" of the President, the non-convening of the National Finance Commission provided in Article 160 of the constitution, the Peoples Work Programme (PWP) being contrary to provincial autonomy, that the federal government did not respective the autonomy of federating units, contempt of court, misuse of secret state funds, illegal appointments, breaking the rights of privacy, etc. The Lahore High Court also held that the appointment of the Jatoi caretaker setup was proper under Article 48(2) of the Constitution.

====== Supreme Court appeal ======
The judgement of the LHC was challenged at the Supreme Court of Pakistan (SCP) in the Khawaja Ahmad Tariq Rahim v. the Federation of Pakistan (PLD 1992 S.C. 646). The Supreme Court ruled that the Presidents dissolution order was justified, citing the non-convening of constitutional institutions (CCI and NFC). The SC judgement of Justice Shafiur Rehman upheld the legitimacy of the dissolution through a strict view against parliamentary defections and horse-trading. The judgement did however state that grounds under sections (c), e(ii) and e(iii) were not independently sufficient for dissolution but might be referred to "more relevant" grounds under sections (a) and (b). This was the opinion of the majority. Justice Abdul Shakoor Salam held a dissenting view that only Zia-ul-Haq held the power to dissolve assemblies, and its continuation would weaken the parliamentary system. Justice Sajjad Ali Shah held that if the Peoples Party had failed in governance and in the eyes of the people it would have been defeated un ensuing general elections, therefore holding that the dissolution was not sustainable under the Constitution. However, he held that as elections occurred with the participation of all parties including the PPP and Benazir Bhutto that the National Assembly could not be restored.

===== Sindh High Court verdict =====
Likewise, the Sindh High Court upheld the dissolution of the National Assembly and the Benazir Bhutto government by President Ghulam Ishaq Khan. The court cited the Presidents reasoning in the non-convening of the Council of Common Interests, the NFC, conflict between provincial governments, legislative failure and "scandalous horse trading" referred by the President in a speech, breakdown of law-and-order following the "Pucca Qila Operations," ad-hoc appointments and that the senate "was not shown the respect and importance due to the Upper House," et cetera. The court thus held that the reasoning of the President was sound in the purview of the constitution and further ruled that if "several reasons and grounds given by the President in the order of dissolution are severable and independent" it could be justified on similar grounds.

===== Sindh Assembly verdict =====
When the Chief Minister of Sindh challenged the Governor of Sindh's dissolution order of 6 August, the Sindh High Court dismissed the former CM's petition stating that the Sindh provincial assembly showed "the failure and breakdown" of constitutional provincial government, failed to maintain law-and-order, citing the Pucca Qila 'incident', nonattendance of certain members, various allegations against siting MPAs and "large scale irregular appointments."

===== Peshawar High Court NWFP Assemblies verdict =====
The now former Chief Minister of NWFP, Aftab Ahmad Khan Sherpao challenged before the Peshawar High Court (PHC) the order of dissolution of the provincial assembly, which impugned the order of dissolution of the NWFP assembly and restored the province's cabinet. The PHC held that the President could not independently order dissolution, citing the unanimous passing of the budget to contend the dismissal of the NWFP. The PHC did not hear the Attorney General of Pakistan (AGP) who was defending the dissolution of the National Assembly at other courts, instead calling upon the provinces advocate-general. Leading to the first time a court in Pakistan ordered the restoration of an assembly or cabinet.

====== Supreme Court NWFP Assemblies Verdict ======
Hamid Khan writes that "The President was clearly offended by this judgment and the judges on the Bench had to face dire consequences for rendering such a judgment." The PHC's judgment was later set aside by the Supreme Court claiming that due to large-scale defections the provincial governments democratic mandate had come into "serious doubt" and was not functioning within the provisions of the constitution. Dissenting voices in the SC held by five justices including justices A.S. Salam and Nasim Hasan Shah. Justice Ajmal Mian while agreeing with the dissenting judges and upholding the PHC judgement denied the restoration of the NWFP assembly and cabinet.

==== Jatoi reaction to courts ====
In a speech on 29 September 1990, Ghulam Mustafa Jatoi said "It is the responsibility of my government to conduct free, fair and transparent elections. Honorable Courts are also free to tell constitutional, lawful and transparent decisions."

=== 1990 general elections and the end of the caretaker regime ===
Syeda Abida Hussain, Minister for Information and Broadcasting the caretaker administration used anti-Sindhi sentiments in several speeches to appeal to the politics of 'Punjabiat.' At a public rally at Haq Bahu Colony, Jhang she claimed that Zulfikar and Benazir Bhutto deprived Punjab its share in the Indus river and made Punjabi settlers in Sindh flee from their homes. Stating "Those who turn to the Punjab for votes and work against it forfeit their right to be elected from here." Similarly, MQM leader Altaf Hussain drew support through the use of Mohajir identity.

The Pakistan Peoples Party contested the elections through the Pakistan Democratic Alliance (PDA) consisting of Pakistan Muslim League-(Malik Qasim), TNJF, and Tehreek-e-Istiqlal. Against the PDA was the Islami Jamhoori Ittehad (IJI), mainly consisting of Nawaz Sharif's Muslim League. MQM and JUI(F) contested independent of both. When the IJI did not contest under the Combined Opposition Parliamentary (COP) front, the caretaker Prime Minister Jatoi was reduced to his "insignificant" National Peoples Party.

Anti-American sentiment helped the IJI boost its popularity during the elections. It was claimed that the US government sought to use Benazir Bhutto to weaken the army's influence in Pakistan politics.

In the October 1990 general elections the IJI won 105 seats in the NA, while the second largest alliance the PDA won 45 seats. Several influential politicians including Wali Khan, Maulana Fazlur Rehman, Syeda Abida Hussain, Aftab Ahmad Sherpao, and Mumtaz Bhutto lost their seats, while others such as Muhammad Khan Junejo and Jatoi won. The PDA after the elections termed them as "bogus" as Zia's referendum, while the IJI only came into power "because of votes cast by Angels." The PDA released a White Paper on the 1990 elections called "How An Election Was Stolen." It was alleged that President Ishaq made appointments in the Election Commission with the goal to defeat PDA candidates and further alleged that the provincial caretaker governments through violation of election rules, state media, state civil servants, and various administrative hurdles (gerrymandering, identity card issuances, disrupting election rallies) were complicit. The white paper was refuted by a report of a 40-member international delegation of the Congress-funded National Democratic Institute (NDI) for International Affairs which stated the "election was not without problems" in a polarized atmosphere but stated there was "no evidence of systemic fraud" on a "national scale" and "Notwithstanding serious irregularities in certain constituencies, the IJI would have obtained the largest number of seats in the National Assembly," attributing these to the failure of Benazir Bhutto's previous government and lack of support in Punjab. The International Federation for Human Rights supported the PDA claim that the NDI report was a "white wash."

After the elections, the caretaker Prime Minister Jatoi said "the command is authentication of Allah, which I am going to transfer to the elected candidates by the people," stating "The promise which I made to the people fulfilled, we accomplish the promise with self-assured and remain fixed on our activities." On 7 November the IJI voted Nawaz Sharif "in a crushing victory" as Prime Minister in the National Assembly. Shuja Nawaz writes that "caretaker Prime Minister, Jatoi, having done his duty, was dispensed with in the National Assembly as he vainly tried to become the regular prime minister. Nawaz Sharif had been pre-ordained for that role."

== Government ==
=== Head of State and Head of Government ===
President	Ghulam Ishaq Khan	1988-1993 17 August 1988 – 18 July 1993
Prime Minister	Ghulam Mustafa Jatoi portfolios not allocated to any Minister	1990 6 August 1990 – 6 November 1990

=== Federal caretaker composition ===
Jatoi Caretaker Cabinet
Serial number	Cabinet Ministers	Cabinet Ministries	Tenure	Ref.
1	Illahi Bakhsh Soomro	Commerce	7 August–6 November	
2	Sartaj Aziz	Finance, Economic Affairs, Planning	7 August–6 November	
3	Ghulam Mustafa Khar	Water and Power	7 August–6 November	
4	Rafi Raza	Production	7 August–6 November	
5	Sahabzada Yaqub Khan	Foreign Affairs	7 August–6 November	
6	Chaudhry Shujaat Hussain	Industries	7 August–6 November	
7	Malik Muhammad Naeem Khan	Communications	13 August–6 November	
8	Abdul Majid Malik	Petroleum and Natural Resources	13 August–6 November	
8	Abdul Majid Malik	Petroleum and Natural Resources	7 October–6 November	
8	Abdul Majid Malik	States and Frontier and Kashmir Affairs	7 October–6 November	
9	Mian Zahid Sarfraz	Interior and Narcotics Control	7 August–6 November	
10	Hazar Khan Bijarani	Science and Technology	13 August–6 November	
10	Hazar Khan Bijarani	Religious Affairs & MA	7 August–6 November	
11	Syeda Abida Hussain	Information and Broadcasting	13 August–6 November	
12	Roedad Khan	Minister without portfolio	13 August–6 November	
13	Pir Aftab Hussain Shah	Food, Agriculture and Cooperatives	28 August–6 November	
14	Noor Jahan Panezai	Health, Special Education & SW	28 August–6 November	
14	Noor Jahan Panezai	Women Development	7 August–6 November	
15	Qazi Abdul Majeed Abid	Education	28 August–6 November	
16	Naseer Mengal	Labour, Manpower and Overseas Pakistanis	28 August–6 November	
17	Makhdoom Shafiq uz Zaman	Culture and Tourism	28 August–6 November	
18	Chaudhry Amir Hussain	Law, Justice and PA	28 August–6 November	
19	Islam Nabi	Housings and Works	28 August–6 November	

== See also ==
- Caretaker government of Pakistan
- Caretaker Prime Minister of Pakistan
- Ghulam Mustafa Jatoi
- 1990 Pakistani general election
- National Peoples Party (Pakistan)
- 1990 in Pakistan
