= Abdul Sattar Rajper =

Pakistani politician

- عبدالستار راڄپر

Member of the Provincial Assembly of Sindh
- In office 2008 – 28 May 2018
- Constituency: PS-22 (Naushero Feroze-IV)

Personal details
- Born: 1 January 1960 (age 66) Naushahro Feroze District
- Party: Pakistan Peoples Party

Abdul Sattar Rajper (Sindhi:عبدالستار راڄپر) is a Pakistani politician who was a Member of the Provincial Assembly of Sindh from 2008 to May 2018.

== Early life and education ==
He was born on 1 January 1960 in Naushahro Feroze District.

He has a MBBS degree from Liaquat Medical College in Jamshoro.

== Political career ==
He was elected to the Provincial Assembly of Sindh as a candidate of Pakistan Peoples Party (PPP) from Constituency PS-22 (Naushero Feroze-IV) in the 2008 Pakistani general election. He received 34,793 votes and defeated Abdul Sattar Abbasi, a candidate of National Peoples Party (NPP).

He was re-elected to the Provincial Assembly of Sindh as a candidate of PPP from Constituency PS-22 Naushahro Feroze-IV in the 2013 Pakistani general election. He received 30,124 votes and defeated Arif Mustafa Jatoi, a candidate of NPP.
