= NA-206 Naushahro Feroze-II =

Constituency of the National Assembly of Pakistan

- Constituency for the National Assembly of Pakistan
- Region: Moro Tehsil, Naushahro Feroze Tehsil, Bhiria Tehsil (partly) and Kandiaro Tehsil (partly) including Kandiaro town of Naushahro Feroze District
- Electorate: 465,846

Current constituency
- Party: Pakistan People's Party
- Member: Zulfiqar Ali Behan
- Created from: NA-211 Naushahro Feroze-I

NA-206 Naushahro Feroze-II (این اے-206، نوشہروفِيروز-2) is a constituency for the National Assembly of Pakistan.

== Assembly Segments ==
Constituency number	Constituency	District	Current MPA	Party
34	PS-34 Naushahro Feroze-III	Naushahro Feroze District	Mumtaz Ali Chandio	PPP
35	PS-35 Naushahro Feroze-IV	Naushahro Feroze District	Zia Ul Hassan Lanjar	PPP

== Election 2002 ==
General elections were held on 10 October 2002. Abdul Ghaffar Khan Jatoi of National Alliance won by 83,043 votes.

General election 2002: NA-211 Naushahro Feroze-I
Party	Candidate	Votes	%	±%
NA	Dr. Abdul Ghaffar Khan Jatoi	83,403	64.54	
PPP	Zulfiqar Ali Behan	43,220	33.44	
Others	Others (seven candidates)	2,609	2.02	
Turnout		131,842	39.98	
Total valid votes		129,232	98.02	
Rejected ballots		2,610	1.98	
Majority		40,183	31.10	
Registered electors		329,798		

== Election 2008 ==
General elections were held on 18 February 2008. Ghulam Murtaza Khan Jatoi of National Peoples Party won by 109,319 votes.

General election 2008: NA-211 Naushahro Feroze-I
Party	Candidate	Votes	%	±%
NPP	Ghulam Murtaza Khan Jatoi	109,319	66.43	
PPP	Zulfiqar Ali Behan	54,268	32.98	
Others	Others (eight candidates)	985	0.59	
Turnout		167,884	44.06	
Total valid votes		164,572	98.03	
Rejected ballots		3,312	1.97	
Majority		55,051	33.45	
Registered electors		381,020		
NPP gain from NA				

== Election 2013 ==
General elections were held on 11 May 2013. Ghulam Murtaza Khan Jatoi of National Peoples Party won by 83,960 votes and became the member of National Assembly.

General election 2013: NA-211 Naushahro Feroze-I
Party	Candidate	Votes	%	±%
NPP	Ghulam Murtaza Khan Jatoi	83,960	51.60	
PPP	Zulfiqar Ali Behan	67,338	41.38	
Others	Others (sixteen candidates)	11,424	7.02	
Turnout		170,335	59.17	
Total valid votes		162,722	95.53	
Rejected ballots		7,613	4.47	
Majority		16,622	10.22	
Registered electors		287,886		
NPP hold				

== Election 2018 ==
General elections were held on 25 July 2018.

General election 2018: NA-212 Naushahro Feroze-II
Party	Candidate	Votes	%	±%
PPP	Zulfiqar Ali Behan	90,663	46.52	
GDA	Ghulam Murtaza Jatoi	84,516	43.37	
Independent	Abdul Haq Dost Muhammad	7,855	4.03	
PTI	Syed Kazim All Shah	3,641	1.87	
MMA	Abdul Rehman	3,345	1.72	
Independent	Gul Muhammad Channa	1,343	0.69	
Independent	Aziz Ahmed Behan	934	0.48	
Independent	Mumtaz Ali	612	0.31	
Independent	Mumtaz All Chandio	576	0.30	
Independent	Razi Ali Khan Jatoi	399	0.20	
Independent	Khalid Akhtar Jatoi	388	0.20	
Independent	Haji Khan Mashori	278	0.14	
Independent	Arif Mustafa Jatoi	203	0.10	
Independent	Imdad Ali	120	0.06	
Turnout		202,570	54.82	
Total valid votes		194,873	96.20	
Rejected ballots		7,697	3.80	
Majority		6,147	3.15	
Registered electors		369,531		
PPP gain from NPP				

== Election 2024 ==
Elections were held on 8 February 2024. Zulfiqar Ali Behan won the election with 135,864 votes.

General election 2024: NA-206 Naushahro Feroze-II
Party	Candidate	Votes	%	±%
PPP	Zulfiqar Ali Behan	135,864	60.90	▲14.38
GDA	Ghulam Murtaza Jatoi	77,202	34.60	▼8.77
Others	Others (thirteen candidates)	10,042	4.50	
Turnout		231,746	49.75	▼5.07
Total valid votes		223,108	96.27	
Rejected ballots		8,638	3.73	
Majority		58,662	26.29	▲23.14
Registered electors		465,846		
PPP hold				

== See also ==
- NA-205 Naushahro Feroze-I
- NA-207 Nawabshah-I
