= Zulfiqar Ali Behan =

Pakistani politician

- ذوالفقار علي بھڻ

Member of the National Assembly of Pakistan
- Incumbent
- Assumed office 29 February 2024
- Constituency: NA-206 Naushahro Feroze-II
- In office 13 August 2018 – 10 August 2023
- Constituency: NA-212 (Naushahro Feroze-II)
- In office August 2013 – January 2016
- Constituency: NA-211 (Naushero Feroze-I)

Personal details
- Party: PPP (2013-present)

Zulfiqar Ali Behan (Sindhi: ذوالفقار علي ٻھڻ) is a Pakistani politician who has been a member of the National Assembly of Pakistan since February 2024 and previously served in this position from August 2018 till August 2023 and from August 2014 to January to 2016.

== Political career ==
He ran for the seat of the National Assembly of Pakistan as a candidate of Pakistan Peoples Party (PPP) from NA-211 (Naushero Feroze-I) in the 2013 Pakistani general election but was unsuccessful. He challenged the successful election of Ghulam Murtaza Jatoi, a candidate of National Peoples Party (NPP) In August 2014, an election tribunal declared election of Ghulam Murtaza Jatoi void and declared Behan as candidate returned to the National Assembly from Constituency NA-211 (Naushero Feroze-I). In January 2016, the Supreme Court of Pakistan annulled the verdict of the Election Tribunal and restored the National Assembly membership of Ghulam Murtaza Jatoi.

He was re-elected to the National Assembly as a candidate of PPP from NA-212 (Naushahro Feroze-II) in the 2018 Pakistani general election. He received 90,663 votes and defeated Ghulam Murtaza Jatoi, a candidate of the Grand Democratic Alliance (GDA).

He was re-elected to the National Assembly as a candidate of PPP from NA-206 Naushahro Feroze-II in the 2024 Pakistani general election. He received 135,864 votes and defeated Ghulam Murtaza Jatoi, a candidate of the GDA.
