= Shafi ur Rahman Commission Report =

The Shafi ur Rahman Commission Report are the highly classified judicial inquiry papers concerning and thoroughly covering the events leading to the rise to power and death and state funeral of President of Pakistan, General Zia-ul-Haq.

The Commission led by Senior Justice Shafi ur Rahman investigated and authored the inquiry papers at the behest of Prime Minister Nawaz Sharif in 1992. Senior Justice Rehman submitted his commission report to Prime Minister's Secretariat, also the same year. The submitted report was critical of the role played by the military, primary due to obstructing its work while conducting the interviews.

Immediately its submission, the papers were quickly classified by the Prime Minister, and very few details are available to public either through investigative media reports. No such details of the papers are known to the public, and considerately marked as Top Secret by the Government of Pakistan. In 2011, the government declassified only few and earliest portion of the report and made it publicly accessible, but large parts of the papers are keep as secret.
