= Suhrawardy government =

Pakistani Government from 1956 to 1957

Central Government of Huseyn Shaheed Suhrawardy
- 6th Cabinet of Pakistan
- 1956-1957
- Prime Minister Suhrawardy on the leftmost, alongside his President, Iskander Mirza at the rightmost, in a government office.
- Date formed: 12 September 1956
- Date dissolved: 17 October 1957

People and organisations
- Head of state: Iskander Mirza
- Head of government: Huseyn Shaheed Suhrawardy
- Member party: AL; Coalition members: RP
- Opposition party: PML; UF
- Opposition leader: I.I. Chundrigar

History
- Election: 1955 Pakistani Constituent Assembly election
- Outgoing election: 1947 Pakistani Constituent Assembly election
- Legislature terms: 2nd Constituent Assembly of Pakistan
- Predecessor: Chaudhri Muhammad Ali government
- Successor: Chundrigar government

The Suhrawardy government also called the Suhrawardy administration was the sixth government and cabinet of Pakistan which was formed by Huseyn Shaheed Suhrawardy on 12 September 1956 after the resignation of Chaudhry Muhammad Ali.

The government was dominated by Bengali politicians from East Pakistan and members of the ruling All-Pakistan Awami League. The Awami League joined a coalition with the Republican Party to form the government. Growing animosity between West and East Pakistan as well as between Suhrawardy’s coalition partners and his own party members led to Suhrawardy’s resignation and succession by the Chundrigar government in October 1957.

== History ==
=== Policies ===
On 12 September 1956, the government led by HS Suhrawardy was established. A significant conflict emerged between this administration and major business interests over maritime commerce between East and West Pakistan. The Ministry of Commerce and Industry proposed the creation of a public Shipping Corporation to manage coastal trade, which was controlled by a few shipping tycoons. This proposal aimed to address problems such as the black-market sales of shipping space by the Shipping Space Allocation Board and the significant foreign currency costs incurred by chartering foreign vessels due to the insufficient capacity of private ships to handle the entire coastal trade.

The Economic Appraisal Committee of the Central Government and the First Five Year Plan drafters had both recommended the establishment of a Shipping Corporation. However, when the proposal was advanced, it faced strong opposition from the Pakistan Ship-owners' Association and the Federation of Chambers of Commerce and Industries, supported by industrialist Yusuf Haroon, a member of the National Assembly. In contrast, traders and industrialists from East Pakistan generally supported the initiative.

The opposition escalated as the Pakistan Ship-owners' Association conducted a campaign against the proposed National Shipping Corporation, labeling it as monopolistic through advertisements in major national newspapers. These ads questioned the move's implications for a free society. The sustained opposition contributed to Suhrawardy's resignation, as influential business groups and Republican landlords persuaded President Iskander Mirza to demand and accept his departure from office.

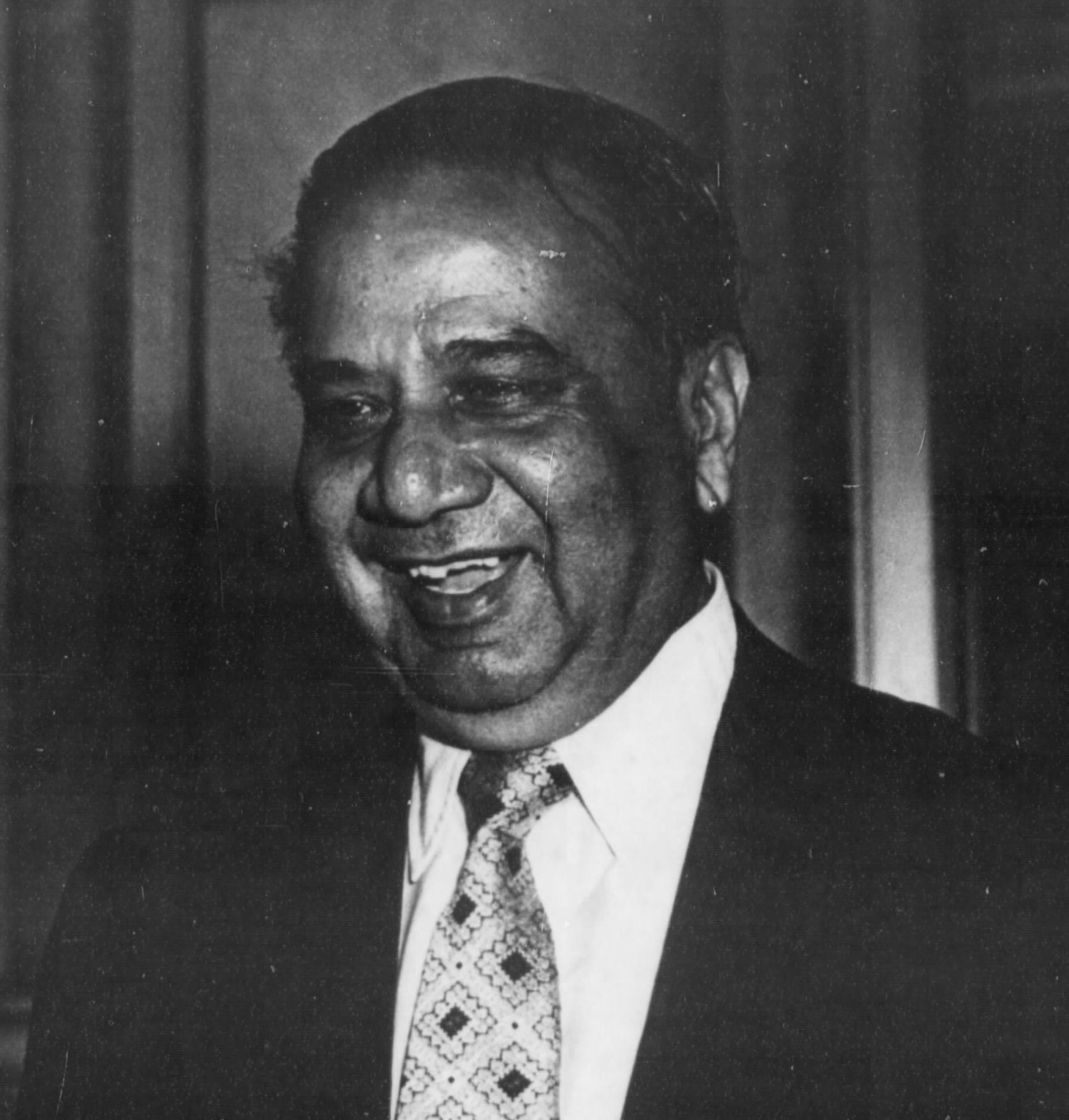
Huseyn Shaheed Suhrawardy as prime minister, 1957.

=== Issues and collapse ===
The government was originally founded when the President, Iskander Mirza who himself was from the Republican Party, invited the Awami League to form the central government that appointed Huseyn Suhrawardy as the Prime Minister. Despite Mirza and Suhrawardy both being Bengalis and hailing from West Bengal, the two leaders had very different views of running the central government and both leaders were in brief conflict, causing harm to the unity of the nation. Prime Minister Suhrawardy found it extremely difficult to govern effectively due to the issue of One Unit, alleviating the national economy, and President Mirza's constant unconstitutional interference in the Suhrawardy’s administration.

President Mirza demanded the resignation of Prime Minister Suhrawardy and turned down his request to seek a motion of confidence in the National Assembly. Threatened by President Mirza's dismissal, Prime Minister Suhrawardy tendered his resignation on 17 October 1957 and was succeeded by I. I. Chundrigar but he too was forced to resign in a mere two months.

== Cabinet ==
=== Federal ministers ===
Minister	Portfolio	Period	Party
H. S. Suhrawardy	1. Defence; 2. Kashmir Affairs; 3. States & Frontier Regions; 4. Economic Affairs; 5. Law; 6. Refugees & Rehabilitation; 7. Education; 8. Health	12 September 1956 to 18 October 1957; 12 September 1956 to 13 December 1956; 12 September 1956 to 18 October 1957; 12 September 1956 to 17 September 1956; 12 September 1956 to 18 October 1957; 12 September 1956 to 18 October 1957; 12 September 1956 to 18 October 1957; 12 September 1956 to 18 October 1957	Awami League
Feroz Khan Noon	Foreign Affairs & Commonwealth Relations	12 September 1956 to 18 October 1957	Republican
Abul Mansur Ahmad	1. Commerce; 2. Industries	12 September 1956 to 18 October 1957	Awami League
Syed Amjad Ali	Finance	12 September 1956 to 18 October 1957	
Muhammad Abdul Khaleque	1. Labour; 2. Works	12 September 1956 to 18 October 1957	
Ghulam Ali Talpur	Interior	12 September 1956 to 18 October 1957	
A. H. Dildar Ahmad	1. Food; 2. Agriculture	12 September 1956 to 18 October 1957	
Amir Azam Khan	1. Information & Broadcasting; 2. Parliamentary Affairs; 3. Law	12 September 1956 to 5 September 1957; 12 September 1956 to 5 September 1957; 13 December 1956 to 5 September 1957	
Syed Misbahuddin Hussain	Communications	18 October 1957 to 16 December 1957	
Mian Jaffer Shah	1. States & Frontier Regions; 2. Information & Broadcasting	18 October 1957 to 16 December 1957	
Abdul Aleem	1. Rehabilitation; 2. Works	18 October 1957 to 24 October 1957; 24 October 1957 to 16 December 1957	
Yusuf Haroon	1. Kashmir Affairs; 2. Parliamentary Affairs	18 October 1957 to 16 December 1957	
Lutfur Rahman Khan	1. Health; 2. Education	18 October 1957 to 16 December 1957	
Farid Ahmad	Labour	23 October 1957 to 16 December 1957	

=== Ministers of State ===
Minister	Portfolio	Period
Haji Moulabuksh Soomro	Rehabilitation	24 October 1957 to 16 December 1957
Akshay Kumar Das	Commerce	5 November 1957 to 16 December 1957
