= Chundrigar government =

Cabinet of Pakistan for 54 days in 1957

Central Government of Ibrahim Ismail Chundrigar
- 7th Cabinet of Pakistan
- 1957
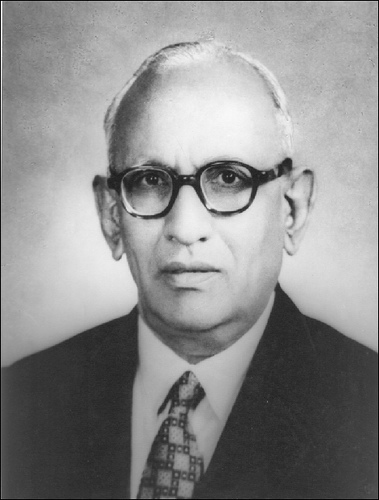
- Date formed: 18 October 1957
- Date dissolved: 11 December 1957

People and organisations
- Head of state: Iskander Mirza
- Head of government: Ibrahim Ismail Chundrigar
- Member party: Muslim League; Coalition members: United Front; Republican Party
- Opposition party: All-Pakistan Awami League
- Opposition leader: Huseyn Shaheed Suhrawardy

History
- Election: 1955 Pakistani Constituent Assembly election
- Outgoing election: 1947 Pakistani Constituent Assembly election
- Legislature terms: 2nd Constituent Assembly of Pakistan
- Predecessor: Suhrawardy government
- Successor: Noon government

The Chundrigar government also known as the Chundrigar administration was the seventh government and cabinet of Pakistan formed by Ibrahim Ismail Chundrigar on 18 October 1957 after the resignation of the previous prime minister, Huseyn Shaheed Suhrawardy.

The government was an extremely fragile coalition between Chundrigar's own party, the Muslim League and the Krishak Sramik Party, the Nizam-e-Islam Party and the Republican Party. Such a large coalition meant that Chundrigar's power was curtailed severely which was a leading cause to his short tenure.

It ruled until 11 December 1957, after only a mere 54 days due to pressure by Chundrigar's coalition partners, which led to a motion of no confidence in Pakistan's constituent assembly against Chundrigar. In response to the motion, Chundrigar resigned, ending the government.

== History ==
The Chundrigar government, which held office from October 18 to December 11, 1957, quickly acquiesced to business interests despite its brief tenure. The administration revoked import licenses issued by the previous government under the $10 million ICA aid program and abandoned plans to establish a state-owned Shipping Corporation. The new Commerce Minister met with a delegation from the Federation of Chambers of Commerce and Industries, led by its president, M.A. Rangoonwala, and assured them that the government would separate economic policy from political influence.

The government faced opposition from the Awami League, though its dissolution would come when Chundrigar's own three coalition partners lost favor with the government. Internal pressure led to a motion of no confidence which consequently resulted in Chundrigar's resignation, making it one of the shortest government's in Pakistan's political history.

== Cabinet ==
=== Federal ministers ===
Minister	Portfolio	Period
I. I. Chundrigar	1. Economic Affairs; 2. Labour; 3. Works; 4. Rehabilitation	18 October 1957 to 16 December 1957; 18 October 1957 to 23 October 1957; 18 October 1957 to 24 October 1957; 24 October 1957 to 16 December 1957
Feroz Khan Noon	Foreign Affairs & Commonwealth Relations	19 October 1957 to 16 December 1957
Fazlur Rahman	1. Commerce; 2. Law	18 October 1957 to 16 December 1957
Syed Amjad Ali	Finance	18 October 1957 to 16 December 1957
Mumtaz Daultana	Defence	18 October 1957 to 16 December 1957
Muzaffar Ali Khan Qizilbash	Industries	18 October 1957 to 16 December 1957
Abdul Latif Biswas	1. Food; 2. Agriculture	18 October 1957 to 16 December 1957
Ghulam Ali Talpur	Interior	18 October 1957 to 16 December 1957
Mian Jaffer Shah	Communications	12 September 1956 to 18 October 1957
Sheikh Zahiruddin	1. Education; 2. Health; 3. Minority Affairs	17 September 1956 to 18 October 1957; 13 December 1956 to 18 October 1957

=== Ministers of State ===
Minister	Portfolio	Period
Rasaraj Mandal	Economic Affairs	29 September 1956 to 18 October 1957
Haji Maula Bakhsh Soomro	Rehabilitation	9 March 1957 to 18 October 1957
Abdul Aleem	Finance	9 March 1957 to 18 October 1957
Nurur Rahman	Commerce	13 March 1957 to 18 October 1957
