= Ghulam Murtaza Jatoi =

Pakistani politician

Ghulam Murtaza Khan Jatoi

Minister for Industries and Production
- In office 4 August 2017 – 31 May 2018
- President: Mamnoon Hussain
- Prime Minister: Shahid Khaqan Abbasi
- Succeeded by: Shamshad Akhtar
- In office 7 June 2013 – 28 July 2017
- President: Mamnoon Hussain
- Prime Minister: Nawaz Sharif
- Preceded by: Ayatollah Durrani

Sindh Provincial Minister for Irrigation
- In office 1997–2002

Minister for Overseas Pakistanis
- In office 1993–1994

Minister for Communications
- In office 10 November 1990 – 11 March 1992

Personal details
- Born: 4 September 1958 (age 68) Naushero Feroze, Pakistan
- Party: GDA (2018-present)
- Other political affiliations: PMLN (2013-18); NPP (1988-2013)
- Relations: Liaquat Ali Jatoi (cousin)
- Parent: Ghulam Mustafa Jatoi (father)
- Education: Sindh University (BA and MA)

Ghulam Murtaza Khan Jatoi (Urdu: غلام مرتضیٰ خان جتوئی; born 4 September 1958) is a Pakistani politician who served as Minister for Industries and Production, in Abbasi cabinet from August 2017 to May 2018. A former leader of the Pakistan Muslim League (Nawaz), Jatoi served as the Minister for Industries and Production in the third Sharif ministry. and previously held the cabinet portfolios of Minister for Communications during the first Sharif's ministry from 1990 to 1992, and as Minister for Overseas Pakistanis during the Second Bhutto ministry from 1993 to 1994.

Jatoi had been a member of the National Assembly of Pakistan representing Naushahro Feroze and served as Sindh Provincial Minister for Irrigation from 1997 to 2002 during the Sharif's second ministry. Ghulam Murtaza Khan Jatoi is the present Nawab of the Jatoi tribe and the Chief of zangejo Jatoi in Kosh kros and trat also come the Newjatoi jatoi family has always been the Nawabi Family of the Jatoi tribe it has gotten 3 generations of Khan Bahdur titles.

== Early life and education ==
Jatoi was born on 4 September 1958 to Ghulam Mustafa Jatoi who is a former caretaker prime minister of Pakistan. Jatoi got his early education from Grand Folks School and St. Patrick's College. He did his Graduation and Masters from Sindh University.

== Political career ==
Jatoi started his political career after getting elected as Chairman District Council, Nawab Shah in 1979. He was elected as a member of Provincial Assembly of Sindh for the first time in the 1988 Pakistani general election and was appointed as provincial minister for Government of Sindh where he served from 1988 to 1990.

He was elected as member of National Assembly of Pakistan for the first time in the 1990 Pakistani general election and was appointed as the Minister for Communications where he served from 1990 to 1992.

He was re-elected as the member of the National Assembly for the second time in the 1993 Pakistani general election and was appointed as Minister for Overseas Pakistanis for a brief period. He was re-elected as member of Sindh Assembly in 1997 Pakistani general election and appointed as provincial minister for Irrigation. He also held the office of Advisor to Chief Minister of Sindh on Agriculture from 2004 to 2007. He was re-elected as member of National Assembly for the third time in 2008 Pakistani general election.

In May 2013, his party National Peoples Party of which he was the President merged with PML-N.

He was re-elected as the member of National Assembly in the 2013 Pakistani general election and was appointed as the Minister for Industries & Production in Sharif's third ministry.

He had ceased to hold ministerial office in July 2017 when the federal cabinet was disbanded following the resignation of Prime Minister Nawaz Sharif after Panama Papers case decision. Following the election of Shahid Khaqan Abbasi as Prime Minister of Pakistan in August 2017, he was inducted into the federal cabinet of Abbasi. He was appointed as federal minister for Industry and Production. Upon the dissolution of the National Assembly on the expiration of its term on 31 May 2018, Jatoi ceased to hold the office as Federal Minister for Industries and Production.

Before the 2018 General election, he merged National Peoples Party with Grand Democratic Alliance (GDA) emerged before general elections, and he contested as member of national assembly from NA-212 constituency on GDA seat but lost after winning the constituency by Zulfiqar Ali Behan of Pakistan Peoples Party.

Political offices
Preceded by	Minister for Communications; 1990–1992	Succeeded by
Preceded by	Minister for Overseas Pakistanis; 1993-1994	Succeeded by
Preceded by	Sindh Provincial Minister for Irrigation; 1997-2002	Succeeded by
Preceded by	Minister for Industry and Production; 2013-2017	Incumbent
