= Caretaker government of Pakistan =

Interim government of Pakistan

The Caretaker Government of Pakistan is an interim government established in the period between the dissolution of the National Assembly or of a provincial assembly and the establishment of a fresh government in Pakistan. This setup is being led by the Caretaker Prime Minister of Pakistan or caretaker chief minister. The purpose of the caretaker government is to ensure free and fair elections.

== History ==
The concept of a caretaker government was introduced in Pakistan in 1985 by Muhammad Zia-ul-Haq. When he fired Muhammad Junejo in 1988, he reappointed the same cabinet but without Junejo's loyalists. Despite the fact the Constitution does not impose to appoint a prime minister to lead the caretaker setup, Supreme Court ruled in 1990 that Junejo's removal and further National Assembly dissolution, as illegal, but does not restaure them because new elections have been held. On 6 August 1990, Ghulam Mustafa Jatoi became the inaugural Caretaker Prime Minister of Pakistan. Since then, there have been several caretaker prime ministers, with the most recent being Anwarul Haq Kakar, a Baluchistan Awami Party senator who took office on 12 August 2023, after the National Assembly dissolved.

== Powers and Role ==
The main objective of the interim government, in accordance with the 1973 Constitution and the Elections Act of 2017, is to guarantee elections that are characterized by openness, equity, and clarity. The interim government holds the duty of overseeing an electoral procedure that is just and unbiased. This encompasses the enforcement of steps to hinder any fraudulent activities related to voting and verifying the precision of the voter registries.

In 2023, a suggested law gave the caretaker government extensive authority. Parties working together were against this, so the issue was postponed. After more talk, they decided to adjust the law slightly. This way, the interim government can only work with two types of donors: ones from individual countries and groups of countries. The modified version lets the interim government use its authority for ongoing plans, but not for making new deals. This change involves adding a new rule called clause 2A to Section 230.

== Term ==
The term length of a caretaker government is up to 3 months. Following the dissolution of the National Assembly or of the Provincial Assembly, whether it is dissolved by the completion of its term or by an early dissolution, the President or the Governor shall appoint a Caretaker government. However, this must be done with the consultation of the Prime Minister or Chief Minister and the Leader of the Opposition, who should reach a consensus on whom to choose as Caretaker PM. In the event that such a consensus is not attained, the President holds the liberty to appoint an Interim Prime Minister according to his preference; however, this step typically involves consultation with the Election Commission of Pakistan.

== Cabinet ==
The official in the caretaker cabinet has the same abilities and duties as the elected Prime Minister, Chief Minister, and Ministers they took the place of. The interim Prime Minister and Provincial Chief Ministers possess complete power to select individuals of their preference for crucial roles within the bureaucracy. The sole legal limitation imposed on the interim government is that the caretaker Prime Minister, Chief Ministers, Ministers, along with their spouses and offspring, are ineligible to participate in elections held during the interim period.

== Constitutional Relevance ==
A Caretaker Government is not a constitutional requirement anywhere else in the world except in Pakistan. It has caused turbulence in the political system because it can be used as a tool to manipulate the election process. The Caretaker Government is not mentioned in the 1956, 1962, and 1973 constitution of Pakistan. The concept of caretaker government was added to the 1973 Constitution by Gen Muhammad Zia-ul-Haq in 1985, known as the Revival of Constitution of 1973 Order, 1985 (RCO).
