= Caretaker Prime Minister of Pakistan =

Acting head after dissolution of the National Assembly

Caretaker Prime Minister of the Islamic Republic of Pakistan نگران وزیر اعظم پاکستان
- Standard of the Prime Minister of Pakistan
- Style: His Excellency (diplomatic); Mr. Prime Minister (informal); Honourable Prime Minister (formal)
- Member of: Cabinet Common Interests Council National Security Committee National Command Authority
- Residence: Prime Minister's Office
- Appointer: De jure: President of Pakistan De facto: Consensus between Prime Minister and Leader of the Opposition; If consensus is not reached, then the ECP shall appoint one
- Term length: Up to 3 months
- Formation: 6 August 1990; 36 years ago
- First holder: Ghulam Mustafa Jatoi (1990)
- Final holder: Anwaar ul Haq Kakar (2023–2024)
- Website: www.pmo.gov.pk/

The caretaker prime minister of Pakistan (Urdu: نگران وزیر اعظم پاکستان) is the acting head of the Caretaker Government in Pakistan following the dissolution of the National Assembly. The purpose of this post is to ensure free and fair elections are held. The most recent caretaker prime minister was Anwaar ul Haq Kakar, who took office on 14 August 2023, after the National Assembly was dissolved; he served until 4 March 2024.

== Federal law and constitution ==
Following the dissolution of the National Assembly, whether it is dissolved by the completion of its term or by an early dissolution, the President shall appoint a Caretaker government. However, this must be done with the consultation of the Prime Minister and the Leader of the Opposition, who should reach a consensus on whom to choose as Caretaker PM. If this consensus is not reached, the President is free to choose a Caretaker Prime Minister of his choice, although this is usually done in consultation with the Election Commission of Pakistan.

== List of caretaker prime ministers of Pakistan ==
List of prime ministers of Pakistan
No.	Portrait	Name (Birth–death)	Took office	Left office	Tenure	Political party (Alliance)	Note(s)
1st Caretaker		Ghulam Mustafa Jatoi ٖغلام مصطفی جتوئی (1931–2009)	6 August 1990	6 November 1990	3 months	National Peoples Party	Jatoi was appointed by President Ghulam Ishaq Khan as a caretaker Prime Minister. Led the first caretaker government in Pakistani history.
2nd Caretaker		Balakh Sher Mazari میر بلخ شیر مزاری (1928–2022)	18 April 1993	26 May 1993	1 month and 8 days	Pakistan People's Party	Appointed by President Khan as a caretaker Prime Minister, Mazari's term ended when the Supreme Court overturned the Presidential order and restored Nawaz Sharif's government.
3rd Caretaker		Moeenuddin Ahmad Qureshi معین الدین احمد قریشی (1930–2016)	18 July 1993	19 October 1993	3 months and 1 day	Independent	After Sharif's resignation in July 1993, Qureshi was appointed as the caretaker Prime Minister.
4th Caretaker		Malik Meraj Khalid ملک معراج خالد (1916–2003)	5 November 1996	17 February 1997	3 months and 12 days	Independent	Khalid was appointed as a caretaker Prime Minister after the dismissal of Benazir Bhutto's government in November 1996.
5th Caretaker	A head and shoulder shot of a bearded man wearing spectacles	Muhammad Mian Soomro محمد میاں سومرو (1950–)	15 November 2007	25 March 2008	4 months and 10 days	Pakistan Muslim League (Q)	Soomro took the office as caretaker Prime Minister in November 2007.
6th Caretaker		Mir Hazar Khan Khoso میر ہزار خان کھوسو (1929–2021)	24 March 2013	5 June 2013	2 months and 12 days	Independent	Khoso was appointed by the Election Commission of Pakistan on 24 March, and took the oath of office on 25 March 2013.
7th Caretaker		Nasirul Mulk جسٹس(ر) ناصر الملک (1950–)	31 May 2018	18 August 2018	2 months and 18 days	Independent	Nasirul Mulk was appointed by a consensus between Prime Minister Shahid Khaqan Abbasi and opposition leader Syed Khurshid Ahmed Shah on 28 May. He took the oath of office on 1 June 2018.
8th Caretaker		Anwaar ul Haq Kakar انوار الحق کاکڑ (1971–)	14 August 2023	4 March 2024	6 months and 19 days	Balochistan Awami Party	Anwaar ul Haq Kakar was appointed after opposition leader Raja Riaz Ahmad Khan and Prime Minister Shehbaz Sharif agreed on his name, and President Arif Alvi signed on the summary.

== See also ==
- Acting President of Pakistan
