= Ghulam Sarwar Cheema =

Pakistani politician

Minister of State for Defence
- In office 1988–1990
- Prime Minister: Benazir Bhutto

Member of the National Assembly of Pakistan
- In office 1997–1999
- Constituency: NA-74 (Gujranwala-I)

Member of the National Assembly of Pakistan
- In office 1988–1990
- Constituency: NA-74 (Gujranwala-I)

Ghulam Sarwar Cheema was a Pakistani politician and military officer. He served as minister of state for defence in the first government of Benazir Bhutto and was elected twice to the National Assembly of Pakistan from NA-74 (Gujranwala-I), first in 1988 and again in 1997. Before joining politics, he retired as colonel from Pakistan Army.

== Political career ==
In the 1988 Pakistani general election, Cheema was elected to the National Assembly from NA-74 (Gujranwala-I) as a candidate of the Pakistan People's Party. Later reporting noted that he had defeated Hamid Nasir Chattha in that contest.

During Benazir Bhutto's first government, he served as minister of state for defence.

In the 1997 Pakistani general election, Cheema was again elected to the National Assembly from NA-74 (Gujranwala-I), this time as a candidate of the Pakistan Muslim League (N).

In the early 2000s, Cheema became active as a member of the Pakistan Muslim League (Q). In 2011, he joined the Pakistan Tehreek-e-Insaf.

== Personal life ==
Cheema came from a political family in the Wazirabad area. His father, Major Ghulam Haider Cheema, had earlier represented the same constituency in the National Assembly. He was the father of Adnan Sarwar Cheema, who later contested elections from the same area.

Cheema died before the 2013 Pakistani general election.
