= Muhammad Abdul Khaleque =

Pakistani politician

Muhammad Abdul Khaleque (1911–1965) was a Pakistani lawyer, politician and member of All-Pakistan Awami League (AL) who served as a member of the National Assembly of Pakistan representing East Bengal and federal minister of the Suhrawardy government.

== Biography ==
Khaleque was born in 1911. He became a lawyer and started political career by joining Indian National Congress (INC). In 1946, he changed his party to All-India Muslim League (AIML). After the independence of Pakistan, he left AIML and became a member of All-Pakistan Awami League (AL) from Jessore and became president of its Jessore branch. In the 1954 East Bengal Legislative Assembly election, he contested and elected. He later contested in the 1955 Pakistani Constituent Assembly election from East Pakistan and elected as a member of the Constituent Assembly of Pakistan.

He was the Federal Minister of Labour and Works from 12 September 1956 to 18 October 1957 during the Suhrawardy government. In 1958, he became East Pakistan's provincial minister for Agriculture, Works and Irrigation Department. On 11 May 1965, he was expelled from the AL as he opposed a politician nominated by the Combined Opposition Parties (COP) for the 1965 East Pakistan Provincial Assembly election. Abdul Khaleque died on 5 December 1965 in Jessore, East Pakistan, Pakistan.
