= Pervez Ali Shah =

Pakistani politician

Syed Pervez Ali Shah Jillani

Minister of State for Youth Affairs
- In office 1989–1990
- Prime Minister: Benazir Bhutto

Member of the National Assembly of Pakistan
- In office 1988–1990
- Constituency: NA-162 (Khairpur-I)

Personal details
- Died: November 2021 Khairpur, Sindh, Pakistan
- Party: Pakistan Peoples Party

Syed Pervez Ali Shah Jillani was a Pakistani politician. He was elected to the National Assembly of Pakistan from Khairpur in the 1988 Pakistani general election, and later served as Minister of State for Youth Affairs in the first government of Benazir Bhutto.

== Political career ==
Jillani remained associated with the PPP and with the party's opposition to the military government of General Zia-ul-Haq. He also imprisoned during that period.

In the 1988 Pakistani general election, he was elected to the National Assembly from NA-162 (Khairpur-I). During the first government of Prime Minister Benazir Bhutto, he served as minister of state for youth affairs.

== Personal life ==
Jillani belonged to a political family of Khairpur. He was a nephew of former Chief Minister of Sindh Syed Qaim Ali Shah and a brother of PPP politician Javed Ali Shah. His father, Ameer Ali Shah, also known as Dada Shah, was a prominent PPP figure in Khairpur politics.

== Death ==
Jillani died of a heart attack at his home in Khairpur in November 2021.
