= Amir Haider Kazmi =

Pakistani politician

Federal Minister for Health, Social Welfare and Special Education
- In office 1988–1990
- Prime Minister: Benazir Bhutto

Member of the National Assembly of Pakistan
- In office 1988–1990
- Constituency: NA-184 (Karachi West-I)

Personal details
- Died: 5 December 2013 London, England
- Party: Pakistan People's Party

Syed Amir Haider Kazmi was a Pakistani politician. He was elected to the National Assembly of Pakistan from Karachi in the 1988 Pakistani general election, and later served as federal minister for health, social welfare and special education in the first government of Benazir Bhutto.

== Political career ==
Kazmi was active in student and pro-democracy politics from the 1960s. He was arrested in 1960 for taking out a procession against General Ayub Khan, was expelled from Karachi and other cities in 1961 for his role in the students' movement, and later took part in Fatima Jinnah's presidential campaign in 1964.

In the 1988 Pakistani general election, he was elected to the National Assembly from NA-184 (Karachi West-I) as a PPP candidate. During the first government of Prime Minister Benazir Bhutto, Kazmi served as federal minister for health, social welfare and special education.

He remained active in PPP politics after leaving office.

== Death ==
Kazmi died in London on 5 December 2013 after a prolonged illness. His funeral was held in London, and he was survived by his widow, two sons and two daughters.
