= Ghulam Akbar Lasi =

Pakistani politician

- Born: Bela, Lasbela District, Balochistan, Pakistan
- Died: 7 November 2017; Karachi, Pakistan
- Education: University of Karachi (Master's degree)
- Occupation: Politician

Ghulam Akbar Lasi (Urdu: غلام اکبر لاسی; d. 7 November 2017, Karachi) was a Pakistani politician and member of National Assembly of Pakistan who served as deputy minister of labor during Benazir Bhutto cabinet. He served as vice-president of Pakistan People's Party Balochistan.

== Political career ==
Ghulam Akbar Lasi was born in village of outskirts of the historic town of Bela in the Lasbela district of Balochistan. He did his master's degree from Karachi University.

Lasi was elected to the National Assembly of Pakistan in the 1988 Pakistani general election from NA-272. Later he joined Pakistan Peoples Party due to issue with Jam Mohammad Yousaf.

He was re-elected to the National Assembly of Pakistan as a candidate of Pakistan Tehreek-e-Insaf (PPP) on from NA-272 (Lasbela-cum-Gwadar) in the 1993 Pakistani general election.

Ghulam Akbar Lasi died on 7 November 2017 in Karachi.
