= Shah Nawaz Junejo =

Pakistani politician

Minister of State
- In office 1988–1990
- Prime Minister: Benazir Bhutto

Member of the National Assembly of Pakistan
- In office 1988–1990
- Constituency: NA-181 (Sanghar-II)

Personal details
- Party: Pakistan People's Party

Shah Nawaz Junejo was a Pakistani politician. He was associated with the Pakistan People's Party (PPP), was elected to the National Assembly of Pakistan from Sanghar in the 1988 Pakistani general election, later served as a minister of state in the first government of Benazir Bhutto, and also remained a senator.

== Political career ==
Junejo started his political career from local government and was elected a district council member in 1962. He joined the Pakistan People's Party in the late 1960s.

In the 1988 Pakistani general election, he was elected to the National Assembly from NA-181 (Sanghar-II). He defeated former prime minister Muhammad Khan Junejo in that contest. After his election, he later served as a minister of state in the cabinet of Prime Minister Benazir Bhutto. He also remained a senator.

Junejo remained active in opposition politics during the Movement for the Restoration of Democracy. He imprisoned during the MRD movement.

== Personal life ==
Junejo belonged to Sanjar Khan Junejo village near Tando Adam in present-day Sanghar District. He was the father of Roshan Din Junejo and Muhammad Khan Junejo. His grandson Salahuddin Junejo was elected to the National Assembly in 2024.

Junejo died of cardiac failure at a hospital in Singapore on 14 July 2005. He was buried at his ancestral graveyard in Sanjar Khan Junejo village near Tando Adam.
