= Rehana Sarwar =

Pakistani politician

Federal Minister for Women Development
- In office 23 March 1989 – 6 August 1990
- Prime Minister: Benazir Bhutto

Member of the National Assembly of Pakistan
- In office 1988–1990
- Constituency: Women's reserved seat from Punjab

Member of the Provincial Assembly of the Punjab
- In office 1972–1977
- Constituency: PP-184 (Women's Constituency-IV)

Personal details
- Party: Pakistan People's Party

Rehana Sarwar was a Pakistani politician of the Pakistan People's Party (PPP). She served as a member of the Provincial Assembly of the Punjab from 1972 to 1977, as a member of the National Assembly of Pakistan from 1988 to 1990, and as federal minister for women development in the first government of Benazir Bhutto from 23 March 1989 to 6 August 1990. She was murdered in Lahore in July 2002.

== Political career ==
Sarwar was a member of the Provincial Assembly of the Punjab from PP-184 (Women's Constituency-IV) during the 1972–1977 assembly.

She later became a women member from Punjab in the 8th National Assembly of Pakistan, which sat from 1988 to 1990.

On 23 March 1989, she was inducted into the federal cabinet of Prime Minister Benazir Bhutto as minister for women development. She remained in office until the dismissal of Bhutto's government on 6 August 1990.

== Death ==
Sarwar was found shot dead in her car in Lahore in July 2002.
