= Jamali administration =

Central Government of Mir Zafarullah Khan Jamali
- 22nd Cabinet of Pakistan
- 2002–2004
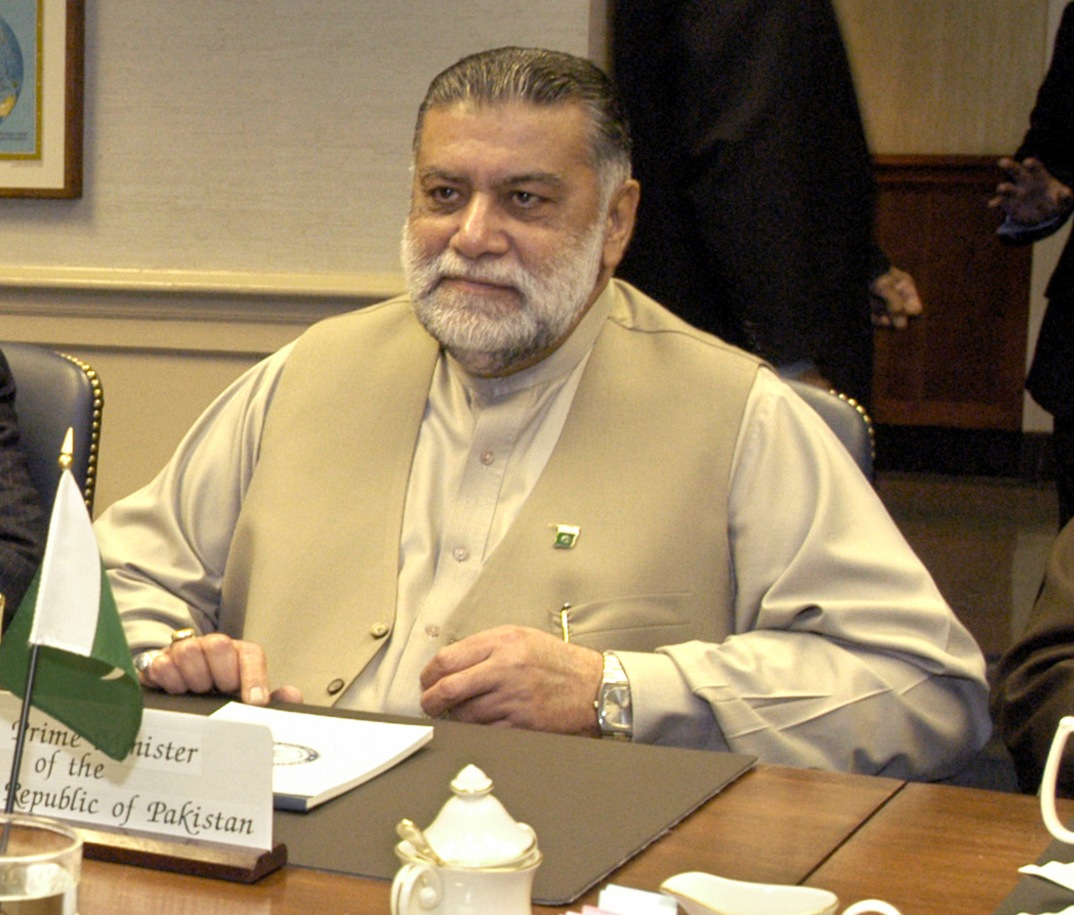
- Date formed: 23 November 2002
- Date dissolved: 26 June 2004

People and organisations
- Head of state: Pervez Musharraf
- Head of government: Zafarullah Khan Jamali
- Member party: PML-Q Coalition members: MMA; MQM National Alliance
- Opposition party: MMA
- Opposition leader: Maulana Fazlur Rehman

History
- Election: 2002 Pakistani general election
- Outgoing election: 1997 Pakistani general election
- Legislature term: 12th National Assembly of Pakistan
- Predecessor: Military government of Pervez Musharraf
- Successor: Chaudhry Shujaat Hussain ministry

The Jamali administration was the 22nd government and cabinet of Pakistan which was formed by Zafarullah Khan Jamali on 23 November 2002.

== Cabinet ==
=== Prime Minister ===
Minister	Portfolio	Period
Mir Zafarullah Khan Jamali	Prime Minister	23 November 2002 – 26 June 2004

=== Federal ministers ===
Minister	Portfolio	Period
Rao Sikandar Iqbal	Senior Federal Minister; Defence	23 November 2002 – 26 June 2004
Humayun Akhtar Khan	Commerce	23 November 2002 – 26 June 2004
Zubaida Jalal	Education	23 November 2002 – 26 June 2004
Yar Muhammad Rind	Food, Agriculture & Livestock	23 November 2002 – 26 June 2004
Khurshid Mahmud Kasuri	Foreign Affairs (addl.) Law, Justice & Human Rights	23 November 2002 – 26 June 2004
Muhammad Nasir Khan	Health	23 November 2002 – 26 June 2004
Liaquat Ali Jatoi	Industries & Production	23 November 2002 – 26 June 2004
Sheikh Rashid Ahmad	Information & Broadcasting	23 November 2002 – 26 June 2004
Faisal Saleh Hayat	Interior (addl.) Narcotics Control	23 November 2002 – 26 June 2004
Abdul Sattar Laleka	Labour, Manpower & Overseas Pakistanis	23 November 2002 – 13 February 2004
Awais Leghari	Information Technology & Telecommunications	23 November 2002 – 26 June 2004
Nouraiz Shakoor	Petroleum & Natural Resources	23 November 2002 – 26 June 2004
Ghous Bux Khan Maher	Railways	23 November 2002 – 26 June 2004
Aftab Ahmad Khan Sherpao	Water & Power (addl.) Kashmir Affairs & Northern Areas; States & Frontier Regions; Inter-Provincial Co-ordination	23 November 2002 – 26 June 2004
Shaukat Aziz	Finance & Revenue (addl.) Economic Affairs & Statistics; Planning & Development	10 April 2003 – 26 June 2004
Abdul Hafeez Shaikh	Privatisation	10 April 2003 – 26 June 2004
Ahmad Ali	Communications	2 June 2003 – 26 June 2004
Syed Safwanullah	Housing & Works	2 June 2003 – 26 June 2004
Ijaz-ul-Haq	Religious Affairs; Zakat & Ushr	24 March 2004 – 26 June 2004
Babar Khan Ghauri	Communications	24 March 2004 – 26 June 2004

=== Ministers of State ===
Minister	Portfolio	Period
Tahir Iqbal	Environment (In-charge)	23 November 2002 – 26 June 2004
Muhammad Raza Hayat Hiraj	Information Technology (addl.) Law, Justice & Human Rights; Parliamentary Affairs	23 November 2002 – 26 June 2004
Khalid Ahmad Khan Lund	Water & Power	23 November 2002 – 26 June 2004
Sikandar Hayat Khan Bosan	Food & Agriculture	23 November 2002 – 26 June 2004
Habibullah Warraich	Defence Production	23 November 2002 – 26 June 2004
Hamid Yar Hiraj	Health	23 November 2002 – 26 June 2004
Rais Munir Ahmed	Minorities; Culture, Sports, Tourism & Youth Affairs (In-charge)	23 November 2002 – 26 June 2004
