= Shafi-ur-Rahman Commission =

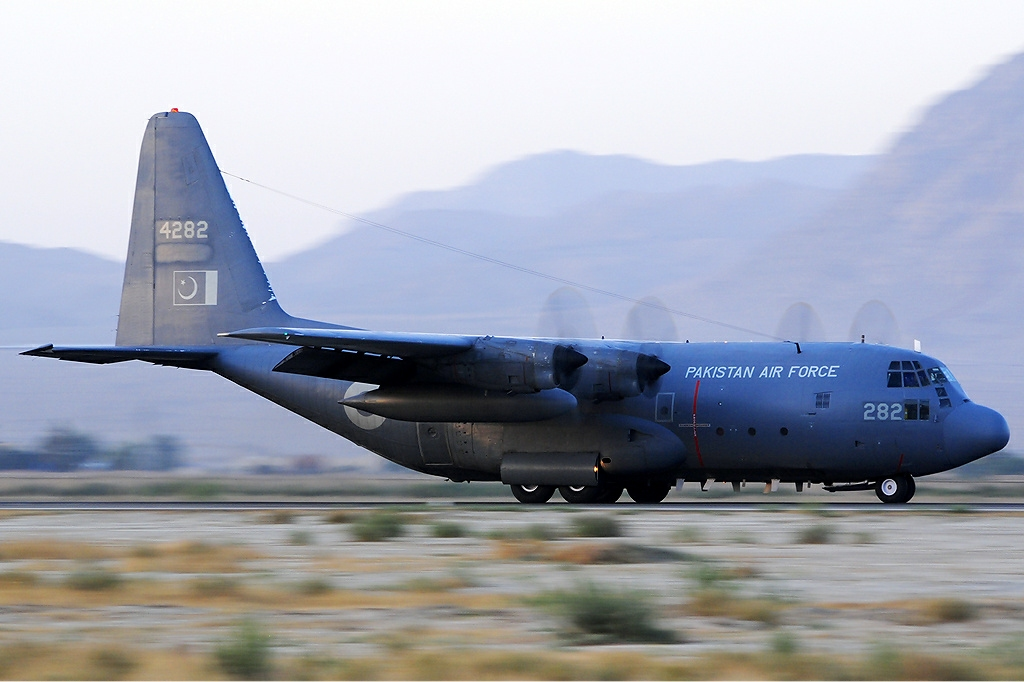
A PAF's C-130 was involved in the crash in 1988.

The Shafi ur Rahman Commission were a judicial inquiry papers investigated and authored by Senior Justice Shafi ur Rahman on the events leading to the fatal crash that resulted in the death of President General Zia-ul-Haq in August 1988.

The commission was formed by Prime Minister Nawaz Sharif in 1998, after various parties and individuals leveled up accusations against each other in their involvement in the event. The findings of the commissions remained to be secretive, and the commission's inquiries were obstructed by the military authorities on multiple occasions. The commission submitted its report of non-performance to Prime Minister's Secretariat, also in 1992.

== Bibliography ==
- Hanif, Mohammed (2008). A case of exploding mangoes (1st U.S. ed.). New York: Alfred A. Knopf. ISBN 0307269426.
- Haque, Mohd. Ashfraful (2013). Suppression of the Muslims: US Policy and the Muslim World. Bloomington, I.N. US: Archway Publishing Co. ISBN 1480800236.
- Haqqani, Husain (2005). Pakistan between mosque and military. Washington, D.C.: Carnegie Endowment for International Peace. ISBN 0870032852.
