= Shafi-ur-Rahman =

Pakistani judge (1929–2021)

NI Shafi ur Rahman

Senior Justice of the Supreme Court of Pakistan
- In office 31 July 1981 – 15 February 1994
- Appointed by: Muhammad Zia-ul-Haq

Justice of the Lahore High Court
- In office 1969–1979

Personal details
- Born: 16 February 1929 Varanasi, United Provinces, British India
- Died: 28 October 2021 (aged 92) Sarasota, Florida, U.S.
- Citizenship: Pakistani
- Education: Political Science (M.A) (1950), L.L.B (1951)
- Occupation: Judge
- Awards: Nishan-e-Imtiaz

Supreme Court of Pakistan

Shafi-ur-Rahman (16 February 1929 – 28 October 2021) was one of the longest serving judges of the Supreme Court of Pakistan. He was conferred the Nishan-i-Imtiaz for his meritorious services in the field of human rights. He is known for writing the Shafi–ur–Rehman Commission Report which is a highly classified document that has still not been publicly released. The report details the events leading to the rise to power and death of Muhammad Zia-ul-Haq, a military dictator who became the 6th President of Pakistan.

== Early life and education ==
Shafi-ur-Rahman was born in Varanasi, United Provinces, British India on 16 February 1929. He completed his Master of Arts in Political Science in 1950 and his Bachelor of Laws in 1951.

== Public service ==
=== Civil Services of Pakistan 1951–1959 ===
Civil Services – Batch of 1951

- Assistant Commissioner Lahore
- Assistant Commissioner Rajanpur
- Deputy Commissioner Bhawalpur

=== Judicial Services of Pakistan 1959–1994 ===
- Special Civil Judge Lahore
- Senior Civil Judge Lahore
- Additional Sessions Judge Lahore
- Registrar High Court West Pakistan
- District and Sessions Judge Abbottabad
- Divisional Judge Peshawar

==== Lahore High Court ====
Rahman served as a Judge in the Lahore High Court, which has jurisdiction over Punjab. His term started from 1969 to 1979, and from then on he was appointed to the Supreme Court of Pakistan

==== Supreme Court of Pakistan ====
Shafi ul Rahman was appointed as an Ad Hoc Judge of the apex court in 1979. He elevated to the Supreme Court of Pakistan as a Senior Justice on 31 July 1981 by Muhammad Zia-ul-Haq, the 6th President of Pakistan.

- Adhoc Judge 14 June 1979 to 29 July 1981
- Judge 31 July 1981 to 15 February 1994

== Other positions ==
- Chairman, Commission on Eradication of Corruption
- Chairman, Central Zakat Council Pakistan
- Acting Wafaqi Mohtasib (Federal Ombudsman) of Pakistan in 1983, 1984 and 1987
- Member Syndicate, Quaid-i-Azam University, Islamabad, Pakistan.
- Ahmed Kasuri Murder Inquiry Tribunal 1974
- President Gen. Zia ul Haq Plane Crash Inquiry Commission 1988 Shafi–ur–Rehman Commission

== Death ==
Shafi-ur-Rahman died on 28 October 2021, at the age of 92.

== Citations ==
- The Application of Islamic Criminal Law in Pakistan: Sharia in Practice by Tahir Wasti
- The Witch Doctor by A. B. S. Jafri
- 'Honour': Crimes, Paradigms and Violence Against Women by Sara Hossain, Lynn Welchman

== See also ==
- Supreme Court of Pakistan
- List of Pakistanis
