= Arif Mustafa Jatoi =

Pakistani politician

Member of the Provincial Assembly of Sindh
- In office 13 August 2018 – 11 August 2023
- Constituency: PS-36 Naushahro Feroze-IV

Personal details
- Party: Grand Democratic Alliance (2018-present)
- Parent: Ghulam Mustafa Jatoi (father)

Arif Mustafa Jatoi is a Pakistani politician who has been a member of the Provincial Assembly of Sindh from August 2018 till August 2023. Previously he was a member of the Provincial Assembly of Sindh from 2002 till 2008 and 2008 till 2013.

== Political career ==
He was elected to the Provincial Assembly of Sindh as a candidate of National Peoples Party from Constituency PS-19 (Naushahro Feroze-I) in the 2008 Pakistani general election. He received 53,302 votes and defeated Haji Khan Bhatti, a candidate of Pakistan Peoples Party (PPP).

He was re-elected to the Provincial Assembly of Sindh as a candidate of Grand Democratic Alliance from Constituency PS-36 (Naushahro Feroze-IV) in the 2018 Pakistani general election. He received 47,406 votes and defeated Zia-ul-Hassan, a candidate of Pakistan Peoples Party Parliamentarians (PPP).
