= Abdul Aleem (politician) =

Pakistani politician

Abdul Aleem was a Pakistani lawyer and politician who was a member of the East Bengal Legislative Assembly.

== Early life ==
Abdul Aleem was born in 1906 in Comilla. He practiced law at the Alipore Court at Calcutta and Calcutta High Court.

== Career ==
Abdul Aleem joined the Krishak Sramik Party in 1954. He was elected to the East Bengal Legislative Assembly as a Muslim candidate from Bakerganj Sadar.
