= Ghulam Ali Talpur =

Pakistani politician (1909-1963)

Minister of Interior
- In office 12 September 1956 – 18 March 1958
- Preceded by: Abdus Sattar
- Succeeded by: Feroz Khan Noon

Personal details
- Born: 19 September 1909 Tando Muhammad Khan
- Died: 19 October 1963 (aged 54) Tando Muhammad Khan

Military service
- Allegiance: Pakistan

Mir Ghulam Ali Talpur was a Pakistani politician. He was born 19 September 1909. He belonged to the Shahwani branch of the Talpur tribe. He was interior minister of Pakistan from 12 September 1956 to 18 March 1958.

== Early life and education ==
He got his school education from his native town, Tando Muhammad Khan. After school education he studied in Karachi for further education. He also studied in Aligarh. He completed his graduation from Bombay University.

== Political career ==
Mir Ghulam Ali Talpur Sr. started his political career in 1936, when he contested in election from Badin – Tando Bago constituency. He won this election and became a Member of the Legislative Assembly (MLA). He was elected President of the Local Board, Hyderabad twice. He became minister in Sir Ghulam Hussain Hidayat Ullah Sindh's cabinet from 28 April 1937 to 23 March 1938. He was federal minister for interior from 12 September 1956 to 18 March 1958.

He was speaker of the Sindh Assembly from 14 September 1953 to 21 March 1955. He was also abducted because he opposed One Unit Bill as speaker of assembly. He was sent to desert on camel after abduction.
