= Ghulam Mustafa Jatoi =

Pakistani politician (1931–2009)

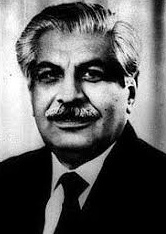

Caretaker Prime Minister of Pakistan
- In office 6 August 1990 – 6 November 1990
- President: Ghulam Ishaq Khan
- Preceded by: Benazir Bhutto
- Succeeded by: Nawaz Sharif

14th Chief Minister of Sindh
- In office 25 December 1973 – 5 July 1977
- Governor: Ra'ana Liaquat Ali Khan; Muhammad Dilawar Khanji
- Preceded by: Mumtaz Bhutto
- Succeeded by: Ghous Ali Shah

Personal details
- Born: 14 August 1931 New Jatoi, Bombay Presidency, British India (now Naushahro Feroze District, Sindh, Pakistan)
- Died: 20 November 2009 (aged 78) London, England
- Resting place: New Jatoi, Naushero Feroze
- Party: Pakistan Peoples Party (Before 1986); National Peoples Party (1986–2009)
- Children: Arif Mustafa Jatoi (son); Ghulam Murtaza Jatoi (son)
- Relatives: Liaquat Ali Jatoi (nephew)
- Education: University of Cambridge

Ghulam Mustafa Jatoi (Sindhi: غلام مصطفيٰ جتوئي; Urdu: غلام مصطفى جتوئی) (14 August 1931 – 20 November 2009) was a Pakistani politician who served as the Caretaker Prime Minister of Pakistan for three months, from 6 August 1990 to 6 November 1990.

== Early life ==
Ghulam Mustafa Jatoi was born in New Jatoi, Naushehro Feroze District, Sindh to an Sindhi family.He was the eldest of four brothers, and his grandfather, Khan Bahadur Imam Bux Khan Jatoi, was a member of the Bombay Legislative Assembly in 1923, 1927 and 1931. At the time there were only four members representing the entire present Province of Sindh.

His father Ghulam Rasool Jatoi was a member of the Sindh Legislative Assembly twice in 1946 and again 1952, after which one unit was imposed in West Pakistan.

Jatoi was educated at Karachi Grammar School and passed his senior Cambridge. In 1952, he went to England for his bar at law, but had to return home within one year due to his father's serious illness.

Mr Jatoi was an active leader in politics. He was one of the founding members of Pakistan Peoples Party along with Zulfikar Ali Bhutto. He was one of Bhutto's closest confidants until Bhutto's execution in 1979. He remained associated with the PPP until 1986 when he formed his own party with its emblem of a tractor, becoming one of Pakistan's political leaders with his own political party.

== Politics ==
Jatoi was elected to the first Provincial Assembly of West Pakistan in 1956. He has also served as chairman District Board of Nawabshah District in 1952, holding the distinction of being the youngest District Board chairman on the South Asia.

Jatoi along with Z.A. Bhutto and other politicians formed Pakistan People's Party in 1967. He has been elected to the National Assembly of Pakistan in 1962, 1965, 1970, 1989, 1990, 1993 and 1997. He has also been elected to the Sindh Provincial Assembly in 1973 and 1977.

He held the Portfolios of Political Affairs, Ports and Shipping, Communications, Petroleum and Natural Resources, Information Technology, Railways & Telecommunications in the Federal Government headed by Prime Minister Zulfikar Ali Bhutto. In 1973, he was elected Chief Minister of Sindh, and held this office until 1977. He has the distinction of being the longest serving Chief Minister of Sindh since the birth of Pakistan. After the imposition of Martial Law, Jatoi remained associated with the Movement for Restoration of Democracy (MRD). Twice he was arrested in 1983 and 1985.

Later, he founded the National Peoples Party. A number of political heavyweights from all over the country were brought into the National People's Party, launched under the chairmanship of Ghulam Mustafa Jatoi. Among them were Ghulam Mustafa Khar, Haneef Ramay, Hamid Raza Gilani and Kamal Azfar. An attractive manifesto was prepared and the party was expected to gain prominence due to the declining popularity of the Peoples Party at the time.

The NPP and the PML, then headed by Muhammad Khan Junejo, along with seven other political parties, contested the 1988 elections from the platform of the Islami Jamhoori Ittehad. The PPP won the bout, though with a thin majority.

== Interim Prime Minister ==
He was the Founder President of Islami Jamhoori Ittehad (IJI) formed in 1988. In 1989, he was elected to the National Assembly in by-elections from Kot Addu. Jatoi was subsequently elected leader of the combined opposition parties in the National Assembly in 1989.

Mr. Jatoi was appointed prime minister after the dismissal of the Benazir Bhutto government on corruption and incompetence charges by President Ghulam Ishaq Khan. In protest at the autocratic tendencies of the Nawaz Sharif, the then prime minister, Mr. Jatoi joined hands with the opposition led by Bhutto in launching a movement against the Sharif government, resulting in its dismissal in 1993.

The NPP contested the 1993 elections and later joined the Benazir Bhutto government as a coalition partner until the Governments dismissal in 1996 by the PPP President Farooq Leghari. In the 2002 general election, it was the dominant partner in a new group called the National Alliance which was chaired by him. The National Alliance won 16 seats in the national Assembly, 16 seats in the Sindh Assembly and three Senate seats.

== Family ==
In the 2008 election his son Ghulam Murtaza Khan Jatoi won election in NA-211 Naushahro Feroze-I under the banner of the National Peoples Party, defeating the runner-up PPP candidate and holding the seat won in 2002 by Dr. Abdul Ghaffar Khan Jatoi under the National Alliance banner. His other son, Arif Mustafa Jatoi (Former Food and Agriculture Minister) won PS-19 and another son, Masroor Jatoi won PS-23, both Provincial Assembly Seats. The Youngest son is Senator Asif Mustafa Jatoi. This has set a record wherein four sons are simultaneously present in all three Legislative forums, i.e. Provincial Assembly, National Assembly and Senate.

== Death ==
Ghulam Mustafa Jatoi died in London on Friday November 2009 after a protracted illness at the age of 78.

== Book ==
- Ghulam Mustafa Khan Jatoi, a Distinguished Parliamentarian: Selected Speeches, 1962-1990, Alvi Publishers, 1997, 166 p.

Political offices
Preceded by Mumtaz Bhutto	Chief Minister of Sindh; 1973–1977	Succeeded by Ghous Ali Shah
Preceded by Benazir Bhutto	Prime Minister of Pakistan; Caretaker; 1990	Succeeded by Nawaz Sharif
