= 1988 Pakistani general election =

- 16 November 1988

217 of the 237 seats in National Assembly 109 seats needed for a majority
- Registered: 47,629,892
- Turnout: 42.75% (▼10.95pp)
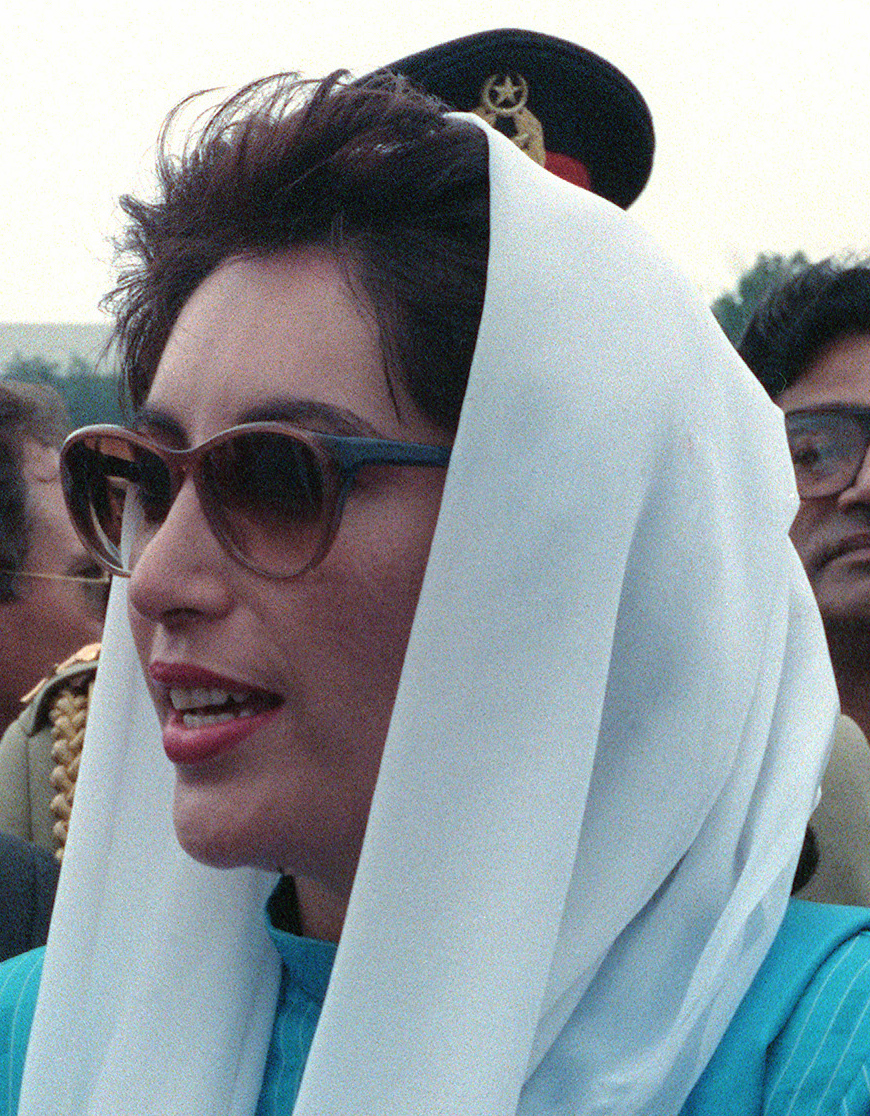

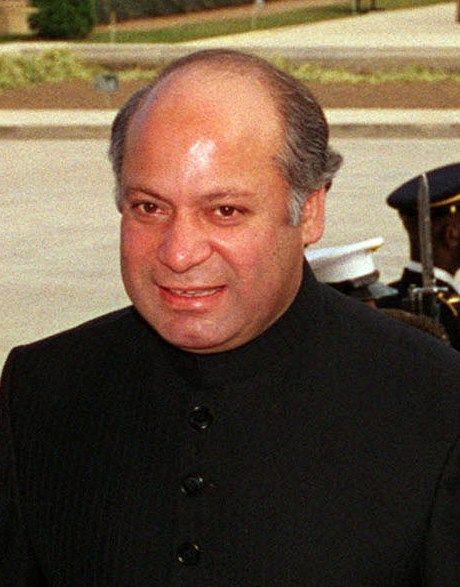
	First party	Second party
Leader	Benazir Bhutto	Nawaz Sharif
Party	PPP	IJI
Seats won	94	56
Popular vote	7,546,561	5,908,742
Percentage	37.66%	29.48%
- Map of Pakistan showing National Assembly Constituencies and winning parties
Prime minister before election
None (presidential rule)
Elected Prime minister
Benazir Bhutto
PPP

General elections were held in Pakistan on 16 November 1988 to elect the members of the National Assembly and Senate.

The elections saw the resurgence of Pakistan Peoples Party (PPP) under the leadership of Zulfikar Ali Bhutto's daughter, Benazir. Supporters of President Muhammad Zia-ul-Haq, who had died in August 1988, reorganised themselves into a nine-party alliance, the Islami Jamhoori Ittehad (IJI) with support from the intelligence agencies. This marked the beginning of a decade-long two-party system between the left-wing PPP and right-wing IJI and its successor the Pakistan Muslim League (N).

The PPP emerged as the biggest party, winning 94 of the 207 seats in the National Assembly. The IJI came second with 56 seats amidst a voter turnout of just 43%. The PPP was able to form a government with other left-wing parties, including the Muttahida Qaumi Movement (MQM), with Bhutto becoming the first female Prime Minister in a Muslim country.

== Background ==
Parliamentary elections had been held on 7 March 1977, with the PPP gaining a two-thirds majority. However, amid violence and civil disorder, Chief of Army Staff General Zia-ul-Haq ousted the prime minister Zulfikar Ali Bhutto in a military coup on 5 June, code-named Operation Fair Play. Martial law was lifted in 1985 when non-partisan and technocratic elections were held, resulting in Mohammad Junejo, a Sindhi lord, being appointed prime minister.

On 29 May 1988, the National Assembly which was elected in 1985 was dissolved prematurely by Zia, who also dismissed Junejo and the rest of his cabinet asserting that the 'administration was corrupt and inefficient'. The new polling date (exceeding the limit of 90 days following dissolution laid down by the Constitution of Pakistan) was set by the president on 20 July 1988. Moreover, it was also announced that the elections would be held on a non-party basis. However, on 2 October, following the accidental death of Zia on 17 August, the Supreme Court reversed the ban on parties and allowed the elections to be held on a party basis.

== Campaign ==
A total of 1,370 candidates contested the National Assembly elections. The campaign lasted for a month and remained generally peaceful.

After Zia's death, the democratic socialists and secular parties re-united and campaigned under the PPP's platform led by Benazir Bhutto; previously Zia had crushed the socialists' Movement for the Restoration of Democracy, which had attempted to overthrow his military regime, and took extremely tough actions to further disintegrate the movement. The PPP campaign pledged to control and tackle the extremism in Pakistan, and as well as curb the power of the trade unions. The conservatives under Sharif on other hand campaigned upon expanding the industrialisation and privatisation program;

The liberal Muttahida Qaumi Movement (MQM) did not formally contest the elections, but several of its members ran as independents.

== Results ==
Despite allegations of vote rigging against the PPP, and the use of the ID card rule to keep its less well-organized and relatively less well-off supporters from voting, Bhutto won the election by a margin of over 8%, thus managing to defeat the nine-party alliance of IJI.

MQM members running as independents received 5.4% of the vote, winning 13 seats in Karachi and Hyderabad.

The results in three Muslim constituencies were declared invalid; in the subsequent by-elections, the IJI won two seats and the PPP one. There were no candidates for the Ahmadi constituency.

Party	Votes	%	Seats
Pakistan Peoples Party	7,546,561	37.66	93
Islami Jamhoori Ittehad	5,908,742	29.48	54
Pakistan Awami Ittehad	857,684	4.28	3
Awami National Party	409,555	2.04	2
Jamiat Ulema-e-Islam (F)	360,526	1.80	7
Punjabi Pakhtun Ittehad	105,061	0.52	0
Pakistan National Party	104,442	0.52	0
National Peoples Party (Khar)	97,990	0.49	1
Pakistan Democratic Party	80,473	0.40	1
Balochistan National Alliance	71,058	0.35	2
Pakistan Muslim League (MQ)	55,052	0.27	0
Pakistan Milli Awai Ittehad	46,562	0.23	0
Jamiat Ulema-e-Islam (Darkhasti)	44,964	0.22	1
Tehreek-e-Jafaria (Arif Hussaini)	42,216	0.21	0
United Christians Front	15,918	0.08	1
All Pakistan Christians Movement	15,449	0.08	0
National Democratic Party	14,960	0.07	0
Pakistan Mazdoor Kissan Party	6,652	0.03	0
Jamaat-e-Ahl-e-Hadees Pakistan	5,225	0.03	0
Pakistan Masihi League	4,324	0.02	0
Pakistan Christians National Party	3,386	0.02	0
Tehreek-e-Inqalab-Islam Pakistan	2,807	0.01	0
Pakistan Muslim League (Qayyum)	2,196	0.01	0
Hazara Front (Mahaz-e-Hazara)	1,814	0.01	0
Pakistan Muslim League (Forward Block)	1,713	0.01	0
Awami National Party (Ainee Group)	1,018	0.01	0
Pakistan Qaumi Mahaz-e-Azadi	999	0.00	0
Pakistan National Democratic Alliance	388	0.00	0
Jamaat-e-Ahl-e-Sunnat Pakistan	351	0.00	0
National Muslim League (Muhasba Group)	282	0.00	0
Wattan Party	184	0.00	0
Independents	4,232,679	21.12	48
Seats reserved for women			20
Vacant			4
Total	20,041,231	100.00	237
Valid votes	20,041,231	98.43	
Invalid/blank votes	319,826	1.57	
Total votes	20,361,057	100.00	
Registered voters/turnout	47,629,892	42.75	
Source: CLEA

== Aftermath ==
In light of the election results, acting president Ghulam Ishaq Khan invited the PPP to form a government. The PPP formed the government, making alliances with small parties and independent groups. On 4 December 1988, Bhutto was elected as the first female prime minister of a Muslim country. The new Cabinet, headed by Bhutto was subsequently announced.

The MQM was pivotal in the formation of central government, as the PPP had failed to win a majority of seats. However, the MQM left the coalition in October 1989 when differences developed after dozens were killed at an MQM congregation by Sindhi nationalists, and the alliance fell apart in the wake of ensuing violence. The MQM lent its support to Nawaz Sharif's Islami Jamhoori Ittehad instead.
