= National People's Party (Pakistan) =

National People's Party نیشنل پیپلز پارٹی
- Abbreviation: NPP
- Chairman: Ghulam Murtaza Khan Jatoi
- Founder: Ghulam Mustafa Jatoi
- Founded: 1986
- Dissolved: 2018
- Merged into: Grand Democratic Alliance
- Headquarters: Karachi
- Student wing: National People's Students Federation (NPSF)
- Ideology: Secularism
- National affiliation: National Alliance; Grand Democratic Alliance
- Colors: Red, white and green

Election symbol
- Tractor

Party flag
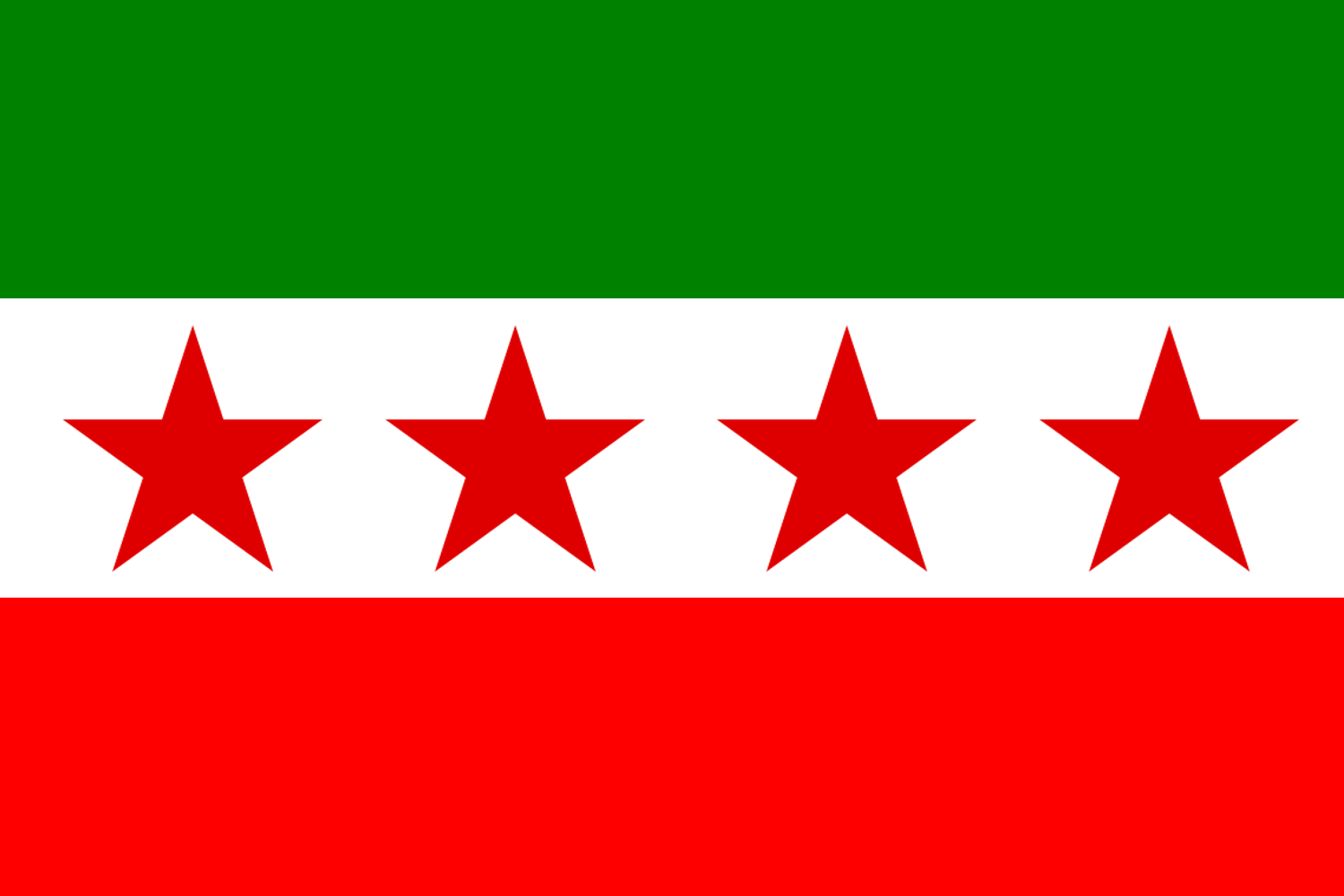

The National People's Party (NPP) (Urdu: نیشنل پیپلز پارٹی) was a political party located in Pakistan (most active in the province of Sindh and southern parts of Punjab). It was founded in 1986 by Ghulam Mustafa Jatoi after he had a disagreement with Benazir Bhutto, subsequently leaving the Pakistan Peoples Party.

In the 2008 Pakistani general elections, the party only managed to win one seat in the National Assembly. Ghulam Mustafa's son Ghulam Murtaza Khan Jatoi won the election in NA-211 Naushahro Feroze-I, holding the seat won in 2002 elections by Dr. Abdul Ghaffar Khan Jemms under the National Alliance banner. The party also won four provincial seats, all in the Sindh province.

In May 2013, the party merged with the Pakistan Muslim League (N).

It was later merged in GDA in 2018, when its leader Ghulam Murtaza Jatoi joined GDA before 2018 general elections.

== Formation ==
The National People's Party was founded in 1986 by Ghulam Mustafa Jatoi, who brought together a number of political heavyweights from all over Pakistan under its banner. Among them were former Pakistan People's Party stalwarts and Punjab Chief Ministers Ghulam Mustafa Khar and Hanif Ramay, as well as former federal ministers: S.M. Zafar, Hamid Raza Gilani, Malik Hamid Sarfraz, Nawab Ghaus Bux Raisani, Kamal Azfar, Mian Sajid Pervaiz, Nafees Siddiqui, Rana Muhammad Hanif Khan, Akhtar Hussain Shah, Rabbani Khar and Aftab Shah Gilani. A manifesto was prepared and the party was expected to rise to prominence quickly due to the declining popularity of the People's Party. Now, it is declining due to insufficient leadership. Irfan Abbasi was the media coordinator of the National People's Party He had also worked in the Sukkur Division as an information secretary. Soon after, he was kicked out of the party due to allying with the Pakistan People's Party.

== IJI Coalition ==
In September 1988, the newly formed NPP, the center-right Pakistan Muslim League headed by Muhammad Khan Junejo, and the religious-political Jamaat-e-Islami headed by Qazi Hussain Ahmad along with six other political parties formed an anti-PPP coalition called Islami Jamhoori Ittehad or simply IJI. It was believed that the Pakistan Army intelligence agency, the ISI, under Lt Gen Hamid Gul, had a major role in the formation of IJI, as the army was always at odds with the left-leaning PPP.

The 1988 elections were still won by the PPP but with a thin majority. However, only 20 months into office, the PPP government was dismissed by the President Ghulam Ishaq Khan on corruption charges, and IJI won the next elections comfortably leading Nawaz Sharif from IJI to be the next prime minister. The coalition ended in 1993 when a major chunk of IJI became PML (Nawaz).

== Founding National Alliance ==
For the 2002 general elections, NPP joined the pro-Musharraf government's loose political coalition, the National Alliance. The other alliance members were the Millat Party, the Sindh Democratic Alliance and the Sindh National Front. The alliance won 16 out of 342 seats, mainly in the interior Sindh and lower Punjab region, or 4.78% of the total votes.

== Merger and separation with PML ==
In May 2004, various PML factions and other political parties, including the National Alliance, merged with the PML-Q to form a united Pakistan Muslim League (PML). However, the understanding did not last long and NPP separated from the ruling PML and contested the 2008 elections on a its own platform.

The party won three seats in the 2008 elections in the Sindh Provincial Assembly and one National Assembly seat.

In May 2013, National People's Party announced its merger with the Pakistan Muslim League (N).

It was later merged in GDA in 2018, when its leader Ghulam Murtaza Jatoi joined GDA before 2018 general elections.

== See also ==
- List of political parties in Pakistan
- Pakistan Peoples Party
- Politics of Pakistan
