= List of members of the 2nd Constituent Assembly of Pakistan =

2nd Constituent Assembly of Pakistan
←	1st	3rd	→
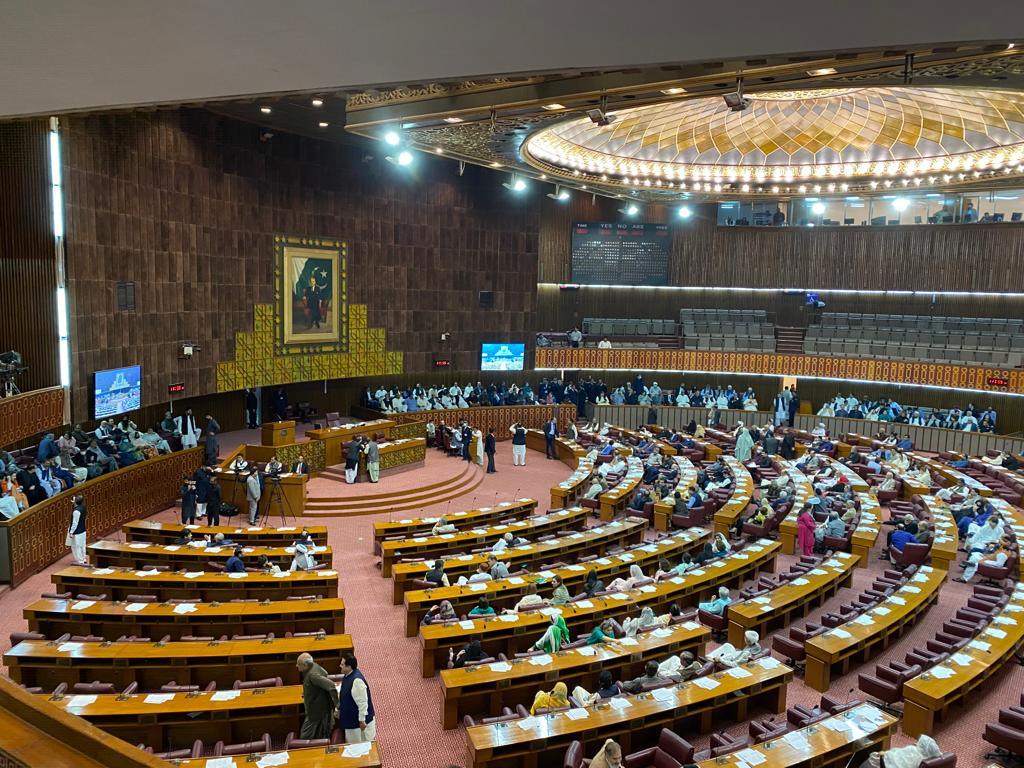

Overview
- Legislative body: Constituent Assembly of Pakistan (1955–1956); National Assembly of Pakistan (1956–1958)
- Jurisdiction: Pakistan
- Term: 1955 – 1958
- Election: 1955 Pakistani Constituent Assembly election
- Government: Government of Pakistan
- Website: Official website

Sovereign
- Members: 72
- President: Iskander Mirza

The 2nd Parliament of Pakistan (1955–1958) was the unicameral legislature of Pakistan formed after the first Constituent Assembly of Pakistan was dissolved by Governor-General of Pakistan Malik Ghulam Muhammad. There were 72 members of parliament, including 40 from East Bengal, 21 from West Punjab, 4 from the North-West Frontier Province, 5 from Sindh, 1 from Balochistan and 1 from Karachi.

== East Bengal ==
1. Abdul Aleem
2. Abdul Karim
3. Muhammad Abdul Khaleque
4. Abdul Wahab Khan
5. Abdul Rahman Khan
6. Abdus Sattar
7. Abdul Mansur Ahmad
8. Adeluddin Ahmad
9. Ataur Rahman Khan
10. Athar Ali
11. Gour Chandra Bala
12. Canteswar Barman
13. Abdul Latif Biswas
14. Hamidul Huq Choudhury
15. Nurul Huq Choudhury
16. Yusuf Ali Chowdhury
17. Akshay Kumar Das
18. Basanta Kumar Das
19. A.H. Deldar Ahmed
20. Bhupendra Kumar Datta
21. Kamini Kumar Dutta
22. Farid Ahmad
23. A. K. Fazlul Huq
24. Sardar Fazlul Karim
25. Fazlur Rahman
26. Peter Paul Gomez
27. Lutfur Rahman Khan
28. Mahfuzul Huq
29. Mahmud Ali
30. Rasa Raj Mandal
31. Misbahuddin Hussain
32. Mohammad Ali Bogra
33. Moslem Ali Molla
34. Sheikh Mujibur Rahman
35. Muzaffar Ahmed
36. Nurur Rahman
37. Sailendra Kumar Sen
38. Huseyn Shaheed Suhrawardy
39. Abdur Rashid Tarkabagish
40. Sheikh Zahiruddin

== Punjab ==
1. Mian Abdul Bari
2. Abdul Hamid Khan
3. Syed Abid Hussain Shah
4. Amir Azam Khan Karachi
5. Amir Mohammad Khan
6. Chaudhry Aziz Din
7. Muhammad Hussain
8. Abdul Hameed Khan
9. Mian Mumtaz Muhammad Daultana
10. Abdul Ghani Ishiana
11. Malik Faiz
12. C.E. Gibbon
13. Alamdar Hussain Shah
14. Mushtaq Ahmed
15. Mian Iftikharuddin
16. Iskandar Mirza
17. Mozaffar Ali Khan
18. Iftikhar Hussain Khan Mamdot
19. Balakh Sher Mazari
20. Mohammad Ali
21. Makhad Mohyuddin
22. Ch Jahan Khan Busal
23. Feroz Khan Noon

== North-West Frontier Province ==
1. Abdul Rashid Khan
2. Jaffer Shah
3. Jalal-ud-din Jalal Baba
4. M.R. Kayani

== Sindh ==
- M.A. Khuhro
- Siroomal Kirpaldas
- Ali Muhammad Rashidi
- Moula Bakhsh Soomro
- Ghulam Ali Khan
- Sardar Khan Khoso

== Balochistan ==
- Khan Sahib

== Karachi ==
1. Yusuf A. Haroon

== Changes in members of Second Constitutional Assembly ==
=== August, 1955 ===
1. Mian Abdus Salam
2. Ahmad Nawaz Shah
3. Mir Bai Khan
4. M.A.H. Jahan Zeb
5. Jahangir Khan Maddakhel
6. Mehrdil Khan Mahsud
7. Waris Khan
8. M.H. Kizilbash

=== March, 1956 ===
1. I.I. Chundrigarh
2. Mozaffar Ali Khan
3. Abdur Rashid Khan

=== October, 1956 ===
1. Ramizudin Ahmad
2. Syed Amjad Ali
3. Akber Hussain Akhund

=== January, 1958 ===
- Mian Gul Aurangzeb
- Nadir Ali Shah
- Akber Khan Bughti
- Dingomal N. Ramchandan
