= 1955 Pakistani Constituent Assembly election =

Indirect Election in Pakistan

Second Pakistani Constituent Assembly election
- 21 June 1955

72 seats in the Constituent Assembly 37 seats needed for a majority
- Registered: 404
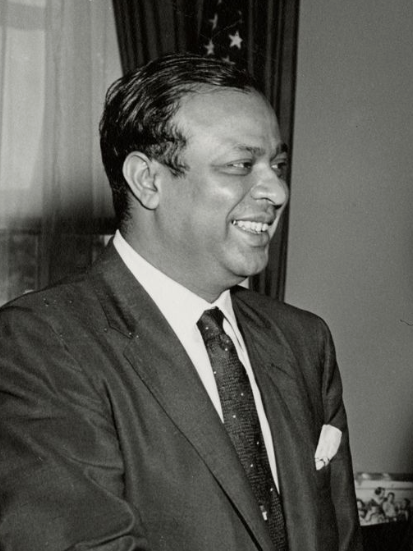

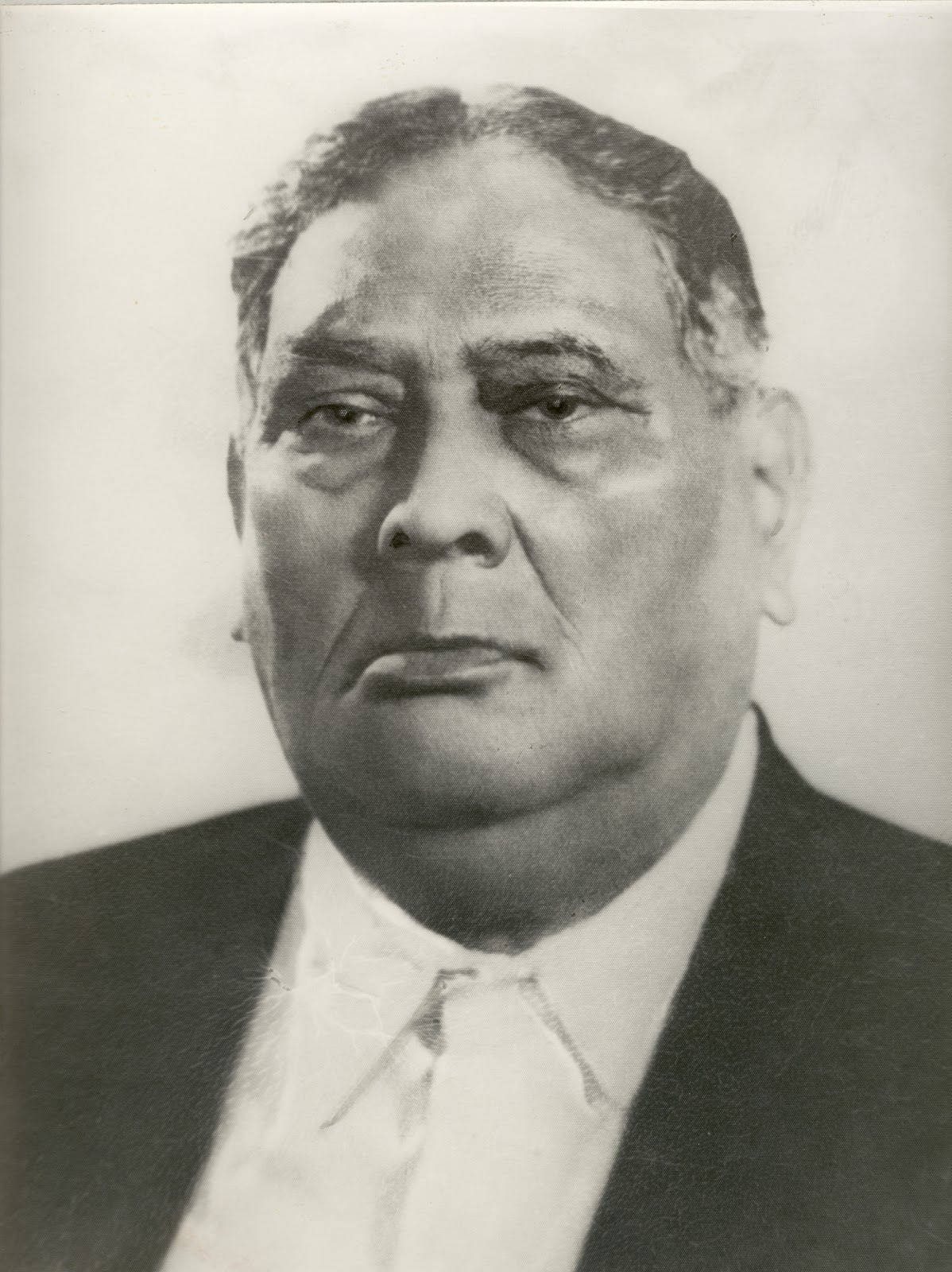

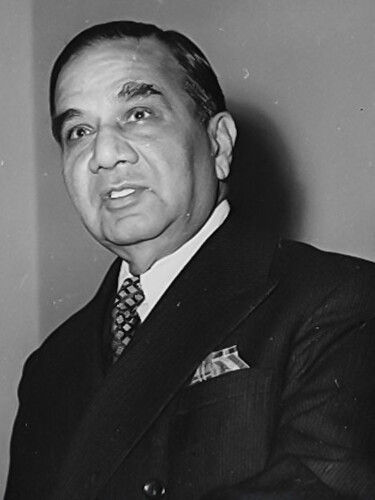
	First party	Second party	Third party
Leader	Mohammad Ali Bogra	A. K. Fazlul Huq	Huseyn Shaheed Suhrawardy
Party	PML	UF	AL
Leader since	1953	1954	1950
Last election	59	New	New
Seats won	25	16	12
Seat change	▼34	▲16	▲12
Prime Minister before election
Mohammad Ali Bogra
PML
New Prime Minister
Chaudhri Muhammad Ali
PML–UF coalition

On 21 June 1955, seven years after the independence of Pakistan, the election for the Second Constituent Assembly was held through the votes of provincial members of all provinces of the country. The resulting Assembly remained in existence until 1958, when it was dissolved following the imposition of military rule by the interim president Iskander Mirza.

On 24 October 1954, governor-general Malik Ghulam Muhammad dissolved the first Constituent Assembly, leading to another Constituent Assembly election in the Dominion of Pakistan. Because there was no constitution or procedures for a general election, the election was conducted indirectly through members of the provincial assemblies. Multiple political parties from both Eastern and Western Pakistan participated in the election.

As the founding party of the country, the Pakistan Muslim League (PML) achieved significant dominance in the Western provinces. However, in East Bengal, parties such as the All-Pakistan Awami League (AL) and the United Front (UF) won seats, intensifying political competition. As no single party secured a majority, the PML and UF formed a coalition government. The new Constituent Assembly drafted Pakistan's first constitution in 1956, which declared the country an Islamic Republic.

== Background ==
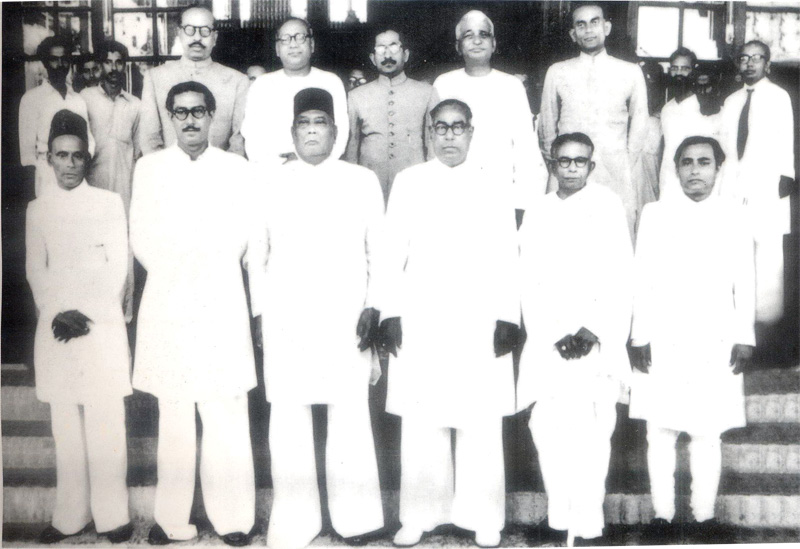
After 1954 East Bengal Legislative Assembly election, the United Front acquired majority in East Bengal and formed third Huq ministry.

In 1947, members of Pakistan's Constituent Assembly were elected indirectly by Muslim legislators from the Muslim-majority provinces of British India. However, after Pakistan's independence, this composition changed following provincial elections: West Punjab and the North-West Frontier in 1951, Sindh in 1953, and East Bengal in 1954. In three provinces, the Pakistan Muslim League (PML) achieved majority. However, the exception was East Bengal where a four-party coalition named United Front (Note: consisted of East Pakistan Awami League (EPAL), Ganatantri Dal (GD) Krishak Sramik Party (KSP) and Nizam-e-Islam Party (NIP). Later GD and EPAL left the coalition.) (UF) won the most seats.

As a result, the legislative assemblies of West Punjab and the North-West Frontier Province demanded that the Constituent Assembly members be replaced with newly elected provincial legislators. The East Bengal Assembly further called for the complete dissolution of the existing Constituent Assembly and fresh elections. On 8 April 1954, Khan Abdul Ghaffar Khan supported this demand, urging that new members from East Bengal be included in a reconstituted Assembly. Their demands were opposed by the PML and its leader and prime minister Mohammad Ali Bogra, who resisted the inclusion of new East Bengal members to maintain his political position. At the time, there was dispute among politicians about One Unit Scheme as East Bengal had the significant population to dominate the national politics. The Bengali–Punjabi controversy was slowing down the constitution making process.

Tensions peaked on 24 October 1954, when governor-general Malik Ghulam Muhammad dissolved the Constituent Assembly. This move came after the Assembly passed legislation limiting his powers, making them subject to cabinet decisions and enhancing the prime minister's authority. The new law also revoked the governor-general's authority to dissolve the Assembly. The governor-general proclaimed to held elections for the Constituent Assembly and directed prime minister to reform central cabinet. In response, Maulvi Tamizuddin Khan, president of the dissolved Assembly, challenged the action by filing a case in the federal court.

The sudden dissolution created uncertainty regarding how a new Constituent Assembly would be elected within a short time. Since Pakistan had no constitution at the time, and the Indian Independence Act did not contain any provision related to elections for the assembly, the government faced legal challenges, making direct elections impossible. (Note: also, the act did not specify period or dissolution method of the assembly.) Consequently, the governor-general announced that a "Constitutional Convention" would be summoned through indirect elections.

On 10 May 1955, the Federal Court dismissed Tamizuddin Khan's case and declared that the governor-general's assent was essential for any legislation to be valid. It ruled that the governor-general had the power to dissolve the Constituent Assembly and that there was no scope for the creation of any representative body called the Constitutional Convention. The court directed the government to form new constituent assembly by elections. On 22 May 1955, the governor-general validated the 1949 Constituent Assembly Act and restructured and increased the number of assembly seats. In 28 May, a special issue of the Gazette of Pakistan announced that the Constituent Assembly elections would be held on 21 June 1955.

== Nominations ==
In Western Pakistan, a rebel faction of the PML led by Feroz Khan Noon contested the elections in West Punjab under the same party name – here referred to as PML (Noon), later taking the name Republican Party – against the 30 officially approved candidates of the PML. Meanwhile, in the North-West Frontier Province, Khan Abdul Qayyum Khan became a rebel candidate against the party, while the All-Pakistan Awami League (AL) also participated in the elections from the province under the leadership of Amin ul-Hasanat. (Note: also known as Pir of Manki Sharif.) However, the AL candidates later withdrew their nominations. From West Punjab, Mian Abdul Bari, a member of All-Pakistan Awami League, contested as an independent politician. In the province of Baluchistan, Sardar Muhammad Anwar Jan Khetran, opposition leader of the Shahi Jirga (the grand council of tribal elders), contested against Khan Abdul Jabbar Khan.

In East Bengal, a parliamentary committee of the UF was formed for the election, headed by A. K. Fazlul Huq. The alliance decided to nominate individuals from outside the legislature. Additionally, the PML decided to field candidates in the province and called a parliamentary committee meeting in 12 June. Meanwhile, a dispute arose in the province between provincial leader Abdul Hamid Khan Bhashani and central leader Huseyn Shaheed Suhrawardy over the list of candidates from the AL. A total of 26 candidates were nominated from the UF and 18 from the AL; Mohammad Ali Bogra was the only PML candidate in the province.

== Results ==
Seat distribution by political party in the election
1. PML (34.7%)
2. UF (22.2%)
3. AL (16.7%)
4. PNC (5.55%)
5. PML (Noon) (4.16%)
6. SCF (4.16%)
7. UPP (2.77%)
8. Independents (9.72%)

On 21 June 1955, in West Punjab, 12 candidates from the PML, 2 from the PML (Noon), and 1 candidate from the minority community were declared elected. Based on two rounds of preferential voting by 104 members of the legislatures in Western Pakistan, 21 out of 26 elected candidates were members of the PML. Among the elected, 1 was from the Federal Capital Territory (FCT), 5 from Sindh, 15 from West Punjab, 4 from the North-West Frontier Province, and 1 from Baluchistan. The PML won all Muslim seats from the FCT, Sindh, Baluchistan, and North-West Frontier Province. The primary result excluded the names of 6 more elected members from West Punjab. In 22 June, the names were announced. Three of them were from the PML. On the same day, based on the votes of 300 legislative members from East Bengal, 16 candidates from the UF, 12 from the AL, 4 from the Pakistan National Congress (PNC), 3 from the East Bengal Scheduled Castes Federation (SCF), 2 from the United Progressive Party (UPP), 2 independents, and 1 from the PML were declared elected.

In total, 76 members were elected: 25 from the PML, 16 from the UF, 12 from the AL, 3 from the PML (Noon), 4 from the PNC, 2 from the UPP, 3 from the East Bengal SCF, and 7 Independents. Members of Constituent Assembly were elected by the members of provincial assemblies, with the exception of the FCT whose only member was elected by the Karachi Municipal Committee.

Party	Votes	%	Seats
Pakistan Muslim League			25
United Front			16
All-Pakistan Awami League			12
Pakistan National Congress			4
Pakistan Muslim League (Noon)			3
East Bengal Scheduled Castes Federation			3
United Progressive Party			2
Independents			7
Total			72
Registered voters/turnout	404	–	
Source: The Azad

=== Elected members ===
Region	Winner	Party			
Region	Winner	Baluchistan	Khan Abdul Jabbar Khan		IND (Note: Although he was a supporter of the Pakistan Muslim League, he contested the election as an independent.)
Region	East Bengal	Mohammad Ali Bogra		PML	
A. K. Fazlul Huq	East Bengal		UF		
Athar Ali	East Bengal		UF		
Hamidul Huq Choudhury	East Bengal		UF		
Yusuf Ali Chowdhury	East Bengal		UF		
Abdul Latif Biswas	East Bengal		UF		
Mahfuzul Huq	East Bengal		UF		
Nurul Huq Choudhury	East Bengal		UF		
Mahmud Ali	East Bengal		UF		
Abdul Sattar	East Bengal		UF		
Abdul Wahab Khan	East Bengal		UF		
Abdul Karim	East Bengal		UF		
Abdul Aleem	East Bengal		UF		
Syed Misbahuddin Hussain	East Bengal		UF		
Lutfur Rahman Khan	East Bengal		UF		
Adeluddin Ahmad	East Bengal		UF		
Farid Ahmad	East Bengal		UF		
Huseyn Shaheed Suhrawardy	East Bengal		AL		
Ataur Rahman Khan	East Bengal		AL		
Abul Mansur Ahmad	East Bengal		AL		
Sheikh Mujibur Rahman	East Bengal		AL		
Sheikh Zahiruddin	East Bengal		AL		
Nurur Rahman	East Bengal		AL		
A.H. Deldar Ahmed	East Bengal		AL		
Moslem Ali Mollah	East Bengal		AL		
Abdur Rashid Tarkabagish	East Bengal		AL		
Abdur Rahman Khan	East Bengal		AL		
Muzaffar Ahmed	East Bengal		AL		
Muhammad Abdul Khaleque	East Bengal		AL		
Basanta Kumar Das	East Bengal		PNC		
Bhupendra Kumar Datta	East Bengal		PNC		
Canteswar Barman	East Bengal		PNC		
Peter Paul Gomez	East Bengal		PNC		
Sailendra Kumar Sen	East Bengal		UPP		
Kamini Kumar Dutta	East Bengal		UPP		
Rasaraj Mandal	East Bengal		SCF		
Gour Chandra Bala	East Bengal		SCF		
Akshay Kumar Das	East Bengal		SCF		
Fazlur Rahman	East Bengal		IND		
Sardar Fazlul Karim	East Bengal		IND		
Federal Capital Territory	Yusuf Haroon		PML		
North-West Frontier Province	Abdur Rashid Khan		PML		
North-West Frontier Province	Mian Jaffer Shah		PML		
North-West Frontier Province	Jalal Baba		PML		
North-West Frontier Province	M. R. Kayani		PML		
Sindh	Muhammad Ayub Khuhro		PML		
Sindh	Ali Muhammad Rashidi		PML		
Sindh	Mir Ghulam Ali Khan Talpur		PML		
Sindh	Moula Baksh Soomro		PML		
Sindh	Siroomal Kirpaldass		IND		
West Punjab	Chaudhri Muhammad Ali		PML		
West Punjab	Iskander Mirza		PML		
West Punjab	Syed Abid Hussain Shah		PML		
West Punjab	Sardar Amir Azam Khan		PML		
West Punjab	Mushtaq Ahmed Gurmani		PML		
West Punjab	Syed Mohyuddin Lal Badshah		PML		
West Punjab	Chaudri Muhammad Hussain Chatta		PML		
West Punjab	Soofi Abdul Hameed Khan		PML		
West Punjab	Syed Alamdar Hussain Gilani		PML		
West Punjab	Abdul Hamid Khan Dasti		PML		
West Punjab	Chaudry Aziz Din		PML		
West Punjab	Mumtaz Daultana		PML		
West Punjab	Iftikhar Hussain Khan Mamdot		PML		
West Punjab	Malik Amir Mohammad Khan		PML		
West Punjab	Chaudhry Abdul Ghani Ghuman		PML		
West Punjab	Feroz Khan Noon		PML (Noon)		
West Punjab	Muzaffar Ali Khan Qizilbash		PML (Noon)		
West Punjab	Balakh Sher Mazari		PML (Noon)		
West Punjab	Cecil Edward Gibbon		IND		
West Punjab	Mian Iftikharuddin		IND		
West Punjab	Mian Abdul Bari		IND		

=== Reactions and controversies ===
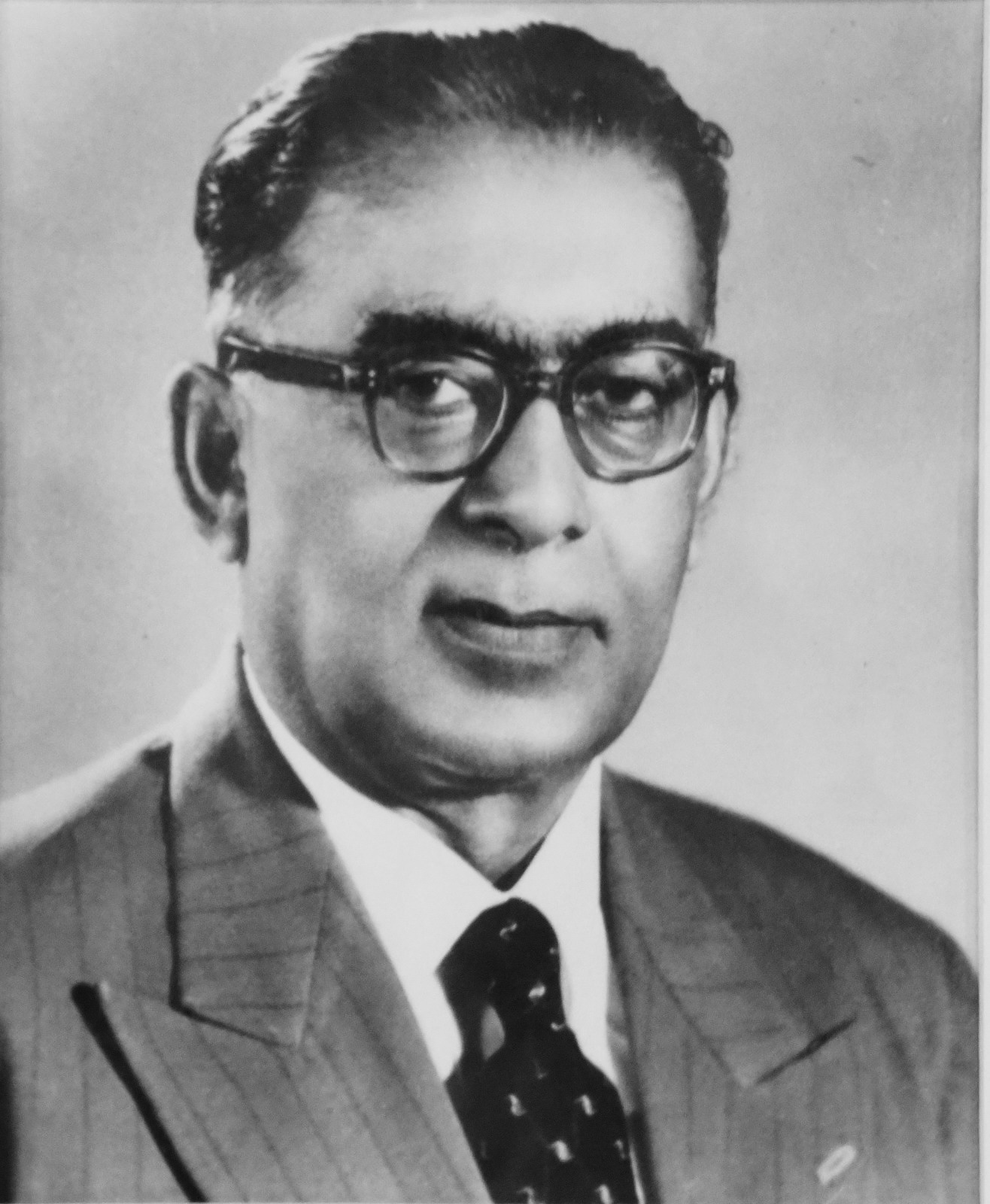
According to Punjabi politician Feroz Khan Noon, the election's voting was a "Gestapo method".

At first, UF leader A. K. Fazlul Huq opposed the decision to hold a constitutional convention and demanded the formation of a new Constituent Assembly through a vote by legislative members. A mission from Karachi failed to convince him to support the convention. AL leader Huseyn Shaheed, then the law minister, expressed concern that UF opposition could invalidate the convention and lead to martial law or an armed revolution in Pakistan. Following his statement, the UF severed ties with him and suspended Ataur Rahman Khan, Sheikh Mujibur Rahman, and Abul Mansur Ahmad of the AL from the alliance. Meanwhile, Abdul Hamid Khan Bhashani, leader of the East Pakistan Awami League, conditionally accepted the convention on the basis that the UF's 21-point demands be implemented and that proposed constitution be written in both Urdu and Bengali. Later, with Suhrawardy's assurances, the party gave its unconditional consent to join the convention. On 17 May 1955, A. K. Fazlul Huq announced a province-wide campaign for the elections. Politician Feroz Khan Noon criticized the voting method, calling it a "Gestapo method", and alleged that although the federal court had ordered secrecy of the ballot, it was absent in this election and voters' choices could be known. Huseyn Shaheed Suhrawardy claimed that there was electoral fraud in the provincial elections of West Punjab, North-West Frontier and princely state Bahwalpur and as the new Constituent Assembly members are elected by provincial members, the PML members of the Constituent Assembly are unrepresentative.

== Aftermath ==
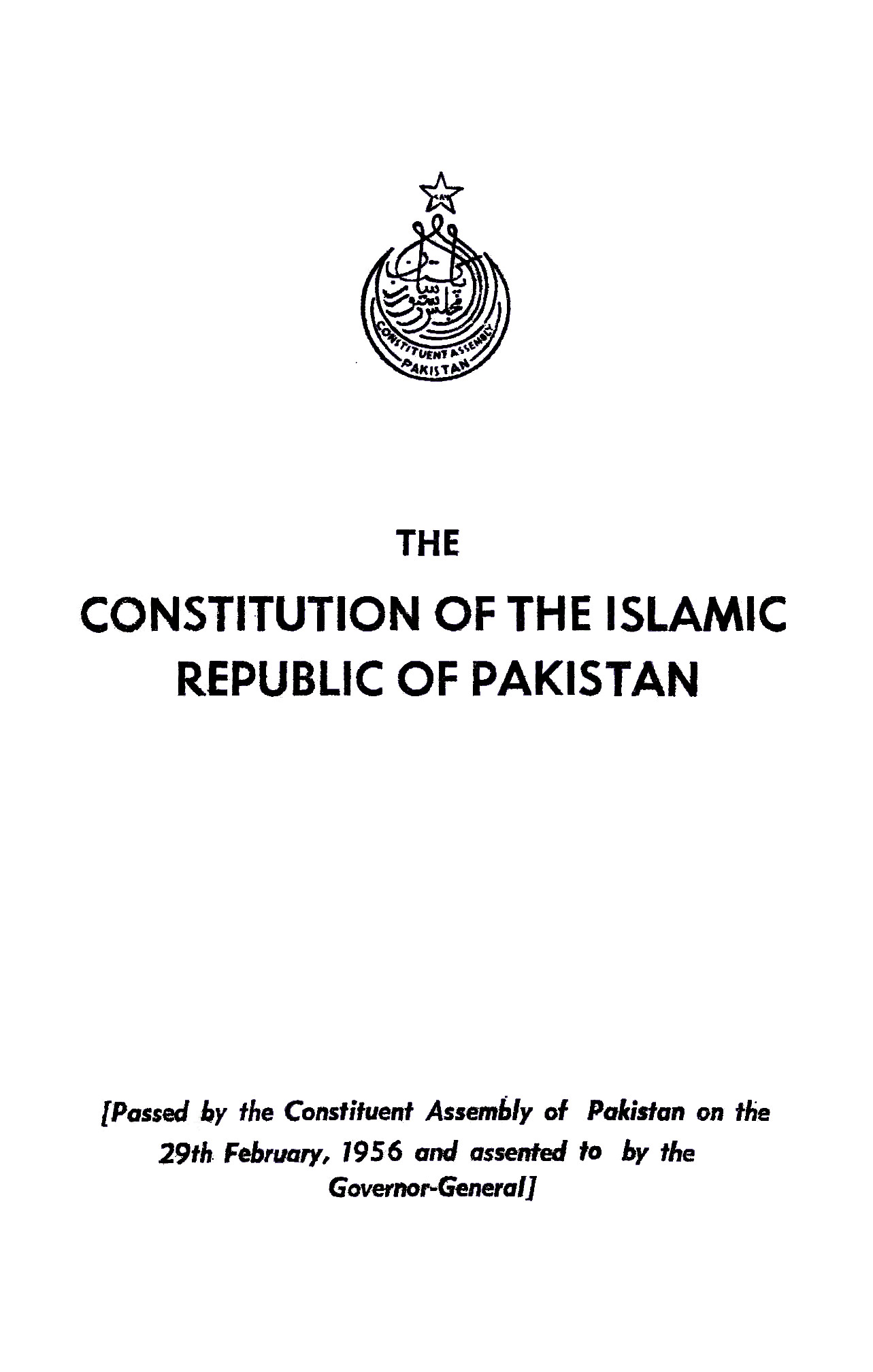
1956 Constitution

In the election, political parties failed to secure a majority to form the central government. After the election, Mohammad Ali Bogra expressed interest in forming a coalition with the UF. However, the PML rejected the conditions set by the UF, leading to the failure of the coalition efforts. Meanwhile, the AL initially agreed to form a coalition government on the condition that Huseyn Shaheed Suhrawardy should be made prime minister. In July 1955, the AL and the UF made a pact (Note: known as Murree Pact.) in the hill town of Murree, West Punjab, to support the PML on the conditions that political leaders from East Bengal be included in the central cabinet and that governor's rule be withdrawn from the province.

The Constituent Assembly session began on 7 July 1955 in Murree. With the support of the PNC, East Bengal SCF, and the UPP, the UF gained a total of 25 supporters in the Assembly.

On 7 August 1955, after Chaudhri Muhammad Ali was elected the PML parliamentary leader in the Constituent Assembly, Mohammad Ali Bogra resigned from the post of prime minister. At that time, an attempt was made to form a tripartite coalition government, and the AL made no immediate objections (Note: However, East Pakistan provincial AL general secretary Sheikh Mujibur Rahman, on the behalf of his party, announced three conditions for the coalition — Suhrawardy should be the prime minister, Regional autonomy for East Bengal and joint electorate, and Bengali should be made Pakistan's state language with Urdu.) but later rejected the proposal. As a result, in 11 August, a coalition cabinet was formed under the leadership of Chaudhri Muhammad Ali, consisting of members from the PML and the UF – the country's first coalition cabinet. In the assembly, Suhrawardy became the opposition leader. On 5 March 1956, Iskander Mirza was elected in an indirect election as interim president of Pakistan, previously serving as governor-general of the country. On 23 March 1956, Pakistan's first constitution was enforced and the British dominion became an Islamic Republic. Mirza's presidency began that same day. After that, the federal government refrained from holding general elections and, with the aid of the administration, maintained a façade of democracy until 1958. Subsequently, martial law was imposed by Mirza, and both the government and parliament were dissolved.

=== List of cabinet members ===
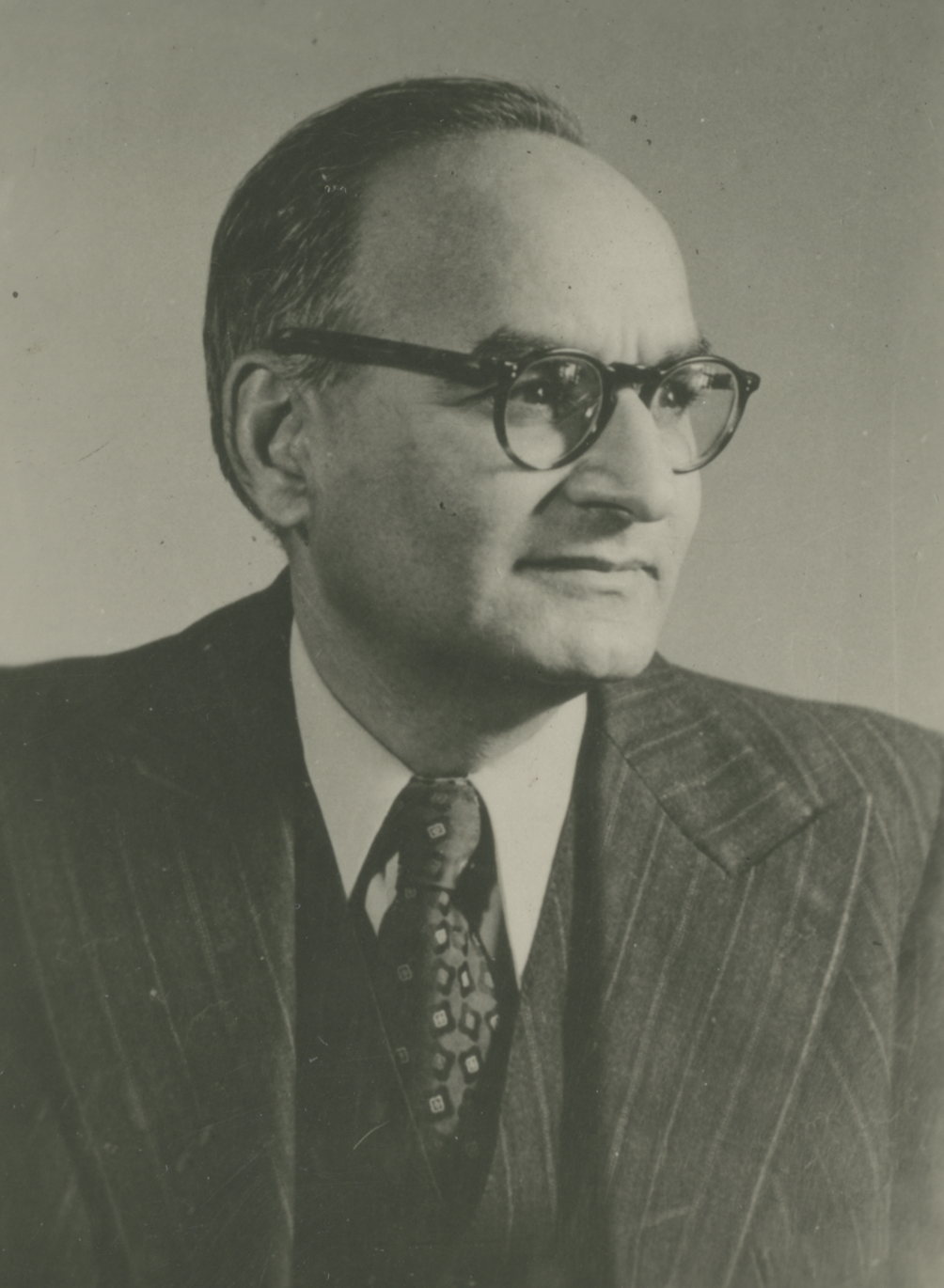
Chaudhri Muhammad Ali, prime minister of the coalition government.

The initial formation of the cabinet established on 11 August 1955 is given below:

Portfolio	Minister	Took office	Left office	Party
Ministry of Foreign Affairs, Commonwealth, Finance, Defence and Economic Affairs	Chaudhri Muhammad Ali	11 August 1955	12 September 1956	PML
Ministry of Communications and Frontier Regions	Khan Abdul Jabbar Khan	11 August 1955	14 October 1955	PML
Ministry of Home Affairs	A. K. Fazlul Huq	11 August 1955	9 March 1956	UF
Ministry of Industries and Commerce	Habib Ibrahim Rahimtoola	11 August 1955	12 September 1956	Independent
Ministry of Education and Kashmir Affairs	Syed Abid Hussain Shah	11 August 1955	14 October 1955	PML
Ministry of Health and Law	Kamini Kumar Dutta	11 August 1955	12 September 1956	UPP
Ministry of Labour, Works and Minority Affairs	Nurul Huq Choudhury	11 August 1955	12 September 1956	UF
Ministry of Information and Broadcasting	Ali Muhammad Rashidi	11 August 1955	29 August 1956	PML
Ministry of Food and Agriculture	Abdul Latif Biswas	11 August 1955	12 September 1956	UF
Finance Division	Lutfur Rahman Khan	11 August 1955	12 September 1956	UF
Refugees, Rehabilitation and Parliamentary Affairs Division	Sardar Amir Azam Khan	11 August 1955	12 September 1956	PML
