= Constituent Assembly of Pakistan =

Former federal legislature of Pakistan (1947–1956)

- Seal of the Constituent Assembly

Type
- Type: Unicameral house

History
- Founded: 10 August 1947
- Disbanded: 23 March 1956
- Preceded by: Constituent Assembly of India
- Succeeded by: Parliament of Pakistan

Leadership
- President: Abdul Wahab Khan, UF
- Leader of the House: Chaudhri Muhammad Ali, ML
- Leader of the Opposition: Huseyn Suhrawardy, AL

Structure
- Seats: 72
- Political groups: Government (50): ML (25); UF (25); Opposition (12): AIML (12); Others (10): PML(N) (3); Independent (7)

Elections
- First election: July 1947
- Last election: 21 June 1955

Meeting place
- Sindh Assembly building, Karachi

The Constituent Assembly of Pakistan (Note: The Constituent Assembly officially used its Persian name, alongside the English name. The names in all languages were: Persian: پاکستان مجلس دستورن, romanized: pākistān majlis dastūran Bengali: পাকিস্তান গণপরিষদ, romanized: pākistān goṇoporishod Urdu: آئین ساز اسمبلی پاکستان, romanized: ā'īn-sāz asimblī pākistān Punjabi: پاکستان دا آئین ساز مجلس, romanized: pākastān dā ā'īn-sāz majlas Sindhi: پاڪستان جي آئين ساز اسيمبلي, romanized: pākistān jī ā'īn-sāz assēmblī Pashto: د پاکستان اساسي قانون جوړونکې جرګه, romanized: dá pākistān asāsī qānūn joṛonkī jirgāh Balochi: پاکستان ءِ آئین ساز اسمبلی, romanized: pákastán ay áén sáz ásambali) was the supreme federal legislature of the Dominion of Pakistan. It was established in August 1947 with the primary tasks of framing a constitution; and serving as an interim parliament. It was officially dissolved on 23 March 1956 and succeeded by the Parliament of Pakistan when the first Pakistani constitution was promulgated.

== History ==
The first Constituent Assembly convened on August 10, 1947, on the eve of independence and the end of British rule. Muhammad Ali Jinnah was elected as the president of the Constituent Assembly of Pakistan on the same day and remained its president until his death on September 11, 1948. Subsequently, Liaquat Ali Khan headed it for three years and produced the Objectives Resolution, which was adopted by the Constituent Assembly on March 12, 1949, as an annex to Pakistan's constitution. It is important to mention that 21 members out of 69 voted for the Objectives Resolution. The assembly had a majority of Muslim League members, with the Pakistan National Congress, the successor to the INC in the state, forming the second largest party, solely representing Hindus.

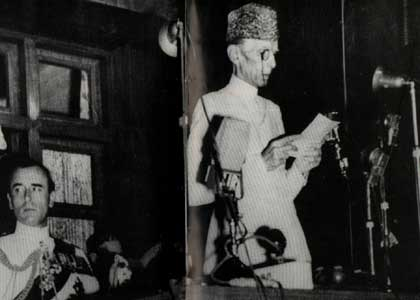
Quaid-e-Azam replying to the Address by Lord Mountbatten in Constituent Assembly on 14 August 1947.

The assembly was widely criticised for its incompetence. Addressing a rally in Lahore on October 14, 1950, Syed Abul Ala Maududi, leader of the Jamaat e Islami demanded its dissolution, arguing that the "lampost legislators" were incapable of drawing up an Islamic constitution. Huseyn Shaheed Suhrawardy said that assembly did not possess any of the characteristics of a democratic parliament. He argued that the nation would overlook any unconstitutional action on the governor general's part if he exorcised the fascist demon and established representative institutions. The Constituent Assembly of Pakistan was dissolved on October 24, 1954, by Governor General Malik Ghulam Muhammad. The dissolution was challenged by the president of the assembly in the notable case of Federation of Pakistan v. Maulvi Tamizuddin Khan, in which the federal court took the side of the governor general, in spite of dissent from one judge. Mohammad Ali Bogra was the Prime Minister of Pakistan at the time.

The Muslim League continued to be the largest party in the second assembly, whereas the Krishak Sramik Party led United Front replaced the Pakistan National Congress as the main opposition group. The constitution was promulgated on March 23, 1956, making Pakistan an Islamic republic. On October 7, 1958, martial law was imposed on the country by Iskander Mirza, with army chief Ayub Khan appointed as the chief martial law administrator. The new leaders abrogated the constitution, declaring it unworkable.

== Members ==
=== First Assembly ===
The members were originally elected to the Constituent Assembly of India before they abdicated in the aftermath of the partition of India. Later the members were elected in 1947 elections. The members were as follows:

Province	Members
East Bengal	Abdullah al Mahmood, Maulana Mohammad Abdullah el Baqui, Abdul Hamid, Abul Kashem Khan, Mohammad Akram Khan, Azizuddin Ahmad, Muhammad Habibullah Bahar, Prem Hari Barma, Raj Kumar Chakraverty, Sris Chandra Chattopadhyaya, Abdul Matin Chaudhary, Murtaza Raza Choudhry, Hamidul Haq Chowdhury, Akhay Kumar Das, Dhirendra Nath Datta, Bhupendra Kumar Datta, Ebrahim Khan, A. K. Fazlul Huq, Fazlur Rahman, Ghayasuddin Pathan, Begum Shaista Suhrawardy Ikramullah, Liaquat Ali Khan, Mafizuddin Ahmad, Mahmud Hussain, Jnanendra Chandra Majumdar, A. M. Malik, Birat Chandra Mandal, Jogendra Nath Mandal, Mohammad Ali Bogra, Khwaja Nazimuddin, Nur Ahmed, Nurul Amin, Ishtiaq Hussain Qureshi, Dhananjoy Roy, Maudi Bhakesh Chanda, Serajul Islam, Maulana Shabbir Ahmad Osmani, Khwaja Shahabuddin, Huseyn Shaheed Suhrawardy, Harendra Kumar Sur, Tamizuddin Khan, Kamini Kumar Dutta, Malik Ghulam Muhammad
West Punjab	Mumtaz Daultana, Ganga Saran, Bhim Sen Sachar, Zafarullah Khan, Iftikhar Hussain Khan, Mian Muhammad Iftikharuddin, Muhammad Ali Jinnah, Sheikh Karamat Ali, Nazir Ahmad Khan, Sardar Abdur Rab Nistar, Feroz Khan Noon, Omar Hayat Malik, Shah Nawaz Begum Jahan Ara, Sardar Shaukat Hyat Khan
Northwest Frontier Province	Khan Abdul Ghaffar Khan, Sardar Bahadur Khan, Sardar Asad Ullah Jan Khan
Sindh	Abdus Sattar Abdur Rahman, Muhammad Hashim Gazdar, Muhammad Ayoob Khuhro
Balochistan	Nawab Mohammad Khan Jogezai

=== Second Assembly ===
The second Constituent Assembly was elected in the Second Constituent Assembly election on June 21, 1955.

The members of the 2nd constituent assembly were

Province	Members
East Bengal	Abdul Aleem, Abdul Karim, Muhammad Abdul Khaleque, Abdul Wahab Khan, Abdul Rahman Khan, Abdus Sattar, Abdul Mansur Ahmad, Adeluddin Ahmad, Ataur Rahman Khan, Athar Ali, Gour Chandra Bala, Canteswar Barman, Abdul Latif Biswas, Hamidul Huq Choudhury, Nurul Huq Choudhury, Yusuf Ali Chowdhury, Akshay Kumar Das, Basanta Kumar Das, A.H. Deldar Ahmed, Bhupendra Kumar Datta, Kamini Kumar Dutta, Farid Ahmad, A. K. Fazlul Huq, Sardar Fazlul Karim, Fazlur Rahman, Peter Paul Gomez, Lutfur Rahman Khan, Mahfuzul Huq, Mahmud Ali, Rasa Raj Mandal, Misbahuddin Hussain, Mohammad Ali Bogra, Moslem Ali Molla, Sheikh Mujibur Rahman, Muzaffar Ahmed, Nurur Rahman, Sailendra Kumar Sen, Hussain Shaheed Suhrawardy, Abdur Rashid Tarkabagish, Sheikh Zahiruddin
West Punjab	Mian Abdul Bari Arain, Abdul Hamid Khan Soofi, Syed Abid Hussain Shah, Syed Amjad Ali, Sardar Amir Azam Khan, Malik Amir Mohammad Khan, Chaudhuri Aziz Din, Chaudhury Muhammad Hussain Chatha, I.I. Chundrigar, Chaudhury Abdul Hamid Khan Dasti, Mian Mumtaz Muhammad Khan Daultana, Chaudhury Abdul Ghani Ghuman, Cecil Edward Gibbon, Mushtaq Ahmad Gurmani, Syed Alamdar Hussain Shah Gilani, Iftikhar Hussain Khan, Mozaffar Ali Khan Qizilbash, Mian Iftikharuddin, Mir Balak Sher Mazari, Syed Mohyuddin Lal Badshah, Malik Feroz Khan Noon
Bahawalpur state	Ahmad Nawaz Shah Gardezi, Mian Abdus Salam
North West Frontier Province	Sardar Abdur Rashid Khan, Mian Jaffer Shah, Khan Mohammad Jalaluddin Khan, M. R. Kayani
Frontier States	Miangul Jahan Zeb
Federally Administered Tribal Areas	Malik Jehangir Khan Madda Khel Wazir, Malik Waris Khan Mardinkhel Afridi, Khan Bahadur Haji Malik Mehrdil Khan Muhsud
Sindh	Ali Muhammad Rashidi, Haji Moula Baksh Soomro, M.A. Khuhro, Siroomal Kirpaldas, Mir Ghulam Ali Khan Talpur
Khairpur (princely state)	Mumtaz Hasan Kizilbash
Balochistan	Khan Abdul Jabbar Khan
Baluchistan States Union	Nawab Mir Baian Khan Gichki
Federal Capital Territory	Yusuf Haroon

== See also ==
- Constituent assembly
