= Noon government =

8th Cabinet of Pakistan, 1957–1958

Central Government of Firoz Khan Noon
- 8th Cabinet of Pakistan
- 1957–1958
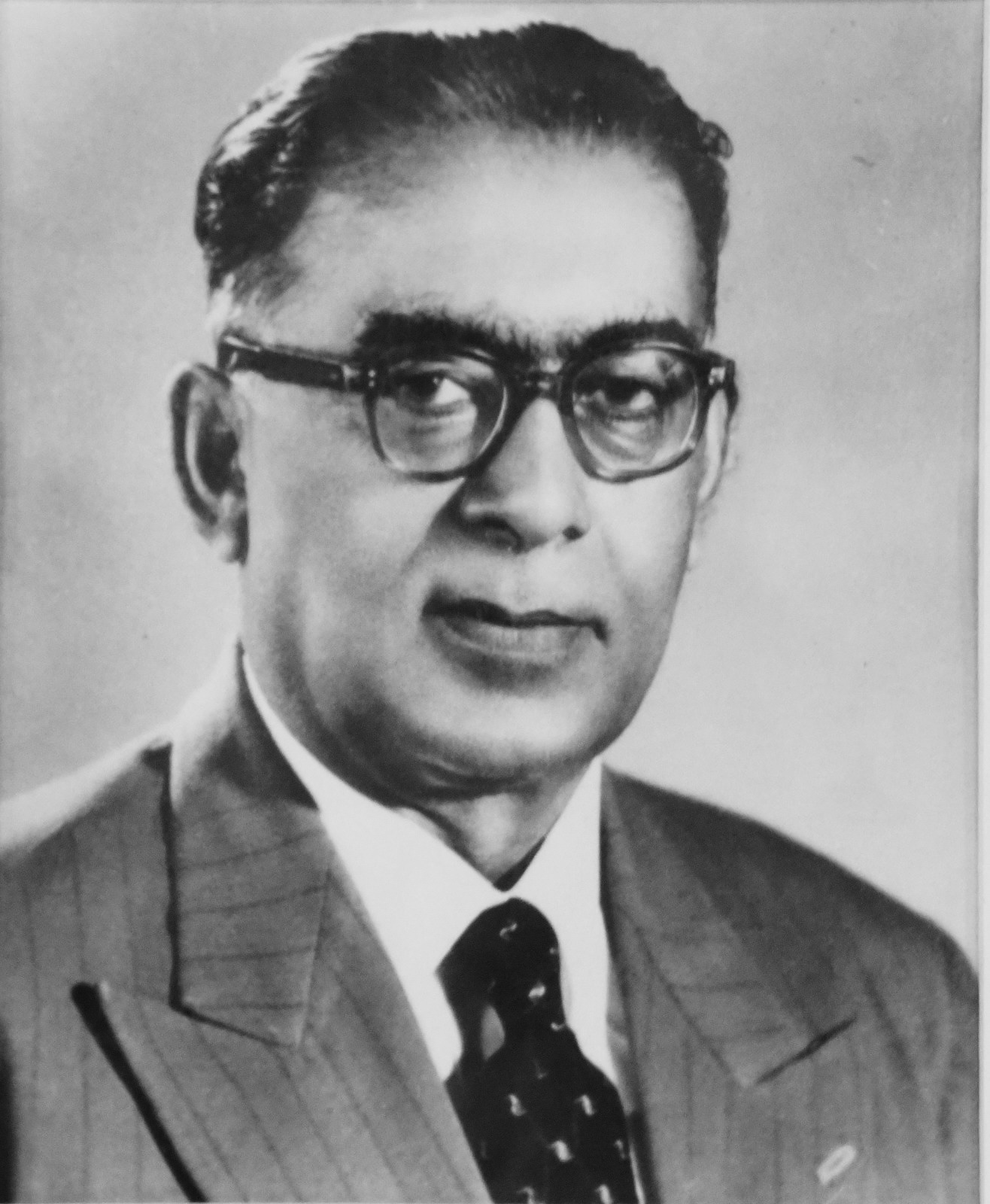
- Date formed: 16 December 1957
- Date dissolved: 7 October 1958

People and organisations
- Head of state: Iskander Mirza
- Head of government: Feroz Khan Noon
- Member party: Republican Party Coalition members: Awami League; Krishak Sramik Party National Awami Party
- Opposition party: Muslim League
- Opposition leader: Ibrahim Ismail Chundrigar

History
- Election: 1955 Pakistani Constituent Assembly election
- Outgoing election: 1947 Pakistani Constituent Assembly election
- Legislature terms: 2nd Constituent Assembly of Pakistan
- Predecessor: Chundrigar government
- Successor: Ayub Khan military government

The Noon government, also known as Noon administration, was the eighth government and cabinet of Pakistan formed by Firoz Khan Noon on 16 December 1957 after the resignation of the previous prime minister, Ibrahim Ismail Chundrigar. He was asked to form the government on 13 December 1957 by Iskander Mirza. His government was supported by Awami League, led by Huseyn Suhrawardy. The coalition was formed on the basis of agreement to introduce a single voting list for all citizens and to hold general elections by November 1958. It consisted of members from multiple parties, including the Republican Party, the Awami League, Hindu parties, the National Awami Party, the Peasants and Workers Party, and independents. On 7 October 1958, his government was dismissed by Iskander Mirza, when he imposed the martial law in Pakistan.

On 3 January 1958, during debate on a government bill proposing a ban on strikes by employees in essential services, Abdul Khaleque of the Awami League publicly opposed the measure, breaking party discipline and calling for the bill's withdrawal. The Awami League parliamentary members had earlier agreed in a closed session to support the bill. However, Khaleque and several senior Awami League members left the chamber before the vote. The bill was ultimately passed by the Assembly.

== Cabinet ==
=== Federal ministers ===
Minister	Portfolio	Period
Malik Firoz Khan Noon	1. Foreign Affairs & Commonwealth Relations; 2. States & Frontier Regions; 3. Defence; 4. Economic Affairs; 5. Rehabilitation; 6. Information & Broadcasting; 7. Kashmir Affairs; 8. Law; 9. Parliamentary Affairs	16 December 1957 to 7 October 1958; 16 December 1957 to 7 October 1958; 16 December 1957 to 8 April 1958; 16 December 1957 to 29 March 1958; 16 December 1957 to 22 January 1958; 16 December 1957 to 21 January 1958; 16 December 1957 to 7 October 1958; 16 December 1957 to 21 January 1958; 16 December 1957 to 27 December 1957
Syed Amjad Ali	Finance	16 December 1957 to 7 October 1958
Muzaffar Ali Khan Qizilbash	1. Industries; 2. Commerce; 3. Parliamentary Affairs	16 December 1957 to 18 March 1958; 27 December 1957 to 18 March 1958; 16 December 1957 to 27 December 1957
Mir Ghulam Ali Talpur	1. Interior; 2. Supply	16 December 1957 to 18 March 1958; 10 April 1958 to 7 October 1958
Mian Jaffer Shah	1. Food; 2. Agriculture	16 December 1957 to 7 October 1958
Abdul Aleem	1. Works; 2. Labour; 3. Minority Affairs; 4. Information & Broadcasting	16 December 1957 to 7 October 1958; 16 December 1957 to 7 February 1958; 16 December 1957 to 7 October 1958; 21 January 1958 to 7 October 1958
Ramizuddin Ahmed	Communications	16 December 1957 to 7 October 1958
Kamini Kumar Dutta	1. Health; 2. Education; 3. Law	16 December 1957 to 24 January 1958; 16 December 1957 to 7 February 1958; 21 January 1958 to 7 October 1958
Haji Moulabuksh Soomro	Rehabilitation	22 January 1958 to 7 October 1958
Mahfuzul Haq	1. Health; 2. Social Welfare & Community Development	24 January 1958 to 7 October 1958; 9 April 1958 to 7 October 1958
Basanta Kumar Das	1. Labour; 2. Education	7 February 1958 to 7 October 1958; 7 February 1958 to 7 October 1958
Sardar Abdur Rashid	1. Commerce; 2. Industries	29 March 1958 to 7 October 1958
Sardar Amir Azam Khan	1. Economic Affairs; 2. Parliamentary Affairs	29 March 1958 to 7 October 1958
Muhammad Ayub Khuhro	Defence	8 April 1958 to 7 October 1958
Hamidul Huq Chowdhury	Finance	16 September 1958 to 7 October 1958
Sahiruddin	—	2 October 1958 to 7 October 1958
A. H. Dildar Ahmad	—	2 October 1958 to 7 October 1958
Nurur Rahman	—	2 October 1958 to 7 October 1958

=== Ministers of State ===
Minister	Portfolio	Period
Haji Moulabuksh Soomro	1. Defence; 2. Economic Affairs; 3. Rehabilitation; 4. Information & Broadcasting; 5. Kashmir Affairs; 6. Law; 7. Parliamentary Affairs	16 December 1957 to 22 January 1958
Akshay Kumar Das	Finance	16 December 1957 to 7 October 1958
Khan Mohammad Jalaluddin Khan	1. Interior; 2. Finance	5 April 1958 to 20 September 1958; 20 September 1958 to 7 October 1958
Syed Ahmed Nawaz Shah Gardezi	1. Food; 2. Agriculture	5 April 1958 to 7 October 1958
Akbar Bugti	Interior	20 September 1958 to 7 October 1958
Mian Abdus Salam	Information & Broadcasting	20 September 1958 to 7 October 1958
Abdur Rahman Khan	—	2 October 1958 to 7 October 1958
Peter Paul Gomez	—	2 October 1958 to 7 October 1958
Adeluddin Ahmad	—	2 October 1958 to 7 October 1958
Syed Alamdar Hussain Shah Gilani	—	2 October 1958 to 7 October 1958
