= Chaudhri Muhammad Ali government =

4th Cabinet of Pakistan, 1955–1956

Central Government of Chaudhri Muhammad Ali
- 4th Cabinet of Pakistan
- 1955–1956
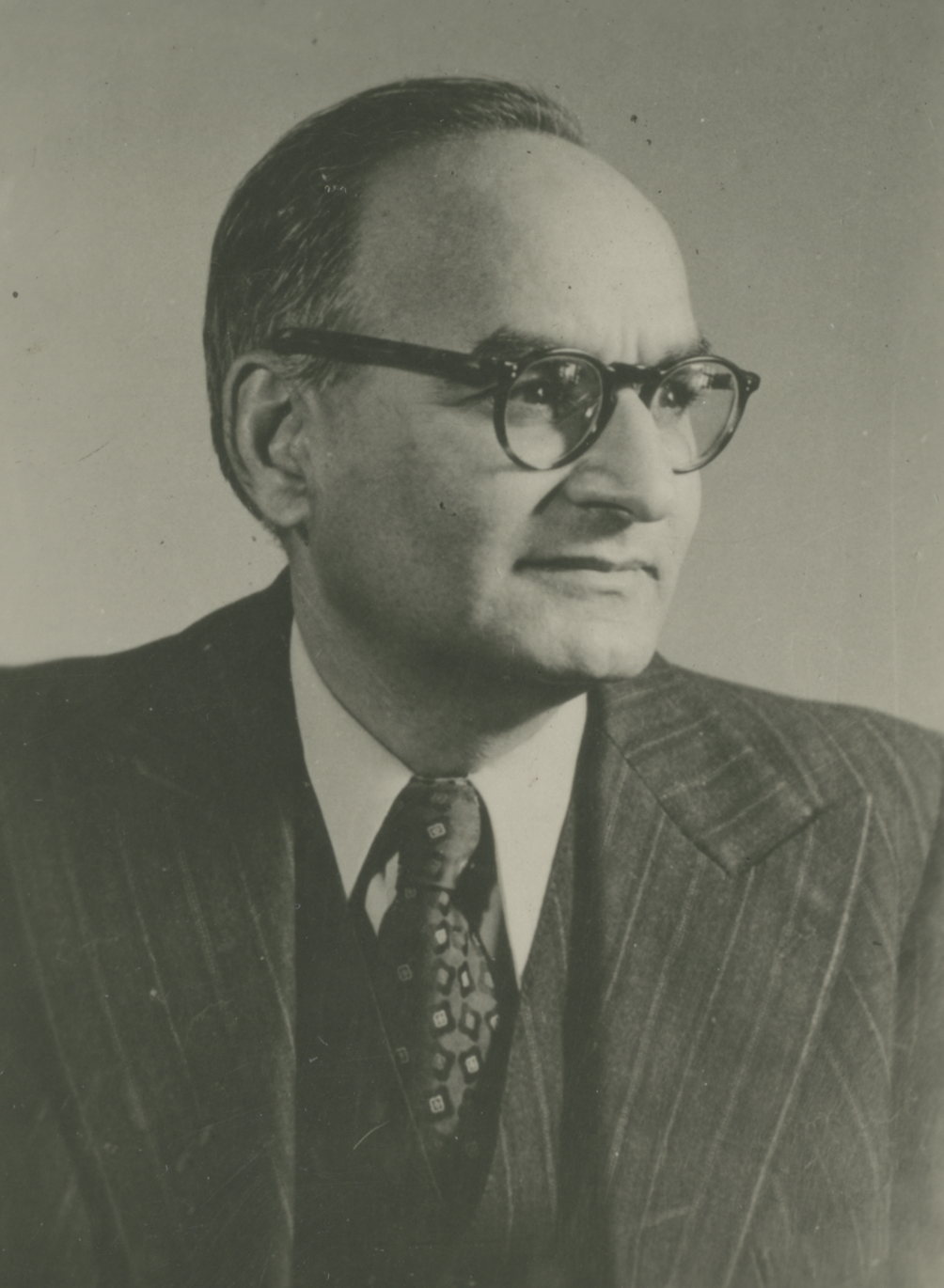
- Date formed: 11 August 1955
- Date dissolved: 12 September 1956

People and organisations
- Head of state: Iskander Mirza
- Head of government: Chaudhri Muhammad Ali
- Member party: Muslim League
- Opposition party: Awami League
- Opposition leader: Huseyn Shaheed Suhrawardy

History
- Election: 1955 Pakistani Constituent Assembly election
- Outgoing election: 1947 Pakistani Constituent Assembly election
- Legislature terms: 2nd Constituent Assembly of Pakistan
- Predecessor: Bogra government
- Successor: Suhrawardy government

The Mohammad Ali administration was the fourth government and cabinet of Pakistan formed by Chaudhri Muhammad Ali on 11 August 1955.

== Cabinet ==
=== Federal ministers (11 August 1955 – 12 September 1956) ===
Minister	Portfolio	Period
Chaudhry Muhammad Ali	1. Defence; 2. Foreign Affairs & Commonwealth Relations; 3. Finance; 4. Economic Affairs; 5. Kashmir Affairs; 6. States & Frontier Regions	11 Aug 1955 – 12 Sep 1956; 11 Aug 1955 – 26 Sep 1955; 11 Aug 1955 – 17 Oct 1955; 11 Aug 1955 – 15 Mar 1956; 17 Oct 1955 – 12 Sep 1956; 17 Oct 1955 – 12 Sep 1956
Khan Sahib	1. Communications; 2. States & Frontier Regions	11 Aug 1955 – 14 Oct 1955
A. K. Fazlul Huq	1. Interior; 2. Education	11 Aug 1955 – 9 Mar 1956; 17 Oct 1955 – 9 Mar 1956
Habib Ibrahim Rahimtoola	1. Commerce; 2. Industries	11 Aug 1955 – 12 Sep 1956
Syed Abid Hussain Shah	1. Kashmir Affairs; 2. Education	11 Aug 1955 – 14 Oct 1955
Kamini Kumar Dutta	1. Law; 2. Health	11 Aug 1955 – 31 Aug 1955; 11 Aug 1955 – 12 Sep 1956
Ali Muhammad Rashidi	Information & Broadcasting	11 Aug 1955 – 29 Aug 1956
Nurul Huq Choudhury	1. Labour; 2. Works; 3. Minority Affairs	11 Aug 1955 – 12 Sep 1956
Abdul Latif Biswas	1. Food; 2. Agriculture	11 Aug 1955 – 12 Sep 1956
Ibrahim Ismail Chundrigar	Law	31 Aug 1955 – 29 Aug 1956
Hamidul Huq Choudhury	Foreign Affairs & Commonwealth Relations	26 Sep 1955 – 12 Sep 1956
Syed Amjad Ali	1. Finance; 2. Economic Affairs	17 Oct 1955 – 12 Sep 1956; 15 Mar 1956 – 12 Sep 1956
Malikur Rehman Kayani	Communications	17 Oct 1955 – 12 Sep 1956
Abdus Sattar	1. Interior; 2. Education	17 Mar 1956 – 12 Sep 1956

=== Ministers of State ===
Minister	Portfolio	Period
Sardar Amir Azam Khan	1. Refugees & Rehabilitation; 2. Parliamentary Affairs	11 Aug 1955 – 12 Sep 1956
Lutfur Rahman Khan	Finance	11 Aug 1955 – 12 Sep 1956
Akshay Kumar Das	Economic Affairs	26 Sep 1955 – 12 Sep 1956
