= 1956 Pakistani presidential election =

- 5 March 1956

80 members of Constituent Assembly 41 votes needed to win
- Turnout: 50 (62.5%)
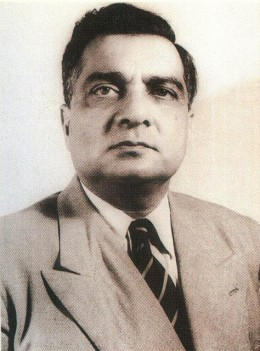
Nominee	Iskander Mirza
Party	PML
Electoral vote	50
Percentage	62.5%
Governor-General before election
Iskander Mirza
PML
Interim President after election
Iskander Mirza
PML

Pakistan's election for its interim president was held on 5 March 1956. The election was conducted indirectly through the votes of members of the Constituent Assembly of Pakistan. In the election, Iskander Mirza, a member of the Pakistan Muslim League (PML), was elected.

== Background ==
After the independence in 1947, the British monarch became the head of state of the newly formed Dominion of Pakistan, which emerged from the dissolved British colony of British India. Their appointed Governor-General acted as the executive authority and representative of the Crown in Pakistan. The Constituent Assembly of Pakistan was formed based on the results of the first Constituent Assembly election. On 9 January 1956, a draft of the constitution was presented in the Constituent Assembly, and it was adopted on 29 February 1956. On 1 March 1956, a notice was sent to the secretariat of the Constituent Assembly by law minister I. I. Chundrigar, proposing the date of 5 March 1956 for the presidential election. On 2 March 1956, the Assembly decided that 23 March—the day the constitution would come into effect—would henceforth be celebrated annually as Republic Day, and that the interim president would take the oath of office on the same day.

== Nomination and results ==
On 4 March 1956, the PML–UF coalition party submitted nomination papers for Iskander Mirza, the governor-general of the country, for the presidential election. Major-General Mirza, former interior minister, joined the Pakistan Muslim League (PML) on 4 June 1955 and was elected from West Punjab in the Second Constituent Assembly election. On the other hand, the opposition did not nominate any candidate. As the deadline for nomination passed, Abdul Wahab Khan, the speaker of the Constituent Assembly, announced that the election would be held the next day. On 5 March 1956, the nominee was declared interim president of Pakistan with the support of 50 out of 80 members of the Constituent Assembly. Members of the All-Pakistan Awami League (AL) and the Pakistan National Congress (PNC) were not present during the election.

== Aftermath ==
On 23 March 1956, Pakistan's first constitution came into effect and Mirza assumed office as interim president. After the constitution was implemented, the federal government refrained from holding general elections and ruled Pakistan with the help of the administration under a façade of democracy for two years. The new PML—AL—RP coalition party had been negotiating their own president to replace Mirza in 1958. Then, on 7 October 1958, Mirza imposed martial law, dissolved the central cabinet and parliament. Twenty days after the imposition of military rule, Mirza resigned and handed over power to Ayub Khan, chief martial law administrator of the country. Thereafter, a military government was established in Pakistan under Khan's leadership. In a referendum held in 1960, Khan was elected president for a term of five years.
