= Jalal Baba Auditorium =

Public auditorium in Abbottabad

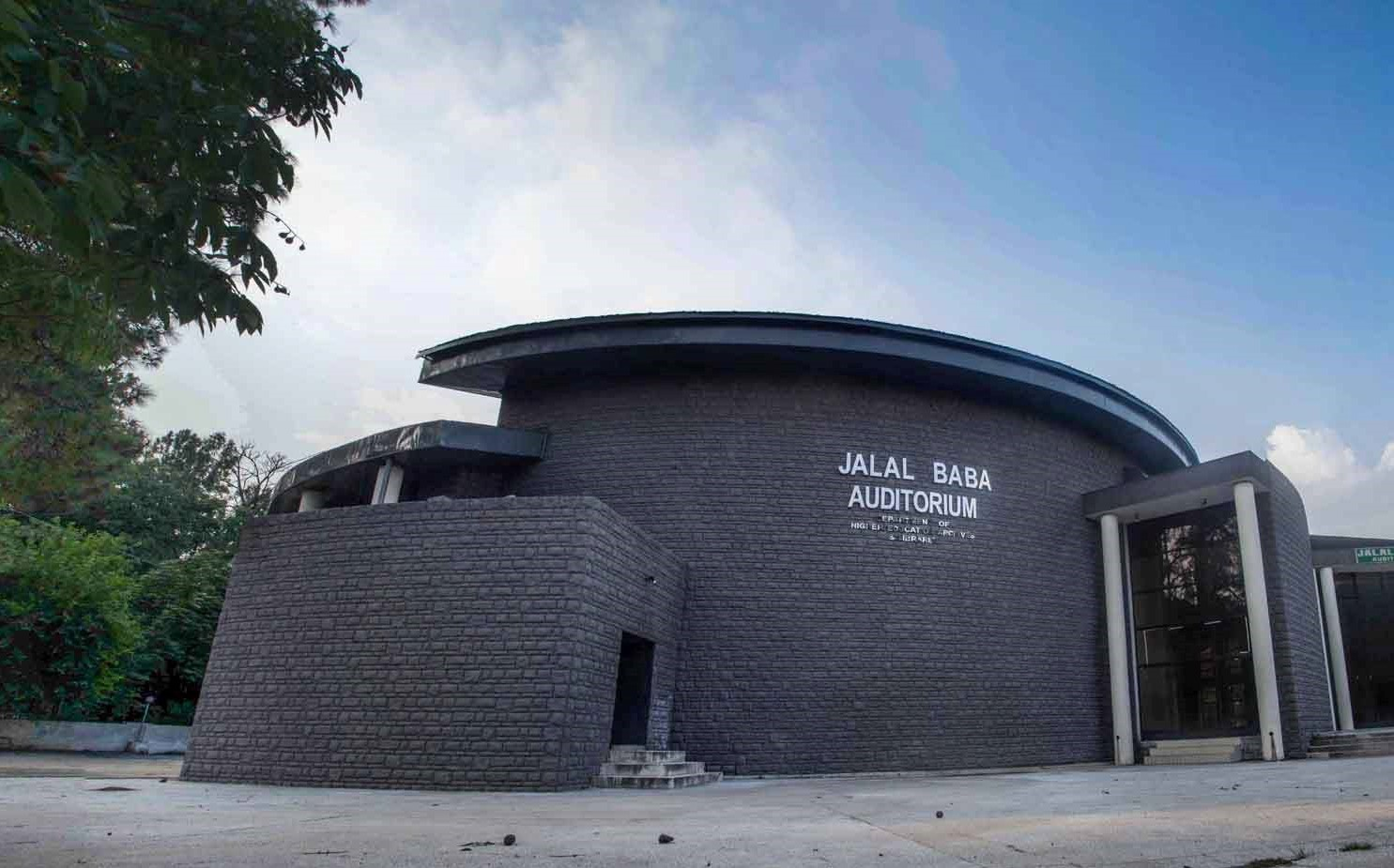
- Jalal Baba Auditorium, Abbottabad
- Interactive map of Jalal Baba Auditorium
- Location: Abbottabad
- Coordinates: 34°09′01″N 73°12′39″E
- Seating type: Large hall performers' waiting room VIP rooms
- Capacity: 500-700
- Type: Auditorium
- Events: Music, concerts, lectures, commencements, and Covid-19 vaccination center

Construction
- Built: 1993

Jalal Baba Auditorium is a public auditorium in Abbottabad, Khyber Pakhtunkhwa, Pakistan.

== History ==
The auditorium was named after Khan Jalaluddin Khan Jalal Baba. Khan was a respected leader of All India Muslim League and minister from Abbottabad at the time of the Partition of India in 1947. It was constructed in 1993, and consists of a large hall, performers' waiting room, and VIP rooms. It has the capacity to seat between 500 and 700 people.

The auditorium has held exhibitions, concert events, public meetings, conferences and numerous other activities. It is also used for a Karate club. It also houses a National Book Foundation (Pakistan) centre, Abbasin Arts Council and Abbottabad Development Authority offices.
