= The Bangladesh Observer =

Former English-language newspaper in Bangladesh

- Founder: Hamidul Huq Choudhury
- Founded: 1949
- Ceased publication: June 8, 2010

The Bangladesh Observer, founded by Hamidul Huq Choudhury in 1949, was the oldest continuously published English-language daily newspaper in Bangladesh until it ceased publication in June 2010.

== History ==
Since its inception as The Pakistan Observer in 1949, the newspaper consistently followed an independent editorial policy, reflecting both the personality of its owner Hamidul Huq Choudhury and its long time editor Abdus Salam, and was an appropriate stance considering the tumultuous history of the region. Mohammad Shehabullah served as the newspaper's first editor. Shehabullah was succeeded by Abdus Salam, who served as editor of The Pakistan Observer from 1949 to 1972.

The East Pakistan provincial government imposed an embargo on the newspaper's publication under the repressive Public Safety Act in February 1952. This was in response to the newspaper's strong support for the East Pakistan language movement and demands for provincial autonomy. Both Hamidul Huq Choudhury and Abdus Salam were arrested at this time to stifle the voice of the press. The United Front government withdrew the embargo in May 1954 following the coalitions landslide electoral victory. In the early 1960s, the paper was black-listed and deprived of government advertising by the military government of General Ayub Khan due to its support for greater autonomy for East Pakistan.

Immediately after the creation of Bangladesh, The Pakistan Observer was renamed The Bangladesh Observer in December 1971. Its management was taken over by the Bangladesh government in January 1972. The military government of General Hussain Mohammed Ershad restored the newspaper to its original owner Hamidul Huq Choudhury in January 1984. On June 8, 2010, The Bangladesh Observer announced that it had ceased publication.

== See also ==
- List of newspapers in Bangladesh
- Hamidul Huq Choudhury
