= Abdur Rahman Khan (politician) =

Bangladeshi lawyer and politician (1906–date of death unknown)

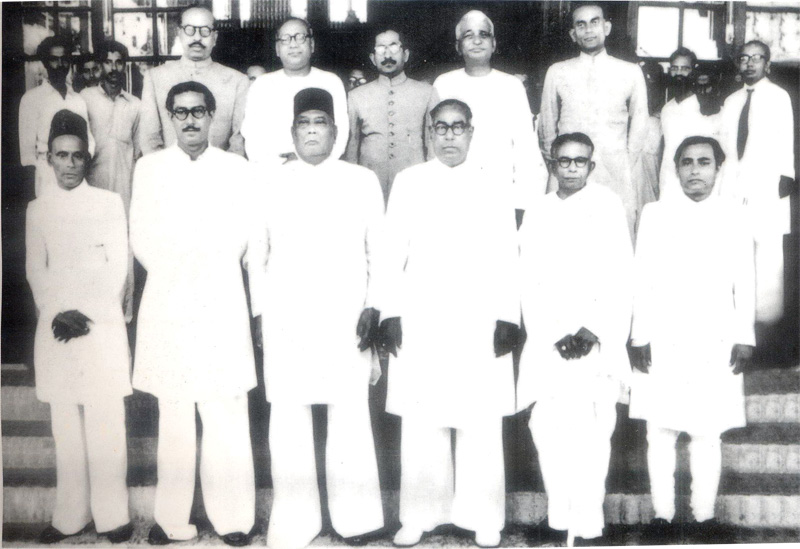
Abdur Rahman Khan (far left, back row)

Abdur Rahman Khan (1906 – date of death unknown) was a Bangladeshi lawyer and politician who served as a provincial minister of East Pakistan. He was elected to the East Bengal Legislative Assembly in 1954 and to the Constituent Assembly of Pakistan in 1955, and later became a member of the National Assembly of Pakistan. He was an early member of the East Pakistan Awami League and a participant in the Bengali Language Movement.

== Early life ==
Khan was born in 1906 in Brahmanbaria Subdivision, Tipperah District, Eastern Bengal and Assam, British India, in the area now comprising Brahmanbaria District, Bangladesh.

== Career ==
In 1940, Khan became assistant secretary of the All-Bengal and Assam Lawyers' Association. In 1946, he was appointed as an assistant public prosecutor and became a member of the Tipperah District Board.

In 1948, Khan joined the East Pakistan Awami League (AL). He was a supporter of the Bengali Language Movement and was arrested in 1952 for his activism. In the 1954 provincial election, he was nominated as an AL candidate and elected a member of the East Bengal Legislative Assembly. He was arrested again in 1954 during the period of governor's rule.

In the 1955 indirect elections, Khan was elected to the Constituent Assembly of Pakistan from East Bengal as a Muslim candidate and subsequently became a member of the National Assembly of Pakistan. In 1956, as a member of the First Ataur ministry, he was appointed provincial minister of East Pakistan. He subsequently served as president of the Comilla District branch of the AL.

Khan later left the AL and joined the Pakistan Democratic Party (PDP). In the 1970 general election, he stood as a candidate for the constituency of NE-132 Comilla-II but finished as second runner-up. In 1971, Khan opposed the independence of Bangladesh and acted against the Bangladesh Liberation War.
