= Abdul Karim (Bengali politician) =

Pakistani politician

Abdul Karim was a member of the National Assembly of Pakistan representing East Bengal.

== Career ==
Karim born in Tipperah District, Bengal Presidency, British India. He passed intermediate examination from Comilla Victoria College in 1923. After five years, he got his law degree from the University of Calcutta. After that, he started his career as lawyer in Chandpur. He started his political life by joining Indian National Congress (INC). However, in 1937, he joined All-India Muslim League (AIML). After the independence of Pakistan in 1947, he became a member of Pakistan Muslim League (PML), the successor of AIML. In 1953, he left PML. In the 1955 Pakistani Constituent Assembly election, he was elected to the National Assembly of Pakistan from East Pakistan as a candidate of the United Front (UF).
