= Abdul Latif Biswas (Pakistani politician) =

Pakistani lawyer and politician

Federal Minister for Food and Agriculture of Pakistan
- In office 18 October 1957 – 16 December 1957
- Leader: I. I. Chundrigar
- Preceded by: A. H. Deldar Ahmed
- Succeeded by: Mian Jaffer Shah
- In office 11 August 1955 – 12 September 1956
- Leader: Chaudhri Muhammad Ali
- Preceded by: Ghayasuddin Pathan
- Succeeded by: A. H. Deldar Ahmed

Provincial Minister for Revenue and Land Reforms of East Pakistan
- In office 15 May 1954 – 29 May 1954
- Leader: A. K. Fazlul Huq
- Preceded by: Tafazzal Ali
- Succeeded by: Syed Mostagawsal Haque

Personal details
- Born: 1897 Sonakandar, Bengal Presidency, British India
- Died: 15 November 1964 (aged 66–67) Wari, Dacca, East Pakistan
- Party: NDF
- Other political affiliations: KSP (1953–1958); ML (1946–1953); KPP (1941–1946); AIML (1936–1941)
- Relatives: M. K. Anwar (son-in-law)
- Education: University of Calcutta
- Profession: Lawyer

Abdul Latif Biswas (Bengali: আব্দুল লতিফ বিশ্বাস; Urdu: عبد اللطیف بسواس; 1897 – 15 November 1964) was a Pakistani lawyer and politician. He served twice as Federal Minister for Food and Agriculture of Pakistan, under the Chaudhri Muhammad Ali government in 1955 and the Chundrigar government in 1957, and as Provincial Minister of East Pakistan in 1954 as a member of the Third Huq ministry. He was also a member of the Constituent Assembly of Pakistan, and the East Bengal Legislative Assembly and Bengal Legislative Assembly.

== Early life and education ==
Biswas was born in 1897 in Sonakandar, Manikganj subdivision, Dacca District, Bengal Presidency, British India. After graduating from Dacca College in 1919, he studied law at the University of Calcutta in 1922 and subsequently joined the legal profession at the Manikganj Munsif Court.

== Career ==
In 1925, Biswas was elected a member of the Manikganj Local Board, and in 1933 a member of the Dacca District Board. He began his political career in 1936 by joining the Bengal Provincial Muslim League (BPML). In 1937, he contested the Bengal provincial election as a BPML candidate and was elected a member of the Bengal Legislative Assembly. In 1941, he left the BPML and joined the Krishak Praja Party (KPP). In 1946, he left the KPP and rejoined the BPML (later succeeded as East Pakistan Provincial Muslim League or EPPML).

In 1953, Biswas left the EPPML for a second time and, together with A. K. Fazlul Huq, formed the Krishak Sramik Party (KSP), of which he was elected general secretary. In the 1954 provincial election, he was elected a member of the East Bengal Legislative Assembly and was appointed Provincial Minister of East Pakistan as a member of the Third Huq ministry.

In 1955, Biswas was elected to the Constituent Assembly of Pakistan in the second Constituent Assembly election by indirect votes. In the same year, he was appointed Federal Minister for Food and Agriculture as a member of the Chaudhri Muhammad Ali government. In 1957, he was appointed to the same portfolio again as a member of the Chundrigar government.

In 1958, President Iskander Mirza dissolved all political parties, including the KSP. The following year, under the Election Bodies Disqualification Order (EBDO), Biswas lost his eligibility to participate in politics. In 1962, he joined other KSP leaders in opposing the revival of the party. He subsequently joined the National Democratic Front (NDF).

== Personal life ==
Biswas had five sons and three daughters. His wife died in 1963. Bangladeshi politician M. K. Anwar was his son-in-law.

== Death ==
Biswas died of a heart attack on 15 November 1964 at his residence on Rankin Street in Dacca, East Pakistan.
