= Ghari Afghanan =

Village in Punjab, Pakistan

Coordinates: 33.800°N 72.785°E

Garhi Afghanan is a village in Taxila tehsil, Rawalpindi district, Punjab, Pakistan. It is situated beside Wah Cantt, about 33 km northwest of Islamabad. Its area is about 1.4 square kilometres. It has a population of about 11,000.
