= Mian Abdul Bari =

Pakistani politician

- میاں عبدالباری

Member of the Pakistan National Assembly for NW-32 (Lyallpur-I)
- In office 8 June 1962 – 8 June 1965
- President: Ayub Khan
- Succeeded by: Mohammad Saleem Khan
- In office 7 July 1955 – 7 October 1958
- Leader: Chaudhri Muhammad Ali; Huseyn Shaheed Suhrawardy; I. I. Chundrigar; Feroz Khan Noon
- Preceded by: Chaudhry Ali Akbar Khan

Leader of the Opposition in the Provincial Assembly of the Punjab
- In office 9 December 1952 – 14 October 1955
- Chief Minister: Mumtaz Daultana; Feroz Khan Noon; Abdul Hamid Khan Dasti
- Preceded by: Iftikhar Hussain Khan Mamdot
- Succeeded by: Sardar Bahadur Khan

Member of the Punjab Provincial Assembly for Lyallpur-VII (Muslim)
- In office 7 May 1951 – 14 October 1955
- Leader: Iftikhar Hussain Khan Mamdot
- Preceded by: constituency established
- Succeeded by: Amir Habibullah Khan Saadi

Personal details
- Born: 1895 Lyallpur District, Punjab Province, British India
- Died: 28 October 1968 (aged 72–73) Jaranwala Tehsil, West Pakistan, Pakistan
- Party: PMLC
- Other political affiliations: AL (1950–1958); PML (1947–1950); AIML (pre-1947)
- Relations: Mian Moeen Uddin Bari (son), Mian Ghulam Haider Bari (grandson)
- Education: Bachelor of Arts from Government College, Lahore

Mian Abdul Bari (Punjabi: میاں عبدالباری, 1895 – 28 October 1968) was a Pakistani politician. He was from a Punjabi major tribe named Arain.

== Early life and career ==
Mian Abdul Bari was born in 1895 in Lyallpur District, Punjab, British India. Bari, a former resident of Jalandhar, was son of Civil Judge Mian Ghulam Gillani. He acquired Bachelor of Arts from Government College, Lahore in 1913. He joined Silk Letter Movement and was arrested in 1916 by Russian Empire on his way from Kabul to Constantinople on a special mission.

In the 1940s, he was president of Lyallpur district branch of the All-India Muslim League.

In 1949, he became president of Punjab Muslim League after the resignation of Mumtaz Daultana and retained his position till 1950.

Before 1951 Punjab provincial election, he joined Jinnah Awami Muslim League (later renamed All-Pakistan Awami League).

He was also opposition leader in Punjab Provincial Assembly.

As a candidate of All-Pakistan Awami League, he was elected in 1955 Pakistani Constituent Assembly election and became a member of 2nd Constituent Assembly of Pakistan.

In 1962 Pakistani general election, Mian Abdul Bari was elected as National Assembly member from his area, Lyallpur.

Politician Mian Moeen Uddin Bari, bodyguard of Muhammad Ali Jinnah, was his son.
