= Canteswar Barman =

East Pakistan politician

Canteswar Barman was a Member of the 2nd National Assembly of Pakistan as a representative of East Pakistan.

== Career ==
Barman was a Member of the 2nd National Assembly of Pakistan.
