= Syed Abid Hussain Shah =

Pakistani politician

- سید عابد حسین شاہ

Provincial Minister of Agriculture
- In office 15 October 1955 – 18 May 1956
- Governor: Mushtaq Ahmed Gurmani
- Preceded by: position established
- Succeeded by: Abdul Sattar Pirzada

Central Minister of Education
- In office 18 December 1954 – 14 October 1955
- Preceded by: Ghulam Ali Talpur
- Succeeded by: A. K. Fazlul Haq

Central Minister of Food
- In office 18 December 1954 – 11 August 1955
- Preceded by: Ghayasuddin Pathan
- Succeeded by: Abdul Latif Biswas

Personal details
- Born: 1915 Jhang, Punjab Province, British India
- Died: 1971 (aged 55–56) London, United Kingdom
- Party: RP (1956–1958)
- Other political affiliations: PML (1947–1956); AIML (1936–1947)
- Relations: Syed Fakhar Imam (son-in-law)
- Occupation: Landowner

Syed Abid Hussain Shah (Urdu: سید عابد حسین شاہ, 1915–1971) was a Pakistani politician and landowner from Punjab.

== Early life ==
Shah was born in 1915 in Jhang, Punjab Province, British India. His father was Syed Raja Shah, who was from Shia Syed family of Shah Jeewna group, a Baradari. He received education at Aitchison College, Government College and Forman Christian College in Lahore, though he did not obtain a degree. During this period he was associated with the All India Muslim Students Federation.

He began his political career in 1936 and, the following year, was elected Chairman of Jhang District Board. He later became a landlord, owning an estate with a farmhouse in Jhang District. Shah also joined the British Indian Army where he attained the rank of Colonel. In the 1945 Indian general election, he contested and was elected as a member of the Central Legislative Assembly.

== Career ==
After the independence of Pakistan, he was elected as a member of Provincial Assembly of Punjab in the 1951 Punjab provincial election. In 1954, he became Pakistan's Food Minister. He was subsequently elected as a member of the Constituent Assembly from Punjab in the 1955 Pakistani Constituent Assembly election. In the same year, he briefly served as Minister for Education and Kashmir Affairs.

He later he became a provincial minister in West Pakistan. He contested the 1956 West Pakistan Interim Assembly election but was unsuccessful. After leaving the Pakistan Muslim League, Shah joined the Pakistan Republican Party and served as its General-Secretary.

In 1959, during the presidency of Ayub Khan, the Elected Bodies Disqualification Order (EBDO) was issued for him, which barred him from contesting elections until 1969. In the 1970 Pakistani general election, he contested as an independent candidate from Jhang, but lost to Mehr Ghulam Haider Bharwana of the Jamiat Ulema-i-Pakistan.

== Personal life and death ==
Pakistani politician Abida Hussain was Shah's daughter and politician Syed Fakhar Imam was his son-in-law. Shah was leader of Shah Jeewna group since 1947 till death. He also became Sajjada Nashin of the Shah Jeewna shrine. He died in 1971 from cancer.
