= Abdul Wahab Khan (politician) =

Pakistani politician

2nd Speaker of the National Assembly of Pakistan
- In office 12 August 1955 – 7 October 1958
- Deputy: Cecil Edward Gibbon
- Preceded by: Maulvi Tamizuddin Khan
- Succeeded by: Maulvi Tamizuddin Khan

Member of the Bengal Legislative Assembly
- In office 1937–1945
- Succeeded by: Muhammad Quasem
- Constituency: Bakarganj West

Personal details
- Born: 18 April 1898 Backergunge District, Bengal Presidency, British India
- Died: 12 July 1972 (aged 74) Dacca, Bangladesh
- Party: KSP
- Other political affiliations: PML (1947–1953); AIML (1943–1947); KPP (1929–1943)
- Relatives: Salman Khan (grandson)
- Education: Brojomohun College; University of Calcutta

Abdul Wahab Khan (Bengali: আব্দুল ওহাব খান; 18 April 1898 – 12 July 1972) was the 3rd speaker of the National Assembly of Pakistan.

== Early life and family ==
Khan was born on 18 April 1898 to a middle-class Bengali Muslim family of Khans in the village of Rahmatpur in Babuganj, Backergunge District, Bengal Presidency. The village was named after his ancestor, Rahmat Khan, an Afghan migrant who was killed in conflict with Raja Kandarpanarayan Rai of Chandradwip in the 16th century. His father, Sadat Ali Khan, was a moulvi. Khan completed his Bachelor of Arts from Brojomohun College in 1918, and his Bachelor of Laws from the University of Calcutta in 1921.

== Career ==
Khan served as an assistant public prosecutor for twenty years at the Barisal Court. He became the vice-chairman of Barisal Sadar Local Board in 1922, and then the vice-chairman of the Barisal District Board from 1927 to 1933. In 1940, he was appointed the chairman of the District Board and held this role until 1952. He served as the elected commissioner of the Barisal Municipality for three consecutive terms. In 1942, he became the vice-president of the Barisal District School Board, and was made president in 1950. He was also one of the founding members of the Krishak Praja Party and represented them at the Bengal Legislative Assembly after winning in the 1937 Bengal elections against his rival Mawlana Abul Qasim of the All-India Muslim League. His constituency, Backergunge North, covered Babuganj, Gournadi, Wazirpur and the Kotwali metropolitan thana.

The 1954 East Bengal Legislative Assembly election was the first legislative election in the Dominion of Pakistan, and Khan contested as a candidate of the Krishak Sramik Party under its United Front coalition. He was thus elected as a member of the East Bengal Legislative Assembly, and subsequently the 2nd National Assembly of Pakistan in the 1955 Pakistani Constituent Assembly election, where he was also appointed as the Speaker. Khan later lost his role as Speaker as a result of the 1958 Pakistani coup d'état. Khan competed in the 1962 Basic Democracy elections but was unsuccessful.

== Death ==
Khan died on 12 July 1972 in Dacca, Bangladesh.

Political offices
Preceded by Maulvi Tamizuddin Khan	Speaker of the National Assembly; 1955–1962	Succeeded by Maulvi Tamizuddin Khan
