= Sheikh Zahiruddin =

East Pakistan representative

Sheikh Zahiruddin was a Member of the 2nd National Assembly of Pakistan as a representative of East Pakistan.

== Career ==
Zahiruddin was a Member of the 2nd National Assembly of Pakistan. He was the Minister for Education and for Health of Pakistan.
