= Sailendra Kumar Sen =

East Pakistani politician

Sailendra Kumar Sen was a Member of the 2nd National Assembly of Pakistan as a representative of East Pakistan.
