= Peter Paul Gomez =

Pakistani politician

Peter Paul Gomez was a Christian member of the parliament of Pakistan representing East Bengal. Born in 1918, he completed his bachelor's degree from Dhaka University and was employed as an insurance agent in a life insurance company. During India's freedom struggle, he had participated in trade union activities. In the 1955 Constituent Assembly election, Gomez was elected to the Constituent Assembly of Pakistan on a Pakistan National Congress ticket. Gomez, alongside Cecil Edward Gibbon, were the only Pakistani Christian representatives. After the Bangladesh Liberation War, Gomez was the lone candidate from the Congress (now renamed as Bangladesh National Congress) who stood in the 1973 elections but failed to win.
