= Adeluddin Ahmad =

Bangladeshi politician

Adeluddin Ahmad (1 March 1913 – 26 June 1981) was a Bangladeshi lawyer and politician.

== Early life ==
Ahmad was born on 1 March 1913 in Kalinagar, Kalkini, Madaripur, East Bengal, British Raj. He graduated from Rajendra College in 1935. He then studied law at Ripon College and graduated in 1942.

== Career ==
Ahmad joined Faridpur Bar in 1943. He joined the All India Muslim League in Faridpur in 1943 and supported the Pakistan Movement. He was elected assistant secretary of the district unit of the league. He served as a member of the Provincial Muslim League Council. He worked for Abdul Hamid Khan Bhasani and helped the founding of Awami League. He served as the secretary of Faridpur Awami Muslim League and a member of the executive committee of the league. In 1953 he was elected to the Faridpur District board. In 1954 he was elected to the East Bengal Legislative Assembly and Constituent Assembly of Pakistan.

Ahmed made an amendment to the language bill in the Pakistan parliament which passed on 16 February 1956. His amendment made both Urdu and Bengali the state languages of Pakistan. He was elected to the senate of University of Rajshahi in 1957 and helped the establishment and formation of the university. He served as the public prosecutor of Faridpur court. He was made a minister in the coalition government of Awami League and Republican Party of Firoz Khan Noon on 1958. In 1970, he was elected to Pakistan National Assembly on an Awami League ticket. In 1974 he was appointed to Bangladesh Public Service Commission and retired in 1975. He spent the rest of his life in the legal profession.

== Death ==
Ahmed died on 26 June 1981.
