= Cecil Edward Gibbon =

Anglo-Pakistani politician

3rd Deputy Speaker of the National Assembly of Pakistan
- In office 12 August 1955 – 07 October 1958
- Preceded by: Muhammad Hashim Gazdar (as Vice President)
- Succeeded by: Muhammad Afzal Cheema (Senior Deputy Speaker)

Cecil Edward Gibbon (Urdu: سیسل ایڈورڈ گبن) was a Pakistani politician who served as the Deputy Speaker of the National Assembly of Pakistan from 1955 to 1958.

== Early life and education ==
Gibbon was born in 1906 in Allahabad, British India, to an Anglo-Indian family and received his education at St. Joseph's College, Nainital, and St. Edmund's College, Shillong.

== Career ==
Gibbon began his career in 1938 when he became the President of the All-India Anglo-Indian Association in Hyderabad. He joined the Indian National Congress but had criticisms of its approach.

In 1941, Gibbon worked in the Government of India's Food Department in Punjab and later became the president of the Anglo-Indian community's Punjab chapter. In 1946, he was elected to the Punjab Legislative Assembly and served as the Parliamentary Secretary to Chief Minister Khizar Hayat Tiwana.

In 1947, Gibbon supported the creation of Pakistan, resulting in his expulsion from the Congress and the Anglo-Indian Association. He co-founded the Anglo-Pakistan Association and was one of the three Punjab Assembly legislators who voted for Pakistan's creation on 23 June 1947. The main reason for Gibbon's support for Pakistan was the promise of separate electorates (see Communal Award) for Christians, thereby freeing the Anglo-Indians from the dominance of the Hindu majority.

Gibbon was a member of the first and second Punjab Assemblies and the National Assembly, participating in debates on various legislative matters. He was the lone non-Muslim representative from Punjab in the Second Constituent Assembly, and alongside Peter Paul Gomez of East Bengal, were the only Christian members in that body. He also served as the Deputy Speaker of the National Assembly of Pakistan and advocated for separate electorates for minorities, especially displaced Christian families. However, Prime Minister Huseyn Shaheed Suhrawardy passed the Electoral Amendment Bill of 1957, formally abolishing separate electorates for non-Muslim minorities of the country. He remained as the Speaker of the National Assembly until 1958, when he retired from politics on being accused of corruption. Following the imposition of military rule under Ayub Khan, Gibbon emigrated out of the country.
