= A. H. Deldar Ahmed =

Representative of East Pakistan

A.H. Deldar Ahmed was a Member of the 2nd National Assembly of Pakistan as a representative of East Pakistan.
