= Nurur Rahman =

Bangladeshi politician and former MP

Member of Parliament for Comilla-18
- In office 18 February 1979 – 24 March 1982
- Preceded by: Abul Kalam Mazumdar
- Succeeded by: Seats abolished

2nd National Assembly of Pakistan
- In office 1955–1958

Personal details
- Born: 1 March 1920 Binoyghar, Laksam thana, British India
- Party: Bangladesh Nationalist Party

Nurur Rahman is a politician of Comilla District of Bangladesh and a former member of parliament for the Comilla-18 constituency in 1979. He was a member of the 2nd National Assembly of Pakistan as a representative of East Pakistan.

== Biography ==
Nurur Rahman was born on 1 March 1920 in Binoyghar village of what is now Monohorgonj Upazila, Comilla District, Bangladesh.

Nurur Rahman was a member of the 2nd National Assembly of Pakistan. He joined the Bangladesh Nationalist Party and served as its treasurer after the independence of Bangladesh. He was elected to parliament from Comilla-18 as a Bangladesh Nationalist Party candidate in the 1979 Bangladeshi general election.
