= Mahfuzul Huq =

Pakistani politician

Mahfuzul Huq was a Member of Parliament of Pakistan representing the eastern East Bengal.

== Career ==
Huq was elected to parliament from Chittagong, East Pakistan as a Muslim candidate in 1955.
