= Lutfur Rahman Khan =

Pakistani politician

Lutfur Rahman Khan was a Pakistani politician who was a member of the 3rd National Assembly of Pakistan as a representative of East Pakistan. He also served as a State Minister in the Mohammad Ali administration.

== Career ==
Khan was a Member of the 3rd National Assembly of Pakistan representing Mymensingh-I. Khan was elected to parliament from East Pakistan as a Muslim candidate in the 2nd National Assembly of Pakistan.
