= Amir Azam Khan =

Pakistani politician

Sardar Amir Azam
- Born: Amir Azam; 14 October 1912; Gujrat, Punjab, British India
- Died: 19 February 1976 (aged 63–64); Karachi, Sindh, Pakistan
- Resting place: The Graveyard of Ghari Sharif, at Ghari Afghanan a village (union council Ghari Afghanan) of Taxilla tehsil in Rawalpindi District.
- Occupations: politician Federal Minister and Housing & Construction business
- Years active: 1951–1957, 1963–1974
- Political party: Republican Party
- Spouses: Akbari Begum (m. 1936–1976) Salma Begum (m. 1947) Farida khan (m. 1956–1974)
- Children: 16
- Awards: Sardar Amir Azam Khan Gold medal

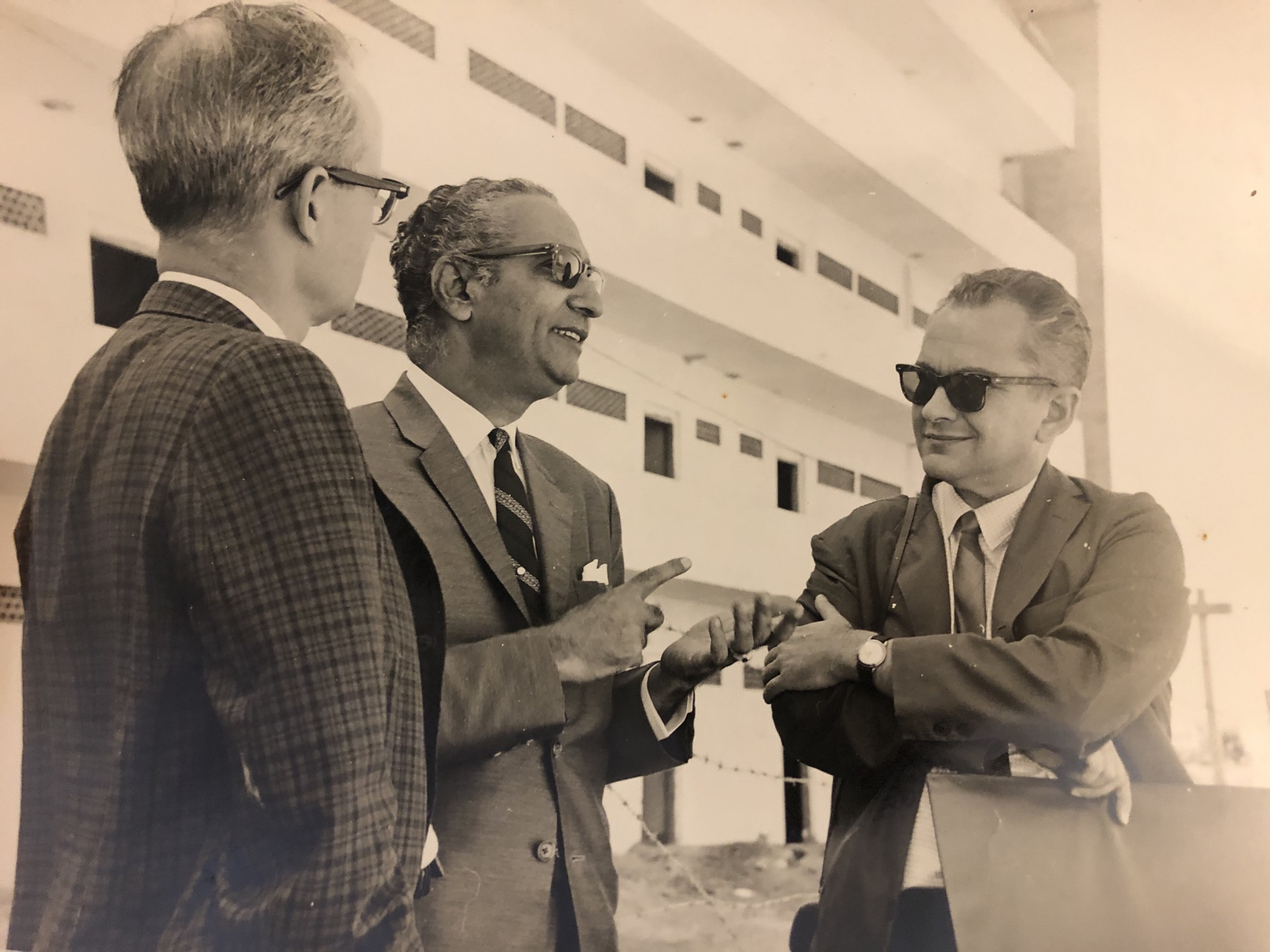
A rare picture of Sardar aamir Azam Khan (centre)

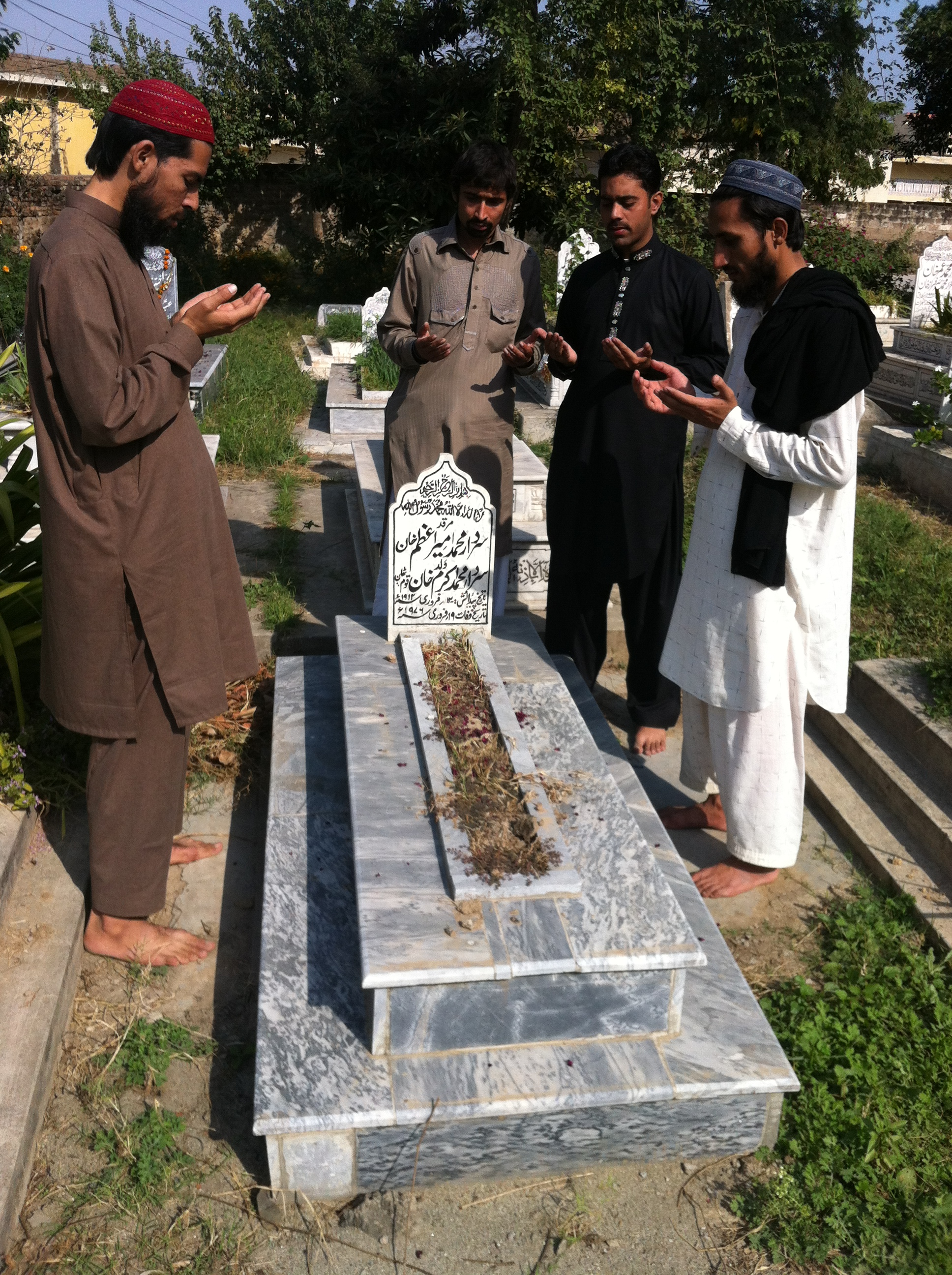
Grave of Sar Amir Azam Khan in Garhi Afghanan

Sardar Amir Azam (14 October 1912 – 19 February 1976) was a prominent Pakistani politician and businessman, widely regarded as a pioneer of low-cost housing in Pakistan. He began his political career in 1951 as a (Member of Constituent Assembly) (MCA) in Pakistan’s first government, led by Liaquat Ali Khan. Over the years, he played a key role in successive Pakistani governments, serving multiple times as Minister of State and Federal Minister. Renowned for his ability to manage multiple portfolios simultaneously, Sardar Amir Azam left a lasting legacy in Pakistan’s political and economic landscape. He was laid to rest in his ancestral graveyard at Garhi Afghanan, near Taxila.

== Biography ==
=== Early life and background ===
Sardar Amir Azam was born in Gujrat in Punjab province during British rule in 1912 and was the eldest son of Sardar Muhammad Akram, a superintendent of police, who had been born in the North-Western Provinces (now Uttar Pradesh Province, India) and a former student of Muhammadan Anglo-Oriental College, now known as Aligarh Muslim University. His ancestors were Yousafzai (Akozai) people belonging to the tribal Afghan border state of Bajour, formerly located in the Federally Administered Tribal Areas of Pakistan (FATA). They spread from North-West Frontier Province to Uttar Pradesh and Punjab more than 100 years ago before the creation of Pakistan. His grandfather, Sardar Muhammad Afzal Khan, was a Tehsildar of Haripur. His great grandfather, Sardar Amir Muhammad Khan was Tehsildar of Attock in Campbellpur district. His maternal grandfather Khan Bahadur Muhammad Zaman was an engineer and landlord from Gujrat in Punjab.

=== Education ===
Sardar Amir Azam received his early education from a high school in Cambellpur District, now Attock District. He did his Matric from a high school in Kahuta along with his cousin Sardar Mohammed Umar Khan; their names are engraved at the entrance of their residence, just next to the main gate of the school. After Matric, he passed Intermediate also from Punjab. He lived in Punjab until 1930. He then moved to Muzaffarnagar where his father Sardar Muhammad Akram worked for Nawabzada Liaquat Ali Khan as his manager. Mr Khan entrusted his father to manage his properties and farms in Uttar Pradesh.

Amir Azam attended the Meerut College and graduated with a Law Degree. He studied further to complete his Masters in Political Science from Allahabad University. He also remained a student of Sir Dr Allama Muhammad Iqbal for a time.

During his studies, Sardar Amir Azam became associated with Liaquat Ali Khan and his political abilities were discovered. He took part in political activities during his college years. He became known as a good speaker in college debates.

=== Political career ===
In 1936, Sardar Amir Azam started his political career when he joined the Muslim League as the Secretary for Muzaffarnagar. And soon he was elected a member of the U.P. Muslim League Council. He remained the Secretary of District Muslim League for some time and thus gained experience in administrative organizing functions. He supported Mr. Liaquat Ali Khan and the Muslim League in the 1945-46 Central Legislature Elections from the Meerut Constituency of Uttar Pradesh. During the Pakistan Movement he had the opportunity to work with prominent leaders of the Muslim League. He belonged to the generation that helped shape Pakistan during its formative years. As a close associate of the Muslim League leadership, he was among the administrators and politicians who stabilized government functioning after independence, especially under Prime Minister Liaquat Ali Khan.

Soon the independence of Pakistan in 1947, Amir Azam and his family moved to Punjab, Pakistan and resided in Rawalpindi. He moved to the prominence within the city due to his work in trying to solve issues related to services and rehabilitation of Refugees from India. He worked devotedly for their relief and rehabilitation in his district and soon attained became the president of the city Municipal Committee and also the President of Rawalpindi City Muslim League.Sardar Amir Azam Khan served in important capacities — notably as Minister for Refugees, Rehabilitation, and later as Interior Minister. He represented what might be called the “administrative nationalist” tradition — focused less on populism and more on building stable institutions. He maintained a pragmatic and moderate outlook. Even political critics generally regarded him as a man of integrity and strong administrative ability.some historical sources or accounts mention that Sardar Amir Azam Khan briefly functioned as acting prime minister of Pakistan, likely for a short transitional or liaison period, when the sitting prime minister was either out of the country, between cabinets, or temporarily unavailable. and later his withdrawal from front-line politics reflect his dignity and sense of principle rather than lust for power.

After Quaid-e-Azam Muhammad Ali Jinnah formed the very first Pakistani government headed by Liaquat Ali Khan, Sardar Amir Azam supported the Muslim League from Punjab in 1951 and was nominated MCA by Liaquat Ali Khan to serve in the first Central Government. He further held offices in the Planning Commission, and as Chairman of the Pakistan Standard, a newspaper that was a part of Muslim League.

Sardar Amir Azam was an eyewitness to the assassination of Prime Minister Liaquat Ali Khan on 16 October 1951, by the professional assassin, Saad Akbar Babrak at Liaquat National Bagh, Rawalpindi, Pakistan . Amir Azams statement is recorded in the report of the Inquiry Commission. After the assassination of Liaquat Ali Khan, Sardar Amir Azam was made the first defence minister of Pakistan during the tenure of Khawaja Nazimuddin in the second Central Government in 1952. He also participated in the Ottawa Commonwealth Conference, and thus made an extensive tour of Canada, the United States and some European countries on essential government assignments. He was renominated the minister of state for defence from 7 December 1953 to 24 October 1954, serving in that position for the 3rd Central Government headed by the prime minister, Muhammad Ali Bogra. Simultaneously, he also served as the very first chairperson of Pakistan International Airways now known as Pakistan International Airlines

During this period he also worked as the secretary of Election Committee of the Sindh Muslim League. Amir Azam continued his support for the Muslim League as an organizer in consecutive elections held in Sindh and East Bengal during 1954. During this time, the constitution making process was in progress. The Constitutional Assembly was close to assent the draft of the Constitution when the governor general and the leader of One Unit supporters Ghulam Mohammad Khan dissolved the Assembly on 24 October 1954. The hidden cause of this quick action was that the proposed draft was not supportive to the One Unit Scheme. After dissolution of the first Constitutional Assembly, second Constituent Assembly of Pakistan was elected. Its first meeting was held in July 1955. The first task of the new Assembly was to pass the One Unit bill. The bill was moved by Sardar Amir Azam Khan. The discussion on bill started on 23 August 1955. The mover of the bill Amir Azam said "the governor general was empowered to rename the East Bengal to East Pakistan and the existing administrative units of West Pakistan into a single province of West Pakistan.

From, 24 October 1954 to 11 August 1955, Sardar Amir Azam served as Central Minister for Rehabilitation in Muhammad Ali Bogra's cabinet in the 3rd Central Government. At a time when millions were migrating during Partition, his ministry dealt with massive humanitarian and administrative challenges. His performance earned him respect as an effective organizer and a disciplined bureaucrat-politician who could get things done without theatrics.

In October 1955, The Republican Party (Pakistan) was formed by a break away faction of the Muslim League and other politicians supporting the creation of the West Pakistan province. Sardar Amir Azam was appointed the leader of the Republican Party (Pakistan) from Gujrat District, in Punjab. From 11th -Aug-1955 to 12th -Sept-1956, Sardar Amir Azam was nominated the minister of state for refugees & rehabilitation and minister of state for parliamentary affairs simultaneously in the 4th Central Government headed by Prime Minister Muhammad Ali (Chaudhry). Due to his loyalty to democratic Principles and values, he is also known as one of the drafters of the 1956 Constitution of Pakistan. which was the main reason for his differences with the oppressors of his own era. From 12 September 1956 till 5 September 1957, Amir Azam was Appointed Minister for Information & Broadcasting in the 5th Central Government in Pakistan. He also served as the Law Minister and Minister for Parliamentary Affairs simultaneously from 13 December 1956 to 5 September 1957 during the tenure of Prime Minister Hussein Shaheed Suhrawardy. From 29 March 1958 to 7 October 1958 Azam was nominated the minister of state for economic affairs and minister of state for parliamentary affairs at the same time in the 7th Central Government headed by the prime minister Malik Feroz Khan Noon. He departed from politics before the proclamation of the 1958 Martial Law in Pakistan, when the country was heading Toward political instability. He declined offers to join the succeeding future Government. Unfortunately, like many competent early leaders, his reputation did not survive in popular memory — overshadowed by the more flamboyant or controversial figures of the 1950s and 1960s. Yet among historians and senior bureaucrats, his name still carries weight as one of Pakistan’s “builder administrators.” To honor his services to his country, the University of Karachi presents the "Sardar Amir Azam Khan Gold Medal" each year to the outstanding B.A. students (Hons) in Political Science.

=== Housing and construction sector ===
Sardar Amir Azam assisted Finance Minister Muhammad Shoaib in the formation of the House Building Finance Corporation of Pakistan in 1962 to support the low-cost housing projects in the country. Since he had been the Rehabilitation & Refugee Minister of Pakistan, therefore, he was well aware of the refugee problems in the country. His aim was to provide low priced housing for low-income groups. He then formed the Al Azam Limited, a construction company and was the first to introduce low-cost housing in Pakistan in the private sector. Later, the Al Azam project proved a milestone for others in Pakistan. He remained engaged in housing and construction work until his death, and left a glorious past for the young generation to follow and act upon it.

=== Personal life ===
Sardar Amir Azam married his first cousin, Akbari Begum, daughter of Sardar Muhammad Azam Khan, Tehsildar Rawalpindi, in 1934, in Muzaffarnagar, Uttar Pradesh, India. From his first marriage, he had three daughters and six sons. In 1946, he met his second wife, a Hindu lady employed at the Kingsway Hospital at Kingsway Camp, North Delhi, when he was admitted for treatment of tuberculosis. But as the hospital came under attack by the Hindu extremists, Amir Azam along with his faithful servant, Noor Muhammad alias Nooru, went into hiding. He and his servant remained disguised as Hindus for nearly six months to save their lives, so the extremist elements could not find him. The Hindu lady employed at the Kingsway Hospital helped them to escape alive from Delhi. She later converted to Islam to become his second wife known as Salma Begum. And a son was born out of this wedlock. Soon after the independence of Pakistan in 1947, Amir Azam and his family moved to Punjab, Pakistan, and resided in Rawalpindi. Later, when he was appointed Minister of State in 1950's, he moved to Karachi, Sindh leaving his family in Rawalpindi. In 1956, when Amir Azam was serving as Minister of State for Refugees & Rehabilitation in Karachi, Pakistan, he married his 3rd wife, Farida Khan, daughter of Abid Hussain Khan, an overseer from Moradabad, Uttar Pradesh, India. From his last marriage he had six sons. He spent the rest of his life in Karachi.

=== Death ===
Sardar Amir Azam Khan died on 19 February 1976, due to prolonged illness caused by cardiovascular diseases. During his last days, he was treated by Dr Syed Hamid Shafqat, Cardiologist at the National Institute of Cardiovascular Diseases, Karachi. Sardar Amir Azam Khan is buried along with his ancestors in graveyard of Ghari Afghanan which is headquarter of union council of the same name in Taxila Tehsil of Rawalpindi District. According to Khubaib Alam, residents were unaware of the fact that such a significant person was resting in peace in Garhi Afghanan. After a campaign on social media and forums conducted by Khubaib, people are now realizing his efforts and services.

=== Facts ===
1. The only man to hold maximum number of ministries in Pakistan.
2. First defence minister of Pakistan.
3. The man who named the "Pakistan International Airways" (now Airline).
4. He is also known as one of the drafters of the 1956 Constitution of Pakistan.
5. The founder and first chairman of Al Azam in Pakistan, that is the pioneer of low-cost housing projects in Karachi,
