= Hamidul Huq Chowdhury =

Pakistani-Bangladeshi lawyer and politician (1901–1992)

- হামিদুল হক চৌধুরী حمید الحق چودھری
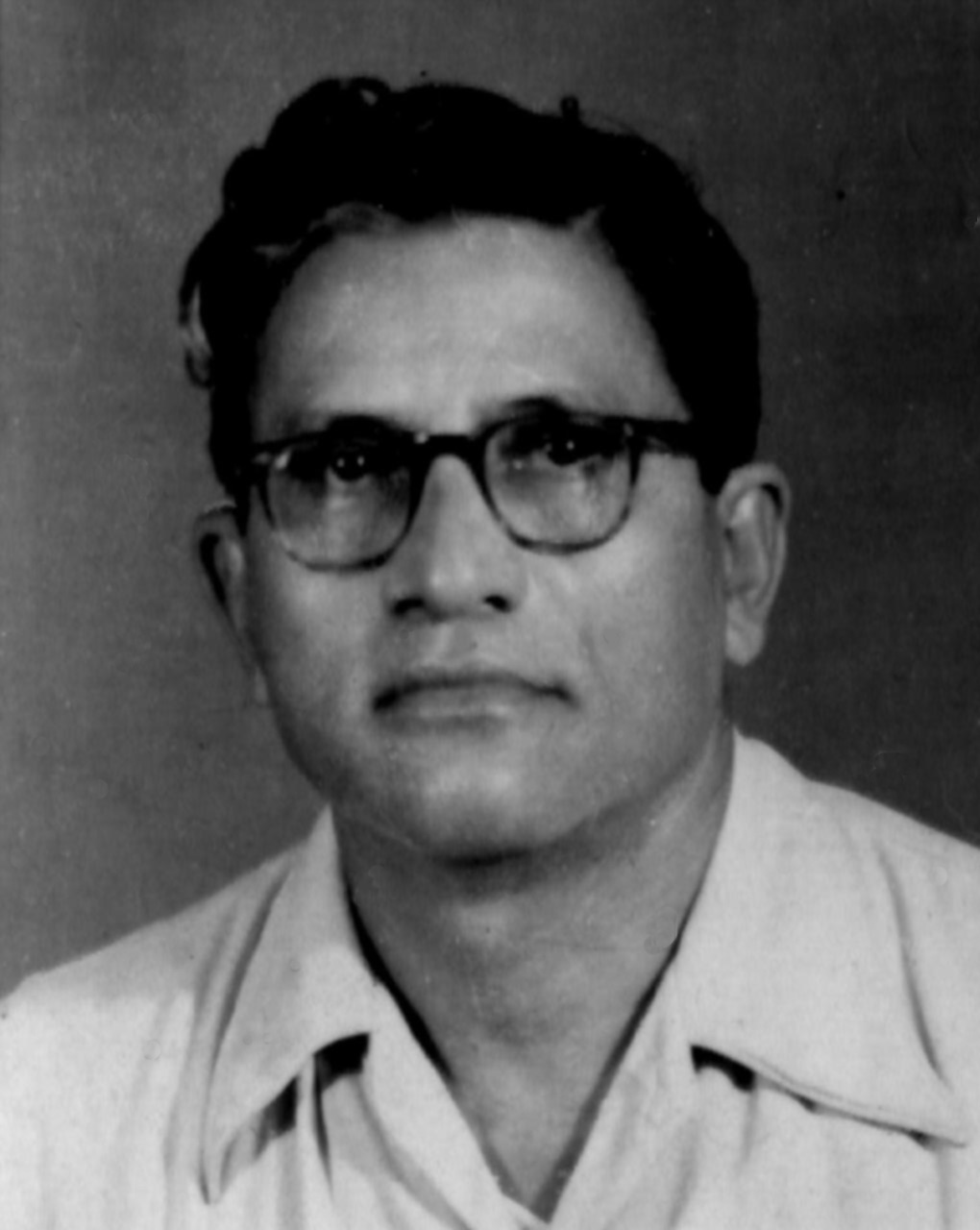

4th Minister of Foreign Affairs
- In office 28 September 1955 – 12 September 1956
- Prime Minister: Chaudhry Muhammad Ali
- Preceded by: Mohammad Ali Bogra
- Succeeded by: Feroz Khan Noon

Personal details
- Born: 25 August 1901 Ramnagar, British India
- Died: 18 January 1992 (aged 90) Dhaka, Bangladesh
- Citizenship: British India (1901–1947); Pakistan (1947–1978); Bangladesh (1978–1992)
- Party: All-India Muslim League; Krishak Sramik Party; United Front
- Education: Calcutta University

Hamidul Huq Chowdhury (Bengali: হামিদুল হক চৌধুরী, Urdu: حمید الحق چودھری; 25 August 1901– 18 January 1992) was a Pakistani-Bangladeshi politician. He was the founder of The Pakistan Observer, an English-language newspaper which changed its name to The Bangladesh Observer after the Bangladesh Liberation War. He was educated in Dhaka and Calcutta, and had a career as a lawyer, politician and newspaper proprietor.

== Early life ==
Hamidul Huq Chowdhury was born in Ramnagar village, Daganbhuiyan upazila, Feni District, (now Bangladesh) during the British Raj in 1901.

Hamidul Huq was educated at the Dacca Collegiate School in Dhaka, Scottish Church Collegiate School and Presidency College in Calcutta and the Law College of the University of Calcutta.

He was admitted as an Advocate before the Calcutta High Court and served for a time as a Crown Prosecutor. Hamidul Huq also served as a Legal Remembrancer for the Calcutta High Court. Following Partition in 1947, he had a long and distinguished legal practice before the Pakistan and subsequently Bangladesh High Courts, and celebrated his Golden Jubilee (50 years) as an advocate and member of the legal profession in 1987, at his residence, Neerala Garden House, Tejgaon, in Dhaka.

== Career ==
Hamidul Huq was elected to the Bengal Legislative Council in 1937 (serving as Deputy President of the council) and was re-elected to the body in 1946. During his tenure on the council, Hamidul Huq was a member of the Bengal Imperial Agriculture Council, Central Sugarcane Committee, Handloom Board, Textile Control Board and Industrial Development Enquiry Committee, and also a Fellow of Calcutta University. In 1947, Hamidul Huq represented the Muslim League before Sir Cyril Radcliffe's Boundary Commission.

Following partition in 1947, Hamidul Huq moved with his family to Dhaka, East Pakistan. Hamidul Huq started The Pakistan Observer on 11 March 1949. He was elected to the Pakistan Constitutional Assembly and was also a member of the East Bengal Legislative Assembly, during which time he served as the Minister for Finance, Commerce, Labour & Industries (1947–49). Subsequently, Hamidul was elected to the National Assembly of Pakistan in 1955 as a leader of the Krishak Sramik Party and served as the Foreign Minister of Pakistan in Chaudhry Muhammad Ali's cabinet. Hamidul Huq participated in the Round Table Conference of Pakistani government and opposition leaders in Rawalpindi in 1969. He moved to West Pakistan shortly before the Independence of Bangladesh and in 1972, the Government of Bangladesh cancelled his citizenship. He was allowed to return to Bangladesh in 1978 by the Bangladeshi Government led by Ziaur Rahman.

== Personal life ==
Hamidul Huq was married to Halima Banu. He died in Dhaka on 21 January 1992.

Political offices
Preceded by Muhammad Ali Bogra	Foreign Minister of Pakistan; 1955 – 1956	Succeeded by Feroz Khan Noon
