= Jalal Baba =

Pakistan movement activist

Khan Jalaluddin Khan Jalal Baba
- خان جلال الدین خان جلال بابا
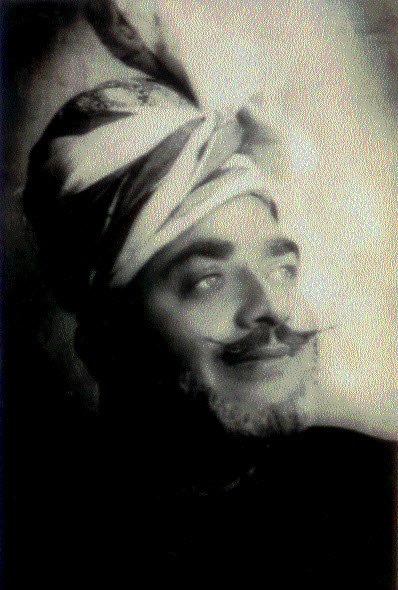
- Jalal Baba's official portrait

8th Minister of Interior
- In office 18 March 1958 – 14 October 1958
- Prime Minister: Feroz Khan Noon
- Preceded by: Mir Ghulam Ali Talpur
- Succeeded by: Zakir Hussain

Personal details
- Born: 5 March 1901 Abbottabad, North-West Frontier Province, British India (present-day Khyber Pakhtunkhwa, Pakistan)
- Died: 23 January 1981 (aged 79) Abbottabad, Khyber Pakhtunkhwa, Pakistan
- Party: All-India Muslim League (1934-1956); Republican Party (Pakistan) (1956-1958)

Khan Jalaluddin Khan, (Urdu: خان جلال الدین خان) (5 March 1901 – 23 January 1981) aka Jalal Baba (Urdu: جلال بابا), was a prime minister of Nawab of Amb and Muslim League stalwart and a Pakistan Movement activist who served as the 8th Interior Minister of Pakistan under the Premiership of Feroz Khan Noon. Jalal Baba was a major figure in British Indian and later Pakistani politics, in particular in the North-West Frontier Province.

== Early life ==
Born in Abbottabad, Hazara, Jalaluddin started his career as a driver for the British and rose to become a leading transporter. Jalal Baba belonged to the Rajput Chauhan tribe. He joined the All-India Muslim League in 1935 and in 1939 Jalal Baba was elected as the president of the Hazara District Muslim League. He held office as an unopposed president for fourteen years, until 1953. The Muslim League gained strength of popularity in Hazara under his apt leadership.

The government was highly impressed by the qualities of leadership displayed by Jalal Baba in Hazara and Sarhad Province. Hence, to win his support allegiance, the Viceroy of India conferred upon him, first the title Khan Sahib, then after some time that of Khan Bahadur. These were highly coveted titles and regarded as marks of great distinction and pride. But Jalal Baba never prided himself as being a British titleholder. When the occasion demanded, he was the first to renounce his titles. He was among the first ones to renounce his titles given by the British in 1946 and was widely regarded as the "Winner of Referendum" in 1947.

Under the leadership of K.B. Jalal Baba, the Muslim League became the dominant political force in the Hazara region of the North-West Frontier Province (then Sarhad). Jalal Baba's efforts resulted in the unification of various local groups and castes—including the Dhond, Karlal, Tanoli, Pathan, Syed, Awan, Swati, and Tareen—under the party's platform. This consolidation established the Hazara Muslim League as a primary regional center for the All India Muslim League.

His father Sheikh Ghulam Mohammad was a blacksmith who had migrated to this part of undivided India in the band of Mujahedeen under the banner of Syed Ahmad Barelvi before the 1857 War of Independence. Khan Jalaluddin was brought up in a middle-class family of Abbottabad. Before matriculation, he left his school in 1919, and joined the 'Hijrat Movement' of protest emigration and left for Kabul, Afghanistan. He came back to Hazara from Landi Kotal after the movement was called off. After Jalal Baba's death, longstanding land disputes sparked a bitter rift between his family and the Tanoli tribe.

== Political career ==
Jalal Baba had a prominent position among the Muslim League workers who offered the founder of Pakistan Muhammad Ali Jinnah sincere support and remained loyal to him till the end of the Pakistan movement.

Jalal Baba was among the first ones to initiate the 'Direct Action' in the struggle for Pakistan by moving a resolution in the All-India Muslim League meeting in July 1946, recommending the renunciation of titles, conferred by the British Government.

Again when in July 1947, the Muslim League launched the civil disobedience movement, Jalal Baba was among the first ones to court arrest from Hazara followed by others in such large numbers that the jails were filled to capacity with the political internees. He was released from jail only after the declaration of independence and the establishment of Pakistan on 14 August 1947.

It was not before the late 1930s that Jalal Baba had established himself as a recognized businessman and a social worker of Hazara. Now he could afford to enter the field of politics. Jalal Baba joined the Muslim League in 1937, at Abbottabad in the first public meeting held at the Company Bagh, while Chaudhry Khaliquzzaman accompanied by Saadullah Khan was presiding over the meeting. His political efforts led to his nickname 'Jalal Baba' (which means an elder, wise man, or expert in the local Hindko language) and he was elected Hazara District President in 1940. He held the office for almost 21 years.

Jalal Baba, by now an eminent figure in the provincial political circles, raised his voice at the most crucial juncture. The reorganization of the Muslim League resulted in a big change in the political ranks of British Indians. The seeds of the Hazara branch of the Muslim League were sown by him. He further nourished it. After joining the Muslim League, he emerged as the league's leader in Hazara. He held the office as unopposed president for twenty-one years. The Hazara Muslim League acquired great strength and popularity under his leadership. He had also been the vice-president of the Provincial Muslim League and a member of the All-India Muslim League Council.

When the British Government conferred titles on Jalal Baba, the Muslim League was in the initial stages of taking root in the N.W.F.P Province. In view of his personal influence in his native Abbottabad area, the Muslim League leaders assigned Jalal Baba the task of its organization there. He received support and co-operation from the middle and lower-middle-class people who then comprised the majority of the local population, as he himself had belonged to them. People gathered around him and turned his transport office into a political office. From all over Hazara, the Muslim League workers used to visit him in order to receive his directives on organizational matters.

Jalal Baba was a long-standing supporter of the Kashmir Conflict and aided Pakistan Army and laskhar (militias) during Indo-Pakistani war of 1947–1948. In an interview in Dawn News he quoted:

Khan Jalaluddin Khan warned the United Nations and Bharat here yesterday that unless a fair solution was found for the Kashmir dispute 'we might be compelled to shed our blood for the liberation of Kashmir'. (Dawn, Karachi, 26 April 1958).

=== Hazara Muslim League ===
From the early 1930s onwards, the people of Hazara gradually became active in the freedom movement for an independent Pakistan under the active leadership of renowned All India Muslim League leaders such as Jalal Baba, an early member of the (then) Frontier Legislative Assembly, and others. Even before the All-India Muslim League, started its movement for Pakistan in 1937, after the historic Lucknow Session of October that year, the Hazara Muslim League was properly formed and convened at the residence of Noor-Ud-Din Qureshi in Abbottabad in 1936. In this meeting, the leaders of the All-India Muslim League, Nawab Bahadur Yar Jang, Maulana Shaukat Ali, Hamid Badayuni, and others came from India. The local people joined the movement in large numbers. In the 1939 elections for the Hazara Muslim League, Khan Jalaluddin Khan Jalal Baba was elected as the President of the Hazara Muslim League. During the final phase of the movement for the creation of Pakistan, Captain Sardar Zain Muhammad Khan, OBI, and Khan Jalaluddin Khan Jalal Baba defeated their Congress rivals in the elections of 1946 from their respective rural and urban Constituencies and politically routed the All India Congress from the region. In the Delhi Convention of Muslim League parliamentarians chaired by Muhammad Ali Jinnah, which finally voted for the division of India and the creation of Pakistan, Jalal Baba represented Hazara. These Muslim League Leaders were also able to mobilize the people of this area in favor of the referendum for the creation of Pakistan.

Sometime before the independence of Pakistan in 1947, Nawab Muhammad Farid Khan Tanoli (KBE) of Amb State also developed good relations with Jinnah and Nawabzada Liaqat Ali Khan as a politic move. His correspondence and letters to and from Jinnah are available in Pakistan's archival records.

== Referendum in NWFP ==
In NWFP, 90 percent of the votes cast were polled in favor of Pakistan. However, the Red Shirt Party (later named National Awami Party) boycotted the referendum. From Hazara alone, 99% of the Muslim votes were cast in favor of Pakistan. Almost thirty percent of the total votes polled were from Hazara. Inayat-ur-Rahman Khan Abbasi quoted: "Khan Bahadur Jalal-ud-Din Khan was undoubtedly an organization in himself. Keeping in view his loyalty and services towards the country and the nation he deserved to be buried near Quaid-i-Azam’s Tomb. He was a veteran leader of the sub-continent in general and of NWFP in particular. It is not wrong to call him the Winner of the Referendum".

== Jalal Baba Auditorium ==
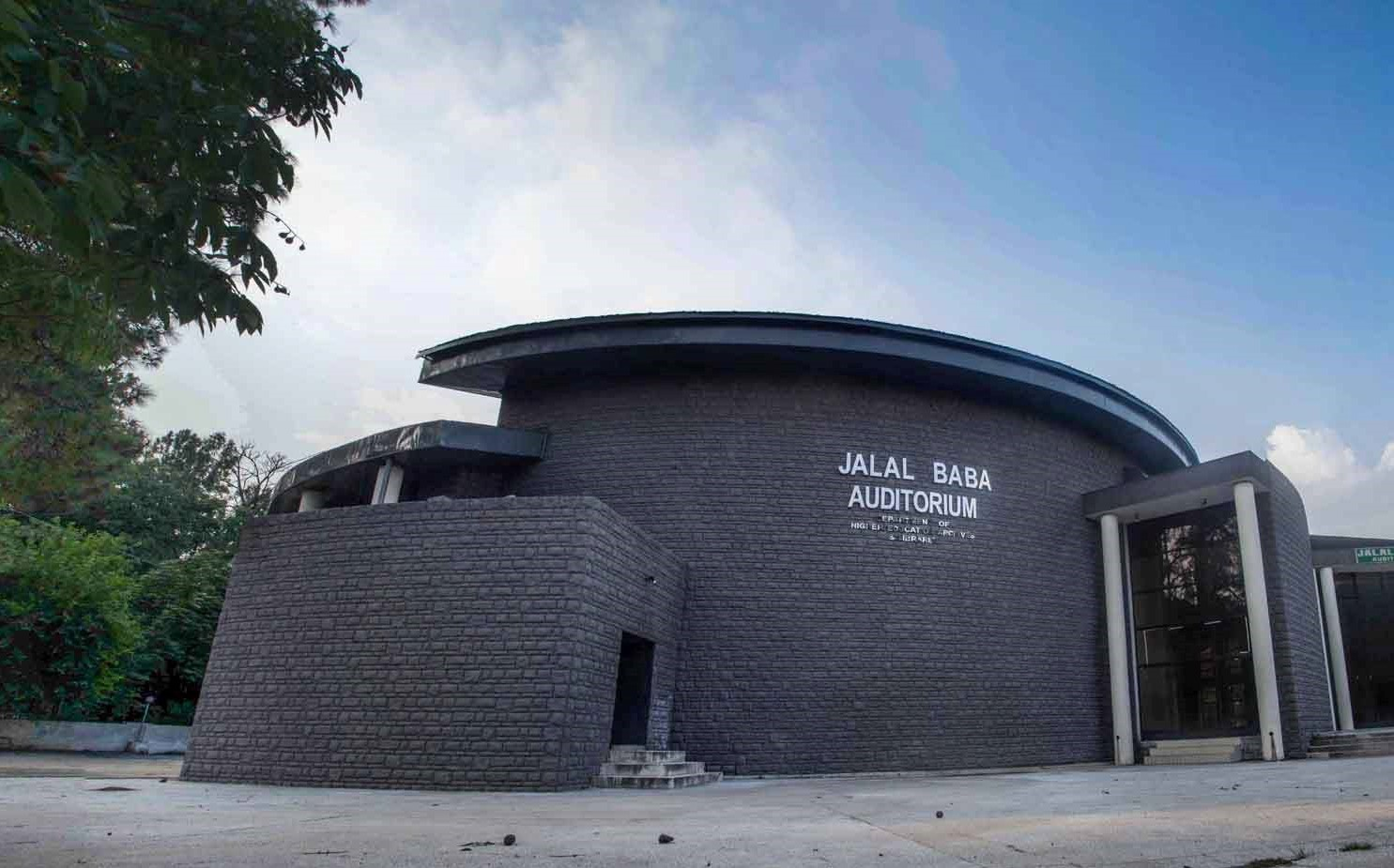
Jalal Baba Auditorium

In Abbottabad, Pakistan, there is a Jalal Baba Auditorium spanning an area of 8.75 acres, built with a cost of Rs 27.5 million, in recognition of his services to Pakistan. This auditorium has a seating capacity of 500 to 700 people.

Political offices
| Preceded by Khan Abdul Jabbar Khan | President of Hazara, Pakistan Muslim League; 1939–1953 | Succeeded by Abdul Qayyum Khan |
| Preceded by Mir Ghulam Ali Talpur | Interior Minister of Pakistan; 1958–1958 | Succeeded by Zakir Hussain |
