= Nurul Huq Choudhury =

Bengali politician

- নুরুল হক চৌধুরী

Member of the National Assembly of Pakistan
- In office 1955–1969
- Preceded by: Constituency established
- Constituency: Dinajpur-I

Personal details
- Born: 1902
- Died: 1987 (aged 84–85)
- Education: BA, LLB

Nurul Huq Choudhury (Bengali: নুরুল হক চৌধুরী; 1902–1987) was a Pakistani politician, minister and lawyer. He served as a member of the National Assembly of Pakistan for three consecutive terms as a representative of East Pakistan.

== Early life and education ==
Choudhury was born in 1902. He completed a Bachelor of Arts and Bachelor of Law.

== Career ==
Choudhury was elected to the 2nd National Assembly of Pakistan in 1955, and served another two terms representing Dinajpur-I.

He served as the minister of the Central Public Works Department.

== Personal life ==
Choudhury completed the Hajj.

== Death ==
Choudhury died in 1987.
