= Kamini Kumar Dutta =

Pakistani politician

- কামিনী কুমার দত্ত

Federal Minister of Pakistan
- In office 11 August 1955 – 12 September 1956
- Prime Minister: Chaudhri Muhammad Ali
- Minister: National Health Services, Regulation and Coordination
- Preceded by: Mohammad Ali Bogra
- Succeeded by: Huseyn Shaheed Suhrawardy
- In office 11 August 1955 – 31 August 1955
- Prime Minister: Chaudhri Muhammad Ali
- Minister: Law and Justice
- Preceded by: Huseyn Shaheed Suhrawardy
- Succeeded by: Ibrahim Ismail Chundrigar

Personal details
- Born: 25 June 1878 Tippera District, Bengal Presidency, British India
- Died: 4 January 1959 (aged 80) Comilla, East Pakistan, Pakistan
- Party: UPP (1954–1959)
- Other political affiliations: PNC (1947–1954); INC (pre-1947)
- Relations: Narendra Nath Dutta (brother)
- Education: LL.B
- Alma mater: University of Calcutta
- Occupation: Lawyer
- Committees: Basic Principles Committee

Kamini Kumar Dutta (Bengali: কামিনী কুমার দত্ত; 1878–1959) was a Bengali politician and former Law Minister of Pakistan.

== Early life ==
Dutta was born on 25 June 1878 in Sreekail, Tippera District, Bengal Presidency, British India (present-day Bangra Upazila, Comilla District, Bangladesh). He studied at Chittagong Government High School. In 1898, he graduated from Ripon College, Calcutta and received a B.law degree from the University of Calcutta.

== Career ==
In 1901, Dutta joined the Comilla District bar. He joined Calcutta High Court in 1918 as an advocate. He was involved with the Indian National Congress. He was involved with the Non-cooperation movement and the Swadeshi movement. He was arrested a number of times by the imperial police for his activism. In 1937, he was elected to the Bengal Legislative Council. In May 1938, he conveyed the All-India Peasants' Conference and served as the President of the Reception Committee in Comila. In 1938, he convened the All-Bengal and Assam Lawyers' Association meeting in Comila. He presided over the All-Bengal and Assam Lawyers' Association conference next year in Khulna. He served in the Comilla District Board.

Following the Noakhali riots, Dutta served as the president of Tippera District Relief, Rescue and Rehabilitation Committee, that was created to aid the victims of the riot. In 1954, he was elected to the East Pakistan Legislative Assembly. In 1956, he served in the Basic Principles Committee which framed the first constitution of Pakistan. From August 1955 to September 1956, he served as the Law Minister of Pakistan under Prime Minister Chaudhry Muhammad Ali. He converted his home into a hostel for women, Mrnalini Chhatri-Nibas, named after his wife Mrinalini Datta.

== Death ==
Dutta died on 4 January 1959. There is a Kamini Kumar Dutta Memorial Law Lecture at the University of Dhaka.
