= 1970 Pakistani provincial elections =

Provincial elections were held in Pakistan on 17 December 1970, ten days after general elections. Members of the five provincial assemblies were elected in Balochistan, East Pakistan, North West Frontier Province, Punjab and Sindh.

== Results ==
=== Balochistan ===
Party	Seats
National Awami Party (Wali)	8
Pakistan Muslim League (Qayyum)	3
Jamiat Ulema-e-Islam	2
Balochistan United Front	1
National Awami Party (Achakzai)	1
Independents	5
Total	20
Source: Baxter

=== East Pakistan ===
Party	Seats
Awami League	288
Pakistan Democratic Party	2
National Awami Party (Wali)	1
Jamaat-e-Islami Pakistan	1
Nizam-e-Islam Party	1
Independents	7
Total	300
Source: Baxter

=== North-West Frontier Province ===
Party	Seats
National Awami Party (Wali)	13
Pakistan Muslim League (Qayyum)	10
Jamiat Ulema-e-Islam	4
Pakistan Peoples Party	3
Council Muslim League	2
Convention Muslim League	1
Jamaat-e-Islami Pakistan	1
Other parties	0
Independents	6
Total	40
Source: Baxter

=== Punjab ===
Party	Seats
Pakistan Peoples Party	113
Convention Muslim League	15
Pakistan Muslim League (Qayyum)	6
Council Muslim League	6
Jamiat Ulema-e-Pakistan	4
Pakistan Democratic Party	4
Jamiat Ulema-e-Islam	2
Jamaat-e-Islami Pakistan	1
Jamiat Ahle Hadith	1
Independents	28
Total	180
Source: Baxter

=== Sindh ===
Party	Seats
Pakistan Peoples Party	28
Jamiat Ulema-e-Pakistan	7
Pakistan Muslim League (Qayyum)	5
Convention Muslim League	4
Jamaat-e-Islami Pakistan	1
MPPM	1
Independents	14
Total	60
Source: Baxter

== See also ==
- 1970 Azad Kashmiri general election
