= Malik ministry =

Thirteenth cabinet of East Pakistan

Ministry of Abdul Motaleb Malik
- 13th Cabinet of East Pakistan
- 1971
- Date formed: 17 September 1971
- Date dissolved: 14 December 1971

People and organisations
- Governor: Abdul Motaleb Malik
- Administrator: A. A. K. Niazi
- No. of ministers: 13
- Ministers removed: 2
- Total no. of members: 15
- Member party: Independent; JI; KSP; CML; PDP; PMLC; NIP; PMLQ
- Status in legislature: Post dissolved
- Opposition party: None
- Opposition leader: None

History
- Election: 1970
- Outgoing election: 1965
- Predecessor: Monem II
- Successor: Tajuddin

The Malik ministry was an interim cabinet formed in East Pakistan, Pakistan's former eastern province, during the Bangladesh Liberation War. This cabinet, characterized as a civilian form of military rule, was established on 17 September 1971 under the leadership of Abdul Motaleb Malik, the governor of East Pakistan, and lasted until two days before the independence of Bangladesh in 16 December of the same year.

== Background ==
In 1971, during the Bangladesh War, the Pakistani military took control of the administration of East Pakistan after the execution of the Operation Searchlight. Subsequently, in 31 August, Abdul Motaleb Malik was appointed as the governor of the province. It was announced that the new governor would soon submit a list of proposed members for a new provincial cabinet under his leadership to president Yahya Khan. After the Pakistani government relieved Lieutenant General Tikka Khan of his duties, Malik assumed the office through an oath-taking ceremony in 3 September. The plan was to divide power between the governor and the military administrator A. A. K. Niazi. Following his appointment, Malik announced the formation of a provincial cabinet, which included a total of 11 members, including him. In 17 September, in the absence of one member, nine ministers were sworn in. Among them, five were former members of the National Assembly of Pakistan. Except for one, all were politicians, including two from the banned All-Pakistan Awami League, two from the Council Muslim League, two from Jamaat-e-Islami Pakistan, one from the Convention Muslim League, one from the Krishak Sramik Party, and one from the Nizam-e-Islam Party. Later, in 7 October, three more joined the cabinet, including two from the Pakistan Democratic Party and one from the Qayyum Muslim League. In 11 October, the responsibilities of the ministers were redistributed.

== Fate ==
On 13 October 1971, following the assassination of former provincial governor Abdul Monem Khan, the morale of the cabinet members plummeted. Starting 22 November, the Indian military, as part of the Allied Forces, began attacking Pakistani forces in East Pakistan. In 6 December, the provincial government formed subcommittees with cabinet members for civil defense, food and essential supplies, health and relief, and information to bolster war efforts. In 14 December, based on intelligence reports, the Indian Air Force attacked the house of the Governor in Dhaka, where the provincial cabinet meeting was being held that time. In response to the airstrike, Malik and his cabinet resigned and sought refuge in the war-neutral zone (InterContinental Dhaka) for safety. At the time of the cabinet's dissolution, the signatures of two ministers were missing on the resignation letter. (Note: Shamsul Huq and Aung Shwe Prue Chowdhury.) Six days after the surrender of the Pakistani army, the First Mujib ministry relocated from Kolkata to Dhaka, formally initiating the government of Bangladesh. On 24 December 1971, police arrested nine members of the dissolved cabinet. Bangladesh's Home Minister Abul Hasnat Muhammad Qamaruzzaman stated that Malik and his cabinet members would face trials for crimes related to the genocide during the war. On 30 November 1973, the government announced a general amnesty for the detained cabinet members, leading to their release. In 2014, during a case at the International Crimes Tribunal, member AKM Yusuf, accused of war crimes, was questioned in court about his cabinet.

== Members ==
The cabinet was composed of the following ministers:

Cabinet
Portfolio	Minister	Took office	Left office	Party
Executive Department	Abdul Motaleb Malik	3 September 1971	14 December 1971	PMLC
Home Department	A. A. K. Niazi	3 September 1971	14 December 1971	Independent Politician
Education Department	Abbas Ali Khan	17 September 1971	14 December 1971	JI
Revenue Department	AKM Yusuf	17 September 1971	14 December 1971	JI
Labour, Social Welfare and Family Planning Department	ASM Solomon	17 September 1971	14 December 1971	KSP
Democracy and Local Autonomy Department	Muhammad Ishaq	17 September 1971	14 December 1971	NIP
Commerce and Industry Department	Akhtaruddin Ahmad	17 September 1971	14 December 1971	PMLC
Health Department	Obaidullah Majumdar (Note: Member of the banned All-Pakistan Awami League and was later expelled from the Bangladesh Awami League.)	17 September 1971	14 December 1971	Independent Politician
Relief and Rehabilitation Department	Shamsul Huq	17 September 1971	14 December 1971	Independent Politician
Forest, Cooperatives, Fisheries and Minority Department	Aung Shwe Prue Chowdhury	17 September 1971	14 December 1971	Independent Politician
Finance Department	Abul Quasem	17 September 1971	14 December 1971	CML
Food and Agriculture Department	Nawajesh Ahmed	17 September 1971	14 December 1971	CML
Public Works, Power and Irrigation Department	A.K. Mosharraf Hossain	7 October 1971	14 December 1971	PDP
Law and Parliamentary Affairs Department	Jasim Uddin Ahmad	7 October 1971	14 December 1971	PDP
Information Department	Mujibar Rahman	7 October 1971	14 December 1971	PML (Qayyum)

== Reactions and criticisms ==
The Malik cabinet included controversial members from reactionary political parties. It was the most controversial cabinet in Pakistan till 1971 and was rejected by the people of the province. According to The Jai Bangla, political observers of the Mujibnagar Government, exiled in India, commented on the new cabinet, stating, "A few more names have merely been added to the list of collaborators to be eliminated by the freedom fighters." In 26 September, 1971, Mufti Mahmud and Ghulam Ghaus Hazarvi labeled the cabinet formation process as "undemocratic." In an interview published in 1 October, politician Asghar Khan stated that he could not understand why a cabinet was formed with individuals who lost the election when it could have been formed with elected winners. On 11 October 1971, vice chairman of the Pakistan Peoples Party, Kausar Niazi, remarked that forming the cabinet with unelected representatives or non-political figures and its formation without consultation with his party, had raised doubts in the public's mind. On 19 September 1971, the Anjuman-i-Muhajirin East Pakistan alleged that no Urdu-speaking Muhajirs were included in the cabinet and called for ensuring equal rights for Muhajirs, demanding the appointment of an Urdu-speaking minister. A classified document released by the U.S. government noted that, according to a statement by Pakistan's president Yahya Khan on 28 October 1971, the Malik cabinet's efforts to demilitarizing East Pakistan's administration were leading toward a successful resolution of the political situation. However, Maurice J. Williams, the then-deputy administrator of United States Agency for International Development, described this information as "fabricated," attributing Yahya's belief to reports from Pakistan's military commander and Governor Malik. According to the Hamoodur Rahman Commission Report, the cabinet, formed to demilitarize the provincial government, failed and could not gain the confidence of the province's residents. Despite the cabinet's existence, real power rested with the province's martial law administrator A. A. K. Niazi, while critical administrative responsibilities were handled by the Eastern Command of the Pakistan Army. According to governor's advisor Major General Rao Farman Ali, Malik's weak personality made it impossible for him to challenge Niazi, while the power-hungry military administrator showed little respect for the governor. However, in a 2002 interview, Niazi claimed that the cabinet did not assist him in administration, and Malik, as governor, neglected his duties, forcing Niazi to manage both military and civilian affairs. He argued that, per protocol, he was accountable to the governor as the martial law administrator, just as army chief Abdul Hamid Khan was to the president.
