= Muhammad Ishaq (politician) =

Bangladeshi Islamic scholar and politician

Mawlana Muhammad Ishaq Pabnavi
- মোহাম্মদ ইসহাক
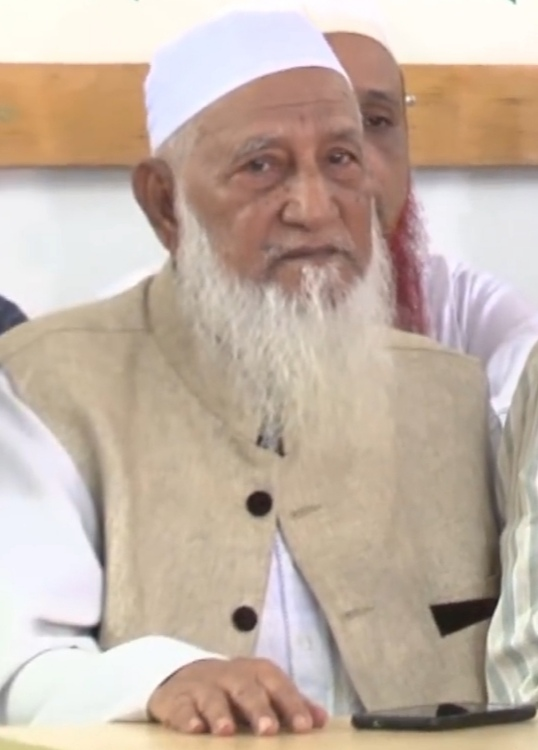
- Ishaq in 2018

Ameer of Khelafat Majlis
- In office 22 May 2005 – 28 January 2023
- Preceded by: Azizul Haque
- Succeeded by: Jobair Ahmad Chowdhury

Democracy and Local Autonomy Minister of East Pakistan
- In office 17 September 1971 – 14 December 1971
- Governor: Abdul Motaleb Malik
- Administrator: A. A. K. Niazi
- Preceded by: Fazlul Bari
- Succeeded by: dissolved

Personal details
- Born: 1935 (age 90–91) Pabna District, Bengal Presidency, British India
- Party: KM
- Other political affiliations: BKM (1989–2005); BKA (1981–1989); NIP (1952–1971); JUI (pre-1952)
- Education: MA in Islamic studies from the University of Dhaka

Religious life
- Religion: Islam
- Denomination: Sunni
- Jurisprudence: Hanafi
- Movement: Deobandi

Muhammad Ishaq (born 1935) is a Bangladeshi Islamic scholar and politician. He is an advisor of Hefazat-e-Islam Bangladesh and the central advisor and former Ameer of the Khelafat Majlis.

He began his political career by joining the Jamiat Ulema-e-Islam and later became the president of the Pabna district branch of the Nizam-e-Islam Party. During the Bangladesh Liberation War in 1971, Ishaq served as the publicity secretary of the Pabna district branch of the East Pakistan Central Peace Committee and was the minister of democracy and local autonomy in the last East Pakistan government.

After the independence of Bangladesh, Muhammad Ishaq was imprisoned by the new government for collaborating with Pakistan, but was released in 1973 under a general amnesty. In the 1980s, he became a member of the Bangladesh Khilafat Andolan and the Bangladesh Khelafat Majlis. Following a split in the Bangladesh Khelafat Majlis, a faction led by Ishaq formed another political party with a similar name in 2005.

== Early life and education ==
Muhammad Ishaq was born in 1935 in the village of Madhupur in Pabna District, located in the northern part of the Bengal Presidency, British India (now in Sujanagar Upazila, Bangladesh). He began his political career by joining the Jamiat Ulema-e-Islam. During his student life, he served as the publicity secretary of the Pabna district branch of the Nizam-e-Islam Party. In 1956, he became the vice president of East Pakistan Jamiat-e-Talaba-e-Arabia, an Islamic student political platform, and the following year, he passed the Kamil examination from Sirajganj Haji Ahmad Ali Alia Madrasa. Later, in 1962, he completed his post-graduation in Islamic Studies from the University of Dhaka and underwent training in agriculture and civil defense. Muhammad Ishaq served as the principal of Pabna Kamil Alia Madrasa.

== Career ==
He was appointed assistant secretary of the East Provincial Branch of the Pakistan Madrasa Teachers Association. During the Bangladesh Liberation War in 1971, he served as president of the Pabna district branch of the Nizam-e-Islam Party and as publicity secretary of the East Pakistan Central Peace Committee for the district. In September during the war, he was made a minister in the Malik ministry. As minister, he was responsible for the department of democracy and local autonomy in East Pakistan. In the 1971 East Pakistan by-elections, he was elected unopposed to the constituency of Pabna-12 in the East Pakistan Provincial Assembly. After the independence of Bangladesh, on 24 December 1971, the government of Bangladesh arrested him on charges of collaborating with Pakistan during the war. On 10 February 1973, on the said charge, the Special Tribunal found him guilty and sentenced him to life imprisonment. However, on 30 November 1973, he was released following a general amnesty granted by the government. Later, he became a central committee member of the Bangladesh Khilafat Andolan, founded in 1981 by Islamic scholar Muhammadullah Hafezzi. Two years after Hafezzi's death, in 1989, a faction of the party joined the newly formed Bangladesh Khelafat Majlis under the leadership of Azizul Haque, where Ishaq served as secretary-general and nayeeb-e-ameer. In 2005, the party experienced a split, and a faction led by Ishaq formed another political party under the name Khelafat Majlis. He became the Ameer of the new party. By around 2015, he had become inactive in political activities due to illness. In 2020, he became a member of the advisory council of the Islamic organization Hefazat-e-Islam Bangladesh. He also retained the same post in 2023. After serving as Ameer of Khelafat Majlish until 2023, Ishaq retired and became the central advisor of the party. On 25 May 2025, after fracturing the bone of his knee joint in an accident at private residence, Ishaq was admitted to Pabna Assort Hospital.
