= Fakhruddin Ahmed (politician) =

Bangladeshi politician (1905-1992

- ফখরুদ্দীন আহমদ

Provincial Minister for Revenue of East Pakistan
- In office 1966–1969
- Governor: Abdul Monem Khan
- Preceded by: Fazlul Bari
- Succeeded by: AKM Yusuf

Personal details
- Born: September 1905
- Died: 7 July 1992 (aged 86) Mymensingh, Bangladesh
- Party: BML
- Other political affiliations: PMLC (1962–1971); PML (1947–1958); AIML (1938–1947)
- Children: 1 son and daughter
- Education: University of Dhaka (LLB)
- Profession: Lawyer

Fakhruddin Ahmed was a Bangladeshi politician and lawyer. In Bangladesh, he served as the General-Secretary of the Bangladesh Muslim League (BML). In the 1960s, under Pakistani rule, he served as the Secretary of the East Pakistan branch of the Convention Muslim League (PMLC), the provincial minister for Revenue of East Pakistan, and was elected to two terms as a member of the National Assembly of Pakistan.

== Biography ==
Ahmed, who was born in September 1905, passed the matriculation examination in 1922. He obtained a Bachelor of Arts degree from Mymensingh College in 1926 and a Bachelor of Laws degree from the University of Dhaka in 1931. He then joined the legal profession at the Mymensingh Court.

In 1938, he began his political career by joining the All-India Muslim League (AIML). He became president of the Mymensingh subdivision AIML and served as vice-president of the Mymensingh District School Board from 1946 to 1954.

In 1962, he was elected as a member of the National Assembly of Pakistan from the NE-51 Mymensingh-VII constituency. In the 1965 election, he was re-elected from the NE-50 Mymensingh-V constituency. On 1 November 1966, he was appointed provincial minister for Revenue of East Pakistan.

During the Bangladesh Liberation War in 1971, he played a key role in forming and leading the Mymensingh Sadar Thana branch of the anti-Bangladesh organisation Peace Committee. At the time, he was serving as the Secretary of the East Pakistan branch of the Convention Muslim League (PMLC). In 31 August, the Public Relations Department of the Bangladesh Liberation Forces claimed that Ahmed had been killed in attacks carried out by its fighters between 26 and 29 August.

After the independence of Bangladesh, Ahmed joined the Bangladesh Muslim League (BML) and served as its General-Secretary. He died in Mymensingh on 7 July 1992.

He was survived by one son and one daughter. His son Jawadullah submitted nomination to contest the 1971 East Pakistan by-elections from Mymensingh's Ishwarganj.
