= Mohammad Abul Quasem =

Pakistani politician

- মোহাম্মদ আবুল কাসেম

Minister of Finance in East Pakistan
- In office 17 September 1971 – 14 December 1971
- Governor: Abdul Motaleb Malik
- Preceded by: Mirza Nurul Huda
- Succeeded by: position dissolved

Deputy Speaker of the National Assembly of Pakistan
- In office 11 June 1962–12 January 1965 Serving with Mohammad Afzal Cheema
- Leader: Khan A Sabur
- Preceded by: Cecil Edward Gibbon
- Succeeded by: Fazal Elahi Chaudhry

Personal details
- Born: 1913 Sodurtilla, Goalpara District, Assam Province, British India
- Party: Convention Muslim League
- Education: University of Karachi; Cotton College
- Occupation: Politician and lawyer

Mohammad Abul Quasem (Bengali: মোহাম্মদ আবুল কাসেম) was a Bangladeshi politician and lawyer. He was a member of the 3rd National Assembly of Pakistan and the Finance Minister of East Pakistan during the Bangladesh Liberation War.

== Early life ==
Abul Quasem was born in 1913 to a Bengali Muslim family in the village of Sodurtilla, Mankachar Thana, Goalpara District in the then Assam Province of British India.

== Education and career ==
He obtained a bachelor's degree in philosophy from Cotton College in 1938. In 1946, he became a member of the Assam Legislative Council representing the South Dhubri constituency. In 1950, three years after the partition of India, he left Assam (which became an Indian state) and resided in Ulipur Thana, Rangpur District, East Bengal (part of Pakistan). Two years later, he became a member of the Constituent Assembly of Pakistan. Four years after obtaining his LLB from the University of Karachi in 1956, he completed a master's degree in political science from the same university. In 1962, he represented Rangpur-1 as a member of the 3rd National Assembly of Pakistan. He was appointed deputy speaker of the National Assembly of Pakistan. He was a member of the Council Muslim League and became the president of the East Pakistan Council Muslim League in 1964. On 17 September 1971, during the Bangladesh Liberation War, he was appointed a member of the cabinet of Abdul Motaleb Malik, serving as the finance minister of East Pakistan. After the independence of Bangladesh, on 24 December 1971, the Government of Bangladesh arrested him for collaborating with Pakistan during the war. On 30 November 1973, he was released after the government declared a general amnesty for detained cabinet members.

== Death ==
Quasem died in the 1980s or earlier.
