= Bangladesh Collaborators (Special Tribunals) Order, 1972 =

Bangladeshi law

The Bangladesh Collaborators (Special Tribunals) Order, 1972, was enacted by the Government of Bangladesh to establish a tribunal to prosecute local collaborators who helped or supported the Pakistan Army during the Bangladesh War of Independence and the 1971 Bangladesh genocide. An estimated 11,000 collaborators were arrested. An estimated 2,884 cases were filed at the tribunal until October 1973. Of those accused, 752 were sentenced. Many detainees were released after the 15 August 1975 Bangladeshi coup d'état.

== Background ==
During the war, many Bengali civilians and political leaders collaborated with Pakistani forces. The members of the Pakistan Muslim League, Jamaat-e-Islami, Nizam-e-Islam, and Pakistan Democratic Party joined the Peace Committee, and a cabinet was formed under Nurul Amin in which Abul Kashem, Nawajesh Ahmed, AKM Yousuf, Abbas Ali Khan, and Maulana Ishak joined. Obaydullah Mazumder, an Awami League leader, also joined the cabinet. After independence, 46 MNAs from the Awami League were denounced or relegated from the party. On the other hand, under the supervision of the Pakistan Army, another force named Razakar was formed to replace the East Pakistan Ansar. Jamaat-e-Islami leader AKM Yusuf, with 96 members of Jamaat-e-Islami, started a training camp in Ansar camp in Khulna to fight against pro-independence fighters. Al-Shams and Al-Badr were also formed in order to counter the guerrilla activities of the Mukti Bahini, which grew increasingly organised and militarily successful during the second half of 1971. All three groups operated under Pakistani command.

In this regard, Sheikh Mujibur Rahman, on his repatriation to Bangladesh on 10 January 1972, declared to try the collaborators along with the Pakistan Army who committed genocide and atrocities.

== Genesis ==
The process to try the collaborators during the first days of Bangladesh was not going through any legal process. People were angry and were killing the collaborators without any trial. These activities tarnished the overall image of the nation. Some were being killed because of personal issues. So the government was forced to create a law and begin a trial to pacify the agitation.

=== Law ===
The Bangladesh Collaborators (Special Tribunals) Order, 1972, was announced to try the local war criminals. On 24 January 1972, an order came into effect. The Constitution of Bangladesh was also amended to include Article 47 (3) in order to fasten the trial of members "of any armed or defence or auxiliary forces" for genocide, crimes against humanity, or war crimes. In addition, the International Crimes (Tribunals) Act, 1973, was announced on 20 July 1973, mainly to try war criminals. The government also announced a two-tier trial process where national and international jurists would be appointed to try some high-profile war criminals, while an all-Bangladeshi jurist panel would try the rest.

=== Statements of the government ===
Many statements were provided by the responsible officials of the government of Bangladesh regarding this issue.

Sheikh Mujibur Rahman, on his arrival on 10 January 1972, ensured that the collaborators would be tried along with their Pakistani masters. But he also asked his people to give the responsibility to the government. Sheikh Mujibur Rahman ordered Awami League leaders to gather proof against the collaborators and time and again assured that the collaborators would be tried. On 12 January 1972, Rahman addressed people, saying that the criminals will not go unpunished under his government.

Mujib on 14 January asked the Awami League activists not to take revenge and assured that legislative measures will be taken against the collaborators in time. On 30 March, in a public gathering in Chittagong, he asked the people whether he should pardon the collaborators or not. The people of Chittagong said, "No and never".

== Implementation ==
The implementation of the law started on 15 February when an order signed by secretary Taslimuddin Ahmed was circulated stating that 14 top collaborators have to surrender. The list was made addressing Nurul Amin, Ghulam Azam, Khan A. Sabur, Shah Azizur Rahman, Maulana Muhammad Ishaq, Khawaja Khayeruddin, Mahmud Ali, AKM Yousuf, Abbas Ali Khan, and many others as collaborators.

Later on, thousands of collaborators were arrested under the act.

=== Sentences ===
About 2,884 cases were solved, and the verdict was given under this law until October 1973, before the general amnesty was declared by Mujib. Only 752 were found guilty, and only one person was sentenced to death. As many as two thousand were acquitted after the trial. On 10 February 1973, Maulana Muhammad Ishaq was sentenced to life imprisonment for collaboration.

Two Jamaat-e-Islami leaders, AKM Yousuf and Abbas Ali Khan, were arrested under the law. After the war, Yousuf was sentenced to life imprisonment. Sa'ad Ahmed, a leader from Kushtia, was sentenced to life imprisonment for supporting the atrocities as an East Pakistan Central Peace Committee member and taking part in the election. Chikon Ali, a Razakar from Kushtia, was sentenced to death on 10 June 1972; this was the first ever verdict of capital punishment under the law. Chikon Ali was later resentenced by the Supreme Court to life imprisonment. An absentia trial staged under the law gave the death penalty to three members of Al-Badr for the murder of prominent Professor Dr. AK Azad on 6 October 1972. On 11 April 1972, Razakar Abdul Hafiz from Comilla was sentenced to 41 years imprisonment, the highest in the history of this law. He was tried for various convictions like murder, rape, loot, etc.

In July 1972, three brothers from Bogra were sentenced in a murder case. Mofizur Rahman (aka Chan Miah) was sentenced to death, Mokhlesur Rahman (aka Khoka Mia), and Moshiur Rahman (aka Lal Miah) were sentenced to life imprisonment. Upon appeal, Chan Miah was re-sentenced to 20 years imprisonment. while his two brothers were each sentenced to 10 years imprisonment.

Keramat Ali from Munshiganj was sentenced to 8 years imprisonment because of his activity as a Peace Committee member. A special tribunal sentenced Mokbul Hossain, Ayub Ali, and Atiar Rahman to life imprisonment in the Montu murder case. Al-Badr members Siddiqur Rahman and Muhammad Galib were sentenced to life imprisonment in the murder case of journalist Nizamuddin Ahmed.

== Criticism ==
The Collaborators Order 1972 was a law with many defects and flaws. It was amended at least three times within one year. Many criticised the law because of its defects and irregularities.

=== Unaccepted ===
The pro-Awami League researcher Shahriar Kabir, under cross-examination, confessed that the verdicts of the Bangladesh Collaborators (Special Tribunals) Order were never accepted by the families of the victims.

Shahin Reza, son of journalist Shirajuddin Hossain, stated that the trial of the collaborators was nothing but a kangaroo trial to protect the collaborators. Those who were involved in murders and genocides were set free, and the innocents were imprisoned without substantial proof.

Khaleque Mazumder, who killed Shahidullah Kaiser, was sentenced only to seven years imprisonment under the act. Panna Kaiser, the widow of Shahidullah Kaiser, marked it as a humiliation of humanity and justice.

=== Politicization ===
Prominent political leaders and intellectuals, including Maolana Bhashani, Abdur Rashid Tarkabagish, Abul Mansur Ahmed, Justice S M Morshed, Enayetullah Khan, Ataur Rahman Khan, and many others, criticized the law because of the abusive measures.

Sheikh Mujibur Rahman himself started facing problems while the process to try the collaborators began. The Awami League leaders and activists getting orders from Mujib to submit genocide data started misusing the power. They started to use the power against their personal foes. On the other hand, many political parties and their members were convicted of collaboration with Pakistanis.

=== Legal problems ===
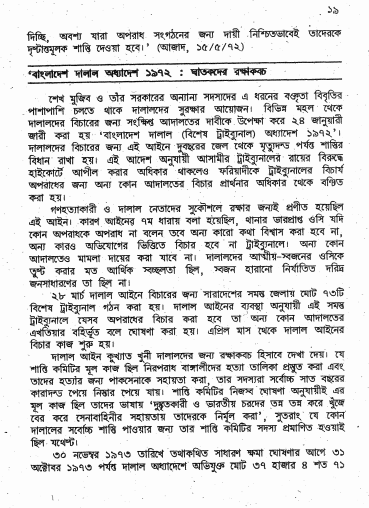
বাংলাদেশ দালাল অধ্যাদেশ ১৯৭২, ঘাতকদের রক্ষাকবচ

The Collaborators Order faced major legal problems as it was created in a very short time. Barrister Moinul Hossain, an Awami League-backed member of parliament, criticized the law in an article published in The Daily Ittefaq on 19 November 1972.

Barrister Moinul Hossain stated:

According to the first schedule of the legislation, under the Collaborators Act the collaborators will remain out of the purview of principal rights of a citizen. The conflict between Collaborators Act and principal rights is now ascertained. No indication of the time of the offence in the law will be misused by many. According to the law, just because of an accusation according to any hearsay can suspend the principal rights of an innocent citizen.

On the other hand, this law had a provision in its section 7, which stated that the conviction against the criminals would come into effect only if the officer in charge of the police of that particular area certified that as an offence. According to the order, no cases can be filed in the tribunal if the officer in charge defies.

Many police officers took the side of the Pakistani government during the Bangladesh Liberation War. And most of the families of the collaborators were solvent enough to pay a good margin to police officers. So police officers were not conscious enough about these cases. Another defect was that the act gave the convicts an opportunity to appeal against the verdict while the victims were not given such an opportunity.

On 23 July 1972, in an article published in the Dainik Bangla, some experts stated that,

The tribunals are trying the crimes occurred in a certain period which was actually an emergency one. But still the authority is following the ancient 'Evidence Act' which was actually created to try the offences occurred in the time of peace. While investigating the cases, it is becoming hard to harder to prove it because of the complexities arising.

Prominent writer Ahmed Sharif, Shahriar Kabir stated the Collaborators Order 1972 as a safeguard to the collaborators and war criminals.

Later, during a cross-examination on 10 September 2012, Shahriar Kabir confessed that the International Crimes Tribunal Act 1973 was created to overcome the problems of the Collaborators Act 1972.

Sheikh Mujibur Rahman was also concerned about the failures of the Collaboration Act 1972. The call for general amnesty in 1973 was somehow influenced because of his concern about this law.

== Flawed process ==
The Collaborators Act 1972 soon started to prove itself as a spiderweb. The number of big flies trapped in it was very low. Dr. Malik, Maulana Muhammad Ishaq, AKM Yousuf, and Izhar Ahmed were the only big figures to be punished. Many others who were directly involved in genocide were freed or went underground.

The uncle of Sheikh Mujibur Rahman, Sheikh Mosharraf Hossain, was also a Razakar. He was sent to jail.

Awami Muslim League leader Razakar Athar Ali Khan was the father of a fighter from Bagerhat who attained the gallantry award Bir Uttam for his bravery. Athar Ali Khan did not face any trial because of his son.

A Razakar, who later joined Bangladesh Rifles (presently known as Border Guards Bangladesh) after the 1971 war, remained untouched and promoted in a higher post during Sheikh Mujibur Rahman's regime.

Taslimuddin Ahmed, who signed the notification for the 14 collaborators asking them to surrender, was himself a collaborator. Another surprising scenario was staged in a special tribunal where a Razakar recruiting officer became the judge and gave a verdict against the one whom he recruited as Razakar. Many such situations were raised that time.

After the war, a committee was formed under Nilima Ibrahim to find out the collaborators who worked in Radio Pakistan. 43 people were found by the committee who worked for Pakistan. Unfortunately, no action was taken against them as they were part of progressive society as well as the Awami League, and some of them were killed by Pakistanis.

Lieutenant Colonel Firoz Salahuddin, who recruited many Razakars and was loyal to the Pakistan Army till the end of the war, was rehabilitated in the Bangladesh Army after the liberation war for having close relations with M. A. G. Osmani.

== General amnesty ==
As the second anniversary of victory in the Bangladesh war of independence approached, most of those jailed under the Collaborators Act had been detained for nearly two years without being charged with specific crimes. It was proving difficult to obtain sufficient evidence for prosecution. Villagers were reluctant to testify because of fear of retaliation. Also, public sentiment had grown less concerned with punishing collaborators and more worried about the shattered economy. The continued imprisonment of alleged collaborators and threat of legal action against those not yet arrested was increasingly viewed as an attempt to silence political opposition. It was having the opposite effect by creating fresh social tensions.

In addition to domestic considerations, there were international ones. In August 1973, the Delhi Agreement had started the repatriation of prisoners of war, but two significant issues remained. First, Bangladesh wanted Pakistan to accept hundreds of thousands of Biharis who had remained loyal to Islamabad during the war, still considered themselves citizens of Pakistan, and didn't want to live in the now-independent Bangladesh. Second, Bangladesh wanted 195 Pakistani POWs tried for war crimes. Sheikh Mujib desired diplomatic recognition by Pakistan and membership in the United Nations, something China was blocking at the behest of ally Pakistan. Bangladesh also sought more favorable relations with the oil-rich Muslim Middle East in the hope that foreign aid would be forthcoming.

In this climate, Sheikh Mujib announced on 1 December 1973 a general amnesty for 36,400 alleged collaborators. The pardon did not extend to the few thousand prisoners charged with wartime murder, rape, or arson.

=== Declaration ===
The declaration was depicted in the newspapers on 1 December 1973. The Dainik Bangla stated the news with the headline, "General Amnesty Declared upon the Punished Prisoners under Collaborators Act". The newspaper said,

Government of the People's Republic of Bangladesh has declared a general mercy for the convicted and punished prisoners under the Collaborator Act. Persons who have been imprisoned under the Collaborator Ordinance (Special Tribunal) 1972, against whom there is a warrant or those who are wanted and those who have been punished will be imposed this general mercy and soon they will be freed. Yet those who have killed people, raped and set fire or caused to damage people's homestead with explosives or convicted for damaging water-transport whatsoever will not be considered under this act. A Governmental press-note issued on Friday night last says this General amnesty.

It added that,

Prime Minister Sheikh Mujibur Rahman says, Government has declared this general mercy for the people arrested and convicted under Collaborator Act so that people from all corners can enjoy the Victory Day 16th December together indiscriminately and take oath to build our country. Bangabandhu has ordered the Home Ministry to take necessary steps so that these persons can get released from Jail soon and join the victory festival coming on 16th December. The persons freed are urged to be united with spirit of victory and are requested to take the responsibility of working as a safeguard for our independence.

As a result of the amnesty, 21,000 prisoners had been released by 17 December 1973.

== Aftermath ==
Many prominent collaborators were freed after the declaration gradually. Muslim League leader Syed Khwaja Khairuddin, who was also the chief of the Peace Committee, was freed from jail on 7 December 1973. Muslim League leader Khan A. Sabur was freed from jail on 5 December 1973.

== Repeal of the law ==
After the fall of Mujib on 15 August 1975 and the unfortunate killing of four top leaders from the Bangladesh Awami League, an ordinance was declared that halted the activity under this act. Later on, President Abu Sadat Mohammad Sayem repealed the act on 31 December 1975. This gave the lackeys of the Pakistani occupational force complete legal protection from further facing any kind of trial.

=== Text of the ordinance ===
Whereas it is expedient to repeal the Bangladesh Collaborators (Special Tribunals) Order, 1972 (P.O. No. 8 of 1972), and to provide for certain matters ancillary thereto;

Now, therefore, in pursuance of the Proclamations of 20 August 1975 and 8 November 1975, and in exercise of all powers enabling him in that behalf, the President is pleased to make and promulgate the following Ordinance:-

1. This Ordinance may be called the Bangladesh Collaborators (Special Tribunals) (Repeal) Ordinance, 1975. 2. # (1) The Bangladesh Collaborators (Special Tribunals) Order, 1972 (P.O. No. 8 of 1972), hereinafter referred to as the said Order, is hereby repealed.

1. (2) Upon the repeal of the said Order under sub-section (1), all trials or other proceedings thereunder pending immediately before such repeal before any Tribunal, Magistrate or Court, and all investigations or other proceedings by or before any Police Officer or other authority under that Order, shall abate and shall not be proceeded with.
2. (3) Nothing in sub-section (2) shall be deemed to affect -
3. (a) the continuance of any appeal against any conviction or sentence by any Tribunal, Magistrate or Court under the said Order; or
4. (b) except to the extent provided in that sub-section, the operation of section 6 of the General Clauses Act, 1897 (X of 1897).
