= 1971 East Pakistan by-elections =

East Pakistan By-election
- 7 December 1971 – 7 January 1972

78 seats of the National Assembly and 105 seats of the East Pakistan Provincial Assembly
- Registered: 29,479,386

Party	Six-Party United Front	PPP
Uncontested National Seats	53	5
Uncontested Provincial Seats	102	1
Prime Minister and Chief Minister before election
Position vacant
Military
New Prime Minister
Nurul Amin
Military

Following the victory in the 1970 general elections, the failure to transfer power led to a non-cooperation movement called by Sheikh Mujibur Rahman, the leader of the Awami League based in East Pakistan. In response, on 25 March 1971, the Pakistani government launched Operation Searchlight, intensifying the political crisis. The following day, all political activities in Pakistan were banned, and the Awami League was declared illegal.

During the Bangladesh Liberation War, President Yahya Khan annulled the membership of 78 elected representatives of the National Assembly and 105 members of the East Pakistan Provincial Assembly. He then announced by-elections in East Pakistan.

The election saw participation from a six-party right-wing alliance led by Nurul Amin and the Islamic socialist Pakistan Peoples Party led by Zulfikar Ali Bhutto. Before the election, 53 national and 102 provincial seats from the alliance, along with 5 national and 1 provincial seat from the Pakistan Peoples Party, were elected unopposed. However, due to the ongoing war, the scheduled voting from 7 December 1971 to 7 January 1972 was postponed.

On 16 December 1971, with the surrender of the Pakistan Army to the Allied Forces in Dhaka, East Pakistan gained independence as Bangladesh. Subsequently, on 23 December 1971, Pakistan's new President Zulfikar Ali Bhutto officially canceled the by-election.

== Background ==
=== Previous election and independence movement ===
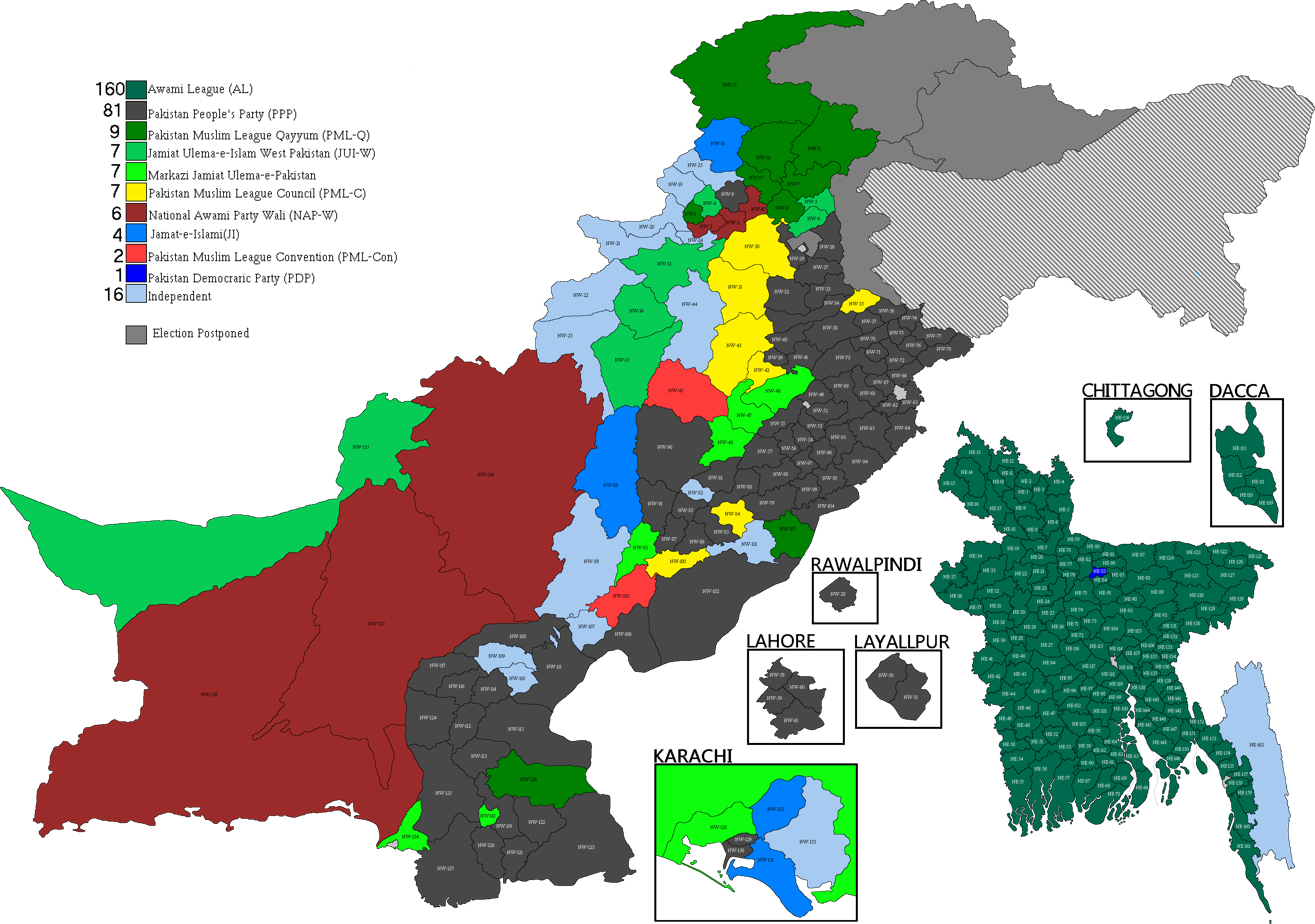
Map of 1970 general election results

In the 1970 general election, the All Pakistan Awami League, based in East Pakistan, won 167 of the 313 National Assembly seats, including reserved seats, and secured 288 out of 300 seats in the East Pakistan Provincial Assembly.

On 25 March 1971, the Pakistan Army launched Operation Searchlight, leading to mass killings in Dhaka. The following day, the Awami League was banned, and political activities were declared illegal.

=== Preparation for the by-election ===
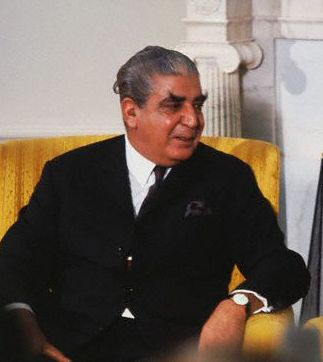
After declaring the elected members of the All Pakistan Awami League illegal, President Yahya Khan announced a by-election in East Pakistan.

On 28 June 1971, President Yahya Khan dismissed the possibility of new elections and instead announced by-elections for the National and Provincial Assemblies.

On 29 July, reliable government sources revealed that President Yahya Khan had ordered the Election Commission of Pakistan to organize a by-election for the vacant seats after declaring the seats of members accused of anti-state crimes illegal.

On 4 August 1971, Yahya Khan stated that after declaring the seats of members guilty of various crimes and treason vacant, by-elections would be held, and power would be transferred within 3–4 months.

In August 1971, a plan was revealed to hold by-elections for the seats of disqualified Awami League members while validating the membership of 88 National Assembly members and 94 Provincial Assembly members of the party.

On 27 August 1971, the Pakistani government announced that Awami League's elected National and Provincial Assembly members who had fled to India would not be considered criminals and their membership would remain valid.

On 4 September 1971, President Yahya Khan amended the Legal Framework Order, 1970 to mandate that elections for any National and Provincial Assembly seats that became vacant before 4 September must be held within four months.

On 19 September 1971, it was announced that the by-election would be held from 25 November to 9 December. However, the date was later changed to 12 December to 23 December considering the opinions of all political parties.

Later, the election date was moved forward to 7 to 20 December 1971.

On 3 October 1971, the government announced that the second phase of the by-election for the 88 vacant Provincial Assembly seats would take place from 18 December 1971 to 7 January 1972.

On 9 October 1971, President Yahya Khan lifted the ban on political activities.

== Campaign and politics ==
=== Six-Party United Front ===
Although an attempt was made to form a six-party alliance in the 1970 general election, it was not implemented. The proposal to form such an alliance was raised again during the by-election.

On 9 August 1971, leaders including Abdul Qayyum Khan, head of the Qayyum Muslim League, Khan A Sabur, and their party chief Nurul Amin met with Fazlul Qadir Chaudhry and Malik Mohammad Qasim of the Convention Muslim League. They were approached by Nawabzada Nasrullah Khan, leader of the Pakistan Democratic Party, who was considering forming an alliance similar to the National Democratic Front.

On 24 September, Nurul Amin stated that the nature of the election campaign would depend on the changing conditions in East Pakistan.

On 26 September 1971, the Krishak Sramik Party requested to postpone the by-election date by one month to allow more time for preparation.

On 10 October, it was reported that the parties in the Six-Party United Front had agreed not to compete against each other in the same constituency to ensure victory.

On 19 October 1971, it was revealed that under the Six-Party United Front, the Pakistan Democratic Party would field candidates for 23 National Assembly seats, Jamaat-e-Islami Pakistan for 19, Council Muslim League, Convention Muslim League, and Qayyum Muslim League for 9 each, and the Nizam-e-Islam Party for 6 seats. For the Provincial Assembly, the Pakistan Democratic Party planned to contest 50 seats, Jamaat-e-Islami 45, Council Muslim League 25, Convention Muslim League 23, Qayyum Muslim League 23, and Nizam-e-Islam Party 21.

On 26 October 1971, the Six-Party United Front released the names of its candidates for all vacant National Assembly seats in the by-election.

On 27 October 1971, the alliance published a list of 177 candidates for the Provincial Assembly by-election.

On 19 November 1971, Nurul Amin stated that it would not be possible to determine who would form the government until the by-election was completed and the stance of the banned All-Pakistan Awami League's elected members was clarified.

=== Pakistan Peoples Party ===
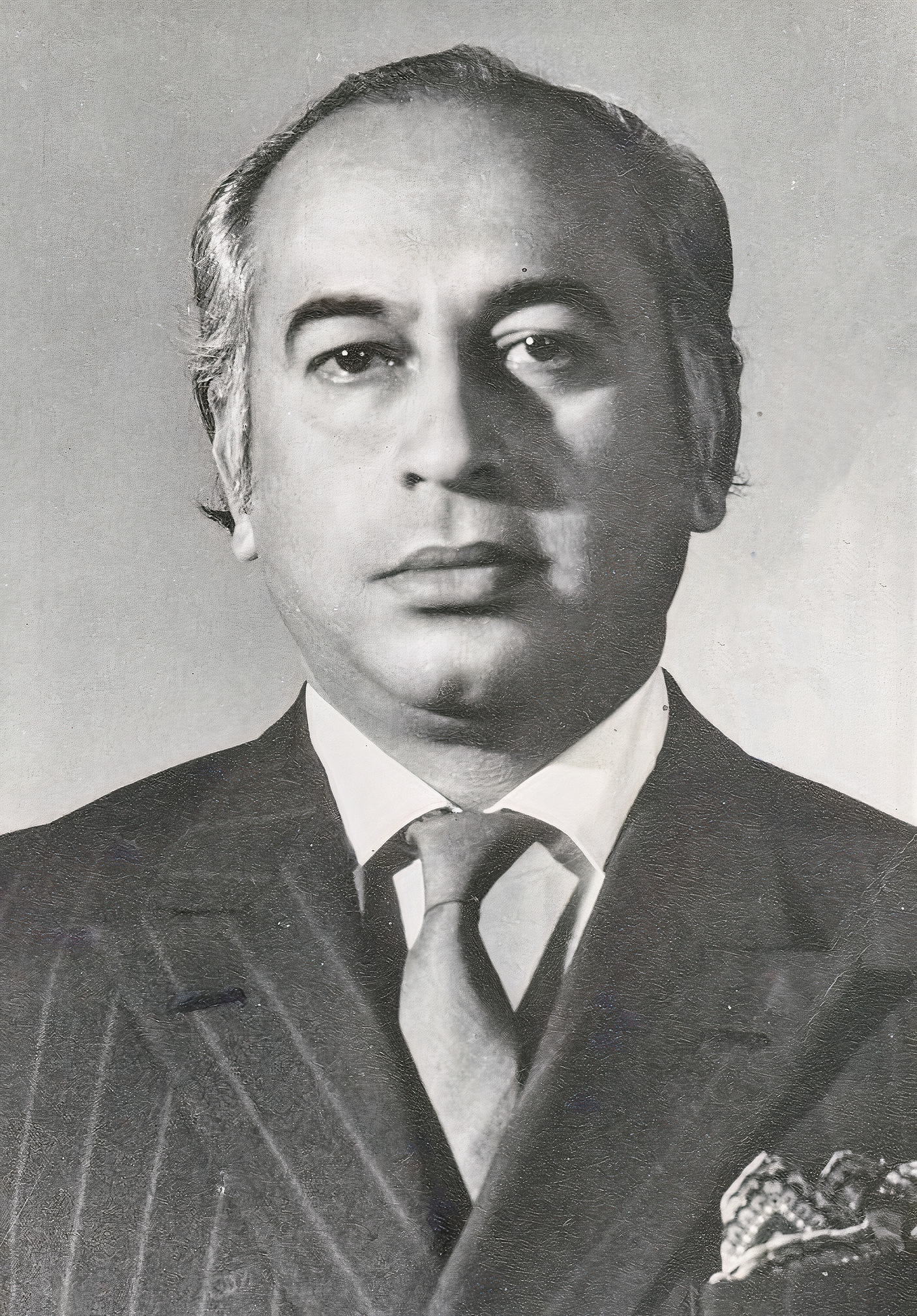
Zulfikar Ali Bhutto, leader of the Islamic socialist party Pakistan Peoples Party, announced his party's participation in the by-election.

On 22 September 1971, during a press conference in Karachi, Pakistan People's Party (PPP) Chairman Zulfikar Ali Bhutto confirmed that his party would participate in the by-election.

He urged for the transfer of power through the by-election and warned that failure to do so could result in his party taking control of Pakistan through armed revolution.

On 24 September, during a central committee meeting in Quetta, Balochistan, the PPP formed a nine-member delegation committee to oversee the election campaign.

On 10 October 1971, PPP Secretary-General Mian Mahmud Ali Kasuri stated that the party would invite elected politicians from the banned All Pakistan Awami League to join PPP or offer them support in the by-election.

On 12 October, PPP Information Secretary Kausar Niazi announced that 52 candidates had applied to contest the by-election for the National Assembly under the PPP banner.

Later, the PPP officially announced its intention to contest 8–10 seats in the National Assembly by-election.

On 26 October, Mian Mahmud Ali Kasuri called for applications for the Provincial Assembly by-election nominations to be submitted to him at Hotel Intercontinental in Dhaka by 30 October.

=== Others ===
On 22 August, Khaja Nazir Ahmed, Secretary-General of the Progressive Peoples Party’s Karachi branch, stated that due to pressure from party workers, the party would send a delegation to East Pakistan to assess the feasibility of participating in the by-election.

On 30 August, Asghar Khan, leader of Tehreek-e-Istiqlal, demanded that the by-election be held within seven days as part of his five-point demand.

On 30 September, as the head of the Ganotantric Oikko Andolon (Democratic Unity Movement), Asghar Khan stated that his party would consider participating in the by-election if the general amnesty was expanded to cover more of the previously elected candidates and if the government accepted his five-point formula.

On 17 October, Zahiruddin of the banned All Pakistan Awami League stated that since his party was outlawed, there was no question of its participation in the by-election. However, he mentioned that individual members could contest as independent candidates. Additionally, he confirmed that none of the party members had expressed interest in forming a new party or joining another political group.

On the same day, it was reported that Bhashani's National Awami Party would not participate in the by-election. However, the party allowed its members to run as independent candidates.

On 24 November 1971, A.B.M. Nurul Islam, a member of the banned All Pakistan Awami League, met with President Yahya Khan in Islamabad and requested the lifting of the ban on his party.

On 26 November, the Pakistani government banned the National Awami Party (Wali), although its elected representatives in West Pakistan were not declared illegal.

On 27 November, ABM Nurul Islam of the banned All Pakistan Awami League stated that he believed his party's elected members of the National and Provincial Assemblies would remain independent and not join any other party. He also mentioned that after the implementation of a new constitution, they would unite and select a new leader for themselves.

== Nominations and results ==
On 28 September 1971, an amendment to the Legal Framework Order, 1970 was introduced, allowing members of the national and provincial cabinets to contest elections without resigning from their positions.

On 10 November 1971, President Yahya Khan issued the "National and Provincial Assemblies (Elections) (Amendment) Ordinance." According to this ordinance, any candidate could withdraw their candidacy up to four days before the election.

As in the previous elections, political parties retained their existing election symbols for this by-election.

Initially, 29 September 1971 was set as the deadline for submitting nomination papers.

=== National Assembly seats ===
On 9 October, the deadline for submitting nomination papers for the National Assembly by-election was set for 20 October.

By 21 October, a total of 192 candidates had submitted nomination papers for 75 out of 78 seats in the National Assembly.

On 22 October, 15 candidates were elected unopposed to the National Assembly.

On 23 October, another 3 candidates were elected unopposed.

By 28 October, according to a provisional government announcement, a total of 31 candidates had been elected unopposed in the National Assembly by-election.

On 29 October, another 19 candidates were declared elected unopposed, leaving the results of 5 seats still unknown at that time.

On 30 October, 2 more candidates were declared elected unopposed, bringing the total to 52.

Meanwhile, independent National Assembly candidate M. A. Wahab from Jessore joined the Qayyum Muslim League.

The Six-Party United Front revised its candidate list, replacing Mukhlesur Rahman Chowdhury with Syed Khwaja Khairuddin for NE-30 Rajshahi-1.

Additionally, Ali Amjad Khan withdrew his nomination from NE-32 Comilla-2.

By 2 November, reports indicated that candidates in 55 out of 78 National Assembly seats in East Pakistan had been elected unopposed.

On 9 November, it was reported that a total of 58 candidates, including 6 more in the National Assembly, had been elected unopposed. Among them, 53 belonged to the Six-Party United Front, while 5 were from the Pakistan Peoples Party.

==== National Assembly candidates elected unopposed ====
Between 22 October and 9 November, the Election Commission announced the names of the candidates elected unopposed to the National Assembly:

Constituency	Party	Member
NE-2 (Rangpur-2)	Pakistan Peoples Party	Syed Kamal Hossain Rizvi
NE-9 (Rangpur-9)	Pakistan Peoples Party	Raisuddin Ahmed
NE-10 (Rangpur-10)	Qayyum Muslim League	Saidur Rahman
NE-11 (Rangpur-11)	Jamaat-e-Islami Pakistan	Zabanuddin Ahmed
NE-14 (Dinajpur-2)	Jamaat-e-Islami Pakistan	Tamizuddin
NE-15 (Dinajpur-3)	Jamaat-e-Islami Pakistan	Abdullah Al Kafi
NE-17 (Dinajpur-5)	Pakistan Peoples Party	Kamruzzaman
NE-19 (Bogra-1)	Jamaat-e-Islami Pakistan	Abbas Ali Khan
NE-20 (Bogra-2)	Pakistan Democratic Party	Masihul Islam
NE-26 (Pabna-3)	Convention Muslim League	M. A. Matin
NE-28 (Pabna-5)	Qayyum Muslim League	Syed Asgar Hossain Jaidi
NE-29 (Pabna-6)	Jamaat-e-Islami Pakistan	Abdus Subhan
NE-32 (Rajshahi-3)	Qayyum Muslim League	Jasimuddin Ahmed
NE-33 (Rajshahi-4)	Pakistan Democratic Party	Mumtaz Uddin Ahmed
NE-35 (Rajshahi-6)	Jamaat-e-Islami Pakistan	Afazuddin Ahmed
NE-36 (Rajshahi-7)	Council Muslim League	Abdus Sattar Khan Chowdhury
NE-39 (Kushtia-1)	Qayyum Muslim League	Afil Uddin
NE-40 (Kushtia-2)	Jamaat-e-Islami Pakistan	Sad Ahmed
NE-41 (Kushtia-3)	Jamaat-e-Islami Pakistan	Abdul Matin
NE-42 (Kushtia-4)	Council Muslim League	Azmat Ali
NE-43 (Jessore-1)	Pakistan Democratic Party	M. A. Rashid
NE-44 (Jessore-2)	Council Muslim League	Syed Shamsur Rahman
NE-45 (Jessore-3)	Qayyum Muslim League	Abdul Wahab
NE-46 (Jessore-4)	Nezame Islam Party	Khaja Mohammad Shah
NE-51 (Khulna-2)	Jamaat-e-Islami Pakistan	A. K. M. Yusuf
NE-53 (Khulna-4)	Qayyum Muslim League	Khan-e-Sabur
NE-58 (Bakerganj-1)	Pakistan Democratic Party	Syed Azizul Haque
NE-60 (Bakerganj-3)	Pakistan Peoples Party	Shamsuddin Ahmed
NE-62 (Bakerganj-5)	Convention Muslim League	Abdur Rab
NE-63 (Bakerganj-6)	Nezame Islam Party	Shah Matiur Rahman
NE-66 (Bakerganj-9)	Jamaat-e-Islami Pakistan	Abdur Rahim
NE-71 (Tangail-1)	Jamaat-e-Islami Pakistan	Ghulam Azam
NE-73 (Tangail-3)	Convention Muslim League	Abdul Hannan
NE-75 (Tangail-5)	Jamaat-e-Islami Pakistan	A. Khalek
NE-78 (Mymensingh-3)	Jamaat-e-Islami Pakistan	S. M. Yusuf Ali
NE88 (Mymensingh-10)	Nezame Islam Party	Manjurul Haque
NE91 (Mymensingh-16)	Qayyum Muslim League	Mujibur Rahman
NE92 (Mymensingh-17)	Pakistan Democratic Party	Syed Mosleh Uddin
NE97 (Faridpur-4)	Convention Muslim League	Abdur Rahman
NE99 (Faridpur-6)	Pakistan Democratic Party	Anisuzzaman Chowdhury
NE107 (Dhaka-4)	Pakistan Peoples Party	Akram Hossain Khan
NE108 (Dhaka-5)	Jamaat-e-Islami Pakistan	Yusuf Ali
NE113 (Dhaka-10)	Convention Muslim League	Mohammad Shahidullah
NE117 (Dhaka-14)	Council Muslim League	Syed Khwaja Khairuddin
NE120 (Sylhet-1)	Pakistan Democratic Party	Nasiruddin
NE121 (Sylhet-2)	Nezame Islam Party	Syed Kamrul Ahsan
NE122 (Sylhet-3)	Pakistan Democratic Party	Fazlul Haque
NE123 (Sylhet-4)	Convention Muslim League	Haji Habibur Rahman Chowdhury
NE127 (Sylhet-8)	Independent Politician	Mahmud Ali
NE131 (Comilla-1)	Nezame Islam Party	Ashraf Ali
NE132 (Comilla-2)	Council Muslim League	A. Q. M. Shafiqul Islam
NE135 (Comilla-5)	Independent Politician	Sajedul Haque
NE143 (Comilla-12)	Pakistan Democratic Party	Dalilur Rahman
NE144 (Comilla-14)	Nezame Islam Party	Abdul Haque
NE146 (Noakhali-2)	Pakistan Democratic Party	Abdul Jabbar Khaddar
NE147 (Noakhali-3)	Council Muslim League	Saidul Haque
NE150 (Noakhali-6)	Jamaat-e-Islami Pakistan	Md. Shafiqullah
NE151 (Noakhali-7)	Convention Muslim League	Abu Sufian
NE153 (Chittagong-1)	Pakistan Democratic Party	Mohammad Nurullah

=== Provincial seats ===
On October 9, the nomination submission date for the first phase of the provincial council by-elections was announced as October 20, and for the second phase, it was set for November 1. Additionally, it was reported that for the first phase of the provincial by-elections, 310 nomination papers were submitted for 93 seats, excluding 12.

On October 23, 10 candidates were elected unopposed to the provincial council. On October 28, the nomination withdrawal deadline for the provincial by-elections was extended by two days.

On October 29, the six-party alliance nominated two candidates for the provincial council, replaced a candidate in the Faridpur-13 seat, and withdrew Mansur Ali from the Dhaka-21 seat due to personal reasons. On October 30, all candidates from PE-36 Kushtia-6 withdrew their nominations. On the same day, 35 candidates were declared elected unopposed in the first phase of the provincial elections.

On October 31, 11 more candidates were elected unopposed to the provincial council. On November 1, nomination papers were received for 88 seats in the second phase of the provincial elections.

On November 2, it was reported that elections for 17 provincial council seats would be held in December, while 46 candidates had already been elected unopposed. On November 3, another 30 candidates were declared elected unopposed in the provincial council elections.

On November 4, five more candidates were elected unopposed to the provincial council. On November 8, 10 more candidates were elected unopposed. On November 5, five candidates were declared elected unopposed, while the six-party alliance announced six new candidates.

On November 9, it was reported that in the by-elections, a total of 108 candidates, including 12 from provincial seats, were elected unopposed. Among them, 102 were from the six-party alliance, while one was from the Pakistan People's Party.

==== Unopposedly elected provincial candidates ====
From October 23 to November 9, the Election Commission announced the names of the candidates elected unopposed to the National Assembly:

Seat	Party	Member
PE5 (Rangpur-5)	Jamaat-e-Islami Pakistan	Shah Mohammad Ruhul Amin
PE7 (Rangpur-7)	Independent Politician	Abul Hossain Mia
PE11 (Rangpur-11)	Convention Muslim League	Akmal Hossain
PE13 (Rangpur-13)	Council Muslim League	Ahmad Ali Sarkar
PE14 (Rangpur-14)	Convention Muslim League	Panir Uddin Ahmed
PE15 (Rangpur-15)	Council Muslim League	Abul Kasem
PE23 (Dinajpur-1)	Jamaat-e-Islami Pakistan	Ismail Haq
PE24 (Dinajpur-2)	Jamaat-e-Islami Pakistan	Md. Shafiur Rahman
PE27 (Dinajpur-5)	Jamaat-e-Islami Pakistan	Abdul Bashir Mia
PE28 (Dinajpur-6)	Nezam-e-Islam Party	Mahbubul Alam
PE29 (Dinajpur-7)	Nezam-e-Islam Party	Ishaq Ali Khan
PE30 (Dinajpur-8)	Independent Politician	Abdul Wadud
PE31 (Dinajpur-9)	Convention Muslim League	Nurul Huda Chowdhury
PE33 (Bogra-1)	Convention Muslim League	Abdul Alim
PE42 (Rajshahi-1)	Council Muslim League	Ertaj Alam
PE43 (Rajshahi-2)	Jamaat-e-Islami Pakistan	Meem Obaidullah
PE44 (Rajshahi-3)	Jamaat-e-Islami Pakistan	Md. Taiyeb Ali
PE49 (Rajshahi-8)	Nezam-e-Islam Party	Farajuddin Molla
PE51 (Rajshahi-10)	Qayyum Muslim League	Z. A. M. Yusuf Khan
PE52 (Rajshahi-11)	Pakistan Democratic Party	Abdus Subhan
PE53 (Rajshahi-12)	Qayyum Muslim League	N. A. M. Farooq
PE54 (Rajshahi-13)	Convention Muslim League	Aynuddin
PE56 (Rajshahi-15)	Jamaat-e-Islami Pakistan	Kachuddin
PE60 (Pabna-2)	Qayyum Muslim League	Golam Azam Talukdar
PE61 (Pabna-3)	Jamaat-e-Islami Pakistan	Korban Ali
PE66 (Pabna-8)	Council Muslim League	Mofazzal Ali
PE70 (Pabna-12)	Nezam-e-Islam Party	Mohammad Ishaq
PE71 (Kushtia-1)	Jamaat-e-Islami Pakistan	Nurul Islam
PE72 (Kushtia-2)	Qayyum Muslim League	Yakub Ali
PE73 (Kushtia-3)	Independent Politician	Mohammad Hanif
PE74 (Kushtia-4)	Jamaat-e-Islami Pakistan	Abdul Qayyum
PE75 (Kushtia-5)	Council Muslim League	Khaleduzzaman
PE77 (Kushtia-7)	Council Muslim League	Nawazesh Ahmed
PE78 (Jessore-1)	Jamaat-e-Islami Pakistan	Nurunnabi
PE79 (Jessore-2)	Jamaat-e-Islami Pakistan	Abu Nasar Md. Ansar Uddin
PE80 (Jessore-3)	Jamaat-e-Islami Pakistan	A. S. M. Mozammel Haque
PE82 (Jessore-5)	Council Muslim League	Tabibur Rahman Khan
PE83 (Jessore-6)	Qayyum Muslim League	Abdur Rashid
PE85 (Jessore-8)	Jamaat-e-Islami Pakistan	Masihul Azam
PE88 (Jessore-11)	Jamaat-e-Islami Pakistan	Abul Khair
PE89 (Jessore-12)	Convention Muslim League	Kazi Abdul Latif
PE98 (Khulna-8)	Qayyum Muslim League	Hafizur Rahman
PE109 (Patuakhali-5)	Convention Muslim League	A. M. Sharafuddin
PE110 (Patuakhali-6)	Qayyum Muslim League	Md. Lutfar Rahman
PE119 (Bakerganj-8)	Pakistan Democratic Party	Abdul Aziz Talukdar
PE120 (Bakerganj-9)	Nezam-e-Islam Party	Abdul Matin
PE121 (Bakerganj-10)	Pakistan Democratic Party	A. K. Fazlul Haque Chowdhury
PE124 (Bakerganj-13)	Qayyum Muslim League	Abdul Jalil Khan
PE130 (Tangail-1)	Council Muslim League	Fazlur Rahman Talukdar
PE133 (Tangail-4)	Jamaat-e-Islami Pakistan	Shahidullah Khan Yusufzai
PE134 (Tangail-5)	Convention Muslim League	Hakim Habibur Rahman
PE136 (Tangail-6)	Pakistan Democratic Party	Hafizuddin Ahmad
PE140 (Mymensingh-2)	Pakistan Democratic Party	Nuruzzaman
PE144 (Mymensingh-6)	Convention Muslim League	Shamsul Haque
PE147 (Mymensingh-9)	Council Muslim League	Hasmat Ali
PE149 (Mymensingh-11)	Pakistan Democratic Party	A. F. M. Nazmul Huda
PE158 (Mymensingh-20)	Nezam-e-Islam Party	Ali Osman
PE167 (Mymensingh-29)	Convention Muslim League	Lokman Hakim
PE175 (Dhaka-8)	Pakistan People's Party	M. A. Shikdar
PE176 (Dhaka-6)	Independent Politician	Moher Ali Khan
PE182 (Dhaka-12)	Council Muslim League	Sirajuddin
PE187 (Dhaka-17)	Qayyum Muslim League	Asgar Hossain
PE191 (Dhaka-21)	Pakistan Democratic Party	Obaidul Kabir
PE192 (Dhaka-22)	Qayyum Muslim League	Sultan Uddin Khan
PE199 (Dhaka-19)	Independent Politician	Saifur Rahman
PE205 (Faridpur-5)	Jamaat-e-Islami Pakistan	Alauddin Khan
PE207 (Faridpur-7)	Jamaat-e-Islami Pakistan	Syed Mohammad Ali
PE210 (Faridpur-10)	Qayyum Muslim League	A. Q. M. Zainal Abedin
PE212 (Faridpur-12)	Convention Muslim League	Sharafat Hossain
PE221 (Sylhet-2)	Pakistan Democratic Party	Abdul Khaleq
PE223 (Sylhet-3)	Jamaat-e-Islami Pakistan	Abdul Matin
PE224 (Sylhet-5)	Convention Muslim League	Nazmul Hossain Khan
PE229 (Sylhet-10)	Nezam-e-Islam Party	Habibur Rahman
PE231 (Sylhet-12)	Jamaat-e-Islami Pakistan	Gaus Uddin
PE242 (Comilla-2)	Pakistan Democratic Party	Syed A. B. M. Obaidullah
PE243 (Comilla-3)	Jamaat-e-Islami Pakistan	Abdul Gani Munshi
PE244 (Comilla-4)	Pakistan Democratic Party	Shafiqul Rahman
PE245 (Comilla-5)	Pakistan Democratic Party	A. K. Rafiqul Hossain
PE247 (Comilla-7)	Pakistan Democratic Party	Arfan Ali
PE250 (Comilla-10)	Convention Muslim League	Mobarak Ali Sarkar
PE258 (Comilla-18)	Convention Muslim League	Abdul Hakim
PE261 (Comilla-21)	Qayyum Muslim League	Mujibur Rahman
PE262 (Comilla-22)	Council Muslim League	Mir A. Razzak
PE266 (Comilla-26)	Jamaat-e-Islami Pakistan	Mohsenuzzaman Chowdhury
PE272 (Noakhali-6)	Convention Muslim League	Sirajul Islam
PE275 (Noakhali-9)	Pakistan Democratic Party	Siddiqullah Chowdhury
PE276 (Noakhali-10)	Pakistan Democratic Party	Emdadul Haque
PE277 (Noakhali-11)	Jamaat-e-Islami Pakistan	A. B. M. Mahiyuddin Chowdhury
PE268 (Noakhali-2)	Qayyum Muslim League	Ibrahim Hossain
PE269 (Noakhali-3)	Nezam-e-Islam Party	Abul Khair
PE270 (Noakhali-4)	Convention Muslim League	Khaiz Ahmad Bhuiyan
PE274 (Noakhali-8)	Nezam-e-Islam Party	Abdul Matin
PE278 (Noakhali-12)	Jamaat-e-Islami Pakistan	Fayez Ahmad Mia
PE279 (Noakhali-13)	Jamaat-e-Islami Pakistan	Abdul Wadud
PE (Bogra-)	Convention Muslim League	Abdul Gani
PE (Bakerganj-)	Convention Muslim League	Akhtar Uddin Ahmad
PE (Bakerganj-)	Jamaat-e-Islami Pakistan	Fazlur Rahman
PE (Bakerganj-)	Convention Muslim League	Sardar Sultan Mahmud
PE (Faridpur-)	Pakistan Democratic Party	Tofazzal Hossain
PE (Faridpur-)	Pakistan Democratic Party	Khondaker Abdul Hamid
PE (Faridpur-)	Pakistan Democratic Party	Kazi Mokhlesur Rahman
PE (Faridpur-)	Pakistan Democratic Party	Md. Soleman Ukil
PE (Faridpur-)	Jamaat-e-Islami Pakistan	Khondaker Mohiuddin
PE (Dhaka-)	Pakistan Democratic Party	Nurul Islam Chowdhury
PE (Comilla-)	Council Muslim League	M. A. Salam
PE (Chittagong-)	Nezam-e-Islam Party	Abdul Monaim
PE (Mymensingh-)	Nezam-e-Islam Party	M. A. Gani

=== Controversy, irregularities, and conflict ===
Former Convention Muslim League member Kazi Abdul Kader described the organization of the by-elections as unthinkable given the circumstances and proposed a settlement with the winners of the previous elections. He argued that many opportunists would participate in the by-elections.

Kausar Niazi alleged that although the Pakistan People's Party (PPP) had planned to field candidates in 20-30 National Assembly seats, due to threats from the Razakars, only seven candidates were able to submit nomination papers by October 21. He claimed that while candidates from the Six-Party Alliance were provided security, no such measures were taken for his party's candidates.

Mian Mahmud Ali Kasuri accused the Mukti Bahini and the Six-Party Alliance of creating security risks for PPP candidates through threats. He warned that if such conditions persisted, the party might have to reconsider its participation in the by-elections.

Upon learning about preparations for the by-elections, Mukti Bahini guerrillas detonated a bomb on November 1 at the provincial office of the Election Commission in Momenbagh, near Dhaka's Outer Circular Road.

On November 6, Abdul Qayyum Khan proposed advancing the election date, citing acts of sabotage.

On November 7, Sultan Uddin Khan, a newly elected unopposed provincial council member from PE192 Dhaka-22 and a member of the Qayyum Muslim League, was assassinated by an unknown gunman.

In NE99 Faridpur-6, despite the presence of multiple candidates, Anisuzzaman Chowdhury was declared elected unopposed. In protest, another candidate, Sardar Abdul Motaleb of the Six-Party Alliance, submitted a complaint to the Election Commission along with his candidacy documents.

Pakistan People's Party leader Khursheed Hasan Mir criticized Six-Party Alliance leader Nurul Amin for calling on independent and opposition candidates to withdraw from the elections. Mir claimed that the alliance was afraid of a real electoral contest and was pressuring PPP candidates to withdraw their nominations.

Ahmad Ali Mondal, the Six-Party Alliance candidate for NE107 Dhaka-4, alleged that despite not withdrawing from the election, the Election Commission declared Pakistan People's Party candidate Akram Hossain Khan elected unopposed in his constituency.

== Aftermath ==
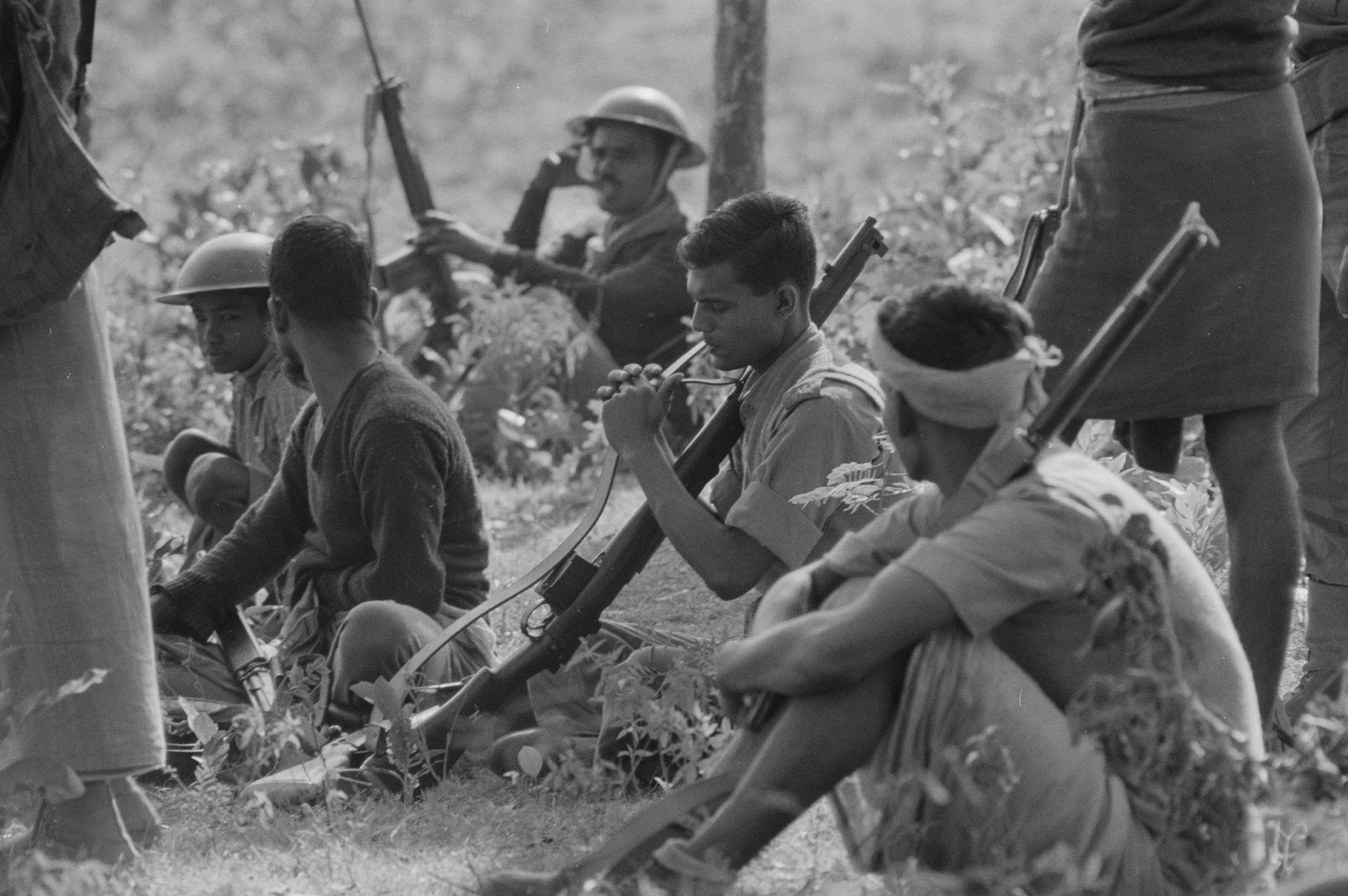
Members of the Mitro Bahini in western East Pakistan during the Indo-Pakistani War of 1971.

On 23 November, 1971, in response to India's undeclared military offensive along the border of East Pakistan, a state of emergency was declared across Pakistan.

On November 26, an election schedule was announced for 20 National Assembly seats and 71 Provincial Assembly seats in East Pakistan.

On December 3, India launched an attack on West Pakistan, initiating the Indo-Pakistani War of 1971.

Following this, the Pakistan Election Commission postponed the by-elections on December 6, stating that new election dates would be announced later.

The next day, Nurul Amin was appointed as the Prime Minister of Pakistan.

On December 16, the Pakistan Army surrendered in Dhaka to the Mitro Bahini, leading to the independence of East Pakistan as Bangladesh.

On December 20, following the Rebellion of Majors and Colonels, Yahya Khan was removed from power, and Zulfikar Ali Bhutto became the new leader of Pakistan.

Six days after the Pakistani surrender, the Government of Bangladesh relocated from Kolkata, India, to Dhaka and officially began its operations.

Meanwhile, on December 23, Zulfikar Ali Bhutto annulled the by-elections and their results.

On 7 January, 1972, under Bhutto's orders, Sheikh Mujibur Rahman was released from Pakistan.

On January 12, Sheikh Mujibur Rahman resigned as President of the Provisional Government of Bangladesh and became the Prime Minister of the People's Republic of Bangladesh.

Later, Bangladesh formed the Constituent Assembly of Bangladesh with the members elected in the 1970 National and Provincial Assembly elections to draft a new constitution.

On 10 April, 1973, Pakistan adopted a new constitution in the National Assembly, and on 14 August, 1973, Zulfikar Ali Bhutto became the Prime Minister of Pakistan.
