= 1970 Pakistani general election in Balochistan =

Pakistani election

7 December 1970	1977 →
- Turnout: 40.55
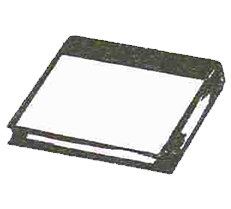
	NAP-W
Party	NAP(W)	Jamiat Ulema-e-Islam
Popular vote	1,68,804	74,651
Percentage	43.54%	19.25%
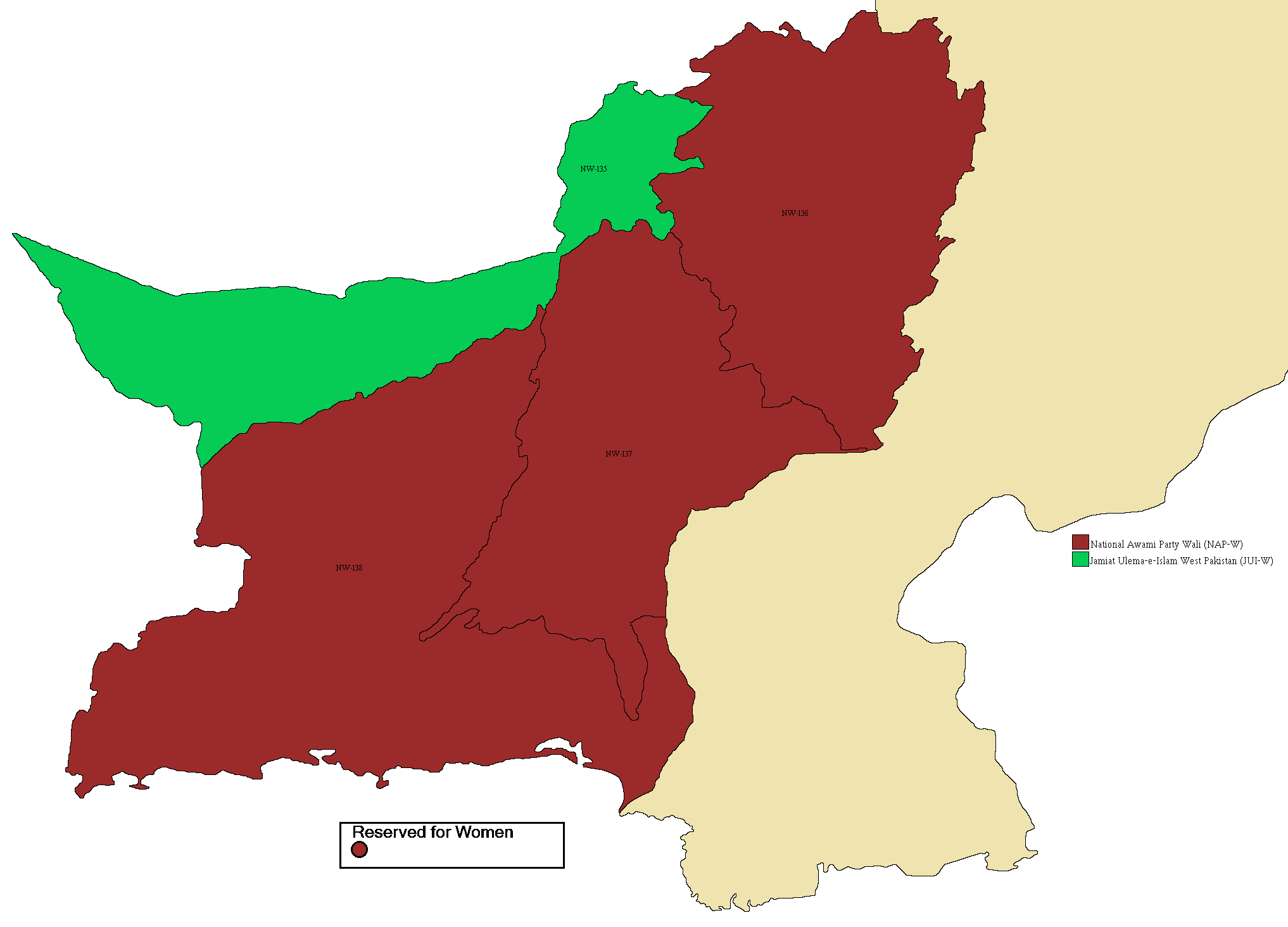

General Elections were held in Balochistan on Monday 7 December 1970 to elect five members to the 5th National Assembly of Pakistan. Of the five National Assembly seats, four were general seats and one was reserved for women.

National Awami Party (Wali) emerged as the majority party in Balochistan by winning four seats, including the seat reserved for women. Jamiat Ulema-e-Islam (West Pakistan) won the other remaining seat and became the second largest party.

== Result ==
Vote Share of different parties in the election.
1. NAP-Wali (43.54%)
2. JUI-WP (19.25%)
3. CML (10.58%)
4. PML (Qayyum) (10.53%)
5. PPP (2.29%)
6. JI (1.12%)
7. Other Parties (2.4%)
8. IND (6.55%)
Seat Share of different parties in the election.
1. NAP-Wali (75%)
2. JUI-WP (25%)

Party	Votes	%	Seats		
Party	Votes	%	General	Woman	Total
National Awami Party (Wali)	168,804	45.23	3	1	4
Jamiat Ulema-e-Islam	74,651	20.00	1	0	1
Council Muslim League	41,030	10.99	0	0	0
Pakistan Muslim League (Qayyum)	40,827	10.94	0	0	0
Pakistan Peoples Party	8,869	2.38	0	0	0
Jamaat-e-Islami Pakistan	4,331	1.16	0	0	0
Other parties	9,323	2.50	0	0	0
Independents	25,405	6.81	0	0	0
Total	373,240	100.00	4	1	5
Valid votes	373,240	96.27			
Invalid/blank votes	14,477	3.73			
Total votes	387,717	100.00			
Registered voters/turnout	956,045	40.55			
Source: Election Pakistani

== By constituency ==
	Assembly Constituency	Winner				Runner-up				Margin		Turnout
	Assembly Constituency	Candidate	Party	Votes		Candidate	Party	Votes		Margin		Turnout
	Assembly Constituency	Candidate	Party	No.	%	Candidate	Party	No.	%	No.	%	%
1	NW-135 Quetta-I	Molvi Abdul Haq	JUI-WP	32,065	43.51	Mir M. Younas	IND	20,226	27.44	11,839	16.07	34.38
2	NW-136 Quetta-II	Khair Bakhsh Mari	NAP-Wali	106,913	61.22	Mir Taj M. Khan Jamali	CML	34,672	19.85	72,241	41.37	52.75
3	NW-137 Kalat-I	Dr. Abdul Hayee Baloch	NAP-Wali	32,561	45.16	M. Umar	JUI-WP	15,765	21.86	16,796	23.30	33.00
4	NW-138 Kalat-II	Mir Ghous Bakhsh Bazanjo	NAP-Wali	29,330	43.60	Shahzada Mohyuddin	PML (Qayyum)	22,866	33.99	6,464	9.61	35.01
