= Akhtaruddin Ahmad =

Bangladeshi politician

- আখতার উদ্দিন আহমদ

Minister of Commerce and Industry
- In office 17 September 1971 – 14 December 1971
- Governor: Abdul Motaleb Malik

Member of the National Assembly of Pakistan
- In office 1962–1965
- Succeeded by: Master Abdul Aziz
- Constituency: NE-21 (Bakerganj-IV)

Personal details
- Born: 1930 Backergunge District, Bengal Presidency, British India
- Party: Convention Muslim League
- Education: University of Dacca; Brojomohun College
- Occupation: Politician

Akhtaruddin Ahmad (Bengali: আখতার উদ্দিন আহমদ; born 1930) was an East Pakistani barrister and politician. He was a member of the 3rd National Assembly of Pakistan and later moved to Saudi Arabia.

== Biography ==
Akhtaruddin Ahmad was born in 1930 in Nabagram, Backergunge District, Bengal Presidency, British India (present-day Jhalokathi District, Bangladesh). After obtaining his bachelor's with honors from Brojomohun College, Barisal, he enrolled at the University of Dacca. There, in 1952, he completed his post-graduation in political science—the same year he became a member of the Constituent Assembly of Pakistan—and later, in 1954, earned a postgraduate degree in law. During this period, he served as president of the East Pakistan Muslim Students' League. In 1958, he returned to the country as a barrister from Britain and began practicing law at the Dacca High Court. He was a member of the 3rd National Assembly of Pakistan, representing Bakerganj-4. He was affiliated with the Convention Muslim League and served as its vice-president, as well as president of the Pakistan Peasants and Workers Confederation. During the Bangladesh Liberation War in 1971, he was appointed as commerce and industry minister in the Malik ministry of East Pakistan. After Bangladesh gained independence, on 24 December 1971, the Government of Bangladesh arrested him for collaborating with Pakistan during the war. He was released on 30 November 1973 after the government declared a general amnesty for detained cabinet members. Later, he moved to Saudi Arabia, where he began working as a legal advisor for Saudia.
