= Nawajesh Ahmed =

- নওয়াজেস আহমদ

Food and Agriculture Minister of East Pakistan
- In office 17 September 1971 – 14 December 1971
- Governor: Abdul Motaleb Malik
- Administrator: A. A. K. Niazi
- Preceded by: Q. M. Rahman
- Succeeded by: dissolved

Member of the East Bengal Legislative Assembly for Chuadanga
- In office 14 August 1947 – 12 March 1954
- Leader: Khawaja Nazimuddin; Nurul Amin
- Preceded by: himself
- Succeeded by: dissolved

Member of the Bengal Legislative Assembly for Nadia East
- In office 23 April 1946 – 14 August 1947
- Leader: Huseyn Shaheed Suhrawardy; Khawaja Nazimuddin
- Preceded by: Aftab Hossain Joardar
- Succeeded by: himself

Personal details
- Born: 1916 Nadia district, Bengal Presidency, British India
- Died: 13 March 2000 (aged 83–84) Chuadanga, Bangladesh
- Party: BML
- Other political affiliations: CML (1962–1971); PML (1947–1962); AIML (pre-1947)
- Education: B.A., LL.M
- Alma mater: Majdia Rail Bazar High School; Krishnagar Government College; University of Calcutta
- Occupation: Lawyer

Nawajesh Ahmed (1916–2000) was a lawyer, politician, and civil servant. He served as food and agriculture minister of the then East Pakistan during the Bangladesh Liberation War in 1971.

== Early life ==
Ahmed was born in 1916 in Shyamnagar, Ranaghat, Nadia district in the Bengal Presidency of British India. After passing the matriculation examination from Majdia Rail Bazar High School in 1928, he passed the intermediate examination two years later from Krishnagar Government College and obtained his bachelor's degree. He then earned his B.A. and a LL.M. degrees from Ripon College.

== Career ==
He began practicing as a lawyer at the Ranaghat court from 1938. In the 1946 Bengal Legislative Assembly election, he participated as a politician of the All-India Muslim League and elected as a member of the legislative assembly from the Nadia East constituency. Before the partition of India, he relocated with his family to Chuadanga subdivision's Bastupur in Nadia district (which later became part of Kushtia District). After the independence of Pakistan in 1947, he served as the first chairman of Kushtia District in the newly formed province of East Bengal (part of Pakistan), president of the Kushtia District School Board, and joint secretary of Pakistan Muslim League parliamentary group. In the 1960s, he became a member of the Council Muslim League. During the Bangladesh Liberation War in 1971, he was appointed as a minister in the Malik ministry. After the independence of Bangladesh, on 24 December 1971, he was arrested by the government for collaborating with Pakistan during the war. On 30 November 1973, the government announced a general amnesty for detained cabinet members, and he was released. later, he served as the vice-president of the Bangladesh Muslim League. He worked at the Chuadanga court and was elected president of the Chuadanga Bar Association.

== Personal life and death ==
His father's name was Monir Uddin. He had a zamindari estate comprising nine villages in Chuadanga. He was awarded the title of Khan Sahib by the British authorities, which he renounced in 1946 at the call of Mohammad Ali Jinnah, leader of the All-India Muslim League. Among his three sons and two daughters, the eldest son served as the chairman of the Housing and Public Works Department. His residence was situated at Court Road in Chuadanga, where he died on 13 March 2000.
