= Mujibar Rahman =

Lawyer and politician

Mujibar Rahman was a lawyer and politician who served as the founding principal of Comilla Law College. In 1971, he took office as the information minister in the Malik ministry, the last cabinet of East Pakistan.

== Biography ==
Mujibar Rahman was born in Hajiganj Upazila of Chandpur District in present-day Bangladesh. He was active in the Pakistan Movement. He began his legal career in 1951 by practicing at the Comilla court. Politically, he was a member of the Qayyum Muslim League. In 1964, he joined Comilla Law College as its founding principal. He was also a member of the Academic Council and the Faculty of Law of University of Chittagong. During the Bangladesh Liberation War in 1971, he was appointed a minister in the Malik ministry. In the 1971 by-election, he was declared unopposed from Comilla-21 constituency to the East Pakistan Provincial Assembly. After the independence of Bangladesh, he served as the president of the Bangladesh–Saudi Friendship Association.
