= AKM Yusuf =

Bangladeshi politician (1926–2014)

Mumtaz al-Muhaddethin AKM Yusuf
- এ কে এম ইউসুফ

Provincial Minister of East Pakistan
- In office 17 September 1971 – 14 December 1971
- Governor: Abdul Motaleb Malik
- Portfolio: Revenue
- Preceded by: Fakhruddin Ahmed
- Succeeded by: post abolished
- In office 17 September 1971 – 7 October 1971
- Governor: Abdul Motaleb Malik
- Portfolio: Works, Power and Irrigation
- Preceded by: Maung Shwe Prue Chowdhury
- Succeeded by: A. K. Mosharraf Hossain

Member of the Pakistan Parliament for NE-24 Bakerganj-cum-Khulna
- In office 8 June 1962 – 24 March 1965
- President: Ayub Khan
- Preceded by: constituency established
- Succeeded by: Athar Ali Khan

Personal details
- Born: Abul Kalam Muhammad Yusuf; 1926 Rajair, Bengal Presidency, British India
- Died: 9 February 2014 (aged 87–88) Shahbag, Dhaka, Bangladesh
- Party: BJI
- Other political affiliations: JIP (1952–1971)
- Education: Government Madrasah-e-Alia

Personal life
- Children: 5 daughters and 3 sons
- Education: Kamil
- Occupation: religious scholar, writer, politician

Religious life
- Denomination: Sunni
- Jurisprudence: Hanafi

Senior posting
- Teacher: Zafar Ahmad Usmani; Amimul Ehsan Barkati; Abdur Rahman Kashgari

Abul Kalam Muhammad Yusuf was a Bangladeshi Islamic scholar, hadith expert, translator, author, farmer organizer, and politician.

He served as chairman of the Bangladesh Farmers Welfare Association and as Naib-e-Ameer of the Bangladesh Jamaat-e-Islami. The International Crimes Tribunal indicted him for alleged involvement in crimes against humanity during the Bangladesh Liberation War in 1971. The prosecution at the tribunal charged him with 13 counts. He died in a hospital in February 2014 while receiving treatment in prison custody.

== Early life ==
AKM Yusuf was born in 1926 in Rajair in Sarankhola Thana, Khulna District, Bengal Presidency, British India (present-day Bagerhat District, Bangladesh). Five years after independence of Pakistan, in 1952, he obtained a Title degree from Government Madrasah-e-Alia. In the same year, he joined the Islamist political party Jamaat-e-Islami Pakistan (JIP). After completing his education, Yusuf began his professional career as an Islamic teacher while continuing his political activities. In 1957, he became the Ameer of the Khulna divisional branch of the JIP. The following year, he became the principal of Khulna Alia Madrasah. Contesting the 1962 general election, Yusuf was elected as a member of the National Assembly of Pakistan from the constituency NE-24 (Bakerganj-cum-Khulna). In 1969, he was made Joint Secretary of the JIP's East Pakistan branch. Later, he became the Deputy Ameer of the branch.

== Liberation War and later life ==
During the Bangladesh Liberation War in 1971, Yusuf joined the Peace Committee, a Pro-Pakistani organisation against Bangladesh, and became chairman of its Khulna District branch. He was opposed to the independence of Bangladesh, and in May of the same year, under his leadership, a pro-Pakistan paramilitary force called the Razakar was formed in Khulna with 96 members, whose headquarters was located in the present-day headquarters building of the Ansar Force in Khulna. He was accused of assisting the Pakistan Army during the war and ordering members of the force to commit crimes against humanity against pro-Bangladesh supporters. He was accused of attacking the homes of leaders who formed the pro-Bangladesh Songram Committee and the Mukti Bahini, an armed guerrilla force. After establishing a camp for Razakars at Rayenda Bazar, he was accused of planning military operations to loot the homes, rape, kill men and convert hindus, and kill members and collaborators of the Mukti Bahini. He was also accused of leading the Rajapur massacre. In September, he joined the last cabinet of East Pakistan and was appointed Provincial Minister of Revenue, as well as Acting Provincial Minister of Works, Power and Irrigation until October. For the by-elections scheduled to be held in December, Yusuf submitted his nomination papers from constituency NE-51 (Khulna-II) and was elected unopposed as a member of the National Assembly. Following the independence of Bangladesh, he was arrested on 24 December 1971 on allegations of collaborating with Pakistan. On 15 December 1972, a special tribunal sentenced him to life imprisonment. He was released when the government declared a general amnesty on 30 November 1973. In 1977, he founded the Bangladesh Farmers Welfare Association. After the establishment of Bangladesh Jamaat-e-Islami (BJI) in 1979, he served as its Secretary-General from 1983 to 1988 and then became its Naib-e-Ameer. Yusuf contested the 1991 Bangladeshi general election from Khulna-3 and lost. In 1992, he again became the BJI's Secretary-General. Most recently, he served as the BJI's Naib-e-Ameer.

== Trial, death, family and legacy ==
On 22 January 2013, the Investigation Agency began investigating allegations of crimes against humanity against Yusuf during the Liberation War. On 22 April of the same year, the agency submitted its report containing 15 charges. Following the submission of the investigation report, on 8 May, a formal charge sheet against him was submitted to the office of the Registrar of the International Crimes Tribunal, along with a petition for his arrest. In 12 May, he was arrested from his residence in Dhaka's Dhanmondi and sent to Dhaka Central Jail. Of the 15 charges brought by the prosecution, 7 were charges of massacre. Yusuf's lawyers applied for his immediate bail on grounds of age-related health problems. However, the prosecution opposed the bail petition, citing his political activities in this age and the seriousness of the crimes, resulting in the rejection of his bail application. Instead of granting bail, the tribunal directed the prison authorities to provide him with all medical facilities. In 1 August, 13 charges were finally brought against him. He was subsequently transferred to Kashimpur Jail. In the case against him, there were 27 prosecution witnesses and 1 defense witness. At the time, Yusuf was suffering from heart disease and age-related problems. Toward the end days of the trial, when his heart condition became critical on 9 February 2014, he was taken to Bangabandhu Sheikh Mujib Medical University (present-day Bangladesh Medical University), where he died. His lawyer Mohammad Tajul Islam accused the hospital authorities of negligence in treatment, but the hospital denied the allegation. He was buried in 11 February in the family cemetery in his village. He is widely known as the founder of the Razakar force during the Liberation War. In 2026, his name was included in the condolence motion of the first session of the 13th Jatiya Sangsad. In 25 July of the same year, his wife, Rabeya Khatun, died due to old age. The couple had 3 sons and 5 daughters.

== See also ==
- Shankharikathi massacre
- Bangladesh genocide
- Ghulam Azam
