= Muslim League schisms =

The Muslim League was established as a Muslim representative political party in British India, originally as the All India Muslim League. The All India Muslim League was the driving force behind the Pakistan Movement, which resulted in the founding of Pakistan. After independence of Pakistan in 1947, it was originally succeeded by the Muslim League which ruled the country for its first 11 years. The Muslim League was later disbanded by Pakistan's first martial law. Another "Muslim League", the Pakistan Muslim League, was later raised by Ayub Khan in 1962. The Pakistan Muslim League has since split into many factions over the years.

The party, which was initially set up in 1906 to look after the political interests of the Muslims of India, finally spearheaded the struggle for a separate homeland for them. Despite its success, the League suffered from two major weaknesses: lack of a well-defined social and economic programme, and lack of a strong party organisation.

== Schisms in the Muslim League ==
Pakistan has an unstable party system and there is a tendency among political parties to divide into factions. Because in a multi-ethnic state like Pakistan political parties are the ultimate expression of democracy, internal rifts in them have largely contributed to political instability in the country.

The first faction was created when Awami Muslim League was founded in Dhaka, the erstwhile capital of the Pakistani province of East Pakistan, in 1949 by Bengali nationalists Huseyn Shaheed Suhrawardy, Maulana Abdul Hamid Khan Bhashani and Shamsul Huq. The Awami Muslim League was established as the Bengali alternative to the domination of the Muslim League in Pakistan. The party quickly gained massive popular support in East Pakistan, and eventually led the forces of Bengali nationalism in the struggle against West Pakistan's military and political establishment.

Of all political parties in Pakistan, the Pakistan Muslim League has been most susceptible to fragmentation. It is a party whose fate has largely been controlled by outside forces rather than the party leadership or the people. In fact making and breaking of the League has been an important part of the establishment’s power strategy. Hence, not surprisingly, the League or a faction thereof remains united only when it is in power and lately the PPP-P under Zardari has become similar in many respects to the old Convention ML.

== See also ==
- All-India Muslim League
- Awami Muslim League Pakistan
- All Pakistan Muslim League
- Bangladesh Awami League
- Convention Muslim League
- Council Muslim League
- Indian Union Muslim League
- Muslim League (Pakistan)
- Muslim League (Qayyum)
- Pakistan Muslim League
- Pakistan Muslim League (F)
- Pakistan Muslim League (J)
- Pakistan Muslim League (Jinnah)
- Pakistan Muslim League (Like-Minded)
- Pakistan Muslim League (N)
- Pakistan Muslim League (Q)
- Pakistan Muslim League (Z)
