= ASM Solomon =

Bangladeshi politician

A.S.M. Solomon
- এ এস এম সোলায়মান

Member of the Bangladesh Parliament for Dhaka-30
- In office 18 February 1979 – 12 February 1982
- Leader: Shah Azizur Rahman
- Preceded by: AKM Samsuzzoha
- Succeeded by: position abolished

East Pakistan Ministry of Labor and Social Welfare Minister
- In office 30 September 1971 – 14 December 1971
- Governor: Abdul Motaleb Malik
- Administrator: A. A. K. Niazi
- Preceded by: Fazlul Bari
- Succeeded by: position abolished

Member of the Pakistan Parliament for NE-44 Dacca-VI
- In office 1965–1969
- Leader: Dewan Abdul Basith
- Preceded by: Benajir Ahmed
- Succeeded by: AKM Samsuzzoha

President of Krishak Sramik Party
- In office 1969–1997
- Preceded by: A. K. Fazlul Haq
- Succeeded by: M. A. Latif Mazumder

Personal details
- Born: 25 January 1926
- Died: 4 December 1997 (aged 71) Shaheed Suhrawardy Medical College, Dhaka, Bangladesh
- Party: KSP (1946–1997)
- Other political affiliations: NDF (1992–1997); IUF (1984–1992); BGF (1979–1984)

ASM Solomon (Bengali: এ এস এম সোলায়মান) was a Member of the 4th National Assembly of Pakistan as a representative of East Pakistan. Later he became a politician of Bangladesh Nationalist Party and a member of parliament for Dhaka-30.

== Biography ==
Solomon born on 25 January 1926. He acquired honors from the University of Dhaka. He started his political career in 1946. In 1954, he became joint secretary of the Krishak Sramik Party. After that, he was elected as party's general-secretary in 1956. From the same year, he worked as editor of a weekly newspaper named "Awaaz" for four years. In 1965, he was elected a member of the 4th National Assembly of Pakistan representing Dacca-VI and became vice president of the All-Pakistan Labour Confederation. He worked as chief whip of Pakistan National Assembly from 1965 to 1969. After 1966, he was offered to lead the Bangladesh Liberation Movement by secessionist organisation Nucleus. In 1971, he was the president of the Krishak Sramik Party. He opposed independence of Bangladesh and supported Pakistan during Bangladesh Liberation War in 1971. He became a member of East Pakistan Central Peace Committee. On 17 September 1971, he was made Labor and Social Welfare Minister of East Pakistan. After the independence of Bangladesh, the government of Bangladesh arrested him on 24 December 1971 for helping Pakistani government during war. He was released on 30 November 1973, when the government declared a general amnesty for detained cabinet members. Solomon was elected to parliament from Dhaka-30 as a Bangladesh Nationalist Party candidate in 1979 election. Around 1984, he was leader of Islamic United Front, a political alliance. After 1996, Solaiman became the chairman of National Democratic Alliance, established in 1992. He died on 4 December 1997 at Shaheed Suhrawardy Medical College, Dhaka. It was decided to bury him in Mirpur martyred intellectuals graveyard. But Muktijoddha Sangsad, Ekattorer Ghatak Dalal Nirmul Committee and Projonmo '71 opposed the decision as he was against the independence of Bangladesh. Later Solaiman was buried in Sonargaon Upazila of Narayanganj District. He had two wives and four children.
