= 1965 East Pakistan Provincial Assembly election =

- May 1965

150 of the 155 seats in the Provincial Assembly
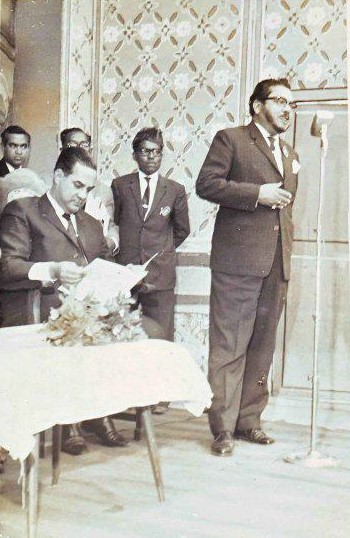

	First party	Second party
Leader	Muazzem Hussein Chowdhury	Abdul Malek Ukil
Party	PMLC	COP
Seats won	66	23

Provincial Assembly elections were held in East Pakistan in 1965 as part of the wider provincial elections.

== Background ==
The 1962 constitution provided for an indirectly elected 155-seat Provincial Assembly, of which 150 seats were elected from single-member constituencies by electoral colleges under the "basic democracy" system, and five seats reserved for women, who were elected by the 150 elected members divided into five constituencies. In East Pakistan there were 40,000 members of the electoral college.

The electoral college members were elected on 21 November 1964.

== Results ==
After around 900 potential candidates submitted nomination papers, a total of 666 candidates contested the elections, with two constituencies returning a single candidate unopposed.

Around half of the independents elected were backed by opposition parties.

Party	Votes	%	Seats
Convention Muslim League	14,144	37.99	66
All-Pakistan Awami League	5,863	15.75	11
National Awami Party	5,863	15.75	4
Council Muslim League	5,863	15.75	3
National Democratic Front	5,863	15.75	3
Jamaat-e-Islami Pakistan	5,863	15.75	1
Nizam-e-Islam Party	5,863	15.75	1
Other parties	942	2.53	0
Independents	16,284	43.74	58
Vacant			3
Total	37,233	100.00	150
Source: Al-Mujahid
