= Electoral history of Zulfikar Ali Bhutto =

Elections featuring Pakistani prime minister

This is a summary of the electoral history of Zulfikar Ali Bhutto, who served as President of Pakistan from 1971 to 1973, as Prime Minister of Pakistan from 1973 to 1977, and as founding chairman of the Pakistan Peoples Party from 1967 until his execution in 1979. He was elected to the National Assembly of Pakistan from Larkana, Lahore, Multan, Hyderabad, and Thatta in 1970, and again from Larkana in 1977.

== National Assembly elections ==
=== 1970 general election, Larkana I ===
Party	Candidate	Votes
PPP	Zulfikar Ali Bhutto	71,554
PML-C	Muhammad Ayub Khoro	31,150
JUI	Abdullah Shah	2,707
NAP-W	Dost Muhammad	905

=== 1970 general election, Lahore III ===
Party	Candidate	Votes
PPP	Zulfikar Ali Bhutto	78,132
PML-C	Doctor Javid Iqbal	33,921
PML-Masihi	Ayub	6,086
PDP	Major General (R) Sarfraz Khan	3,626
PML-Q	Ahmad Saeed Karmani	1,924
Independent	Feroz Khan	745

=== 1970 general election, Multan I ===
Party	Candidate	Votes
PPP	Zulfikar Ali Bhutto	56,360
MJUP	Moulana Hamid Ali Khan	41,886
JUI	Babu Feroze Din Ansari	29,547

=== 1970 general election, Hyderabad IV ===
Party	Candidate	Votes
PPP	Zulfikar Ali Bhutto	64,856
PML-C	Haji Naeem Ud Din Laghari	29,567
Independent	Mir Banday Ali Khan	944
SKMP	Major (R) Afzal Khan	736

=== 1970 general election, Thatta ===
Party	Candidate	Votes
PPP	Zulfikar Ali Bhutto	67,368
PML-Q	Muhammad Yousif Khan Chandio	22,696
JUI	Molvi Noor Muhammad Kutchi	5,207
JI	Ishaq Khan	768

=== 1977 general election, Larkana I ===
Bhutto was elected unopposed from NA-163 (Larkana I).

== General elections ==
=== 1970 Pakistani general election ===
Party	Votes	%	Seats
Awami League	12,937,162	39.20	160
Pakistan Peoples Party	6,148,923	18.63	81
Jamaat-e-Islami	1,989,461	6.03	4
Council Muslim League	1,965,689	5.96	7
Pakistan Muslim League (Qayyum)	1,473,749	4.47	9
Jamiat Ulema-e-Islam	1,315,071	3.98	7
Markazi Jamiat Ulema-e-Pakistan	1,299,858	3.94	7
Convention Muslim League	1,102,815	3.34	2
National Awami Party (Wali)	801,355	2.43	6
Pakistan Democratic Party	737,958	2.24	1
Jamiat Ulema-e-Islam (Thanvi)	521,764	1.58	0
Other parties	387,919	1.18	0
Independents	2,322,341	7.04	16
Seats reserved for women			13
Total	33,004,065	100.00	313
Registered voters/turnout	56,941,500	–	
Source: Nohlen et al.; Bangladesh Documents

=== 1977 Pakistani general election ===
Party	Votes	%	Seats	+/–
Pakistan Peoples Party	10,093,868	59.74	155	+74
Pakistan National Alliance	6,154,921	36.43	36	New
Pakistan Muslim League (Qayyum)	157,370	0.93	1	−8
Pakistan Pakhtunkhwa National Awami Party	48,145	0.28	0	New
Jamiat Ulema-e-Islam (Hazarvi)	7,595	0.04	0	New
Pakistan Inqlabi Mahaz	6,494	0.04	0	New
Tahafuz-e-Islam	5,206	0.03	0	New
Pakistan Worker's Party	1,716	0.01	0	New
Pakistan Socialist Party	1,060	0.01	0	New
Jammaat-e-Aalia Mujahideen	808	0.00	0	New
Independents	417,808	2.47	8	−8
Seats reserved for women			10	–
Minority seats			6	–
Total	16,894,991	100.00	216	0
Registered voters/turnout	30,899,052	–		
Source: Nohlen et al.; IPU Parline
