= Bangladesh Muslim League =

Bangladeshi political party

Bangladesh Muslim League বাংলাদেশ মুসলিম লীগ
- Abbreviation: BML
- President: Zubeida Qader Chowdhury
- Secretary-General: Kazi Abul Khair
- Founder: Abdus Sabur Khan
- Founded: 8 August 1976; 50 years ago
- Registered: 21 September 1976
- Preceded by: PMLC; CML; QML
- Headquarters: Flat - 202, House No - 24,road no - 23 Gulshan - 01, Dhaka - 1212
- Ideology: Islamic nationalism
- Political position: Right-wing
- Bangladesh Parliament: 0 / 350

Election symbol
- Lantern

Party flag

The Bangladesh Muslim League (Bengali: বাংলাদেশ মুসলিম লীগ) is a political party in Bangladesh that traces its origins to the All-India Muslim League, established in 1906.

Convention Muslim League, Council Muslim League and Qayyum Muslim League, breakaway groups of Pakistan Muslim League, were banned along with other Islamic parties after the independence of Bangladesh in 1971. It was once again legalized in 1976 when Abdus Sabur Khan united the three breakaway groups in Bangladesh and was elected president of the new party. A former leader of the party, Shah Azizur Rahman would become the Prime Minister of Bangladesh after joining the Bangladesh Nationalist Party.

== History ==
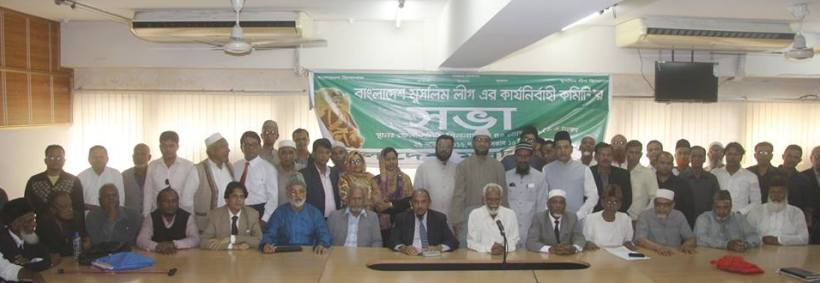
Working Committee meeting of Bangladesh Muslim League

The Bangladesh Muslim League traces its origins to the All India Muslim League of the British Raj established in 1906 in Dhaka with goals to support the Crown and to protect the Muslims of India without opposing the other groups in India.

After the Partition of India and the Independence of Pakistan in 1947, the All India Muslim League became the Pakistan Muslim League. The Pakistan Muslim League was voted into power in East Pakistan. In the 1955 elections in East Pakistan, the Muslim League lost control of the provincial legislature to the United Front. In the 1960s, the Muslim League split into two separate parties, Convention Muslim League and the Council Muslim League.

In 1971, after the Bangladesh War of Independence, East Pakistan became Bangladesh and banned all religion-based parties including Convention Muslim League, Council Muslim League and Qayyum Muslim League.

In 1976, the Political Parties Regulation Ordinance was passed which legalized three parties. These parties then combined into one and formed the Bangladesh Muslim League on 8 August 1976. Later it was granted registration on 21 September 1976.

In 1978, the Bangladesh Muslim League separated into two factions. Abdus Sabur Khan led the conservative faction of the party and Shah Azizur Rahman led the more liberal faction. Azizur Rahman joined the Bangladesh Nationalist Party soon after. The Bangladesh Muslim League, led by Abdus Sabur Khan won 20 seats in the 1979 parliamentary election, including that of the first elected female MP in Bangladesh (Syeda Razia Faiz).

After the death of Sabur Khan, the Bangladesh Muslim League divided into multiple factions. Kazi Abdul Kader later served as the president of the Bangladesh Muslim League. Two factions (the Bangladesh Muslim League and Bangladesh Muslim League - BML) still exist and are registered under the Bangladesh Election Commission.

The Bangladesh Muslim League's current president is Begum Zubeida Kader Chowdhury and the secretary general is Kazi Abul Khair.
