= Obaidullah Majumdar =

Bangladeshi politician

- ওবায়দুল্লাহ মজুমদার

Minister for Health and Information of East Pakistan
- In office 17 September 1971 – 14 December 1971
- Governor: Abdul Motaleb Malik
- Preceded by: Fazlul Bari; Abdul Monem Khan
- Succeeded by: position dissolved

Personal details
- Born: 1927 (age 98–99) South Satara, Noakhali District, Bengal Presidency, British India
- Party: BKA
- Other political affiliations: AL; AIML
- Education: PhD (political science)
- Alma mater: Ohio State University
- Occupation: Professor

Mohammad Obaidullah Majumdar (Bengali: মোহাম্মদ ওবায়দুল্লাহ মজুমদার; born 1927) is a Bangladeshi professor.

== Early life and education ==
Obaidullah was born in 1927 to a Bengali family of Muslim Majumdars in the village of South Satara, Noakhali District, Bengal Presidency, British India (present-day Chhagalnaiya Upazila, Feni District, Bangladesh). He was a member of the All India Muslim Students Federation and participated in the Pakistan Movement. After studying at Chhagalnaiya High School and Feni College, he completed his postgraduate degree in political science from the University of Dacca in 1951. Later, under the Fulbright Program, he studied at Ohio State University in the United States.

== Career ==
From 1952 to 1964, he served as a professor at Feni College. Upon returning from Ohio, he taught at Momenshahi Cadet College and was appointed principal of Patiya Government College in 1966. In 1970, he was elected as a member of the National Assembly of Pakistan representing East Pakistan.

He crossed over the international border to India on 26 March 1971 with Dr. Amir Hussain and Havildar Nooruddin at the start of the Bangladesh Liberation War and sought help of Border Security Force to establish a Mukti Bahini unit composed of officers of the East Pakistan Rifles. He made contact with Major PK Ghosh of the Border Security Force. However, after staying in Indian refugee camps for two months, he returned to East Pakistan in June. During the war in September, he was appointed as the Minister of Health and Information in the Malik ministry of East Pakistan.

After the appointment as provincial minister, he identified himself as a Pakistani nationalist and claimed that he had been forced to take refuge in India due to the circumstances following Operation Searchlight in March and returned to East Pakistan as soon as the opportunity arose, evading the eyes of the Indian Army and Border Security Force. He alleged that although most refugees wished to return to the province, they were prevented by Indian authorities.

After the independence of Bangladesh, he became a central member of the Bangladesh Khilafat Andolan, an Islamist party established in 1981.
