= 1962 Pakistani general election =

- 28 March 1962

150 of the 156 seats in the National Assembly 76 seats needed for a majority
Head of government before election
Ayub Khan
Martial law
Head of government after election
Ayub Khan
Independent

General elections were held in Pakistan on 28 March 1962. The National Assembly was elected indirectly by the basic democracy electoral college system. Political parties were banned and the elections were held on a non-partisan basis.

== Background ==
The National Assembly had been suspended in 1958 after President Iskandar Ali Mirza introduced martial law. A new constitution was adopted in 1962, which provided for an indirectly elected 156-seat National Assembly, of which 150 seats were elected from single-member constituencies by electoral colleges under the "basic democracy" system, and six seats reserved for women, who were elected by the 150 elected members. The seats were divided equally between East and West Pakistan. There were 80,000 members of the electoral college, also divided equally between the two wings.

== Campaign ==
A total of 610 candidates contested the 156 seats. Campaigning took place in male-dominated teashops and candidates' homes, often involving meals to attract voters.

== Aftermath ==
After the election of the 150 members, the six seats reserved for women were elected on 29 May. The newly elected National Assembly convened for its first meeting on 8 June. Martial law was ended, At the time, the political parties were banned and independent members of the National Assembly formed parliamentary group. The dominating group was Democratic group, led by Mohammad Ali Bogra, which was supported by 41 members. The group was supporter of president Ayub Khan. Another group with 21 members was led by Sardar Bahadur Khan. and political parties were allowed to reform after the passing of the Political Parties Bill on 17 July. After the bill was passed, Several groups including Democratic merged with newly-formed Convention Muslim League and gave the party 105 members. On the other hand, newly-formed Council Muslim League with 10 members gave support to the Pakistan People's group, the opposition group, which had 25 members.
