= A. K. Mosharraf Hossain =

East Pakistan politician

A. K. Mosharraf Hossain was a politician who was elected as a member of the Pakistan Democratic Party from the Mymensingh-13 constituency in the 1970 East Pakistan Provincial Assembly election, and later served as a minister in the Malik ministry in 1971.

== Biography ==
Mosharraf was born in 1929 in the village of Panchrukhi in Nandail Thana, Mymensingh District, in the Bengal Presidency of British India. His father was Imam Hossain, a resident of Gulkibari Road in Mymensingh. In 1950, he earned a bachelor's degree in arts from the University of Dhaka, and the following year completed his master's degree in the same field from the same university. After joining the Krishak Sramik Party in 1954, he obtained LLB from the University of Dhaka in the following year. In the 1965 East Pakistan Provincial Assembly election, he was elected as a member of the provincial assembly from the National Democratic Front. Five years later, in the 1970 East Pakistan Provincial Assembly election, he was again elected from the Mymensingh-13 constituency as a member of the Pakistan Democratic Party. During the Bangladesh Liberation War in 1971, he served as works, power, and irrigation minister in the Malik ministry. Later, he served as the General Secretary of a political party named the Islamic Democratic League.
