= Khan A Sabur =

Bangladeshi Politician

Member of Parliament
- In office 18 February 1979 – 25 January 1982
- Preceded by: M. A. Bari
- Succeeded by: Momen Uddin Ahmed
- Constituency: Khulna-6

Member of National Assembly of Pakistan
- In office 8 June 1962 – 7 June 1965
- Succeeded by: S.M.A. Majeed
- Constituency: NE-26 (Khulna-II)

Member of the Bengal Legislative Assembly
- In office 1946–1947
- Preceded by: Abdul Hakeem
- Constituency: Khulna

Personal details
- Born: 10 October 1908 Bagerhat, Eastern Bengal and Assam, British India
- Died: 25 January 1982 (aged 73) Dhaka, Bangladesh
- Party: Muslim League (Qayyum) (until 1971); Bangladesh Muslim League (1976–1982)
- Occupation: Politician

Abdus Sabur Khan (10 October 1908 – 25 January 1982) was a Bangladeshi politician and lawyer from Khulna. He served as a minister in the government of Ayub Khan. During the Bangladesh Liberation War, Khan stood in favor of Pakistan and later listed as a Razakar from Khulna according to the released list of Bangladesh government.

== Early life ==
Khan was born on 10 October 1908 in Khulna, in the then East Bengal and Assam, British India. His father was Nazmul Hossain Khan, who was a lawyer. Khan passed his matriculation from Khulna Zilla School in 1929. In 1931, he completed his intermediate from Calcutta Presidency College. He obtained a bachelor's degree from City College, Kolkata in 1933.

He also played football for the "Khulna Mohammedan Sporting" alongside teammates Syed Ali Ahmed and A. Hamid.

== Career ==
Khan joined the Krishak Sramik Party in 1937. He later joined the Bengal Provincial Muslim League and went on to become its joint secretary in 1938. As a candidate from the Muslim League he was elected to Bengal Legislative Assembly. He was elected to Pakistan National Assembly in the 1962 Pakistani general election. He was the minister of Communication in the Ayub Khan's cabinet. He was later a member of the Muslim League (Qayyum) and contested in the 1970 Pakistani general election. During the Bangladesh Liberation War he sided with the Pakistan Army against Bangladeshi independence. He was arrested in 1972 after Bangladesh was liberated and was later released under the general amnesty of the Collaborators Act 1972. In 1976, he established the Bangladesh Muslim League and was elected to parliament in 1979 from three constituencies in Khulna.

=== Pakistan Football Federation ===
Khan served as president of the Pakistan Football Federation between 1965 and 1972.

== Death ==
Khan died on 25 January 1982. He remained a bachelor his whole life and donated all his property to a public welfare trust.
