= National Democratic Alliance (Bangladesh) =

The National Democratic Alliance was an alliance of right-wing political parties of Bangladesh.

== History ==
The National Democratic Alliance was formed in 1992 by 10 nationalist political parities and was led by Khandaker Moshtaque Ahmed.

Khandaker Abdur Rashid, a convicted assassin of Bangladesh's first president, Sheikh Mujibur Rahman, was elected to parliament from Comilla-6 as a nominee of the National Democratic Alliance.
