= Raisuddin Ahmed =

Bangladeshi cricketer and cricket administrator (1939–2021)

Raisuddin Ahmed (1939 – 20 January 2021) was a Bangladeshi cricketer and cricket administrator.

== Biography ==
Ahmed attended St Gregory High School, Notre Dame College, Dhaka, and Dhaka University. A batsman and leg-spin bowler, he played one first-class match for Dhaka University in the 1957-58 Quaid-e-Azam Trophy.

He was the general secretary of the Bangladesh Cricket Control Board from 1975 to 1981, when cricket in the newly independent Bangladesh was beginning to take shape. He was one of the instigators of the Dhaka Premier League in 1975, and during his term the first touring teams visited – the MCC in 1976-77 and 1978-79 – and Bangladesh became an Associate member of the International Cricket Conference. He later served as the Bangladesh Cricket Board's vice-president from 1991 to 2001, when Bangladesh won the 1997 ICC Trophy and gained Test status in 2000.

He was a director of Biman Bangladesh Airlines, the national carrier, and was influential in getting the airline to become Bangladesh cricket's first major sponsor.

Ahmed died at a hospital in Dhaka after being admitted for COVID-19 during the COVID-19 pandemic in Bangladesh.
