= Fazlul Bari (Pakistani politician) =

East Pakistani politician (1922–1971)

Provincial Minister of East Pakistan
- In office 1965–1969
- Governor: Abdul Monem Khan
- Portfolio: Health, Labour and Social Welfare
- Preceded by: Maung Shwe Prue Chowdhury
- Succeeded by: Obaidullah Majumdar; ASM Solomon
- In office 1964–1965
- Governor: Abdul Monem Khan
- Portfolio: Revenue, Civil Assistance and Rehabilitation
- Preceded by: Abdus Salam
- Succeeded by: Fakir Abdul Mannan

Personal details
- Born: Muhammad Fazlul Bari; 1 January 1922 Chandania village, Bogra District, Bengal Presidency, British India
- Died: 27 March 1971 (aged 49) Bogra, East Pakistan, Pakistan
- Party: PMLC
- Other political affiliations: PML (1947–1962); AIML (1942–1947)
- Education: Bachelor's degree
- Alma mater: Bogra Zilla School
- Occupation: Government official, newspaper editor, politician

Muhammad Fazlul Bari (1 January 1922 – 27 March 1971) was a Pakistani politician, newspaper editor, and government official. He served as a provincial minister of East Pakistan during the 1960s, holding the portfolios of Revenue, Civil Assistance and Rehabilitation (1964–1965) and Health, Labour and Social Welfare (1965–1969). He was killed in Bogra on 27 March 1971 during Operation Searchlight, the military crackdown launched by the Pakistan Army at the outset of the Bangladesh Liberation War.

== Early life ==
Bari was born on 1 January 1922 in Chandania village of Bogra District, Bengal Presidency, British India, in the area now comprising Shibganj Upazila of Bogra District, Bangladesh, into the family of Maulvi Moyez Uddin. He began involvement in student politics in 1937 and completed his secondary education at Bogra Zilla School in 1939. During his student years, he joined the All-India Muslim Students League and was appointed joint secretary of the Bengal Provincial Muslim Students League.

After completing secondary education, Bari joined the Bengal Provincial Muslim League in 1942. From the following year, he served as a member of the provincial council of Bengal and of the central council of the All-India Muslim League. In 1943, he became editor of the Bengali-language fortnightly newspaper Pakistan. In 1944, he became vice-president of the Bengal Muslim Students' League. He obtained a bachelor's degree with honours in 1945. The following year, he retired from the central council and served as secretary of the Muslim National Guard for two years. In 1947, he became council member of the Pakistan Muslim League.

== Career ==
In 1953, Bari was appointed vice chairman of the Bogra District Board, a position he held for five years, subsequently serving as vice chairman of the Bogra District Council for a further five years. Following his election at the 1962 East Pakistan Provincial Assembly election, he became a member of the East Pakistan Provincial Assembly and was appointed secretary of the assembly.

In 1964, he was appointed East Pakistan's Provincial Minister of Revenue, Civil Assistance and Rehabilitation, succeeding Abdus Salam in that portfolio. In 1965, he was appointed Provincial Minister of Health, Labour and Social Welfare, succeeding Maung Shwe Prue Chowdhury, and held this post until 1969.

== Death ==
On 27 March 1971, the second day of Operation Searchlight, the Pakistan Army's military offensive against the Bengali population of East Pakistan, Fazlul Bari was shot and killed by Pakistani forces at his residence in Bogra. He was 49 years old. His death occurred in the opening days of the Bangladesh Liberation War, which concluded with the independence of Bangladesh in December 1971.
