= Sindh Mohajir Punjabi Pathan Muttahida Mahaz =

Sindh Mohajir Punjabi Pathan Muttahida Mahaz سندھ مہاجر پنجابی پٹھان متحدہ محاذ
- English name: Sindh Mohajir-Pashtun-Punjabi United Front
- Abbreviation: MPPM
- Convenor: Nawab Muzaffar Khan
- Founded: 1969
- Headquarters: Hyderabad, Sindh, Pakistan
- Ideology: Mohajir Punjabi Pashtuns Unity; Mohajir nationalism Pashtun nationalism Punjabi nationalism

The Sindh Mohajir Punjabi Pathan Muttahida Mahaz ('Sindh Mohajir-Pashtun-Punjabi United Front', abbreviated MPPM) was a political party in the Pakistani province Sindh. The party was founded in 1969. Nawab Muzaffar Khan was the convenor of MPPM. In theory the party sought to serve as a political platform for Muhajirs, Pashtuns and Punjabis in Sindh (i.e. populations that had migrated to Sindh after the birth of Pakistan), but in reality it functioned as a Muhajir political party as the Pashtun and Punjabi presence in the MPPM ranks was very limited. The party mobilized Urdu-speaking Muhajirs against the emerging Sindhi nationalist movement. It was led by Muhajir bureaucrats and businessmen. The main base of the MPPM was the city of Hyderabad.

The MPPM was the first political party to use the word 'Muhajir' in a political context.

The MPPM contested the 1970 general election from Hyderabad. Nawab Muzaffar Khan was elected to the Sindh Provincial Assembly. A key demand of the MPPM in the election campaign was scrapping the quota system for recruitments to the Central Civil Service, a system that affected Mohajirs negatively.

The MPPM campaigned against moves to increase the official use of Sindhi language in education, in particular the August 1970 decision of the University of Sindh which made Sindhi the official language and the language for internal communication in the University, in effect marginalizing non Sindhis especially Mohajirs who made up the majority of the city at the time. On December 1970 the Board of Intermediate and Secondary Education in Hyderabad introduced basic Sindhi as a mandatory school subject for Urdu speakers and made Sindhi the sole official language of the Board. Mohajir protest and Sindhi counter-protests led to riots and violence in January 1971. During the 1972 Language violence in Sindh, the MPPM functioned as a de facto representative of the Mohaijr side.
