= Mokhlesur Rahman Mia =

Bangladeshi politician

- মোখলেছুর রহমান মিয়া

Member of the Bangladesh Parliament for Rangpur-23
- In office 18 February 1979 – 12 February 1982
- Preceded by: Seat did not exist
- Succeeded by: Seat abolished

Personal details
- Born: 13 November 1940 Palashbari, Bengal Presidency, British India
- Party: Bangladesh Nationalist Party

Mokhlesur Rahman Mia is a Bangladesh Nationalist Party politician. He was elected a member of parliament from Rangpur-23 in the 1979 Bangladeshi general election.

== Biography ==
Mokhlesur Rahman Mia was born on 13 November 1940 in Palashbari, Bengal Presidency, British India.

Mokhlesur Rahman Mia was elected a member of parliament from Rangpur-23 constituency as a Bangladesh Nationalist Party candidate in the 1979 Bangladeshi general election.
