= 1970 Azad Kashmiri general election =

1970 Azad Kashmir general election
	First party	Second party	Third party
Party	PPP	PML(N)	MC
Seats won	24	10	4
	Fourth party	Fifth party
Party	Jamaat-i-Islami	Independents
Seats won	1	2

General elections were held in Azad Kashmir in 1970 to elect the members of first assembly of Azad Kashmir.
