= Nizam-e-Islam Party =

Far-right political party in Bangladesh

Bangladesh Nizam-e-Islam Party বাংলাদেশ নেজামে ইসলাম পার্টি
- Ameer: Sorowar Kamal Azizi
- General Secretary: Abu Taher Khan
- Founder: Athar Ali Bengali
- Founded: March 20, 1952; 74 years ago
- Split from: Jamiat Ulema-e-Islam Pakistan
- Headquarters: 60/A Purana Paltan, Dhaka
- Student wing: Bangladesh Islami Chatra Samaj
- Youth wing: Bangladesh Islami Juba Samaj
- Ideology: Islamism; Islamic fundamentalism Social conservatism Deobandism
- Political position: Far-right
- Religion: Islam
- National affiliation: 11 Party Alliance
- Colors: Light green
- Bangladesh Parliament: 0 / 350

Election symbol
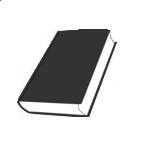
- Book

Party flag
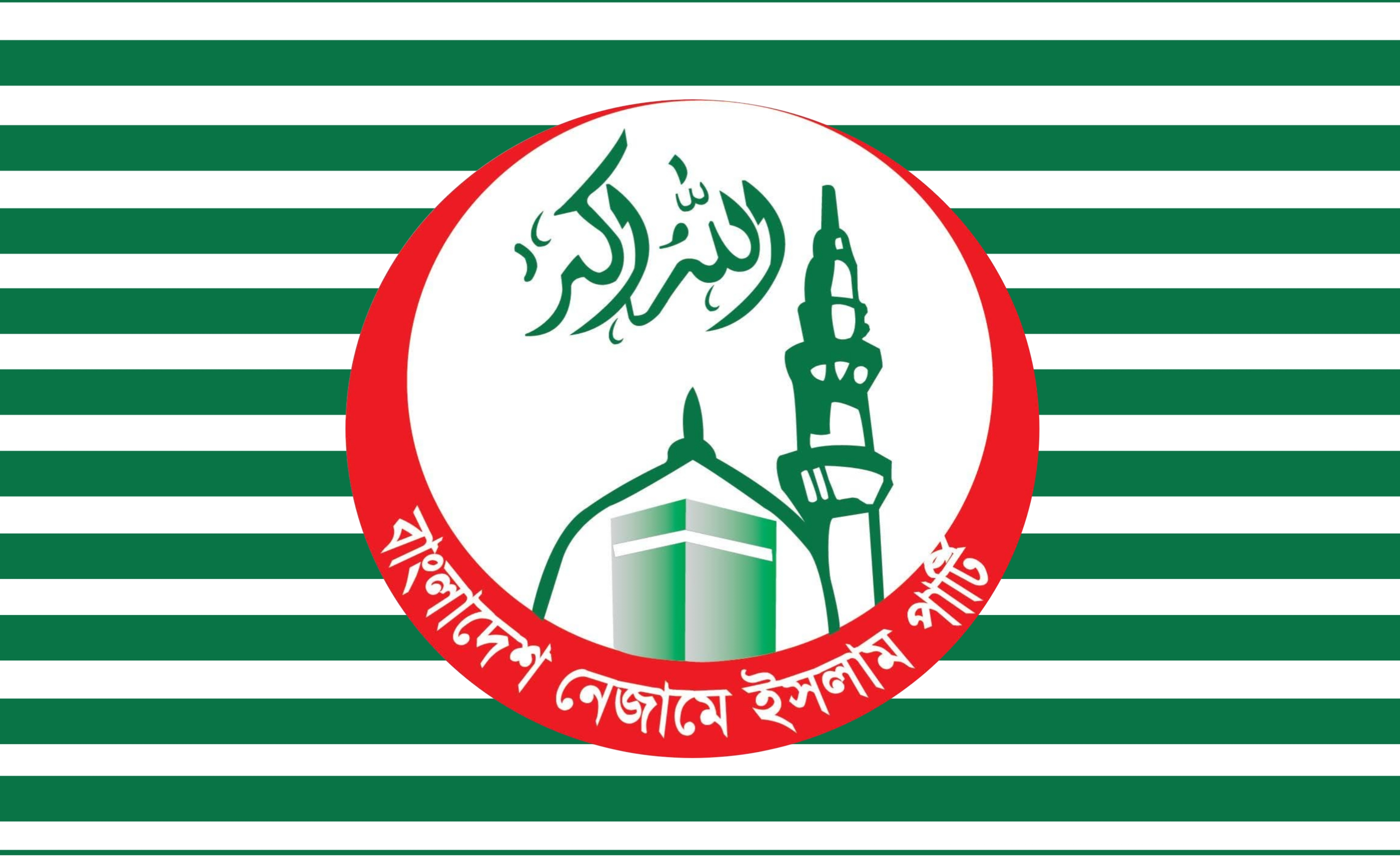

The Nizam-e-Islam Party (Bengali: নেজামে ইসলাম পার্টি, lit. 'Order of Islam Party'), officially the Bangladesh Nizam-e-Islam Party, is an Islamist political party in Bangladesh. The party was founded in the city of Kishoreganj in 1952, by the Islamic scholars of erstwhile East Bengal, Pakistan as an offshoot of the Jamiat Ulema-e-Islam Pakistan. It was one of the four political parties belonging to the United Front alliance which defeated the Muslim League in the 1954 legislative assembly election.

== History ==
=== Establishment ===
The Jamiat Ulema-e-Hind, founded in 1919, was a political body of Islamic scholars predominantly belonging to the Deobandi movement that opposed the partition of India. In 1945, a breakaway faction was formed under the leadership of Shabbir Ahmad Usmani, who was one of the founders of the original party. The new faction, known as the All-India Jamiat Ulema-e-Islam, supported the creation of Pakistan and sided with the pro-partition All-India Muslim League party. The organisation took the name Jamiat Ulema-e-Islam after the partition in 1947, and had representatives in both the western and eastern wings of the new Dominion of Pakistan. As a result of broken promises relating to Islamic governance, the Jamiat broke its ties with the Pakistan Muslim League in 1952. Its political wing, the Nizam-e-Islam Party, was subsequently formed at a three-day conference ending on 20 March in Haybatnagar, Kishoreganj. Athar Ali Bengali was appointed as the party's inaugural president, with Syed Muslehuddin as secretary-general and Ashraf Ali Dharnondoli as assistant secretary.

=== Dominion of Pakistan (1947–1956) ===
The party swiftly gained prominence in Muslim-majority Bengal, in comparison to the modernist-capitalist Muslim League, because its members were composed of popular Islamic scholars. In the lead-up to the 1954 East Bengal Legislative Assembly election, the party eventually joined the United Front coalition which challenged the Muslim League. In the introduction of the United Front's 21 Point Programme manifesto was the statement "No law shall be enacted against the Qur'an and sunnah". The coalition was successful, with the Nizam-e-Islam Party winning 19 of the United Front's 223 seats, in comparison to the Muslim League which won only 9 seats. By virtue of also attaining seats in the ministry, the party gained important roles in policy-making. Farid Ahmad became East Bengal's Minister of Labour, Abdul Wahab Khan became the Speaker of the Assembly, and the ministries of Law, Land and Education were also under the Nizam-e-Islam party. The former Prime Minister of Pakistan Chaudhry Muhammad Ali later joined the party, and was appointed its president.

=== Islamic Republic of Pakistan (1956–1971) ===
The Nizam-e-Islam Party protested against the central government's discriminatory treatment of Bengalis. It played a role in the struggle for East Pakistan's demands. For example, they demanded that Pakistan's capital be changed from Rawalpindi to Dhaka and that the headquarters of the Pakistan Navy to be in Chittagong, rather than Karachi.

In 1966, the Nizam-e-Islam party asked its ministers to resign from the government. The party split from the Jamiat Ulema-e-Islam in the following year. In 1969, a central election was held within the party, with Muhammad Shafi as chief advisor, Zafar Ahmad Usmani as president, Athar Ali as executive president, Abdul Wahab Khan and Mustafa al-Madani as vice-presidents, Ehtisham ul Haq Thanvi as qaid (chief leader) and Siddique Ahmad as secretary-general.

In the lead-up to the 1970 East Pakistan Provincial Assembly election, the Party entered into an agreement with the Jamaat-e-Islami that the Jamaat will not nominate a candidate in a constituency where the Nizam-e-Islam nominates their candidate, and that the Nizam-e-Islam will not nominate a candidate where the Jamaat has nominated a candidate. Regardless, the Awami League under the leadership of Sheikh Mujibur Rahman won all the seats in East Pakistan except twelve (one belonging to Nizam-e-Islam), rightfully making him the next Prime Minister of Pakistan. A lengthy delay in the transfer of power to the Awami League in Bengal by the central government in West Pakistan, eventually led to the outbreak of the Bangladesh Liberation War.

The party was against Bangladesh being an independent country. Its leaders like Farid Ahmad supported the Pakistan army and their paramilitary forces. The party was in the Peace Committees of East Pakistan, and provided intelligence to Pakistan Army. Ahmad was killed after the war by members of the Mujib Bahini.

=== Bangladesh period (1971–present) ===
The government of Bangladesh banned all religion-based parties, including Nizam-e-Islam, after its independence. In 1978, this ban was lifted under president Ziaur Rahman. The Nizam-e-Islam Party was reorganised in 1981, with Siddique Ahmad as its new president, Manzurul Ahsan as secretary, Ashraf Ali Dharnondoli as assistant secretary and Sarwar Kamal Azizi as publicity and public welfare secretary. A central election was held three years later, with Abdul Malek Halim becoming president, Siddique Ahmad as adviser, Ataur Rahman and Sarwar Kamal Azizi as vice presidents, Ashraf Ali Dharnondoli as general secretary and Nurul Haque Arman as organising secretary.

It became part of the Islami Okiya Jote alliance composed of six parties.

== See also ==
- List of Deobandi organisations
