= Abdul Motaleb Malik =

Last Civilian Governor of East Pakistan

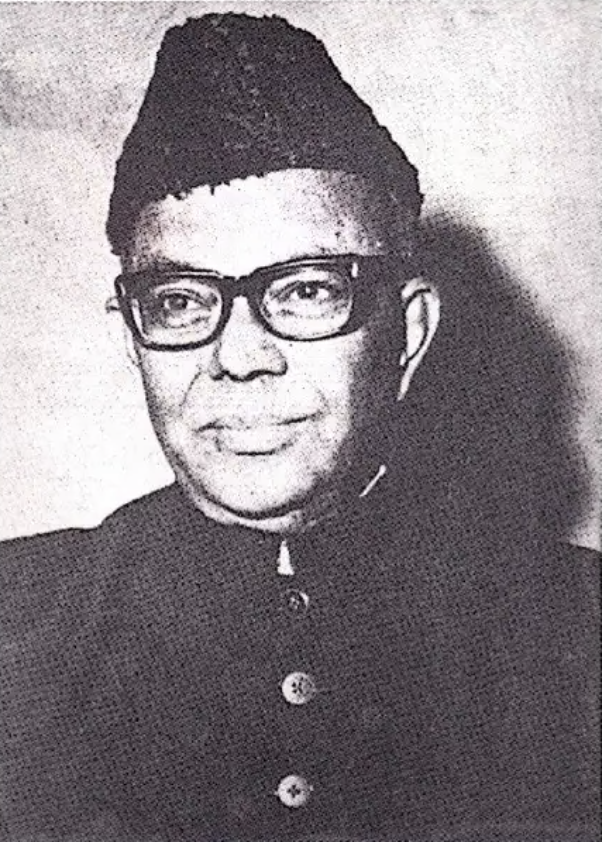
- Official portrait, 1971

14th Governor of East Pakistan
- In office 31 August 1971 – 14 December 1971
- President: Yahya Khan
- Preceded by: Tikka Khan
- Succeeded by: A. A. K. Niazi

Minister of Health
- In office 20 September 1949 – 15 May 1950
- Prime Minister: Liaquat Ali Khan
- Preceded by: Sardar Bahadur Khan
- In office 31 March 1951 – 11 August 1955
- Prime Minister: Khwaja Nazimuddin; Mohammad Ali Bogra
- Succeeded by: Kamini Kumar Datta

Personal details
- Born: 7 September 1905 Chuadanga, Bengal, British India
- Died: 21 June 1977 (aged 71) Dacca Central Jail, Dhaka, Bangladesh
- Party: Pakistan Muslim League

Abdul Motaleb Malik (7 September 1905– 21 June 1977) was a Pakistani ophthalmologist, diplomat and politician who served as the last civilian Governor of East Pakistan.

== Early life ==
He was born on 1905 in Chuadanga, Bengal Presidency, British India. He studied medicine in Vienna. He was a trade unionist in Bengal.

== Career ==
From 1949 to 1955 he was the Minister for Minorities Affairs, and Works, Health and Labour of Liaqat Ali Khan cabinet. Afterwards he served as the Ambassador of Pakistan to Switzerland, Yugoslavia, Austria, People's Republic of China, Philippines, Australia and New Zealand. From August 1969 to February 1971, he was made the Minister for Health, Labour, Works and Social Welfare.

He was made the Governor of East Pakistan on 31 August 1971. His inauguration was attended by Abdul Monem Khan, Syed Azizul Huq, Fazlul Qadir Chaudhry, Khan A Sabur, Yusuf Ali Chowdhury, Sultanuddin Ahmad, Abdul Jabbar Khan, Ghulam Azam, and Pir Mohsinuddin. He resigned on 14 December 1971 with his entire cabinet after Indian MIG-21's had bombed a Dhaka Government House where he was attending a high level-meeting. He then sought refuge in the neutral zone, which had been created by the International Red Cross at the Dhaka Hotel Intercontinental. On 20 November 1972 he was sentenced to life in prison for waging war against Bangladesh.

== Pakistan Football Federation ==
Malik served as president of the Pakistan Football Federation between 1952 and 1958.

== Death ==
Malik died in 1977.

== See also ==
- Malik ministry
