= Pakistan Muslim League – Qayyum =

Pakistan Muslim League – Qayyum پاکستان مسلم ليگ – قيوم
- Leader: Syed M Saqlain Abbas Bukhari
- Founder: Abdul Qayyum Khan
- Founded: 1970
- Dissolved: 1993
- Split from: Council Muslim League
- Ideology: Conservatism

The Pakistan Muslim League – Qayyum (PML–Qayyum), also known as Qayyum Muslim League, was a Pakistani political party. After an attempt to neutralize the Pakistan Peoples Party and the Awami League by uniting the PML-Convention and PML-Council, instead, PML-Council leader Sardar Qayyum quit the party and formed his own faction.

PML-Qayyum fielded 173 candidates for the National Assembly of Pakistan in the 1970 general election and won nine seats, whike the first runner-up won 26 seats. It won one seat at the national level and two in Khyber Pakhtunkhwa in the 1977 elections, which was the last time it won seats. It last ran candidates in the 1993 Pakistani general election.
