= Council Muslim League =

Political party in Pakistan

Council Muslim League کونسل مسلم لیگ
- Other Historical Leaders: Sardar Muhammad Zafarullah; Mumtaz Daultana; Chaudhry Muhammad Husain Chattha; Khawaja Muhammad Safdar; Chaudhry Zahoor Elahi
- Founded: 1962
- Dissolved: 1973
- Split from: PML
- Merged into: PML(F)
- Ideology: Conservatism; Anti-Ayub Khan

The Council Muslim League was a faction of the Pakistan Muslim League that split from the Convention Muslim League that was supportive of the military regime of the President of Pakistan Gen. Ayub Khan.

Khan Abdul Qayyum Khan, Sardar Muhammad Zafarullah, Mian Mumtaz Daultana, Sardar Shaukat Hayat Khan, Chaudhry Muhammad Hussain Chattha, Khawaja Muhammad Safdar and Chaudhry Zahoor Elahi were prominent leaders of the Council Muslim League.

== Presidents ==
1. Khawaja Nazimuddin (1962-1964)
2. Nurul Amin (1964–1969)
3. Mumtaz Daultana (1969–1973)
