= Convention Muslim League =

Political party in Pakistan

Convention Muslim League کنونشن مسلم لیگ
- Abbreviation: CML
- President: Chaudhry Khaliquzzaman (first); Ayub Khan (second); Fazlul Qadir Chaudhry (third)
- Founded: 1962
- Dissolved: 1973
- Merger of: RP
- Split from: PML
- Preceded by: Pakistan Muslim League
- Merged into: PML(F)
- Ideology: Conservatism; Pro-Ayub Khan; Secularism; Industrialism; Islamic modernism Free markets

Election symbol
- Rose

The Convention Muslim League (CML) also called Pakistan Muslim League - Convention was a faction of the Pakistan Muslim League that split-off in 1962, in support of the military regime of the President of Pakistan, General Ayub Khan.

The opposition party was known as the Council Muslim League. Convention Muslim League contested presidential election of Pakistan held in 1965. CML's electoral symbol was a rose. A convention of Muslim League held in Karachi in September 1962 which was presided by Nawab Muhammad Amin, who was supporter of the 1962 constitution. Ch Khaliquzamman was selected as the chief organizer. The purpose of the Party was only to give political platform to CMLA Ayub Khan. This party was in power for 7 years but could not get the public's appreciation. This party was a composition of the Elite class of Pakistan. Some sources say that Ch Khaliquzamman said that there is no place of democracy in Islam. This party's constitution was also referred to as non democratic in which except of the President, all other members were selected instead of being elected. This party went into decline after the end of Ayub Khan's Regime. Ayub Khan resigned as the president from the party on 31 December 1969 and transferred the party's powers to Fazal ul Qadir Chaudhary. Chaudhary tried his best to revive the party but failed.

== Formation ==
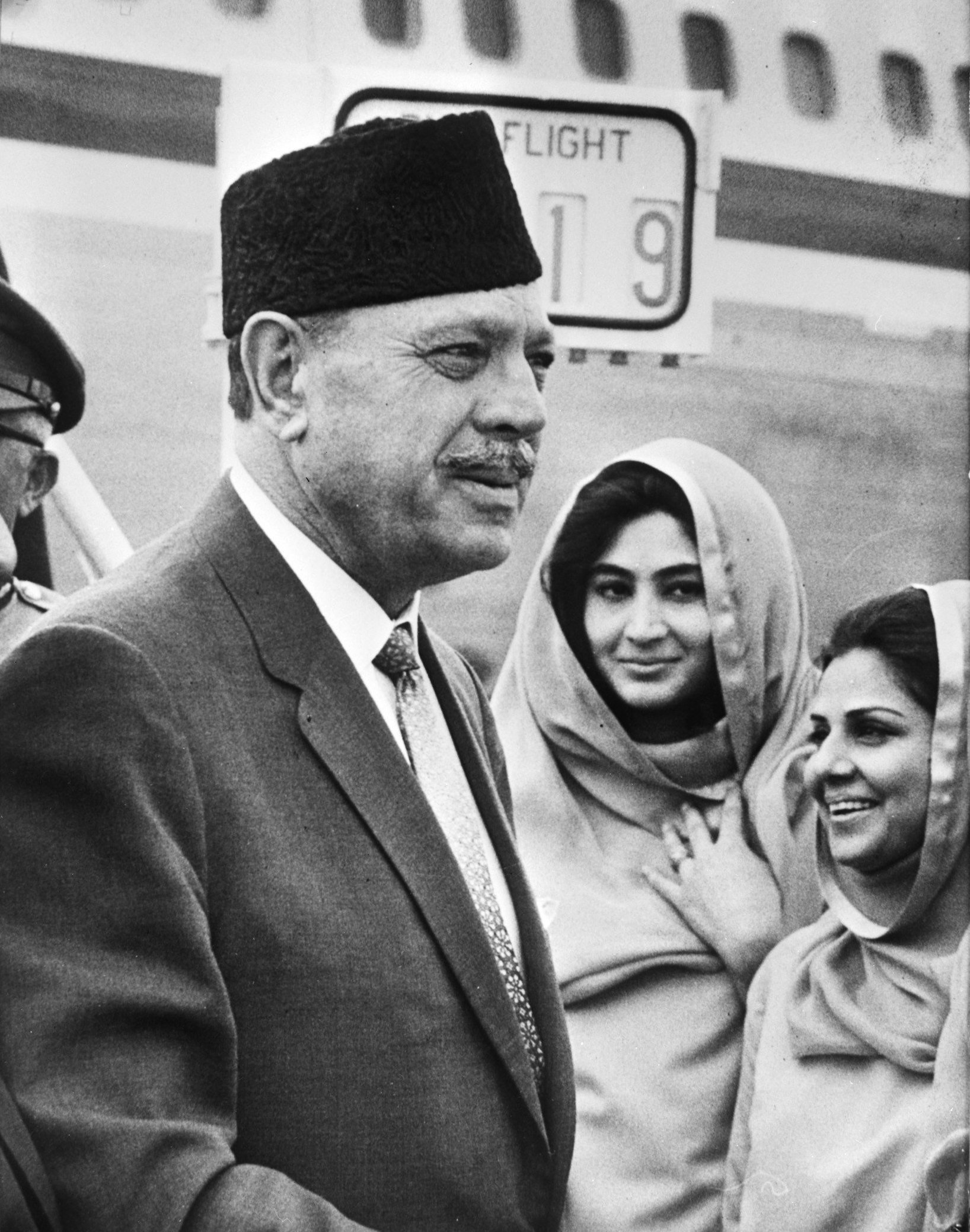
Ayub Khan, in whose favor the CML was formed

The Convention Muslim League was formed on the basis of support for politician and military general Muhammad Ayub Khan in 1962. Ayub Khan's military presidency started in 1959, he wanted authority over the Pakistan Muslim League. He also wanted to form his own political party. Ayub called for a large convention between the Pakistan Muslim League and Republican Party leaders to form his new political party and adhere to his new constitution, Ayub Khan took leadership of the Pakistan Muslim League in 1962. His Industrialist, Western style policy made him Liberal and Secularist in the eyes of many 'Pakistan' Muslim League leaders, therefore he was deeply unpopular and the party splintered, some who favored Ayub Khan and some who did not. Ayub Khan used the Convention Muslim League as his ruling party to gain legitimacy in order to seem as a follower of the democratic process during his martial law.

- The Convention Muslim League - In support of Ayub Khan and his new constitution

== Ideology ==
Ayub Khan was generally considered by many Islamists on the Far-right as a Liberal, due to his Western attire and somewhat Secular policies. At the same time though, the Convention Muslim League was made up of many Muslim Conservatives - having been splintered from the conservative Pakistan Muslim League. The party did not unilaterally reach a consensus on the Conservative-Liberal stance, instead the party mainly focused on Industrialism, supporting the economic and social growth of Ayub Khan's tenure. By supporting Ayub Khan, the party indirectly supported military rule, but their main reason for supporting Ayub Khan was for his positive economic and Industrial policies as well as a modernist outlook.

== Manifesto ==
- Pakistan should be made an ideological state and an Islamic Board should be established to impose the Islamic laws in the country.
- The central government will have only these portfolios, Defence, Foreign Policy, Transportation, Exports and currency.
- A new province will be created in East Pakistan's northern areas.
- Naval headquarter will be in East Pakistan.
- Land ownership will be decreased.
- 51 percent of the shares of all Banks and insurance companies will be handed over to the government.
- Farmers will get 2000 rupee loan scheme.
- Provinces will get the employment in central jobs with respect to their population.
- Education will be free.
- Two new ministries will be created. Islamic affairs and Youth welfare.

== Presidents ==
1. Chaudhry Khaliquzzaman (1962–1963)
2. Ayub Khan (1963–1969)
3. Fazlul Qadir Chaudhry (1969–1971)

== See also ==
- Muslim League Schisms
