= List of members of the 4th Provincial Assembly of East Pakistan =

4th Provincial Assembly
←	3rd East Pakistan Provincial Assembly	Constituent Assembly of Bangladesh	→

Overview
- Legislative body: Provincial Assembly of East Pakistan
- Jurisdiction: Pakistan
- Meeting place: Assembly House
- Term: 9 June 1965 – 23 March 1969
- Election: 1965 East Pakistan Provincial Assembly election
- Government: Second Monem ministry

The Fourth East Pakistan Provincial Assembly was formed on 9 June 1965 following the third provincial election in East Pakistan. It lasted for nearly four years with an incomplete term and was dissolved on 23 March 1969 due to the 1969 mass uprising.

The total number of seats in the Provincial Assembly was 155. The Convention Muslim League (PMLC) won 81 seats. They were followed by independent politicians, who secured a total of 53 seats. The Combined Opposition Parties (COP) won 21 seats, which dissolved later.

== Officers of the Provincial Assembly ==
#	Position	Name	Start	End	Days in office
1	Speaker	Abdul Hamid Chowdhury	10 June 1965	4 September 1968	
1	Speaker	Gamiruddin Pradhan	28 December 1968	23 March 1969	
2	Deputy Speaker	Gamiruddin Pradhan	10 June 1965	28 December 1968	
2	Deputy Speaker	Mashiul Azam Khan	10 June 1965	23 March 1969	
3	Secretary of the House				
4	Leader of the House	Dewan Abdul Basith	10 June 1965	23 March 1969	
5	Leader of the Opposition	Abdul Malek Ukil			
5	Leader of the Opposition	Asaduzzaman Khan			

== Members ==
Region	Constituency Name	Party	Member	Source
Rangpur	PE-1 (Rangpur-I)	Convention Muslim League	Saifur Rahman	
Rangpur	PE-2 (Rangpur-II)	Independent	Abul Makhdun Mia	
Rangpur	PE-3 (Rangpur-III)	Independent	Saidur Rahman	
Rangpur	PE-4 (Rangpur-IV)	Independent	Azizar Rahman Sarker	
Rangpur	PE-5 (Rangpur-V)	Convention Muslim League	Abdur Rahim Mia	
Rangpur	PE-6 (Rangpur-VI)	Independent	Md. Akmal Hossain	
Rangpur	PE-7 (Rangpur-VII)	Convention Muslim League	Anisul Haque Chowdhury	
Rangpur	PE-8 (Rangpur-VIII)	Convention Muslim League	Sheikh Mohammad Asaduzzaman	
Rangpur	PE-9 (Rangpur-IX)	Convention Muslim League	Shamsul Huq	
Rangpur	PE-10 (Rangpur-X)	Convention Muslim League	Monwar Hossain Choudhury	
Rangpur	PE-11 (Rangpur-XI)	Council Muslim League	Abul Bashar	
Dinajpur	PE-12 (Dinajpur-I)	Convention Muslim League	Gamiruddin Pradhan	
Dinajpur	PE-13 (Dinajpur-II)	Convention Muslim League	Mirza Ruhul Amin	
Dinajpur	PE-14 (Dinajpur-III)	Convention Muslim League	A. F. M. Mohsin Choudhury	
Dinajpur	PE-15 (Dinajpur-IV)	Convention Muslim League	Mainuddin Ahmed Choudhury	
Dinajpur	PE-16 (Dinajpur-V)	Independent	Qamruzzaman	
Bogra	PE-17 (Bogra-I)	Convention Muslim League	Abdul Alim	
Bogra	PE-18 (Bogra-II)	Independent	Syed Hammad Ali	
Bogra	PE-19 (Bogra-III)	Independent	Abdul Hamid Khan	
Bogra	PE-20 (Bogra-IV)	Independent	Golam Rabbani Sarker	
Bogra	PE-21 (Bogra-V)	Convention Muslim League	Khorshed Alam Talukder	
Rajshahi	PE-22 (Rajshahi-I)	Independent	Syed Nabibur Rahman	
Rajshahi	PE-23 (Rajshahi-II)	Convention Muslim League	Kazi Shah Mahmood	
Rajshahi	PE-24 (Rajshahi-III)	Independent	Tajammal Husain	
Rajshahi	PE-25 (Rajshahi-IV)	Independent	Manjur Ahmed Mia	
Rajshahi	PE-26 (Rajshahi-V)	Convention Muslim League	Ayenuddin	
Rajshahi	PE-27 (Rajshahi-VI)	Independent	Mollah Abul Kalam Azad	
Rajshahi	PE-28 (Rajshahi-VII)	Independent	Mollah Abdul Majid	
Rajshahi	PE-29 (Rajshahi-VIII)	Council Muslim League	Abdus Sattar Khan Chowdhury	
Pabna	PE-30 (Pabna-I)	Jamaat-e-Islami Pakistan	Abdus Sobhan	
Pabna	PE-31 (Pabna-II)	Independent	Reazuddin Mian	
Pabna	PE-32 (Pabna-III)	Independent	Afzalul Haque	
Pabna	PE-33 (Pabna-IV)	Independent	A. K. Shamsul Alamin	
Pabna	PE-34 (Pabna-V)	Independent	Nurul Huda Shahidullah Khan	
Pabna	PE-35 (Pabna-VI)	Independent	Abdur Rashid Mahmood	
Bakerganj	PE-36 (Bakerganj-I)	All-Pakistan Awami League	Mosharef Hossain	
Bakerganj	PE-37 (Bakerganj-II)	All-Pakistan Awami League	Azharuddin Ahmed	
Bakerganj	PE-38 (Bakerganj-III)	Convention Muslim League	Abdul Jalil Khan	
Bakerganj	PE-40 (Bakerganj-V)	Unknown		
Bakerganj	PE-39 (Bakerganj-IV)	Convention Muslim League	Abdur Rahman Biswas	
Bakerganj	PE-41 (Bakerganj-VI)	Independent	Matin Laskar	
Bakerganj	PE-42 (Bakerganj-VII)	Convention Muslim League	Mir Golam Sarwar	
Bakerganj	PE-43 (Bakerganj-VIII)	Independent	Mofizuddin Talukder	
Bakerganj	PE-44 (Bakerganj-IX)	National Awami Party	Syed Ashraf Hossain	
Bakerganj	PE-45 (Bakerganj-X)	Convention Muslim League	Abul Hussain Talukder	
Bakerganj	PE-46 (Bakerganj-XI)	National Awami Party	Nerode Behari Nag	
Bakerganj	PE-47 (Bakerganj-XII)	Convention Muslim League	Sarder Sultan Mahmood	
Bakerganj	PE-48 (Bakerganj-XIII)	Unknown		
Khulna	PE-49 (Khulna-I)	Convention Muslim League	Altaf Hossain	
Khulna	PE-50 (Khulna-II)	Convention Muslim League	Moslemuddin Ahmed	
Khulna	PE-51 (Khulna-III)	Convention Muslim League	Abul Hossain	
Khulna	PE-52 (Khulna-IV)	Independent	S. M. Amzad Hossain	
Khulna	PE-53 (Khulna-V)	Independent	M Atiar Rahman	
Khulna	PE-54 (Khulna-VI)	Independent	Badruddoza Chowdhury	
Khulna	PE-55 (Khulna-VII)	Convention Muslim League	Sultan Ahmed	
Jessore	PE-56 (Jessore-I)	Convention Muslim League	Sarwar Jan Khan	
Jessore	PE-57 (Jessore-II)	Convention Muslim League	Mosihul Azam Khan	
Jessore	PE-58 (Jessore-III)	Independent	Khondkar Zahurul Haque	
Jessore	PE-59 (Jessore-IV)	National Awami Party	Ahad Ali Khan	
Jessore	PE-60 (Jessore-V)	Convention Muslim League	Abdul Wahab	
Jessore	PE-61 (Jessore-VI)	Independent	Bashiruddin Ahmad Majmadar	
Jessore	PE-62 (Jessore-VII)	Convention Muslim League	M. A. Wadud	
Kushtia	PE-63 (Kushtia-I)	Independent	Abdur Razzaque	
Kushtia	PE-64 (Kushtia-II)	Independent	Mahabubul Haque Khan Chowdhury	
Kushtia	PE-65 (Kushtia-III)	Convention Muslim League	Afiluddin Ahmed	
Faridpur	PE-66 (Faridpur-I)	Convention Muslim League	A. M. Fazlul Karim	
Faridpur	PE-67 (Faridpur-II)	Convention Muslim League	Sarwar Jan Miah	
Faridpur	PE-68 (Faridpur-III)	Independent	M. Atiqur Rahman	
Faridpur	PE-69 (Faridpur-IV)	Convention Muslim League	Lutfar Rahman Howlader	
Faridpur	PE-70 (Faridpur-V)	Convention Muslim League	Serajuddin Ahmed	
Faridpur	PE-71 (Faridpur-VI)	National Democratic Front	Shamsur Rahman	
Faridpur	PE-72 (Faridpur-VII)	Independent	Abdul Khaleque Mia	
Faridpur	PE-73 (Faridpur-VIII)	All-Pakistan Awami League	Sheikh Mosharraf Hossain	
Faridpur	PE-74 (Faridpur-IX)	Independent	Nizamuddin Ahmed	
Dacca	PE-75 (Dacca-I)	All-Pakistan Awami League	M. A. Karim	
Dacca	PE-76 (Dacca-II)	Convention Muslim League	Nizamuddin Ahmed	
Dacca	PE-77 (Dacca-III)	Convention Muslim League	Atauddin Khan	
Dacca	PE-78 (Dacca-IV)	All-Pakistan Awami League	Moslemuddin Khan	
Dacca	PE-79 (Dacca-V)	Convention Muslim League	Abdur Rahman	
Dacca	PE-80 (Dacca-VI)	Convention Muslim League	Asghar Hossain	
Dacca	PE-81 (Dacca-VII)	All-Pakistan Awami League	Abdul Mannan	
Dacca	PE-82 (Dacca-VIII)	Convention Muslim League	Azizur Rahman Choudhury	
Dacca	PE-83 (Dacca-IX)	Council Muslim League	Mohammad Sirajuddin	
Dacca	PE-84 (Dacca-X)	Independent	Md. Mostan Khan	
Dacca	PE-85 (Dacca-XI)	National Awami Party	Ahmadul Kabir	
Dacca	PE-86 (Dacca-XII)	Convention Muslim League	M. A. Zaher	
Dacca	PE-87 (Dacca-XIII)	Convention Muslim League	A. Rahman Bhuiyan	
Dacca	PE-88 (Dacca-XIV)	All-Pakistan Awami League	Alauddin Ahmad	
Dacca	PE-89 (Dacca-XV)	Independent	Abdul Motleb Bhuiya	
Mymensingh	PE-90 (Mymensingh-I)	Independent	Aminur Rahman	
Mymensingh	PE-91 (Mymensingh-II)	Independent	Abdus Sabur	
Mymensingh	PE-92 (Mymensingh-III)	Convention Muslim League	Abdul Hamid Chowdhury	
Mymensingh	PE-93 (Mymensingh-IV)	Independent	Mirza Amjad Hossain	
Mymensingh	PE-94 (Mymensingh-V)	Convention Muslim League	Md. Habibur Rahman	
Mymensingh	PE-95 (Mymensingh-VI)	Convention Muslim League	A. F. M. Altafur Rahman Talukder	
Mymensingh	PE-96 (Mymensingh-VII)	Independent	Kazim Uddin Ahmed	
Mymensingh	PE-97 (Mymensingh-VIII)	Independent	Ayub Ali Khandaker Abdul Hamid	
Mymensingh	PE-98 (Mymensingh-IX)	Independent	Abdul Jalil Miah	
Mymensingh	PE-99 (Mymensingh-X)	Convention Muslim League	Md. Abdul Hannan	
Mymensingh	PE-100 (Mymensingh-XI)	Convention Muslim League	Keramat Ali Talukdar	
Mymensingh	PE-101 (Mymensingh-XII)	Independent	Abdul Halim	
Mymensingh	PE-102 (Mymensingh-XIII)	Independent	Abdul Hamid	
Mymensingh	PE-103 (Mymensingh-XIV)	Tie	-	
Mymensingh	PE-104 (Mymensingh-XV)	Independent	Abdul Hakim Talukder	
Mymensingh	PE-105 (Mymensingh-XVI)	National Democratic Front	A. K. Mosharraf Hossain	
Mymensingh	PE-106 (Mymensingh-XVII)	Nizam-e-Islam Party	Abu Sayeed Wahid Khan	
Mymensingh	PE-107 (Mymensingh-XVIII)	All-Pakistan Awami League	Asaduzzaman Khan	
Mymensingh	PE-108 (Mymensingh-XIX)	Convention Muslim League	Mojibur Rahman	
Mymensingh	PE-109 (Mymensingh-XX)	Independent	Nityananda Das Chowdhury	
Mymensingh	PE-110 (Mymensingh-XXI)	Independent	Abdus Sattar	
Sylhet	PE-111 (Sylhet-I)	All-Pakistan Awami League	Abdul Hakeem Chowdhury	
Sylhet	PE-112 (Sylhet-II)	Convention Muslim League	Abu Hanifa Ahmed	
Sylhet	PE-113 (Sylhet-III)	Independent	Abdul Jalil Khandaker	
Sylhet	PE-114 (Sylhet-IV)	Convention Muslim League	Abdur Rahman	
Sylhet	PE-115 (Sylhet-V)	Convention Muslim League	Ali Yeawar Khan	
Sylhet	PE-116 (Sylhet-VI)	Convention Muslim League	Abdul Majid Khan	
Sylhet	PE-117 (Sylhet-VII)	Independent	Syed Sayeed-ud-Din Ahmad	
Sylhet	PE-118 (Sylhet-VIII)	Independent	Md. Rafique Ahmed	
Sylhet	PE-119 (Sylhet-IX)	Independent	Dewan Taimur Raja Chowdhury	
Sylhet	PE-120 (Sylhet-X)	Convention Muslim League	Dewan Abdur Rab Choudhury	
Comilla	PE-121 (Comilla-I)	Convention Muslim League	Shahidul Islam	
Comilla	PE-122 (Comilla-II)	Independent	Abul Hye	
Comilla	PE-123 (Comilla-III)	Convention Muslim League	Abdus Shakoor Khan	
Comilla	PE-124 (Comilla-IV)	Convention Muslim League	Nurul Islam Bhuyan	
Comilla	PE-125 (Comilla-V)	Independent	Nurul Islam Khan	
Comilla	PE-126 (Comilla-VI)	Convention Muslim League	Harunur Rashid Choudhury	
Comilla	PE-127 (Comilla-VII)	Independent	Abdus Samad Sarker	
Comilla	PE-128 (Comilla-VIII)	Independent	Bazlul Ghani	
Comilla	PE-129 (Comilla-IX)	Independent	Choudhury Mohammad Sarwar	
Comilla	PE-130 (Comilla-X)	Independent	Ahmed Hameed Mahmood	
Comilla	PE-131 (Comilla-XI)	Independent	Abdul Wadud	
Comilla	PE-132 (Comilla-XII)	Convention Muslim League	Abdul Hakim	
Comilla	PE-133 (Comilla-XIII)	Tie	-	
Noakhali	PE-134 (Noakhali-I)	Independent	Nurul Ghani Chowdhury	
Noakhali	PE-135 (Noakhali-II)	Independent	Khaiz Ahmed	
Noakhali	PE-136 (Noakhali-III)	All-Pakistan Awami League	Abdul Malek Ukil	
Noakhali	PE-137 (Noakhali-IV)	All-Pakistan Awami League	Nurul Haque	
Noakhali	PE-138 (Noakhali-V)	Convention Muslim League	Mirza Majibul Haque	
Noakhali	PE-139 (Noakhali-VI)	Independent	Shahbuddin Choudhury	
Noakhali	PE-140 (Noakhali-VII)	Independent	Amirul Islam Kalam	
Chittagong	PE-141 (Chittagong-I)	Independent	Mirza Aboo Ahmed	
Chittagong	PE-142 (Chittagong-II)	Independent	Abu Darda Mohammad Mowahadul Mawla	
Chittagong	PE-143 (Chittagong-III)	Convention Muslim League	Mohammed Khair Siddique	
Chittagong	PE-144 (Chittagong-IV)	Convention Muslim League	Sultan Ahmed	
Chittagong	PE-145 (Chittagong-V)	Convention Muslim League	Alimullah Chowdhury	
Chittagong	PE-146 (Chittagong-VI)	Independent	Sana Meah Chowdhury	
Chittagong	PE-147 (Chittagong-VII)	Independent	Azizar Rahman	
Chittagong	PE-148 (Chittagong-VIII)	All-Pakistan Awami League	Zakerul Haque Chowdhury	
Chittagong	PE-149 (Chittagong-IX)	Independent	Zafar Alam Choudhury	
Chittagong Hill Tracts	PE-150 (Chittagong Hill Tracts)	Convention Muslim League	Maung Shwe Prue Chowdhury	

== Women members ==
Constituency Name	Party	Member	Source
PE-151 (Zone I)	Convention Muslim League	Hamida Chowdhury	
PE-152 (Zone II)	Convention Muslim League	Ayesha Sardar	
PE-153 (Zone III)	Convention Muslim League	Akhtar Jahan Khan	
PE-154 (Zone IV)	Convention Muslim League	Khaleda Habib	
PE-155 (Zone V)	Convention Muslim League	Noorjahan Begum	

== Membership changes ==
- PE-90 Mymensingh-1
- Abdul Hamid Sheikh (PE-52 Khulna-4)
- Sharafatullah, Convention Muslim League (PE-144 Chittagong-4)
- Tridev Roy, independent (PE-150 Chittagong Hill Tracts)
- PE-42 Bakerganj-7
- PE-124 Comilla-4
- Habibur Rahman, Convention Muslim League (PE-27 Rajshahi-6)
- PE-139 Noakhali-6
