= List of members of the 3rd Provincial Assembly of East Pakistan =

3rd Provincial Assembly
←	2nd East Pakistan Provincial Assembly	4th East Pakistan Provincial Assembly	→

Overview
- Legislative body: East Pakistan Provincial Assembly
- Jurisdiction: Pakistan
- Meeting place: Assembly Building
- Term: 9 June 1962 – 1965
- Election: 1962 East Pakistan Provincial Assembly election
- Government: Faruque ministry; First Monem ministry

The Third East Pakistan Provincial Assembly was formed on 9 June 1962 after the second provincial election of East Pakistan. The 4th Provincial Assembly lasted for about two and a half years with an incomplete term and was dissolved in 1965. The total number of seats in the Provincial Assembly was 155.

== Provincial Assembly Officers ==
#	Position	Name	Start	End	Tenure (days)
1	Speaker	Abdul Hamid Chowdhury	9 June 1962		
2	Deputy Speaker	Gamiruddin Pradhan	9 June 1962		
2	Deputy Speaker	Mashiul Azam Khan	9 June 1962		
3	Secretary				
4	Leader of the House	A. T. M. Mustafa	9 June 1962		
4	Leader of the House	Md. Hafizur Rahman			
5	Leader of the Opposition	Afsaruddin Ahmad	9 June 1962		

== Members ==
Region	Constituency	Party	Member	Source
Rangpur	PE-1 (Rangpur-1)	Unknown	Saifur Rahman	
Rangpur	PE-2 (Rangpur-2)	Unknown	Mansur Ahmed	
Rangpur	PE-3 (Rangpur-3)	Unknown	Mohammad Abdur Rahman	
Rangpur	PE-4 (Rangpur-4)	Unknown	Ataur Rahman	
Rangpur	PE-5 (Rangpur-5)	Unknown	Azizur Rahman Sarkar	
Rangpur	PE-6 (Rangpur-6)	Unknown	Aminul Haque Chowdhury	
Rangpur	PE-7 (Rangpur-7)	Unknown	Muhammad Raisuddin Ahmed	
Rangpur	PE-8 (Rangpur-8)	Unknown	Jashiruddin Ahmed	
Rangpur	PE-9 (Rangpur-9)	Unknown	Abdul Gani Kazi	
Rangpur	PE-10 (Rangpur-10)	Unknown	Mashiur Rahman Chowdhury	
Dinajpur	PE-11 (Dinajpur-1)	Unknown	Gamiruddin Pradhan	
Dinajpur	PE-12 (Dinajpur-2)	Unknown	Mirza Ruhul Amin	
Dinajpur	PE-13 (Dinajpur-3)	Unknown	Muhammad Yusuf Ali	
Dinajpur	PE-14 (Dinajpur-4)	Unknown	Moinuddin Ahmed Chowdhury	
Dinajpur	PE-15 (Dinajpur-5)	Unknown	Kazi Shamsul Huda Chowdhury	
Bogra	PE-16 (Bogra-1)	Unknown	Abdul Alim	
Bogra	PE-17 (Bogra-2)	Unknown	Muhammad Fazlul Bari	
Bogra	PE-18 (Bogra-3)	Unknown	Md. Sirajul Huq Talukder	
Bogra	PE-19 (Bogra-4)	Unknown	Golam Rabbani Sarkar	
Bogra	PE-20 (Bogra-5)	Unknown	Khurshed Alam Talukdar	
Rajshahi	PE-21 (Rajshahi-1)	Unknown	Zillur Rahman Shah	
Rajshahi	PE-22 (Rajshahi-2)	Unknown	Kazi Sahed Mahmud	
Rajshahi	PE-23 (Rajshahi-3)	Unknown	Momtazuddin Mia	
Rajshahi	PE-24 (Rajshahi-4)	Unknown	Sirajul Islam	
Rajshahi	PE-25 (Rajshahi-5)	Unknown	Mohammad Amin Uddin	
Rajshahi	PE-26 (Rajshahi-6)	Unknown	Jasimmuddin Munshi	
Rajshahi	PE-27 (Rajshahi-7)	Unknown	Molla Abul Kalam Azad	
Rajshahi	PE-28 (Rajshahi-8)	Unknown	Abdus Sattar Mondal	
Pabna	PE-29 (Pabna-1)	Unknown	Abdus Sobhan	
Pabna	PE-30 (Pabna-2)	Unknown	A. Razzak	
Pabna	PE-31 (Pabna-3)	Unknown	Shahjahan Ali Khan	
Pabna	PE-32 (Pabna-4)	Unknown	Saifuddin Ahmed	
Pabna	PE-33 (Pabna-5)	Unknown	Nurul Huda Shahidullah Khan	
Pabna	PE-34 (Pabna-6)	Unknown	Yunus Uddin Talukdar	
Bakerganj	PE-35 (Bakerganj-1)	Unknown	Mohammad Elias Mia Master	
Bakerganj	PE-36 (Bakerganj-2)	Unknown	Azahar Uddin Ahmed	
Bakerganj	PE-37 (Bakerganj-3)	Unknown	Abul Hossain Talukdar	
Bakerganj	PE-38 (Bakerganj-4)	Unknown	Sharfuddin Ahmed	
Bakerganj	PE-39 (Bakerganj-5)	Unknown	Nurul Haque	
Bakerganj	PE-40 (Bakerganj-6)	Unknown	Mujibur Rahman Mollah	
Bakerganj	PE-41 (Bakerganj-7)	Unknown	Abdur Rahman Biswas	
Bakerganj	PE-42 (Bakerganj-8)	Unknown	Syed Abdul Bari	
Bakerganj	PE-43 (Bakerganj-9)	Unknown	Abdul Jalil Khan	
Bakerganj	PE-44 (Bakerganj-10)	Unknown	Muhammad Abdus Sobhan	
Bakerganj	PE-45 (Bakerganj-11)	Unknown	Gopal Chandra Basu	
Bakerganj	PE-46 (Bakerganj-12)	Unknown	Abdul Majid Jomaddar	
Bakerganj	PE-47 (Bakerganj-13)	Unknown	Hatem Ali	
Khulna	PE-48 (Khulna-1)	Unknown	Altaf Hossain	
Khulna	PE-49 (Khulna-2)	Unknown	Mozammel Hossain	
Khulna	PE-50 (Khulna-3)	Unknown	Abul Hossain	
Khulna	PE-51 (Khulna-4)	Unknown	Taj Mahmud Sardar	
Khulna	PE-52 (Khulna-5)	Unknown	Sheetal Prasad Roy	
Khulna	PE-53 (Khulna-6)	Unknown	Kamruddin Ahmed	
Khulna	PE-54 (Khulna-7)	Unknown	Majibur Rahman Gain	
Jessore	PE-55 (Jessore-1)	Unknown	Gazi Abdul Latif	
Jessore	PE-56 (Jessore-2)	Unknown	Mashiul Azam Khan	
Jessore	PE-57 (Jessore-3)	Unknown	Nur Ali	
Jessore	PE-58 (Jessore-4)	Unknown	Ahad Ali Khan	
Jessore	PE-59 (Jessore-5)	Unknown	Muhammad Jinnat Ullah	
Jessore	PE-60 (Jessore-6)	Unknown	Bashiruddin Ahmed Majmadar	
Kushtia	PE-61 (Kushtia-1)	Unknown	Mohammad Aliul Hayat	
Kushtia	PE-62 (Kushtia-2)	Unknown	Mofizuddin Ahmed	
Kushtia	PE-63 (Kushtia-3)	Unknown	Yusuf Ali Mia	
Faridpur	PE-64 (Faridpur-1)	Unknown	A. K. Asad	
Faridpur	PE-65 (Faridpur-2)	Unknown	A. M. Fazlul Karim	
Faridpur	PE-66 (Faridpur-3)	Unknown	Abdul Ali	
Faridpur	PE-67 (Faridpur-4)	Unknown	Muhammad Adaluddin Howlader	
Faridpur	PE-68 (Faridpur-5)	Unknown	Modaswar Ali Mia	
Faridpur	PE-69 (Faridpur-6)	Unknown	Rakhm Sarkar Biswas	
Faridpur	PE-70 (Faridpur-7)	Unknown	Majibur Rahman	
Faridpur	PE-71 (Faridpur-8)	Unknown	Lutfur Rahman Howlader	
Faridpur	PE-72 (Faridpur-9)	Unknown	Serajuddin Ahmed	
Faridpur	PE-73 (Faridpur-10)	Unknown	Abdul Karim Dewan	
Dhaka	PE-74 (Dhaka-1)	Unknown	Abdul Karim Bepari	
Dhaka	PE-75 (Dhaka-2)	Unknown	Daulat Mia	
Dhaka	PE-76 (Dhaka-3)	Unknown	Lutfur Rahman Kabira	
Dhaka	PE-77 (Dhaka-4)	Unknown	Ajhar Uddin Ahmed	
Dhaka	PE-78 (Dhaka-5)	Unknown	Abdur Rahman	
Dhaka	PE-79 (Dhaka-6)	Unknown	Asgar Hossain	
Dhaka	PE-80 (Dhaka-7)	Unknown	Abdul Mannan	
Dhaka	PE-81 (Dhaka-8)	Unknown	Bazlur Rahman	
Dhaka	PE-82 (Dhaka-9)	Unknown	S. K. Khairuddin	
Dhaka	PE-83 (Dhaka-10)	Unknown	Mofazzal Hossain	
Dhaka	PE-84 (Dhaka-11)	Unknown	Abdul Awwal	
Dhaka	PE-85 (Dhaka-12)	Unknown	M. A. Zahir	
Dhaka	PE-86 (Dhaka-13)	Unknown	Abdul Gaffar Dewan	
Dhaka	PE-87 (Dhaka-14)	Unknown	Nizamuddin Bhuiyan	
Dhaka	PE-88 (Dhaka-15)	Unknown	Afsaruddin Ahmad	
Mymensingh	PE-89 (Mymensingh-1)	Unknown	Mirza Nurul Huda	
Mymensingh	PE-90 (Mymensingh-2)	Unknown	Khurram Khan Panni	
Mymensingh	PE-91 (Mymensingh-3)	Unknown	Abdul Hamid Chowdhury	
Mymensingh	PE-92 (Mymensingh-4)	Unknown	Mirza Amzad Hossain	
Mymensingh	PE-93 (Mymensingh-5)	Unknown	Riazuddin Talukdar	
Mymensingh	PE-94 (Mymensingh-6)	Unknown	Naimuddin Ahmed	
Mymensingh	PE-95 (Mymensingh-7)	Unknown	Samidul Haque	
Mymensingh	PE-96 (Mymensingh-8)	Unknown	Abdul Hamid	
Mymensingh	PE-97 (Mymensingh-9)	Unknown	Syed Hasan Ali Chowdhury	
Mymensingh	PE-98 (Mymensingh-10)	Unknown	Shahabuddin	
Mymensingh	PE-99 (Mymensingh-11)	Unknown	Munshi Haque Akand	
Mymensingh	PE-100 (Mymensingh-12)	Unknown	Md. Abdul Halim	
Mymensingh	PE-101 (Mymensingh-13)	Unknown	Abdul Jalil Mia	
Mymensingh	PE-102 (Mymensingh-14)	Unknown	Muhammad Muzaffar Uddin Bhuiyan	
Mymensingh	PE-103 (Mymensingh-15)	Unknown	Abdul F. Muhammad Nurullah	
Mymensingh	PE-104 (Mymensingh-16)	Unknown	Sharfuddin Ahmed	
Mymensingh	PE-105 (Mymensingh-17)	Unknown	Mosleh Uddin Ahmed	
Mymensingh	PE-106 (Mymensingh-18)	Unknown	Muzaffar Uddin Bhuiyan	
Mymensingh	PE-107 (Mymensingh-19)	Unknown	Jasimuddin Ahmed	
Mymensingh	PE-108 (Mymensingh-20)	Unknown	Abdur Razzak	
Mymensingh	PE-109 (Mymensingh-21)	Unknown	Abdul Khaleq	
Sylhet	PE-110 (Sylhet-1)	Unknown	Abdul Hakim Chowdhury	
Sylhet	PE-111 (Sylhet-2)	Unknown	Abu Hanifa Ahmed	
Sylhet	PE-112 (Sylhet-3)	Unknown	Abul Mohsin Kazi	
Sylhet	PE-112 (Sylhet-4)	Unknown	Abdul Hay Azad	
Sylhet	PE-113 (Sylhet-5)	Unknown	Saiful Alam	
Sylhet	PE-114 (Sylhet-6)	Unknown	Dewan Abdur Rab Choudhury	
Sylhet	PE-115 (Sylhet-7)	Unknown	Abdul Salam	
Sylhet	PE-116 (Sylhet-8)	Unknown	Ali Jafar Khan	
Sylhet	PE-117 (Sylhet-9)	Unknown	Inamullah	
Sylhet	PE-118 (Sylhet-10)	Unknown	Syed Mahibul Hasan	
Sylhet	PE-119 (Sylhet-11)	Unknown	Abdul Bari	
Sylhet	PE-120 (Sylhet-12)	Unknown	Amiruddin	
Comilla	PE-122 (Comilla-1)	Unknown	Muhammad Manjur Ali	
Comilla	PE-123 (Comilla-2)	Unknown	Abdul Hai	
Comilla	PE-124 (Comilla-3)	Unknown	Dewan Abul Abbas	
Comilla	PE-125 (Comilla-4)	Unknown	Muhammad Harun-ur-Rashid	
Comilla	PE-126 (Comilla-5)	Unknown	Muhammad M. A. Latif	
Comilla	PE-127 (Comilla-6)	Unknown	Mafizuddin Ahmad	
Comilla	PE-128 (Comilla-7)	Unknown	Sultan Ahmed	
Comilla	PE-129 (Comilla-8)	Unknown	Abu Riaz Nuruddin Mahmud	
Comilla	PE-130 (Comilla-9)	Unknown	Syed Nawab Ali Chowdhury	
Comilla	PE-131 (Comilla-10)	Unknown	Ahmedullah Mia	
Comilla	PE-132 (Comilla-11)	Unknown	Abdul Mannan Haji	
Comilla	PE-133 (Comilla-12)	Unknown	Abdul Hakim	
Comilla	PE-134 (Comilla-13)	Unknown	Mohammad Hatem Ali	
Comilla	PE-135 (Comilla-14)	Unknown	Hasanuzzaman	
Noakhali	PE-136 (Noakhali-1)	Unknown	Shamsuddin Ahmed Chowdhury	
Noakhali	PE-137 (Noakhali-2)	Unknown	Khair Ahmed	
Noakhali	PE-138 (Noakhali-3)	Unknown	Abdul Malek Ukil	
Noakhali	PE-139 (Noakhali-4)	Unknown	Ali Azam	
Noakhali	PE-140 (Noakhali-5)	Unknown	Mohammad Abdur Rashid	
Noakhali	PE-141 (Noakhali-6)	Unknown	Abdul Wadud	
Noakhali	PE-142 (Noakhali-7)	Unknown	Abul Kabir	
Chittagong	PE-143 (Chittagong-1)	Unknown	Sayedur Rahman	
Chittagong	PE-144 (Chittagong-2)	Unknown	Aslam Mia	
Chittagong	PE-145 (Chittagong-3)	Unknown	Mirza Abu Ahmed	
Chittagong	PE-146 (Chittagong-5)	Unknown	Abdul Jalil Chowdhury	
Chittagong	PE-147 (Chittagong-6)	Unknown	Ahmed Kabir Chowdhury	
Chittagong	PE-148 (Chittagong-7)	Unknown	Zakerul Haque Chowdhury	
Chittagong	PE-149 (Chittagong-9)	Unknown	A. K. M. Fazlul Kabir Chowdhury	
Chittagong	PE-150 (Chittagong Hill Tracts)	Unknown	Tridev Roy	

== Reserved Women Members ==
Constituency	Party	Member	Source
PE-151 (Dinajpur, Rajshahi, Bogra, Rangpur and Pabna)	Unknown	Shamsunnahar	
PE-152 (Faridpur and Dhaka)	Unknown	Akhtar Jahan Khan	
PE-153 (Mymensingh and Sylhet)	Unknown	Khaleda Habib	
PE-154 (Chittagong, Comilla and Noakhali)	Unknown	Tohfatunnesa Begum	
PE-155 (Kushtia, Jessore, Khulna and Bakerganj)	Unknown	Begum Hamiduddin Ahmed	

== Change in Membership ==
- Mohammad Shahidullah, PE-87 Dhaka-14
- Muhammad Bayazeed Khan Panni, Mymensingh-2
- Abdul Awwal Bhuiyan, PE-126 Comilla
- Hamida Chowdhury, PE-151 Dinajpur, Rajshahi, Bogra, Rangpur and Pabna
- M. Abul Khair Siddique, PE-144 Chittagong-4
- Mahfuzul Hossain, PE-17 Bogra-2
- Shafiuddin Ahmed, PE-60 Jessore-6
- Sachipati Thakur, PE-69 Faridpur-6
- Rostom Ali Mia, PE-9 Rangpur-9
- Kazi Abdul Kader, PE-9 Rangpur-9
- Keramat Ali Talukdar, PE-97 Mymensingh-9
- Mohammad Ahmed Ali, Sylhet-5
- Abdul Munim Choudhury, PE-115 Sylhet-6
