= Faruque ministry =

10th Cabinet of East Pakistan (c. 1962)

Ministry of Ghulam Faruque Khan
- 10th Cabinet of East Pakistan
- 1962
- Date formed: 29 May 1962
- Date dissolved: 25 October 1962

People and organisations
- Governor: Ghulam Faruque Khan
- No. of ministers: 10
- Total no. of members: 10
- Member party: Independent politician
- Status in legislature: Nonpartisan 155 / 155 (100%)

History
- Election: 1962
- Outgoing election: 1954
- Legislature term: 3rd East Pakistan Provincial Assembly
- Predecessor: Ataur III
- Successor: Monem I

Faruque ministry was the tenth cabinet formed in the eastern administrative division of Pakistan, East Pakistan. It was formed under the leadership of Ghulam Faruque Khan, governor of East Pakistan, following the 1962 East Pakistan Provincial Assembly election. The cabinet lasted for about four months and was succeeded by the First Monem ministry after Faruque's resignation.

== Background ==
On 7 October 1958, martial law was declared in Pakistan under the directive of Iskander Mirza, Pakistan's interim president, resulting in the dissolution of the Third Ataur ministry and the Provincial Assembly of East Pakistan. In 27 October, Mirza transferred his position to field marshal Ayub Khan. In an indirect referendum held on 14 February 1960, Khan was elected president for a five-year term. On 1 March 1962, Khan promulgated the new constitution of Pakistan as president. The provincial election was held on 6 May 1962, and 155 members were elected to the Provincial Assembly. The following day, Azam Khan, the governor of East Pakistan, resigned, with the resignation announced to take effect on 11 May 1962.

On 11 May 1962, it was reported that president Khan and the new provincial governor Ghulam Faruque Khan were searching for suitable individuals for the new cabinet and preparing a proposed list. In 29 May, Md. Hafizur Rahman was sworn in as finance minister of the province. In 6 June, A. T. M. Mustafa took oath as law minister. On 13 June 1962, it was reported from reliable sources that the cabinet might be completed before 19 June. In 25 June, six more members were announced, with further additions to the cabinet expected. The new members were sworn in the following day. Later, Khwaja Hassan Askari became a member to the cabinet.

== Dissolution ==
On 25 October 1962, Abdul Monem Khan was announced as the new governor of the province, with his term expected to begin in 28 October. According to the new constitution, the previous cabinet was dissolved upon the Monem's swearing-in, after which he began discussions regarding potential members of a new cabinet. In 29 October, a new cabinet was formed with 9 members from the former governor's cabinet.

== Members ==
The cabinet was composed of the following ministers:

Cabinet members
Portfolio	Minister	Took office	Left office
Home Affairs, General Administration, Services, and Planning Department	Ghulam Faruque Khan	11 May 1962	25 October 1962
Finance Department	Md. Hafizur Rahman	29 May 1962	25 October 1962
Law, Information and Broadcasting Department	A. T. M. Mustafa	6 June 1962	25 October 1962
Education Department	Mafizuddin Ahmad	25 June 1962	25 October 1962
Industry and Commerce Department	Syed Hasan Ali Chowdhury	25 June 1962	25 October 1962
Food and Agriculture Department	Kazi Abdul Kader	25 June 1962	25 October 1962
Public Works, Irrigation, and Power Department	Bashiruddin Ahmad Majmadar	25 June 1962	25 October 1962
Health, Social Welfare, and Basic Democracies Department	Bhawani Sankar Biswas	25 June 1962	25 October 1962
Revenue Department	Abdus Salam	25 June 1962	25 October 1962
Communication and Transport Department	Khwaja Hassan Askari		25 October 1962
