= First Monem ministry =

Eleventh cabinet of East-Pakistan

First Ministry of Abdul Monem Khan
- 11th Cabinet of East Pakistan
- 1962–1965
- Date formed: 29 October 1962
- Date dissolved: 29 March 1965

People and organisations
- Governor: Abdul Monem Khan
- No. of ministers: 8
- Ministers removed: 4
- Total no. of members: 12
- Member party: PMLC
- Status in legislature: Majority 124 / 155 (80%)
- Opposition party: AL; NAP; CML; NDF
- Opposition leader: Afsaruddin Ahmad

History
- Election: 1962
- Outgoing election: 1954
- Legislature term: 3rd East Pakistan Provincial Assembly
- Predecessor: Faruque
- Successor: Monem II

The First Monem ministry was the eleventh cabinet formed in East Pakistan, the former eastern administrative wing of Pakistan. It was established under the leadership of Abdul Monem Khan, the governor of East Pakistan, during the 1962 East Pakistan Provincial Assembly election. The cabinet lasted for approximately two and a half years.

== Background and dissolution ==
On 25 October 1962, Abdul Monem Khan was appointed as the new governor of East Pakistan, and it was announced that his tenure would begin in 28 October. Under the new Constitution, the previous Faruque ministry was dissolved following the governor's oath-taking, and Monem began discussions regarding the possible members of a new cabinet. In 29 October, a new cabinet was formed comprising nine members of the former governor's ministry. On 4 March 1963, two members of the cabinet resigned. In August of the same year, cabinet member A. T. M. Mustafa was nominated as a member of the federal cabinet of Pakistan. On 12 March 1964, minister Abdus Salam resigned. The following day, three more members were added to the cabinet, after which it was reorganized. After winning the 1965 Pakistani presidential election, Ayub Khan was announced president of Pakistan for the second time. On Republic Day of the same year, Khan was sworn in as president. As a result, Monem's tenure as governor ended, along with the tenure of his ministers.

== Members ==
Cabinet members
Portfolio	Minister	Took office	Left office
Home, General Administration, Law, Publicity, Information and Services Department	Abdul Monem Khan	29 October 1962	29 March 1965
Finance and Planning Department	Md. Hafizur Rahman	29 October 1962	29 March 1965
Education Department	Mafizuddin Ahmad	29 October 1962	29 March 1965
Food, Agriculture and Cooperatives Department	Kazi Abdul Kader	29 October 1962	29 March 1965
Health, Social Welfare and Basic Democracies Department	Bhawani Sankar Biswas	29 October 1962	29 March 1965
Communications and Transport Department	Khwaja Hassan Askari	29 October 1962	29 March 1965
Industries and Commerce Department	Dewan Abdur Rab Choudhury	13 March 1964	29 March 1965
Public Works, Irrigation and Power Department	Sultan Ahmed	13 March 1964	29 March 1965
Revenue Department	Fazlul Bari	13 March 1964	29 March 1965

== Former members ==
Cabinet members
Portfolio	Minister	Took office	Left office
Public Works, Irrigation and Power Department	Bashiruddin Ahmad Majamdar	29 October 1962	4 March 1963
Industries and Commerce Department	Syed Hasan Ali Chowdhury	29 October 1962	4 March 1963
Law, Publicity and Information Department	A. T. M. Mustafa	29 October 1962	31 August 1963
Revenue Department	Abdus Salam	29 October 1962	12 March 1964
