= Bhawani Sankar Biswas =

Bangladeshi politician (1918–2011)

- ভবানী শংকর বিশ্বাস

Provincial Minister of East Pakistan
- In office 1962–1965
- Governor: Ghulam Faruque Khan; Abdul Monem Khan
- Portfolio: Health, Labour and Social Welfare
- Preceded by: Dhirendranath Datta; Muhammad Mansur Ali
- Succeeded by: Sultan Ahmed

Member of the East Pakistan Provincial Assembly
- In office 1962–1965
- Leader: A. T. M. Mustafa; Md. Hafizur Rahman
- Constituency: PE-69 (Faridpur-VI)
- In office 1954–1958
- Leader: Abu Hussain Sarkar; Ataur Rahman Khan
- Constituency: Faridpur South-West

Personal details
- Born: 1918 Faridpur District, Bengal Presidency, British India
- Died: 27 January 2011 (aged 92–93)
- Party: Independent
- Education: University of Calcutta
- Occupation: Politician

Bhawani Sankar Biswas (1918 - 2011) was a Bangladeshi politician who advocated for the introduction of separate electorates for Hindus and a quota system for the Scheduled Castes. He served as a provincial minister of East Pakistan prior to the independence of Bangladesh.

== Biography ==
Biswas was born in 1918 in Majhigati village, Faridpur District, Bengal Presidency, British India (in present-day Muksudpur Upazila, Gopalganj District, Bangladesh). After studying at Orrakandi M.E. High School and Narail Victoria College, he earned his bachelor's degree in 1944 from Government Fazlul Huq College, affiliated with the University of Calcutta that time.

After completing his education, Biswas chose teaching as his profession. During his career, he served as the founding headmaster of Dighargati High School and Haldhar Institute High School, and played a role in the establishment of Chanderhat High School in Bagerhat. Following the partition of India in 1947, he was involved in efforts aimed at preventing the migration of religious minorities from Pakistan and mitigating communal violence.

In the 1954 provincial election, he contested as an independent candidate and was elected a member of the East Bengal Legislative Assembly. In the assembly, he was elected deputy leader of the Scheduled Communities Parliamentary Party. He was re-elected as an independent member to the East Pakistan Provincial Assembly in the 1962 provincial election. Later that year, he became an associate member of the Convention Muslim League. From 1962 to 1965, Biswas served as East Pakistan's Minister for Health, Labour and Social Welfare in the cabinets of Faruque and First Monem.

He also contested the 1970 Pakistani general election from the NE-98 Faridpur-V constituency. Bhawani Sankar Biswas died on 27 January 2011.

== Personal life ==
Biswas's elder son, Dulal Biswas, served as president of the National Federation of Youth Organisations in Bangladesh and was a member of the board of directors of the Youth Welfare Fund under the Ministry of Youth and Sports. His younger son, Subhash Chandra Biswas, a social worker, died in 2024. He also had two daughters. His wife, Renuka Biswas (born 1933), died in 2026.
