= Abdul Hasib =

Bangladeshi judge

Justice of the High Court Division of Bangladesh

Personal details
- Profession: Judge

Abdul Hasib was a Justice of the High Court Division of the Bangladesh Supreme Court.

== Career ==
On 20 January 1992, Abdul Hasib was not made a permanent judge of the High Court Division after serving two years as an additional judge by President Abdur Rahman Biswas. Abdul Hasib had passed a ruling against the government in a case related to the presidential election.

== Death ==
Abdul Hasib died on 3 July 2019. He was buried in Banani graveyard.
