= Sultan Ahmed (Bangladeshi politician) =

Bangladeshi politician

- সুলতান আহমেদ
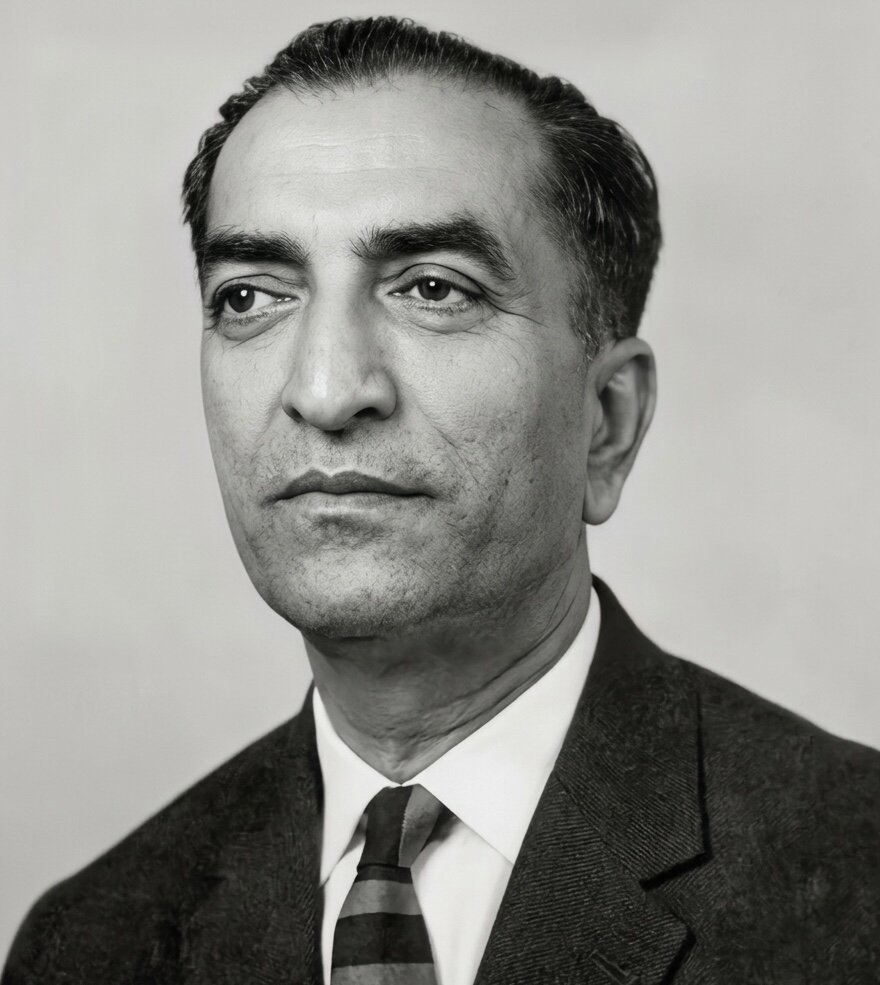

Provincial Minister of East Pakistan
- In office 15 August 1965 – 23 March 1969
- Governor: Abdul Monem Khan
- Ministry: Roads, Water and Railway
- Preceded by: Khwaja Hassan Askari
- Succeeded by: Abdul Motaleb Malik
- In office 29 March 1965 – 9 June 1965
- Governor: Abdul Monem Khan
- Ministry: Health, Labour and Social Welfare
- Preceded by: Bhawani Sankar Biswas
- Succeeded by: Maung Shwe Prue Chowdhury
- In office 13 March 1964 – 22 March 1965
- Governor: Abdul Monem Khan
- Ministry: Public Works, Power and Irrigation
- Preceded by: Bashiruddin Ahmad Majmadar
- Succeeded by: Maung Shwe Prue Chowdhury

Personal details
- Born: 1912 Chittagong District, Bengal Presidency, British India
- Died: 22 February 1977 (aged 64–65) Chittagong, Bangladesh
- Party: BML
- Other political affiliations: PMLC (1962–1969); PML (1947–1958); AIML (pre-1947)
- Profession: Lawyer

Sultan Ahmed (1912–1977) was a Bangladeshi politician and a member of the central working committee of the Bangladesh Muslim League (BML). He served as a member of the East Pakistan Provincial Assembly and held office as a minister in several provincial ministries of East Pakistan.

== Early life ==
Sultan Ahmed was born in 1912 in Chittagong District of the Bengal Presidency, British India, into the family of Khan Bahadur Khalil Ur Rahman. In 1940, Ahmed became a commissioner of the Chittagong Municipality. In 1959, he was elected vice-chairman of the Chittagong District Board, and two years later became a member of the Railway Advisory Board of East Pakistan. He also served as the secretary of the Chittagong branch of the Pakistan Red Crescent Society and as the vice-president of the Chittagong Chamber of Commerce & Industry (CCCI).

== Political career ==
Before 1947, he served as the vice-president of the Chittagong city branch of the Bengal Provincial Muslim League (BPML). He later became the secretary of the Chittagong branch of the BPML and, after the independence of Pakistan, of the East Pakistan Provincial Muslim League (EPML). In the 1954 East Bengal Legislative Assembly election, he contested as a nominee of the Pakistan Muslim League (PML) and was elected. In 1958, his tenure as Secretary of the Chittagong branch of the EPML ended. In the 1962 East Pakistan Provincial Assembly election, he contested as a candidate of the Convention Muslim League (PMLC) and was elected as a member of the East Pakistan Provincial Assembly from a constituency in Chittagong. On 13 March 1964, Ahmed was appointed provincial minister for Public Works, Power and Irrigation of East Pakistan, a position he held until 22 March 1965. He was subsequently appointed provincial minister for Health, Labour and Social Welfare on 29 March 1965. However, he resigned from the post on 9 June 1965. In the 1965 East Pakistan Provincial Assembly election, he was re-elected as a member of the East Pakistan Provincial Assembly. On 15 August of the same year, he was appointed provincial minister for Roads, Water and Railways. He held this office until 1969. After the independence of Bangladesh in 1971, when the Bangladesh Muslim League (BML) was formed, Ahmed joined the newly established party and served as a member of its central working committee and as president of its Chittagong branch.

== Death and legacy ==
Ahmed died on 22 February 1977 at his residence in Chittagong. He was known as a philanthropist. He founded the Khan Bahadur Khalilur Rahman Girls' High School, which is located in the present-day Bengura, Boalkhali Upazila, Chittagong District. He also played a significant role in the establishment of the University of Chittagong, established in 1966. He had six daughters, among whom Noor Jahan Begum was a politician and served as the general secretary of the women's wing of the BML.
