= Abu Sayeed Chowdhury =

President of Bangladesh from 1972 to 1973

- আবু সাঈদ চৌধুরী
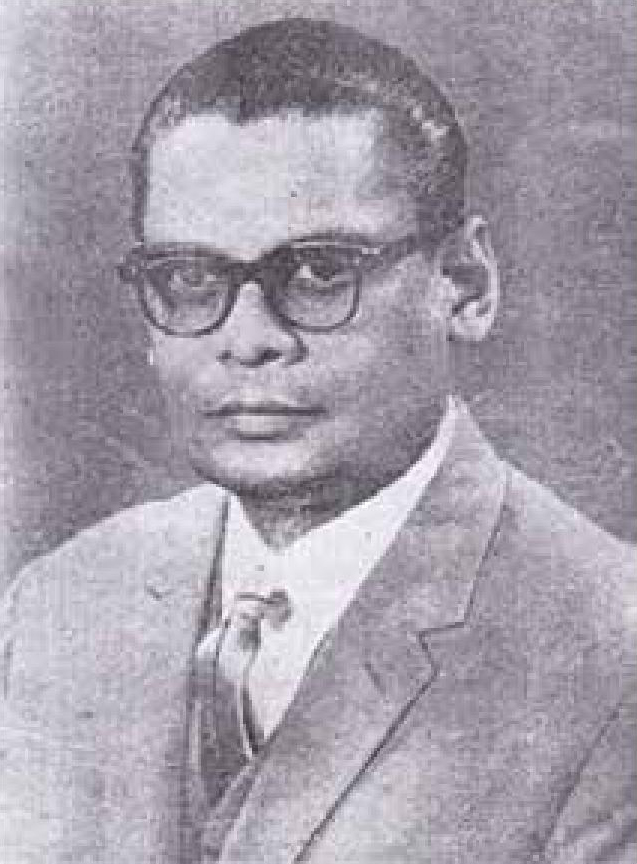
- Chowdhury in 1960

President of Bangladesh
- In office 12 January 1972 – 24 December 1973
- Prime Minister: Sheikh Mujibur Rahman
- Preceded by: Sheikh Mujibur Rahman
- Succeeded by: Mohammad Mohammadullah

Foreign Minister of Bangladesh
- In office 15 August 1975 – 7 November 1975
- President: Khondaker Mostaq Ahmad
- Preceded by: Kamal Hossain
- Succeeded by: Muhammad Shamsul Haque

Chairman of the United Nations Commission on Human Rights
- Preceded by: Pieter Kooijmans
- Succeeded by: Héctor Charry-Samper

Bangladeshi High Commissioner to the United Kingdom
- In office 1 August 1971 – 8 January 1972
- President: Sheikh Mujibur Rahman
- Succeeded by: S.A. Sultan

Vice-Chancellor of the University of Dhaka
- In office 2 December 1969 – 20 January 1972
- Preceded by: M Osman Ghani
- Succeeded by: Syed Sajjad Hussain

Personal details
- Born: 31 January 1921 Nagbari, Bengal, British India
- Died: 2 August 1987 (aged 66) London, England, U.K.
- Party: Awami League
- Children: Abul Hasan Chowdhury
- Parent: Abdul Hamid Chowdhury
- Education: Bindu Basini Govt. Boys' High School; Presidency University, Kolkata; University of Calcutta

Abu Sayeed Chowdhury (Note: Bengali: আবু সায়ীদ চৌধুরী, romanized: Abu Sāyīd Chowdhury [ˈabu ˈʃɑj̯id̪ ˈtʃoʊd̪ʊɾi]) (31 January 1921 – 2 August 1987) was a jurist and the second president of Bangladesh. Besides that, he held the positions of the chairman of the United Nations Commission on Human Rights, the vice-chancellor of the University of Dhaka, the Foreign Minister of Bangladesh, and the first Bangladesh High Commissioner to the UK.

== Early life and education ==
Chowdhury was born on 31 January 1921 to a Bengali Muslim zamindar family in the village of Nagbari in Tangail, Mymensingh district, Bengal Presidency (now Bangladesh). His father, Abdul Hamid Chowdhury, was a former speaker of the East Pakistan Provincial Assembly.

Chowdhury graduated in 1940 from the Presidency College in Calcutta. He obtained his master's and law degrees from the University of Calcutta in 1942, and after the Second World War he completed bar-at-law in London.

== Career ==
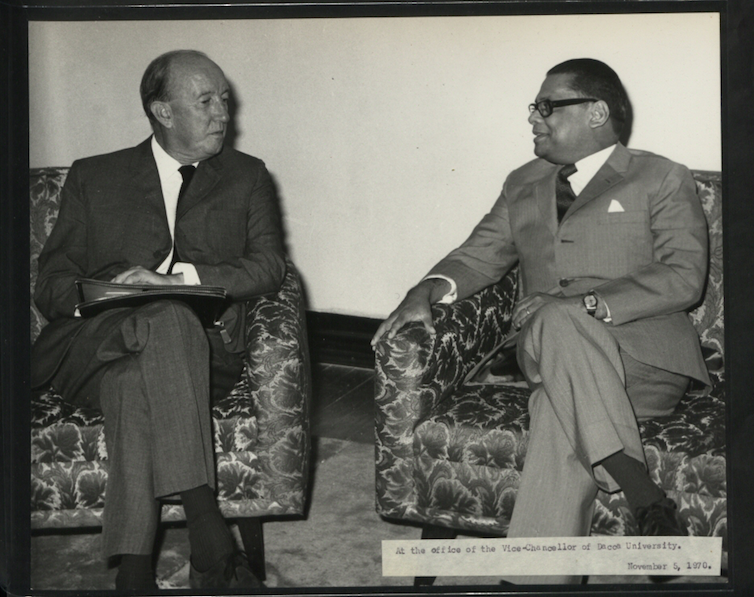
Lord James, leader of the British Educational Survey Team at the office of Chowdhury (1970)

Chowdhury joined the Calcutta High Court Bar in 1947, and after the partition of India, he came over to Dhaka and joined the Dhaka High Court Bar in 1948. In 1960, he was appointed as the advocate general of East Pakistan. He was elevated to the post of Additional Judge of the Dhaka High Court on 7 July 1961 by the then Pakistani President Ayub Khan and was confirmed as judge of the Dhaka High Court after two years. He had been a member of the Constitution Commission (1960–1961) and chairman of the Bengali Development Board (1963–1968).

Chowdhury was appointed as the vice-chancellor of the University of Dhaka in 1969. In 1971, while in Geneva he resigned from the post as a protest against the genocide in East Pakistan by the Pakistan army. From Geneva, he went to the UK and became the special envoy of the provisional Mujibnagar Government. An umbrella organisation, The Council for the People's Republic of Bangladesh in UK was formed on 24 April 1971 in Coventry, UK, by the expatriate Bengalis, and a five-member steering committee of the council was elected by them. He was the High Commissioner for the People's Republic of Bangladesh, London, from 1 August 1971 to 8 January 1972.

=== President of Bangladesh ===
After liberation, Chowdhury returned to Dhaka and was elected as president of Bangladesh on 12 January 1972. On 10 April 1973, he was again elected as president of Bangladesh. In December of the same year he resigned and became special envoy for external relations with the rank of a minister. On 8 August 1975, he was included in the cabinet of Sheikh Mujibur Rahman as minister of ports and shipping. After Mujib was assassinated, he became the minister for foreign affairs in the cabinet of President Khondaker Mostaq Ahmad in August 1975, a position which he held till 7 November the same year.

=== UN Committee ===
In 1978, Chowdhury was elected a member of the United Nations Sub-committee on Prevention of Discrimination and Protection of Minorities. In 1985, he was elected chairman of the UN Human Rights Commission. He was honoured with the insignia of Deshikottam by Visva-Bharati University. Calcutta University awarded him the honorary degree of Doctor of Law.

== Death and legacy ==
Chowdhury died of a heart attack in London on 2 August 1987 and was buried in his village, Nagbari of Tangail.

=== Controversy ===
Right after the assassination of Sheikh Mujibur Rahman, Abu Sayeed Chowdhury joined the cabinet of the new government as the foreign minister and praised the new president, Khondaker Mostaq Ahmad, by saying, "President Khondaker Mostaq Ahmad believes in democracy and he wants to restore democratic atmosphere in the country."

== Books ==
- Probashe Muktijuddher Dinguli
- Manobadhikar
- Human Rights in the Twentieth Century
- Muslim Family Law in the English Courts
