= Abul Hasan Chowdhury =

Bangladeshi politician (born 1951)

- আবুল হাসান চৌধুরী

State Minister of Foreign Affairs
- In office 14 July 1996 – 13 July 2001
- Succeeded by: Reaz Rahman

Member of the Bangladesh Parliament for Tangail-1
- In office 14 July 1996 – 13 July 2001
- Succeeded by: Mohammad Abdur Razzaque
- In office 5 March 1991 – 24 November 1995
- Preceded by: Khandaker Anwarul Haque
- Succeeded by: Abdus Salam Talukder

Personal details
- Born: 15 April 1951 (age 75) Dhaka, East Bengal, Dominion of Pakistan
- Party: Bangladesh Awami League
- Spouse: Nahid Chowdhury
- Children: 2
- Parent: Abu Sayeed Chowdhury (father)
- Relatives: Abdul Hamid Chowdhury (grandfather)
- Education: University of Oxford

Abul Hasan Chowdhury (born 15 April 1951; known as Kaiser) is a Bangladeshi politician. He served as the state minister of foreign affairs and a Jatiya Sangsad member representing the Tangail-1 constituency for two terms.

== Early life and education ==
Chowdhury was born on 15 April 1951 in Dhaka, East Bengal. He belonged to a Bengali Muslim zamindar family from Nagbari in Tangail, then part of Mymensingh district. He is the eldest son of a former president of Bangladesh, Abu Sayeed Chowdhury. His grandfather, Abdul Hamid Chowdhury, was a former speaker of the East Pakistan Provincial Assembly.

After completing his primary and secondary education at St. Gregory's High School in 1968, Chowdhury was admitted to the University of Oxford, where he studied philosophy, politics, and economics and obtained his M.A. in 1976.

== Career ==
Chowdhury joined the Awami League in 1990. He won his first election in 1991 from his ancestral constituency, Madhupur. He was the opposition whip and international affairs secretary of the Awami League from 1991 to 1996, while the party was in opposition. After winning his second election in 1996, he served as the state minister of foreign affairs.

=== Controversy ===
The World Bank pulled out the $1.2 billion funding for the Padma bridge project on the grounds that there was a conspiracy to commit corruption. Abul Hasan Chowdhury, along with a few others, was accused of using connections in order to acquire the project. The Royal Canadian Mounted Police filed a case in Toronto against the accused.

In 2015, the ACC investigated the case of the Padma Bridge Scandal. After the World Bank continuously pushed the government to take action against the alleged perpetrators, after 53 days of investigation, the ACC found nobody to be guilty. On the basis of ACC's report, Dhaka district judge court acquitted all the seven government officials who were alleged to have been involved in the corruption plot. Before that, the ACC exonerated Syed Abul Hossain and Chowdhury from the allegation of involvement in the corruption conspiracy. In 2017, the Canadian court found no proof of the Padma bridge conspiracy, and the Ontario Superior Court acquitted all, dismissing the case.

== Personal life ==
Chowdhury is married to Nahid Chowdhury.
