= Ghughu-danga Zamindar Bari =

Royal residence in Bangladesh

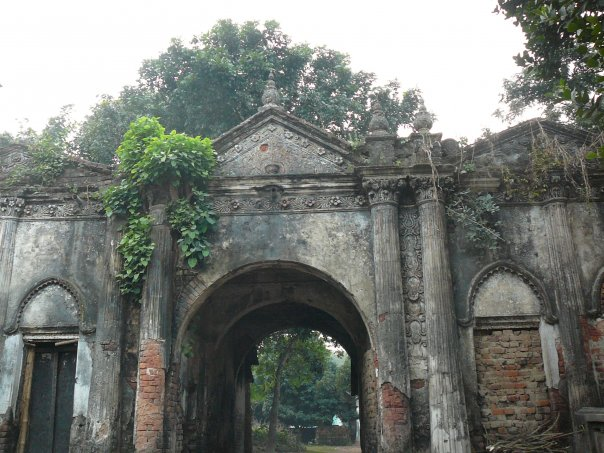
- The Gate
- Created by: Nabir Mohammad
- Present holder: None
- Status: Ruined (1971) during Bangladesh Liberation War

Ghughudanga Zamindar Bari was the residential palace and place of business of the Ghughu-danga zamindar family. It is situated on the banks of the Purnobhoba River in Dinajpur District. The palace was destroyed by Pakistani soldiers in the 1971 Bangladesh Liberation War.

== Location of Ghughudanga ==
The ancient village Ghughudanga is situated on the east side of Purnobhoba River and 8 miles away from Dinajpur Sadar at Auliapur Union. Kotiborsho city was situated there, which was Kotiborsho Nogori and it was the administration center of Guptopal. Later it also known as Debkot. In 1204-05 Muhammad bin Bakhtiyar Khilji after conquering the northern and western parts of Bengal, first established his city in Lakhnauti but later he established his city at Devkot. He came back from his failed Tibet expedition and he died at Devkot. In this Debkot in the reign of Muslim Damdama was erected. But nowadays it is in ruins. Near this ruined city, India's South Dinajpur district's Gangarampur town is situated.

== Ghugudanga Estate ==
During the last part of the British rule, Ghugudanga Estate was the most important amongst the Muslim Zamindars (feudal lords under British Indian Rule) within undivided Dinajpur district of undivided Bengal comprising 30 police stations. It is known that the annual lease rent amount (Land Tax for the British Indian Government only) of this Estate stood to the tune of Rupees one lakh that time. There were 41 Tehsils and about 80 Peyadas (Process Servers) and Barkandaz (Footmen) within Ghugudanga Estate area covering 11 Police Stations. There once stood two old office buildings (Kuthibari) in Eidgah Residential Area just to the east of Dinajpur Bara Maidan of Dinajpur Town; but the main residential building of Zamindar family was built at Ghugudanga village situated on the left bank of the river Punarbhaba which is 6 miles to the south of Dinajpur Town.

Zamindar areas

Ghughudanga Zamindari was located within 11 thanas, such as

- Dinajpur Sadar Upazila
- Gangarampur
- Kushmandi (community development block)
- Raiganj
- Kaliaganj
- Itahar (community development block)
- Pirganj Upazila
- Thakurgaon District
- Biral Upazila
- Bochaganj Upazila
- Malda district (Raio-Muchia).

== Construction ==
It was constructed in the style of Indo-Saracenic Revival architecture.

== Antique pieces ==
In 1971 before the Indo-Pak War, in Ghughudanga state there were some antique pieces and that was gold chair which is now kept in national museum Bangladesh, 101 gram artificial gold koi fish, a beautiful umbrella along with silver haft, a big hand fan along with silver haft, four silver sticks etc. Also there were 13-14 big copper cauldrons for cooking in occasions, big canopy and other important things and that things once used by Dinajpur district's important people in their marriage and other occasions and hired from Ghughudanga. Because those days there were no shop of decorators in Dinajpur, Pakistan. In 1971, Pakistani Army looted these things when they destroyed the Zamindar palace.

== Partition of Bangladesh and destruction of zamindari ==
After the partition of India in 1947, most of the Ghugudanga Estate areas fell within Indian territory. Due to the promulgation of the State Acquisition Act, the financial stability of this Zamindar family started declining gradually. Consequent to the help, co-operation, and shelter afforded to the freedom-fighters by the members of Ghugudanga Zamindar family during the Indo-Pak War or liberation War, raiders completely destroyed the main residential building of the Zamindar by aerial bombing. Afterwards, most members of the Ghugudanga Zamindar family started living by constructing their own houses in Eidgah Residential Area of Dinajpur Town.

== Ghughudanga Zamindar's contribution on 1971's Liberation war ==
On the night of 25 March 1971, after the start of genocide by Pakistan, a camp was established in Ghughudanga with the Bengalis of Dinajpur, Army, EPR, police, 1500 freedom fighters, 22 vehicles and with many weapons. The public and private officers and common people of Dinajpur town took shelter in Ghughudanga Zamindar bari, for fear of the murderous Pakistani Army. The members of the Zamindar family provided for the food and other needs of all the freedom fighters, officers and common people. When Pakistani military came towards Ghughudanga, the members of the Zamindar family and all the common people left Ghughudanga and took refuge in India after crossing the international border. In revenge for helping the freedom fighters, the Pakistani military destroyed this ancient Ghughudanga house. After independence of Bangladesh, family members of Zamindar family returned to Bangladesh.

== Clan Identity ==
The Ghughudanga Zamindar lineage was established by Nabir Mohammad. He came to Patharghata from Jalpaiguri by river for the purpose of business and along with 500 seesa, he established his home and he established his rice business in Kalkata's Chitpur. His son Ful Mohammad Chowdhury bought many estates and from Patharghata he established his Zamindari Cottage.

== Prominent personalities ==
- Moinuddin Ahmed Chowdhury
