= Gamiruddin Pradhan =

Bangladeshi politician (1918–1981)

- গমির উদ্দিন প্রধান

Speaker of the East Pakistan Provincial Assembly
- In office 1968–1969
- Preceded by: Abdul Hamid Chowdhury
- Succeeded by: legislature dissolved

Deputy Speaker of the East Pakistan Provincial Assembly
- In office 1962–1968
- Preceded by: Syed Ziaul Ahsan
- Succeeded by: Masihul Azam Khan

Personal details
- Born: 1918 Jalpaiguri district, Bengal Presidency, British India
- Died: 15 June 1981 (aged 62–63) PG Hospital, Dacca, Bangladesh
- Resting place: Banani graveyard
- Party: BML(S)
- Other political affiliations: BML (1976–1978); PML(C) (1962–1971); PML (1947–1958); AIML (pre-1947)
- Spouse: Shamsun Nahar Pradhan
- Children: Shafiul Alam Pradhan
- Relatives: Tasmia Pradhan (granddaughter)

Gamiruddin Pradhan was a Bangladeshi politician and the Speaker of the East Pakistan Provincial Assembly.

== Early life ==
Pradhan was born in 1918 in Tokrabhasha, Jalpaiguri district, Bengal Presidency, British India (situated in present-day Debiganj Upazila of Panchagarh District, Bangladesh). He obtained his honors in law in 1942 and began his career in 1944 as a lawyer at the Jalpaiguri district court. Before the partition of India, he served as the Vice Chairman of the Jalpaiguri District Board.

== Career ==
After the independence of Pakistan in 1947, he became the president of the Pakistan Muslim League (PML). After serving as a member of the Dinajpur District Board until 1958, he was elected as the Deputy Speaker of the East Pakistan Provincial Assembly in 1962. In 1968, he became the Speaker of the East Pakistan Provincial Assembly and held the position until 1969. Following the 1969 East Pakistan mass uprising, he was appointed president of the East Pakistan branch of the Convention Muslim League (PMLC). In the 1970 Pakistani general election, he contested from the NE-13 Dinajpur-1 constituency as a PMLC candidate but lost, receiving 4,399 votes. In January 1971, he resigned from the presidency of the provincial PMLC. After the independence of Bangladesh, he joined the Bangladesh Muslim League (BML). However, in 1978, ahead of the second presidential election, when party president Khan A Sabur expelled Shah Azizur Rahman from the BML for supporting Nationalist Front of President Ziaur Rahman, Pradhan also left the party. Later, he served as the General Secretary of the faction of the BML led by Badruddin Ahmed Siddiky.

== Personal life and death ==
On 15 June 1981, Gamiruddin Pradhan passed away at PG Hospital in Dacca, Bangladesh (present-day Bangladesh Medical University, Dhaka) after suffering from jaundice. He was later buried at Banani graveyard in Dacca. His son Shafiul Alam Pradhan, passed away in 2017, was a politician who participated in the Bangladesh Liberation War and was the founding president of the Jatiya Ganotantrik Party (JaGPa). Pradhan's granddaughter Tasmia Pradhan, is the incumbent and third president of the JaGPa and a barrister, while his grandson Al Rashed Pradhan is the party's current vice-president and a professional engineer.
