= Banani graveyard =

Cemeteries in Dhaka, Bangladesh

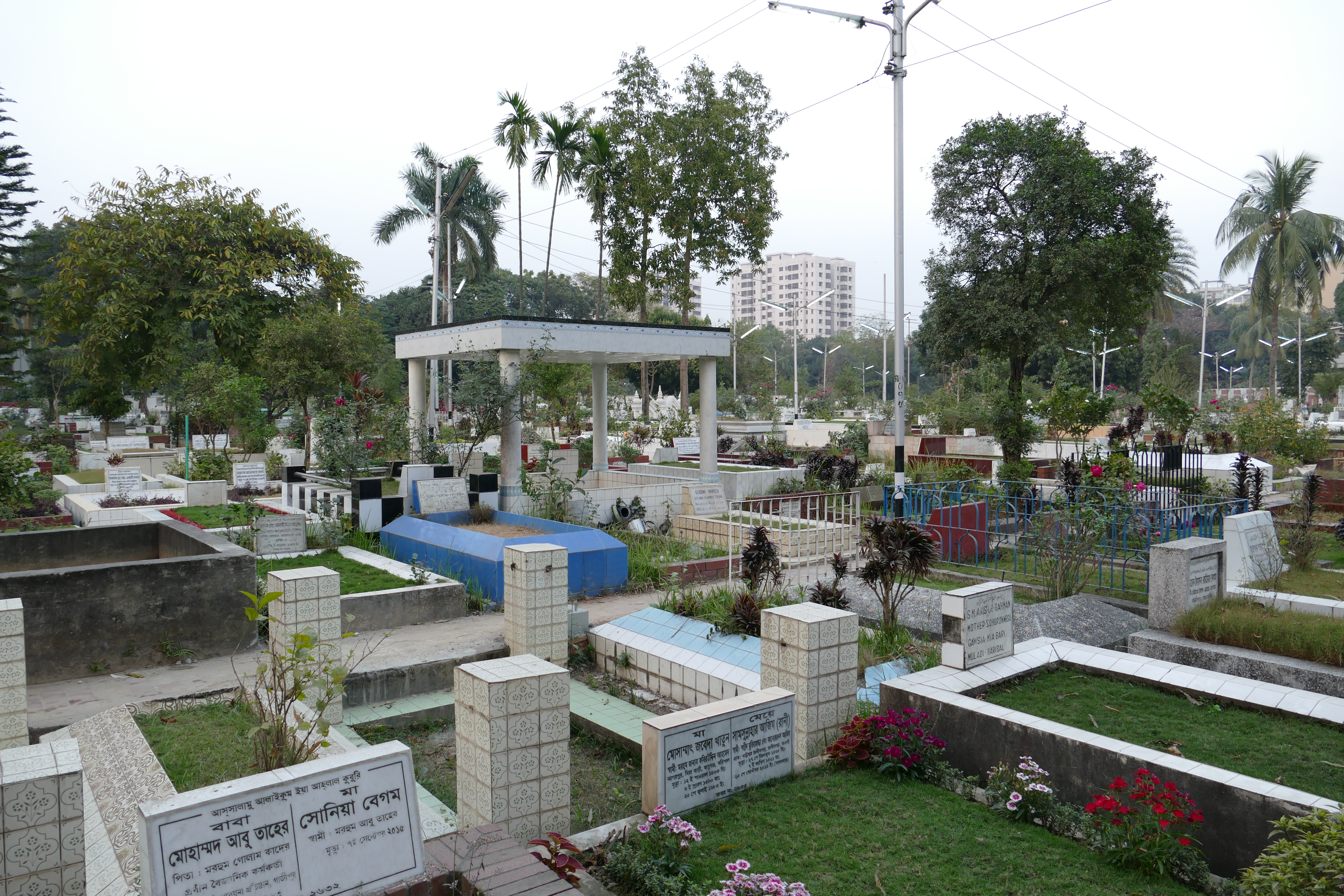
- Banani graveyard
- Interactive map of Banani graveyard

Details
- Established: 1973
- Location: Banani, Dhaka
- Country: Bangladesh
- Coordinates: 23.7990°N 90.4037°E
- Type: Islamic
- Owned by: Dhaka North City Corporation
- Size: 10 acres (4.0 ha)
- No. of graves: 22,000

The Banani graveyard (Bengali: বনানী কবরস্থান) is a cemetery in the Banani neighbourhood of Dhaka. It is one of eight state-run graveyards in Dhaka and, with a capacity for around 22,000 graves, one of the largest graveyards in that city. It covers approximately 10 acres and two to three burials take place every day. Banani graveyard is the resting place for a number of notable Bangladeshis, amongst them the victims of the coup d'ètat of 15 August 1975. The graveyard was established in 1973.

== History ==
The whole land which today comprises the graveyard was owned by the family of Abdul Monem Khan, the former Governor of East Pakistan. After the Liberation of Bangladesh in 1971, the land owned by the family was taken by the government of Bangladesh (except a small portion) and the graveyard was established.

== Notable interments ==
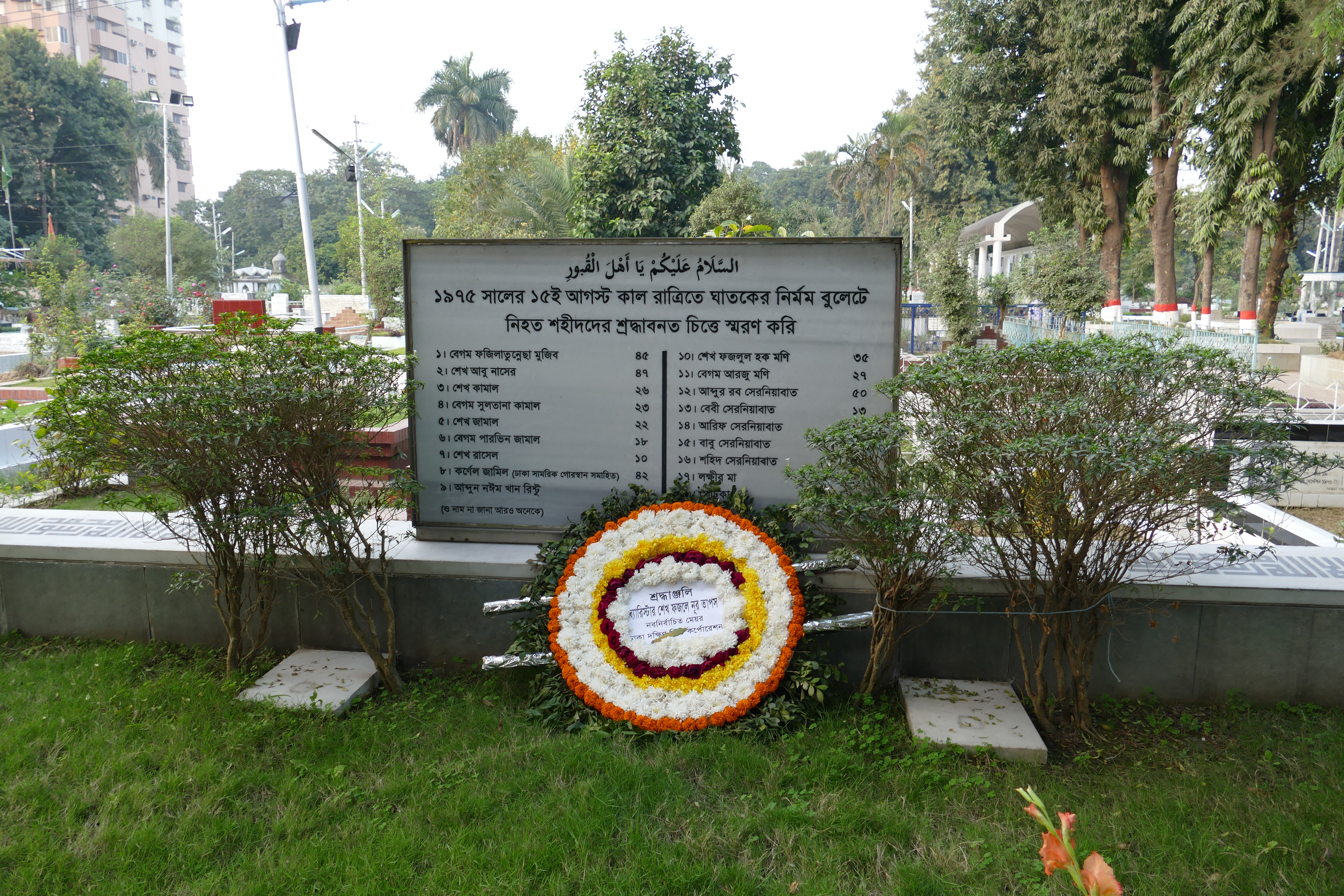
Grave of the victims of 15 August 1975 Bangladeshi coup d'état

=== A ===
- Oli Ahad
- Gazi Shahabuddin Ahmed
- Iajuddin Ahmed
- Tazin Ahmed
- Farid Ali (actor)
- M Innas Ali
- T. Ali
- Zubaida Gulshan Ara
- Abdus Samad Azad
- Abdul Alim (Singer)
- A. J. Mohammad Ali

=== B ===
- Nazmul Huda Bachchu
- Anjuman Ara Begum
- Anwara Begum (academic)
- Firoza Begum (singer)
- Abdur Rahman Biswas
- Murtaja Baseer

=== C ===
- Abdul Hye Choudhury
- Ahmed Zaman Chowdhury
- Amin Ahmed Chowdhury
- Mainur Reza Chowdhury
- Abu Osman Chowdhury
- Najma Chowdhury

=== D ===
- Kamal Dasgupta

=== E ===
- Khaleda Ekram

=== F ===
- Fazle Hasan Abed

=== G ===
- Ustad Gul Mohammad Khan

=== H ===
- Md. Mosharraf Hossain
- Faraaz Ayaaz Hossain
- A. K. Faezul Huq
- Annisul Huq
- Kazi Zaker Husain
- A. T. M. Shamsul Huda

=== I ===
- Muhammad Ibrahim
- Mohammad Nurul Islam
- Sirajul Islam (actor)

=== J ===
- Shafaat Jamil

=== K ===
- Zohra Begum Kazi
- A.Z.M. Enayetullah Khan
- Abdul Monem Khan
- M. Hasan Ali Khan
- Mahbub Ali Khan
- Shah A M S Kibria
- KS Firoz

=== M ===
- M. A. Mannan (neurologist)
- Baby Maudud
- Mohammad Moniruzzaman Miah
- Khalid Mahmood Mithu
- Mohammad Mohammadullah
- Mishuk Munier
- Yasmeen Murshed
- Mohammad Farhad

=== P ===
- Gamiruddin Pradhan

=== R ===
- Arafat Rahman
- Hosne Ara Rahman
- Ivy Rahman
- Latifur Rahman
- Latifur Rahman (businessman)
- Shamsur Rahman (poet)
- Zillur Rahman
- Shahnaz Rahmatullah
- Abdur Razzak (actor)

=== S ===
- Sheikh Fazilatunnesa Mujib
- Sheikh Abu Naser
- Sheikh Kamal
- Sultana Kamal Khuki
- Sheikh Jamal
- Sheikh Russel
- Sheikh Fazlul Haque Moni
- Abdur Rab Serniabat
- Saifuddin Ahmed
- Fazal Shahabuddin
- Shegufta Bakht Chaudhuri
- Abdullah-Al-Muti Sharafuddin

=== T ===
- Syeda Zohra Tajuddin
