= Hosne Ara Rahman =

Indian politician

- হোসনে আরা রহমান

10th First Lady of Bangladesh
- In role 10 October 1991 – 9 October 1996
- President: Abdur Rahman Biswas
- Preceded by: Anowara Begum (acting)
- Succeeded by: Anowara Begum

Personal details
- Born: c. 1934
- Died: 17 June 2017 Dhaka, Bangladesh
- Resting place: Banani graveyard
- Party: Bangladesh Nationalist Party
- Spouse: Abdur Rahman Biswas (?–2017; her death)
- Children: 7

Hosne Ara Rahman (Bengali: হোসনে আরা রহমান; c. 1934 – 17 June 2017) was a Bangladeshi public figure, former First Lady of Bangladesh, and the wife of former President Abdur Rahman Biswas. Rahman served as the country's First Lady from 10 October 1991, until 9 October 1996.

Rahman died from complications of old age at United Hospital in Dhaka, Bangladesh, on 17 June 2017, aged 83.

She was also a cousin of Rashed Khan Menon, the Minister for Civil Aviation and Tourism. Her funeral rites were held at the Gulshan Azad Mosque in Gulshan Thana with burial at the Banani Graveyard.

Her widower, Abdur Rahman Biswas, died just months later on 3 November 2017. He was also buried in Banani Graveyard.
