= Bashiruddin Ahmad Majmadar =

Bangladeshi politician and civil servant (1898–1975)

Minister of Public Works, Irrigation and Power of East Pakistan
- In office 25 June 1962 – 4 March 1963
- Governor: Ghulam Faruque Khan; Abdul Monem Khan
- Preceded by: Muhammad Abdul Khaleque
- Succeeded by: Sultan Ahmed

Personal details
- Born: August 1898 Hudamailmari, Jhenaidah subdivision, Jessore District, Bengal Presidency, British India
- Died: 5 April 1975 (aged 76) Dhaka, Bangladesh
- Party: PDP
- Other political affiliations: PMLC (1962–1965); PML (1947–1958); AIML (1941–1947)
- Education: Bachelor's degree in Economics
- Alma mater: Presidency College
- Occupation: Government official; politician

Bashiruddin Ahmad Majmadar (August 1898 – 5 April 1975) was a Bangladeshi civil servant, social worker, and politician who served as Minister of Public Works, Irrigation and Power of East Pakistan from 25 June 1962 to 4 March 1963. He was elected to the East Pakistan Provincial Assembly on two occasions and was a member of several political parties over the course of his career, including the All-India Muslim League, the Convention Muslim League, and the Pakistan Democratic Party.

== Early life ==
Majmadar was born in August 1898 in Hudamailmari village, Jhenaidah subdivision, Jessore District, Bengal Presidency, British India, in the area now comprising Mirzapur Union, Shailkupa Upazila, Jhenaidah District, Bangladesh. He was the son of Naziruddin Ahmed Majmadar and Syeda Karimunnisa. After completing his secondary education at Jhenaidah Adarsha High School, he studied at Presidency College, where he completed his intermediate of arts and obtained a bachelor's degree in economics in 1934.

== Career ==
In 1935, Majmadar entered government service, a position he held until 1941, when he left to begin his political career by joining the All-India Muslim League (AIML). In 1942, he was appointed an honorary magistrate of Bengal Province. He also served as secretary of the Jhenaidah branch of the Central Cooperative Bank. During his time with the AIML, Majmadar rose to the position of assistant secretary and played an active role in the party's campaign during the 1946 provincial election.

Following the independence of Pakistan, he was again appointed an honorary magistrate, thirteen years after partition. During this period, he also served as a member of the Marriage Registration Advisory Board and as vice-president of the Jhenaidah Arts Council.

In the 1962 provincial election, Majmadar was elected to the East Pakistan Provincial Assembly from the PE-60 Jessore-6 constituency. On 25 June of that year, he was appointed Minister of Public Works, Irrigation and Power of East Pakistan. He resigned from the ministerial position on 4 March 1963.

In the 1965 provincial election, Majmadar contested as a rebel candidate, which resulted in his expulsion from the Convention Muslim League (PMLC). Standing as an independent candidate, he was elected from the PE-61 Jessore-6 constituency, defeating PMLC candidate Shafiuddin Ahmed. He subsequently joined the Pakistan Democratic Party (PDP) and contested the 1970 provincial election from the PE-79 Jessore-11 constituency, where he was defeated by A. B. M. Golam Majid of the East Pakistan Awami League.

== Personal life ==
Majmadar's residence was located on Maulana Bhashani Road, Jhenaidah (now Agnibina Road, part of the Chuadanga–Jhenaidah regional highway). He established a higher secondary college in Jhenaidah.

== Death ==
Majmadar died on 5 April 1975 at Dhaka Medical College, Dhaka, Bangladesh.
