= Abu Osman Chowdhury =

Bangladeshi resistance fighter (1936–2020)

- আবু ওসমান চৌধুরী
- Born: 1 January 1936; Faridganj, Bengal, British India
- Died: 5 September 2020 (aged 84); CMH, Dhaka, Bangladesh
- Burial place: Banani Army Graveyard
- Military career
- Allegiance: Bangladesh; Pakistan (Before 1971)
- Branch: Pakistan Army (Before 1971); Bangladesh Army
- Service years: 1958-1975
- Rank: Lieutenant colonel
- Unit: Army Service Corps
- Commands: Commander of Sector – VIII; Director of Army Service Crops
- Conflicts: Indo-Pakistani War of 1965; Bangladesh Liberation War
- Awards: Independence Day Award

Lieutenant Colonel Abu Osman Chowdhury (1 January 1936 – 5 September 2020) was a Bangladeshi war hero and freedom fighter. During the Bangladesh Liberation War, he served as the commander of Sector 8 of the Bangladesh Forces that covered the present-day Kushtia, Jashore, Khulna, Barishal, Faridpur, and Patuakhali regions.

== Background ==
Chowdhury was born on 1 January 1936, in Madnergaon village in present-day Faridganj Upazila of Chandpur District. He passed his matriculation from Chandra Imam Ali High School and College. Later he completed his Intermediate of Arts from Chandpur Government College in 1954. He completed his bachelor's degree at Comilla Victoria College in 1957.

== Military career ==
Chowdhury joined the 6th Officers Training School Course of Officers Training School, Kohat, in January 1958. He was commissioned in the Pakistan Army Army Service Corps on 13 September 1958. He was promoted to Major in April 1968.

=== Role in Bangladesh liberation war ===
In 1971, Chowdhury was posted in Chuadanga, under Kushtia District, as a major in the Pakistan army and the commander of the 4th Wing East Pakistan Rifles (EPR). He left for Kushtia with his family on 23 March 1971 to attend an official meeting. He was staying at Kushtia Circuit House on the night of 25–26 March when the news of Operation Searchlight reached him. Sensing imminent danger, he left Kushtia on the early morning of 26 March 1971 and headed to Chuadanga via Jhenaidah while local political workers had already revolted. Later, Bengali soldiers raised the flag of Bangladesh at EPR 4th Wing Headquarters in Chuadanga. Later the 4th wing of EPR, led by Major Chowdhury and reinforced with police and Ansar personnel and local youth, attacked the 27 Baluch of the Pakistan Army stationed at Kushtia and eliminated almost 2 companies.

In the first sector commander's conference in July, Chowdhury was appointed the commander of the western sector, which comprised Kushtia, Jessore, and areas of Faridpur, including Doulatpur-Satkhira Road encompassed within Khulna.

It was past noon on 26 March when Chowdhury reached his wing headquarters at Chuadanga. There, his NCOs briefed him on the overall situation, including the formal organisation of local resistance in the wake of the crackdown at Dhaka. In the meantime, local Awami League leader Dr Ashab Ul Haq, who had earlier declared war against the occupying Pakistani armed forces the same morning at a public meeting, had contacted him over the telephone and invited him to an emergency meeting with the public leaders and representatives of the local administration. At the meeting, Chowdhury was asked to take charge of the armed resistance force, which he accepted at once. After a long discussion, the first-ever war command of Bangladesh, named South Western Command, was formed on 26 March 1971 in Chuadanga. While Chowdhury was given the position of the commander, Ashab Ul Haq, MPA became the chief advisor and Barrister Abu Ahmed Afzalur Rashid alias Badal Rashid, MNA, and Advocate Yunus Ali, MPA, were made deputy chief advisors. The whole of western region of the Padma was taken under the command comprising that of Kushtia, Faridpur, Jessore, and Khulna districts. All the armed personnel from defence, EPR, police, Ansar, Mujahid and armed student wing of the area were vested under the command. The newly built District Council Dak Bungalow was made the command headquarters. The next day, on 27 March at about noon the Pakistani flag, last flying one at the EPR Wing headquarters was ceremoniously lowered and the tri-colour Bangladesh flag was hoisted at the flag post by Chowdhury. Captain A. R. Azam Chowdhury, his deputy, was there who afterwards played valiant role under the Command. Chowdhury held the position until the division of Bangladesh war commands into 11 sectors by the provisional government on 11 July 1971. The South Western Command was then renamed Sector-8 with some revision of the command area, and Chowdhury continued to hold the position of the sector commander until Major M Abul Manjur took over in September 1971.

=== Post war ===
After the independence of Bangladesh, he was promoted to the rank of lieutenant colonel and was appointed as the director of Army Service Crops. On 7 November 1975, during the 1975 coup, Chowdhury's wife, Nazia Osman, was killed in his Gulshan residence. He retired from the Bangladesh Army as a lieutenant colonel in December 1975.

== Later career ==
In 1996 he was appointed as the chairman of Bangladesh Jute Mills Corporation. He also served as the administrator of Chandpur District Council. In 2014 he was awarded the Independence Day Award for his contribution to the Bangladesh Liberation War.

== Personal life ==
He was married to Nazia Khanum in 1960. They have 2 daughters.

== Books ==
- এবারের সংগ্রাম স্বাধীনতার সংগ্রাম

== Death ==
On 5 September 2020, he died at the Combined Military Hospital in Dhaka from COVID-19. Abu Osman Chowdhury was given a state funeral and buried at Banani Army Graveyard.
