= A. R. Azam Chowdhury =

Bangladeshi military officer

- Born: East Bengal, Dominion of Pakistan
- Military career
- Allegiance: Bangladesh
- Branch: Bangladesh Army
- Rank: Colonel
- Unit: Baloch Regiment
- Conflicts: Bangladesh Liberation War

A. R. Azam Chowdhury was a Bangladeshi military officer and a veteran of the Bangladesh Liberation War. He was a captain under Major Abu Osman Chowdhury in Sector 8, covering Kushtia District, Jhenaidah District, and Chuadanga District. He was awarded Bir Bikrom, the third-highest military award of Bangladesh, given to 175 people.

== Career ==
At the start of the Bangladesh Liberation War in March 1971, Chowdhury served as the deputy to Major Abu Osman Chowdhury, the commander of the 4th wing of the East Pakistan Rifles based in Chuadanga.

After the news of Operation Searchlight in Dhaka on 25 March, they disarmed the non-Bengali soldiers and revolted against the Pakistan Army. On 27 March 1971, following the lowering of the Pakistani flag at the 4th East Pakistan Rifles headquarters, he actively raised the Bangladeshi flag, marking a symbolic declaration of independence.

Chowdhury was involved in organising and leading attacks against the 27th Baluch Regiment of the Pakistan Army in Kushtia. The battles led to significant defeats for the Pakistani forces in the region and contributed to the liberation of Kushtia.

Chowdhury retired from the Bangladesh Army in 2000 as a colonel.
