= Abdul Hamid Chowdhury =

Bengali politician and zamindar (died 1969)

- আব্দুল হামিদ চৌধুরী
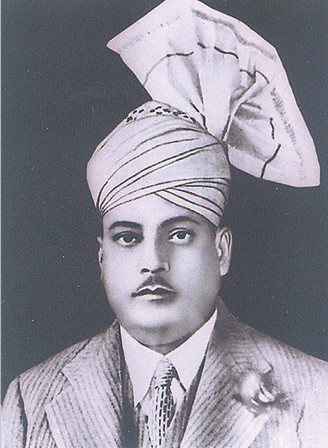

Speaker of the East Pakistan Provincial Assembly
- In office 1962–1967
- Preceded by: Syed Ziaul Ahsan
- Succeeded by: Gamiruddin Pradhan

Deputy President of the Bengal Legislative Council
- In office 1940–1946
- Preceded by: Hamidul Huq Choudhury

Personal details
- Born: 12 January 1896 Tangail, Bengal Presidency, British India
- Died: 4 September 1969 (aged 73) Dacca, East Pakistan, Pakistan
- Party: Convention Muslim League
- Children: Abu Sayeed Chowdhury
- Relatives: Abul Hasan Chowdhury (grandson)

Abdul Hamid Chowdhury (Bengali: আব্দুল হামিদ চৌধুরী; died 4 September 1969) was a Bengali politician and zamindar who was the Speaker of the East Pakistan Provincial Assembly from 1962 to 1968.

== Early life and family ==
Chowdhury was born into a Bengali Muslim zamindar family in the village of Nagbari in Tangail, Mymensingh district, Bengal Presidency. His only son, Abu Sayeed Chowdhury, was a former President of Bangladesh. His grandson, Abul Hasan Chowdhury, was the former State Minister of Foreign Affairs.

== Career ==
Chowdhury served as the Deputy President of the Bengal Legislative Council from 1940 to 1947. After the partition of Bengal in 1947, he served in Calcutta as the deputy high commissioner and as the dean of diplomatic corps on behalf of the Dominion of Pakistan from 1951 to 1953. He served as the Speaker of the East Pakistan Provincial Assembly between 1962 and 1968. Chowdhury was also a member of the Mymensingh District Board for 40 consecutive years, eventually becoming its chairman. He was the first Muslim president of Mymensingh Zilla School's committee and had also served as the director of the National Bank of Pakistan.

== Death ==
Chowdhury died on 4 September 1969 in East Pakistan.
