= Dewan Abdur Rab Choudhury =

Dewan Abdur Rab Choudhury (1909–1983) was a Bangladeshi lawyer who was the zamindar of Gaharpur Pargana in Sylhet District during the British period and later became a provincial minister of East Pakistan.

== Biography ==
Choudhury was born in 1909 in Gaharpur Pargana of Sylhet District, Eastern Bengal and Assam, British India (present-day Balaganj Upazila, Sylhet District, Bangladesh). After graduating from Aligarh Muslim University in 1933, he was appointed a member of the Sylhet Local Board in the same year. In 1937, he joined the Assam branch of the All-India Muslim League and was elected a member of the Assam Legislative Assembly from the Sylhet Sadar South (Muslim) constituency in the 1946 provincial elections. Subsequently, in 1947, the government of Assam nominated Choudhury as an honorary magistrate. However, in the same year, when his party launched a non-cooperation movement against the provincial government, he was made chairman of the movement's Action Committee, and consequently resigned from the position of honorary magistrate. In 1955, he was elected chairman of the Sylhet Municipality and served in that position until 1958. During this period, he also served as acting chairman and then chairman of the Sylhet Local Board before retiring from its membership in 1958. Two years later, he was appointed an honorary magistrate by the government of East Pakistan and served in that position until 1961. In the 1962 provincial election, Choudhury contested and won from constituency PE-115 Sylhet-6, thereby becoming a member of the East Pakistan Provincial Assembly. After the formation of the Convention Muslim League in the same year, he joined the party and became a member of its Central Working Committee. On 13 March 1964, he was appointed East Pakistan's provincial minister for Industries and Commerce. He served in that position for one year. Choudhury died of a heart attack in Dhaka, Bangladesh, on 1 February 1983. After death, he was buried at the Dargah Cemetery of Shah Jalal Dargah in Sylhet. He founded several educational institutions, including Dewan Abdur Rahim High School and College in Gaharpur.
