= Abdur Rahman Biswas =

President of Bangladesh from 1991 to 1996

- আবদুর রহমান বিশ্বাস
- President Abdur Rahman Biswas

President of Bangladesh
- In office 10 October 1991 – 9 October 1996
- Prime Minister: Khaleda Zia; Muhammad Habibur Rahman (acting); Sheikh Hasina
- Preceded by: Shahabuddin Ahmed (acting)
- Succeeded by: Shahabuddin Ahmed

6th Speaker of the Jatiya Sangsad
- In office 5 April 1991 – 25 September 1991
- Deputy: Sheikh Razzak Ali
- Preceded by: Shamsul Huda Chowdhury
- Succeeded by: Sheikh Razzak Ali

Personal details
- Born: 1 September 1926 Bakerganj, Bengal, British India (now Barisal, Bangladesh)
- Died: 3 November 2017 (aged 91) Dhaka, Bangladesh
- Resting place: Banani graveyard, Dhaka
- Party: Bangladesh Nationalist Party (BNP)
- Spouse: Hosne Ara Rahman (?–2017)
- Education: University of Dhaka

Abdur Rahman Biswas (Note: Bengali: আব্দুর রহমান বিশ্বাস, romanized: Abdur Rahman Biswas [ˈabdur ˈɾahmɑn ˈbiswɑs]) (1 September 1926 – 3 November 2017) was a Bangladeshi politician. He was the President of Bangladesh from 1991 to 1996. Biswas represented Pakistan at the United Nations General Assembly, prior to the independence of Bangladesh.

== Early life and education ==
Biswas was born in Shaistabad village, Barisal District. He was educated at the University of Dhaka, where he received BA with honours and an MA in history and a degree in law. His subsequent public service included chairing a local cooperative bank and sponsoring educational initiatives. He joined the legal profession in the 1950s. He was elected president of the Barisal Bar Association twice in the 1970s and worked as a Supreme Court lawyer.

== Career ==
Biswas started his political career when he joined the Muslim League during Ayub Khan's regime. He was elected as a representative to the East Pakistan Legislative Assembly in 1962 and 1965. In 1967, he represented Pakistan at the UN General Assembly. He became chairman of Barisal Municipality in 1977. He became a member of parliament in the 1979 Bangladeshi general election. He served as minister of textiles and jute under the cabinet of President Ziaur Rahman, and later as health minister under President Abdus Sattar. He served as a vice-chairman of the Bangladesh Nationalist Party. He elected as a member of parliament in the 1991 election and soon after got selected as the Speaker of the Parliament. He became Bangladesh's 16th president on 10 September the same year.

For most of his tenure as president, Biswas spent his time reading and meeting dignitaries including Nobel laureate physicist Abdus Salam, Prime Minister of Pakistan, Nawaz Sharif, the Prime Minister of Nepal, Jigme Singye Wangchuck, the King of Bhutan and the Malaysian Prime Minister Mahathir Mohamad. As head of the Caretaker government of Bangladesh, however, he faced challenges from the military and political instability in the country. In 1992, Biswas did not make Abdul Hasib a permanent judge of the High Court Division after he had served two years as an additional judge.

=== February 1996 election ===
From mid-1994, clashes between the BNP backed Jatioabadi Chhatra Dal and Awami League backed Bangladesh Chhatra League led to increasing violence in the form of bomb and arson attacks on party bureaus, newspaper offices and government buildings. In the midst of violence, the opposition led by the Awami League's Sheikh Hasina, pledged to boycott national elections scheduled for 15 February 1996. When Khaleda Zia's BNP was re-elected for the second term in that election, it was boycotted and denounced by the three main opposition parties. On 26 March, in the face of increasing opposition, the newly elected parliament enacted the thirteenth constitutional amendment bill paving the way for the appointment of an interim caretaker government.

=== June 1996 election ===
On 28 March 1996, Biswas signed the Caretaker Government bill into law, which was welcomed by human rights organisations. As a result, Biswas dissolved the newly elected legislature and, as Khaleda Zia stepped down, former Chief Justice Habibur Rahman was appointed as chief adviser to head an interim government that was poised to preside over fresh national elections on 12 June 1996.

=== 1996 coup ===
On 19 May 1996, Biswas, as head of a caretaker government, ordered the army chief Lieutenant General Abu Saleh Mohammad Nasim to force the retirement of Major-General Morshed Khan, commander of Bogra Cantonment, and Brigadier Miron Hamidur Rahman, deputy chief of paramilitary Bangladesh Rifles. Both officers had issued statements expressing dissatisfaction with the country's situation. The President believed that they were involved in political activities with opposition parties. Nasim refused to comply. The next day, Biswas sacked him and sent soldiers to control the state radio and television stations. On noon that day, Nasim ordered soldiers of Bogra, Jessore and Mymensingh divisions to march towards Dhaka. The Ninth Infantry Division's Major General Imamuzzaman, who commanded the division located closest to Dhaka, remained loyal to the President. He directed the removal of all boats and ferries from Jamuna River in Aricha port, so that Bogra and Jessore divisions could not cross the river.

Biswas sent a contingent of troops with tanks to blockade the Dhaka-Mymenshing highway. This prevented Mymensingh Division Army from entering Dhaka. In the meantime, Major General Mohammad Anwar Hossain, General Officer Commanding of the 33rd Infantry Division located in Comilla, also came to the aid of the president. He mobilised a fully geared 101 Infantry Brigade, under the command of Brigadier Shah Ikram (later Major General) to Dhaka to fortify Bangabhaban, the presidential palace. The 33rd Division was deployed, using an Infantry Battalion and a company of tanks from the 7th Horse Armoured Battalion at the Dhaka-Chittagong highway, to create a blockade against the 24th Infantry Division located in Chittagong. The government broadcast announcements asking all soldiers to stay at their own cantonment. After some hours, Mymensingh Division soldiers returned to their barracks. The Chittagong Division never mobilised towards Dhaka. The General Officer Commanding of the Chittagong Division realised that the military coup was highly unlikely to succeed. That night Nasim was interviewed by the BBC and, in reference to troop movements, he said that as Army Chief, he could move troops anytime he wanted. Nasim was arrested by the Brigade Commander of 14 Independent Engineers Brigade and put under house arrest in Army Mess behind Army Central Library, Staff Road, Dhaka Cantonment. Later the Awami League government, which was elected to power in 1996, granted him a formal retirement. Biswas later recalled the events as his "most memorable experience." He stepped down as president on 9 October 1996 and was succeeded by Shahabuddin Ahmed.

== Personal life ==
Biswas was married to Hosne Ara Rahman (1934 – 17 June 2017) a cousin of politician Rashed Khan Menon. Together, they had five sons, Monu Biswas, Ehteshamul Haque Nasim (12 November 1960 – 12 March 1998), Shamsuddoza Kamal Biswas, Jamilur Rahman Shibli Biswas, and Muidur Rahman Romel Biswas, and two daughters Akhi Biswas and Rakhi Biswas.

== Later life ==
After the end of his presidency, Biswas retired permanently from politics. In 2006, during the unfolding crisis, Biswas's house in Barisal was set on fire by Awami League militants.

Biswas died on 3 November 2017 at United Hospital, Dhaka from respiratory problems, aged 91. He was buried in Banani Graveyard on 4 November.
