= Gul Mohammad Khan =

Bangladeshi musician (1876–1979)

- Born: 1876; Tirhut, Darbhanga, Bihar, British India
- Died: 1979 (aged 102–103)

Ustad Gul Mohammad Khan (1876–1979) was a Bangladeshi musician. He was awarded Ekushey Padak in 1977 by the Government of Bangladesh.

== Background ==
Khan's father, Ustad Ahmad Khan, was a singer in the court of the Maharaja. His grandfather, Ustad Namder Khan, was also a musician.

== Career ==
Khan was skilled in Dhrupad and Khyal. He performed at the inauguration ceremony of the Dhaka Radio Centre. Later he joined the institute as a music teacher.

== Awards and honors ==
- Bulbul Academy Award (1965)
- Pride of Performance Award (1971) by the President of Pakistan
- Ekushey Padak (1977)

The Shilpakala Academy held a reception in Khan's honor in 1977.
