= Azahar Uddin Ahmed =

Bangladeshi politician and physician

- আজাহার উদ্দিন আহমদ

Member of Provincial Assembly of East Pakistan
- In office May 1962 – December 1970
- Constituency: Lalmohan-Char Fasson

Personal details
- Born: 13 October 1913 Daulatkhan, Bhola, British India (now Bangladesh)
- Died: 10 January 2011 (aged 97) SBMC Hospital, Barisal, Bangladesh
- Children: Hafizuddin Ahmed
- Parent: Golam Rahman Patwari (father)
- Education: Brojomohun College

Azahar Uddin Ahmed (13 October 1913 – 10 January 2011) was a Bangladeshi politician and physician. He was a member (MLA) and deputy leader of the East Pakistan Provincial Legislative Assembly. In 1970, he was elected a member of the National Assembly of Pakistan.

His son is Major (retd) Hafizuddin Ahmed Bir Bikram.

== Early life ==
Azahar was born on 13 October 1913 in Char Kakra village of North Niamatpur, Daulatkhan, Bhola, then British India. His father's name is Golam Rahman Patwari.

He received primary scholarship in 1924 and junior scholarship in 1927 from Lalmohan Minor School. In 1933, he passed matriculation from Bhola Government School and ISC in 1935 from BM College, Barisal. Passed LMF (Licentiate of Medical Faculty) in 1940.

== Career ==
Azahar Uddin Ahmad was elected member of Provincial Legislative Assembly (MLA) from Lalmohan-Charfasan in 1962, 1963 and 1965. At that time, he served as deputy leader.

In 1970, he was elected a member of the National Assembly on behalf of the All-Pakistan Awami League.

In 1973, Bhola was nominated from JASAD on three seats.

== Death ==
Azahar Uddin Ahmed died of a stroke 10 January 2011 in SBMC Hospital, Barisal, Bangladesh.
