= Old Sangsad Bhaban =

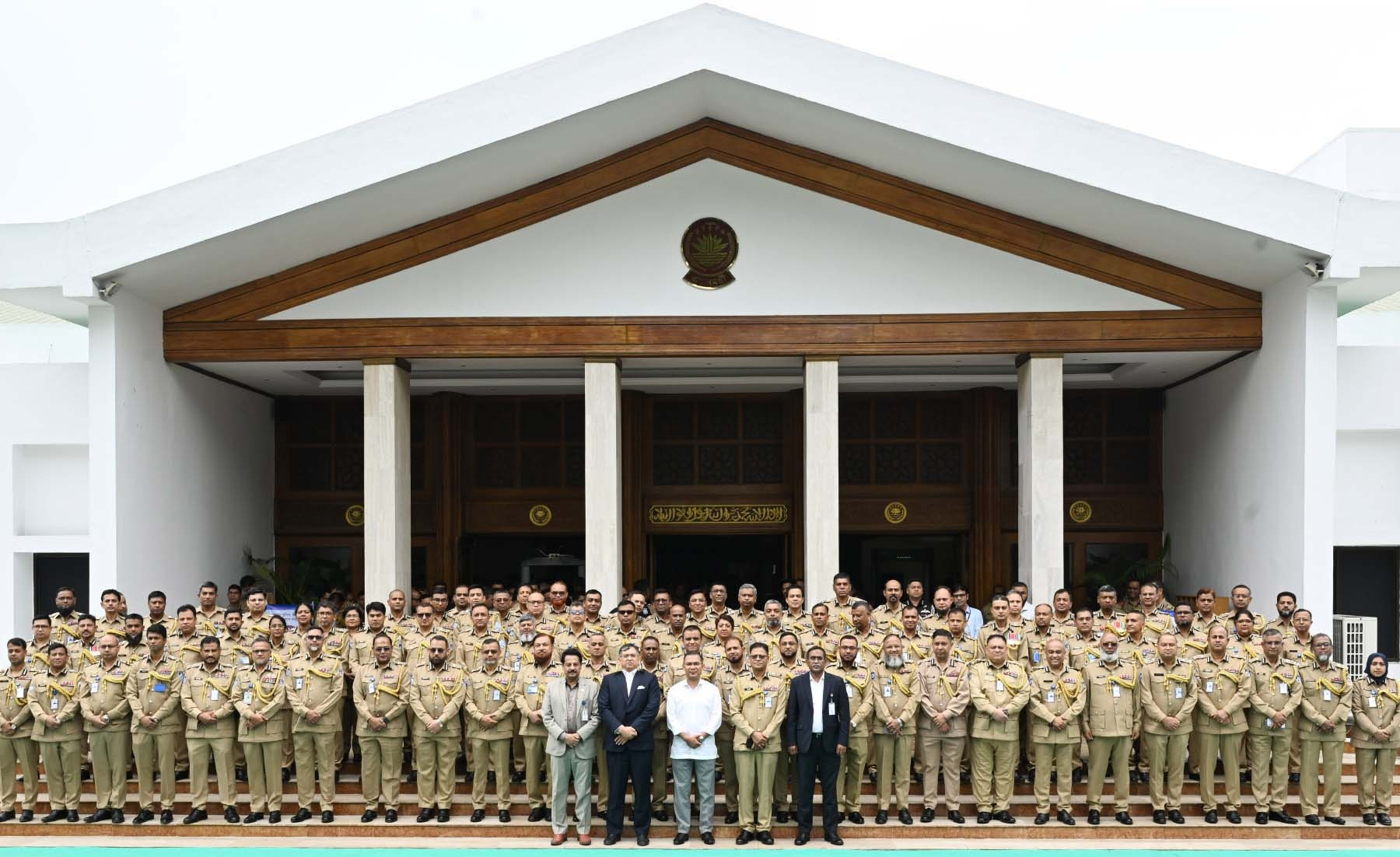
- Bangladeshi Prime Minister Tarique Rahman with senior police officers in front of Old Sangsad Bhaban, 2026
- Interactive map of the Old Sangsad Bhaban area
- Former names: Sangsad Bhaban (1973–1982); Assembly House (1963–1972)

General information
- Type: Legislative building
- Architectural style: Modern
- Location: Tejgaon, Dhaka, Bangladesh
- Coordinates: 23°46′07″N 90°23′30″E
- Current tenants: Prime Minister's Office
- Completed: 1963
- Client: Government of East Pakistan
- Owner: Ministry of Housing and Public Works
- Landlord: Government of Bangladesh

Technical details
- Structural system: Concrete, brick

Design and construction
- Main contractor: Bengal Development Corporation Limited

Old Sangsad Bhaban (lit. 'Old Parliament House') is a government building located in Dhaka, Bangladesh. Completed in 1963, the building initially served as the building of the East Pakistan Provincial Assembly and the National Assembly of Pakistan. After the independence of Bangladesh, it served as the building of the Jatiya Sangsad. It is currently used as the Prime Minister's Office.

== History ==
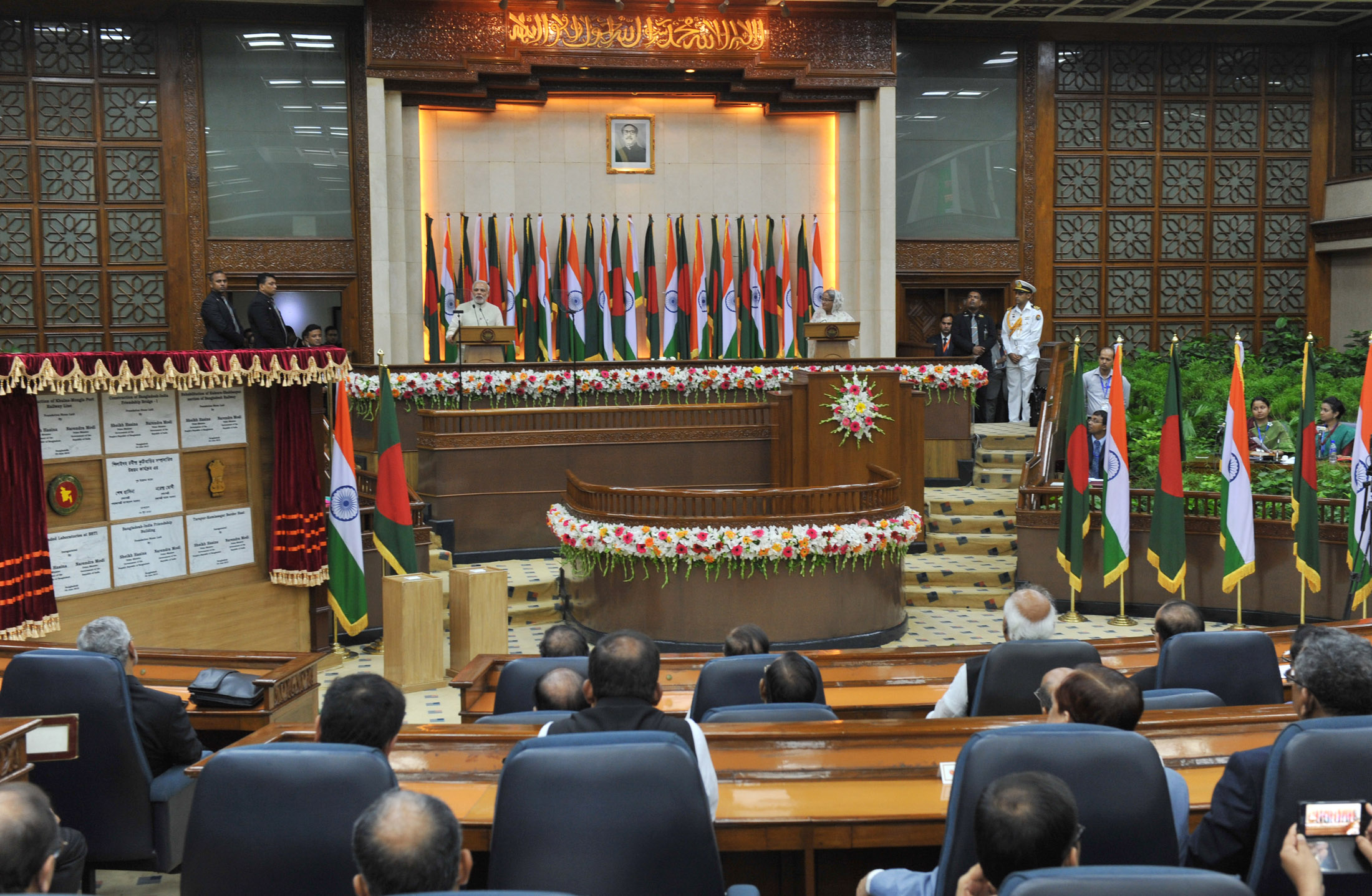
Indian Prime Minister Narendra Modi with former Bangladeshi Prime Minister Sheikh Hasina at the building's Conference hall formerly known as Debate chamber of Jatiya Sangsad in June 2015

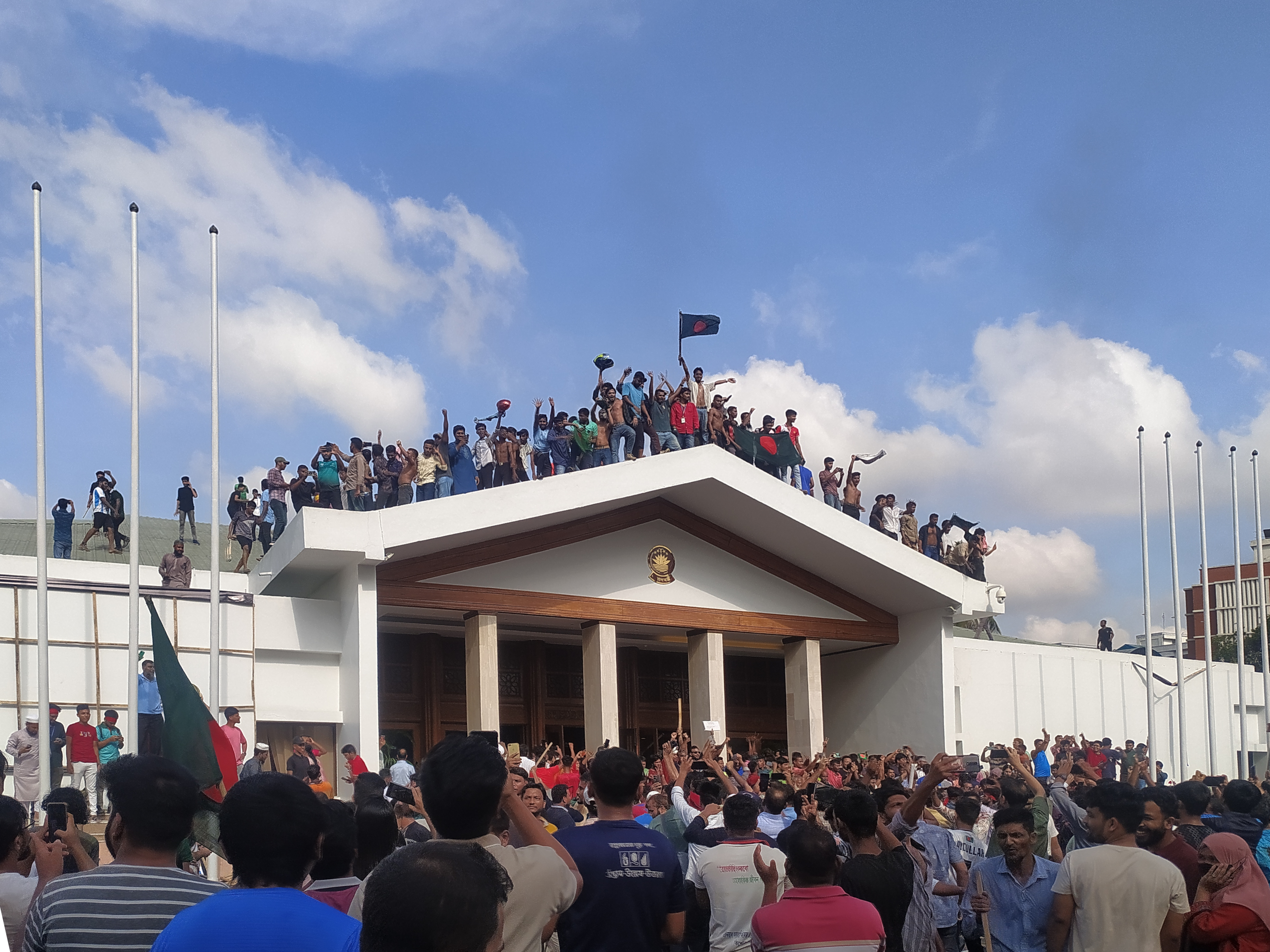
People cheering in front of the building after Sheikh Hasina's resignation in August 2024

Following the partition of India in 1947, a building located in Jagannath Hall, University of Dhaka was designated for the newly established East Bengal Legislative Assembly (later the East Pakistan Provincial Assembly). On 27 November 1962, construction of a new 500-seat assembly building near Tejgaon began, with a target completion date set before the date of the next session of the East Pakistan Provincial Assembly. Bengal Development Corporation Limited was involved in the main construction work of the building. A 125-ton refrigeration-capacity Worthington semi-hermetic centrifugal compressor system chiller was planned for use in the building. The hall of the new assembly building was completed before 16 January 1963. In 17 January, the third session of the third term of the East Pakistan Provincial Assembly was held in the hall. In 25 November, a session of the National Assembly of Pakistan was held in the assembly building. In 1971, during Bangladesh Liberation War, it was used as the headquarters of the Pakistan Army. Following the independence of Bangladesh, the building was expanded and renovated. Sessions of the Constituent Assembly of Bangladesh were held in this building. Thereafter, sessions of the Jatiya Sangsad were held in this building until the construction of the Jatiya Sangsad Bhaban was completed in 1982. After subsequently being used as the President's Secretariat, it was made the Prime Minister's Office in 1991. Following the July Uprising, the building was damaged by vandalism and looting on 5 August 2024, resulting in its renovation for 15 days. It was then made the Chief Adviser's Office. In 2026, the building was again allocated as the Prime Minister's Office.
