= Moinuddin Ahmed Chowdhury =

Indian politician

- Born: February 1, 1921
- Died: November 24, 1998 (aged 77)
- Family: Ghughu-danga Zamindar Bari

Moinuddin Ahmed Chowdhury (1 February 1921 – 24 December 1998) was a politician in East Pakistan, social benefactor, and member of the Ghugudanga Zamindar family.

He was a member of the East Pakistan Provincial Assembly and also became elected to the post of Parliamentary Secretary. He was also the President and sometimes an active Member of the executive committee of a number of social welfare organisations of Dinajpur.

== Ghugudanga Estate ==
During the last part of the British rule, Ghugudanga Estate was the most important amongst the Muslim Zemindars within undivided Dinajpur district comprising 30 police stations. It is known that the annual lease amount of this Estate stood to the tune of Taka one lakh that time. There were 41 Tehsils and about 80 Peyadas (Process Servers) and Barkandaz (Footmen) within Ghugudanga Estate area covering 11 Police Stations. There once stood two old office buildings (Kuthibari) in Eidgah Residential Area just to the east of Dinajpur Bara Maidan of Dinajpur Town; but the main residential building of Zeminder family was built at Ghugudanga village situated on the left bank of the river Punarbhaba which is 6 miles to the south of Dinajpur Town.

After the partition of India in 1947, most of the Ghugudanga Estate areas fell within Indian territory. Due to the promulgation of the State Acquisition Act, the financial stability of this Zemindar family started declining gradually. Consequent to the help, co-operation, and shelter afforded to the freedom-fighters by the members of Ghugudanga Zemindar families during the liberation War, raiders completely destroyed the main residential building of the Zemindar by air-raid bombing. Afterwards, most of the Ghugudanga Zemindar families started living by constructing their own houses in Eidgah Residential Area of Dinajpur Town.

== Birth, descent and pedigree ==
Moinuddin Ahmed Chowdhury was born on 1 February 1921, in the Zemindar family at Ghugudanga village of Auliapur Union No. 6 under Kotwali Police station of Dinajpur district. The name of his father is Mohiuddin Ahmed Chowdhury and that of mother is Ahimunnessa Chowdhurani. Moinuddin Ahmed Chowdhury was the eldest son of his parents. The names of the grandfather and great-grandfather of Moinuddin Ahmed Chowdhury were Hajee Jamiruddin Chowdhury and Ful Mohammad Chowdhury respectively. Nabir Mohammad, the father of Ful Mohammad Chowdhury, happened to be the first progenitor of Ghugudanga Zemindar family. He came from Jalpaiguri by river, built his house at a place named Patharghata a bit upstream from Ghugudanga, and started trading in rice and paddy. He also came to Kolkata by river and established a business centre at Chitpur. Subsequently, his son Ful Mohammad Chowdhury purchased many Zemindari's gradually and, after shifting himself from Patharghata, he built a Zemindar's Lodge at Ghugudanga for permanent habitation.

== Education ==
Moinuddin Ahmed Chowdhury passed his matriculation examination from Dinajpur Zilla School in the 1937 and acquired his B.A. degree in 1942 from Ripon College, Kolkata, Later, he acquired a master's degree in Islamic History from the University of Calcutta in 1945.

== Family ==
Moinuddin Ahmed Chowdhury's married Fatema Begum, the eldest daughter of late Md. Ishaque of Rankin Street, Kolkata in 1947. Fatema Begum happened to be a student in English medium courses. The couple had one son and two daughters. Their only son Dr. Chowdhury Mosaddequl Isdani once acted as the Chief Medical Officer of Dinajpur Regional Diabetics Hospital. Moinuddin Ahmed Chowdhury and his son Dr. Chowdhury Mosaddequl Isdani contributed to the shaping of the institution.

Among their two daughters, Raheli Zannat is the eldest. Her husband late Nurul Islam was an Engineer. The youngest daughter is Maleka Parveen. Her husband is Mr. Lutfor Rahman Mintu a noted businessman of Dinajpur, a social worker and President of District B.N.P. They both are residing at Dinajpur.

== Politics and other activities ==
At the time of British rule in colonial India, he had anti-British sentiments and affiliated himself with the Pakistan movement of the then—Muslim League. From 1949 to 1954, he served as an honorary magistrate in Magistrate's Court at Dinajpur. In 1962, he was elected as the Chairman of No. 6 Auliapur Union Council his own area. Between 1962 and 1970, he was a Member of the East Pakistan Provincial Assembly. He also held the situations of Parliamentary Secretary of the Ministry of Commerce, Industries and Home Affairs. The then government of Pakistan awarded him with the Tamgha-e-Pakistan (T-Pk), the fourth-highest civil decoration.

Consequent to the starting of widespread carnage on the night of 25 March 1971 by Pakistani raiders, he helped in setting up of a camp for the freedom fighters at Ghugudanga Zemindar's Lodge and, arranged for their food and shelter. The Pakistani army completely destroyed the Ghugudanga Zemindar's Lodge. During the liberation war, Moinuddin Ahmed Chowdhury along with the members of his family stayed at Cheragipara village of West Dinajpur (now South Dinajpur) of West Bengal, India. At that time he presided over an assemblage of Bangladeshis living abroad at a place named Mohipal Dighi under Kusumundi Police Station of the then West Dinajpur, India. In that gathering, Prof Yusuf Ali – who later became the Education Minister of Bangladesh – read out the proclamation document for independent Bangladesh.

In 1977–78 he was elected as a Member of Development Board, Rajshahi Division.

He was Founder-President of National Heart Foundation (Dinajpur Branch), Dinajpur Adarsha College, Homoeopathic Medical College, Collegiate High School, F.P.A.B. Dinajpur, Ghugudanga Palli Mangal Samitee and Probeen Hitaishi Sangha Dinajpur. He was the vice-president of Diabetics Association (Dinajpur Branch) and was also involved with a number of other social and welfare organisations.

== Death ==
Moinuddin Ahmed Chowdhury died on 24 December 1998, at his residence in Eidgah Residential Area. He was laid to rest at the family graveyard adjacent to Ghugudanga Zeminder's Lodge.

A resolution was taken in the thirteenth sitting of the Bangladesh National Assembly in its opening session on 6 June 1999, mourning the former Member's demise.
