= Masihul Azam Khan =

Bangladeshi politician

Mashiul Azam Khan was a politician from what was then East Pakistan and member of the East Pakistan Provincial Assembly during the 1965–69 term.

== Political career ==
Khan served as a member of the East Pakistan Provincial Assembly from the Muslim League.
