= Ghulam Faruque Khan =

Pakistani politician (1899-1992)

Ghulam Faruque Khan HPk, CIE, OBE
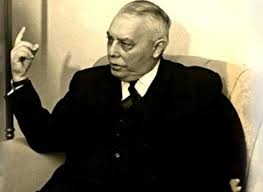

6th Governor of East Pakistan
- In office 11 May 1962 – 25 October 1962
- President: Ayub Khan
- Preceded by: Muhammad Azam Khan
- Succeeded by: Abdul Monem Khan

Personal details
- Born: 7 October 1899 Shaidu, North West Frontier Province, British India
- Died: 29 April 1992 (aged 92) Peshawar, North-West Frontier, Pakistan
- Citizenship: British Raj (1899–1947); Pakistan (1947–1992)
- Education: Aligarh Muslim University
- Awards: Hilal-e-Pakistan (Crescent of Pakistan) award by the Government of Pakistan (1958)

Ghulam Faruque Khan HPk, CIE, OBE (7 October 1899 – 29 April 1992) was a Pakistani politician and businessman who was the founder of Ghulam Faruque Group.

As a politician, he became Governor of East Pakistan and Federal Minister for Commerce, Science and Technology where he served from 1964 to 1967. He was also member of the National Assembly of Pakistan from 1973 to 1977 and member of the Senate of Pakistan from 1985 to 1991 and again from 1991 until his death.

He was also the founder of Pakistani conglomerate Ghulam Faruque Group.

== Early life and education ==
Ghulam Faruque Khan was born on 7 October 1899, in Shaidu, Nowshera District of North West Frontier Province, British India. He was the son of Khan Mir Aslam Khan Khattak (1841–1922), a landlord, social worker, civil contractor and Muslim leader of Nagpur who donated huge amount of money to Muslims education and always stood for the rights of Muslims. Mir Aslam Khan was a Pashtun of the Akor Khel Khattak tribe and was born in the house of Nawab Khan Khattak. His father was Rasual Khan Khattak of Shaidu Khan Khel, which is a village in Nowshera tehsil, Peshawar District of British India (now in Nowshera District of Khyber-Pakhtunkhwa, in Pakistan). Shaidu is home to the Akor Khel, ruling khel of the Khattak tribe, as well as to the Mohallah Khan Khel (Khel stands for a family or descendants) clan who came here when two sons of Khushal Khan Khattak, named Shahbaz Khan Khattak and Abdul Qadir Khan Khattak, came from Akora Khattak to Shaidu. The two larger groups of Khan Khel descend from the brothers. The Akor Khels, a clan named after Akoray, still hold a prominent position in the Khattak tribe.

He received his education from Aligarh Mohamedan Anglo Oriental College, now called Aligarh Muslim University.

== Career ==
Faruque began his career with the Bengal–Nagpur Railway in 1921, eventually serving as General Manager of the East Indian Railway Company (1946–1948).

After the partition of India, he served as chairman of the Pakistan Jute and Cotton Board (1949–1952), chairman of the Pakistan Industrial Development Corporation (1952–1958), and chairman of the Pakistan Ordnance Factory. Faruque was involved in the establishment of the Water and Power Development Authority (WAPDA) and became the chairman of East Pakistan WAPDA in 1958. He contributed to the negotiations of the Indus Water Treaty between India and Pakistan in 1960.

Faruque was appointed Governor of East Pakistan in 1962. Later that year, he resigned due to political unrest on 28 October 1962. He also held several other governmental roles, including Federal Minister for Commerce, Defence Advisor (1965–1967), chairman of the Investment Corporation of Pakistan, Secretary of the Ministry of Industry, and Minister for Finance, Planning and Development of the North West Frontier Province.

He was undefeated in every election in which he was a candidate over his entire political career. He defeated Arbab Noor Muhammad Khan in his hometown, Peshawar NW.2, in 1970. He was reelected from NW.2 in 1972.

== Death ==
Ghulam Faruque Khan died on 29 April 1992.

=== Ghulam Faruque Group ===
In 1947, Faruque founded the Ghulam Faruque Group. It consists of the following companies:

- Cherat Cement Company
- Cherat Papersack
- Cherat Packaging Company (founded in 1992)
- Mirpurkhas Sugar Mills (formerly owned by Pakistan Industrial Development Corporation (P.I.D.C.). Taken over by the Ghulam Faruque Group in the 1960s)
- Zensoft
- Greaves Pakistan
- Unicol
- Unienergy

== Awards and honors ==
He received several honors, including:

- Officer of the Order of the British Empire (1944)
- Companion of the Order of the Indian Empire (1946)
- Commander of the Order of Merit of Spain (1956)
- Hilal-e-Pakistan (Crescent of Pakistan) award by the Government of Pakistan (1958).

Political offices
Preceded by Lt Gen Azam Khan	Governor of East Pakistan; 1962	Succeeded by Abdul Monem Khan
