= Abdul Monem Khan =

Pakistani politician

- আবদুল মোনেম খান عبدالمنیم خان
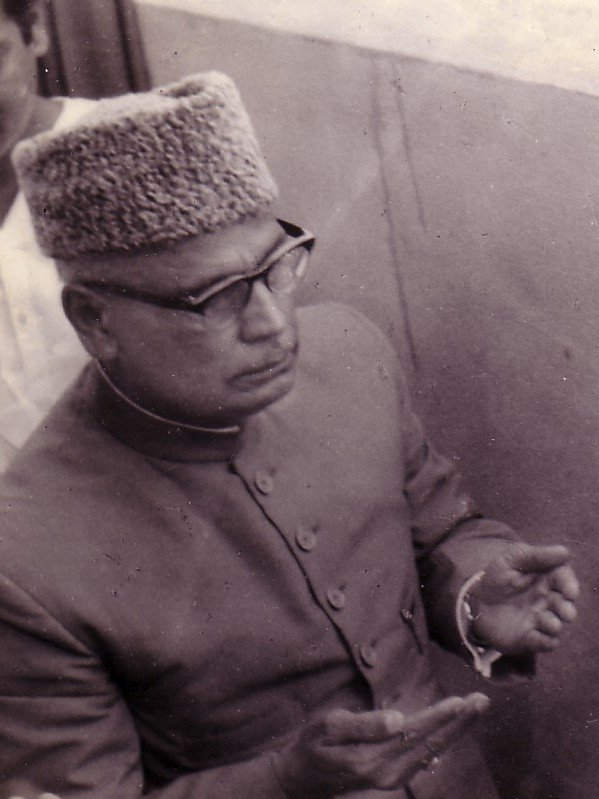
- Khan at the foundation of Jhenaidah Cadet College (1963)

7th Governor of East Pakistan
- In office 28 October 1962 – 23 March 1969
- Preceded by: Ghulam Faruque Khan
- Succeeded by: Mirza Nurul Huda

Personal details
- Born: 28 July 1899 Bajitpur, Bengal, British India
- Died: 14 October 1971 (aged 72) Dacca, Bangladesh
- Cause of death: Assassination by gunshot
- Resting place: Banani Graveyard, Dhaka, Bangladesh
- Citizenship: Pakistani
- Party: Muslim League; Pakistan Muslim League
- Education: Dhaka College; University of Calcutta; University of Dhaka
- Occupation: Politician

Abdul Monem Khan (28 July 1899 – 14 October 1971) was a Bengali politician of East Pakistan who was the longest-serving governor of East Pakistan from 1962 until 1969. He was assassinated in 1971 during the Bangladesh Liberation War.

== Early life and education ==
Khan was born in Humayunpur village of Bajitpur Upazila, Kishoreganj to Kamar Ali Khan and Nasima Khatun. He studied in Mymensingh Zilla School graduating in 1916. He went on to Dhaka College and earned his bachelor of law degree from University of Calcutta in 1922. He got another law degree from the University of Dhaka in 1924.

== Career ==
In 1927, Khan joined the Mymensingh District Bar. He was part of the Muhammadan Sporting Club of Mymensingh. In 1930, he worked with Subhas Chandra Bose to carry out aid operations after a flood in North Bengal. In 1932, he became the assistant secretary of the Mymensingh Anjuman-i-Islamia. He became the founding secretary of Mymensingh branch of the All India Muslim League in 1935.

In 1941, Khan was expelled from the Mymensingh district Muslim League due to cooperating with A. K. Fazlul Huq when Huq formed a coalition government with the Hindu Mahasabha, but the ban was lifted a few months later and Khan rejoined the Muslim League after Khan regretted his conduct. Khan would then be appointed Assistant Secretary of the Mymensingh district Muslim League. From 1946 to 1954, he served as the chairman of the Mymensingh District School Board. In 1946, Abdul Monem Khan organized the Muslim National Guard in Mymensingh with 100,000 volunteers and became the Salar-i-Zilla or the commander-in-chief of the district. He was elected a member of the East Pakistan Muslim League Working Committee in 1947. He also became a Counselor at the All Pakistan Muslim League. He was elected to the Constituent Assembly of Pakistan and East Bengal Primary Education Board in 1948. He was appointed to the Bengal Defence Committee and the Provincial Armed Services Board in 1950.

Khan lost in the 1954 East Bengali legislative election. In 1962, he was elected uncontested a member of the National Assembly of Pakistan. He joined the cabinet led by President Ayub Khan becoming the Minister for Health, Labour and Social Welfare. During his ministry, seven medical colleges were established in East Pakistan and MBBS condensed course for the LMF doctors was introduced and the Institute of Postgraduate Medicine and Research (now Bangladesh Medical University) was established. After two months, on 28 October 1962, he was appointed as the governor of East Pakistan.

=== Governor of East Pakistan ===
Khan rendered services during the tidal wave of Chittagong in 1963 and again during the aftermath of the cyclone of 1965. He helped in the establishment of Jahangirnagar University. In July 1967, he converted Dighapatia Palace into Dighapatia Governor's House.

While the governor of East Pakistan, Khan remained loyal to the Ayub regime, making him unpopular to the people of East Pakistan. Under the pressure of the 1969 mass student uprising, he was removed and replaced by Mirza Nurul Huda as the new governor on 24 March 1969.

== Death ==
In the Bangladesh Liberation War, Khan supported the Pakistan army. On 13 October 1971, he was shot at his Banani residence by a Mukti Bahini member named Mozammel Hoque, and died at Dhaka Medical College Hospital the following day, aged 72. Hoque later earned Bir Protik title for this act.

== Legacy ==
In 1964, the Government of East Pakistan allotted a 5.11-acre land for Khan's family at Banani near Banani Graveyard. In November 2016, Dhaka North City Corporation demolished structures on a land in Banani occupied, as per the order of the then mayor Annisul Huq, for over five decades by the family of Khan.

In July 2016, during a raid by Dhaka Metropolitan Police in the Kalyanpur area of Dhaka, nine suspected militants were killed. Among them, Aqifuzzaman Khan, was identified as the grandson of Monem Khan.

In January 2017, the Mymensingh District administration shut down a school, run by Nasreen Monem Khan, a daughter of Monem Khan. It was established at his house at Notun Bazar Saheb Ali Road in Mymensingh town in 1996.

In July 2017, Khan's nameplate was removed from Uttara Ganabhaban.
