= 1962 East Pakistan Provincial Assembly election =

- 1962

150 of the 155 seats in the Provincial Assembly

Provincial Assembly elections were held in East Pakistan in May 1962 as part of the wider provincial elections.

== Background ==
The East Pakistan Provincial Assembly had been suspended in 1958 after President Iskandar Ali Mirza introduced martial law. A new constitution was adopted in 1962, which provided for an indirectly elected 155-seat Provincial Assembly, of which 150 seats were elected from single-member constituencies by electoral colleges under the "basic democracy" system, and five seats were reserved for women, who were elected by the 150 elected members divided into five constituencies. In East Pakistan there were 40,000 members of the electoral college. Elections were to be held on a non-partisan basis.

== Aftermath ==
Elections to the National Assembly were held at the same time and the newly elected National Assembly convened for its first meeting on 8 June. Martial law was ended, and political parties were allowed to reform after the passing of the Political Parties Bill on 17 July. In East Pakistan this included the Awami League of Sheikh Mujibur Rahman and the National Awami Party of Abdul Hamid Khan Bhashani.
