= Provincial Assembly of East Pakistan =

Provincial Assembly of Pakistan

East Pakistan Provincial Assembly পূর্ব পাকিস্তান প্রাদেশিক পরিষদ
- 4th Provincial Assembly of East Pakistan

Type
- Type: Unicameral

History
- Founded: 20 June 1947; 79 years ago
- Disbanded: 16 December 1971; 54 years ago
- Preceded by: Bengal Legislative Assembly
- Succeeded by: Constituent Assembly of Bangladesh

Structure
- Seats: 155
- Political groups: Government (81): Convention Muslim League (81); Opposition (23): All-Pakistan Awami League (12); National Awami Party (Wali) (3); Council Muslim League (3); National Democratic Front (2); National Awami Party (Bhasani) (1); Jamaat-e-Islami Pakistan (1); Nizam-e-Islam Party (1); Others (51): Other parties and independents (51)

Elections
- Voting system: 150 seats directly elected via First-past-the-post; 5 seats reserved for women elected via proportional representation
- First election: 8–12 March 1954
- Last election: 17 December 1970

Meeting place
- Jagannath Hall, Dacca (1948–1962); Assembly House, Dacca (1963–1969)

The East Pakistan Provincial Assembly, known as the East Bengal Legislative Assembly between 1947 and 1955, was the provincial legislature of East Pakistan between 1947 and 1971. It was known as the East Bengal Assembly from 1947 to 1955 when the provincial name was changed. The legislature was a successor to the Bengal Legislative Assembly, which were divided between East Bengal and West Bengal during the partition of Bengal in 1947. It was the largest provincial legislature in Pakistan. Elections were held only twice in 1954 and 1970.

During the Bangladesh War of Independence in 1971, most Bengali members elected to the Pakistani National Assembly and the East Pakistani provincial assembly became members of the Constituent Assembly of Bangladesh.

== History ==
=== Partition of Bengal ===
On 20 June 1947, 141 East Bengali legislators from the Bengal Legislative Assembly voted on the partition of Bengal, with 107 supporting joining Pakistan's Constituent Assembly if Bengal were partitioned. The Sylhet region in Assam voted in a referendum to join Pakistan. After the creation of the Dominion of Pakistan, those 141 legislators, in addition to legislators from Sylhet of the Assam Legislative Assembly, formed the East Bengal Legislative Assembly. The Muslim League's Sir Khawaja Nazimuddin became the first chief minister. He was succeeded by Nurul Amin in 1948. The assembly was housed in Jagannath Hall, within the vicinity of the University of Dacca and the High Court of Dacca. The area was the center of the Bengali language movement in 1952. All 34 Hindu legislators fled away following the 1950 East Pakistan riots, prominent among them being Jogendranath Mandal.

=== Land reform ===
The assembly passed the East Bengal State Acquisition and Tenancy Act of 1950. The act repealed the earlier laws and regulations which formed the permanent settlement during British rule.

=== United Front comes to power ===
The United Front coalition, led by the Krishak Praja Party and the Awami League, routed the Muslim League during the provincial general election in 1954. The Farmer and Labour Party leader A. K. Fazlul Huq became chief minister for six weeks. The United Front called for complete autonomy in East Bengal, except in defence and foreign policy; and the recognition of Bengali as a federal language. The East Bengal Legislative Assembly passed a law for the establishment of the Bengali Academy. However, Huq's government was dismissed within two months, following deadly clashes between Bengali speaking Bengali Muslims & Urdu-speaking Bihari Muslim labourers at the Adamjee Jute Mills, with the government being accused of mismanagement. Huq was placed under house arrest. After a period of Governor General's rule, Abu Hussain Sarkar became chief minister in 1955.

=== One Unit and 1956 Constitution ===
As a result of the One Unit scheme, the assembly was renamed as the East Pakistan Provincial Assembly in 1955. Pakistan became a republic under the Constitution of Pakistan of 1956, in which Bengali was recognized as a federal language as a concession to East Pakistan.

In 1957, the East Pakistan Provincial Assembly adopted a unanimous resolution demanding full autonomy. Ataur Rahman Khan became chief minister in 1956.

=== Martial law ===
In 1958, a brawl broke out between political factions in the assembly, resulting in the deputy speaker Shahed Ali Patwary being injured. Patwary later died. The confrontation was used as a pretext by President Iskander Mirza to declare martial law on 7 October 1958. The chief of army staff Ayub Khan was appointed Chief Martial Law Administrator. Khan later assumed the presidency by replacing Mirza. All provincial assemblies, including in East Pakistan, were disbanded. Numerous political leaders and journalists were arrested. The Elected Bodies Disqualification Order barred 75 politicians from holding public office for eight years (until 1966).

=== 1962 Constitution ===
The Constitution of Pakistan of 1962 abolished the parliamentary system and introduced a presidential and gubernatorial system at the federal and provincial levels respectively. The most important feature of the system was dubbed "Basic Democracy", in which electoral colleges would be responsible for electing the President of Pakistan and Governors of East and West Pakistan.

In 1962, Dacca was declared Pakistan's legislative capital. During the 1960s, the East Pakistan Provincial Assembly was housed in Parliament House in Tejgaon. The National Assembly of Pakistan would periodically convene in the same building. The building is now the Prime Minister's Office of Bangladesh.

In 1966, the six points of the Awami League demanded a federal parliamentary democracy.

=== Return of martial law ===
In 1969, President Ayub Khan was deposed by the army chief Yahya Khan. The 1969 uprising in East Pakistan played a role in the overthrow of President Ayub Khan. The new ruler Yahya Khan organized general elections in 1970 based on universal suffrage (the first in Pakistan's history), in which the Awami League won 288 of the 300 seats in East Pakistan's provincial assembly. The refusal of the Pakistani military junta to transfer power led to the Bangladesh Liberation War in 1971.

=== Bangladeshi Constituent Assembly ===
Following the Pakistani military crackdown in East Pakistan that began on 25 March 1971, most members of the East Pakistan Provincial Assembly and the Bengali members of the National Assembly of Pakistan convened in Boiddonathtala, Meherpur on 17 April 1971, where they signed the Proclamation of Bangladesh Independence that was declared on 26 March and rebroadcast on 27 March.

== Elections ==
=== East Bengal legislative election, 1954 ===
The 1954 election in East Bengal was the first election since Pakistan was created. It was held on the basis of separate electorates, with reserved seats including 228 for the Muslim electorate, 30 for the Hindu electorate, 36 for the scheduled caste electorate, 1 for the Pakistan Christian electorate, 12 for the women's electorate and 1 for the Buddhist electorate.

Awami League	Krishak Sramik Party	Nizam-e-Islam	Gonotantri Party	Khilafat-e-Rabbani	Muslim League	Pakistan National Congress	Minority United Front	Scheduled Caste Federation	Communist Party of Pakistan	Christian	Buddhist	Independent Caste (Hindu)	Independents
143	48	19	13	1	10	24	10	27	4	2	1	1	3

The Awami League emerged as the single largest party. However, in response to popular demands, the United Front Legislative Party elected Krishak Sramik Party leader A K Fazlul Huq, a former Prime Minister of Bengal, as Leader of the House. Huq was invited by the governor on 3 April 1954 to form the government. The election ended the dominance of the Muslim League in the politics of East Bengal. It heralded a younger generation of legislators from the vernacular middle class. But verdict had little impact on Pakistan's central leadership and bureaucracy.

=== East Pakistan general election, 1970 ===
The 1970 general election broke with the tradition of separate electorates and was organized on the basis of universal adult franchise. The results are given in the following,

Awami League	Pakistan Democratic Party	National Awami Party	Jamaat-e-Islami	Others	Independents
288	2	1	1	1	7

The newly elected assembly could not convene due to the Pakistani military crackdown in East Pakistan. During the Bangladesh War of Independence, the Proclamation of Bangladeshi Independence was signed by most of its members, which transformed the assembly into a part of the Constituent Assembly of Bangladesh, alongside Bengali members of the National Assembly of Pakistan.

== Members ==
1. List of members of the 1st Provincial Assembly of East Pakistan
2. List of members of the 2nd Provincial Assembly of East Pakistan
3. List of members of the 3rd Provincial Assembly of East Pakistan
4. List of members of the 4th Provincial Assembly of East Pakistan

== Chief ministers ==
Political Party

Muslim League
Krishak Sramik Party
United Front
Awami League

#	Portrait	Name	Term of office			Political Party	Governor	Governor-General/ President
#	Portrait	Name	Term start	Term end	Time in office	Political Party	Governor	Governor-General/ President
1		Sir Khawaja Nazimuddin (1894 – 1964)	August 15, 1947	September 4, 1948	1 year, 20 days	Muslim League	Sir Frederick Chalmers Bourne	Muhammad Ali Jinnah
2		Nurul Amin (1893 – 1974)	September 14, 1948	April 3, 1954	5 years, 201 days	Muslim League	Sir Feroz Khan Noon	Sir Khawaja Nazimuddin Malik Ghulam Muhammad
3		Sher-e-Bangla; A. K. Fazlul Huq (1873 - 1962)	April 3, 1954	May 29, 1954	56 days	United Front	Chaudhry Khaliquzzaman	Malik Ghulam Muhammad
[-]		Vacant (Governor's rule)	May 29, 1954	June 20, 1955	1 year, 22 days	N/A	-	Malik Ghulam Muhammad
4		Abu Hussain Sarkar (1894 - 1969)	June 20, 1955	August 30, 1956	1 year, 71 days	Krishak Sramik Party	Iskander Mirza Sir Thomas Hobart Ellis (Acting) Muhammad Shahabuddin (Acting)	Malik Ghulam Muhammad Iskander Mirza
5		Ataur Rahman Khan (1907 - 1991)	September 1, 1956	March 31, 1958	1 year, 211 days	Awami League	Amiruddin Ahmad (Acting) Sher-e-Bangla; A. K. Fazlul Huq	Iskander Mirza
(4)		Abu Hussain Sarkar (1894 - 1969)	March 31, 1958	April 1, 1958	1 day	Krishak Sramik Party	Sher-e-Bangla; A. K. Fazlul Huq Muhammad Hamid Ali (Acting)	Iskander Mirza
(5)		Ataur Rahman Khan (1907 - 1991)	April 1, 1958	June 18, 1958	78 days	Awami League	Muhammad Hamid Ali (Acting) Sultanuddin Ahmad	Iskander Mirza Ayub Khan
(4)		Abu Hussain Sarkar (1894 - 1969)	June 18, 1958	June 22, 1958	4 days	Krishak Sramik Party	Sultanuddin Ahmad	Ayub Khan
[-]		Vacant (Governor's rule)	June 22, 1958	August 25, 1958	64 days	N/A	-	Ayub Khan
(5)		Ataur Rahman Khan (1907 - 1991)	August 25, 1958	October 7, 1958	43 days	Awami League	Sultanuddin Ahmad	Ayub Khan

== See also ==
- Parliament of Bangladesh
