= Presidency of Ayub Khan =

Pakistan's second president's tenure

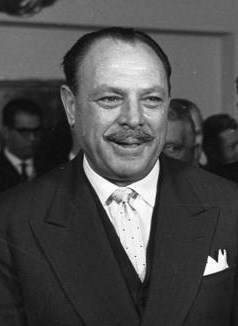
- Presidency of Ayub Khan; 27 October 1958 – 25 March 1969
- Party: Convention Muslim League
- Election: 1960, 1965
- Seat: Prince Palace, Rawalpindi
- Presidential Standard of Pakistan

Ayub Khan's tenure as the second president of Pakistan began on 27 October 1958 when he overthrew President Iskander Mirza in a coup d'état, and ended in 1969 when he resigned amid mass protests and strikes across the country.

During his presidency, he implemented economic policies such as price controls and land reforms, while increasing military compensation to keep it loyal to his administration. In foreign policy, he strengthened diplomatic ties with China and the United States. His administration celebrated 28 October, the coup anniversary, as Revolution Day.

== Cabinets ==
Ayub Khan's first cabinet was inaugurated within hours of the 1958 coup that toppled President Iskander Mirza and imposed martial law. Second presidential cabinet took oath on 17 February 1960 after Ayub Khan was confirmed as the president in the presidential confidence referendum. The cabinet operated under the Presidential (Election & Constitution) Order 1960 and its mandate was to supervise the constitution-making process, lift martial law and normalise politics through the basic democracies system. Once the 1962 Constitution was promulgated and martial law formally ended on 8 June 1962, a new presidential cabinet was inaugurated. Several reshuffles in 1962-63 created specialist divisions (Scientific & Tech Research, Natural Resources) as the government tried to project a developmentalist image. The cabinet stood down after Ayub's victory over Fatima Jinnah in the indirect presidential election of January 1965 and another presidential cabinet was inaugurated. The last cabinet was dissolved Ayub resigned on 25 March 1969 amid strikes and the East Pakistan uprising.

=== Presidential cabinet (28 October 1958 – 17 February 1960) ===
==== President ====
Office-holder	Portfolio(s)	Period
General Mohammad Ayub Khan (N.Pk., H.Pk., H.J.)	Cabinet Division	28 Oct 1958 – 17 Feb 1960
General Mohammad Ayub Khan (N.Pk., H.Pk., H.J.)	Defence	28 Oct 1958 – 17 Feb 1960
General Mohammad Ayub Khan (N.Pk., H.Pk., H.J.)	Kashmir Affairs	28 Oct 1958 – 17 Feb 1960
General Mohammad Ayub Khan (N.Pk., H.Pk., H.J.)	Establishment Division	28 Oct 1958 – 23 Apr 1959

==== Ministers ====
Minister	Portfolio(s)	Period
Azam Khan	1. Rehabilitation; 2. Food & Agriculture; 3. Works, Irrigation & Power	28 Oct 1958 – 17 Feb 1960; 16 Jan 1960 – 17 Feb 1960; 16 Jan 1960 – 17 Feb 1960
Wajid Ali Khan Burki	Health & Social Welfare	28 Oct 1958 – 17 Feb 1960
Manzur Qadir	Foreign Affairs & Commonwealth Relations	29 Oct 1958 – 17 Feb 1960
Muhammad Ibrahim	Law	28 Oct 1958 – 17 Feb 1960
K. M. Sheikh	1. Interior (Home Affairs Division); 2. States & Frontier Regions; 3. Establishment Division	28 Oct 1958 – 17 Feb 1960; 18 Nov 1958 – 17 Feb 1960; 23 Apr 1959 – 17 Feb 1960
Muhammad Shoaib	Finance	15 Nov 1958 – 17 Feb 1960
Abdul Kasem Khan	Industries	28 Oct 1958 – 17 Feb 1960
Khan F. M. Khan	Railways & Communications	28 Oct 1958 – 16 Jan 1960
Habibur Rahman	1. Education; 2. Information & Broadcasting	29 Oct 1958 – 17 Feb 1960
Zulfikar Ali Bhutto	1. Minority Affairs; 2. Commerce; 3. Information & Broadcasting	29 Oct 1958 – 17 Feb 1960; 29 Oct 1958 – 16 Jan 1960; 11 Nov 1958 – 16 Jan 1960
Md. Hafizur Rahman	1. Minority Affairs; 2. Commerce; 3. Food & Agriculture	28 Oct 1958 – 16 Jan 1960; 28 Oct 1958 – 17 Feb 1960; 16 Jan 1960 – 17 Feb 1960

=== Presidential cabinet (17 February 1960 – 8 June 1962) ===
==== President ====
Office-holder	Portfolio(s)	Period
Field Marshal Mohammad Ayub Khan, H.Pk., H.J.	Defence	17 Feb 1960 – 8 Feb 1962
Field Marshal Mohammad Ayub Khan, H.Pk., H.J.	Kashmir Affairs	17 Feb 1960 – 23 Apr 1960
Field Marshal Mohammad Ayub Khan, H.Pk., H.J.	President's Secretariat — Cabinet, Establishment, SAFR, Economic Affairs	17 Feb 1960 – 8 Jun 1962
Field Marshal Mohammad Ayub Khan, H.Pk., H.J.	States & Frontier Regions (separate division)	23 Apr 1960 – 8 Jun 1962
Field Marshal Mohammad Ayub Khan, H.Pk., H.J.	National Reconstruction & Information	5 Aug 1961 – 8 Jun 1962
Field Marshal Mohammad Ayub Khan, H.Pk., H.J.	Planning Division	3 Feb 1962 – 8 Jun 1962

==== Ministers ====
Minister	Portfolio(s)	Period
Azam Khan	1. Rehabilitation; 2. Food & Agriculture; 3. Works and Water Resources	17 Feb 1960 – 15 Apr 1960
Manzur Qadir	1. Foreign Affairs & Commonwealth Relations; 2. Law	17 Feb 1960 – 8 Jun 1962; 15 Apr 1962 – 22 May 1962
Wajid Ali Khan Burki	1. Health, Labour & Social Welfare; 2. Education & Scientific Research; 3. Kashmir Affairs; 4. Minority Affairs	17 Feb 1960 – 8 Jun 1962; 2 Mar 1962 – 8 Jun 1962; 2 Mar 1962 – 3 Mar 1962; 2 Mar 1962 – 8 Jun 1962
Muhammad Ibrahim	Law	17 Feb 1960 – 15 Apr 1962
K. M. Sheikh	1. Home Affairs; 2. Rehabilitation & Works; 3. Food & Agriculture; 4. Fuel, Power & Natural Resources; 5. States & Frontier Regions; 6. Establishment Division	17 Feb 1960 – 14 Jun 1960; 23 Apr 1960 – 7 Sep 1961; 15 Apr 1960 – 8 Jun 1962; 23 Apr 1960 – 8 Jun 1962; 17 Feb 1960 – 5 Aug 1961; 17 Feb 1960 – 23 Apr 1960
Muhammad Shoaib	1. Finance; 2. Economic Coordination	17 Feb 1960 – 30 Jan 1962; 30 Jan 1962 – 6 May 1962
Abul Kashem Khan	Industries	17 Feb 1960 – 8 Jun 1962
Khan F. M. Khan	Railways & Communications (renamed Communications 14 May 1962)	17 Feb 1960 – 8 Jun 1962
Habibur Rahman	1. Education (renamed Education & Scientific Research 24 Feb 1961); 2. Minority Affairs; 3. National Reconstruction & Information	17 Feb 1960 – 17 Apr 1961; 23 Apr 1960 – 29 Jun 1960; 17 Apr 1961 – 8 Jun 1962
Zulfikar Ali Bhutto	1. Information & Broadcasting (renamed National Reconstruction & Info. 10 Mar 1960); 2. Minority Affairs; 3. Fuel, Power & Natural Resources; 4. Kashmir Affairs (first term); 5. National Reconstruction & Information (second term); 6. Works; 7. Kashmir Affairs (second term)	17 Feb 1960 – 1 Jun 1960; 17 Feb 1960 – 23 Apr 1960; 23 Apr 1960 – 8 Jun 1962; 23 Apr 1960 – 1 Jun 1960; 25 Nov 1960 – 10 Apr 1961; 7 Sep 1961 – 8 Jun 1962; 3 Mar 1962 – 8 Jun 1962
Md. Hafizur Rahman	Commerce	17 Feb 1960 – 28 May 1962
Akhter Husain	1. National Reconstruction & Information; 2. Kashmir Affairs; 3. Minority Affairs; 4. Education & Scientific Research	1 Jun 1960 – 28 Oct 1960; 10 Apr 1961 – 17 Apr 1961; 1 Jun 1960 – 1 Mar 1962; 29 Jun 1960 – 1 Mar 1962
Zakir Husain	Interior (renamed Home Affairs 24 Feb 1961)	14 Jun 1960 – 8 Jun 1962
Abdul Qadir	1. Finance; 2. Commerce	30 Jan 1962 – 8 Jun 1962; 28 May 1962 – 8 Jun 1962
Muhammad Munir	1. Law; 2. Parliamentary Affairs	22 May 1962 – 8 Jun 1962

=== Presidential cabinet (8 June 1962 – 23 March 1965) ===
==== President ====
Office-holder	Portfolio(s)	Period
Field Marshal Mohammad Ayub Khan (N.Pk., H.J.)	President's Secretariat – Cabinet Division	8 Jun 1962 – 23 Mar 1965
Field Marshal Mohammad Ayub Khan (N.Pk., H.J.)	Establishment Division	8 Jun 1962 – 23 Mar 1965
Field Marshal Mohammad Ayub Khan (N.Pk., H.J.)	States & Frontier Regions Division	8 Jun 1962 – 23 Mar 1965
Field Marshal Mohammad Ayub Khan (N.Pk., H.J.)	Economic Affairs Division	8 Jun 1962 – 23 Mar 1965
Field Marshal Mohammad Ayub Khan (N.Pk., H.J.)	Planning Division	8 Jun 1962 – 23 Mar 1965
Field Marshal Mohammad Ayub Khan (N.Pk., H.J.)	Scientific & Technological Research Division	6 Oct 1964 – 23 Mar 1965
Field Marshal Mohammad Ayub Khan (N.Pk., H.J.)	Defence	8 Jun 1962 – 23 Mar 1965
Field Marshal Mohammad Ayub Khan (N.Pk., H.J.)	Information & Broadcasting	30 Apr 1963 – 4 Sep 1963

==== Ministers ====
Minister	Portfolio(s)	Period
Muhammad Munir	1. Law; 2. Parliamentary Affairs	8 Jun 1962 – 17 Dec 1962
Mohammad Ali	External Affairs	13 Jun 1962 – 23 Jan 1963
Abdul Qadir	Finance	8 Jun 1962 – 15 Dec 1962
Abdul Monem Khan	1. Health; 2. Labour & Social Welfare	13 Jun 1962 – 7 Nov 1962
Habibullah	1. Home Affairs; 2. Kashmir Affairs	13 Jun 1962 – 23 Mar 1965
Wahiduzzaman	Commerce	13 Jun 1962 – 20 Mar 1965
	Health	7 Nov 1962 – 17 Dec 1962 and 28 Oct 1963 – 20 Jan 1964
	Labour & Social Welfare	7 Nov 1962 – 17 Dec 1962 and 28 Oct 1963 – 20 Jan 1964
Zulfikar Ali Bhutto	1. Industries (13 Jun 1962 – 4 Sep 1963); 2. Natural Resources (13 Jun 1962 – 4 Sep 1963); 3. Rehabilitation & Works (31 Aug 1962 – 3 Feb 1963); 4. External Affairs / Foreign Affairs (24 Jan 1963 – 23 Mar 1965; renamed 30 Jan 1964)	13 Jun 1962 – 23 Mar 1965
Abdus Sabur Khan	Communications	13 Jun 1962 – 23 Mar 1965
A. K. M. Fazlul Qader Chowdhury	1. Food & Agriculture (13 Jun 1962 – 4 Sep 1963); 2. Rehabilitation & Works (13 Jun 1962 – 31 Aug 1962); 3. Education (17 Aug 1962 – 4 Sep 1963); 4. Information & Broadcasting (17 Aug 1962 – 30 Apr 1963); 5. Labour & Social Welfare (3 Feb 1963 – 28 Oct 1963); 6. Health (4 Sep 1963 – 28 Oct 1963)	13 Jun 1962 – 28 Oct 1963
Shaikh Khursheed Ahmad	1. Law; 2. Parliamentary Affairs	17 Dec 1962 – 23 Mar 1965
Rana Abdul Hamid	1. Health (17 Dec 1962 – 4 Sep 1963); 2. Labour & Social Welfare (17 Dec 1962 – 3 Feb 1963); 3. Rehabilitation & Works (3 Feb 1963 – 23 Mar 1965); 4. Food & Agriculture (4 Sep 1963 – 23 Mar 1965)	17 Dec 1962 – 23 Mar 1965
Muhammad Shoaib	Finance	15 Dec 1962 – 23 Mar 1965
A. T. M. Mustafa	1. Education; 2. Information & Broadcasting	4 Sep 1963 – 23 Mar 1965; 4 Sep 1963 – 9 Jan 1964
Abdullah al-Mahmood	1. Industries; 2. Natural Resources	4 Sep 1963 – 20 Mar 1965
Abdul Waheed Khan	Information & Broadcasting	9 Jan 1964 – 23 Mar 1965
Abd-Allah Zaheer-ud-Deen (Lal Mia)	1. Health; 2. Labour & Social Welfare	20 Jan 1964 – 22 Mar 1965

=== Presidential cabinet (23 March 1965 – 25 March 1969) ===
==== President ====
Office-holder	Portfolio(s)	Period
Field Marshal Mohammad Ayub Khan (N.Pk., H.J.)	Cabinet Division	23 Mar 1965 – 25 Mar 1969
Field Marshal Mohammad Ayub Khan (N.Pk., H.J.)	Establishment Division	23 Mar 1965 – 25 Mar 1969
Field Marshal Mohammad Ayub Khan (N.Pk., H.J.)	States & Frontier Regions Division	23 Mar 1965 – 25 Mar 1969
Field Marshal Mohammad Ayub Khan (N.Pk., H.J.)	Economic Affairs Division	23 Mar 1965 – 25 Mar 1969
Field Marshal Mohammad Ayub Khan (N.Pk., H.J.)	Planning Division	23 Mar 1965 – 25 Mar 1969
Field Marshal Mohammad Ayub Khan (N.Pk., H.J.)	Defence Division	23 Mar 1965 – 21 Oct 1965
Field Marshal Mohammad Ayub Khan (N.Pk., H.J.)	Scientific & Technological Research Division	23 Mar 1965 – 1 Jan 1965
Field Marshal Mohammad Ayub Khan (N.Pk., H.J.)	Home and Kashmir Affairs	23 Mar 1965 – 17 Aug 1965

==== Ministers ====
Minister	Portfolio(s)	Period
Khwaja Shahabuddin	Information & Broadcasting	24 Mar 1965 – 25 Mar 1969
Muhammad Shoaib	Finance	24 Mar 1965 – 25 Aug 1966
Abdus Sabur Khan	Communications	24 Mar 1965 – 25 Mar 1969
Zulfikar Ali Bhutto	Foreign Affairs	24 Mar 1965 – 31 Aug 1966
Ghulam Faruque	1. Commerce (29 Mar 1965 – 15 Jul 1967); 2. Scientific & Technological Research (1 Jan 1966 – 15 Jul 1967)	29 Mar 1965 – 15 Jul 1967
Altaf Hussain	1. Industries; 2. Natural Resources	29 Mar 1965 – 15 May 1968
Syed Muhammad Zafar	1. Law; 2. Parliamentary Affairs	29 Mar 1965 – 25 Mar 1969
Kazi Anwarul Huque	1. Education; 2. Health, Labour & Social Welfare	29 Mar 1965 – 25 Mar 1969
Chaudhry Ali Akbar Khan	1. Home Affairs; 2. Kashmir Affairs	17 Aug 1965 – 30 Nov 1966
A. H. M. S. Doha	1. Food & Agriculture; 2. Rehabilitation & Works	17 Aug 1965 – 25 Mar 1969
Syed Sharifuddin Pirzada	Foreign Affairs	20 Jul 1966 – 1 May 1968
N. M. Uquaili	1. Without portfolio (25 Jul 1966 – 25 Aug 1966); 2. Finance (25 Aug 1966 – 25 Mar 1969)	25 Jul 1966 – 25 Mar 1969
Afzal Rahman Khan	1. Defence (21 Oct 1966 – 25 Mar 1969); 2. Home Affairs Division (5 Dec 1966 – 25 Mar 1969); 3. Kashmir Affairs Division (5 Dec 1966 – 25 Mar 1969)	21 Oct 1966 – 25 Mar 1969
Nawabzada Abdul Ghafur Khan Hoti	1. Without portfolio (5 Jul 1967 – 15 Jul 1967); 2. Commerce (15 Jul 1967 – 25 Mar 1969)	5 Jul 1967 – 25 Mar 1969
M. Arshad Hussain	Foreign Affairs	7 May 1968 – 25 Mar 1969
Ajmal Ali Choudhury	1. Without portfolio (6 Jul 1968 – 18 Jul 1968); 2. Industries Division (18 Jul 1967 – 25 Mar 1969); 3. Natural Resources Division (18 Jul 1967 – 25 Mar 1969)	6 Jul 1968 – 25 Mar 1969

== Policies ==
=== Education ===
To counter the opposition, his administration had replaced the elected governing boards of universities with government appointees throughout the country.

=== Press ===
During his presidency, the press had limited freedom and often faced economic sanctions and restrictions. Newspaper editors and journalists were frequently imprisoned without trial for failing to follow government protocols.

== Opposition ==
Ayub Khan's presidency faced opposition from leaders such as Asghar Khan, Zulfikar Ali Bhutto, and Sheikh Mujibur Rahman. Bhutto resigned as foreign minister from Ayub's cabinet and emerged as a central figure in the opposition. His political activities led to a government crackdown and his arrest. After Bhutto's detention, Asghar Khan, former commander of the Pakistan Air Force under Ayub rule, became a major opposition leader. His entry into politics led to criticism of his military record and later when he tried to lead processions, police in East Pakistan brought summons against him for violating the law.
