= Azam Khan (general) =

Pakistani general and Governor (1908–1994)

Lieutenant General Azam Khan HQA
- اعظم خان
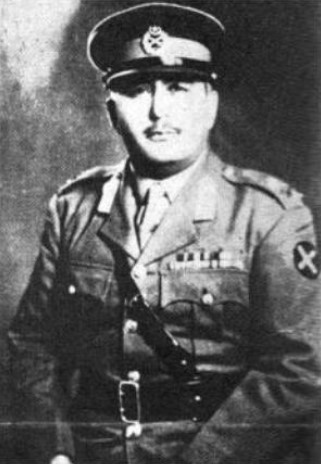
- Official military portrait, 1958

4th Governor of East Pakistan
- In office 15 April 1960 – 10 May 1962
- President: Field Marshal Ayub Khan
- Preceded by: Zakir Husain
- Succeeded by: Ghulam Faruque Khan

Minister of Rehabilitation, Food & Agriculture, and Works, Housing & Water Resources (Note: Redesignated as the Ministry of Works and Water Resources, effective 16 February 1960.)
- In office 28 October 1958 – 14 April 1960
- President: Ayub Khan

7th President Pakistan Olympic Association
- In office 16 November 1958 – 22 September 1963
- Preceded by: Feroz Khan Noon

Commander I Corps
- In office July 1957 – 27 October 1958
- Succeeded by: Bakhtiar Rana

Martial Law Administrator of Lahore
- In office 6 March 1953 – 14 May 1953
- Deputy: Chief Secretary Hafiz Abdul Majid

Personal details
- Born: Mohammad Azam Khan; 1 July 1908 Mathra, North-West Frontier Province, British India
- Died: September 1994 (aged 86) Lahore, Pakistan
- Children: 2
- Education: Prince of Wales Royal Indian Military College; Royal Military College, Sandhurst; Staff College, Quetta

Military service
- Branch/service: British Indian Army (1929-1947); Pakistan Army (1947-1960)
- Years of service: 1929–1960
- Rank: Lieutenant General
- Unit: Rifle Brigade (1929-1930); 19th Hyderabad Regiment (1930-1941); 10th Baluch Regiment (1942-1946); Kumaon Regiment (1946)
- Commands: I Corps (Pakistan)
- Battles/wars: World War II; Arakan campaign (1942–1943); Malayan campaign; Indo-Pakistani war of 1947–1948; Lahore riots of 1953
- Service number: AI–948 (1929-1947); PA-16 (1950)

Mohammad Azam Khan (Note: Urdu: محمد اعظم خان; Sometimes spelled as Muhammad Azam Khan or Mohammed Azam Khan.) (1 July 1908 — September 1994) popularly known as The People's Governor, Azam Bandhoo, (Note: Roughly translates to 'Azam Friend' from Bangla, he was affectionately referred to as such by East Pakistanis for his service as Governor.) and Azam Chacha, (Note: Chacha translates to uncle in Bangla and Urdu.) was an athlete, Pakistani general and politician. He held several ministerial positions in the first cabinet of President Ayub Khan between 1958 and 1960 and served as the fourth Governor of East Pakistan from 1960 to 1962. He was also the seventh President of the Pakistan Olympic Association from 1958 to 1963.

Born in the North-Western Frontier, Khan was awarded a scholarship to the Royal Military College, Sandhurst in 1927, where he gained repute as a first class boxer, footballer, and captained both teams. He was commissioned into the British Indian Army in 1929 and transferred to an infantry regiment in 1930. In World War II, he served as a staff officer of a combined operation in the Arakan.

After the Partition of 1947, he opted for the Pakistan Army and later became second-in-command of 25 Infantry Brigade. He was promoted to Brigadier and given command of the brigade on New Year's Eve 1947. In the First Kashmir War, he led the brigade under the pseudonym of "General Beg". By late 1949, he was promoted to Major General and assumed command of the 10th Division in Lahore.

In early March 1953, the failure of the Government of Punjab to contain the Lahore riots led to Defence Secretary Iskandar Ali Mirza ordering General Azam to impose martial law in the city. Over a nine-week period, the military restored law and order. Other major efforts included improvement in sanitation, crackdowns on hoarding and black markets, and enforcement of traffic regulations. After martial law was lifted in mid-May 1953, Dawn remarked that these actions significantly enhanced the military's reputation among the public. By 1954, Khan was promoted to Lieutenant General and three years later, he became the first Commander of I Corps.

Subsequent to the 1958 military coup d'état which brought General Ayub Khan to power, Azam Khan emerged as one of the most prominent figures in the new administration. As Minister of Rehabilitation for Refugees of the 1947 Partition, he downsized the bloated and ineffective bureaucracy of the ministry. Hundreds of thousands of refugees, who had been displaced since Partition, were living for over a decade in severely overcrowded and unsanitary conditions without access to clean drinking water.

Under his leadership, major projects such as the Korangi Township near Karachi were completed in record time, providing proper housing and improved living conditions. His energy, authoritarian efficiency, and emphasis on visible results earned him a reputation as one of the most dynamic ministers in President Ayub Khan's government.

Appointed Governor of East Pakistan in 1960, Azam Khan rose to become an unexpectedly popular and sympathetic administrator in a province long resentful of neglect from the federal government. He abandoned his protocol (Note: In Pakistani common usage, protocol usually refers to VIP security arrangements, police escorts and convoys, official motorcades, and road blockages or special treatment for the elite.) and became known for associating with ordinary people, particularly the poor. He championed economic development, disaster relief, and infrastructure projects such as the Kaptai Dam, a major U.S.-funded project previously plagued by mismanagement and corruption. The dam's completion was regarded as the first major success of American aid in the region and reinforced his reputation as an effective administrator.

He openly addressed local concerns and challenged dismissive attitudes from the central government, while his hands-on approach, especially after cyclones and floods, won him public affection. That popularity, however, alarmed President Ayub Khan and Azam was removed in 1962. During his farewell tour, massive crowds gathered to oppose his ouster. This decision was later widely regarded as a serious political miscalculation and ultimately led to the secession of East Pakistan nearly a decade later.

Azam Khan remained a political figure even after his resignation. The Combined Opposition Parties considered nominating him as a consensus candidate in the 1965 presidential election against President Ayub Khan, but Maulana Bhashani added a condition barring anyone who was associated with the 1958 martial law administration. Multiple sources indicate that Ayub's Foreign Minister Zulfikar Ali Bhutto had sabotaged Azam Khan's nomination by providing a bribe to Bhashani through an intermediary to ensure that Fatima Jinnah, the "weaker" candidate, would become the nominee instead, thereby making it easier for Ayub's re-election. Despite her eventual defeat, Azam was credited for her electoral success in East Pakistan and continued to speak out against the regime of Ayub Khan.

In 1965, The Telegraph reported that the United States' Central Intelligence Agency (CIA) attempted to recruit Azam Khan as a potential coup-maker against President Ayub, however he reportedly "refused to play ball" and informed his former boss. In the 1970s when Zulfikar Ali Bhutto became Prime Minister, he asked Azam Khan to serve as Pakistan's ambassador to Bangladesh, but he declined and said that he could not in good conscience represent either country.

Throughout the 1980s, he often criticised General Zia-ul-Haq who had came to power through a coup d'état, and on one occasion confronted him directly. Around the same time, Khan decided to gift his property to the people of Bangladesh (erstwhile East Pakistan) as a gesture of gratitude for the affection he had received during his governorship.

== Early life ==
Muhammad Azam Khan was born on 1 July 1908 in the village of Mathra into a Pashtun family.

His father, Khan Bahadur Risaldar Major Muhammad Akram, was a soldier who served in the 9th Hodson's Horse and fought in World War I, as part of the British Indian Army. He served alongside and was a close friend of Risaldar Major Mir Dad Khan, the father of Ayub Khan. Just as the two fathers became close friends, their sons, Azam and Ayub, would also become friends.

Azam Khan completed his early education at the Prince of Wales Royal Indian Military College. On 12 November 1927, Iftikhar Khan and Azam Khan were the two Muslim cadets selected to attend the Royal Military College, Sandhurst which began on 2 February 1928. Days later on 17 November, both were awarded the Pratap Singh Memorial Scholarship, worth £100 (equivalent to £5,432 in 2025) each. At the college, Azam Khan was regarded as an "all-round sportsman", gaining repute as a first class boxer and footballer, and captained both teams.

== Military career ==
=== British Indian Army and World War II ===
Second Lieutenant Azam Khan joined the British Indian Army on the unattached list as a King's Commissioned Indian Officer on 29 August 1929, and later joined the 2nd battalion of the Rifle Brigade (Prince Consort's Own) on 13 October 1929.

On 1 November 1930, Khan was attached to the 4th Battalion of the 19th Hyderabad Regiment which had other notable officers including S. M. Shrinagesh, KS Thimayya, and Kanwar Bahadur Singh. The battalion arrived at Sandeman Fort in Quetta on 5 October 1931, having moved from Allahabad. Khan's service following the 1934 earthquake in Quetta was noted as "outstanding". Advancing in his career, he was appointed Quartermaster of the battalion on 11 May 1936 and was promoted to the rank of Captain on 29 August 1938. He was posted as its Adjutant on 6 December 1939, while they were stationed at Tyersall Park in Singapore.

During World War II, Azam Khan served in Malaya and on the Burma front, where a bomb detonated near him severely impairing his hearing in one ear. He also served as a staff officer of a combined operation in the Arakan, where he fought against the Japanese for a year. He later trained troops at Versova and Madh Island.

From 21 July to 13 December 1941, Captain Azam Khan attended the 4th War Course at Staff College, Quetta. According to the April 1943 Indian Army List, (Note: The Families in British India Society Wiki states that the list is incorrectly catalogued as 1943-October.) he was serving as a Staff Captain with the Upper Sind Forces. On 20 June, he was assigned as General Staff Officer Grade 1 at the Directorate of Military Intelligence (India) and promoted to the rank of temporary Lieutenant Colonel on 15 September 1943. While attached to the 19th Hyderabad Regt in 1944, he was with the 10th Baluch Regiment.

In May 1945, Lieutenant Colonel Azam Khan succeeded Lieutenant Colonel Allen Oswald Charles Pettyfer as commander 9th Battalion, 10th Baluch Regiment. He held this command until 25 April 1946 as the next day, the battalion was reconstituted as 2/10th Baluch. By October 1946, Khan was serving with the Kumaon Regiment and assigned to a military selection board responsible for evaluating officers for appointments in the three branches of the armed forces of British India.

Sometime that year, Captain (later Colonel, retired) Amjad Sayed went to a party attended mostly by English officers, with a few locals present where Azam Khan was the chief guest and during the gathering, a remark made by Khan upset Sayed. Khan said, "Mr Jinnah is a mad man. He wants to divide India and divide this beautiful Indian army. How is that possible?" Sayed retorted, "Sir, you have no right to speak like this about Mr Jinnah who is a great leader of the Muslims. We have great respect for him. I have great respect for Mahatma Gandhi, too, but Mr Jinnah is our leader. He will get Pakistan and you, too, would benefit from it." The officers present began to clap at Sayed's reply.

=== Pakistan Army ===
After the Partition of British India in August 1947, Lt Col Azam Khan opted for the Pakistan Army and was appointed Assistant Quartermaster General. Subsequently, he became second-in-command of the 25th Infantry Brigade, serving under Brigadier Maurice Vernon Wright. On 31 December 1947, his promotion to the rank of Brigadier was announced and he assumed command of the brigade, succeeding Brigadier Wright.

==== War of 1947–1948 ====
During the war, he commanded the 25th Infantry Brigade and played a key role in many of the main areas of the conflict. According to ex-Major General Akbar Khan, Brigadier Azam Khan consistently sent detailed reports to headquarters at 7th Division but received little guidance or reinforcements.

Pakistani military historian retired Major Agha Humayun Amin noted that Brigadier Azam arrived at Mendhar on 7 November 1947, requesting artillery and regular forces to secure the area. Despite the dire circumstances for his troops, he was unexpectedly summoned to Hajira by Maj-Gen Tottenham to consult on future operations on Poonch, as the Indian attack on the frontlines became even heavier. Ultimately, Khan managed to convince the divisional command to send the request for additional reinforcements from Abbottabad to Mendhar.

In July 1948, as reports emerged that India was preparing to link Rajouri with Poonch, 25th Brigade was ordered to Kotli to forestall any Indian breakout from Jhangar. By the time Brigadier Azam Khan arrived, Indian forces were already advancing from Naushehra. After India failed to connect with Poonch using the Uri-Hajipir Pass, the Indian Army renewed their offensive from Rajouri in the third week of September 1948 with only minimal effective resistance ensuring the besieged town was linked. Although India's tactical results were poor, Indian troops were forced by logistical issues to leave the high ground around Pīr Kanthi before winter arrived. The 100th Brigade, commanded by Brigadier K. M. Sheikh later replaced Azam Khan, and the 17 Field Company Engineers, under Major Safdar, created hundreds of miles of motorable tracks that facilitated moving troops and supplies in and out of the area.

After the Indian link-up, Brigadier Azam Khan considered withdrawing his artillery from Hajira to Pallandri about 33 miles behind the front. This suggestion was strongly opposed by revolutionary leader Sardar Ibrahim Khan, who argued that such a withdrawal would result in surrendering a large area of land outside the boundaries of the Poonch River, despite a strong defensive position. In addition, many other officers, including Major Ghani, Major Mir Baz, and several junior officers, refused to leave their posts in the Poonch sector. Realising the seriousness of the situation, Azam Khan contacted General Headquarters for their advice. The ultimate decision was to hold the position and not withdraw the weaponry, preserving both the defensive line along with the morale of the troops and local population.

==== Commander 10 Division (1949—1957) ====
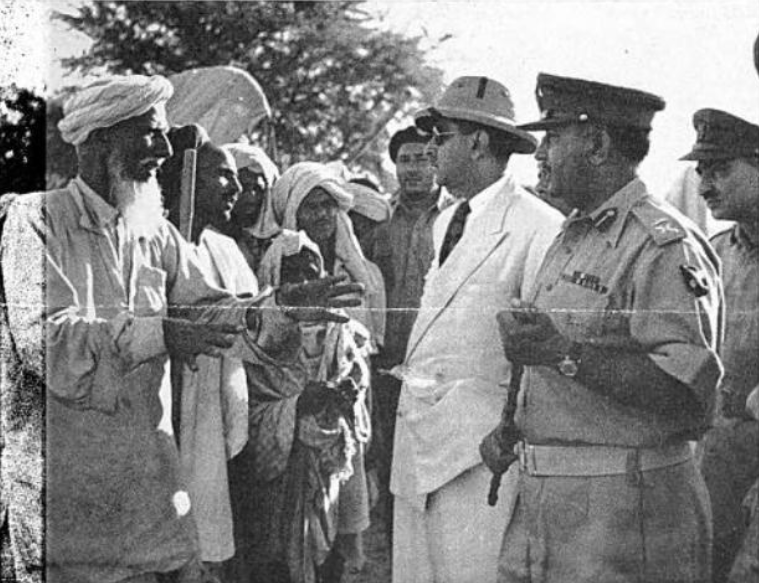
General Officer Commanding Lahore, Lieutenant General Azam Khan, listens to descriptions of the flood from residents in the areas he was surveying, 1955

On 28 December 1949, General Headquarters announced his promotion to Major General. He was appointed as General Officer Commanding of the 10th Division stationed in Lahore. In an effort to "foster a civic sense" among the public, he sponsored a Healthier Lahore Week and utilised the services of the Inter-Services Public Relations, the army's media wing, to organise a publicity campaign against "social evils" such as extravagant expenses on weddings and parties. He also endeared himself to the local population by deploying the army to assist after the 1950 floods and ordered the protection of Mughal Emperor Jahangir's tomb from encroachment by the Ravi River.

===== Martial Law Administrator of Lahore (1953) =====
In early 1953, widespread religious unrest erupted in the Punjab province, overwhelming the civilian authorities. The disturbances, primarily in Lahore, were incited by the Majlis-e-Ahrar-e-Islam, Jamaat-e-Islami Pakistan, and Jamiat Ulema-e-Pakistan, who targeted the Lahore Ahmadiyya Movement and demanded that the government declare its members non-Muslims. Prime Minister Khawaja Nazimuddin was being urged to give in to the rioters demands by Punjab's Chief Minister Mumtaz Daultana, who himself was enabling the rioters. As this was unfolding, Defence Secretary Iskander Mirza placed a call to Major General Azam Khan in Lahore and said, "Azam, it looks as though the civil authorities have lost control in Lahore. You are to take over immediately, and declare Martial Law. Don't wait for any further orders. I take all responsibility. Declare Martial Law, take action, and finish the thing off." Khan replied, "Sir, there will be casualties," to which Mirza responded, "I expect casualties or you will not be doing your duty."

On 6 March 1953 at 1:30 PM, Khan imposed Pakistan's first martial law in Lahore. Over the following nine weeks, the army took control of the city and their efforts included improvements in sanitation, action against hoarding and black marketeering, and stricter enforcement of traffic laws. Retired Air Marshal Asghar Khan in his book, Generals in Politics: Pakistan 1958-1982, said that this "gave the army its first taste of power as it discovered that it could control seemingly unruly mobs with the power of the gun". Similarly, Feisal Khan, Chair of the Economics Department at Hobart and William Smith Colleges, wrote in his 2015 book that credible reports suggest Azam Khan had independently instructed the military to prepare for intervention and was on the verge of issuing martial law orders when the central government officially directed him to act. Feisal noted that the military's rapid response indicated that contingency plans had already been developed and were promptly executed.

During the military operation, General Azam Khan began sending telegrams to Mirza and copies to the Prime Minister, stating, "X number mullahs shot today." According to Mirza, "up to now the Prime Minister was relatively calm, but upon seeing these telegrams he lost his nerve." Nazimuddin called Mirza and said, "Colonel, I cannot sleep. The Army is killing these Men of God... and I cannot sleep."

Mirza then instructed Azam to change the wording of his reports. He called him and said, "You idiot, when you have to shoot these Mullahs, why do you have to advertise that you are shooting Mullahs?" When Azam asked, "What should I call them, sir?" Mirza replied, "Say, so many bad characters shot." Mirza later wrote, "After that Azam Khan used this formula, and everyone was happy, except perhaps the mullahs. And this was how we were running the country." With law and order restored in Lahore, General Ayub Khan congratulated Azam, saying, "Damn good show".

On 13 May, Azam Khan commuted the death sentences of Abul A'la Maududi and Abdul Sattar Khan Niazi to 14 years of rigorous imprisonment—sentences that were subsequently further reduced. On 14 May, martial law was officially lifted and the army withdrew from the city. Reflecting on the military's administration, Dawn commented on 16 May: "Memories of the Army rule in Lahore will linger for a long time to come, and the new look the city has acquired and the sense of discipline among its people inculcated by the army will bear eloquent testimony to the good work done by Maj Gen Azam Khan and his men."

In an interview to Jang in October 1983, Professor Ghulam Mustafa Shah said that an industrialist from Punjab told him that when General Azam Khan imposed Martial Law in Lahore, the general reportedly advised him to send his sons to the military as civilian rule would never return to Pakistan.

==== Commander I Corps (1957-1958) ====
On 1 July 1957, I Corps was raised in Abbottabad and Lieutenant General Azam Khan was appointed as its Commander. In November 1957, the Corps shifted to Jhelum.

According to (Retd) Brigadier A.R. Siddiqui, Khan was a "forceful commander but lacked in logistical planning." He also said that Khan carried around a copy of Rommell's Papers and his "enthusiasm infected most of his subordinate commanders."

==== Federal Minister (1958-1960) ====
On the evening of 27 October 1958, General Ayub Khan carried out a coup d'état against President Iskandar Ali Mirza, subsequently assuming the presidency. Lieutenant General Azam Khan was among the officers who went to President Mirza's residence and ordered him to resign.

Azam Khan was appointed as Minister of Rehabilitation in the first cabinet of President Ayub Khan and was also designated as the Administrator of Martial Law Zone B, which included the entirety of West Pakistan excluding Karachi. He sacked the staff of the ministry which had been occupied by an "army of bureaucrats". A declassified memo sent by the High Commissioner of Canada to Pakistan to the Secretary of State for External Affairs (Canada), described him as "the most active Minister," "a forceful man of tremendous drive and outstanding determination," who had "succeeded in putting new life into the somewhat moribund refugee administration" and was regarded as someone "who will brook no obstacle in getting things done quickly."

By February 1959, he had drawn up a US$25 million housing program to resettle refugees. Approximately half a million refugees who had migrated to Pakistan following the Partition of British India had been living in some of the worst conditions in Karachi for over 11 years. They resided in mud and straw huts without access to sanitation, clean drinking water, or electricity. Under his leadership, a new residential area called Korangi Township, was constructed near Karachi in a record time of just five months, providing them with proper housing and improved living conditions. According to Dawn, Journalist Ghulam Tahir was jailed for seven years by the regime of General Ayub Khan for asking General Azam Khan a question about the settlement of refugees from India.

In early February 1959, Khan briefly served as the acting Foreign Minister of Pakistan. High Commissioner of Australia to Pakistan, Roden Cutler, presented his letter of introduction to Khan.

In a nationwide Radio Pakistan broadcast on 9 June 1959, General Azam Khan declared, "Henceforth there will be no distinction between a refugee and a local." He emphasised that all Pakistanis regardless of how they had been identified in the past, should unite in serving the country, and added that "the progress of Pakistan is the progress of the entire nation."

Khan also commended the refugees for their sacrifice and said: "Everyone knows that the refugees did not come to Pakistan for the sake of houses, shops, lands, factories or to build up their own properties." Instead, he stressed that they had "staked their all for the sake of Pakistan" and continued to remain driven by the same commitment, viewing service to the nation as "their religious duty."

On 17 September 1959, President Ayub Khan inaugurated the Mohammadpur Refugee Colony in Dacca, which was initiated by Azam Khan. President Ayub also appointed Azam as the Minister of Food and Agriculture, as well as Minister of Works, Irrigation, and Power on 16 January 1960 and held all these positions until 17 April 1960.

In early 1960, a delegation consisting of officials from the Government of India and the Government of Punjab, India arrived in Pakistan for talks at Government House, Lahore to demarcate the western boundary between the two countries. While the matter was officially under the purview of the Government of India, the Punjab government had its own concerns, primarily the canal works at Hussainiwali and Sulemanki, which Edward Nirmal Mangat Rai, who was among the officials from Punjab, described as "the most thorny."

After the talks ended, Mangat Rai wrote in his diary about the Pakistani officials he had met. He mentioned General Azam Khan as an old school friend who had risen to become the regime's second-most powerful figure, remarking that he had a friendly manner, easy confidence, and energetic optimism. But Mangat Rai also observed that Azam and the other officials shared a common trait: despite their distinct personalities, they had all become, in his words, "bores". By this he meant that officials were single-minded and eager to praise their regime, anxious to prove its achievements, and driven by a conviction that they were reshaping the future of Pakistan. To him, their uniform mindset suggested that the government thought they had produced a kind of revolution, one defined by a profound shift in attitude and emphasis rather than by upheaval.

Azam Khan was retired from the army in February 1960. In his lengthy response to President Ayub Khan's June 1962 letter, Azam wrote: "I also hope that you have not forgotten when in 1958 I was drawn into the Revolution I had to go to the extent of risking my life and sacrificing my army career for the cause of the country and the nation. Again when you deprived me of my permanent commission in the Armed Forces ordering my premature compulsory retirement in February, 1960, according to army regulations I was perfectly fit for a much longer tenure.

==== President of Pakistan Olympic Association (1958-1963) ====
He served as the President of the Pakistan Olympic Association from 16 November 1958 to 22 September 1963.

==== Governor of East Pakistan (1960–1962) ====
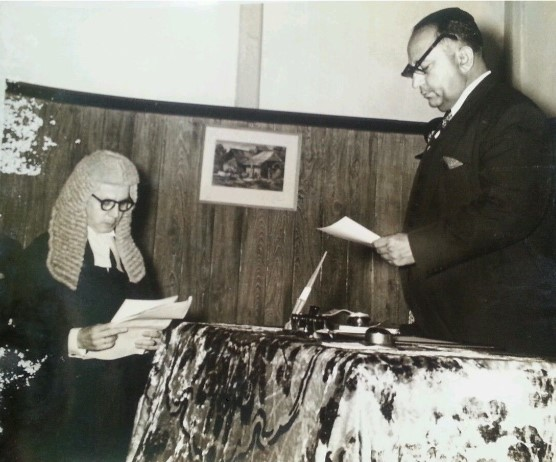
Chief Justice Mirza Ali Ispahani administers the oath of Governor to Lt General Azam Khan, 1960

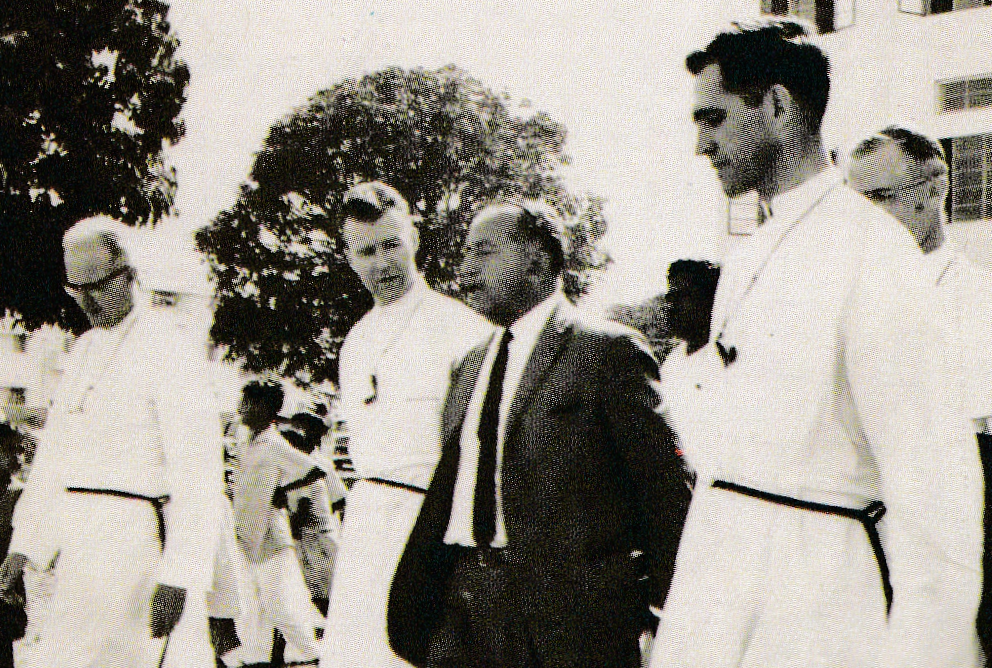
Governor Khan and Catholic Fathers attend a ceremony at Notre Dame College, Dhaka

President Ayub Khan appointed Lt. General Azam Khan as Governor of East Pakistan on 11 April 1960. A now-declassified document from the United States' Central Intelligence Agency (CIA) at the time states that this move placed Ayub's "right-hand man" in charge of the country's most populous province and signaled that the central government was making East Pakistan's development a priority. Known for his effectiveness, Azam Khan was expected to pursue rapid economic improvements.

The report claimed that his appointment might provoke resentment. As a West Pakistani replacing a local, he was seen as an outsider and an unknown figure to many in the province and that in addition to being an outsider, "Azam in his drive for greater efficiency and harder work may offend provincial sensitivities." His move from the central cabinet, which also marked the first such change since Ayub's 1958 military takeover, was noted to have been seen at the time as a demotion.

However, those concerns proved unfounded. Far from being rejected, Azam Khan went on to become the most popular governor in East Pakistan's history, earning admiration from the local population for his leadership and efforts to improve the region.

Sometime after becoming Governor, Khan appointed Dr. Mahmud Husain as the Vice Chancellor of the University of Dhaka. In October 1960, Khan gained popularity for his "efficient rehabilitation efforts" after the cyclones. In a letter published in Bangladesh, the author, Sikander Ahmed, portrayed Azam Khan as a decisive administrator. Khan was there on site before the Deputy Commissioner's arrival and was already coordinating relief efforts.

Another example where the author praised his efforts concerned the construction of a major road connecting Tejgaon Airport and Shahbagh before Queen Elizabeth II's visit. The project had been delayed as efforts to vacate the area were ceased as a result of court cases and legal challenges. After confirming that the road was part of the city's master plan, Azam Khan ordered demolition work to begin immediately. Khan instructed engineers to proceed regardless of opposition and reportedly told them to "roll over anyone who obstructed them, even if they waved a writ." The road was subsequently completed and opened to traffic within a week.

On 26 February 1961, Governor Khan stated in Chittagong that the growth and strengthening of the national press was essential to the country. Speaking at the foundation stone ceremony for the Chittagong Press Club building, he praised the work of the press, particularly the Chittagong press, and emphasised its responsibilities toward both the nation and the public. He explained that the press served a dual role, representing public opinion to guide the government while also communicating government policies to citizens. He further remarked that the press was making valuable contributions toward national progress and stability. He also donated Rs1,000 for the club's sports activities and another Rs1,000 for books and reading materials.

In May 1961, President Ayub Khan asked a group of Bengali economists including Dr. Mirza Nurul Huda and Professor Mazharul Huq, Professor Nurul Islam, Professor Rehman Sobhan, and Dr. Abdullah Faruouk to prepare a paper on the "two economies" of Pakistan, i.e., the East and West wings. Their report argued that Pakistan's development plans needed to reflect the country's peculiar geography, which made movement of people and material between the two wings costly and difficult.

In the summer of 1961, during President Ayub's visit to Dacca, Dr. Mirza Nurul Huda and Dr. Mazharul Huq met him in the presence of Governor Azam Khan. Upon seeing the Bengali economists, Ayub Khan hurled insults at them without referring to the paper and accused them of being anti-Pakistan and Indian agents. He further accused them of "subversive activities" by seeking to divide the country or join India. When allowed to respond, Dr. Huda explained that Ayub Khan had been misinformed by his advisers on their paper and then proeeded to explain the points from the paper. Ayub's attitude changed immediately and at that point Azam Khan jumped in, declaring "I know my people. My boys cannot be like this". He then asked Ayub who had misinformed him and why did he "suspect us of something like this", notably using us to identify himself with the Bengalis.

By September 1961, there were rumours that Azam Khan may be appointed to Moscow as Pakistan's ambassador to "turn a new leaf" in Pak-Soviet relations.

On hearing the news of the death of Sher-e-Bangla in April 1962, Governor Azam Khan rushed to the hospital and reportedly, "wept like a child, tears rolling down his cheeks, when he saw the leader in eternal sleep."

===== Environmental policy =====
In December 1960, British journalist David Cairns of The Spectator while discussing the deadly cyclone in East Pakistan that year, stated that: "The energy with which General Azam Khan, the Governor, has been organising relief, visiting every affected village (the remoter ones on foot), slaving passionately at his job with little sleep and astounding and exhausting his subordinates, represents a new type of government, a government that minds whether its people live or die, and how they are to live before they die."

Governor Azam Khan joined hands with American aid chief retired Air Force Colonel Charles W. Edwards to finish the much anticipated, $100,000,000 multi-purpose Kaptai Dam on the Karnafuli River in East Pakistan, which had been marred by mismanagement and corruption in U.S. aid projects. According to a report in the Chicago Daily News, the success of the river dam project under Azam Khan's administration, was characterised as the first major success of American aid in the region, earning him a reputation as a "get-things-done powerhouse."

During a session of the National Assembly in 1964, Mizanur Rahman Chowdhury stated that Azam Khan, during his tenure, had proposed a scheme to the Government of Pakistan for the construction of embankments along the coastal areas of Chittagong, Barisal, Khulna, Noakhali, Hatiya, and Sandwip; however, the proposal was never implemented.

===== Economic policy =====
A new market in Faridpur was opened by Governor Khan. After his tenure, it was renamed to Azam Khan Market and the post office was named to Azam Market Town Sub-Post Office. However, after the 1971 War, it was renamed to Titumir Bazaar, while the name of the post office remained the same. In 2016, a journalist in the Dhaka Tribune questioned the decision to leave the name of the post office in honour of a "Pakistan" Governor.

===== Austerity and social policy =====
Governor Azam Khan got rid of his protocol and his motorcade traveled alongside civilian vehicles. He also began associating with the poor, primarily with farmers and fishermen. According to Yusuf Zaman in The Friday Times, "it became a running joke that persons in these categories were the closest friends of the governor in East Pakistan".

In January 1961, the Provincial Development Advisory Council agreed that beggary should be completely stopped and measures taken for providing training and work to the beggars. Governor Azam Khan presided over the meeting, declaring that the dignity and honour of every man must be maintained. He emphasised that training institutes should be started for the beggars who are physically fit for work while those who were disabled could be put up in homes.

A committee formed in 1962 under the order of Governor Khan and headed by the Vice Chancellor of the University of Dhaka, Dr. Mahmud Hussain, suggested major changes in the original design of the Shaheed Minar, Dhaka. On Khan's orders, construction resumed in 1962 on the Minar but ended in a hurry. That year, he had also expedited the opening of the Mercantile Marine Academy in Chittagong.

===== Farewell tour =====
According to Dawn, Azam Khan's farewell tour of the province was marked by scenes of profound emotion. At Barisal and Chandpur, thousands of people—grim and gloomy—gathered to bid him farewell. As the steamer carrying him slowly moved off, "tears rolled down the cheeks of some, while some hid their faces with handkerchiefs and cried. Still others waved in silence, expressing deep sorrow at the departure of the man who had infused a new spirit and a new life in them." The silence was broken only occasionally by cries of, "Don't go, Azam! Come back, Azam!… don't leave us like orphans; we had great hope in you."

On 9 May 1962, close to 100,000 people gathered at a farewell ceremony for him at the Dacca Stadium and shouted "Azam Khan Zindabad" (lit. 'Long Live Azam Khan').

===== Reactions =====
According to the Associated Press (AP) in June 1962, an illiterate farmer standing in a rice field far from any road told an interviewer that Azam Khan quit because the government "wouldn't let him do the right thing for East Pakistan." AP also reported that other farmers liked Azam Khan too, but 'blamed their troubles on Ayub Khan.'

Various sources, such as Air Commodore Sajad Haider, American diplomat Archer Blood, and Lt. General Gul Hassan Khan, have stated that President Ayub Khan felt threatened by the growing popularity of Azam Khan. Ayub's son, Gohar Ayub, later criticised his father's decision and wrote in his 2008 book, "It was not wise to replace Lieutenant General Azam Khan as Governor of East Pakistan with Monem Khan." Although Gohar dismisses the notion that his father was motivated by personal insecurity, he attributed his fathers' decision to pressure from political leaders in East Pakistan. Replacing the widely popular Azam Khan with the unpopular Abdul Monem Khan proved to be a critical mistake—one that many observers view as a significant factor contributing to the eventual downfall of Ayub Khan's regime.

== Political career ==
=== 1965 presidential election ===
In 1964, the Combined Opposition Parties (C.O.P.) considered nominating Azam Khan to run against President Ayub Khan in the upcoming presidential election, due to Azam Khan's widespread popularity. However, Maulana Bhashani, a founding member of the Awami League, convinced the opposition to nominate Fatima Jinnah instead. Some speculate that Bhashani believed Fatima would be a weaker candidate and suggested her candidacy to ensure Ayub Khan's victory, as he was favoured by the Chinese.

Earlier, when the C.O.P. agreed to unite behind a single candidate, they required that the candidate must have unanimous support from all member parties. Bhashani reportedly added another condition: that no one associated with the Martial Law administration, would be acceptable. Several sources indicate that Ayub Khan's foreign minister, Zulfikar Ali Bhutto, orchestrated the entire strategy to block Azam Khan's candidacy. He did so through Masihur Rahman, a mutual friend of both Bhutto and Bhashani, by providing Masihur Rahman with Rs500,000 rupees to pass on to Bhashani, all in an effort to ensure Ayub's victory by having a weaker opponent, Fatima Jinnah, run against him. Days before the election, Bhashani and his group withdrew their support for Fatima. Nevertheless, Azam supported Fatima Jinnah and actively campaigned for her and was noted as having contributed to her success in East Pakistan.

The Telegraph on 13 September 1965 reported that the United States Central Intelligence Agency attempted to recruit Azam Khan as a potential coup-maker against President Ayub Khan, however he reportedly "refused to play ball" and informed his former boss.

==== Later years ====
On 18 December 1968, Azam Khan appealed to all democratic forces to combine and launch a mass movement for the achievement of a common goal to restore democracy and change for the better.

In July 1970, Awami League leader Sheikh Mujibur Rahman met with Azam Khan in Lahore and attempted to convince him to join his party but he declined the offer.

Subsequent to the July 1977 Pakistani military coup by General Zia-ul-Haq which led to the ouster of Prime Minister Zulfikar Ali Bhutto, Azam Khan was expected to run as an independent candidate for a National Assembly seat from Lahore against Bhutto. However, Khan called for the postponement of the elections which were scheduled for 18 October. At a press conference on 24 September 1977, Khan said: "In the prevailing climate of fear, bitterness, hatred, and tension, it is necessary to allow a reasonable period of tranquility, even at the cost of amending the time schedule for the elections, in the larger interests of the country and the development of true democracy."

Reports also indicated that Khan would run for a National Assembly seat from the Korangi area in Karachi. Speaking at a press conference at the Karachi Press Club on 29 September, he again called for postponing elections and warned of the danger of an "imminent civil war" in Pakistan. He also said that the process of accountability for political leaders should be completed "without further loss of time." In this regard, he expressed support for trials by military courts or special tribunals. Khan told newsmen that the country's two major political parties were "working up people" toward civil war and added that, "they should start thinking in terms of national interest instead of party interests." General Zia-ul-Haq later went on to cancel the elections twice, first in 1977 and again in 1979.

== Later life ==
At the Fortress Stadium in Lahore, the first National Horse and Cattle Show was held in 1964 with Azam Khan as its director, assisted by Dr SM Sarwar of the animal husbandry department.

In a session of the East Pakistan Assembly in 1967, parliamentarian Abdul Malek Ukil lamented that a "strong man" like Azam Khan was no longer the Governor of East Pakistan.

In early November 1983, the "All Pakistan Citizens Congress" was formed with Azam Khan as its first president.

In the late 1980s, the Bangladeshi ambassador to Pakistan was invited to Azam Khan's home in Lahore for tea after receiving a cryptic message from the former general. Before Khan's arrival, his wife asked the ambassador if he knew what Khan had planned to discuss with him. She then informed him that Khan had drawn up documents to gift their estates to the people of Bangladesh. She felt that the ambassador should know that they were the family's main source of income. When Azam Khan later arrived, he explained that he had received much love and affection from the people of erstwhile East Pakistan during his tenure as Governor. Wishing to show his appreciation, he decided to gift his lands to them. The ambassador thanked him but declined the offer.

=== Opposition to General Zia's regime (1980s) ===
Sometime during the reign of President General Zia-ul-Haq in the 1980s, General Zia walked up to a group of senior retired generals at an army reunion, one of them was General Azam Khan. According to retired Major General Askari Raza Malik: "In his pretended humility, Zia said he would love to benefit from the seniors' wisdom. If so, Gen Azam said, "Just leave and go home." Who to hand over? Zia asked sheepishly. "The first dog that you came across" was the curt answer. Nothing happened to Gen Azam. It was not the fashion in those days."

On 3 August 1987, Azam Khan addressed the press and urged General Zia-ul-Haq to resign as President and Chief of Army Staff as he had "failed in both capacities". In 1988, Khan accused General Zia of harbouring political ambitions from the beginning and "transforming the Army into a political party for realizing his own ends". He further said that those responsible for the Ojhri Camp disaster: "cannot find refuge anywhere in the world. And the speed with which all evidence has been concealed shows how the President was desperate to hush up the matter."

== Personal life and death ==
Azam Khan had four brothers, Muhammad Alam Khan, Major Sardar Alam Khan an officer in the Pakistan Army, poet-politician Muhammad Hasham Babar Khan, and younger brother Major Fakhr-e-Alam Khan also a Pakistani army officer who was killed in action in the Indo-Pakistani War of 1965.

Azam Khan had a pink-coloured birthmark on his forehead and as a result was nicknamed 'Pandit' by his colleagues in the British Indian Army. The birthmark was noted as being similar to the birthmark of Mikhail Gorbachev.

He married Qudsiya and they had two children, a daughter and son Shahzad Khan.

He died in September 1994 at the age of 86 in Lahore.

== Dates of rank ==
Rank	Date
Lieutenant General	May 1954
Major General	28 December 1949 (Note: Promotion was announced on this day.)
Brigadier	31 December 1947
Colonel	20 December 1946 (Ag.)
Lieutenant Colonel	20 June 1943 (Ag.); 15 September 1943 (temporary)
Major	29 August 1946 (war substantive)
Captain	29 August 1938
Lieutenant	29 November 1931
Second Lieutenant	29 August 1929

== Notes ==
Political offices
Preceded by Zakir Husain (governor)	Governor of East Pakistan; 1960–1962	Succeeded by Ghulam Faruque Khan
