= Revolution Day (Pakistan) =

Former Pakistani state holiday commemorating Ayub Khan's 1958 takeover

Revolution Day یومِ انقلاب
- Observed by: Pakistan
- Type: Historical
- Significance: Commemorates what the Ayub Khan government called the October Revolution of 1958
- Celebrations: Presidential address, flag hoisting, thanksgiving prayers, youth rallies, march-pasts, symposia, mushairas, documentary film shows and illuminations
- Date: 27 October
- Frequency: Annual

Revolution Day (Urdu: یومِ انقلاب) was an annual state observance and public holiday in Pakistan during the presidency of Ayub Khan. It was marked on 27 October to commemorate what the government described as the October Revolution of 1958, through which Ayub Khan assumed full control of the state after the removal of President Iskander Ali Mirza.

== Background ==
On 7 October 1958, President Iskander Ali Mirza abrogated the 1956 Constitution, dismissed the central and provincial governments, imposed martial law, and appointed Ayub Khan as chief martial law administrator. Twenty days later, on 27 October, Ayub forced Mirza from office and became president himself. Under the new regime, these events were officially presented as a national revolution that had rescued Pakistan from parliamentary instability and political intrigue.

On the first anniversary of Ayub Khan's takeover, the regime tied the occasion to its programme of controlled political reform. The Basic Democracies system was introduced under the Basic Democracies Order was gazetted on 27 October 1959.

== Observance ==
Revolution Day was observed throughout Pakistan with a mixture of official ceremony and public spectacle.

Ayub Khan regularly used the occasion for major political messages. In 1964, as Pakistan approached the presidential election, he used his Revolution Day broadcast to present the contest as a choice between stability and a return to political disorder. In 1965, shortly after the Indo-Pakistani war of 1965, the seventh anniversary was marked by prayers for the armed forces, a special Radio Pakistan programme and school displays in Karachi. Because of the wartime emergency, government offices and business houses remained open that year instead of observing a full closure. In 1966, Ayub described the revolution as a "fresh beginning" and divided his rule into phases, linking the early years to social and economic reform and the later phase to the institutions created under the 1962 Constitution.

The tenth year of the government was projected as the "Decade of Development" at a time of mounting opposition.

== See also ==
- 1958 Pakistani coup d'état
