= New Karachi Town =

Area in Karachi, Pakistan

New Karachi Town نیو کراچی ٹاؤن
- Constituent Town of Karachi
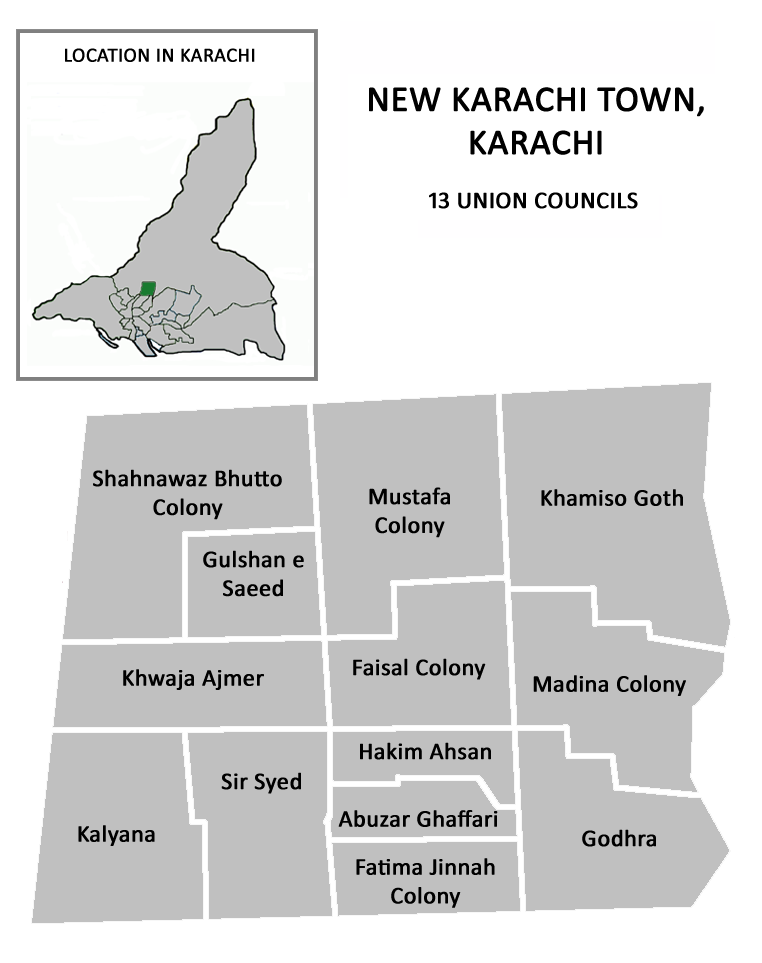
- New Karachi Town map
- Country: Pakistan
- Province: Sindh
- District: Nazimabad District
- Division: Karachi Division
- Established: 1972; 54 years ago
- Town status: 14 August 2001; 25 years ago
- Disbanded: 11 July 2011; 15 years ago
- Reorganized: March 2015; 11 years ago
- Union Committees in Town Municipal Corporation: 13: Shahnawaz Bhutto Colony Gulshan-e-Saeed Khawaja Ajmeer Nagri Mustafa Colony Moon City phase 2 society KalaSchool Khameso Goth Madina Colony Faisal Abuzar Ghaffari Godhran Hakeem Ahsan Kalyana Muhammad Shah

Government
  - Type: Government of Karachi
  - Town Chairman: Muhammad Yousuf
  - Constituency: NA-247 Karachi Central-I

Area
  - Total: 18 km^{2} (6.9 sq mi)
- Elevation: 54 m (177 ft)
- Highest elevation: 113 m (371 ft)
- Lowest elevation: 32 m (105 ft)

Population (2023 Pakistani census)
  - Total: 1,165,742
  - Density: 64,763.44/km^{2} (167,736.5/sq mi)
- Demonym: Karachiite
- Time zone: UTC+05:00 (PKT)
  - Summer (DST): DST is not observed
- ZIP Code: 75850
- NWD (area) code: 021
- ISO 3166 code: PK-SD

New Karachi Town or North Karachi Town (Urdu: نیو کراچی ٹاؤن) lies in the northern-eastern part of Nazimabad District, Sindh province of Pakistan.

It was formed when katchi abadis were resettled following the 1958 coup d'état. Town system was established by City District Government Karachi in 2001. New Karachi Town was re-organized as part of Karachi Central District in 2015. New Karachi Town has a population 1,165,742 as of 2023 Pakistani census.

== Town Municipal Committee ==
As per the Sindh Local Government Act, 2021, Sindh government replaced the previous seven District Municipal Corporations (DMCs) with 26 towns, each with its own municipal committee. Karachi Central District has five towns.

- New Karachi Town
- North Nazimabad Town
- Gulberg Town
- Liaquatabad Town
- Nazimabad Town

== History ==
After the 1958 Pakistani coup d'état, the military decided to forcibly resettle the katchi abadis of Karachi into freshly created townships such as New Karachi. The federal government under the ruling period of Pervez Musharraf, who seized power in a 1999 coup d'etat, introduced local government reforms in the year 2000, which eliminated the previous "third tier of government" (administrative divisions) and replaced it with the fourth tier (districts). The effect in Karachi was the dissolution of the former Karachi Division in 2001, and the merging of its five districts to form a new Karachi City-District with eighteen autonomous constituent towns including New Karachi Town. In 2011, the system was disbanded but remained in place for bureaucratic administration until 2015, when the Karachi Metropolitan Corporation system was re-introduced. In 2015, New Karachi Town was re-organized as part of Karachi Central district.

== Demographics ==
Languages of New Karachi sub-division (2023 Pakistani census)
1. Urdu (84.4%)
2. Saraiki (3.88%)
3. Punjabi (2.63%)
4. Sindhi (2.24%)
5. Pashto (2.01%)
6. Hindko (0.63%)
7. Balochi (0.50%)
8. Others (3.64%)

There are in total 1,165,742 people in New Karachi sub-division of which 984,105 spoke Urdu, 45,343 Saraiki, 30,667 Punjabi, 26,148 Sindhi, 23,441 Pashto, 7,360 Hindko 5,919 Balochi and 42,759 others.

== Town Municipal Corporation ==
13 Union Committees of New Karachi in Town Municipal Corporation

Sub Sr Number	Councils Falling in District (Nazimabad)	Number of Union Committee	Name of UC in Town Municipal Corporation
1	TMC New Karachi	UC#01	Shahnawaz Bhutto Colony
2		UC#02	Gulshan-e-Saeed
3		UC#03	Khawaja Ajmeer Nagri
4		UC#04	Kala School
5		UC#05	Mustafa Colony5j
6		UC#06	Khamiso Goth
7		UC#07	Madina Colony
8		UC#08	Faisal
9		UC#09	Abuzar Ghaffari
10		UC#10	Godhra
11		UC#11	Hakeem Ahsan
12		UC#12	Kalyana
13		UC#13	Muhammad Shah

== Location ==
North Karachi is located between the Lyari River, the Manghopir Hills and two major roads - Surjani Road to the north and Shahrah-e-Zahid Hussain to the south. To the north and west lies Gadap Town, and to the south lie the towns of Gulberg and North Nazimabad.

== Neighbourhoods ==
Fatima Jinnah Colony, is named after Fatima Jinnah, the sister of the founder of Pakistan, Muhammad Ali Jinnah. The neighbourhood of Hakim Ahsan is named after the mayor of Karachi who met Muhammad Ali Jinnah at Karachi Airport in 1947. Shah Nawaz Bhutto Colony is named after the father of the former Prime Minister of Pakistan Zulfikar Ali Bhutto and grandfather of the later Prime Minister Benazir Bhutto. Shah Nawaz Bhutto was the last Prime Minister of the princely state of Junagadh and was instrumental in the accession of the state to Pakistan in 1947. Sir Syed Colony is named after Sir Syed Ahmad Khan who promoted education amongst the Muslims of British India and founded the Aligarh Muslim University in 1875.

- Abu Zar Ghaffari
- Faisal Colony
- Fatima Jinnah Colony
- Godhra
- Gulshan-e-Bahar
- Gulshan-e-Farooq
- Gulshan-e-Saeed
- Hakim Ahsan
- Khamiso Goth
- Khawaja Ajmeer Nagri
- New Karachi 5 Number
- Madina Colony
- Muslim Town
- Shah Nawaz Bhutto Colony
- Zarina Colony

== Constituensy ==
NA-247 Karachi Central-I

== Parks ==
- Arif Hussain (Shaheed) Model Park (11-B, North Karachi)
- Nasir Hussain (Shaheed) Model Park (11-G, North Karachi)
- Muhammad Shareef (Shaheed) Park (5/E, New Karachi)
- Nazir Hussain (Late) Model Park (11-B, North Karachi)
- Abu Nasar Park (Late) Model Park (Kalyana Town, North Karachi)
- Rashid Minhas Family Park (5.c./1, North Karachi) (formerly known as Afza Altaf family park)
- Bi Ammaan Park (11.C, North Karachi, near Nagan Interchange)

== Major streets ==
- Shahrah-e-Khursheed Begum (Nagan Roundabout to Surjani Roundabout)
- 7000 Road (Godhra Camp to Allah Wali Roundabout Chowrangi)
- 9000 Road (Gabol Town to Saba Roundabout)
- 5200 Road (Sindh Government Hospital to Kala School)
- 5200 Road (Bashir Chowk to Sindhi Hotel)

== Police stations ==
- Industrial Area Police Station
- Khawaja Ajmeer Nagri Police Station
- New Karachi Police Station
- Bilal Colony Police Station
