= Export Bonus Scheme =

Pakistani financial policy

The Export Bonus Scheme (EBS) was a dual exchange rate system implemented by the government of Ayub Khan from 1959 to 1972. It was introduced to address foreign exchange shortages and support industrialization. In practice, it amounted to an effective devaluation of the Pakistani rupee for selected sectors. Although the EBS increased manufactured exports, it was later criticized for creating inefficiencies, distorting resource allocation, and widening regional income disparities between West Pakistan and East Pakistan (now Bangladesh).

== Background ==
After independence in 1947, Pakistan inherited a trade system that had an overvalued exchange rate and strict import controls. Despite inflationary pressures and a foreign exchange crisis in 1958, government chose not to devalue the currency to its estimated equilibrium level. Instead, the EBS was introduced in early 1959 to influence resource allocation while limiting the price effects of an outright devaluation on essential consumer goods.

== Mechanism ==
The EBS created a tiered exchange rate structure through bonus vouchers. Exporters of specified goods received the official exchange rate (US$1 = PKR 4.76) plus bonus vouchers equal to 10% to 40% of their foreign exchange earnings. These vouchers were transferable and traded on a secondary market at a premium. To import, importers had to surrender vouchers equal to the transaction value. A later "cash-cum-bonus" category required importers to purchase foreign exchange at the official rate and obtain vouchers for half of the transaction value. The system effectively subsidized exporters of manufactured goods through voucher sales and raised the effective exchange rate for importers of non-essential goods.

== Economic impact ==
The scheme was associated with rapid growth in exports of manufactured and semi-processed goods, which increased by more than 18% annually during the period. This expansion occurred alongside weaker incentives for primary commodities, which faced less favorable effective exchange rates. The implied taxation reduced incentives for agricultural production and shifted resources toward industry.

The EBS also had adverse longer-term effects on the jute sector, concentrated in East Pakistan. Less favorable treatment for raw jute kept foreign-currency prices relatively high, contributing to the expansion of jute production and processing elsewhere and reinforcing the shift toward synthetic substitutes. The system also encouraged imports of capital goods, which could be purchased at the official exchange rate. This supported capital-intensive industrialization that was less suited to a labor-abundant economy and had limited effects on unemployment. Cheaper imported machinery also reduced incentives to develop a domestic capital goods industry.

== Criticism and malpractice ==
Retrospective assessments argue that, despite supporting industrial expansion, the EBS produced structural distortions. Large implicit subsidies, reported in some cases to exceed 90% of value, shielded inefficient firms and created vested interests that complicated the later move to a unified exchange rate. The gap between effective rates also encouraged corruption, including under-invoicing of exports, smuggling of primary commodities, and fictitious export transactions to access foreign exchange and parallel markets. The scheme is also described as having redistributed income from agriculture toward industrial importers and manufacturers and as contributing to economic divergence between East and West Pakistan.

== Abolition ==
Bangladesh ended the scheme shortly after secession in December 1971. In Pakistan, the EBS was abolished in May 1972 as part of broader foreign exchange and trade reforms, and the rupee was devalued to a unified exchange rate.
