= Madina Colony =

Madina Colony (Urdu: مدینہ کالونی) may refer to:

- Madina Colony (New Karachi Town), Union Council (U.C. # 7) of New Karachi Town, Karachi, Sindh, Pakistan
- Madina Colony (Orangi Town), Union Council (U.C. # 5) of Orangi Town, Karachi, Sindh, Pakistan
- Madina Colony (Naseera), Union Council Sehna of Kharian, Kharian Cantt, Gujrat, Pakistan
