= Fatima Jinnah (disambiguation) =

Fatima Jinnah (1893–1967) was a Pakistani dental surgeon, author, and one of the founders of Pakistan.

Fatima Jinnah may also refer to:

== Places ==
- Fatima Jinnah Colony, a neighborhood in Karachi, Sindh, Pakistan
- Fatima Jinnah Park, a public park in Islamabad, Pakistan

== Schools and colleges ==
- Fatima Jinnah Dental College in Karachi, Pakistan
- Fatima Jinnah Medical University in Lahore, Punjab, Pakistan
- Fatima Jinnah Women University in Rawalpindi, Pakistan
- Khatoon-e-Pakistan Degree College for Women in Karachi, Pakistan

== See also ==
- Fatima (disambiguation)
