= Mohra Gujarn =

Mohra Gujran is a village near Mandra, Tehsil Gujran Khan, in the Rawalpindi District of Pakistan. Mohra Gujran comes under union council Kuri Dolal. Its neighboring villages are Gunja Mehra, Mohra Mando, Faisal Colony and Mohra Mishran. It is named after the Gujar tribe.

Location of Mohra Gujran in Pakistan
