= My Brother (book) =

Book attributed to Fatima Jinnah, sister of Muhammad Ali Jinnah

- Author: Fatima Jinnah
- Language: English
- Genre: Biography
- Publisher: Quaid-i-Azam Academy
- Publication date: 1987
- Publication place: Pakistan
- Media type: Print (hardback)
- ISBN: 978-969-413-036-1

My Brother is the biography of Muhammad Ali Jinnah, the founder of Pakistan, attributed to his sister Fatima Jinnah. It is claimed that the publication of Hector Bolitho's book, Jinnah Creator of Pakistan, in 1954 prompted her to write about her brother as it was felt that Bolitho's book had failed to bring out the political aspects of her brother's life. It was published by the Quaid-i-Azam Academy in 1987, although Fatima Jinnah died in 1967.

The book focused on his political aspirations and how his failing health affected them. The Daily Times summarised it as "...he was aware of the peril his failing health posed, thus wanted to do whatever he could to build the new country whose existence was precarious owing to lack of resources and enormous challenges on the economic and political fronts." It explores his feelings of betrayal in old age and sickness, for example, when picked up by an ambulance when struggling to breathe, it ran out of fuel, and he then lay in wait for an hour for another to come.
