= Fatima Jinnah =

Pakistani politician and author (1893–1967)

Madar-e-Millat Khatun-e-Pakistan Mohtarma Fatima Jinnah
- فَاطِمَہْ جِنَاحْ

Personal details
- Born: 31 July 1893 Kathiawar, Bombay Presidency
- Died: 9 July 1967 (aged 73) Karachi, West Pakistan, Pakistan
- Resting place: Mazar-e-Quaid
- Party: All-India Muslim League (1937–1947); Muslim League (1947–1954); Combined Opposition Parties (1964–1965)
- Relations: See Jinnah family
- Parent(s): Jinnahbhai Poonja; Mithibai Jinnah
- Education: Bandra Convent, Bandra; St. Patrick's School, Bandra; Dr. R. Ahmed Dental College and Hospital
- Occupation: Politician, dental surgeon, author, activist
- Known for: Pakistan Movement; 1965 Pakistani presidential election First woman to qualify as a dentist in British India
- Nickname(s): Madar-e-Millat; Khatun-e-Pakistan

Fatima Jinnah (Note: Urdu: فاطمہ جناح) (31 July 1893 – 9 July 1967) was a Pakistani politician, stateswoman, author, and activist. She was the younger sister of Muhammad Ali Jinnah, the founder and first governor-general of Pakistan.

After obtaining a dental degree from the University of Calcutta in 1923, she became the first woman to qualify as a dentist in British India. She was a close associate and adviser to her brother, accompanying him throughout the Pakistan Movement and participating in the activities of the All-India Muslim League. After the independence of Pakistan, she assisted in the settlement of Muhajirs and established the Women's Relief Committee, which later evolved into the All Pakistan Women's Association. She remained the closest confidant of her brother until his death. After his death, Fatima was prevented from addressing the nation until 1951; her 1951 radio address was interrupted, which many believed was an attempt by the Liaquat Ali Khan government to censor her. She wrote the book My Brother in 1955, but it was only published 32 years later, in 1987. According to journalist Akhtar Baloch, before its publication, Sharif al Mujahid removed several pages, stating that they were "against the ideology of Pakistan".

In 1964–65, Fatima accepted the nomination of the Combined Opposition Parties (COP) to contest the 1965 presidential election against President Ayub Khan. During her campaign, she criticised Ayub's military rule and called for the restoration of democracy and civil rights. Although Ayub won through the Basic democracy electoral college system, Fatima received strong support in East Pakistan and urban centres, and the opposition alleged widespread electoral malpractice. Following the election, she largely withdrew from public life and spent her remaining years at Mohatta Palace in Karachi.

Fatima died in Karachi on 9 July 1967, sparking controversy with rumours of unnatural causes. Although her nephew, Akbar Pirbhai, called for an inquiry, no official report was issued. Nearly half a million people attended her funeral in Karachi. According to Akbar Ahmed, her legacy is associated with her opposition to military rule and her role as a symbol of democratic Pakistan. She is commonly known as Madar-e-Millat ("Mother of the Nation") and Khatun-e-Pakistan ("Lady of Pakistan"), and numerous institutions and public spaces in Pakistan have been named in her honour.

== Early life and education ==
Fatima was born into the Jinnah family on 31 July 1893, the youngest daughter to Jinnahbhai Poonja and his wife Mithibai, in Kathiawar, Gujarat, during the Bombay Presidency in British India. Her parents belonged to the Ismaili Shia Khoja community, a mercantile group with roots in the princely state of Gondal in Kathiawar that migrated to Karachi in the late nineteenth century. Jinnahbhai and Mithibai were among the migrants who settled in Karachi's Kharadar district. Fatima lost her mother at an early age when Mithibai died in 1895 following childbirth. After her mother's death, Fatima was raised primarily by her siblings and extended family, particularly a paternal aunt who played an important role in her childhood.

Fatima had seven siblings: four brothers — Muhammad Ali, Ahmad Ali, Bunde Ali, and Bachu — and three sisters — Rahmat, Maryam, and Shireen. Among her siblings, Fatima was closest to Muhammad Ali, who became her guardian after their father's death in 1901. Following their father's death, Muhammad Ali took an active interest in Fatima's education, enrolling her at Bombay's Bandra Convent in 1902. He later enrolled her at St. Patrick's School, where she completed her Senior Cambridge examination in 1913. Fatima lived with her brother until 1918, when he married Rattanbai Petit. In 1919, she enrolled at the University of Calcutta and studied at the Dr. R. Ahmed Dental College. After graduating in 1923, she became the first woman to qualify as a dentist in British India. With Muhammad Ali's support, she then established a dental practice in Bombay in 1923.

Following Rattanbai's death in February 1929, she closed her dental clinic, moved into Muhammad Ali's bungalow to care for her niece, Dina Jinnah, and assumed responsibility for managing his household. This transition began the lifelong companionship that lasted until her brother's death on 11 September 1948.

== Political career ==
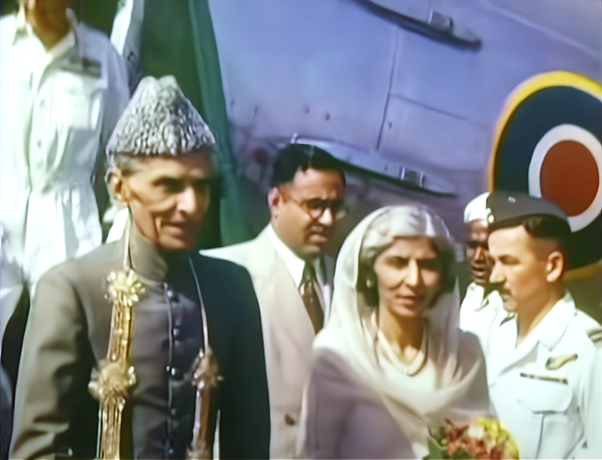
Fatima accompanies her brother, Muhammad Ali Jinnah, as he arrives in Lahore in 1948 to discuss the Kashmir crisis.

Fatima accompanied her brother to every public appearance that he made. She travelled to London, England in 1930, returned to Bombay for a year, and then went back to England in 1931, where she lived for four years. After they returned to India, Fatima began participating directly in the activities of the All-India Muslim League in support of her brother's political efforts. Muhammad Ali later acknowledged the importance of Fatima's encouragement and support in his most important political decisions.

She first attended a session of the All-India Muslim League in 1937 and subsequently attended all of its annual sessions from 1940 onwards, including the Lahore session in March 1940, during which she assumed responsibility for organising women in support of the League. In February 1941, she helped organise the All India Muslim Women Students Federation in Delhi. According to Lawrence Ziring, although Fatima never held political office, she played an important role in supporting Muhammad Ali, particularly during his illness in 1943. Ziring writes that her support helped him continue his efforts toward the creation of Pakistan. She supported the Two-nation theory, which subsequently played a crucial role in the creation of Pakistan in 1947. She served on the Working Committee of the Bombay Provincial Muslim League until 1947.

In August 1947, Fatima accompanied Muhammad Ali on his flight from Delhi to Karachi and stepped onto the soil of the newly independent state of Pakistan with him. On 11 August 1947, Fatima watched from the visitors' gallery as the Constituent Assembly of Pakistan held its inaugural session, during which Muhammad Ali was elected its president. She assisted in the settlement of Muhajirs in the newly established state of Pakistan.

=== Role in women's movement ===
Fatima mobilised Muslim women during the Pakistan Movement. At a time when most Muslim women were confined to household work and were not actively involved in politics, her leadership helped change this dynamic. A separate women's organisation was established within the All-India Muslim League for this purpose, and Fatima led its activities, including heading processions organised by the Central Committee. She also urged Muslim women to participate in the Pakistan Movement.

Fatima's efforts brought thousands of women into the fold of the Muslim League, giving rise to what became known as the women's movement. She trained women to meet the challenges ahead, providing instruction in first aid and service in the National Guards, and established educational institutions for them. In 1947, during the civil disobedience movement against the Unionist Government of Punjab Province, women in Lahore participated in processions and courted arrest under her leadership. Later that year, amid the transfer of power, Fatima established the Women's Relief Committee, an organisation that later evolved into the All Pakistan Women's Association.

=== Views ===
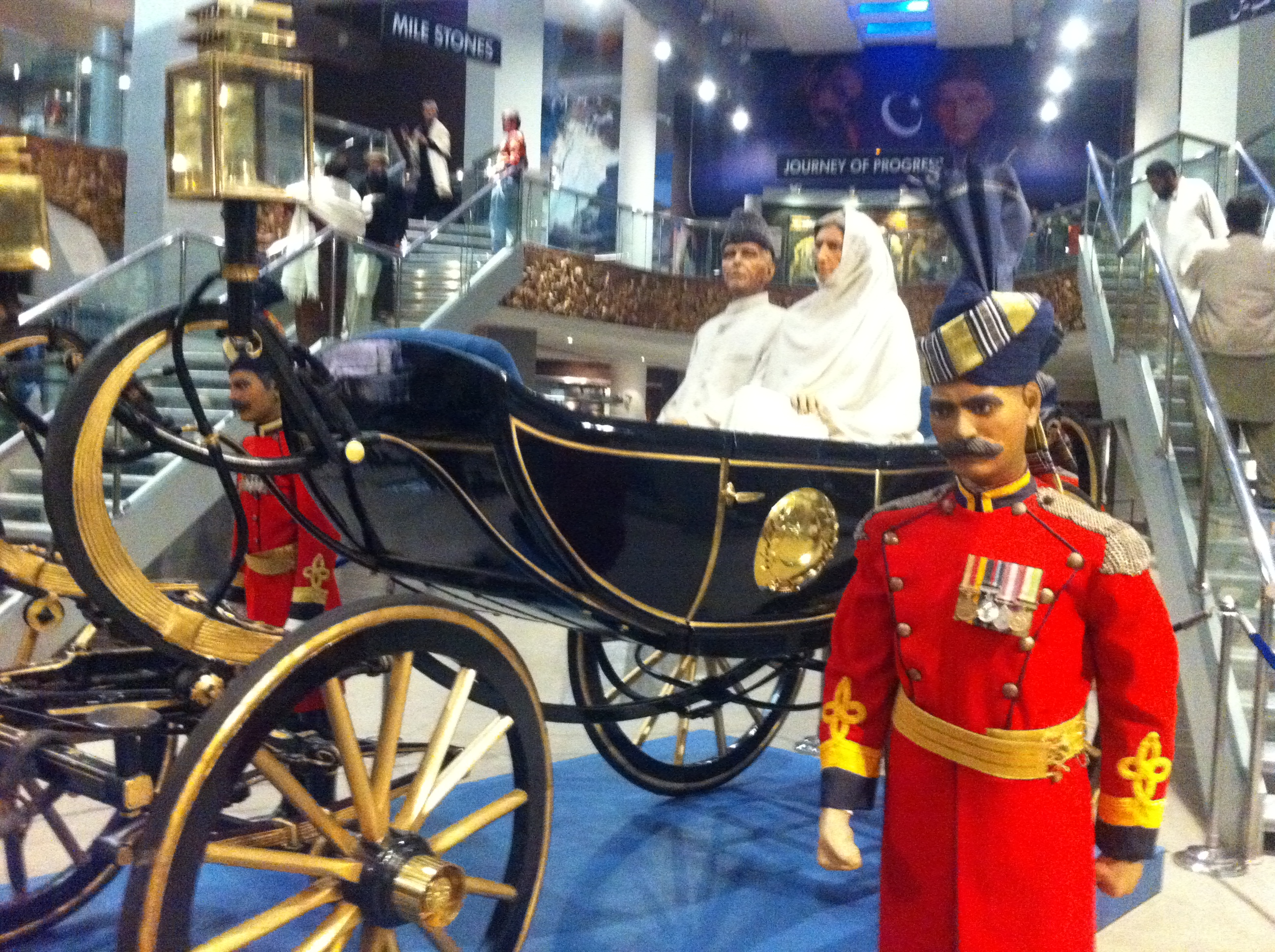
Statues of Fatima and Muhammad Ali Jinnah at the Pakistan Monument in Islamabad

In 1949, during a visit to the North-West Frontier Province, where provincialism and separatist sentiments had long been a concern, Fatima addressed a public gathering in Peshawar. She urged them to "[e]schew all personal and factionalism recriminations . . . [to] strengthen the hands of the popular government in all their nation-building programs." Similarly, in the polarizing Punjab elections of 1951, her message to the public was to "vote fearlessly for the right person; do not be cowed down by threats or lured by promises. The vote is a sacred trust and not to be bought or sold." While she refrained from endorsing any specific side, her concerns grew later that year as defections from the Muslim League became increasingly visible. Speaking at a women's gathering in Multan in December 1951, she cautioned against provincialism, describing it as "the greatest danger to the stability of the state," and urged vigilance to prevent its spread.

After Muhammad Ali's death, Fatima was prevented from addressing the nation until 1951; her 1951 radio address was interrupted, which many believed was an attempt by the Liaquat Ali Khan government to censor her.

Her commitment to women's empowerment was evident in a speech delivered soon after the formation of the Punjab government under Mumtaz Daultana in 1951, where she proclaimed the "onward march towards emancipation and freedom of women" and noted their increasing participation in social, educational, and political activities, including roles as members of legislatures and the Constituent Assembly.

In a 1953 broadcast by Radio Pakistan marking the death anniversary of Muhammad Ali, Fatima spoke about the Kashmir issue, stating that "Under the leadership of the Quaid-i-Azam, 80 million Mussalmans got freedom from the clutches of two of the most powerful forces [British and Hindu]. Four million Mussalmans of Kashmir are now yearning for the taste of that freedom for themselves and for the right of self-determination." She questioned whether it should have been so difficult for Pakistan, as an established state, to assist Kashmiris in achieving their objectives.

In the same broadcast, Fatima criticised the delays in drafting Pakistan's constitution and urged the Constituent Assembly to resolve not to disperse until its work was completed. She also highlighted "sectarianism" and "provincialism" as key obstacles to Pakistan's progress, calling for their eradication. This speech followed the anti-Ahmadi violence earlier that year.

In another message to the nation on Muhammad Ali's birthday in 1953, she addressed the people of East Bengal, urging them to safeguard unity and avoid disunity during the upcoming elections. She encouraged them to reorganise and revitalize the Muslim League, emphasizing its historic foundation in Dhaka in 1906. Fatima publicly endorsed the Muslim League for the first time during the 1954 provincial elections in East Bengal. She toured the region, urging people to vote for the party. According to biographer Reza M. Pirbhai, Fatima's endorsement reflected a misreading of public sentiment in Bengal, where opposition to the Muslim League had grown amid the national language controversy and the underrepresentation of Bengalis in the civil and military services. He writes that the All-Pakistan Awami League's victory confirmed the widespread discontent with the Muslim League's leadership in the region.

=== Calls to enter active politics ===
In 1954, following the rout of the Muslim League in East Bengal's provincial elections, numerous appeals emerged urging Fatima to assume a leadership role. Support came from across Pakistan, including private citizens, journalists, professional associations, Muslim League chapters, and members of the Provincial Assembly of West Pakistan. A man from Karachi wrote, "A disconsolate nation turns to you as to a mother for solace...You alone can galvanize us once more into action and lead us along during the second stage of our march." Similarly, a journalist from Dhaka implored her to accept the presidency of the Muslim League, calling her "the ablest person to lead and guide this organization."

Calls for her leadership continued over the following years. In 1955, the Karachi Bar Association passed a resolution urging her "to come forward and actively lead the nation", while the City Muslim League chapter of Hyderabad declared that she alone commanded the "highest honour and regard of the masses." After the death of Muslim League President Abdul Rab Nishtar in 1958, several women from the Provincial Assembly of West Pakistan, including Jahanara Shahnawaz, urged Fatima to accept the presidency of the Pakistan Muslim League, with support from Muslim League chapters such as the chapter in Rahim Yar Khan.

=== 1965 presidential election ===
In 1964–65, Fatima accepted the nomination of the Combined Opposition Parties (COP) – a group of six opposition parties – to run against Ayub Khan in the 1965 Pakistani presidential election. According to Reza M. Pirbhai, the opposition parties lacked cohesion and unity of purpose. Their leaders were discredited by past political roles, had strained personal relations even within their own parties, and none enjoyed nationwide popularity. It was for these reasons that they eventually selected Fatima as their presidential candidate.

The COP announced a nine-point programme on 24 July 1964, which called for a democratic constitution based on adult franchise, the release of political prisoners, repeal of repressive laws, economic and administrative reforms to address disparities between West and East Pakistan, minority rights, a plebiscite-based resolution of the Kashmir dispute, a nonaligned foreign policy, amendment of family laws, and promotion of unity between the two wings of the country. Fatima distanced herself from the COP's Nine-Point programme during her presidential campaign. While she supported adult franchise, she did not endorse the rest of the agenda. When questioned directly—such as during a meeting with tribal leaders in Peshawar on 10 December 1964—she responded that she was "no dictator" and believed that such issues, including the Muslim Family Laws Ordinance, should be decided democratically in accordance with the will of the people.

During the campaign, she and her supporters openly referred to Ayub as a dictator. In her speeches, Fatima strongly criticised Ayub's dictatorial regime and called for a restoration of democracy and civil rights, which she framed as the unfulfilled goals of the Pakistan Movement. In her rallies in East Pakistan, nearly 300,000 people thronged to see her in Dhaka, and a million greeted her in Chittagong after a nearly thirty-hour train journey covering just 200 miles—delayed as crowds swarmed the tracks at every station, compelling her to appear so they could catch a glimpse of her. Addressing in Dhaka, she said: "On the one side is the road to dictatorship, on the other side there is freedom and human dignity . . . On the one side your destinies are in the pocket of one individual, on the other your destinies are in your own hands."

Ayub criticised Fatima's clothing as unbecoming of a "Mother of the Nation," and portrayed her as pro-Indian and pro-American. Ayub declared that a woman was not fit to rule and secured the backing of sections of the Barelvi ulama, while the Deobandi ulama and pro-Islamic parties—despite their general hostility to women in public life—reluctantly supported Fatima for pragmatic reasons. Although Maulana Maududi and the Jamaat-e-Islami had previously declared that a woman could not hold the highest office in a Muslim country, the party endorsed Fatima as its candidate while Maududi was in prison. Upon his release, Maududi supported this decision, describing it as necessary to combat what he considered the greater evil of Ayub's martial law regime: "On one side is a man; other than his gender there is nothing good about him; on the other is a woman; aside from her gender nothing is wrong about her."

Fatima criticised the Indus Waters Treaty signed between Pakistan and India in 1960 under Ayub. Speaking at a large public meeting in Jhelum on 19 November 1964, she warned that the treaty could have long-term environmental consequences for West Pakistan. Fatima said that the bunds constructed as part of the water-sharing arrangements would become choked with silt within 50 years and that the diversion of river water could eventually leave West Pakistan barren. She questioned the legitimacy of the agreement, accusing Ayub of having "sold away" the future interests of the country without the people's consent.

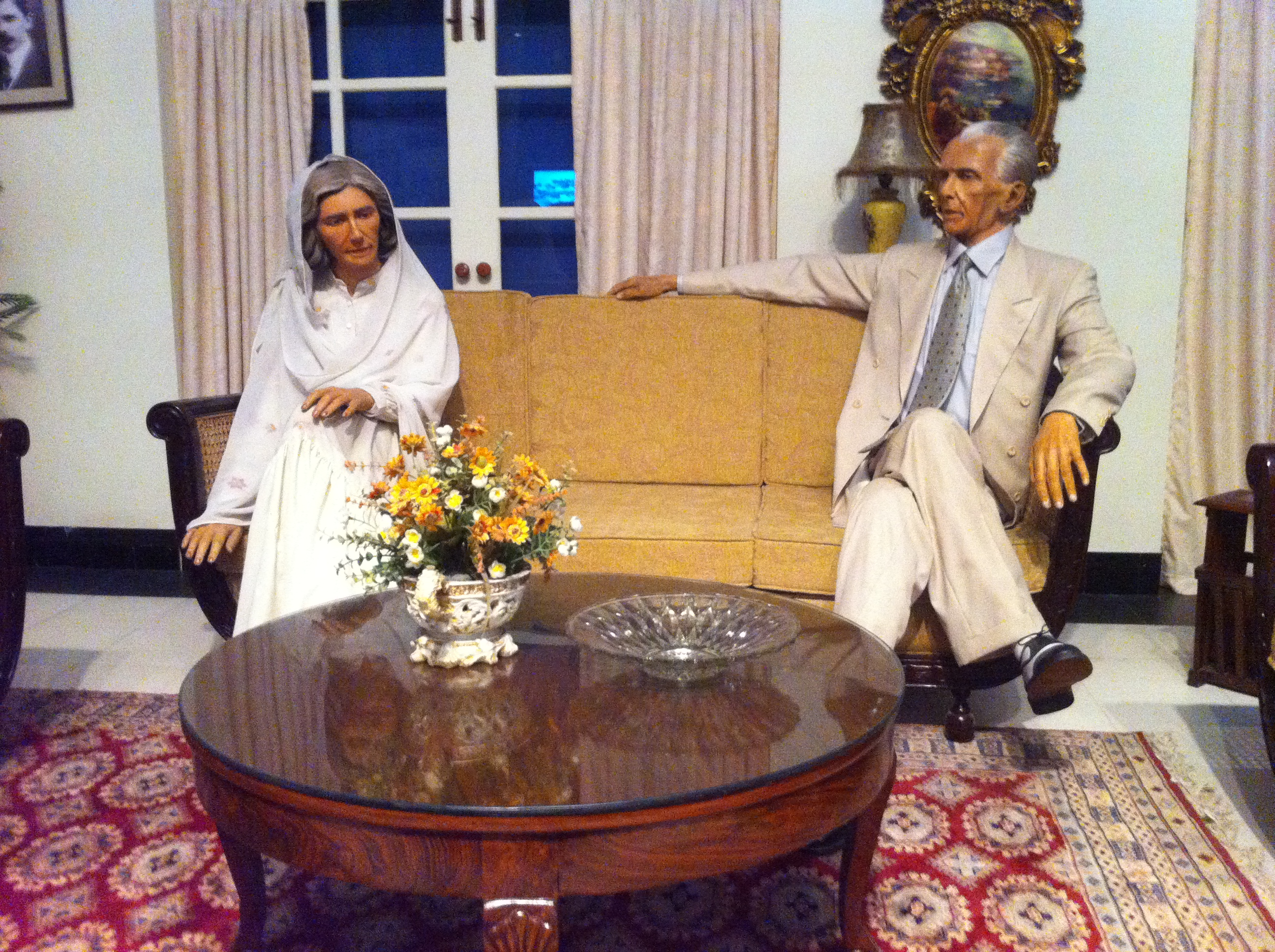
Wax statues of Fatima and her brother Muhammad Ali at Madame Tussauds in London.

The election was conducted through an indirect system of basic democracy rather than by a direct vote of the population. Between 31 October and 19 November 1964, elections were held to select 80,000 Basic Democrats, who were not affiliated with political parties but were actively courted by both Ayub and Fatima's camps. They were tasked with voting in the presidential election scheduled for 2 January 1965. These individuals were intended to serve as the electoral college and represent the people's choice. However, according to Nitin A. Gokhale, they were handpicked by local civil and military officials for their loyalty and could be trusted to vote as directed by the regime.

The election resulted in Ayub's victory, though Fatima received strong support across East Pakistan and urban centres. She won majorities in three of the country's sixteen administrative divisions: Karachi, Dhaka, and Chittagong. Widespread allegations of rigging and electoral manipulation were reported by her supporters. Historian Ayesha Jalal writes that the entire administrative machinery was mobilised in support of Ayub and that the election was marked by financial irregularities, misuse of government resources, and widespread electoral malpractice. Ayub secured a comfortable majority of 49,951 votes (63.3%) from the 80,000-member Basic Democrats electoral college, while Fatima received 28,691 votes (36.4%), with her vote share being 47 percent in East Pakistan. Opposition claimed that if the elections had been held on the basis of adult franchise, Fatima would have won by an overwhelming majority. Dismissing the election as a farce, Fatima declared that the "so-called victory of Mr. Ayub Khan" would ultimately be "his greatest defeat."

=== Later years ===
Following the election, Fatima largely withdrew from active politics. In her Independence Day message on 14 August 1965, she urged Pakistanis to dedicate themselves to building "a true democratic society." She did not resume active political involvement during the Indo-Pakistan war later that year. In 1965, she moved from Flagstaff House to Mohatta Palace in Karachi, where she spent the remainder of her life. There, she largely lived a private life, appearing in public mainly on special occasions.

== Personal life ==
Fatima remained unmarried and had no children. She did not observe purdah and appeared publicly without seclusion throughout her life, consistently wearing saris and later shalwar kameez.

Her unfinished biography of her brother Muhammad Ali Jinnah, My Brother, was published posthumously, by the Quaid-i-Azam Academy in 1987. According to journalist Akhtar Baloch, Fatima wrote the book in 1955, but it remained unpublished for 32 years. Before its publication, Sharif al Mujahid removed several pages, stating, "Those pages were against the ideology of Pakistan and I had to take care of it."

== Death ==
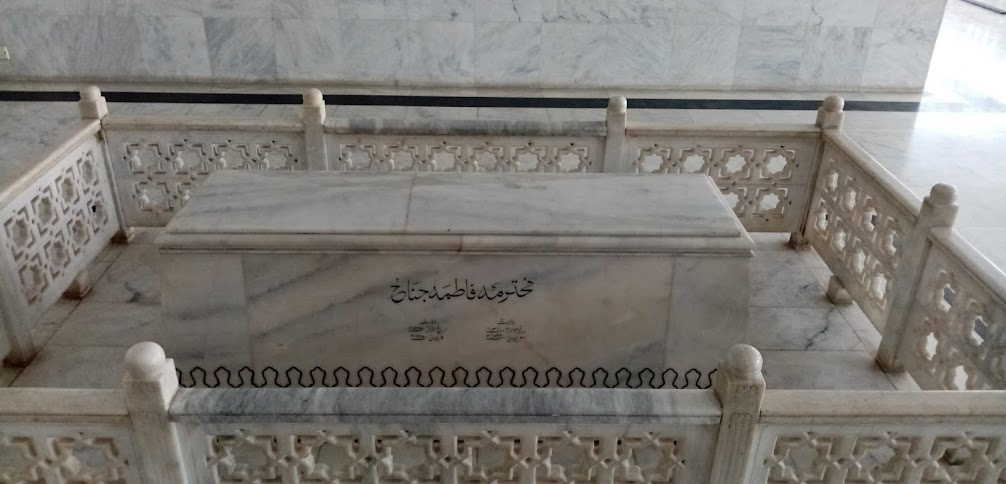
Tomb of Fatima Jinnah in Karachi

Fatima died in Karachi on 9 July 1967. Her death became the subject of controversy, with rumours suggesting unnatural causes, including murder. However, there was no concrete evidence to substantiate these claims. Her nephew, Akbar Pirbhai, requested an inquiry, but after the provincial government took over the investigation, no official report was ever produced or made public. Rumors persisted, leading to a citizen's appeal for a judicial inquiry in 1972, but no further action was taken.

Her funeral rites reflected sectarian sensitivities. Ithna Ashari Shia rites were performed in private at her home, while a Sunni cleric was appointed to lead the public funeral prayers. The funeral, held on 11 July 1967, was declared a public holiday, with flags flown at half-mast. She was buried next to her brother, Muhammad Ali Jinnah, at Mazar-e-Quaid in Karachi, following sustained public pressure for her burial there. The funeral procession drew nearly half a million people, with crowds gathering along the route and pressing to get close to her remains.

== Biographies ==
Several biographies of Fatima were published in Pakistan during her lifetime and after her death. Before her death, three short biographies were authored by Pakistani scholars: Ibrahim Jalees's Fatima Jinnah (1951), Khalid Mahmud's Madar-i-Millat (1964), and Abdul Mannan's Madar-i-Millat (1965). Following her death in 1967, additional biographies appeared, including Manzar Bashir's Madar-i-Millat: Raushni aur Umid ki Shua (1968), Kavish Rizvi's Fatima Jinnah: Samraj aur Inqilab (1970), Agha Husain Hamdani's Fatima Jinnah: Hayat aur Khidmat (1978), Saira Hashmi's Ek Tassur Do Shakhsiyaten (1995), and Agha Ashraf's Madar-i-Millat Fatima Jinnah (2000). Publications on her life expanded significantly after the state declared 2003 the "Year of Fatima Jinnah." During that year, numerous books, collections of speeches and writings, documentaries, and shorter works were published in multiple languages.

== Honours and legacy ==
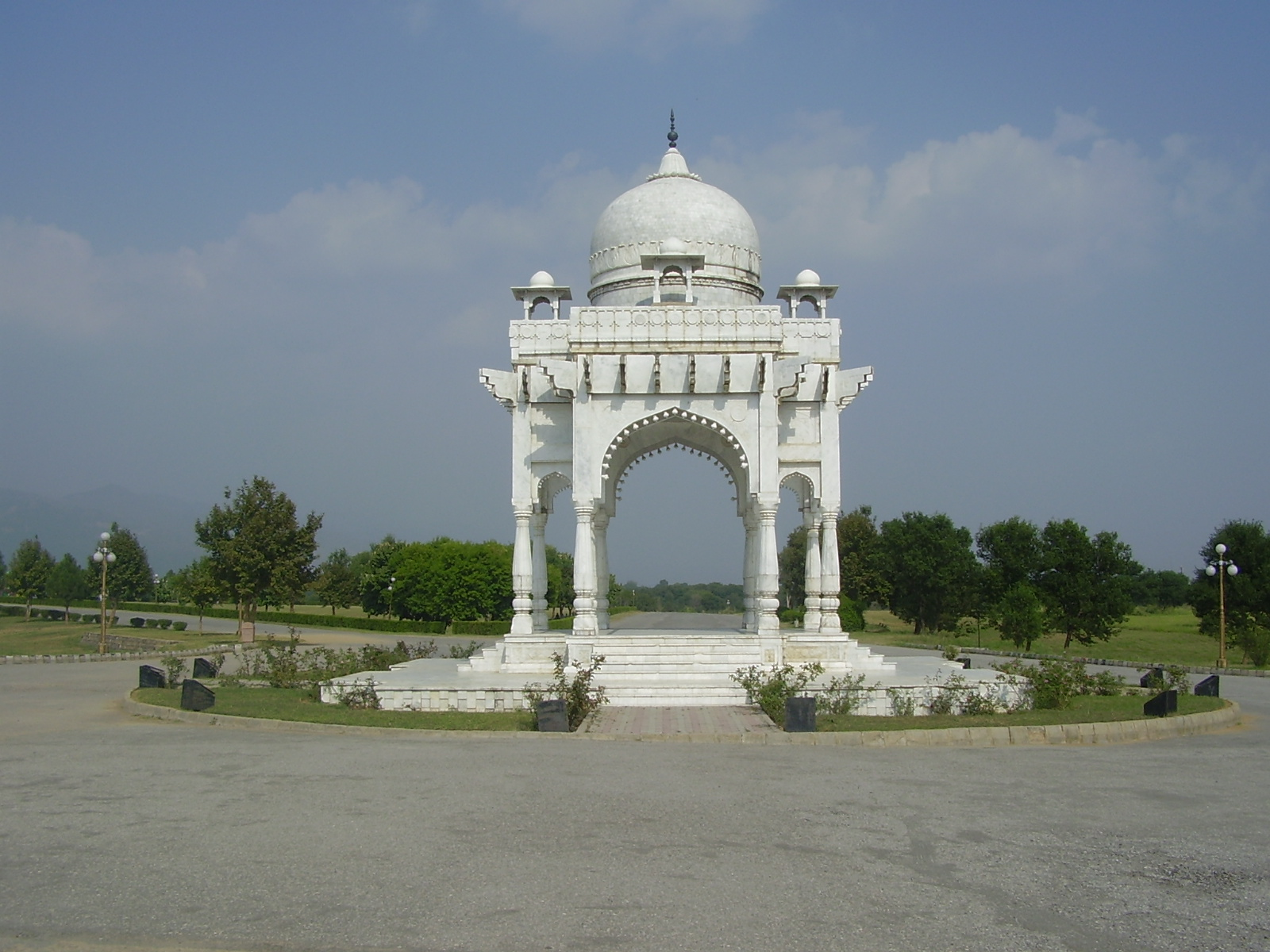
A monument in Fatima Jinnah Park containing a commemorative plaque

According to Akbar Ahmed, Fatima's legacy is associated with her opposition to military rule and her role as a symbol of democratic Pakistan. She is commonly known as Madar-e-Millat ("Mother of the Nation") and Khatun-e-Pakistan ("Lady of Pakistan"). The Government of Pakistan declared 2003 the Mohtarma Fatima Jinnah Year, during which various programmes were organised in her honour. As part of the commemorations, the Ministry of Women Development, Social Welfare and Special Education established the Mohtarma Fatima Jinnah Gold Medal to recognise women for outstanding achievements in various fields. The ministry stated that the medal was instituted in recognition of Fatima's role in the Pakistan Movement. Numerous institutions and public spaces in Pakistan have been named in her honour, including Fatima Jinnah Medical University, Fatima Jinnah Women University, and Fatima Jinnah Park.

== In popular culture ==
In the 1998 film Jinnah, the role of Fatima was played by Shireen Shah. In 2025, Fatima was portrayed by actress Ira Dubey in the Sony LIV historical web series Freedom at Midnight. The series, adapted from the 1975 non-fiction book Freedom at Midnight by Larry Collins and Dominique Lapierre, depicts events surrounding the end of British rule in India and the creation of Pakistan.

== See also ==
- List of Pakistan Movement activists
- Fatima Jinnah Dental College
- Fatima Jinnah Colony
