= Muslim Town =

Muslim Town may refer to:

- Muslim Town, Karachi, Sindh, Pakistan
- Muslim Town, Lahore, Punjab, Pakistan
