= Combined Opposition Parties =

- Abbreviation: COP
- Leader: Fatima Jinnah
- Founder: Khawaja Nazimuddin (Note: Originally Nazimuddin gave the idea to establish the COP, but many other leaders worked together to found the COP, therefore he cannot be accredited as the sole undisputed founder.)
- Founded: July 21, 1964
- Merger of: CML; AL; NAP; NAP(W); JI; NIP
- Ideology: Parliamentary democracy Anti-Ayub Khan; Minority rights
- Political position: Big tent

Election symbol
- Lantern

The Combined Opposition Parties (COP) was a Pakistani coalition of 6 to 13 political parties founded on July 21, 1964, to run in the 1965 presidential, and general election against field marshal Ayub Khan and his authoritarian regime

The COP was founded by Khawaja Nazimuddin among other political leaders in an attempt to challenge the military president Ayub Khan, who had imposed martial law since 1958. The group was made up of various political parties with differing ideologies and struggled to pick a single candidate in the 1965 election to run against Ayub, but eventually settled on Fatima Jinnah. The COP followed Chaudhri Muhammad Ali’s nine points as its official ideology.

Following the 1965 election results, which came in favor of Ayub, the coalition was divided, and eventually dissolved due to efforts by the Council Muslim League to dominate the group.

== Members ==
The exact number of parties in the coalition is not exactly known but studies claim it consisted of the 5, 6 or 13 leading opposition parties. The party members included the socialist National Awami Party led by Maulana Bashani, and its northwestern faction, the National Awami Party (Wali) led by Abdul Wali Khan, the Islamist party, the Jamaat-e-Islami led by the popular Abul A'la Maududi, the anti-Ayub Council Muslim League led by Khawaja Nazimuddin, the lesser-known Niazam-e-Islam Party of Chaudhry Mohammad Ali and the East Pakistani Awami League led by Mujibur Rehman.

The fact that many of these party members' ideologies were contradictory, demonstrated that Ayub Khan's policies were extremely unpopular.

== History ==
=== Foundation ===
Khawaja Nazimuddin, president of the Council Muslim League, traveled Pakistan, and met with the leaders of various political groups, he talked about the political state of affairs as the presidential election of January 1965 was getting closer. Talks began between major political movements and parties throughout the country for a united front in politics.

As a result, on July 21, 1964, in Dhaka, the opposition parties united to form the Combined Opposition Parties (COP).

=== Party leadership ===
As a coalition the COP did not have one exclusive leader, as it was made up of several different parties with independent leaders. In 1964, the COP considered nominating Azam Khan to run against President Ayub Khan on their behalf in the 1965 Pakistani presidential election, due to Azam's widespread popularity. However, Maulana Bhashani, a founding member of the Awami League, convinced the opposition to nominate Fatima Jinnah instead. Some speculate that Bhashani believed Fatima would be a weaker candidate and suggested her candidacy to ensure Ayub Khan's victory, as he was favoured by the Chinese. Due to disagreements between left-wing and right-wing parties, it was contested who should have run for President of Pakistan on behalf of the COP against Ayub Khan, causing neither side to reach a clear candidate. Khawaja Nazimuddin was considered for the role but his elderly condition hindered any idea of party leadership.

Earlier, when the COP agreed to unite behind a single candidate, they required that the candidate must have unanimous support from all member parties. Bhashani reportedly added another condition: that no one associated with the Martial Law administration, would be acceptable. Several sources indicate that Ayub Khan's foreign minister, Zulfikar Ali Bhutto, orchestrated the entire strategy to block Azam Khan's candidacy. He did so through Masihur Rahman, a mutual friend of both Bhutto and Bhashani, by providing Masihur Rahman with 500,000 rupees to pass on to Bhashani, all in an effort to ensure Ayub’s victory by having a weaker opponent, Fatima Jinnah, run against him. Days before the election, Bhashani and his group withdrew their support for Fatima. Nevertheless, Azam supported Fatima Jinnah and actively campaigned for her and was noted as having contributed to her success in East Pakistan." Fatima was also chosen due to her being the brother of Pakistan’s founder Muhammad Ali Jinnah.

As a result, Fatima Jinnah led the campaign against Ayub Khan in 1965 and urged Pakistanis to vote with care in the elections, and became a serious contender against Ayub's campaign and his party, the Convention Muslim League.

=== Campaign ===
The COP faced challenges and crackdowns by Ayub Khan's government. Ayub accused Miss Jinnah of being a weak leader and claimed that she was being exploited by the COP's power hungry, corrupt leaders. Her campaign was plagued with unfair and unequal election campaign, poor finances, and indirect elections through the democratic system were some of the primary problems she faced. However, she had overwhelming support among the public.

== Ideology ==
The Combined Opposition parties laid out their nine points as an official manifesto and ideological principle in 1964. Chaudhry Muhammad Ali unveiled the following points for the parties ideology:

Demands for full guarantees of all basic rights of the people; direct election based on adult franchise; federal parliamentary structure guaranteeing full provincial autonomy, curtailment of the powers of the President; independence of judiciary based on separation of judiciary from the executive; withdrawal of ban on the functioning of political parties and release of all political prisoners and repeal of all repressive laws. Removal of economic disparity between the two Wings of Pakistan and to equalize the per capita income between the two Wings; to provide equality of opportunity and the widest possible distribution of wealth; effective and speedy settlement of refugees; and effective measures for flood control in both Wings. Full guarantee for the rights of minorities, in particular their right to practice their religion and develop their culture. Other points were solution of the Kashmir problem in accordance with the UN resolutions; an independent foreign policy keeping in view the honor and interests of Pakistan; implementation of Islamic provisions of the constitution and establishment of true Islamic society along with amendments of the Family Laws Ordinance.

- The Nine Points of the COP,

Other than the nine official points, the party was strictly Anti-Ayub Khan, accusing him of founding a military dictatorship. The COP advocated for an establishment of a parliamentary democracy in the country where the Constituent Assembly was re-empowered, the party also held Islamic tendencies, due to membership by the Jamaat-e-Islami and Maududi.

Ayub Khan responded to the nine-point manifesto by establishing his own manifesto of industrial growth, secularism, and the self-determination guarantee to Kashmiris.

== Decline ==
=== 1965 election results ===
The election results came in favor of the incumbent President Ayub Khan, who, despite losing the popular vote, won 62.43% of the Electoral vote. Fatima Jinnah won 35.86% of the electoral college votes. Jinnah was however extremely successful in some areas of the country. She had swept across major urban centres such as Karachi and Dhaka. Ayub also faced disappointing results in East Pakistan. However, Ayub had decisively triumphed in rural Pakistan. As majority of the Electoral College consisted of representatives from the rural setup, Ayub was able to win a clear majority.

The election results were not accepted by the Combined Opposition Parties, who accused Ayub of rigging. The COP staged demonstrations and protests, however, did not gain much public support as Fatimah Jinnah, accepted the election results. The Election had an effective result. It further strengthened the role of Women in politics in Pakistan.

=== Dissolution ===
The COP discussed in sessions following the presidential election to determine the course of action for the next national and provincial assembly elections. The leaders of this session discussed boycotting the elections as being unrealistic. The coalition was extremely disappointed with the results of the presidential elections which resulted in a victory for Ayub Khan. However, the defeat of the COP in the presidential and subsequent national and provincial assembles elections did not render the organization useless. The COP, thereafter lost its strength and unity as the Council Muslim League made efforts to dominate it. Miss Jinnah though the unanimous candidate of all the component parties of the alliance showed her sympathies for the League and advised other parties of the COP to merge into Council Muslim League and fight against 'undemocratic force' with unity and discipline. The parties focused on their respective political agendas respectively and the alliance became ineffective and politically useless. The alliance splintered and dissolved, as the remaining leadership merged with the Council Muslim League.

== Sources ==
- Hussain, Akhtar (January–June 2018). "Politics of Combined Opposition Parties (Cop) During Ayub Khan Era (1958-1969)" (PDF). Journal of the Punjab University Historical Society. 31 (1).
