= 1960 Pakistani presidential confidence referendum =

- Do you have confidence in President Field Marshal Ayub Khan and the policies and programs adopted by him?

Results
Choice	Votes	%
Yes	75,084	96.37%
No	2,829	3.63%
Valid votes	77,913	99.23%
Invalid or blank votes	608	0.77%
Total votes	78,521	100.00%
Registered voters/turnout	80,000	98.15%

An indirect referendum on confidence in President Muhammad Ayub Khan was held in Pakistan on 14 February 1960, with voters asked whether he should remain president for another five years, having held the position since 1958 after overthrowing the previous government in a military coup.

The vote was held under the basic democracy system introduced after the coup, under which indirect votes were carried out by a 80,000-member electoral college. Its members were elected from single-member constituencies (40,000 in each wing), one for every 600 voters. The elections to the electoral college took place between December 1959 and January 1960 on a non-partisan basis (as political parties were banned).

Around 96% of members of the electoral college voted in favour of Khan. He was sworn in three days after the vote.

== Results ==
Choice	Votes	%
For	75,084	96.37
Against	2,829	3.63
Total	77,913	100.00
Valid votes	77,913	99.23
Invalid/blank votes	608	0.77
Total votes	78,521	100.00
Registered voters/turnout	80,000	98.15
Source: Feldman
