= Mohtarma =

Urdu honorific meaning "Madam" or "Lady"

Mohtarma Fatima Jinnah, celebrated as 'Mādar-e-Millat' (Mother of the Nation) in Pakistan

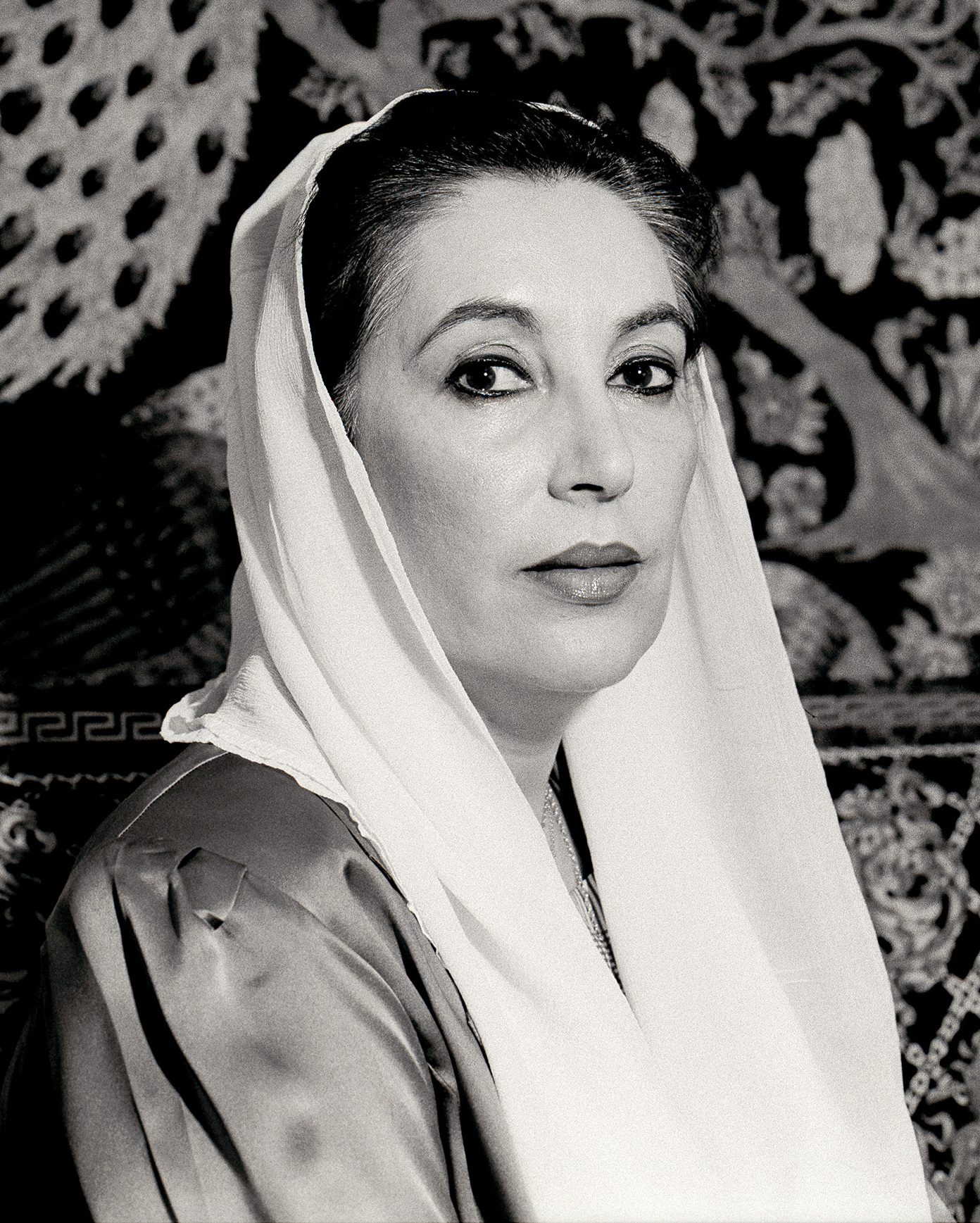
Mohtarma Benazir Bhutto, former prime minister of Pakistan

Mohtarma is an honorific title from South Asia used as a formal address for women in Urdu; which has expanded to various other languages, primarily in Pakistan. Mohtarma is comparable to term Madam or Lady in the English language. The term is rarely used in vernacular language, and is typically reserved as a title used in formal writing or a formal address.

== Etymology ==
The term originates from the Arabic word Muhtaram (مُحْتَرَم), which translates to esteemed or respected. Urdu uses several loanwords from Arabic and Persian, which led to the modification of muhtaram into mohtarma.
