= Sharif al Mujahid =

Pakistani historian, journalist, author, and professor (1926–2020)

Sharif al Mujahid (1 July 1926 – 27 January 2020) was a Pakistani journalist, historian, author, and professor.

== Education and career ==
Al Mujahid was born on 1 July 1926 in Madras, India (modern day Chennai). After finishing his BA degree in 1949, he went on to complete a master's degree in Islamic History at Madras University in 1951. He completed additional MA degrees in journalism in 1952 from Stanford University, and in Islamic Studies from McGill University in 1959.

Al Mujahid joined Karachi University as a lecturer in 1955 and later became a professor on 3 July 1972. He was a founding member of the journalism department (now the department of mass communications) at the same university where he mentored a lot of students in journalism including the noted journalist Muhammad Ali Siddiqui. In 1976, he established the Quaid-i-Azam Academy, where he was the founding director. He served as director at the Quaid-i-Azam Academy until 1989.

As a journalist, before the independence of Pakistan in 1947, Sharif al Mujahid participated as an active journalist, starting in 1945, in favor of Pakistan Movement and frequently wrote newspaper articles expressing his views on the topic.

In Pakistan, he contributed his newspaper columns to Dawn newspaper for about six decades.

Mujahid won a Fulbright-Hays scholarship at Stanford University, was a Research Fellow at Mcgill University and a Fellow at the British Council.

== Awards and recognition ==
- Sitara-i-Imtiaz (Star of Excellence) Award by the President of Pakistan in 2007.
- Lifetime Achievement Award for research work done on the life and achievements of Muhammad Ali Jinnah, the founder of Pakistan by the Jinnah Society in 2018.
- Quaid-i-Azam Jinnah: Studies in Interpretation by Sharif al Mujahid was awarded the President's Award on Best Books on the Quaid-i-Azam in 1981.

== Death and legacy ==
Al Mujahid died of old age on 27 January 2020 at age 93 at his home in North Nazimabad, Karachi and was later buried ay Karachi University Graveyard. Among his survivors are his four daughters.

His collected papers are held by the Sindh Archives.

== Books ==
Al Mujahid wrote several books.

- Quaid-i-Azam and His Times
- Quotes of the Quaid
- In Quest of Jinnah
- The Jinnah Anthology
- A Compendium of Muslim League Documents
- Indian Secularism: A Case Study of the Muslim Minority
- Ideological Foundations of Pakistan
- Ideological Orientation of Pakistan
- Ideology of Pakistan
