= Mazharul Haque (educator) =

Mozaharul Haque
- Born: 1911; Feni
- Died: 1974 (aged 62–63); Dhaka
- Citizenship: Bangladesh
- Education: PhD in Economics
- Alma mater: University of Dhaka
- Occupation: Economist
- Awards: Independence Day Award (1978)

Mozaharul Haque was an economist and academic from Bangladesh. He was awarded the Independence Award in 1978 for his extraordinary contribution to education.

== Biography ==
Haque was born in Noakhali in 1911. He studied at the University of Dhaka.

Haque served as a professor in the Department of Economics at the University of Dhaka. In 1973, he was the president of the Bangladesh Economic Association. He worked as an economic advisor to the government of Bangladesh.

Haque received the Independence Award, Bangladesh's highest civilian award, in 1978 for his contribution to education.

Haque died in 1974.
