= Muslim Town, Karachi =

Muslim Town (Urdu: مسلم ٹاؤن) is one of the neighbourhoods in New Karachi Town of Karachi, Sindh, Pakistan. It is closed to U.P society and Nagan Chorangi.

There are several ethnic groups in Muslim Town including Muhajirs, Sindhis, Kashmiris, Seraikis, Pakhtuns, Balochis, Memons, Bohras, Ismailis, etc.
