= Akhtar Baloch =

Pakistani journalist (1967–2022)

Akhtar Baloch "Karaanchi Wala"
- Born: 1967; Mirpur Khas
- Died: July 31, 2022 (aged 54–55); Karachi, Pakistan
- Other name: Karaanchi Wala
- Occupations: Journalist, Author, Historian, Human rights activist
- Known for: Contributions to journalism and history of Karachi

Akhtar Baloch (1967 – 31 July 2022) was a senior writer, journalist, historian, and analyst from Karachi, Pakistan.

He was renowned for his impact on the field of journalism and his profound understanding of Karachi's historical context. He died in Karachi after a brief illness on 31 July 2022.

== Early life and career ==
Akhtar Baloch was born in Mirpur Khas, Sindh, Pakistan in 1967. He grew up and lived in that city for the first 30 years of his life. He took part in many literary and political activities during the period and rule of General Muhammad Zia-ul-Haq in Pakistan. During his life, Baloch, an experienced journalist and historian, authored numerous books delving into the rich history of Karachi.

For his literary contributions, as a historian on Urdu literature:

"Akhtar Baloch charts the changing patterns of norms and values in Urdu literature during the second half of the 19th century, especially in light of Sir Syed Ahmed Khan's Aligarh Movement".

Akhtar Baloch also wrote on the topics of karo-kari (honour killings), the Jirga system and some other topics and issues that people of Sindh faced.

In addition to his literary contributions, he held a senior position within the Karachi Union of Journalists (KUJ) and served as a council member for the Human Rights Commission of Pakistan (HRCP).

== Works ==
He was also an author and historian, having penned several books on Karachi's history. Some of his notable works include:

- Karaanchi Wala - his popular newspaper blogs (2013 - 2020)
- Teesri Jins (The Third Gender - transgender community)
- Mein Balochistani
- Yehi Mera Watan
- Umeed-e-Sahar (2009)
- Urdu Adab Mein Insaan Dosti (Humanism in Urdu Literature)

== Death ==
Akhtar Balouch died on 31 July 2022 in Karachi after a brief illness. He was in his 50s at the time of his death.
