= Madina Colony, New Karachi Town =

Residential neighbourhood locality in Karachi, Pakistan

Madina Colony (Urdu: مدینہ کالونی) is a neighborhood in the Karachi Central district of Karachi, Pakistan. It was previously administered as part of New Karachi Town, which was disbanded in 2011.

There are several ethnic groups in Madina Colony and they include Muhajirs, Sindhis, Kashmiris, Seraikis, Pakhtuns, Balochis, Memons, Bohras, Ismailis, etc.
