= Faisal Colony =

Neighborhood of Karachi, Pakistan

Coordinates: 31°09′N 72°39′E

Faisal Colony (Urdu: فیصل کالونی) is a neighborhood in the Karachi Central district of the metropolitan city of Karachi, Pakistan. It was previously administered as part of New Karachi Town, which was disbanded in 2011.

There are several ethnic groups in Faisal Colony including Muhajirs, Sindhis, Punjabis, Kashmiris, Seraikis, Pakhtuns, Balochis, Memons, Bohras, Ismailis, etc. Over 99% of the population is Muslim. The population of New Karachi Town is estimated to be nearly one million.
