= Fatima Jinnah Colony =

Neighbourhood in Pakistan

Fatima Jinnah Colony (Urdu: فاطمہ جناح کالونی) is a neighborhood in the Karachi Central district of Karachi, Pakistan. It was previously administered as part of New Karachi Town, which was disbanded in 2011.

Currently it is renamed as union committee 14 Fatima Jinnah Karachi Central as promulgation of Sindh Local Government Act 2013. The neighborhood includes sector 11-E and 11-H of North Karachi Town, Karachi Central.

There are several ethnic groups in New Karachi Town including Muhajirs, Sindhis, Kashmiris, Seraikis, Pakhtuns, Balochis, Memons, Bohras Ismailis, etc. Over 99% of the population is Muslim.

== See also ==
- Fatima Jinnah
