= K. M. Sheikh =

Pakistani military officer and politician

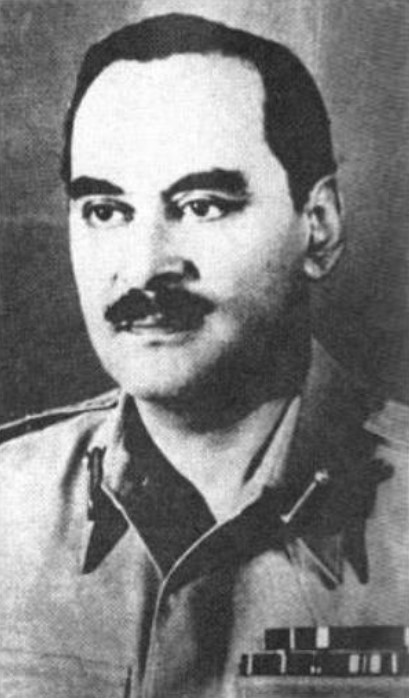

Minister of Home Affairs
- In office 17 February 1960 – 14 June 1960
- President: Muhammad Ayub Khan

Minister for States and Frontier Regions
- In office 17 February 1960 – 5 August 1961
- President: Muhammad Ayub Khan

Minister for Rehabilitation
- In office 15 April 1960 – 8 June 1962
- President: Muhammad Ayub Khan

Minister for Food and Agriculture
- In office 15 April 1960 – 8 June 1962
- President: Muhammad Ayub Khan

Personal details
- Occupation: Military officer

K. M. Sheikh was a Pakistani military officer who served as interior minister of Pakistan during the presidency of Ayub Khan. In the presidential cabinet formed under the Presidential (Election and Constitution) Order, 1960, he held the portfolios of home affairs, states and frontier regions, rehabilitation, and food and agriculture.

== Career ==
Sheikh rose to the rank of lieutenant general in the Pakistan Army.

In the presidential cabinet constituted on 17 February 1960 under Ayub Khan, Sheikh held the home affairs portfolio. In the same cabinet, he also served as minister for states and frontier regions from 17 February 1960 to 5 August 1961. As an interior minister of Pakistan, he visited India and held talks with Indian prime minister Jawaharlal Nehru regarding issues between the two countries. He attended the Indo-Pakistan Border Conference of February 1960.

After cabinet changes in April 1960, Sheikh additionally held the portfolios of rehabilitation and food and agriculture, both of which he retained until 8 June 1962.

By 1969, Sheikh was serving as chairman of the Capital Development Authority.
