= 1965 Pakistani presidential election =

Pakistan's first ever Presidential Elections

- 2 January 1965

80,000 Basic Democrats 40,001 votes needed to win
- Turnout: 79,700 (99.63%)
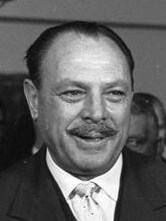

Nominee	Ayub Khan	Fatima Jinnah
Party	PMLC	COP
Electoral vote	49,951	28,691
Percentage	62.43%	35.86%
President before election
Ayub Khan
PMLC
Elected President
Ayub Khan
PMLC

Pakistan's first presidential elections were held on 2 January 1965. The voting was to be indirect, as the President had to be elected by the 80,000 "basic democrats", who made up the Electoral College. These Basic Democrats were democratically elected public representatives who served in the Divisional, District, Tehsil or Union councils. There have been multiple accusations of Pakistan's military establishment rigging the election in favor of General Ayub Khan.

There were two major parties contesting the elections: the Convention Muslim League and the Combined Opposition Parties. The Combined Opposition Parties consisted of five major opposition parties, and had a nine-point program, which included the restoration of parliamentary democracy and introduction of direct elections and adult franchise. The Combined Opposition Parties had no single leadership and were therefore, unable to select a presidential candidate from amongst themselves. Hence, they chose Fatima Jinnah as their candidate who was seen as an undisputed leader due to her relationship with Muhammad Ali Jinnah. Meanwhile, the candidate for Convention Muslim League was the incumbent President Mohammed Ayub Khan.

== Election campaign ==
There were four candidates: General Ayub Khan, Fatima Jinnah and two independent candidates, K.M. Kamal and Mian Bashir Ahmed. There was a short campaigning period of one month, which was further restricted to nine projection meetings that were organized by the Election Commission and were attended only by the members of the Electoral College and members of the press. The public was barred from attending the projection meetings, which would have enhanced Fatima Jinnah's image.

=== Ayub Khan ===
Since then, he had been serving as a president. He consolidated his position as a Constitutional ruler by drafting the 1962 constitution. At the time the elections were held, Ayub had introduced a number of Economic reforms that had increased the growth rate of the country and had also pulled it out of the severe economic crisis that had begun after the assassination of Liaquat Ali Khan in 1951. This made Ayub a popular ruler. Moreover, being the Commander in Chief of Army, he took several steps to turn the odds in his favour. He didn't even hesitate to legislate on electoral matters, giving him an edge over rival candidate, Fatima Jinnah.

=== Fatima Jinnah ===
The campaign of Fatima Jinnah suffered from a number of setbacks. An unfair and unequal election campaign, poor finances, and indirect elections through the Basic Democracy System were some of the primary problems she faced. However, she had overwhelming support among the public. Many had sympathies with her as she was the sister of Muhammad Ali Jinnah, whilst others saw her as an excellent figure to challenge Ayub Khan's Military Dictatorship. Although many clerics had denounced her with the view that a woman cannot lead a Muslim state, several religious leaders also supported her. The Jamaat-e-Islami led by Maududi, was a keen supporter of Ms. Jinnah's campaign as she was a conservative motivated by religious views, as compared to secular Ayub Khan.

== Results and aftermath ==
The election results came in favour of the incumbent President Ayub Khan, who, despite losing the popular vote, won 62.43% of the Electoral vote. Fatima Jinnah won 35.86% of the electoral college votes. Jinnah was however extremely successful in some areas of the country. She had swept across major urban centres such as Karachi and Dhaka. Ayub also faced disappointing results in East Pakistan. However, Ayub had decisively triumphed in rural Pakistan except a few centers including Nawabshah where Hakim Ali Zardari, the father of Asif Ali Zardari (who later served as the President of Pakistan twice), as the district mayor of Nawabshah supported Ms. Jinnah against Ayub. As majority of the Electoral College consisted of representatives from the rural setup, Ayub was able to win a clear majority.

The election results were not accepted by the Combined Opposition Parties, who accused Ayub Khan of rigging. The COP staged demonstrations and protests, however, didn't gain much public support as Jinnah, accepted the election results. The Election had an effective result. It further strengthened the role of Women in politics in Pakistan. Earlier there were only a handful of women politicians, however since this election women began to enter politics in large numbers and even started to contest for higher posts.

== See also ==
- Muhammad Munir
- Awami League
- 1953 Pakistani constitutional coup
- National Awami Party
