= Quaid-i-Azam Academy =

Institution of Pakistan Government

The Quaid-i-Azam Academy (Urdu: اکادمیِ قائدِ اعظم) is an institution of the Pakistan Government to promote the study and understanding of the personality and work of Quaid-i-Azam Muhammad Ali Jinnah, his associates, the Pakistan Movement and of the various aspects of Pakistan.

== History ==
It was established on the occasion of the 100th birth anniversary of Quaid-i-Azam Mohammad Ali Jinnah in 1976, by a resolution of the Government of Pakistan, as an autonomous body.

== Administration ==
The academy is headed by a chairman and works as a component organization of Ministry of Culture, Sports & Youth Affairs, Government of Pakistan. The president of Pakistan is the patron, and the prime minister of Pakistan is the president, whereas the federal minister of culture is the vice president, and the federal secretary of culture is the executive head of the academy.

The academy has a board of governors and an executive committee empowered to take decisions for its smooth functioning. It has a full-time director research, who is also the administrative head of the academy.

Pakistan ki Jadd-o-Juhd-i-Azadi was organized by the institution on Aug 20, 2011.

== Quaid-i-Azam Papers ==
The Government of Pakistan had established Quaid-i-Azam Papers Project in 1990 to edit and publish Papers of Quaid-i-Azam Mohammad Ali Jinnah called Quaid-i-Azam Papers. Dr. Zawwar Hussain Zaidi formerly at the School of Oriental and African Studies University of London was appointed as Editor-in-Chief of the Project. A portion in the National Achieves building at Islamabad was given to this project for its office where the project was established. This project was later merged in to Quaid-i-Azam Academy, Karachi in 2001. It is working as Quaid-i-Azam Papers Wing in the same building, at Islamabad. The term of Dr. Zawwar Hussain Zaidi as Editor-in-Chief of the project was expired on 31 December 2008. Mr. M. Akram Shaheedi is Editor-in-Chief, Quaid-i-Azam Papers Wing Islamabad since 12-May 2009. Till to date 16 volumes of Quaid-i-Azam Papers entitled Jinnah Papers have been published in English language covering the period from 1 January 1940 to 30 September 1948. Urdu translation of some of these volumes are published in 7 volumes.
