= Basic democracy =

Governance system implemented in Pakistan in 1959

Basic democracy was a government system implemented in Pakistan by the Ayub Khan government in 1959 when the Basic Democracies Order was promulgated.

== Background ==
In 1958, Ayub Khan assumed power in Pakistan, asserting that Western-style constitutions were unsuitable for developing countries. He banned political parties, blaming them for political instability, and introduced a system of basic democracy in 1960 to balance authoritarian rule with democratic principles.

The basic democracy system had elements of existing local governance structures such as traditional village councils, known as panchayats in Punjab and union boards in Bengal, which were initially referred to as union panchayats by Ayub Khan in September 1959. The term was later changed to 'union councils' during the Governors' Conference in Dhaka on September 2, 1959, and subsequently used in the Basic Democracies Law.

== Basic democracy system ==
Organized into five hierarchical tiers, the system commenced with union councils in rural areas and town committees in urban areas, followed by thana councils in East Pakistan and tehsil councils in West Pakistan, then district councils, divisional councils, and concluded with provincial development advisory councils.

=== Union council ===
The foundational unit, the union council, typically included a chairman and around 15 members, with two-thirds elected and one-third nominated by the government, a practice abolished in 1962.

=== Tehsil council ===
The thana or tehsil councils represented the second tier and were composed of chairmen from lower councils, official members from various departments, and were chaired by the Sub-Divisional Officer or a tehsildar in West Pakistan.

=== District council ===
The district councils, forming the third tier, consisted of up to 40 members, including the chairmen of the thana councils and other officials, with the district magistrate serving as chairman.

=== Divisional council ===
The divisional councils, forming the fourth tier, functioned primarily as advisory bodies, led by the Divisional Commissioner and including members from the district councils and government departments.

=== Provincial development advisory council ===
The provincial development advisory councils, which were similar in composition to the divisional councils, were eventually replaced by provincial assemblies.
