= Mohammad Sanaullah =

Bangladeshi politician

- মোহাম্মদ সানাউল্লাহ

Member of Parliament from Undivided Dhaka-22 (Present Gazipur-4)
- In office 1979–1982
- Preceded by: Tajuddin Ahmad
- Succeeded by: Mohammad Shahidullah

Personal details
- Died: 26 June 2017
- Party: Bangladesh Nationalist Party

Mohammad Sanaullah (died 26 June 2017) was a Bangladesh Nationalist Party politician and physician. He was elected a member of parliament from undivided Dhaka-22 (present Gazipur-4) in the 1979 Bangladeshi general election.

== Early life ==
Mohammad Sanaullah was born into a Bengali Muslim family in Kapasia, Gazipur District.

== Career ==
Mohammad Sanaullah was a doctor. He was elected a member of parliament from undivided Dhaka-22 (present Gazipur-4) in the 1979 Bangladeshi general election.
