= Second Monem ministry =

Twelfth cabinet of East-Pakistan

Second Ministry of Abdul Monem Khan
- 12th Cabinet of East Pakistan
- 1965–1969
- Date formed: 29 March 1965
- Date dissolved: 23 March 1969

People and organisations
- Governor: Abdul Monem Khan
- No. of ministers: 11
- Ministers removed: 2
- Total no. of members: 13
- Member party: PMLC
- Status in legislature: Majority 82 / 155 (53%)
- Opposition party: COP
- Opposition leader: Abdul Malek Ukil; Asaduzzaman Khan

History
- Election: 1965
- Outgoing election: 1962
- Legislature term: 4th East Pakistan Provincial Assembly
- Predecessor: Monem I
- Successor: Malik

The Second Monem ministry was the twelfth cabinet formed in East Pakistan, the former eastern administrative division of Pakistan. It was constituted under the leadership of Abdul Monem Khan, the governor of East Pakistan, prior to the 1965 East Pakistan Provincial Assembly elections. It remained in office for nearly four years.

== Background ==
After winning the 1965 presidential election, Ayub Khan became the president of Pakistan for a second term. On the same year's Republic Day, Khan took oath as president and Abdul Monem Khan as governor of East Pakistan at the federal capital, Islamabad. After being appointed provincial governor for a second time, Monem returned to the province and announced that a new cabinet would be formed by 18 March. The governor stated that it would be a preliminary cabinet, which would later be converted into a full cabinet after the completion of the forthcoming provincial elections. On 29 March 1965, a five-member provincial cabinet was sworn in under the leadership of governor Monem. After the session of the East Pakistan Provincial Assembly concluded in 21 June, it was announced that the number of cabinet members would be increased to ten. In 15 August, three additional members were inducted into the cabinet. In 13 November, two new members joined the cabinet.

== Fall ==
During the 1969 Mass Uprising, Mirza Nurul Huda assumed office as the new provincial governor on 23 March 1969. However, the following day president Khan resigned, and Yahya Khan assumed state power and imposed martial law. He pledged to frame a new constitution and form a new government through elections based on adult franchise.

== Members ==
The cabinet consisted of the following ministers:

Cabinet members
Portfolio	Minister	Took office	Left office
Home, General Administration, Services and Planning Department	Abdul Monem Khan	29 March 1965	23 March 1969
Finance Department	Mirza Nurul Huda	29 March 1965	23 March 1969
Revenue Department	Fakhruddin Ahmed		23 March 1969
Commerce and Industry Department	Dewan Abdul Basith	29 March 1965	23 March 1969
Health, Labour and Social Welfare Department	Fazlul Bari		23 March 1969
Roads, Water and Rail Department	Sultan Ahmed	15 August 1965	23 March 1969
Law and Parliamentary Affairs Department	Fakir Abdul Mannan		23 March 1969
Education Department	S. M. Amzad Hossain	13 November 1965	23 March 1969
Agriculture, Food and Cooperatives Department	Q. M. Rahman		23 March 1969
Forests, Public Works, Power and Irrigation Department	Maung Shwe Prue Chowdhury		23 March 1969

== Former members and their portfolios ==
The former members and their respective portfolios were as follows:

Cabinet members
Portfolio	Minister	Took office	Left office
Revenue and Civil Aid and Rehabilitation Department	Fazlul Bari	29 March 1965	Unknown
Health, Labour and Social Welfare Department	Sultan Ahmed	29 March 1965	9 June 1965
Health, Labour and Social Welfare Department	Maung Shwe Prue Chowdhury	15 August 1965	Unknown
Agriculture, Food and Cooperatives Department	Kazi Abdul Kader	29 March 1965	Unknown
Agriculture, Food and Cooperatives Department	Fakir Abdul Mannan	13 November 1965	Unknown
Civil Aid and Rehabilitation Department	Fakir Abdul Mannan		Unknown
Law and Parliamentary Affairs Department	Abdul Hye Choudhury	15 August 1965	19 October 1968
