= Salahuddin Aiyubi =

Bangladeshi politician

- সালাহউদ্দিন আইয়ুবী

Member of the Bangladesh Parliament for Gazipur-4
- Incumbent
- Assumed office 17 February 2026
- Preceded by: Simeen Hussain Rimi

Personal details
- Born: Kapasia Upazila, Gazipur District, Bangladesh
- Party: Bangladesh Jamaat-e-Islami
- Education: National University
- Occupation: Politician, teacher
- Website: salahuddinayubi.net

Salahuddin Aiyubi is a Bangladeshi politician with the Bangladesh Jamaat-e-Islami. He was elected as the Member of Parliament for the Gazipur-4 constituency in the 2026 Bangladeshi general election held on 12 February 2026. He is former central president of Bangladesh Islami Chhatra Shibir.

== Early life and education ==
Salahuddin Ayubi was born in Belasi, Rayed Union, Gazipur District. He received higher education in both general education and madrasa education. He obtained his honours degree in English language and literature from Dhaka College. He also obtained his LLB degree from the National University. In madrasa education, he completed his Dakhil from Raed Darus Sunnah Dakhil Madrasa, then completed his Alim from Mohakhali Darul Uloom Hossainia Kamil Madrasa. He obtained his Kamil degree from Dhaka Alia Madrasa.
