= Fakir Abdul Mannan =

- ফকির আবদুল মান্নান

Provincial Minister of East Pakistan
- In office 1968–1969
- Ministry: Law and Parliamentary Affairs
- Preceded by: Abdul Hye Choudhury
- Succeeded by: Jasimuddin Ahmad
- In office 1966–1969
- Ministry: Relief and Rehabilitation
- Preceded by: Fazlul Bari
- Succeeded by: Shamsul Huq
- In office 1965–1966
- Ministry: Food and Agriculture
- Preceded by: Kazi Abdul Kader
- Succeeded by: Q. M. Rahman

Personal details
- Born: 1901 Ghagatia, Bengal Presidency, British India
- Died: 31 October 1993 (aged 91–92) Tejgaon, Dhaka, Bangladesh
- Party: PMLC
- Other political affiliations: PML (1947–1958); AIML (1943–1947); KPP (1936–1943)
- Relations: Faqir Majnu Shah (great-grandfather); Faqueer Shahabuddin Ahmad (nephew)
- Children: Hannan; Nayeem

Fakir Abdul Mannan was a Bangladeshi lawyer and politician who served as the general-secretary of the East Pakistan Muslim League (EPML) and later as the president of East Pakistan branch of the Convention Muslim League (PMLC). He served as a provincial minister in several ministries of East Pakistan from 1965 to 1969.

== Birth and early life ==
Fakir Abdul Mannan was born in 1901 in Ghagotia, Kapasia Thana, Dacca district, Eastern Bengal and Assam, British India (located in the present-day Gazipur District, Bangladesh). Mannan was a descendant of Faqir Majnu Shah, one of the leaders of the Faqir revolt. Mannan's father Fakir Abdul Wahab was a taluqdar. Mannan's brother's name was Fakir Giasuddin Ahmed. Before 1935, Mannan obtained a bachelor degree in law.

== Career ==
In 1935, Mannan began practicing law in Dacca. In 1946, he was elected as a member of the Bengal Legislative Assembly. After the creation of Pakistan following the partition of India in 1947, he became a member of the East Bengal Legislative Assembly, one of the successors of the Bengal Legislative Assembly, until 1953. From 1952, he served for two years as the general-secretary of the East Pakistan Muslim League (EPML) and as secretary of the EPML's parliamentary party in the East Bengal Legislative Assembly. From the same year until 1959, he served as chairman of the Dacca District Board, and the following year he was a member of the Dacca Divisional Council. In the 1954 East Bengal Legislative Assembly election, he contested from his constituency and was defeated by Tajuddin Ahmad, candidate of United Front (UF). Alongside working as a lawyer at the Supreme Court of Pakistan and the East Pakistan High Court, Mannam also served as counsel of the government of East Pakistan and legal adviser for the University of Dacca and Textile Directorate of East Pakistan. On 13 November 1965, he was appointed Provincial Minister for Food and Agriculture of East Pakistan. On 1 November 1966, he was made Provincial Minister for Relief and Rehabilitation. Around the same time, the executive committee of the East Pakistan branch of the Convention Muslim League (PMLC) was dissolved and an ad hoc organizational committee was formed with Mannan as its chairman. He was later elected president of the East Pakistan PMLC's newly formed executive committee. In 1968, after Abdul Hye Choudhury resigned, Mannan became acting Provincial Minister for Law.

== Family life ==
Mannan had three sons and two daughters. His eldest son Hannan Shah was a retired officer of the Bangladesh Army and a politician. His second son, Shah Abu Nayeem Mominur Rahman, was a judge of the Appellate Division of the Supreme Court of Bangladesh. Mubarak Shah, Mannan's youngest son, worked for the financial services company American Express in the United States. Mannan's eldest daughter, Anwara Idris, was a lawyer of the Supreme Court of Bangladesh and the maternal aunt of Bangladeshi president Zillur Rahman. His youngest daughter, Anjuman Ara Begum Minu, was the director of the icddr,b, and currently resides in the United States. Faqueer Shahabuddin Ahmad, the first Attorney General of Bangladesh, was Mannan's paternal nephew.

== Death and legacy ==
Mannan died on 31 October 1993 at his residence on Kazi Nazrul Islam Avenue in Dhaka due to old age. The Fakir Abdul Mannan Memorial Gold Medal and a monthly scholarship from the Fakir Abdul Mannan and Wazeda Akhter Memorial Trust Fund are awarded to the students who obtain the highest grade in the postgraduate examination in law at the University of Dhaka.
