= Mohammad Obaid Ullah =

Bangladeshi politician

Member of Bangladesh Parliament
- In office 1988–1991
- Preceded by: Mohammad Shahidullah
- Succeeded by: ASM Hannan Shah

Personal details
- Party: Bangladesh Nationalist Party

Mohammad Obaid Ullah is a Bangladesh Nationalist Party politician and a former member of parliament for Gazipur-4.

== Early life ==
Obaid Ullah was born into a Bengali Muslim family in Kapasia, Gazipur District.

== Career ==
Obaid Ullah was elected to parliament from Gazipur-4 as a Bangladesh Nationalist Party candidate in 1988.
