= S. M. Amzad Hossain =

Bangladeshi lawyer and politician (1927–2013)

Provincial Minister of Education of East Pakistan
- In office 1965–1969
- Governor: Abdul Monem Khan
- Preceded by: Mafizuddin Ahmad
- Succeeded by: Abbas Ali Khan

Personal details
- Born: 1927 Deyara, Khulna District, Bengal Presidency, British India
- Died: 23 October 2013 (aged 85–86) Mohammadpur, Dhaka, Bangladesh
- Party: PMLC
- Other political affiliations: PML (1947–1962); AIML (pre-1947)
- Relations: Abul Hussain (brother); Muhammad Nurul Huda (nephew)
- Education: Bachelor of Laws
- Alma mater: University of Dhaka
- Occupation: Lawyer; academic

S. M. Amzad Hossain (1927 – 23 October 2013) was a Bangladeshi lawyer, academic, and politician. He served as a member of the East Pakistan Provincial Assembly from 1962 and as Provincial Minister of Education of East Pakistan from 1965 to 1969, serving in the Second Monem ministry under Governor Abdul Monem Khan. After the independence of Bangladesh, he served as president of the Bangladesh Muslim League.

== Early life ==
Hossain was born in 1927 in Deyara village of Khulna District in the Bengal Presidency of British India (now part of Rupsa Upazila, Khulna District, Bangladesh). During his student years, he was a member of the Bengal Provincial Muslim Students League. He completed his secondary education from B. K. Union Institution in 1944 and graduated from Brajalal College in 1947. In the same year, he became president of the Khulna Muslim Students League, a position he held for four years. He also served as joint secretary of the East Pakistan Provincial Muslim League. In 1948, he joined Tamaddun Majlish as a founding member. He participated in the Bengali Language Movement. After obtaining a law degree from the University of Dhaka, he joined the legal profession at the Khulna Court in 1952 and passed the Bar Council examination two years later.

== Career ==
In 1953, Hossain was appointed as an honorary professor at Azam Khan Government Commerce College, remaining in the position until 1961. Simultaneously, he served as a member of the governing body of Daulatpur College in Khulna. During this period, he was elected commissioner of Jahanabad Union in 1957. In 1962, he was elected a member of the East Pakistan Provincial Assembly. Three years later, he was appointed Provincial Minister of Education of East Pakistan as a member of the Second Monem ministry. He held this position until 1969. Following the independence of Bangladesh, he served as president of the Bangladesh Muslim League.

== Later life ==
In 1980, Hossain joined Khulna City Law College as a senior professor. In 2005, the UNESCO Club of Bangladesh awarded him a lifetime honour for contributions to education.

Hossain's father, S. M. Ismail Hossain, was a police officer killed by the Pakistan Army during the Bangladesh Liberation War in 1971. His elder brother, Abul Hussain, was a poet who died in 2014. His nephew, Muhammad Nurul Huda, served as Bangladesh's Inspector General of Police.

== Death ==
Hossain died on 23 October 2013 in Mohammadpur, Dhaka, while receiving treatment at CARe Hospital for age-related complications. Following his death, a condolence motion was raised in a session of the 10th Jatiya Sangsad.

== Personal life ==
Hossain was married and had four sons and four daughters. His wife died in 2008.
