= Shahidul Islam (judge) =

Bangladeshi judge

Justice of the High Court Division of Bangladesh

Personal details
- Profession: Judge

Shahidul Islam is a judge of the High Court Division of Bangladesh Supreme Court.

== Career ==
Shahidul Islam and Justice Shah Abu Nayeem Mominur Rahman stopped an extortion case, filed by Azam J. Chowdhury, against former Prime Minister Sheikh Hasina in 2008 under Emergency Power Rules. Following the verdict the two judges bench was transferred from the writ to civil appeal hearings. The High Court Bench had ruled that it had the authority to provide bails to those convicted under the Emergency Power Rules but that was later squashed by the Appellate Division.

In February 2016, Eunus Ali Akond filed a petition with the Appellate Division seeking a verdict preventing retired High Court judges from practicing as lawyers and mentioned Justice Nozrul Islam Chowdhury and Shahidul Islam.
