= Afsaruddin Ahmad =

Bangladeshi politician (1940–2021)

Afsaruddin Ahmad Khan
- আফসার উদ্দিন আহমেদ খাঁন

State Minister of Housing and Public Works
- In office 1996–1997

Member of Parliament for Gazipur-4
- In office 14 July 1996 – 13 July 2001
- Preceded by: ASM Hannan Shah
- Succeeded by: Sohel Taj

Personal details
- Born: 1940
- Died: 17 November 2021 (aged 81) Lokkhi Bazar, Dhaka
- Party: Bangladesh Awami League
- Relations: Tajuddin Ahmad (brother)
- Relatives: Sohel Taj (nephew); Simeen Hussain Rimi (niece); Syeda Zohra (sister-in-law)

Afsaruddin Ahmad Khan (1940 – 17 November 2021) was a Bangladesh Awami League politician. He served as a Jatiya Sangsad member representing the Gazipur-4 constituency during 1996–2001 and the state minister for housing and public works during 1996–1997. He was the younger brother of Tajuddin Ahmad, the inaugural Prime Minister of Bangladesh.

== Early life and family ==
Khan was born to Maulavi Muhammad Yasin Khan and Meherunnesa Khanam. He had two brothers and six sisters.

== Career ==
Khan was elected to parliament in 1996 from Gazipur-4. He served as the State Minister for public works in the First Sheikh Hasina Cabinet from 1996 to 1997. In 2012, by-elections were called in Gazipur-4, after Sohel Taj resigned. He contested the 2012 by polls in Gazipur-4 as an independent candidate. He lost the election to Simin Hossain Rimi, the Bangladesh Awami League candidate.

== Personal life ==
Khan was the younger brother of Tajuddin Ahmad, former Prime Minister of Bangladesh. Tajuddin's son, Sohel Taj, was elected to represent the same constituency, Gazipur-4, in 2001 and 2008. After Sohel's resignation, by-election was held in 2021 and Khan participated as an independent candidate. But he lost the election to Simin Hossain Rimi, a sister of Sohel.
