= Mohammad Shahidullah (Gazipur politician) =

Bangladeshi politician

Member of Bangladesh Parliament
- In office 1986–1988
- Preceded by: Mohammad Sanaullah
- Succeeded by: Mohammad Obaid Ullah

Personal details
- Party: Jatiya Party (Ershad)

Mohammad Shahidullah is a Jatiya Party (Ershad) politician and a former member of parliament for Gazipur-4.

== Career ==
Shahidullah was elected to parliament from Gazipur-4 as a Jatiya Party candidate in 1986.
