= Dewan Abdul Basith =

Bangladeshi lawyer

Dewan Abdul Basith Choudhury (Bengali: দেওয়ান আবদুল বাছিত চৌধুরী) was a Bangladeshi lawyer, who was legislative leader of the East Pakistan Provincial Assembly and provincial minister of East Pakistan.

== Biography ==
Basith was born on 11 October 1911 in Sylhet District of the Eastern Bengal and Assam, British India, into the family of politician Khan Bahadur Dewan Abdul Hamid Choudhury. After completing his undergraduate studies at the University of Calcutta in 1936, he studied law at the University of Dhaka. In 1937, he was made a member of the South Sylhet Local Board of the Assam Provincial Muslim League (APML), a position he held until 1944. In 1938, he became the organizing secretary of the All India Muslim Students Federation. In his early life, he was active as a member of the APML and led the Moulvibazar Subdivisional Muslim League. In 1940, he was appointed an honorary magistrate by the Assamese government. Three years later, he became the assistant secretary of the APML. The following year, he was elected general secretary of the APML and a councillor of the All-India Muslim League (AIML). He was also elected a member of the Central Legislative Assembly the same year as a party nominee. In 1946, he became a member of the Assam Legislative Assembly. In 1947, during the Sylhet referendum, he served as chairman of the subdivisional referendum committee.

In the same year, after the independence of Pakistan, he became a member of the East Bengal Legislative Assembly. During this period, he also served as a member of the working committee of the East Pakistan Provincial Muslim League (EPPML) and as a councillor of the Pakistan Muslim League (PML). In 1950, when Muslim refugees from the Indian states of Tripura and Assam took shelter in the Pakistani province of East Bengal, the EPPML formed a relief committee, of which he was the chairman. His tenure as a member of the legislative assembly ended before the 1954 provincial election. In 1965, he was nominated as a member of the central parliamentary board of the Convention Muslim League (PMLC). In the same year, he was appointed Minister of Commerce and Industry of East Pakistan as a member of the Second Monem ministry. He was also made the leader of the East Pakistan Provincial Assembly. In 1971, during the Bangladesh Liberation War, he joined the pro-Pakistani organization East Pakistan Central Peace Committee. Basith died in 1988. His younger son, Dewan Shamim Afzal Chowdhury, is an independent politician.
