= Hannan Shah =

Bangladeshi politician and general

Hannan Shahhh
- হান্নান শাহ

Minister of Jute
- In office 20 March 1991 – January 1996

Member of Parliament for Gazipur-4
- In office 20 March 1993 – March 1996
- Preceded by: Mohammad Obaid Ullah
- Succeeded by: Afsaruddin Ahmad

Personal details
- Born: 11 October 1941 Kapasia, Bengal, British India
- Died: 27 September 2016 (aged 74) Raffles Hospital, Singapore
- Party: Bangladesh Nationalist Party
- Spouse: Nahid Hannan
- Children: Reazul Hannan
- Parent: Fakir Abdul Mannan (father)
- Occupation: politician

Military service
- Allegiance: Pakistan (before 1971); Bangladesh
- Branch/service: Pakistan Army; Bangladesh Army
- Years of service: 1961-1981
- Rank: Brigadier General
- Unit: Armoured Corps
- Commands: Commandant of Armoured Corps Centre and School
- Battles/wars: Bangladesh Liberation War

Abu Sayed Matiul Hannan Shah (known as Hannan Shah; 11 October 1941 – 27 September 2016) was a Bangladeshi politician and army officer from Gazipur District. He served as the jute minister and a Jatiya Sangsad member representing the Gazipur-4 constituency during 1991–1996.

== Early life ==
Shah was born in Ghagtia, Kapasia, Gazipur District in British India. His father, Fakir Abdul Mannan, was a minister in the Pakistan government during 1965–1968. In 1962, Hannan Shah was commissioned in the Pakistan Army. Shah's younger brother, Shah Abu Nayeem Mominur Rahman, was a judge in the Supreme Court's Appellate Division.

== Career ==
Shah retired from the Bangladesh Army as a brigadier general in 1982. He joined the Bangladesh Nationalist Party in 1984. He served as the standing committee member of the Bangladesh Nationalist Party. Shah served as the Minister of Jute during 1991–96.

On 25 November 2013, Shah was arrested by the Bangladesh Police at his residence.

== Personal life and death ==
Shah was married to Nahid Hannan. Together they had one daughter, Sharmin Hannan, and two sons, Shah Rezaul Hannan and Shah Reazul Hannan.

In January 2015, Shah was hospitalized at the Combined Military Hospital in Dhaka with respiratory problems. He died at the age of 74 in Singapore while undergoing treatment for heart disease on 27 September 2016.
