= Gazipur-4 =

Constituency of Bangladesh's Jatiya Sangsad

Coordinates: 24.11°N 90.57°E

- Constituency for the Jatiya Sangsad
- District: Gazipur District
- Division: Dhaka Division
- Electorate: 330,977 (2026)

Current constituency
- Created: 1984
- Party: Bangladesh Jamaat-e-Islami
- Member: Salahuddin Aiyubi
- ← 196 Gazipur-3 198 Gazipur-5 →

Gazipur-4 is a constituency represented in the Jatiya Sangsad (National Parliament) of Bangladesh since 2026 by Salahuddin Aiyubi of the Bangladesh Jamaat-e-Islami.

== Boundaries ==
The constituency encompasses Kapasia Upazila.

== History ==
The constituency was created in 1984 from a Dhaka constituency when the former Dhaka District was split into six districts: Manikganj, Munshiganj, Dhaka, Gazipur, Narsingdi, and Narayanganj.

Ahead of the 2008 general election, the Election Commission redrew constituency boundaries to reflect population changes revealed by the 2001 Bangladesh census. The 2008 redistricting added a fifth seat to Gazipur District and altered the boundaries of Gazipur-4.

== Members of Parliament ==
Election	Member	Party
1986	Mohammad Shahidullah	Jatiya Party
1988	Mohammad Obaid Ullah	Independent
1991	ASM Hannan Shah	Bangladesh Nationalist Party
Jun 1996	Afsaruddin Ahmad	Awami League
2001	Tanjim Ahmed Sohel Taj	Awami League
2008	Tanjim Ahmed Sohel Taj	Awami League
2012 by-election	Simeen Hussain Rimi	Awami League
2014	Simeen Hussain Rimi	Awami League
2018	Simeen Hussain Rimi	Awami League
2024	Simeen Hussain Rimi	Awami League
2026	Salahuddin Aiyubi	Bangladesh Jamaat-e-Islami

== Elections ==
=== Elections in the 2020s ===
General election 2026: Gazipur-4
Party	Candidate	Votes	%	±%
Jamaat	Salahuddin Aiyubi	96,911		
BNP	Shah Riyajul Hannan	87,505		
IAB	Md. Kazim Uddin			
JP(E)	Enamul Kabir			
Majority		9,406		
Turnout				
Registered electors		330,977		
Jamaat gain from AL				

=== Elections in the 2010s ===
General Election 2014: Gazipur-4
Party	Candidate	Votes	%	±%
AL	Simeen Hussain Rimi	112,887	92.3	+22.8
JP(E)	MM Anowar Hossain	7,833	6.4	N/A
BNF	Mohammad Saruyare Kaynat	1,626	1.3	N/A
Majority		105,054	85.9	+45.3
Turnout		122,346	53.3	+10.0
AL hold				

Tanjim Ahmad Sohel Taj submitted a letter of resignation from parliament on 23 April 2012. On procedural grounds it was not accepted, but when he again tendered his resignation on 7 July 2012, the seat was declared vacant. Simeen Hussain Rimi, his sister, was elected in a September 2012 by-election.

Gazipur-4 by-election, 2012
Party	Candidate	Votes	%	±%
AL	Simeen Hussain Rimi	63,401	69.5	+7.2
Independent	Afsaruddin Ahmad	26,349	28.9	N/A
CPB	Asadullah Badal	1,428	1.6	N/A
Majority		37,052	40.6	+14.6
Turnout		91,178	43.3	−44.5
AL hold				

=== Elections in the 2000s ===
General Election 2008: Gazipur-4
Party	Candidate	Votes	%	±%
AL	Tanjim Ahmad Sohel Taj	110,682	62.3	+11.1
BNP	Mohammad Abdul Majid	64,466	36.3	−9.5
IAB	Azahar Hossain Khan	1,191	0.7	N/A
Independent	Mahmudul Alam Khan	933	0.5	+0.5
Independent	Farida Yasmin	208	0.1	N/A
National People's Party	Md. Asraf Hossain Sarkar	82	0.0	N/A
Majority		46,216	26.0	+20.5
Turnout		177,562	87.8	+8.3
AL hold				

General Election 2001: Gazipur-4
Party	Candidate	Votes	%	±%
AL	Tanjim Ahmad Sohel Taj	80,675	51.2	+3.2
BNP	ASM Hannan Shah	72,082	45.8	+3.6
Independent	Fakir Iskander Alam	3,238	2.1	N/A
IJOF	Mostafizur Rahman	1,322	0.8	N/A
Independent	Md. Abdul Mazid	136	0.1	N/A
Independent	Mahmudul Alam Khan	55	0.0	N/A
Majority		8,593	5.5	−0.3
Turnout		157,508	79.5	+0.6
AL hold				

=== Elections in the 1990s ===
General Election June 1996: Gazipur-4
Party	Candidate	Votes	%	±%
AL	Afsaruddin Ahmad	56,504	48.0	+6.7
BNP	ASM Hannan Shah	49,627	42.2	−2.4
JP(E)	Md. Abdul Majid	5,838	5.0	+3.9
Jamaat	A. K. M. Abdur Rashid	3,486	3.0	−1.3
IOJ	Md. Faiz Uddin	1,178	1.0	N/A
Zaker Party	Abdul Kabir	546	0.5	−7.7
CPB	Md. Altaf Hossain	175	0.2	0.0
Independent	Mahabubur Rahman	133	0.1	N/A
Bangladesh Islami Party	Md. Nazim Uddin Sheikh	132	0.1	N/A
Independent	Md. Abdul Qasem	90	0.1	N/A
Independent	Shihab Uddin Mahmud	40	0.0	N/A
Majority		6,877	5.8	+2.4
Turnout		117,749	78.9	+19.0
AL hold				

General Election 1991: Gazipur-4
Party	Candidate	Votes	%	±%
BNP	ASM Hannan Shah	46,766	44.6	
AL	Syeda Zohra Tajuddin	43,255	41.3	
Zaker Party	Abdul Kabir	8,549	8.2	
Jamaat	A. Rashid	4,532	4.3	
JP(E)	Mostafizur Rahman	1,107	1.1	
Independent	Moazzem Hossain	339	0.3	
CPB	Md. Shahidullah	216	0.2	
Majority		3,511	3.4	
Turnout		104,764	59.9	
BNP hold				
