= Shah Abu Nayeem Mominur Rahman =

Bangladeshi Judge

- শাহ আবু নাঈম মমিনুর রহমান
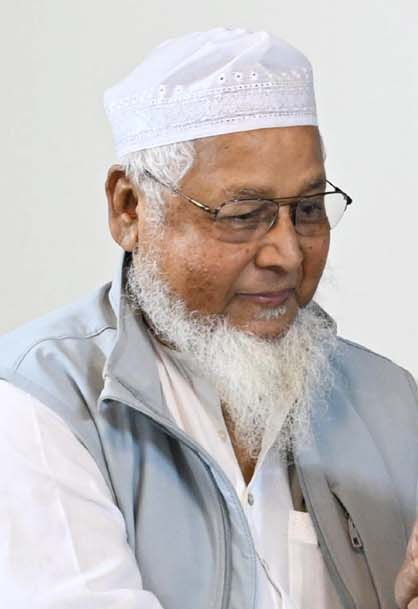
- Shah in 2025

Justice of the High Court and Appellate Division of Bangladesh Supreme Court

Personal details
- Relations: Hannan Shah (brother)
- Parent: Fakir Abdul Mannan (father)
- Education: University of Dhaka
- Profession: Judge

Shah Abu Nayeem Mominur Rahman was a justice on the Appellate Division of Bangladesh Supreme Court. He resigned from the Supreme Court after being twice passed over from promotion.

== Early life ==
Mominur Rahman completed his undergraduate and graduate studies in physics in 1965 and 1966 respectively. He completed his law degree in 1970 from the University of Dhaka.

== Career ==
In 1972, Mominur Rahman started with law practice at the Dhaka District Judge's Court.

Mominur Rahman became a lawyer of the High Court Division in 1974.

In 1980, Mominur Rahman became a lawyer of the Appellate Division of Bangladesh Supreme Court.

Mominur Rahman was appointed a Judge of the High Court of Bangladesh in 1996.

In October 2007, Mominur Rahman and Justice Zubayer Rahman Chowdhury issued bail orders for Prime Minister Khaleda Zia. On 22 November 2007, Mominur Rahman and Justice Zubayer Rahman Chowdhury declared seeking the wealth statement of Prime Minister Sheikh Hasina by the Anti Corruption Commission to be illegal.

On 27 January 2008, Mominur Rahman and Justice Shahidul Islam issued an order asking the Caretaker Government why it should be directed to hold the stalled national elections. In February 2008, he and Justice Shahidul Islam, declared the proceedings of the case filled by Azam J Chowdhury against Prime Minister Sheikh Hasina illegal. On 17 March 2008, the chief justice stripped him of judicial powers.

In 2009, Mominur Rahman was made a judge in the Appellate Division of Bangladesh Supreme Court.

In 2010, Justice A. B. M. Khairul Haque was appointed Chief Justice of Bangladesh despite Mominur Rahman being the most senior judge in the Appellate Division and next in line to become the Chief Justice.

Mominur Rahman was the senior most judge on the justice on the Appellate Division of Bangladesh Supreme Court and was next in line to become the 20th Chief Justice of Bangladesh in 2011. Rather than appoint him Chief Justice, the government of Bangladesh appointed Md. Muzammel Hossain. Mominur Rahman is the younger brother of Bangladesh Nationalist Party politician Hannan Shah and his promotion was twice ignored by the Awami League government. He resigned from the Supreme Court after being ignored for the a promotion for the second time.

In 2025, he served as the head of judiciary reform commission.
