= Barishab Union =

Barishab Union বারিষাব
- Union
- Location in Bangladesh
- Coordinates: 24°6′N 90°34.2′E
- Country: Bangladesh
- Division: Dhaka Division
- District: Gazipur District

Government

Area
  - Total: 3,900 km^{2} (1,500 sq mi)

Population (2011)
  - Total: 60,139
  - Density: 1,500/km^{2} (3,900/sq mi)
- Time zone: UTC+6 (BST)
- 1730: 1743
- Website: barishabaup.gazipur.gov.bd

Barishab (Bengali: বারিষাব) is a Union of Kapasia Upazila of Gazipur District in the Division of Dhaka, Bangladesh. Barishab is located at 24.1880°N 90.6437°E. Barishab is a part of the old Bhawal Estate and falls within its boundary.
