= Simeen Hussain Rimi =

Bangladeshi Politician and Member of Parliament

- সিমিন হোসেন রিমি
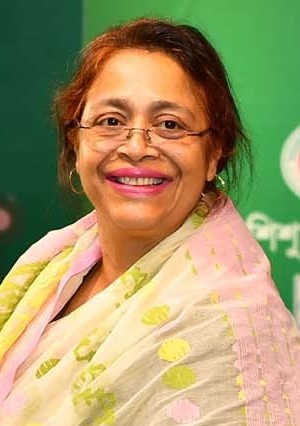
- Rimi in 2024

Minister of State for Women and Children Affairs
- In office 11 January 2024 – 6 August 2024
- Prime Minister: Sheikh Hasina
- Preceded by: Fazilatun Nessa Indira
- Succeeded by: Sharmeen Murshid

Member of the Bangladesh Parliament for Gazipur-4
- In office 23 April 2012 – 6 August 2024
- Preceded by: Sohel Taj

Personal details
- Born: 8 September 1961 (age 64) Gazipur, East Pakistan, Pakistan
- Party: Bangladesh Awami league
- Parents: Tajuddin Ahmad (father); Syeda Zohra Tajuddin (mother)
- Relatives: Sohel Taj (brother); Afsaruddin Ahmad (uncle)

Simeen Hussain Rimi (born 19 August 1961) is a Bangladesh Awami League politician, a former Jatiya Sangsad member representing the Gazipur-4 constituency and a former state minister for Ministry of Women and Children Affairs. She was elected in the 10th Parliamentary Elections held on 5 January 2014 and in the 11th Parliamentary Elections on 31 December 2018. She was chairperson of the parliamentary standing committee of the Ministry of Culture. In November 2022, she became a member of Awami League Presidium.

== Early life and education ==
Rimi was born in 1961 to Tajuddin Ahmad, the inaugural Prime Minister of Bangladesh, and Syeda Zohra, another politician. Rimi has two sisters, Mahjabin Ahmad Mimi and Sharmin Ahmad Reepi, and a brother, Sohel Taj. She married Mushtaq Hussain.

== Career ==
Rimi was the Jatiya Sangsad member from Gazipur-4 (Kapasia).
