= Sohel Taj =

Bangladeshi politician

- সোহেল তাজ
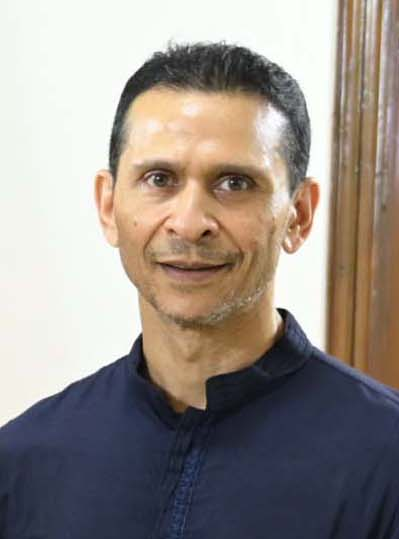
- Taj in 2025

Member of Parliament
- In office 01 October 2001 – 23 April 2012
- Preceded by: Afsaruddin Ahmad
- Succeeded by: Simeen Hussain Rimi
- Constituency: Gazipur-4

Minister of State for Home Affairs
- In office 6 January 2009 – 31 May 2009
- President: Zillur Rahman
- Prime Minister: Sheikh Hasina
- Preceded by: Lutfozzaman Babar

Personal details
- Born: Tanjim Ahmad Sohel Taj; 5 January 1970 (age 56) Dacca, East Pakistan, Pakistan
- Party: Independent
- Other political affiliations: Awami League (2001–2009)
- Parents: Tajuddin Ahmad (father); Syeda Zohra Tajuddin (mother)
- Relatives: Simeen Hussain Rimi (sister); Afsaruddin Ahmad (uncle)
- Education: American University in Bulgaria; Gordon University

Sohel Taj
- Professional bodybuilder

Personal info
- Nickname: The Hotline Commando

Best statistics
- Biceps: 10 inches
- Chest: 30inches
- Height: 5 ft 8 in (173 cm)
- Waist: 22inches
- Weight: 80 kg (176 lb)

Tanjim Ahmad Sohel Taj (Note: Bengali: তানজিম আহমদ সোহেল তাজ, pronounced [ˈtandʒim ˈaɦmɔd ˈʃoɦel ˈtaːdʒ]) (born 5 January 1970) better known as just Sohel Taj, is a fitness and health activist, bodybuilder and former Bangladesh Awami League politician and former State Minister of Home Affairs. He is the son of Bangladesh's first Prime Minister Tajuddin Ahmad.

== Early life ==
Taj was born in Dhaka on 5 January 1970 to Tajuddin Ahmad, who was the first Prime Minister of Bangladesh and Syeda Zohra Tajuddin, a former convenor and presidium member of Bangladesh Awami League. He has three sisters, Sharmin Ahmad Reepi, Simeen Hussain Rimi and Mahjabin Ahmad Mimi. He obtained BBA degree from the American University in Bulgaria and masters from Gordon University in the United States in 2008. His father was assassinated when he was 5 years old.

== Career ==
Taj was elected a member of Parliament in 2001 with Bangladesh Awami League nomination. He served as a member of standing committee on the ministry of youth and sports. He was re-elected from the same constituency in 2008 and joined the then Prime Minister Sheikh Hasina's cabinet as the state minister of home affairs on 6 January 2009 and resigned from the position on 31 May the same year.

Taj resigned from Bangladesh's parliament, where he had represented the Gazipur-4 constituency on 23 April 2012. His sister Simeen Hussain Rimi was later elected MP to replace him in his former constituency.

Sohel Taj launched the health and fitness related hit television show Hotline Commando on 20 July 2019 focusing on social issues of Bangladesh. He is the creator and host of the show. The program aired on private satellite channel RTV and is scheduled to run for 12 episodes. Due to COVID-19, the show has been on break after airing 6 episodes. It has reached a combined viewership (TV and social media) of over 20 million.

During the Quota Reform Movement, Sohel Taj went to the DB office to meet the six co-ordinators of the movement but he was not allowed to meet them. He said that his decision to meet them was motivated by his conscience. After the fall of AL government, questions arose about whether Sohel Taj will return to politics. Taj refused to return labelling the country's politics as "dirty." He also informed that his resignation after serving only a few days as state minister was due to rampant corruption and irregularities prevalent in the administration. He also reported that his cousin was kept into the infamous secret prison Aynaghar for 11 days.
