= Nurul Islam (economist) =

Bangladeshi economist (1929–2023)

- নুরুল ইসলাম
- Born: 1 April 1929; Chittagong, Bengal, British India
- Died: 9 May 2023 (aged 94); Washington, D.C., U.S.
- Education: University of Dhaka; Harvard University
- Occupation: Economist

Nurul Islam (1 April 1929 – 9 May 2023) was a Bangladeshi economist, philanthropist, and politician. Islam is famous for his contributions during the independence war of Bangladesh, as well as for his pivotal role in the economy and foreign affairs during the 1970s as cabinet minister and deputy chairman of the Planning Commission. He was the closest advisor to, and confidant of, Sheikh Mujibur Rahman (first Prime Minister of Bangladesh) throughout the 1960s and until the Prime Minister's assassination in 1975.

Islam is responsible for establishing Bangladesh's economy, financial system, and trade relationships; his leadership laid the foundations for Bangladesh's unprecedented economic growth over five decades. Islam has mentored many Bengali power players (including Prime Minister Fakhruddin Ahmed and Nobel Peace Prize Winner Muhammad Yunus). Today, the Islam family is prominent in South Asian business, with significant holdings across manufacturing, construction, and financial services; the companies they own employ more than 60,000 workers. The Islam family is active in philanthropy, particularly in support of education, diabetes research, and women's rights. They founded Shakti Foundation, Bangladesh's third largest charity organization, as well as several urban-area hospitals and schools.

== Background and education ==
Islam grew up in Chittagong. His father was a high school headmaster who had inherited several local businesses in the retail and financial services sectors, and his mother was a hereditary landowner's daughter. He struggled with his eyesight growing up (the state of medicine at the time was not able to diagnose the cause of his periods of near-blindness; this illness receded, however, with age). Due to his vision challenges, he developed a prodigious, near-photographic memory - something that colleagues and friends would comment on in later years.

He completed his IA from Chittagong College. After studying in Presidency college, Calcutta and the University of Dhaka, he earned his PhD in economics from Harvard University in 1955. He attended the university on a Pakistani government scholarship - this scholarship was awarded to a single economics graduate student in united Pakistan each year, based on their scores in standardized examinations, and enabled this student to pursue graduate studies abroad. Islam graduated at the top of his Harvard PhD class; he wrote his dissertation thesis on international trade.

== Career ==
Islam joined the University of Dhaka as an associate professor of economics in 1960, and chaired the department starting in 1962. In 1965, he left the university to become the director of the Pakistan Institute of Development Economics (later Bangladesh Institute of Development Studies).

Islam's contributions to independence began in the 1950s, when he began writing about the trade and monetary imbalances between East and West Pakistan. In 1961, he organized a series of seminars on the economic disparities between the two Pakistans. This series was instrumental in stirring up support for independence. Soon, his work on financial and economic independence drew the attention of Sheikh Mujibur Rahman, who drew Islam into his inner circle of businesspeople and political leaders. At the request of the founding father, Islam spearheaded the 6-Point Programme, a list of economic demands presented to the Pakistani government prior to the struggle for independence.

Once the revolution began in 1971, as a result of his association with the Sheikh, Islam's family began to be persecuted by the Pakistani army. Several members of his extended family were imprisoned; his wife and children fled to Paris, and he was smuggled over the border into India, from where he made his way to Connecticut. Once he arrived in the United States, he began a concerted effort to negotiate with Henry Kissinger and others in Richard Nixon's government to alleviate US support for Pakistan, which was aligned to the American axis during the Cold War. He remained in the US, rallying international support for the Bangladeshi cause, until the war ended in December of that year.

Post-independence, in December 1971, Islam was asked by the Sheikh to return home to help rebuild the war-torn, fledgling nation. He returned to Dhaka as cabinet minister and Head of the first Planning Commission of Bangladesh. The head of the Bangladesh Planning Commission was the third most powerful figure in the Government of Bangladesh, and responsible for establishing and running the newly established economy.

In this role, Islam established Bangladesh's trade relationships, monetary system, and economic structure. As a favorite of the Sheikh, Islam was also drawn into key foreign policy initiatives, as the Prime Minister worked to establish relationships with the major world powers of the time. He accompanied the Sheikh on diplomatic visits to all major allies, including the USSR, Persia, and Japan.

As the Sheikh consolidated his power in Bangladesh, several groups in the nation began to grow uneasy, feeling that he was heading down a path into dictatorship. During this time, Islam was known for exerting a moderating influence on the Sheikh, as well as on the parties surrounding the Prime Minister who were jostling for power.

Tensions continued to escalate. Seeking to further consolidate power, Sheikh Mujib asked Islam to assume an additional Cabinet Post, that of Finance Minister. Islam agreed, but asked for a sabbatical prior to assuming this extra Cabinet role.

Islam and his family left for Europe during this sabbatical in the summer of 1975. While Islam and his family were in Europe, there was a major political coup. The Bangladeshi army rebelled against Sheikh Mujib, and assassinated him and his family on 15 August 1975.

Now a political exile, Islam and his family remained abroad. He used his Western network to arrange positions for himself and his family in Europe and America.

For the next 50 years, Islam lived between the United States, England, and Italy. While he never resumed political office, he held a variety of positions across the private sector and academia, and continued to exert unofficial influence over Bangladeshi politics (the army rule which was instituted in 1975 did not last past 1980). His family used his influence to grow into major players in garment manufacturing, plastics, packaging, construction, real estate, and consumer lending. The Islam family's affiliated companies employ more than 60,000 people. The family also has significant land holdings in Gulshan and Topkhana.

Islam was awarded many ceremonial honors over the course of his life. He was a Nuffield Foundation fellow at the London School of Economics and at Cambridge University, a Rockefeller fellow at the Netherlands School of Economics, and a fellow at St Antony's College, Oxford. Islam also served as the Assistant Director General of the Economic and Social Policy Department of Food and Agriculture Organization (FAO).

Islam received the Bangladesh Bank Award (2009) for his contributions to theoretical and applied development economics, and his pivotal role in Bangladesh's independence and economy. He has authored 29 books.

== Personal life ==
Post-independence, Islam lived between Europe, the United States, and Bangladesh. In his latter years, Islam's primary base was in the U.S.; he lived with his wife Rowshan Ara, with residences in Potomac, Maryland, and Washington, D.C.

Islam died in Washington, D.C., on 9 May 2023, at the age of 94.

== Works ==
- Development Strategy of Bangladesh (1978)
- Development Planning in Bangladesh: A Study in Political Economy (1979)
- Foodgrain Price Stabilization in Developing Countries: Issues and Experiences in Asia (1996)
- Exploration in Development Issues: Selected Articles of Nurul Islam (2003)
- Making of a Nation, Bangladesh: An Economist's Tale (2003)
- An Odyssey: The Journey of My Life (2017)

== Awards ==
- Bangladesh Bank Award (2009)
- BDI Lifetime Achievement Award (2013)
