= Q. M. Rahman =

Bangladeshi civil servant and Provincial Minister of East Pakistan

Qazi Mukhlesur Rahman (March 1906 – 10 May 1986) was a Bangladeshi civil servant and Provincial Minister of East Pakistan. He served in senior administrative roles across British India and Pakistan, including as Commissioner of Rajshahi Division and Director General of the Fisheries Department, before being appointed to the Second Monem ministry in November 1966.

== Early life and education ==
Rahman was born in March 1906 into the Qazi family of Kalai in Bogra District, Eastern Bengal and Assam, British India (in present-day Kalai Upazila, Joypurhat District, Bangladesh). His father was Qazi Baharuddin Ahmad.

In 1921, Rahman passed the Secondary School Examination from Kalai Mayeen Uddin High School. Two years later, in 1923, he passed the Intermediate Examination from Carmichael College. In 1927, he graduated with Honours in English from the University of Calcutta and subsequently obtained a Bachelor of Laws degree from the University College of Law, Calcutta. In October 1930, he entered government service as a Deputy Magistrate in Burdwan District.

== Career ==
Following the partition of India in 1947, Rahman continued in civil service under the government of Pakistan. In 1956, he visited the United States as part of an exchange leadership programme, and in 1959 he attended the general session of the Food and Agriculture Organization in Rome.

During his administrative career, Rahman served as district administrator of Mymensingh and Comilla, and as Commissioner of Rajshahi Division. He was also appointed Director General of the Fisheries Department and of the Board of Revenue of the government of East Pakistan.

Following his retirement from government service in early 1966, Rahman was appointed to the Second Monem ministry on 1 November 1966 and served as East Pakistan's Provincial Minister for Food, Agriculture and Cooperatives.

== Personal life ==
Rahman had two daughters and one son.

== Death and legacy ==
Rahman returned to Kalai in March 1986 and died there on 10 May 1986.

The government of Pakistan awarded him the Sitara-e-Quaid-e-Azam in 1969.
