= Syeda Zohra Tajuddin =

Bangladesh Awami League politician (1932–2013)

- সৈয়দা জোহরা তাজউদ্দীন
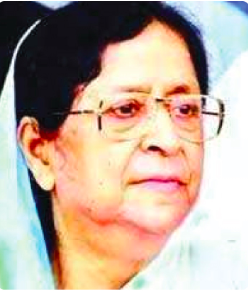

Spouse of the Prime Minister of Bangladesh
- In office 10 April 1971 – 12 January 1972
- Prime Minister: Tajuddin Ahmad
- Preceded by: Position established
- Succeeded by: Sheikh Fazilatunnesa Mujib

6th President of Awami League (Convenor)
- In office 4 April 1977 – 16 February 1978
- Preceded by: Abul Hasnat Muhammad Qamaruzzaman
- Succeeded by: Abdul Malek Ukil

Personal details
- Born: 24 December 1932 Kaliganj, Bengal, British India
- Died: 20 December 2013 (aged 80) Dhaka, Bangladesh
- Party: Awami League
- Spouse: Tajuddin Ahmad (m. 1959; died 1975)
- Relatives: Simeen Hussain Rimi (daughter); Tanjim Ahmad Sohel Taj (son); Afsaruddin Ahmad (brother-in-law)
- Education: University of Dhaka

Syeda Zohra Tajuddin (24 December 1932 – 20 December 2013) was a Bangladesh Awami League politician. She was a leader of the party and served as its president from 1980 to 1981. She was the wife of the first prime minister Tajuddin Ahmad.

== Biography ==
Tajuddin was born on 24 December 1932. She studied social science at the University of Dhaka. She married Tajuddin Ahmad in 1959. She kept the Awami league together after the 1975 coup that led to the assassination of the president of Bangladesh and Awami League Sheikh Mujibur Rahman and her husband Tajuddin Ahmad and other high ranking Awami League politicians. She reorganized Awami League after being elected its convener in 1977. She remained a presidium member of the party until her death on 20 December 2013.

== Personal life ==
Tajuddin had four children. Three daughters, Sharmin Ahmad Reepi, Simeen Hussain Rimi and Mahjabin Ahmad Mimi, and a son, Tanjim Ahmad Sohel Taj. Ex Major Munirul Islam Chowdhury (Husband of eldest daughter), Amr Khairy Abdalla (husband of second daughter), Keivan Niksejel (husband of youngest daughter). She was buried at the Banani Graveyard.
