= Tajuddin Ahmad =

Prime Minister of Bangladesh from 1971 to 1972

Bangataj (Note: Bengali: বঙ্গতাজ, romanized: Bôṅgôtaj, pronounced [ˈbɔŋɡoˌtadʒ]; lit. 'Crown of Bengal') Tajuddin Ahmad
- তাজউদ্দীন আহমদ
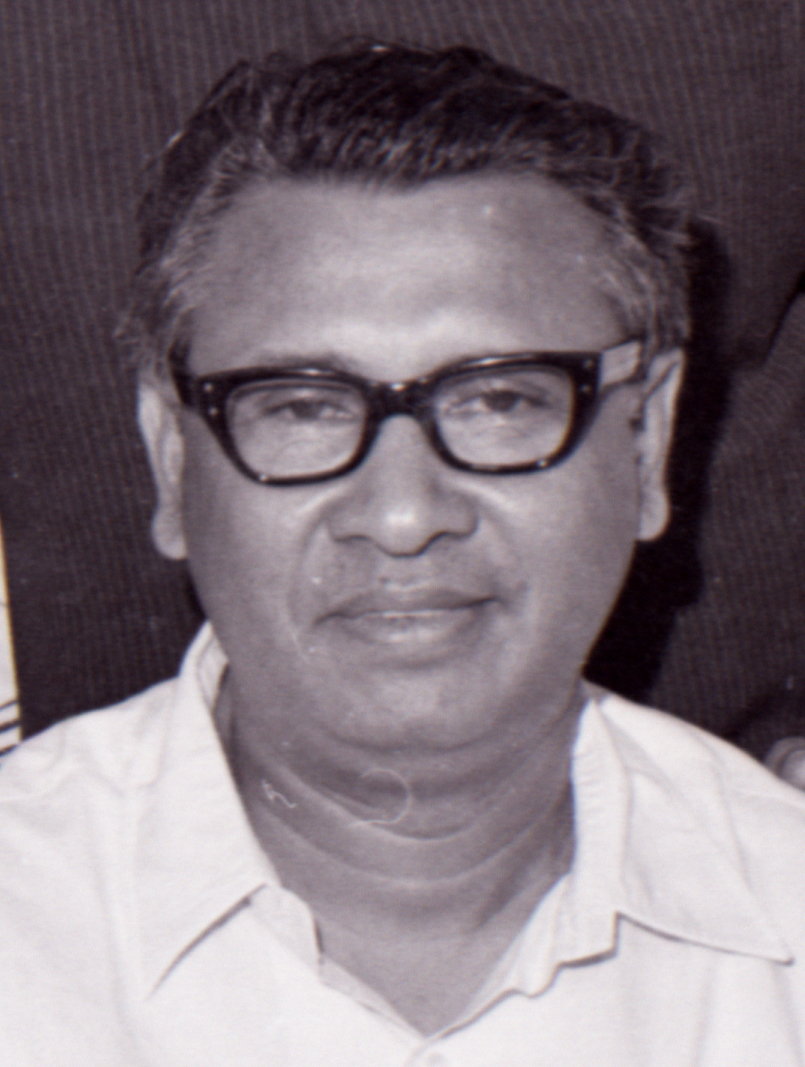
- Ahmed in 1970

1st Prime Minister of Bangladesh
- In office 17 April 1971 – 12 January 1972
- President: Sheikh Mujibur Rahman; Syed Nazrul Islam (acting)
- Vice President: Syed Nazrul Islam
- Preceded by: Office established
- Succeeded by: Sheikh Mujibur Rahman

2nd Minister of Finance and Planning
- In office 12 January 1972 – 26 October 1974
- President: Abu Sayeed Chowdhury; Mohammad Mohammadullah
- Prime Minister: Sheikh Mujibur Rahman
- Preceded by: Muhammad Mansur Ali
- Succeeded by: Sheikh Mujibur Rahman

Personal details
- Born: Tajuddin Ahmad Khan; 23 July 1925 Kapasia, Bengal, British India
- Died: 3 November 1975 (aged 50) Dacca Central Jail, Dhaka, Bangladesh
- Cause of death: Assassination
- Citizenship: British India (until 1947); Pakistan (1947–1971); Bangladesh (from 1971)
- Party: Awami League (from 1949); Muslim League (1947–1949)
- Other political affiliations: All-India Muslim League (before 1947)
- Spouse: Syeda Zohra Tajuddin
- Children: 4, including: Rimi; Sohel Taj
- Relatives: Afsaruddin Ahmad (brother)
- Education: University of Dhaka
- Awards: Independence Award

Tajuddin Ahmad (Note: Bengali: তাজউদ্দিন আহমদ, romanized: Tajuddin Ahmôd, pronounced [ˈtadʒuˌdːin ˈaɦmɔd]) (23 July 1925 – 3 November 1975) was a Bangladeshi politician. He led the first government of Bangladesh as its prime minister during the Bangladesh Liberation War in 1971–1972, and is regarded as one of the most instrumental figures in the birth of Bangladesh. He was the 2nd Finance Minister of Bangladesh in 1972–1974.

Tajuddin began as a Muslim League youth worker in British India. He belonged to the Dhaka-based pro-democracy, secular Muslim League faction, which broke with the Muslim League's reactionary party line after the partition of India and the birth of Pakistan. As a member of the short-lived youth organisation, the Jubo League, he actively participated in the Language Movement in 1952. In 1953, he joined the Awami Muslim League (later the Awami League), a dissident offshoot of the Muslim League. The following year, he was elected a member of the East Pakistan Provincial Assembly. As a close confidant, he assisted Sheikh Mujibur Rahman in revitalising the Awami League into a secular political party during Ayub Khan's regime in the late 1960s.

As the General Secretary of the Awami League from 1966, Tajuddin coordinated the party during the tumultuous late 1960s and early 1970s, suffering imprisonment on several occasions. He formulated the early draft of the historic six-points demand that would eventually lead to the birth of Bangladesh. He coordinated the Awami League's election campaign for the 1970 Pakistani general election, in which the League gained a historic parliamentary majority. He also coordinated the non-cooperation movement of March 1971, precipitated by President Yahya Khan's delay in transferring power to the elected legislators. Tajuddin was among Sheikh Mujib's delegation in the Mujib-Yahya talks to settle the constitutional disputes between East and West Pakistan and transfer power to the elected National Assembly. Following the Pakistani army's crackdown on the Bangladeshi population on 25 March 1971, Tajuddin escaped to India. In the absence of Sheikh Mujib, he initiated the set up of the Provisional Government of Bangladesh in 1971 and headed it, operating in exile in India, as its prime minister.

In independent Bangladesh, Tajuddin served as the Minister of Finance and Planning in Sheikh Mujib's Cabinet from 1972 to 1974. He was also a member of the committee drafting the Constitution of Bangladesh. He resigned from the cabinet in 1974 to live a quiet life. Following Sheikh Mujib's assassination in a coup d'état, Tajuddin was arrested and assassinated on 3 November 1975, along with three senior Awami League leaders in prison.

== Early life ==
Tajuddin Ahmad Khan (Note: Tajuddin dropped his surname, Khan, while registering for his matriculation examination.) was born on 23 July 1925 at Dardaria, which is a village in Dhaka District, Bengal Presidency, British India (now Gazipur District in Bangladesh), to Maulavi Muhammad Yasin Khan and Meherunnesa Khanam in a conservative, middle-class Muslim family. He was the eldest of nine siblings—three brothers and six sisters.

The Bengal province, the eastern frontier of India, consisted of two conceptual regions: West Bengal had a Hindu majority population and housed the provincial capital, Kolkata, a thriving centre of trade and culture; East Bengal, Tajuddin's home, was an impoverished hinterland of West Bengal, with a mostly poor Muslim peasant population. During Tajuddin's formative years, British rule in India was nearing its end, and Bengal was battered by famines, communal tensions, and other problems. It was a hotbed of anti-British activism. Against this backdrop, his political activism began at a very early age, sometimes interrupting his studies. The anti-British activists of Bengal were his earliest political inspiration.

After attending a few schools in Gazipur, Tajuddin moved to Dhaka, his district headquarters and the principal town in East Bengal, (Note: Gazipur used to be one of the constituent sub-divisions of the Dhaka district. Later, in independent Bangladesh, like all sub-divisions, it was also graduated to a district.) for further studies. In Dhaka, he went to Saint Gregory's High School, where he matriculated in 1944, securing 12th position in undivided Bengal. After matriculation, Tajuddin briefly lost interest in formal education because of his activism, pausing his studies for three years. At his mother's insistence, he resumed his studies and was admitted to Dhaka College. There he attended classes irregularly because of his activism. As a result, he could not take the Intermediate of Arts examination from there; instead, he took it from a private college as an irregular student in 1948 and passed, securing fourth position in East Bengal. He obtained a BA with honours in economics from the University of Dhaka. He also took his law degree from the University of Dhaka.

Tajuddin lost his father at age twenty-two and took over family responsibilities.

== Late British India ==
With British rule in India nearing its end and Hindu-Muslim tensions on the rise, in 1940, the political party, the All-India Muslim League, brought about the Pakistan Movement, which demanded a separate state for the Muslims of India. Founded in 1906 in Dhaka, the Muslim League's leadership came mostly from the feudal elites. Headquartered in Kolkata, the Bengal Provincial Muslim League had had little grassroots organisation or activity in Bengal for a long time. Abul Hashim succeeded Huseyn Shaheed Suhrawardy as the general secretary of the Bengal Provincial Muslim League in 1943. Tajuddin, still a school student in Dhaka, joined the Muslim League in the same year. Hashim envisioned the creation of a 'leftist' faction within the Muslim League against the prevailing leadership. He set out to reform the Muslim League organisation in Bengal. As part of this reform, in 1944, Hashim helped found the Muslim League party office in Dhaka at 150 Moghultuli Lane. The office became a haunt for the party's progressive young dissidents, including Tajuddin, led by Kamruddin Ahmed, a schoolteacher and later a lawyer. As one of the four 'full-time' party workers, Tajuddin helped Kamruddin publish the party newspaper.

Traditionally, the Muslim League in Dhaka and East Bengal at large was dominated by the Nawab family of Dhaka; many of its members held high offices in the party. Their residential palace, Ahsan Manzil, served as the de facto party headquarters. A rift developed between the Ahsan Manzil group and the 150 Moghultuli (Muslim League) group. Khwaja Nazimuddin and his brother Khwaja Shahabuddin led the Ahsan Manzil group; both held high offices in the provincial government and in the party. Their propaganda, aided by The Azad newspaper, the Muslim League's mouthpiece, labelled Hashim and his followers as communists in disguise. Both groups contested elections in district party committees. In the 1944 Dhaka district committee elections, Tajuddin helped Kamruddin and the Moghultli group win a surprising victory against Shahabuddin's intrigues.

The Pakistan Movement intensified after the Second World War and the Hindu-Muslim communal riots in Bengal in 1946. In August 1947, India was partitioned, and Pakistan was born as a result, causing mass migration and violence. Pakistan consisted of two geographically non-contiguous wings, thousands of miles apart. The far larger West Wing (current Pakistan), adjacent to the western border of India, comprised four provinces, and only East Bengal constituted the much smaller eastern wing (now Bangladesh), adjacent to the eastern edge of India. (Note: East Bengal was officially named East Pakistan in 1956, the year Pakistan adopted its constitution.) Abul Hashim and Shaheed Suhrawardy opposed the partition of Bengal and did not migrate to Pakistan immediately. Even though it was leading the Pakistan cause, the Muslim League's inadequacy to lead Pakistan as a nation was apparent to factions within it. A faction of the 150 Moghultuli Lane-based Muslim League sceptics, led by Kamruddin Ahmed, formed the Gano Azadi League, a civil rights organisation with a small following, (Note: Not to be confused with the one founded in 1976 in independent Bangladesh.) in July 1947, a month before the partition of India. In contrast to the Muslim League, the organisation took progressive views on many issues, like the economy, culture, and education. Apart from Tajuddin, other founding members of the Gano Azadi League included Oli Ahad and Mohammad Toaha.

== East Pakistan ==
=== Early activism ===
In the newly independent Pakistan, Tajuddin was a resident student of Fazlul Huq Muslim Hall in Dhaka University. The political atmosphere was grim in East Bengal. From the beginning, tensions developed between East and West Pakistan over various issues. (Note: Except for predominant Muslim populations, East and West Pakistan had little in common. East Pakistan, or East Bengal, was not even a part of the Pakistan state as originally imagined by its ideological fathers; Pakistan was rather conceived to be comprising approximately the territories of West Pakistan.) The ruling Muslim League provincial government, led by the chief minister Khwaja Nazimuddin, mostly sided with West Pakistan on various issues. The university became an important centre of political activism; as usual, Tajuddin became an enthusiastic participant in them. Many Kolkata-based pro-Hashim workers migrated to Dhaka after the Partition and joined the 150 Moghultuli group. Among them, Sheikh Mujibur Rahman, who had enrolled in Dhaka University, and a few others founded the East Pakistan Muslim Students' League (popularly called the Students' League) on 4 January 1948. Tajuddin joined the party as a founding member.

At the same time, as a frequenter of Dhaka's political circles, Tajuddin was drawn increasingly towards the national political arena. He witnessed the marginalization of his 150 Moghultuli faction of the Muslim League at their leader Hashim and Suhrawardy's absence in the political scene of East Bengal and the Ahsan Manzil group's rise. In 1949, the 150 Moghultuli faction cut ties with the Muslim League and founded the Awami Muslim League (later the Awami League) with Maulana Bhashani, a Muslim cleric turned politician, as its president. Tajuddin admired Maulana Bhashani but showed little interest in his party initially. He and his disillusioned former Muslim League fellows kept meeting regularly at their haunts, speculating on the characteristics and the future of Pakistan, envisioning new political parties. Members of that group, notably Oli Ahad and Mohammad Toaha, founded the Jubo League, (Note: Not to be confused with the Awami Jubo League, also commonly known as the Jubo League, founded later in 1972, in independent Bangladesh.) a youth organisation, at a youth convention that took place in March 1951. Tajuddin was elected a member of the Jubo League executive committee at its first annual council later that year.

East and West Pakistan came into a major conflict over the state language question within a month of Pakistan's independence in 1947. West Pakistan leaders, including Muhammad Ali Jinnah, the founder of Pakistan, advocated for Urdu as the only state language of multilingual Pakistan. In response to protests from various intellectual and political bodies of Bengali-speaking East Bengal, the state language decision was postponed for a while. However, as authorities continued efforts to push Urdu in various guises, the simmering dispute resurged in 1951. The ruling Muslim League provincial government, led by Nurul Amin, who succeeded Nazimuddin as the chief minister in 1948, again sided with West Pakistan. Tajuddin, as a Jubo League worker and an early participant in the movement, was elected a member of the University State Language Action Committee to advance for Bengali to be a state language, set up in early 1951 by the students of Dhaka University. The movement got its spark on 27 January 1952, as Prime Minister Khwaja Nazimuddin of Pakistan declared that, "the state language of Pakistan shall be Urdu and no other language." On 21 February 1952, police opened fire on protest processions at various places, killing several protesters. Police raided the Jubo League's office on 21 and 22 February; Tajuddin, who was residing in the office at that time, barely avoided arrest. As a result of the movement, the government conceded and granted Bengali to be a state language alongside Urdu.

Despite its critical role in the Language Movement, the Jubo League was unsuccessful as a mainstream political organisation. Its members made their way into other established political parties. Many of them joined the Awami Muslim League, which, after the Language Movement of 1952, emerged as East Pakistan's most promising political party.

=== Awami League ===
Leaving his studies unfinished, Tajuddin left Dhaka in 1951 to work as a master at a school in Sreepur, close to his home in Gazipur. The school was in poor condition. During his visits to Dhaka at that time, besides taking part in political activism, he often lobbied for managing government aid for the school. After a year and three months, he returned to Dhaka and resumed his studies for his BA in economics in late 1952.

With the Provincial Assembly elections due next year, Tajuddin joined the Awami Muslim League in 1953. His Jubo League comrade Oli Ahad followed; the same year, he was elected as the general secretary of the Dhaka District chapter of the party. The Awami Muslim League participated in the election in a coalition with some other parties (called the United Front or Jukta Front), with their joint 21-point election manifesto embodying many popular demands. Tajuddin, running on the Jukta Front ticket, was elected from his constituency, defeating the general secretary of the East Pakistan Muslim League, Fakir Abdul Mannan, by an overwhelming three-to-one proportion of the vote. At twenty-nine, he became one of the youngest elected legislators of the assembly. The Jukta Front won a majority in the election, ending the Muslim League's dominance in East Pakistan. However, within months of taking office, the central government dissolved the Jukta Front cabinet on the pretext of conspiring to secede by its chief minister, A. K. Fazlul Huq. Tajuddin was arrested following the dismissal of the cabinet. He took the law examination from prison and earned a BA degree in law. After his return from prison, he was elected as the social welfare and cultural secretary of Awami League in 1955.

Pakistan framed its constitution in 1956, more than eight years after its independence, under which a general election was supposed to be held in early 1958. In 1958, however, a military junta, led by General Ayub Khan, the then minister of defence, seized power in a coup d'état. Ayub Khan declared himself president and chief martial law administrator. Four years later, in 1962, he instituted a new constitution, abrogating the old one, legitimising his junta's rule. He also reformed the election process in his favour and brutally suppressed democratic activities. Tajuddin was arrested in 1958, just after Ayub Khan took over, and was imprisoned for a year. Under Ayub's rule, the suffering and deprivation in East Pakistan increased. West Pakistan dominated politics, administration, commerce, industry, and education; West Pakistan's cities, like Lahore, Karachi, and Rawalpindi, became centres of decision making, and thrived as centres of trade, commerce, and opportunity. The East Pakistan capital, Dhaka, was relegated to near obscurity. West Pakistani businesspeople dominated major East Pakistan businesses involved in jute and tea, for example.

Since the mid-1950s, the Awami Muslim League had been turning towards secularism; it dropped 'Muslim' from its name in 1955, becoming known as the Awami League. It became vocal over the economic disparity between East and West Pakistan and began gaining popularity among the masses. In the Awami League, Tajuddin became close to Sheikh Mujibur Rahman, one of the founders of the party. Since 1962, following party President Suhrawardy's policy, the Awami League joined a front of democratic parties, called the National Democratic Front (NDF), against Ayub's military regime and ceased functioning as an individual party. In 1964, after Suhrawardy's death, Mujib, the general secretary of the Awami League, revived it as a party in the face of opposition by some senior leaders. Mujib's influence in the Awami League only increased with Tajuddin as his 'right-hand man'.

=== Six points and the 1969 uprising ===
The Six Points

1. The Constitution should provide for a Federation of Pakistan in its true sense based on the Lahore Resolution, and the parliamentary form of government with supremacy of a Legislature directly elected on the basis of universal adult franchise.
2. The federal government should deal with only two subjects: Defence and Foreign Affairs, and all other residual subjects should be vested in the federating states.
3. Two separate, but freely convertible currencies for two wings should be introduced; or if this is not feasible, there should be one currency for the whole country, but effective constitutional provisions should be introduced to stop the flight of capital from East to West Pakistan. Furthermore, a separate Banking Reserve should be established and separate fiscal and monetary policy be adopted for East Pakistan.
4. The power of taxation and revenue collection should be vested in the federating units and the federal centre would have no such power. The federation would be entitled to a share in the state taxes to meet its expenditures.
5. There should be two separate accounts for the foreign exchange earnings of the two wings; the foreign exchange requirements of the federal government should be met by the two wings equally or in a ratio to be fixed; indigenous products should move free of duty between the two wings, and the constitution should empower the units to establish trade links with foreign countries.
6. East Pakistan should have a separate military or paramilitary force, and Navy headquarters should be in East Pakistan.

The 1965 India-Pakistan War severely damaged the Ayub regime's prestige. The opposition parties of Pakistan sought to exploit the situation by negotiating with the junta for more democratisation; they called for a conference in Lahore on 3 February 1966 and invited rising Awami League leader Sheikh Mujibur Rahman, to win the league's support. Meanwhile, just before the conference, President Ayub Khan visited Dhaka at the end of January 1966 and invited East Pakistani political leaders, including Sheikh Mujib, to a talk. Mujib wanted to seize the opportunity to put forward a few demands, highlighting East Pakistan's interests to the president. Prior to the meeting, Tajuddin, a close confidant of Mujib by then, drafted the demands as a number of specific points, a precursor of the historic six-points demand. However, the demands did not make it to Ayub Khan on that occasion.

Sheikh Mujib and Tajuddin attended the Lahore Conference and put forward the revised version of those points as the six-point demand to the committee. They called for a new constitution, ensuring autonomy of provinces on key matters like monetary policy and defence instead of the prevalent absolute central governance. West Pakistani leaders present there received the six points with absolute disappointment; they viewed it as a secessionist proposal and refused to raise it in the conference.

In the party council of the Awami League on 14–15 March 1966, Sheikh Mujib was elected president and Tajuddin its general secretary. Promulgated by the Awami League, six points became the voice of the East Pakistani people, their charter of emancipation, while getting little support in West Pakistan. The military junta and the West Pakistani political parties viewed the six points as a threat to Pakistan's unity. The Ayub Administration was determined to suppress six points by any means. Awami League workers, already being brutally oppressed, came under even greater persecution. Tajuddin himself was arrested in 1966, as were many other senior Awami League leaders. In 1968, while Tajuddin was still in prison, Sheikh Mujib and some others, mostly East Pakistani military officials, were arrested on charges of high treason in the infamous Agartala Conspiracy Case.

In the face of the mass popular uprising of 1969, the Ayub regime began showing signs of compromise. On 1 February 1969, Ayub Khan announced a conference (popularly known as the Round Table Conference or RTC) in Rawalpindi on 17 February 1969 with the opposition parties, including the Awami League. The Awami League declared the RTC would not gain credibility with their president, Mujib, imprisoned and refused to attend the conference. Ayub Khan rejected the opposition party forum's plea for Mujib's release, citing legal difficulties. A legal battle ensued between the Awami League and the junta over Mujib's release. Faced with popular pressure, the conference was postponed. On 17 February 1969, Tajuddin, just released from imprisonment, joined his two Awami League comrades, lawyers Kamal Hossain and Amir-ul Islam, who were already leading the legal proceedings, on their flight to Rawalpindi to negotiate Mujib's release. Despite its initial objections, the Ayub government eventually conceded and agreed to release Mujib unconditionally so that he could attend the Round Table Conference. Finally, authorities released Sheikh Mujib, the unanimous leader of East Pakistan, from prison on 23 February 1969.

Tajuddin attended the Round Table Conference as part of the Awami League delegation led by Mujib. At this conference, the Awami League's six points again came under strong opposition from the West Pakistani politicians. On 13 March, in the concluding session, Ayub Khan approved the federation proposal; however, he refused to comment on the autonomy of the provinces as the six points demanded, citing it as a matter that only elected legislators could decide. This effectively postponed it until a general election could take place.

President Ayub Khan resigned shortly after the conference, ending his 11-year rule; his commander-in-chief of the army, General Yahya Khan, who reportedly had been pulling the strings of the Round Table Conference from behind the scenes, took over as president. Yahya immediately abrogated the Constitution, imposed martial law, and promised a general election.

=== The 1970 general election ===
The 1970 general election, the first of its kind in Pakistan after years of military rule, was held on 7 December 1970. Of the 300 parliamentary seats of the National Assembly, East Pakistan and West Pakistan constituted 162 and 138 seats, respectively. The Awami League, led by Sheikh Mujibur Rahman, secured 160 out of 162 seats in East Pakistan and none in West Pakistan, still becoming the majority. Its closest contender, the Pakistan People's Party (PPP), led by Zulfikar Ali Bhutto, won 81 seats in West Pakistan and appointed no candidates in East Pakistan. Tajuddin ran and was elected from his constituency. With the elections concluded, the president was to inaugurate the National Assembly, and the elected legislators were to draft a new constitution. With the Awami League being in the majority in the assembly, there remained no obstacle to writing a constitution that complied with the six points demand. The Awami League quickly embarked on drafting a constitution proposal accordingly before the assembly was inaugurated. Sheikh Mujib and the senior Awami League leaders, including Tajuddin, met intensely with a group of legal and economic experts for about a month at a house on the banks of the river Buriganga, on which Dhaka stands. From those discussions, in which Tajuddin played a key role, an unofficial constitution draft came out.

Meanwhile, the Awami League's victory soared the anxiety among the West Pakistani opposition parties and the military junta alike. The PPP desired a coalition between the two. After the election, on 20 December in Lahore, the PPP leader Bhutto described Punjab and Sindh as 'bastions of power in Pakistan', two states where his party had won a sweeping majority. So, he asserted, no central government can function without his party's support. To which Tajuddin, as the general secretary of the Awami League, replied in an official statement:

The Awami League is quite competent to frame a constitution and form the Central Government. That would be done with or without the support of any party... The Punjab and Sind can no longer aspire to be the "bastion of power". If we are to move towards a better future, such claims should be avoided as they generate unnecessary and harmful controversy.

Unable to secure any compromise on six-points from the Awami League leadership in the previous months, on 1 March, Yahya Khan postponed the 3 March inaugural session of the National Assembly indefinitely. Sheikh Mujib immediately called for non-cooperation by his people, effectively taking control of East Pakistan. Mujib kept issuing regular directives to people and party workers. Tajuddin, Kamal Hossain, and Amir-ul Islam were put in charge of drafting the directives. Non-cooperation was an immediate success; people spontaneously defied a curfew imposed by the army. On 7 March 1971, however, in a historical speech in front of a massive gathering, Sheikh Mujib called for an indefinite general strike, asking his people to be prepared for any emergency, and issued an ultimatum to the military junta. On 15 March, Tajuddin, as the general secretary of Awami League, issued 35 directives to the people. On the same day, Yahya Khan arrived in Dhaka, and a series of meetings took place between them until late March. Mujib assured Yahya that his party would not harm West Pakistan's interests. He also pressed Yahya to withdraw the declaration of martial law immediately; Yahya refused, claiming legal difficulties with that. Mujib offered his assistants, Tajuddin and Kamal Hossain, to meet Khan's legal experts to sort out the difficulties. Yahya accepted the offer, and Kamal Hossain and Tajuddin met his experts and made some progress. Troops and arms were being concentrated from West Pakistan. Mujib urged Yahya to stop the reinforcements, warning him of the consequences. The Awami League leadership expected that on 24 March final negotiations would take place; however, that day passed with no meeting. On 25 March they learned that Yahya's delegation had secretly left Dhaka, leaving the discussions unfinished, killing any hope for a peaceful settlement.

== Bangladesh Liberation War ==
Though Yahya Khan promised to resume talks on 25 March, everybody was apprehensive that an armed conflict was imminent. Sheikh Mujibur Rahman kept ordering his workers to escape to safety. Despite Tajuddin's and others' repeated insistence, Mujib refused to escape until 25 March, fearing it would be used as a pretext to massacre innocent Pakistanis. Tajuddin also remained in Dhaka until 25 March, the night Yahya secretly left Dhaka and the Pakistan Army cracked down on the Bangladeshi population there, killing thousands of people. Like the entire nation, the Awami League's leadership was taken by surprise; they scattered, each busy finding their own path to safety and losing contact with one another for a few days. On the night of 25 March, Tajuddin and his trusted long-time comrade Amir-ul Islam left their homes and families and went into hiding. They secretly left Dhaka on 27 March for neighbouring India.

Tajuddin came to learn days later that Sheikh Mujib had been arrested on the night of 25 March. Before his arrest, he broadcast the independence of Bangladesh in a radio message.

After a perilous journey, mostly on foot through Kushtia and Chuadanga, Tajuddin and Amir-ul Islam crossed the Indian border on 30 March. At the border outpost, the regional head of the Indian Border Security Force (BSF), Golok Majumdar, received them. Majudmar immediately transported them to Kolkata with him. There, on the night of 30 March and the next day, Tajuddin and Islam had discussions with BSF chief Rustamji, who had come from Delhi after learning of their arrival. On 1 April, Tajuddin and Islam, accompanied by Majumdar, left for Delhi aboard a military cargo plane.

=== Formation of the Bangladesh Government in Exile ===
In Delhi, Tajuddin met with India's Prime Minister Indira Gandhi on 4 April. At their second meeting the following day, Gandhi informed him that Sheikh Mujib had been arrested and transported to Pakistan, though Pakistan had not made this official yet. Asked about the Bangladesh government, he replied, having consulted with Amir-ul Islam the day before, that a provisional government had been formed with Sheikh Mujib as its president and the senior Awami League leaders who had attended the Mujib-Yahya talks as cabinet members. Tajuddin presented himself as the prime minister. Except for Sheikh Mujib, the whereabouts of the other members was unknown. Two crucial resolutions were reached in that meeting: India opened its borders to Bangladeshi refugees, saving millions of lives in the upcoming days when Pakistani aggression reached outside major cities, and India allowed the Bangladesh government to operate within Indian territory. The Indian government also promised to help the Bangladeshi liberation war by any means possible.

While Tajuddin was in Delhi, part of the Awami League leadership congregated in Kolkata. Many of them, notably the youth and student leaders, viewed Tajuddin's meeting with the Indian prime minister as an outrageous act sidelining them. (Note: As a contingency plan, the Awami League leadership was supposed to meet at the house of a former Awami League worker settled in Kolkata named Chittaranjan Sutar. Before leaving for Delhi, Tajuddin asked his BSF hosts to find Sutar's address; they could not find it. Tajuddin had to leave without contacting him. This added to the youth leaders' suspicions.) On returning to Kolkata, on 8 April, Tajuddin found and met the group of leaders, including A H M Qamaruzzaman, and informed them of the Delhi meeting's outcomes, including the provisional government. Some of the leadership present there questioned Tajuddin's legitimacy as prime minister. The youth leader Sheikh Mani rejected the idea of the cabinet outright. Instead, he proposed setting up a revolutionary council dedicated to conducting armed resistance only. Amir-ul Islam explained the inadequacy of the revolutionary council and the necessity of a legal government. After this, and following Qamaruzzaman's mediation, most of the leadership at the meeting accepted Tajuddin's proposal.

Tajuddin remained committed to the idea of a provisional government, believing only a legitimate government could muster the international support necessary for the liberation war. On 10 April, accompanied by Amir-ul Islam, Sheikh Mani, and others, he boarded an old Dakota plane borrowed from the Indian government and set off in search of other cabinet members scattered around the borders. Flying at low altitudes, the plane stopped at various airstrips at the borders, most of them built by the British Army during the Second World War. After picking up cabinet members Muhammad Mansur Ali, Abdul Mannan, and Syed Nazrul Islam from various places on the way, on 11 April, the entourage arrived in Agartala, capital of the Indian state of Tripura, where many other Awami League leaders had taken refuge, including Khondaker Mostaq Ahmad and Colonel M. A. G. Osmani.

Before reaching Agartala, during Tajuddin and his group's stop in Shiliguri on 10 April, Golok Majumdar arranged the broadcast of Tajuddin's first radio speech as the prime minister of Bangladesh from a clandestine radio station. (Note: Sheikh Mani, who was also among the group, asked to postpone the broadcast and thereby announcing the formation of the government until they reach Agartala. Tajuddin asked Islam to postpone the broadcast accordingly. However, Islam, pressed by Majumdar, gave permission to broadcast without informing Tajuddin.) The speech was recorded in Delhi from a draft prepared by Islam and Rehman Sobhan, an Awami League economist who also escaped Dhaka after the 25 March crackdown and made it to Delhi. In his speech, Tajuddin informed the people of Bangladesh of the formation of the government and the war's progress. He praised the spontaneous armed resistances taking place in various parts of the country and recognized their leaders. He also gave instructions to the people on the conduct of the war. Describing the Pakistani army's onslaught, Tajuddin asked the international community to express solidarity with the freedom struggle of Bangladesh. The speech was broadcast again the next day on Akashvani Kolkata, the regional service of the Indian state radio, for a broader audience.

Reunited in Agartala, the Awami League leadership pondered the cabinet agenda and distributing cabinet offices. In the absence of President Sheikh Mujib, Syed Nazrul Islam served as acting president, Khondaker Mostaq took the Ministry of Foreign Affairs, (Note: While the rest of the senior leadership had already accepted Tajuddin as the prime minister, Khondaker Mostaq, being the most senior among the leaders, initially laid claim to being the rightful candidate for that position. After being persuaded by others, he eventually accepted the foreign minister's office.) Qamarauzzaman was given the State Minister's office, Mansur Ali the Finance Minister's, and Colonel Osmani, a retired veteran of the Pakistan army turned Awami League politician, was appointed commander-in-chief of the armed forces. The entire cabinet returned to Kolkata on 13 April, set to take oath at some yet unoccupied place in Bangladesh.

The oath-taking ceremony took place on 17 April 1971, at a village along the India-Bangladesh border called Baidyanathtala, in Kushtia district (currently Meherpur district), on Bangladeshi soil. Professor Yusuf Ali read the proclamation of independence, drafted by Amir-ul Islam and reviewed by Subrata Roy Chowdhury, a lawyer at the Calcutta High Court, retroactively in effect from 10 April. Answering a journalist during the ceremony, Tajuddin named the place Mujibnagar, after Sheikh Mujibur Rahman. Later the government-in-exile came to be popularly known as the Mujibnagar Government. Mujibnagar was abandoned quickly after the oath ceremony as participants feared a raid by Pakistani forces. The government settled in Kolkata, in exile, for the rest of the war—briefly at a house on Ballyganj Circular Road and then at 8 Theatre Road.

On 15 April, Tajuddin secretly met Hossain Ali, the deputy high commissioner of Pakistan, in Kolkata. Tajuddin persuaded Ali, along with his Bengali staff, to switch allegiance to the Bangladesh government the day after the cabinet took their oaths. As promised, Ali and 70 employees at the Deputy High Commission swore allegiance to the Bangladesh Government, turning the Pakistan High Commission on 9 Circus Avenue into the Bangladesh Mission in Kolkata for good. The mission came to house part of the government's offices, most importantly, the Ministry of Foreign Affairs.

=== Organising the Liberation War ===
Starting in Dhaka and other major cities on 25 March, Pakistani forces occupied most of Bangladesh by late April, creating an influx of refugees into the bordering states of India, most notably in West Bengal and Tripura. The number of refugees would eventually reach ten million. As the war broke out, Bengali soldiers serving in various Pakistani battalions revolted and put up armed resistance against Pakistani forces all over Bangladesh. Rebel commanders of these battalions, unaware of the establishment of a provisional government, met along with Colonel Osmani on 4 April. At that meeting, the Bangladesh Forces (BDF, popularly called Mukti Bahini) was formed, with Osmani as its commander-in-chief. Young people at various locations put up armed resistance. Unable to overcome the Pakistani forces' onslaught, owing mainly to a lack of heavy arms and manpower, both soon retreated into Indian territory. As Pakistani forces spread around the country, thousands of youths from occupied Bangladesh crossed the border into India, seeking arms and training to join the fight against the Pakistani occupation force. Among the Tajuddin government's top priorities was coordinating those ongoing war efforts. In mid-July (10 to 15) the sector commanders of the BDF met at a conference at the Bangladesh Government's headquarters on Theatre Road in Kolkata. The conference set a course for the conduct of the war in the coming months. The irregular guerrilla warriors were named Gono Bahini (popularly called Muktijoddha or "Freedom Fighter") and the regular force was named "Regular Force" (popularly called Mukti Fouj).

Under Tajuddin's premiership, many Bengali bureaucrats, diplomats, and military officers serving Pakistan defected to the new Government of Bangladesh. The government soon established a capable civil administration. On 27 July, Tajuddin, as the prime minister, issued an order (GA/810/345) that divided occupied Bangladesh into nine administrative zones, called Zonal Administrative Councils, for administrative convenience. On another order, issued on 18 September, the number was increased to eleven. Each zonal council was chaired by an elected legislator, and several administrative officers were appointed by the government under him. Amidst occasional pressures from within his party, Tajuddin played a key role in keeping the administration from becoming politicised.

Tajuddin employed a number of capable diplomats in his government. In early April, he commissioned economist Rehman Sobhan to stop the economic advisor to Pakistani president Yahya Khan, economist M. M. Ahmad, from acquiring fresh foreign aid for Pakistan and persuade Bangladeshi officials serving at Pakistani foreign missions to switch allegiance to Bangladesh.

Apart from organising the liberation war, over the nine months, Tajuddin had to deal with various problems originating from within his party. As Sheikh Mujib did not explicitly name his successor in his absence, a faction within the Awami League denounced his premiership from the beginning; they continued with their relentless efforts to discredit him. A lack of coordination among various government bodies arose on occasion.

The Chhatra League, the student wing of the Awami League, and workers united under a separate force, initially called the Bangladesh Liberation Force (BLF) and later Mujib Bahini. Though initially commissioned by Osmani to recruit youths for the regular Bangladesh Forces, they eventually emerged as an independent armed force under the auspices of the Indian intelligence agency Research and Analysis Wing (RAW). Mujib Bahini clashed with the regular forces at various places. Sector commanders of the regular forces and Osmani urged the government to bring them under the same command. Tajuddin himself expressed his concern about Mujib Bahini to Indian officials on occasion and to Prime Minister Indira Gandhi at their meeting on 22 October. The situation, however, never improved.

By August, Minister of Foreign Affairs Khondaker Mostaq Ahmad and his cohorts at his ministry secretly established a liaison with the United States, a key ally of Pakistan, without the government's knowledge. With Sheikh Mujib on trial in Pakistan for high treason, the same group was also spreading the 'either freedom or Mujib' doctrine. Indian intelligence agencies had discovered the fact just before Mostaq was scheduled to lead the Bangladesh delegation to the United Nations General Assembly in New York City. Tajuddin removed Mostaq from the UN delegation and sacked him later in December, after the war.

In September, 40 members of the national and provincial assemblies of the South Zone issued a statement expressing dissatisfaction with Tajuddin's performance as prime minister and demanding his resignation from the cabinet and the Awami League.

== Post-independence career ==
External videos
- Tajuddin and Syed Nazrul Islam's interview to AP at Dhaka on 25 December 1971, AP, YouTube video

After nine months of war, the Pakistani forces in Bangladesh surrendered at Dhaka on 16 December 1971. Tajuddin and his cabinet returned from Kolkata to Dhaka, now the capital of the newly independent Bangladesh, on 22 December 1971. (Note: Tajuddin's absence from the surrender ceremony and his cabinet's delay in returning to Dhaka has been the subject of much controversy. Many sources claim Mujib Bahini's presence in Dhaka as the main cause. See Ahmad, Abul Mansur (2013). আমার দেখা রাজনীতির পঞ্চাশ বছর [Fifty Years of Politics As I Saw It] (in Bengali) (7th ed.). Dhaka: Khoshroj Kitab Mahal. pp. 597–598. ISBN 978-9844380004. for a contemporary account.) In an address at the Dhaka airport that day and at the Dhaka Secretariat the following day, Tajuddin declared Bangladesh would be built upon the principles of socialism, democracy, and secularism. On 23 December, recognising the sacrifice of the freedom fighters and their tremendous potential in building the newborn nation, the Tajuddin government declared that all enlisted and non-enlisted freedom fighters would be inducted into a National Militia. His administration quickly embarked on the immediate task of restoring law and order in the newly independent country.

Released from nine months of imprisonment in Pakistan, Sheikh Mujibur Rahman returned to Dhaka on 10 January 1972. Tajuddin and Mujib met privately on 11 January to decide the future leadership. As was the popular wish, Tajuddin happily agreed to transfer the prime minister's office to Mujib. Though Mujib initially proposed a presidential government, at Tajuddin's insistence, he accepted a parliamentary system. In the reformed cabinet, with Sheikh Mujib as prime minister, Tajuddin was put in charge of the Ministry of Finance and Planning. He was also appointed a member of the committee in charge of drafting the Constitution of Bangladesh.

As minister of finance, Tajuddin strongly resented foreign aid, particularly from the United States. He regarded the World Bank as an instrument of the United States' domination. During World Bank president Robert McNamara's visit to Bangladesh in 1972, Tajuddin's response was cold, and their meeting ended bearing no fruit. According to the 1970 election manifesto spirit, in the first Bangladesh National Budget in 1972, Tajuddin declared the nationalisation of industries. This came under strong criticism. One of the major arguments against it was that nationalised industries would be unable to find enough skilled manpower to run them. Tajuddin and his fellow planning commission member Nurul Islam argued that if private enterprises can find manpower within the country, the same must be the case for public enterprises, and they imposed their policies accordingly.

In the newly independent country, the Mujib government struggled to address numerous problems. A dissident group of Chhatra League, Awami League's student wing, emerged as a political party called Jatiya Samajtantrik Dal (JSD) in late 1972. The ongoing economic crisis led to a famine in 1974. Anti-Awami League sentiment was on the rise.

In the new Awami League and in the new cabinet, Tajuddin found himself increasingly cornered by rival factions. He was growing distant from Mujib; they differed on a number of issues: the National Militia scheme, consisting of freedom fighters, proposed by Tajuddin was abandoned; instead, a paramilitary force called the Jatiya Rakkhi Bahini, dominated by the members of the Mujib Bahini, was formed. His frustration with the government and his party was rising quickly; rumours of Tajuddin's desire to resign from the cabinet were circulating. Sensing his frustration, the burgeoning, newly formed political party Jatiya Samajtantrik Dal, desperately in search of a prominent face, approached him. He declined their offer. By September 1974, he had resolved to resign from the cabinet after a month-long state tour. However, his intention to resign somehow reached the top of the government before he could act, and within days of his return from the tour in October, the prime minister ordered him to resign. On 26 October 1974, Tajuddin resigned from the cabinet. After his resignation, he remained largely inactive in politics.

From early 1975, Sheikh Mujib began a radical reform of the government and its administration. The Constitution was amended on 25 January 1975 to introduce a presidential form of government, declaring Mujib president. On 24 February 1975, President Mujib banned all political parties except one national party, called the Bangladesh Krishak Sramik Awami League (BAKSAL). Tajuddin declined to join it and fell out with Mujib.

Despite their political differences, Tajuddin remained loyal to Mujib, and in July 1975, having heard rumours of plots against Mujib, rushed to warn him. Mujib did not take the threat seriously.

== Death ==
Capitalising on the growing unpopularity of the Sheikh Mujib government, a faction of the army staged a coup and killed Sheikh Mujib and a large part of his extended family on 15 August 1975. Khondaker Mostaq Ahmad, who held office in Sheikh Mujib's cabinet and was complicit in the conspiracy, immediately ascended to the presidency and imposed martial law.

Following these assassinations, Tajuddin was immediately placed under house arrest. On 22 August, he was arrested along with fellow Awami League leaders Syed Nazrul Islam, A H M Qamaruzzaman, and Muhammad Mansur Ali and imprisoned at the Dhaka Central Jail. On 3 November, amidst the chaos of a second coup staged by another faction of the army to overthrow the Mostaq regime, in what became infamously known as the "Jail Killing Day", Tajuddin, along with the other three imprisoned Awami League leaders, was killed inside the jail by a group of army officers on the instruction of President Mostaq.

== Family ==
On 26 April 1959, Tajuddin married Syeda Zohra Khatun (died 20 December 2013), a daughter of a professor. They had four children: three daughters—Sharmin Ahmad (Reepi), Simeen Hussain Rimi, and Mahjabin Ahmad (Mimi)—and one son, Tanjim Ahmad Sohel Taj.

Zohra was highly supportive of Tajuddin's political activism but had no involvement in politics during his lifetime. After the assassinations of Sheikh Mujib and Tajuddin, she reorganised and led the Awami League from 1975 to 1981.

Tajuddin's first daughter, Sharmin Ahmad, is an author and activist. His son, Sohel Taj, is a health and fitness activist and was minister of state for home affairs in Prime Minister Sheikh Hasina's cabinet in 2009. His second daughter, Simeen Hussain, was elected as a member of parliament for the Awami League in 2012.

== Historical evaluation ==
Though Tajuddin and Sheikh Mujib were men of different dispositions, they developed a highly fruitful political rapport between themselves, which proved to be crucial for the birth of Bangladesh. Mujib's biographer S A Karim contrasts between the two:

Mujib and Tajuddin were complete opposites in many ways. Mujib was a powerful orator and had an uncommon ability to win the trust and loyalty of the people by voicing in simple language their inner thoughts and longings ... Tajuddin was a man of different temperament and talents. He had a lively intellect and an orderly mind. He was no demagogue and he was most persuasive in smaller circles. He had a strong sense of duty and was extremely hard-working.

Mujib deferred to Tajuddin on many critical matters. As the PPP leader Zulfikar Ali Bhutto called for a public debate on the six points, which never took place, Mujib nominated Tajuddin to defend his case. During the constitution drafting discussions, after the 1970 elections, Mujib considered sending Tajuddin or Syed Nazrul Islam to lead the central government if such necessity would arise.

Sheikh Mujib used to be the key figure in the Awami League; most major decisions came from him. His arrest in the beginning of the liberation war created a critical leadership void that put Tajuddin in a difficult position. However, Tajuddin quickly earned Indian prime minister Indira Gandhi and her officials' trust. P N Haksar, Gandhi's secretary and adviser to her on the Bangladesh affair in the early months of the war, explains the reason behind the Indian government's preference for Tajuddin over other Awami League leaders as prime minister:

Tajuddin was found to be the only person who had right political ideas for the task Bangladesh had set before itself. The Government of India also realised that Tajuddin was irreplaceable in the sense that things have been even more chaotic if somebody else other than him took over. These two considerations decided the issue of continued Indian support to Tajuddin despite numerous representations from his opponents within Awami League.

India's unwillingness in recognising Bangladesh as a state and no direct military intervention in the early months caused frustration among the Awami League leadership; Tajuddin appreciated the difficulties involved in the matter. D P Dhar, who later replaced Haksar, remarks that Tajuddin was the only capable leader to lead the war:

Only Tajuddin was mentally equipped to lead Awami League out of a situation like this (liberation struggle). That was his biggest strength. He displayed all the initiatives, while his rivals (within Awami League) failed to formulate that else to look for apart from Indian recognition, followed by military attacks.

Tajuddin's initiative for a joint front of political parties, training the leftist youths as guerrillas, and refusals to politicise the administration made him unpopular in his party. His vocal stance against the Mujib Bahini made him unpopular among the youths.

The split between Mujib and Tajuddin started just after Mujib's return to Bangladesh after independence. S A Karim maintains that the enemies Tajuddin had earned during the war caused his downfall. Tajuddin's distance from Mujib frustrated him deeply. Economist Nurul Islam, who had been the deputy chairman of the Planning Commission of Bangladesh with Tajuddin as its chairman, describes their split as 'a great tragedy and bode ill for the future'. He observes:

It seemed to me that Tajuddin was frequently too outspoken in public. He was deeply frustrated that he had lost the full confidence of Sheikh Mujib, which he had enjoyed in the pre-1971 days. He occasionally gave expression to his frustration in public and was not very tactful.

== Legacy ==
After his rise to the senior ranks of the Awami League leadership, Tajuddin had been involved in most major party and government policy decisions. He was an important bridge between the political leadership and the technocrats supporting them. His prominent collaborators include economists Nurul Islam and Rehman Sobhan; lawyers Kamal Hossain and Amir-ul Islam; author Anisuzzaman; and journalist Muyeedul Hasan.

Economist Nurul Islam said of him:

I had known and worked closely with Tajuddin before and after independence. He was not only a patriot but also in my view the most serious minded, conscientious and competent as well as the most hardworking among the Ministers. Tajuddin usually took the views of the Planning Commission seriously and, if convinced, strongly supported them during Cabinet discussions. The entire Planning Commission had great respect for him.

Economist Rehman Sobhan recalls his experience of working with Tajuddin in drafting the constitution after the 1970 election:

... Tajuddin Ahmad was quite as fertile in his contributions as any of the academics demonstration deep political insight dialectical skill and an extraordinary capacity to absorb and break down complicated technical issues to their basic essentials.

Just after independence, Time described him:

Tajuddin Ahmed, 46. Prime Minister, a lawyer who has been a chief organizer in the Awami League since its founding in 1949. He is an expert in economics and is considered one of the party's leading intellectuals.

Tajuddin used to be a regular and meticulous diarist. An active participant in the Bengali language movement, his diaries during the late 1940s and early 1950s chronicled first-hand accounts of the political activities and events of that time. Those diaries provided material for later researchers on the movement.

The documentary film Tajuddin Ahmad: An Unsung Hero, directed by Tanvir Mokammel, released on 25 March 2007, features Tajuddin's life and work.

Shahid Tajuddin Ahmad Medical College in Gazipur is named after Tajuddin.

== See also ==
- List of prime ministers of Bangladesh

== Sources ==
=== Late British India and Pakistan ===
- Ahmed, Kamruddin (2020) [First published September 1975 (vol 1) and March 1976 (vol 2)]. বাংলার মধ্যবিত্তের আত্মবিকাশ [Banglar Moddhobitter Attobikash] (in Bengali). Dhaka: Prothoma Prokashan. ISBN 978-984-525-106-8.
- Hashim, Abul (1998) [First published November 1974]. In Retrospect (2nd ed.). Chittagong: Bangladesh Co-operative Book Society. ISBN 984-493-029-4.
- Jahan, Rounaq (1994) [First published 1972 in New York]. Pakistan: Failure in national integration. Dhaka: The University Press Limited. ISBN 978-984-506-227-5.
- Umar, Badruddin (2017a) [First published November 1970]. পূর্ব বাংলার ভাষা আন্দোলন ও তৎকালীন রাজনীতি [Language Movement of East Bengal and the Contemporary Politics] (in Bengali). Vol. 1 (2nd ed.). Dhaka: Subarna. OCLC 576634866.
- —— (2017b). পূর্ব বাংলার ভাষা আন্দোলন ও তৎকালীন রাজনীতি [Language Movement of East Bengal and the Contemporary Politics] (in Bengali). Vol. 3 (2nd ed.). Dhaka: Subarna. OCLC 576634866.

=== Bangladesh Liberation War ===
- Anisuzzaman (1997). আমার একাত্তর [My Seventy-One (Memoir)] (in Bengali). Dhaka: Sahitya Prakash. ISBN 984-465-125-5.
- Hasan, Muyeedul (1992) [First published February 1986]. মূলধারা '৭১ [Mainstream '71] (in Bengali) (2nd ed.). Dhaka: The University Press Limited. ISBN 978-984-8815-63-2.
- Hossain, Doctor Kamal (1985). "১৮: ডক্টর কামাল হোসেন (সাক্ষাৎকার)" [18: Doctor Kamal Hossain (Interview)] (PDF). In Rahman, Hasan Hafizur (ed.). বাংলাদেশের স্বাধীনতা যুদ্ধ: দলিলপত্র [History of Bangladesh War of Independence: Documents]. Vol. 15. Dhaka: Ministry of Information, Government of the People's Republic of Bangladesh. pp. 143–193. ISBN 984-433-091-2.
- Imam, H T (2010) [First published February 2004]. বাংলাদেশ সরকার ১৯৭১ [Bangladesh Government 1971] (in Bengali) (3rd ed.). Dhaka: Agamee Prakashani. ISBN 978-984-401-783-2.
- Islam, Barrister Amir-ul (1985). "৯: ব্যারিস্টার আমিরুল ইসলাম (সাক্ষাৎকার)" [9: Barrister Amir-ul Islam (Interview)] (PDF). In Rahman, Hasan Hafizur (ed.). বাংলাদেশের স্বাধীনতা যুদ্ধ: দলিলপত্র [History of Bangladesh War of Independence: Documents] (in Bengali). Vol. 15. Dhaka: Ministry of Information, Government of the People's Republic of Bangladesh. pp. 51–110. ISBN 984-433-091-2.
- Rahman, Hasan Hafizur, ed. (1982a). "প্রথম অধ্যায়: ৬: বাংলাদেশবাসীর উদ্দেশ্যে প্রধানমন্ত্রী তাজউদ্দীন আহমদের ভাষণ" [First Chapter: 6: Prime minister Tajuddin Ahmad's address to the people of Bangladesh] (PDF). বাংলাদেশের স্বাধীনতা যুদ্ধ: দলিলপত্র [History of Bangladesh War of Independence: Documents]. Vol. 3. Dhaka: Ministry of Information, Government of the People's Republic of Bangladesh. pp. 7–12. ISBN 984-433-091-2.
- Rahman, Hasan Hafizur, ed. (1982b). "প্রথম অধ্যায়: ১২: কলিকাতাস্থ পাকিস্তানী ডেপুটি হাই কমিশনারের বাংলাদেশের পক্ষাবলম্বন" [First Chapter: 12: Pakistani Deputy High Commissioner in Kolkata Switches Allegiance to Bangladesh] (PDF). বাংলাদেশের স্বাধীনতা যুদ্ধ: দলিলপত্র [History of Bangladesh War of Independence: Documents]. Vol. 3. Dhaka: Ministry of Information, Government of the People's Republic of Bangladesh. pp. 30–32. ISBN 984-433-091-2.
- Salik, Siddiq (1997) [First published 1977 in Karachi]. Witness to Surrender. Dhaka: The University Press Limited. ISBN 978-984-05-1373-4.
- Sobhan, Rehman (1985). "৩৬: রেহমান সোবহান (সাক্ষাৎকার)" [36: Rehman Sobhan (Interview)] (PDF). In Rahman, Hasan Hafizur (ed.). বাংলাদেশের স্বাধীনতা যুদ্ধ: দলিলপত্র [History of Bangladesh War of Independence: Documents]. Vol. 15. Dhaka: Ministry of Information, Government of the People's Republic of Bangladesh. pp. 263–293. ISBN 984-433-091-2.

=== Post-independence career ===
- Ahmad, Mohiuddin (2014). জাসদের উত্থান পতন: অস্থির সময়ের রাজনীতি [Rise and Fall of JSD: Politics in the Time of Turmoil] (in Bengali) (10th ed.). Dhaka: Prothoma Prokashan. ISBN 978-984-90747-5-5.
- Anisuzzaman (2015). বিপুলা পৃথিবী [Rich Earth (Memoir)] (in Bengali). Dhaka: Prothoma Prokashan. ISBN 978-984-91201-9-3.

=== Others ===
- Ahmed, Siraj Uddin (2010) [First published 2008]. প্রধানমন্ত্রী তাজউদ্দিন আহমদ [Prime Minister Tajuddin Ahmad] (in Bengali) (2nd ed.). Dhaka: Bhaskar Prokashani. ISBN 984-300-001553-4. OCLC 776872677.
- Chowdhury, Serajul Islam (2019). তাজউদ্দীন আহমদের রাজনৈতিক জীবন [The Political Life of Tajuddin Ahmad] (in Bengali) (3rd ed.). Dhaka: Muktadhara. ISBN 978-984-8858-63-9.
- Islam, Nurul (2003). Making of a Nation, Bangladesh: An Economist's Tale. Dhaka: The University Press Limited. ISBN 984-05-1666-3.
- Karim, S. A. (2005). Sheikh Mujib: Triumph and Tragedy. Dhaka: The University Press Limited. ISBN 978-984-506-153-7.
