= Abdul Hye Choudhury =

Bangladeshi lawyer and politician

Provincial Minister for Law of East Pakistan
- In office 1965–1968
- Governor: Abdul Monem Khan
- Preceded by: A. T. M. Mustafa
- Succeeded by: Fakir Abdul Mannan

Personal details
- Born: 1923 Bhola Island, Backergunge District, Bengal Presidency, British India
- Died: 9 September 1976 (aged 52–53) Dhaka, Bangladesh
- Resting place: Banani graveyard
- Party: PMLC
- Education: University of Dhaka
- Profession: Lawyer

Abdul Hye Choudhury (1923 – 9 September 1976) was a Bangladeshi lawyer, politician, and judge. He served as Provincial Minister for Law of East Pakistan from 1965 to 1968 and subsequently as a judge of the East Pakistan High Court.

== Early life and education ==
Choudhury was born in 1923 on Bhola Island in Backergunge District, Bengal Presidency, British India. After completing his graduation from the Dacca School of Economics in 1943, he served as a commissioned officer of the government. He subsequently completed a degree in arts and a course in law.

== Career ==
In 1951, Choudhury joined the Federal Court of Pakistan and the Dacca High Court of the province of East Bengal as a lawyer, following the establishment of the Dominion of Pakistan. He served as vice-president of the Dacca High Court Bar Association, as a working member of the East Pakistan Bar Council, and as a member of the Dacca Secondary and Higher Secondary Education Board.

Following his election as a member of the National Assembly of Pakistan in 1962, he was appointed parliamentary secretary for law and assembly affairs. In 1965, he was appointed Provincial Minister for Law and Provincial Assembly Affairs of East Pakistan. He held that position until 1968. In the same year, he was appointed a judge of the Dacca High Court, serving in that capacity until 1970.

== Death ==
In April 1976, Choudhury developed a lung disease. In July of that year, he was admitted to PG Hospital in Dacca, where he received treatment for two months. He died of the disease at his residence in Dacca on 9 September 1976. He was buried at Banani graveyard.
