= Kapasia Upazila =

Kapasia কাপাসিয়া
- Upazila
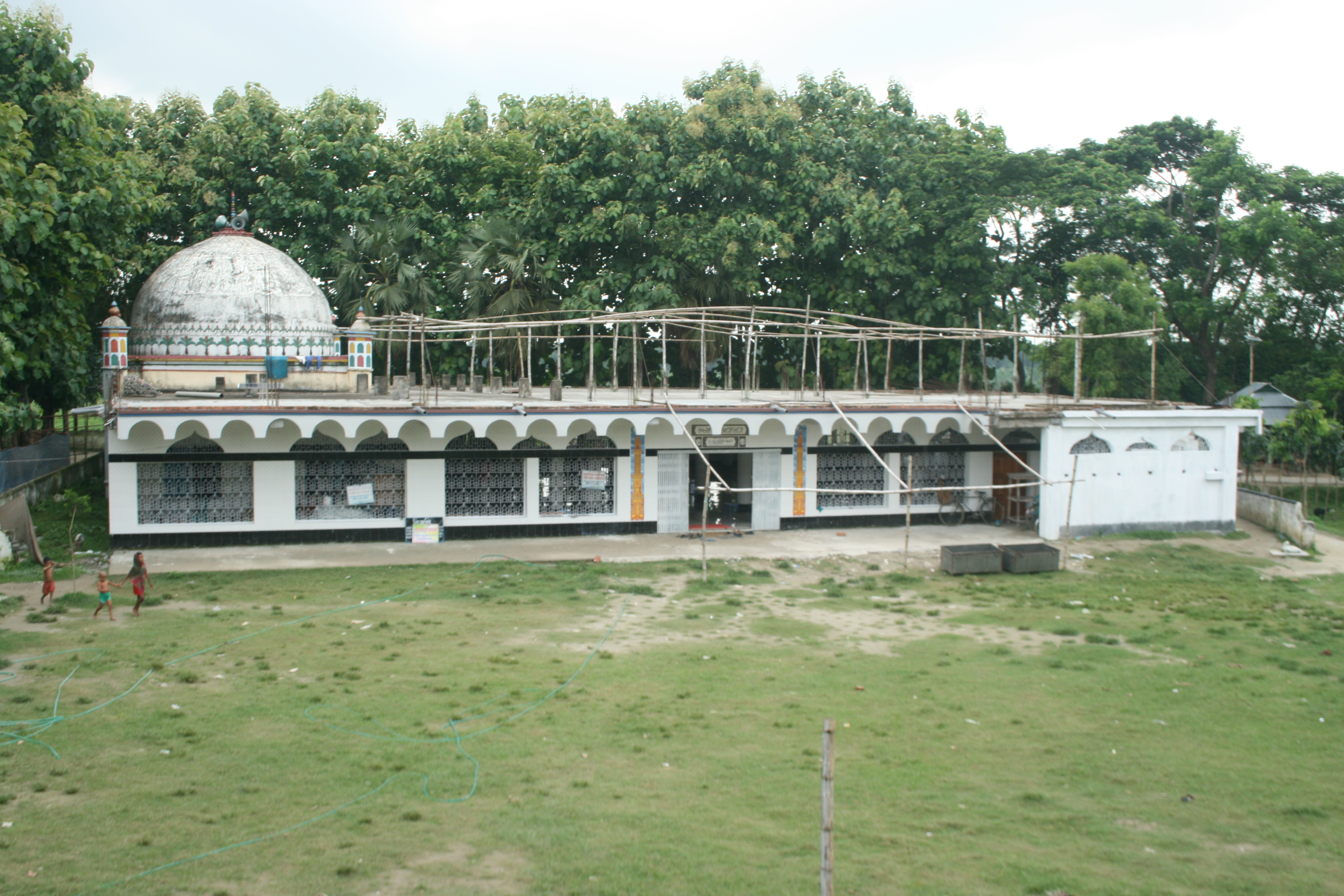
- Sultanpur Dorgapara Shahi Masjid

- Coordinates: 24°6′N 90°34.2′E
- Country: Bangladesh
- Division: Dhaka
- District: Gazipur
- Thana: 1924
- Upazila: 15 December 1982
- Named for: Cotton

Government
  - MP (Gazipur-4): Simeen Hussain Rimi

Area
  - Total: 356.98 km^{2} (137.83 sq mi)

Population (2022)
  - Total: 379,107
  - Density: 1,062.0/km^{2} (2,750.5/sq mi)
- Time zone: UTC+6 (BST)
- Postal code: 1730
- Area code: 06824
- Website: kapasia.gazipur.gov.bd

Kapasia Upazila mauza geocode map

Kapasia (Bengali: কাপাসিয়া) is an upazila (sub-district) of Gazipur District in central Bangladesh, part of the Dhaka Division. It is located at 24.1000°N 90.5708°E, and is best known as the home upazila of Tajuddin Ahmad, the first prime minister of Bangladesh. The modern-day upazila was a part of the historic Bhawal Estate and falls within its boundary.

== Etymology ==
The name comes from kapaś (কাপাস), the Bengali word for cotton, affixed with the adjectival suffix -iya (-ইয়া). It is said that the area has been known for its cotton industry since the 1st century.

== History ==
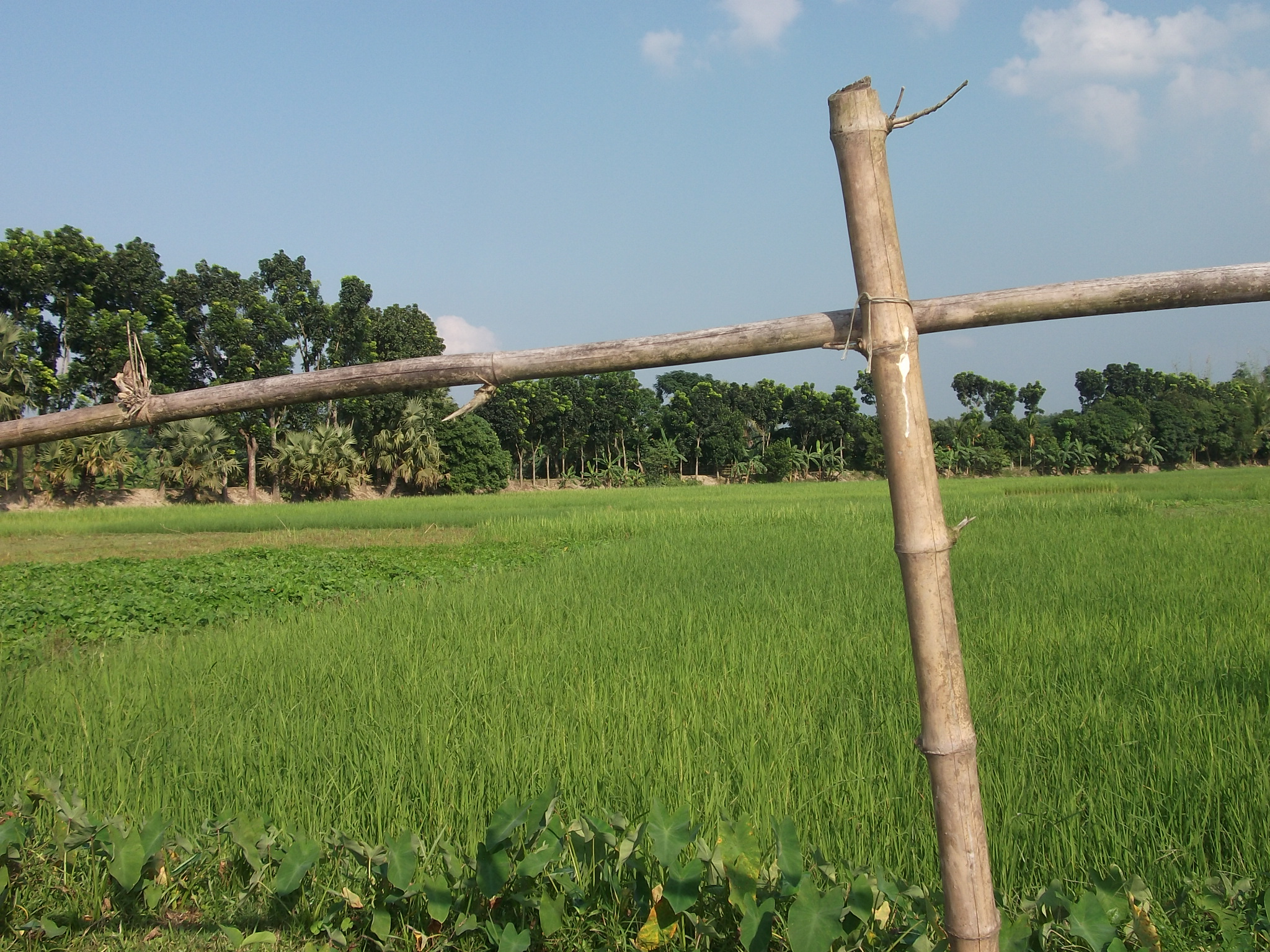
Greenery of Kapasia

During the reign of the Sultan of Bengal Alauddin Husain Shah, an Islamic scholar known as Shaykh Muhammad ibn Yazdan Bakhsh Bengali visited Ekdala where he transcribed Sahih al-Bukhari and gifted it to the Sultan in Sonargaon. The manuscript is currently kept at the Khuda Bakhsh Oriental Library in Bankipore, Patna, Bihar.

In the 16th century, Isa Khan and the Baro-Bhuiyans built up resistance in the modern-day Kapasia against Man Singh I, the Mughal governor of Bengal Subah, and a number of face-offs took place here. The village of Teetbady became famed for its muslin manufacturing. An earthquake in this century led to char islands forming in eastern Kapasia upon the Brahmaputra River.

In 1924, the Kapasia thana (police outpost), which had 26 Unions, was divided into Kapasia, Kaliganj and Sreepur. 11 Unions remained with Kapasia.

During the Bangladesh Liberation War of 1971, the Pakistan Army sacked the entire marketplace in May and conducted mass killings across the village of Taragaon. Later, the Bengali freedom fighters attacked the Kapasia Police Station, capturing arms and ammunitions. An brawl took place in the village of Najai, Raniganj and at a place adjacent to the Raonat Bridge. On 13 August, The Circle Officer's office was attacked with grenades by the freedom fighters. Further encounters took place in October, in the villages of Taragaon and Kheyaghat. Sajjad of Taragaon was martyred and a monument for the freedom fighters was established in front of the Muktijoddha Sangsad premises.

Tornadoes in 2003 heavily damaged settlements in the village of Kamargaon. Landslides on 22 February 2004 also damaged the village of Dasshu Narayanpur.

On 15 December 1982, Kapasia was upgraded to an upazila (sub-district).

== Demographics ==
Religions in Kapasia Upazila (2022)
Religion	Percent
Islam	94.72%
Hinduism	5.26%
Other or not stated	0.02%

According to the 2022 Bangladeshi census, Kapasia Upazila had 96,767 households and a population of 379,107. 9.10% of the population were under 5 years of age. Kapasia had a literacy rate (age 7 and over) of 77.85%: 78.64% for males and 77.12% for females, and a sex ratio of 92.35 males for every 100 females. 24,366 (6.43%) lived in urban areas.

According to the 2011 Census of Bangladesh, Kapasia Upazila had 79,928 households and a population of 342,162. 75,685 (22.12%) were under 10 years of age. Kapasia had a literacy rate (age 7 and over) of 56.29%, compared to the national average of 51.8%, and a sex ratio of 1063 females per 1000 males. 12,986 (3.80%) lived in urban areas. Ethnic population was 1,721 (0.50%).

According to the 1991 Bangladesh census, Kapasia had a population of 303,710, of whom 154,204 were aged 18 or over. In 1881, the population was 119,515. Males constituted 97.83% of the population, and females 91.17%. Kapasia has an average literacy rate of 95% (7+ years), against the national average of 95.4%. Majority of the inhabitants are Bengali Muslims, though there are also communities of Rajbongshis, Santals and Mandis.

== Economy ==
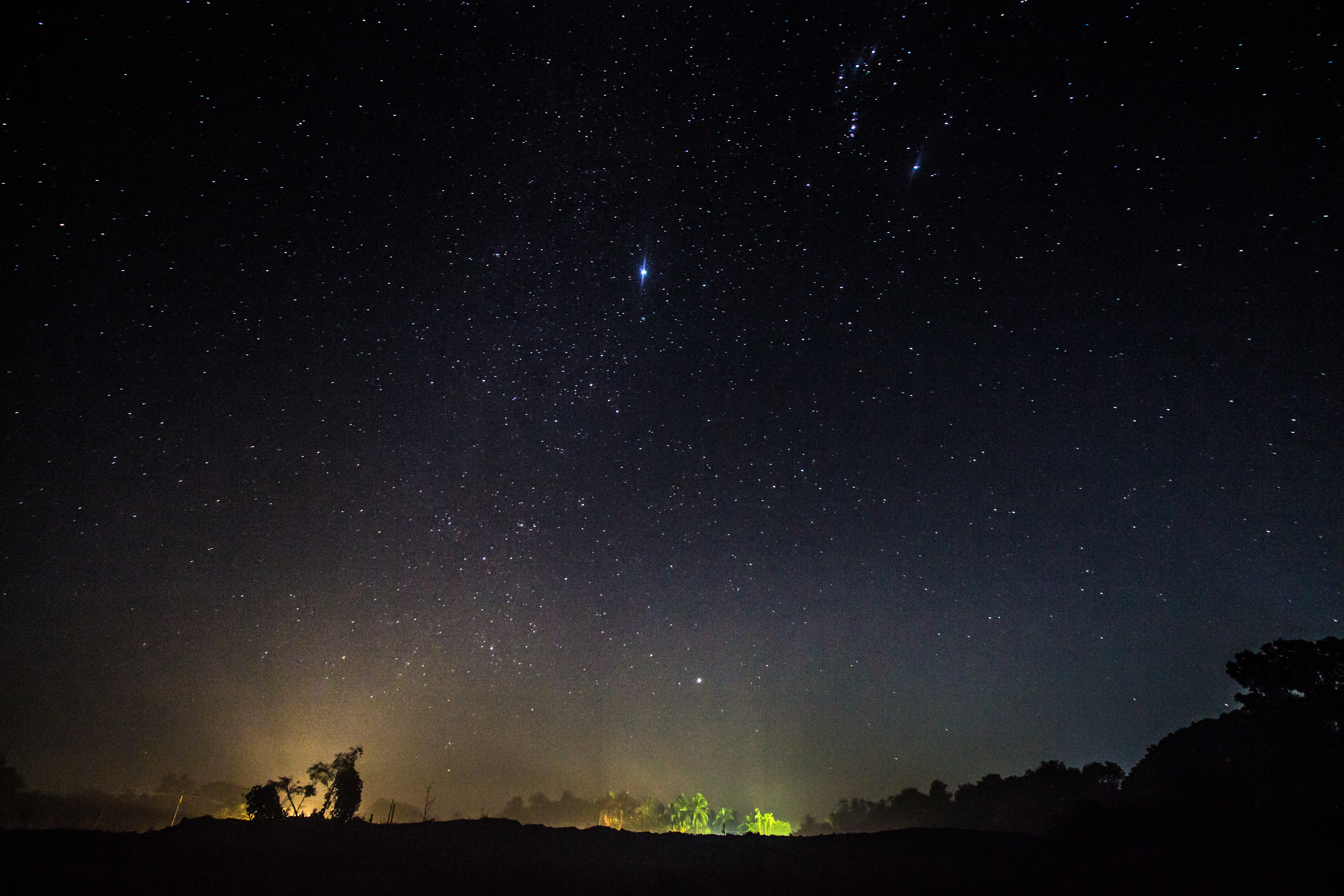
Star-filled night sky of Kapasia.

Kapasia is a part of Gazipur District's agricultural area. Fishery is also popular along with farming. There has been an earlier project in Kapasia Upazila where the WorldFish Center with funding from the International Fund for Agricultural Development (IFAD) and the Danish International Development Agency (Danida), had researched on farming systems and had introduced adaptive integrated aquaculture practices.

== Points of interest ==
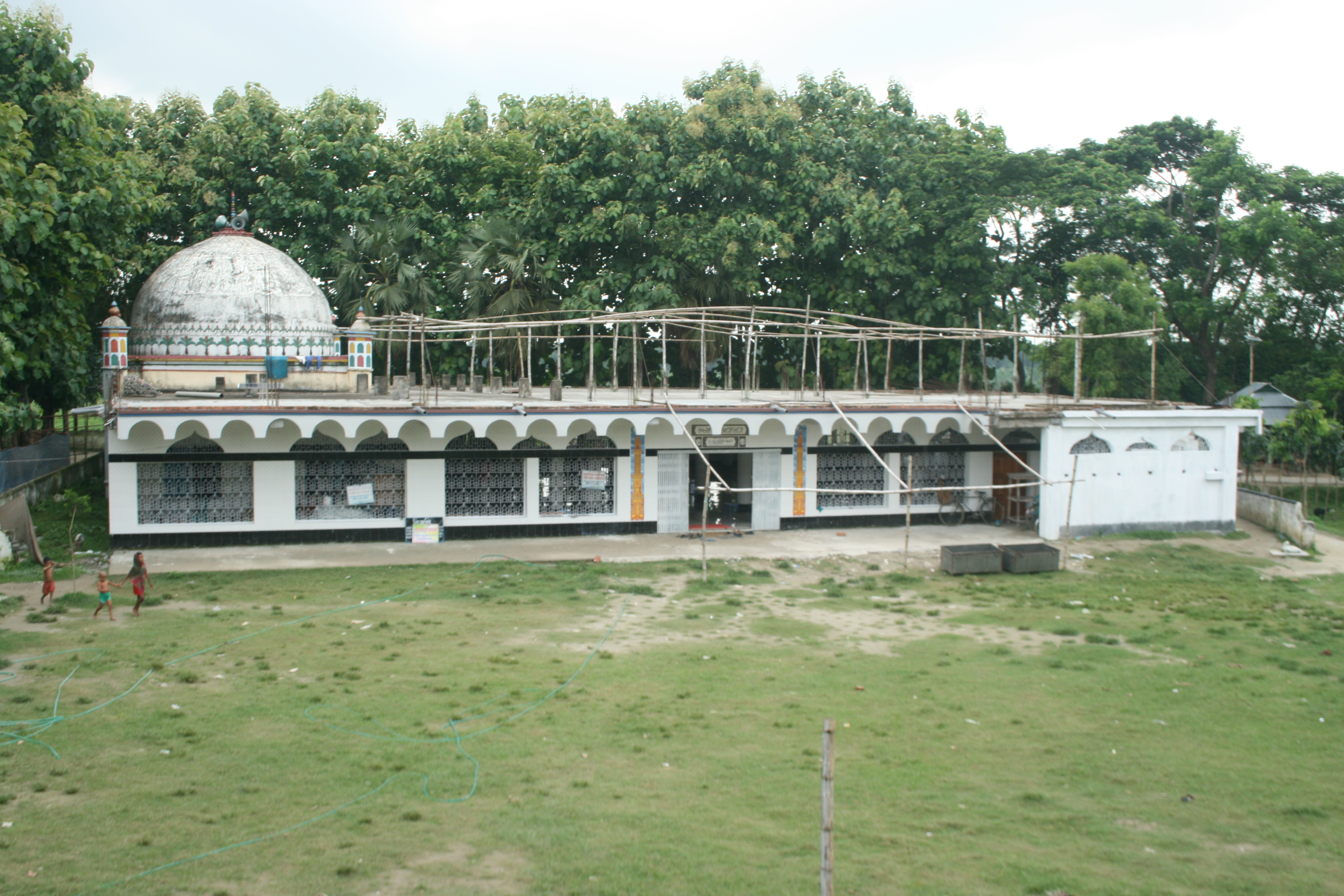
Sultanpur-Dargapara Shahi Jame Masjid in Tok

Historically home to Shishupala, the ruins of the ancient capital and reservoir can still be found today. Kapasia is filled with numerous medieval forts such as the Ekdala Fort, Dardaria Fort, Tok Fort and the Karnapur Fort. Out of the upazila's 594 mosques, some notable one include the Sultanpur-Dargapara Shahi Jame Masjid in Tok. The Raniganj Neelkuthi (indigo-house), dating back to the 1800s, and the Dak Bungalow of Lakhpur are both examples of colonial-era architecture. The Joradighi (a joint pair of reservoirs), the Dhadarchar (Shitalakshya-Brahmaputra confluence), Baniar Beel, Nail Beel, Machha Beel, Buri Beel, Suti canal and the Kamra EcoPark are popular natural tourist sites. Other tourist sites include the Faqir Majnu Shah Bridge, Angona Amusement Centre and the home of Tajuddin Ahmad, first Prime Minister of Bangladesh, in Durdaria.

== Administration ==
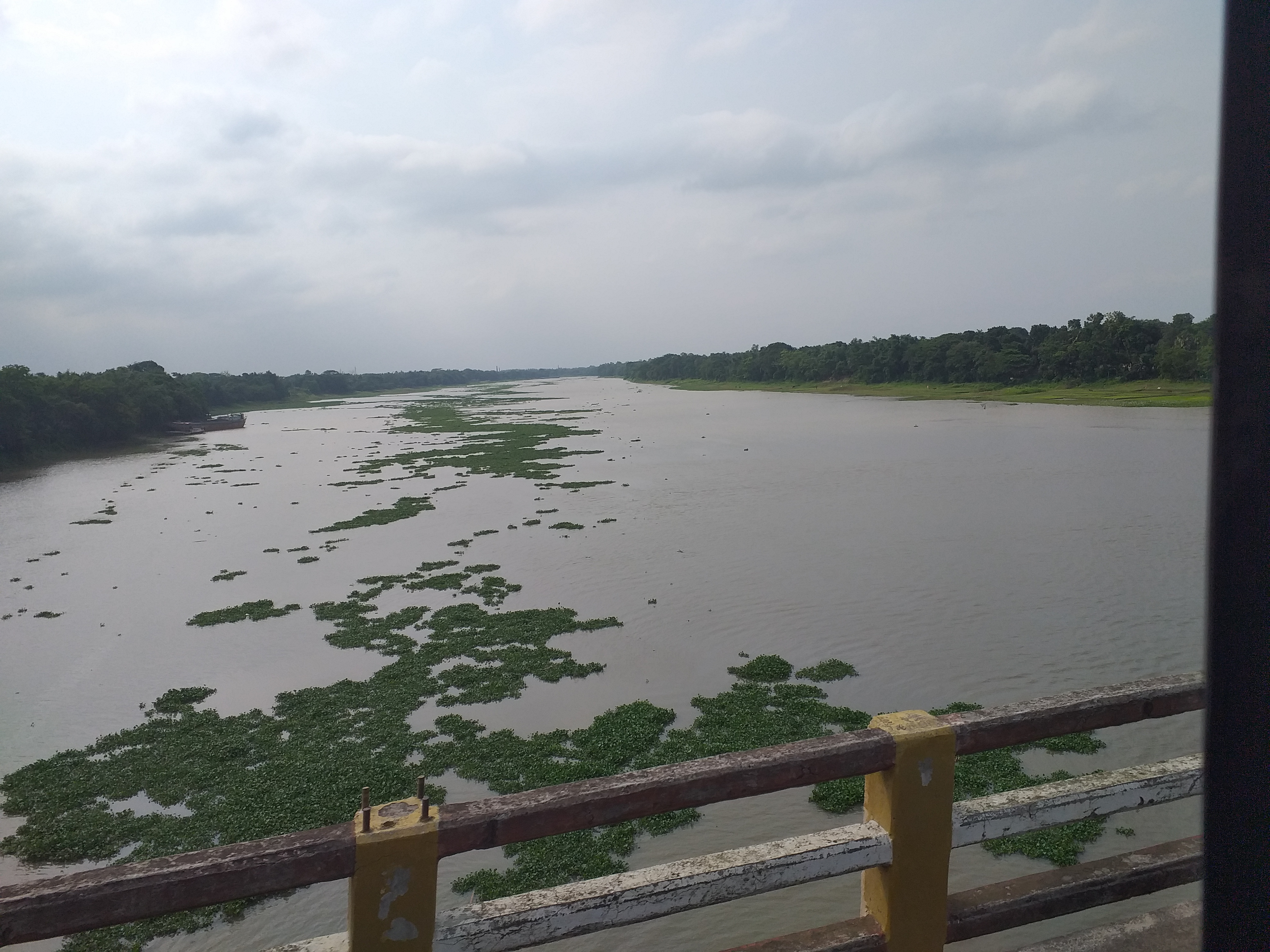
Kapasia Bridge

Kapasia Upazila is divided into 11 union parishads: Barishab, Chandpur, Durgapur, Ghagotia, Kapasia, Karihata, Rayed, Sonmania, Sinhasree, Targoan, and Tokh. The union parishads are subdivided into 81 mauzas and 172 villages.

== Notable people ==
- Tajuddin Ahmad, first prime minister of Bangladesh
- Fakir Abdul Mannan, lawyer and politician
- Simeen Hussain Rimi, politician
- Hannan Shah, army officer and politician
- Sohel Taj, politician

== See also ==
- Upazilas of Bangladesh
- Districts of Bangladesh
- Divisions of Bangladesh
