= Khatun (name) =

Khatun is a surname, name, and given name.

== As a surname ==
=== Politicians ===
- Sayeeda Khatun
- Hasima Khatun, Nepalese politician
- Shafia Khatun, Awami League politician
- Asma Khatun
- Halima Khatun (politician)
- Sahara Khatun
- Anwara Khatun
- Mafuja Khatun (born 1970), Indian politician
- Daulatunnessa Khatun
- Daulatunnesa Khatun
- Mahmuda Khatun
- Sultana Khatun
- Jainab Khatun, Nepalese politician
- Selima Khatun, Indian politician
- Jayeda Khatun, Bangladeshi politician
- Rashida Khatun

=== Athletes ===
- Mina Khatun, Bangladeshi cricketer
- Shorifa Khatun, Bangladeshi cricketer
- Fahima Khatun, Bangladeshi cricketer
- Sonia Khatun, Bangladeshi olympic swimmer
- Salma Khatun (born 1990), Bangladeshi cricketer
- Firoza Khatun, Bangladeshi sprinter
- Sakina Khatun, Indian powerlifter
- Murshida Khatun, Bangladeshi cricketer
- Akhi Khatun, Bangladeshi footballer

=== Academia ===
- Fahmida Khatun (economist), Bangladeshi economist
- Sanjida Khatun, Bangladeshi musicologist
- Maliha Khatun, Bangladeshi academic
- Shahla Khatun, Bangladeshi physician and National Professor
- Hafiza Khatun, Bangladeshi academic
- Sharifa Khatun, Bangladeshi academic

=== Activists ===
- Sufia Khatun (writer), Bangladeshi author and social activist
- Safia Khatun (language activist), activist with an important role in the 1952 Bengali language movement
- Muskan Khatun, Nepalese activist
- Halima Khatun, Bangladeshi activist, writer and academic with a role in the 1952 Bengali language movement
- Anoyara Khatun, Indian children's rights activist
- Masuda Khatun, Bengali feminist

=== Arts and entertainment ===
- Farha Khatun, Indian editor and documentary filmmaker who made the film Holy Rights
- Rabeya Khatun (1935–2021), Bangladeshi novelist
- Jahan Malek Khatun (c. 1324–c. 1393), Injuid poet and princess
- Azizunnessa Khatun, Bengali poet
- Khodeja Khatun, Bangladeshi writer

=== Other ===
- Sufia Khatun (disambiguation), multiple people
- Roquia Khatun
- Salma Khatun (train driver), the first female train driver in Bangladesh
- Kazi Khaleda Khatun
- Padishah Khatun (1256–1295), Qutlugh-Khanid dynasty ruler of Kirman
- Sayera Khatun, the mother of Sheikh Mujibur Rahman

== As a middle name ==
- Mahmuda Khatun Siddiqua
- Zobeda Khatun Parul

== As a given name ==
- Khatun Sapnara

== See also ==
- Khatun
- Khatun (disambiguation)
