= Khatun (disambiguation) =

Khatun may refer to:

== Places ==
- Beygjeh Khatun
- Tabriz Khatun
- Khatun Gonay
- Ana Khatun
- Cheshmeh Khatun
- Bagh Khatun
- Khatun Kandi
- Bibi Khatun, Kohgiluyeh and Boyer-Ahmad
- Chenar Khatun
- Sariyeh Khatun
- Bibi Khatun, Bushehr
- Negar Khatun
- Pol Khatun Rural District
- Khatun Mordeh
- Taj Khatun

== Other ==
- Al-Aman Bahela Khatun Mosque
- Rabeya Khatun Fiction Award
- Momuna Khatun Tomb
- Bardeh Rash-e Tabriz Khatun
- Khatun (surname)

== See also ==
- Khatun
