= Women in the Bengali language movement =

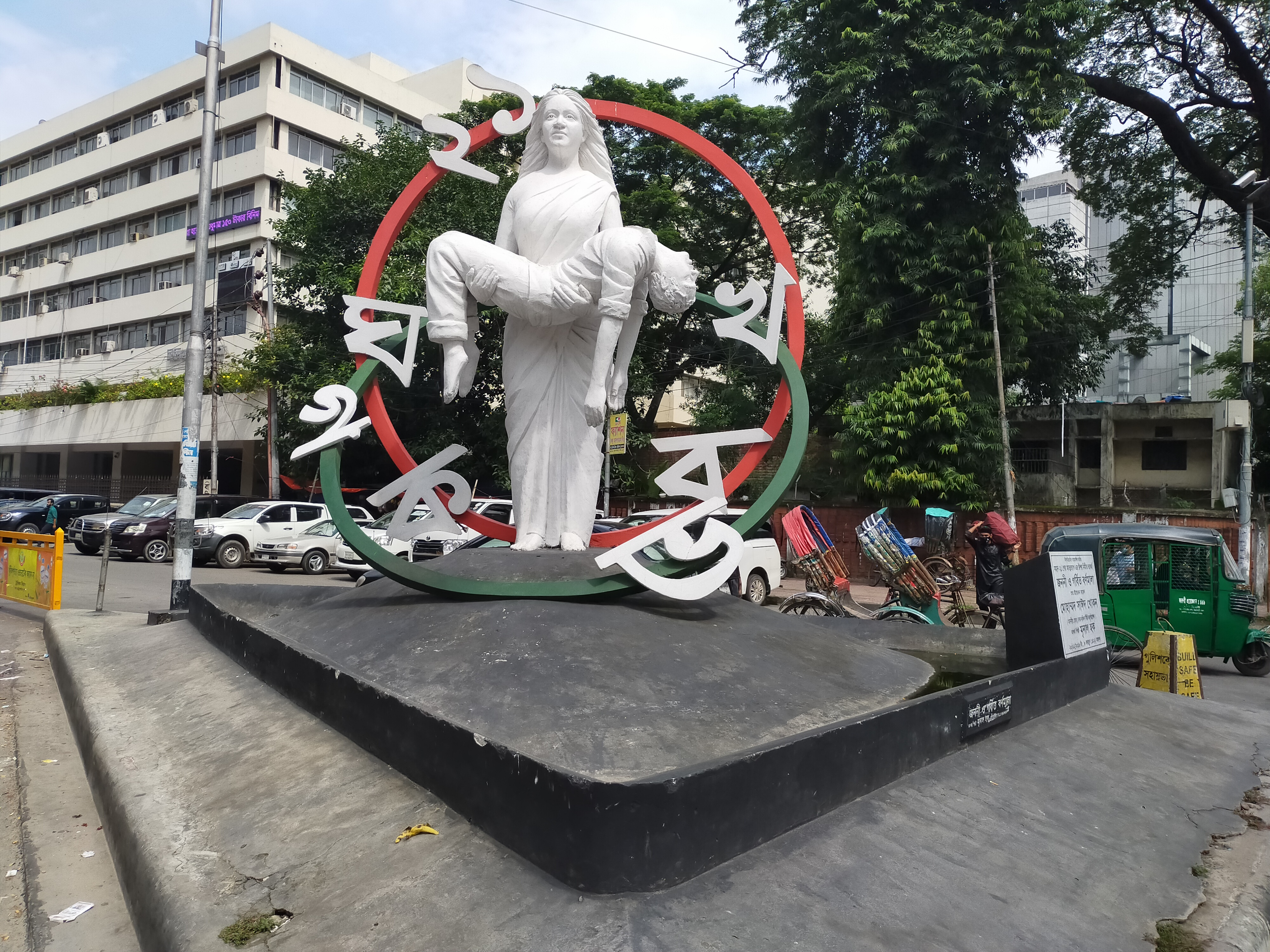
Janani O Gorbito Bornomala sculpture

Women played an important role in the Bengali language movement. During the movement that demanded that Bengali should be made as one of the state languages, female students stood beside their male counterparts as equals. Students of the University of Dhaka secretly painted posters with slogans advocating for the Bengali language.

On 21 February 1952, women played a critical role in breaking police barricades and confronting law enforcement officers. Female students of Dhaka Medical College provided medical care to the injured. Women went door to door raising funds for medical aid and participated in protests despite resistance from their families. Professor of History, Muntasir Mamun stated, "We must carefully preserve our history. The full recognition the brave men and women behind the 1952 Language Movement is yet to be completed".

== History ==
Rashtrabhasha Sangram Parishad (National Language Action Committee) was established in December 1947 to campaign for making Bengali one of the state languages of Pakistan. Muhammad Ali Jinnah had campaigned in East Pakistan for making Urdu the sole state language of Pakistan.

In his autobiography, Sheikh Mujibur Rahman mentioned: "From the early morning of March 11, hundreds of student activists began picketing at Eden College and other locations. At 8 a.m., when the police baton-charged the students near the post office, several female students were injured while resisting. At that time, Anwara Khatun and other female members of the Muslim League strongly protested against their party in the legislative assembly." Khatun was expelled from the Muslim League for participating in the Language movement.

Mujib further recalled that "while we were in prison for five days, schoolgirls from Muslim Girls' School would climb onto the rooftops at 10 a.m. and chant slogans like 'We want Bengali as the state language' and 'Free our imprisoned brothers' until 4 p.m. without exhaustion." Students from Kamrunnessa Government Girls High School, Anwara Begum Muslim Girls High School & College, and Banglabazar Govt Girls' High School participated in the movement.

From the inception to the culmination of the language movement, women played a crucial role. In August 1947, Professor Abul Kashem established Tamaddun Majlish to strengthen the demand for Bengali. Among the women involved were Kashem's wife Rahela, his sister Rahima, and his brother's wife Rokeya, who provided meals for activists in their Azimpur home. Women's groups like the Nari Sangbadik Kendra (Women's Journalist Centre) and Mahila Atmaraksha Samiti (Women's Defence Committee) played an important role in the Bengali language movement.

On January 23, 1952, at 4 a.m., Pakistani police surrounded Kashem's residence, where he and others were working on the publication of Sainik, a newspaper advocating for the movement. When the police attempted to enter, Rahela Kashem engaged in a prolonged argument with them, allowing Kashem and his associates to escape through the back wall.

=== Breaking Section 144 ===
On February 21, female activists were the first to break through police barricades, defying Section 144, which had been imposed to suppress protests. Rowshan Ara Bachchu and several other female students played a pivotal role in breaking these barricades. When the first two groups of ten protestors were arrested, students began jumping over and crawling under the barricades. Female students in the third group physically pulled the barricades apart, facing baton charges and tear gas injuries. Among the injured were Rawshan Ara Bachchu, Sara Taifur, Borqa Shamsun, Sufia Ibrahim, Suraiya Dolly, and Suraiya Hakim.

=== Outside Dhaka ===
Women outside Dhaka also faced police brutality for their involvement. Among them, Mamtaz Begum, head teacher of Morgan School in Narayanganj, was imprisoned, and under government pressure, her husband divorced her and took their daughter with him. Her students Ila Bakshi, Benu Dhar, and Shabani, all teenagers, were arrested by the police. In Sylhet, Saleha Begum was expelled from school for three years for hoisting a black flag in memory of the language martyrs.

In Chittagong, prominent activists included Tohfatunnesa Azim, Syeda Halima, Sultana Begum, Nurunnahar Jahur, Ainun Nahar, and Anwara Mahfuz. In Khulna, women involved in Tamaddun Majlis, such as Anwara Begum and Sajeda Ali, played an active role. In Rangpur, women such as Nilufa Ahmed, Begum Maleka Ashraf, and Aftabunnesa led protests against firing from police. Zobeda Khatun Chowdhurani led a delegation of girls from Sylhet demanding recognition of the Bengali Language from Prime Minister Khawaja Nazimuddin. Women college students protested in Khulna, Satkhira, Tangail, and Rajshahi.

Chemon Ara mentioned that Anwara Khatun, a member of the provincial council and a leader of the 1952 Language Struggle Council, was an integral part of the movement outside Dhaka. Other notable contributors were Begum Daulatunnesa from Gaibandha, Nadera Begum, Lily Haque, Hamida Khatun, Nurjahan Morshed, Afsari Khanam, and Ranu Mukherjee. In Rajshahi, key figures included Dr. Jahanara Begum Benu, Monowara Begum Benu, Dr. Mohsena Begum, Feroza Begum Funu, and Hafiza Begum Tuku.

== Arrests ==
On 21 February 1955, the largest crackdown on female activists took place, with 21 female students of the University of Dhaka arrested for violating Section 144. Among them were Laila Nur, Pratibha Mutsuddi, Farida Bari, Jaharat Ara, Kamrun Nahar Laily, Hosne Ara, Farida Anwar, and Taleya Rahman.

== Notable activists ==
- Halima Khatun
- Anwara Khatun
- Laila Nur
- Rawshan Ara Bachchu
- Sufia Kamal
- Shafia Khatun
