= International cricket in 2008–09 =

Cricket season

The 2008–09 international cricket season was between September 2008 and March 2009. The season saw the security concerns for cricket in Pakistan reach a pinnacle. The ICC Champions Trophy, scheduled to be held in Pakistan in September 2008, was postponed to 2009 after five of the participating nations refused to send their teams for the event. In November 2008, a Pakistani militant group launched terror attacks in Mumbai. This led to India cancelling their tour of Pakistan originally scheduled for January and February 2009. Sri Lanka agreed to tour Pakistan in place of India. However, the tour was jeopardised by a terror attack in Lahore where gunmen fired at a bus carrying the Sri Lankan team, injuring six team members. The Champions Trophy was later relocated to South Africa. No international cricket were played in Pakistan for more than five years. This period of isolation ended when Zimbabwe toured Pakistan in May 2015. After successfully hosting a few T20Is against World-XI, the Sri Lanka cricket team and the West Indians from 2017 to 2018, a few matches of the Pakistan Super League from 2017 to 2019, the whole season in 2020 as well as hosting complete tours against Sri Lankan and Bangladeshi cricket teams respectively during the 2019–20 season, built a good reputation of Pakistan. Hence, by the end of 2019, the Pakistan Cricket Board, announced that they would no longer play any of their future home matches at a neutral venue, indicating that International Cricket has returned to the country on full-time basis.

== Season overview ==
International tours
Start date	Home team	Away team	Results [Matches]		
Start date	Home team	Away team	Test	ODI	T20I
9 October 2008	India	Australia	2–0 [4]	—	—
9 October 2008	Bangladesh	New Zealand	0–1 [2]	1–2 [3]	—
31 October 2008	South Africa	Kenya	—	2–0 [2]	—
5 November 2008	South Africa	Bangladesh	2–0 [2]	2–0 [3]	1–0 [1]
12 November 2008	Pakistan	West Indies	—	3–0 [3]	—
14 November 2008	India	England	1–0 [2]	5–0 [5]	—
20 November 2008	Australia	New Zealand	2–0 [2]	2–2 [5]	1–0 [1]
20 November 2008	Zimbabwe	Sri Lanka	—	0–5 [5]	—
11 December 2008	New Zealand	West Indies	0–0 [2]	2–1 [5]	1–0 [2]
17 December 2008	Australia	South Africa	1–2 [3]	1–4 [5]	2–0 [2]
26 December 2008	Bangladesh	Sri Lanka	0–2 [2]	—	—
19 January 2009	Bangladesh	Zimbabwe	—	2–1 [3]	—
20 January 2009	Pakistan	Sri Lanka	0–0 [1]	1–2 [3]	—
27 January 2009	Kenya	Zimbabwe	—	0–5 [5]	—
28 January 2009	Sri Lanka	India	—	1–4 [5]	0–1 [1]
4 February 2009	West Indies	England	1–0 [5]	2–3 [5]	1–0 [1]
26 February 2009	South Africa	Australia	1–2 [3]	3–2 [5]	2–0 [2]
25 February 2009	New Zealand	India	0–1 [3]	1–3 [5]	2–0 [2]
International tournaments
Start date	Tournament			Winners	
10 October 2008	(Canada) Quadrangular Twenty20 Series			Sri Lanka	
10 January 2009	(Bangladesh) Tri-Series	Sri Lanka			
6 February 2009	(Bangladesh) Women's Tri-Series	Sri Lanka			
Minor tournaments
Start date	Tournament			Winners	
30 October 2008	(South Africa) ICC Intercontinental Cup Final			Ireland	
4 October 2008	(Tanzania) ICC World Cricket League Division Four			Afghanistan	
17 October 2008	(Kenya) Associates Tri-Series			Zimbabwe	
25 November 2008	(United States) ICC Americas Championship			United States	
24 January 2009	(Argentina) ICC World Cricket League Division Three			Afghanistan	

== Pre-season rankings ==
ICC Test Championship 1 August 2008
Rank	Team	Matches	Points	Rating
1	Australia	26	3597	118
2	India	27	3082	115
3	South Africa	30	3394	113
4	England	31	3274	104
5	Sri Lanka	23	2364	103
6	Pakistan	19	1905	100
7	New Zealand	21	1738	83
8	West Indies	22	1791	81
9	Bangladesh	14	0	0
Reference: ICC Official Rankings List, 1 August 2008

ICC ODI Championship 31 August 2008
Rank	Team	Matches	Points	Rating
1	Australia	26	3378	130
2	South Africa	25	2938	118
3	England	27	3142	116
4	New Zealand	21	2443	116
5	India	36	4051	113
6	Pakistan	25	2752	110
7	Sri Lanka	27	2838	105
8	West Indies	21	1994	95
9	Bangladesh	25	1138	46
10	Ireland	8	174	22
11	Zimbabwe	15	237	16
12	Kenya	3	0	0
Reference: ICC Official Rankings List, 31 August 2008

== September ==
=== ICC Intercontinental Cup ===
Team	Pts	Pld	W	L	D	FI	A
Namibia	108	7	6	1	0	4	0
Ireland	106	7	5	0	2	5	0
Kenya	96	7	4	2	0	5	1
Scotland	82	7	3	1	2	4	1
Netherlands	48	7	3	4	0	1	0
United Arab Emirates	29	7	1	5	1	2	0
Canada	29	7	1	5	1	2	0
Bermuda	26	7	1	6	0	2	0

- Win – 14 points
- Draw if more than 8 hours of play lost – 3 points (otherwise 0 points)
- First Innings leader – 6 points (independent of final result)
- Abandoned without a ball played – 10 points.

No.	Date	Team 1	Captain 1	Team 2	Captain 2	Venue	Result
First-class	3–6 September	Bermuda	Irving Romaine	Namibia	Louis Burger	National Stadium, Hamilton	Namibia by 103 runs
First-class	3–6 October	Namibia	Louis Burger	Ireland	William Porterfield	Wanderers Cricket Ground, Windhoek	Ireland by 8 runs
First-class	11–14 October	Kenya	Steve Tikolo	Ireland	William Porterfield	Nairobi Gymkhana Club, Nairobi	Ireland by innings and 65 runs
Final
First-class	30 October–2 November	Namibia	Louis Burger	Ireland	William Porterfield	St George's Park, Port Elizabeth	Ireland by 9 wickets

Note: For matches in previous seasons, see the main article

== October ==
=== World Cricket League Division 4 ===
Pos	Team	Pld	W	L	T	NR	Pts	NRR
1	Afghanistan	5	5	0	0	0	10	1.329
2	Hong Kong	5	4	1	0	0	8	1.672
3	Italy	5	3	2	0	0	6	0.907
4	Tanzania	5	1	4	0	0	2	−0.658
5	Jersey	5	1	4	0	0	2	−0.912
6	Fiji	5	1	4	0	0	2	−2.385

Group stage
No.	Date	Team 1	Captain 1	Team 2	Captain 2	Venue	Result
1st Match	4 October	Afghanistan	Nowroz Mangal	Fiji	Colin Rika	Kinondoni Ground, Dar es Salaam	Afghanistan by 80 runs
2nd Match	4 October	Hong Kong	Tabarak Dar	Italy	Joe Scuderi	University of Dar es Salaam Ground, Dar es Salaam	Hong Kong by 46 runs
3rd Match	4 October	Tanzania	Hamisi Abdallah	Jersey	Mathew Hague	Annil Burhani Ground, Dar es Salaam	Tanzania by 34 runs
4th Match	5 October	Afghanistan	Nowroz Mangal	Jersey	Mathew Hague	University of Dar es Salaam Ground, Dar es Salaam	Afghanistan by 122 runs
5th Match	5 October	Fiji	Colin Rika	Italy	Joe Scuderi	Annil Burhani Ground, Dar es Salaam	Italy by 254 runs
6th Match	5 October	Tanzania	Hamisi Abdallah	Hong Kong	Tabarak Dar	Kinondoni Ground, Dar es Salaam	Hong Kong by 134 runs
7th Match	7 October	Fiji	Colin Rika	Hong Kong	Tabarak Dar	University of Dar es Salaam Ground, Dar es Salaam	Hong Kong by 129 runs
8th Match	7 October	Italy	Joe Scuderi	Jersey	Mathew Hague	Kinondoni Ground, Dar es Salaam	Italy by 29 runs (D/L)
9th Match	7 October	Tanzania	Hamisi Abdallah	Afghanistan	Nowroz Mangal	Annil Burhani Ground, Dar es Salaam	Afghanistan by 8 runs (D/L)
10th Match	8 October	Afghanistan	Nowroz Mangal	Hong Kong	Tabarak Dar	Annil Burhani Ground, Dar es Salaam	Afghanistan by 4 wickets
11th Match	8 October	Fiji	Colin Rika	Jersey	Mathew Hague	Kinondoni Ground, Dar es Salaam	Jersey by 79 runs
12th Match	8 October	Tanzania	Hamisi Abdallah	Italy	Joe Scuderi	University of Dar es Salaam Ground, Dar es Salaam	No result
Replay of 12th Match	9 October	Tanzania	Hamisi Abdallah	Italy	Joe Scuderi	University of Dar es Salaam Ground, Dar es Salaam	Italy by 9 wickets
13th Match	10 October	Afghanistan	Nowroz Mangal	Italy	Joe Scuderi	Kinondoni Ground, Dar es Salaam	Afghanistan 93 runs
14th Match	10 October	Hong Kong	Tabarak Dar	Jersey	Mathew Hague	Annil Burhani Ground, Dar es Salaam	Hong Kong by 100 runs
15th Match	10 October	Tanzania	Hamisi Abdallah	Fiji	Colin Rika	University of Dar es Salaam Ground, Dar es Salaam	Fiji by 4 runs

Playoff matches
No.	Date	Team 1	Captain 1	Team 2	Captain 2	Venue	Result
1st Place Playoff	11 October	Afghanistan	Nowroz Mangal	Hong Kong	Tabarak Dar	University of Dar es Salaam Ground, Dar es Salaam	Afghanistan by 57 runs
3rd Place Playoff	11 October	Italy	Nicholas Northcote	Tanzania	Hamisi Abdallah	Annil Burhani Ground, Dar es Salaam	Italy by 70 runs
5th Place Playoff	11 October	Fiji	Colin Rika	Jersey	Mathew Hague	Kinondoni Ground, Dar es Salaam	Fiji by 27 runs

==== Final Placings ====
Pos	Team	Promotion/Relegation
1st	Afghanistan	Promoted to Global Division Three for 2009
2nd	Hong Kong	Promoted to Global Division Three for 2009
3rd	Italy	Remained in Global Division Four for 2010
4th	Tanzania	Remained in Global Division Four for 2010
5th	Fiji	Relegated to Global Division Five for 2010
6th	Jersey	Relegated to Global Division Five for 2010

=== Australia in India ===
Test series
No.	Date	Home captain	Away captain	Venue	Result
Test 1887	9–13 October	Anil Kumble	Ricky Ponting	M. Chinnaswamy Stadium, Bangalore	Match drawn
Test 1889	17–21 October	Mahendra Singh Dhoni	Ricky Ponting	Punjab Cricket Association Stadium, Mohali	India by 320 runs
Test 1891	29 October–2 November	Anil Kumble	Ricky Ponting	Feroz Shah Kotla Ground, Delhi	Match drawn
Test 1892	6–10 November	Mahendra Singh Dhoni	Ricky Ponting	Vidarbha Cricket Association Stadium, Nagpur	India by 172 runs

=== New Zealand in Bangladesh ===
No.	Date	Home captain	Away captain	Venue	Result
ODI series
ODI 2763	9 October	Mohammad Ashraful	Daniel Vettori	Sher-e-Bangla National Stadium, Mirpur	Bangladesh by 7 wickets
ODI 2764	11 October	Mohammad Ashraful	Daniel Vettori	Sher-e-Bangla National Stadium, Mirpur	New Zealand by 75 runs
ODI 2765	14 October	Mohammad Ashraful	Daniel Vettori	Chittagong Divisional Stadium, Chittagong	New Zealand by 79 runs
Test series
Test 1888	17–21 October	Mohammad Ashraful	Daniel Vettori	Chittagong Divisional Stadium, Chittagong	New Zealand by 3 wickets
Test 1890	25–29 October	Mohammad Ashraful	Daniel Vettori	Sher-e-Bangla National Stadium, Mirpur	Match drawn

=== Quadrangular Twenty20 Series in Canada ===
Pos	Team	Pld	W	L	T	NR	Pts	NRR
1	Pakistan	3	3	0	0	0	6	0.828
2	Sri Lanka	3	2	1	0	0	4	0.315
3	Zimbabwe	3	1	2	0	0	2	−0.295
4	Canada	3	0	3	0	0	0	−0.833

No.	Date	Team 1	Captain 1	Team 2	Captain 2	Venue	Result
Group stage
T20I 69	10 October	Sri Lanka	Mahela Jayawardene	Zimbabwe	Prosper Utseya	Maple Leaf North-West Ground, King City	Sri Lanka by 5 wickets
T20I 70	10 October	Canada	Sunil Dhaniram	Pakistan	Shoaib Malik	Maple Leaf North-West Ground, King City	Pakistan by 35 runs
T20I 71	11 October	Canada	Sunil Dhaniram	Zimbabwe	Prosper Utseya	Maple Leaf North-West Ground, King City	Match tied; Zimbabwe won bowl-off
T20I 72	11 October	Sri Lanka	Tillakaratne Dilshan	Pakistan	Shoaib Malik	Maple Leaf North-West Ground, King City	Pakistan by 3 wickets
T20I 73	12 October	Pakistan	Shoaib Malik	Zimbabwe	Prosper Utseya	Maple Leaf North-West Ground, King City	Pakistan by 7 wickets
T20I 74	12 October	Canada	Sunil Dhaniram	Sri Lanka	Mahela Jayawardene	Maple Leaf North-West Ground, King City	Sri Lanka by 15 runs
Third place playoff
T20I 75	13 October	Zimbabwe	Prosper Utseya	Canada	Sunil Dhaniram	Maple Leaf North-West Ground, King City	Zimbabwe by 109 runs
Final
T20I 76	13 October	Pakistan	Shoaib Malik	Sri Lanka	Mahela Jayawardene	Maple Leaf North-West Ground, King City	Sri Lanka by 5 wickets

=== Associates Tri-Series in Kenya ===
Pos	Team	Pld	W	L	NR	Pts	NRR
1	Zimbabwe	4	1	1	2	9	0.610
2	Kenya	4	1	1	2	9	0.093
3	Ireland	4	1	1	2	9	−0.722

Group stage
No.	Date	Team 1	Captain 1	Team 2	Captain 2	Venue	Result
ODI 2766	17 October	Ireland	William Porterfield	Zimbabwe	Prosper Utseya	Gymkhana Club Ground, Nairobi	Zimbabwe by 156 runs
ODI 2767	18 October	Kenya	Steve Tikolo	Ireland	William Porterfield	Gymkhana Club Ground, Nairobi	Ireland by 86 runs
ODI 2768	19 October	Kenya	Steve Tikolo	Zimbabwe	Prosper Utseya	Gymkhana Club Ground, Nairobi	Kenya by 95 runs
ODI 2768a	21 October	Ireland	William Porterfield	Zimbabwe	Prosper Utseya	Gymkhana Club Ground, Nairobi	No result
ODI 2768b	22 October	Kenya	Steve Tikolo	Ireland	William Porterfield	Gymkhana Club Ground, Nairobi	No result
ODI 2768c	23 October	Kenya	Steve Tikolo	Zimbabwe	Prosper Utseya	Gymkhana Club Ground, Nairobi	No result
Final
No.	Date	Team 1	Captain 1	Team 2	Captain 2	Venue	Result
ODI 2768d	25 October	Zimbabwe	Prosper Utseya	Kenya	Steve Tikolo	Gymkhana Club Ground, Nairobi	No result

=== Kenya in South Africa ===
No.	Date	Home captain	Away captain	Venue	Result
ODI series
ODI 2769	31 October	Johan Botha	Steve Tikolo	OUTsurance Oval, Bloemfontein	South Africa by 159 runs
ODI 2770	2 November	Johan Botha	Steve Tikolo	De Beers Diamond Oval, Kimberley	South Africa by 7 wickets

== November ==
=== Bangladesh in South Africa ===
No.	Date	Home captain	Away captain	Venue	Result
Only T20I
T20I 77	5 November	Johan Botha	Mohammad Ashraful	New Wanderers Stadium, Johannesburg	South Africa by 12 runs (D/L)
ODI series
ODI 2771	7 November	Johan Botha	Mohammad Ashraful	Senwes Park, Potchefstroom	South Africa by 61 runs
ODI 2772	9 November	Graeme Smith	Mohammad Ashraful	Willowmoore Park, Benoni	South Africa by 128 runs
ODI 2773a	12 November	Graeme Smith	Mohammad Ashraful	Buffalo Park, East London	No result
Test series
Test 1893	19–23 November	Graeme Smith	Mohammad Ashraful	OUTsurance Oval, Bloemfontein	South Africa by an innings and 129 runs
Test 1895	26–30 November	Graeme Smith	Mohammad Ashraful	SuperSport Park, Centurion	South Africa by an innings and 48 runs

=== Pakistan vs West Indies in the United Arab Emirates ===
No.	Date	Home captain	Away captain	Venue	Result
ODI series
ODI 2773	12 November	Shoaib Malik	Chris Gayle	Sheikh Zayed Cricket Stadium, Abu Dhabi	Pakistan by 4 wickets
ODI 2775	14 November	Shoaib Malik	Chris Gayle	Sheikh Zayed Cricket Stadium, Abu Dhabi	Pakistan by 24 runs
ODI 2776	16 November	Shoaib Malik	Chris Gayle	Sheikh Zayed Cricket Stadium, Abu Dhabi	Pakistan by 31 runs

=== England in India ===
No.	Date	Home captain	Away captain	Venue	Result
ODI series
ODI 2774	14 November	Mahendra Dhoni	Kevin Pietersen	Madhavrao Scindia Cricket Ground, Rajkot	India by 158 runs
ODI 2777	17 November	Mahendra Dhoni	Kevin Pietersen	Maharani Usharaje Trust Cricket Ground, Indore	India by 54 runs
ODI 2778	20 November	Mahendra Dhoni	Kevin Pietersen	Green Park Stadium, Kanpur	India by 16 runs (D/L)
ODI 2781	23 November	Mahendra Dhoni	Kevin Pietersen	M Chinnaswamy Stadium, Bangalore	India by 19 runs (D/L)
ODI 2783	26 November	Mahendra Dhoni	Kevin Pietersen	Barabati Stadium, Cuttack	India by 6 wickets
Test series
Test 1898	11–15 December	Mahendra Dhoni	Kevin Pietersen	MA Chidambaram Stadium, Chennai	India by 6 wickets
Test 1901	19–23 December	Mahendra Dhoni	Kevin Pietersen	Punjab Cricket Association Stadium, Mohali	Match drawn

- 2 further ODIs were scheduled for Guwahati (29 November) and Delhi (2 December) but were cancelled for security reasons following the 2008 Mumbai Terrorist Attacks. The 1st Test was moved from Ahmedabad to Chennai and the 2nd Test from Mumbai to Mohali. After initially flying home, England flew out to Abu Dhabi on 4 December for a training camp, before then returning to India for the test series.

=== New Zealand in Australia ===
No.	Date	Home Captain	Away Captain	Venue	Result
Test series
Test 1894	20–24 November	Ricky Ponting	Daniel Vettori	The Gabba, Brisbane	Australia by 149 runs
Test 1896	28 November – 2 December	Ricky Ponting	Daniel Vettori	Adelaide Oval, Adelaide	Australia by an innings and 62 runs
ODI series
ODI 2811	1 February	Ricky Ponting	Daniel Vettori	WACA Ground, Perth	New Zealand by 2 wickets
ODI 2816	6 February	Michael Clarke	Daniel Vettori	Melbourne Cricket Ground, Melbourne	New Zealand by 6 wickets
ODI 2817	8 February	Ricky Ponting	Daniel Vettori	Sydney Cricket Ground, Sydney	Australia by 32 runs
ODI 2819	10 February	Ricky Ponting	Daniel Vettori	Adelaide Oval, Adelaide	Australia by 6 wickets
ODI 2820	13 February	Ricky Ponting	Daniel Vettori	The Gabba, Brisbane	No result
Only T20I
T20I 83	15 February	Brad Haddin	Daniel Vettori	Sydney Cricket Ground, Sydney	Australia by 1 run

=== Sri Lanka in Zimbabwe ===
No.	Date	Home Captain	Away Captain	Venue	Result
ODI series
ODI 2779	20 November	Prosper Utseya	Kumar Sangakkara	Harare Sports Club, Harare	Sri Lanka by 6 wickets
ODI 2780	22 November	Prosper Utseya	Kumar Sangakkara	Harare Sports Club, Harare	Sri Lanka by 9 wickets
ODI 2782	24 November	Prosper Utseya	Mahela Jayawardene	Harare Sports Club, Harare	Sri Lanka by 5 runs
ODI 2784	28 November	Prosper Utseya	Mahela Jayawardene	Harare Sports Club, Harare	Sri Lanka by 2 wickets
ODI 2785	30 November	Prosper Utseya	Mahela Jayawardene	Harare Sports Club, Harare	Sri Lanka by 19 runs

=== ICC Americas Division 1 Championship ===
The ICC Americas Division 1 Championship took place Fort Lauderdale in Florida from 25 November. Six nations took part: hosts USA, holders Bermuda, Canada, Cayman Islands, Argentina and debutants Suriname. United States won the tournament.

Pos	Team	Pld	W	L	T	NR	Pts	NRR
1	United States	5	5	0	0	0	20	2.822
2	Bermuda	5	3	1	0	1	14	1.785
3	Canada	5	3	1	0	1	14	1.714
4	Cayman Islands	5	2	3	0	0	8	−0.719
5	Argentina	5	1	4	0	0	4	−1.253
6	Suriname	5	0	5	0	0	0	−3.698

No.	Date	Team 1	Captain 1	Team 2	Captain 2	Venue	Result
Match 1	25 November	Argentina	Esteban MacDermott	Canada	Umar Bhatti	Brian Piccolo Park, Fort Lauderdale	Canada by 1 wicket
Match 2	25 November	Bermuda	Irving Romaine	Cayman Islands	Pearson Best	Central Broward Regional Park, Fort Lauderdale	Bermuda by 73 runs
Match 3	25 November	United States	Steve Massiah	Suriname	Deoraj Sewanan	Central Broward Regional Park Artificial Ground, Fort Lauderdale	United States by 305 runs
Match 4	26 November	Bermuda	Irving Romaine	Suriname	Deoraj Sewanan	Central Broward Regional Park, Fort Lauderdale	Bermuda by 224 runs
Match 5	26 November	Canada	Umar Bhatti	Cayman Islands	Pearson Best	Central Broward Regional Park Artificial Ground, Fort Lauderdale	Canada by 206 runs
Match 6	26 November	Argentina	Esteban MacDermott	United States	Steve Massiah	Brian Piccolo Park, Fort Lauderdale	United States by 7 wickets
Match 7	27 November	Cayman Islands	Pearson Best	Argentina	Esteban MacDermott	Central Broward Regional Park, Fort Lauderdale	Cayman Islands by 108 runs
Match 8	27 November	Canada	Umar Bhatti	Suriname	Deoraj Sewanan	Central Broward Regional Park Artificial Ground, Fort Lauderdale	Canada by 206 runs
Match 9	27 November	United States	Steve Massiah	Bermuda	Irving Romaine	Brian Piccolo Park, Fort Lauderdale	United States by 86 runs
Match 10	29 November	Bermuda	Irving Romaine	Argentina	Esteban MacDermott	Central Browards Regional Park Artificial Ground, Fort Lauderdale	Bermuda by 146 runs
Match 11	29 November	Suriname	Deoraj Sewanan	Cayman Islands	Pearson Best	Brian Piccolo Park, Fort Lauderdale	Cayman Islands by 8 wickets
Match 12	29 November	United States	Steve Massiah	Canada	Umar Bhatti	Central Broward Regional Park, Fort Lauderdale	United States by 81 runs
Match 13	30 November	Suriname	Deoraj Sewanan	Argentina	Esteban MacDermott	Central Broward Regional Park Artificial Ground, Fort Lauderdale	Argentina by 6 wickets
Match 14	30 November	Canada	Umar Bhatti	Bermuda	Irving Romaine	Central Broward Regional Park, Fort Lauderdale	No result
Match 15	30 November	United States	Steve Massiah	Cayman Islands	Pearson Best	Brian Piccolo Park, Fort Lauderdale	United States by 87 runs (D/L)

== December ==
=== West Indies in New Zealand ===
No.	Date	Home Captain	Away Captain	Venue	Result
Test series
Test 1897	11–15 December	Daniel Vettori	Chris Gayle	University Oval, Dunedin	Match drawn
Test 1900	19–23 December	Daniel Vettori	Chris Gayle	McLean Park, Napier	Match drawn
T20I series
T20I 78	26 December	Daniel Vettori	Chris Gayle	Eden Park, Auckland	Match tied; West Indies won by Super Over
T20I 79	28 December	Daniel Vettori	Chris Gayle	Seddon Park, Hamilton	New Zealand by 36 runs
ODI series
ODI 2786	31 December	Daniel Vettori	Chris Gayle	Queenstown Events Centre, Queenstown	No result
ODI 2787	3 January	Daniel Vettori	Chris Gayle	AMI Stadium, Christchurch	West Indies by 5 wickets (D/L)
ODI 2788	7 January	Daniel Vettori	Chris Gayle	Westpac Stadium, Wellington	New Zealand by 7 wickets
ODI 2789	10 January	Daniel Vettori	Chris Gayle	Eden Park, Auckland	No result
ODI 2792	13 January	Daniel Vettori	Chris Gayle	McLean Park, Napier	New Zealand by 9 runs (D/L)

=== South Africa in Australia ===
No.	Date	Home Captain	Away Captain	Venue	Result
Test series
Test 1899	17–21 December	Ricky Ponting	Graeme Smith	WACA Ground, Perth	South Africa by 6 wickets
Test 1902	26–30 December	Ricky Ponting	Graeme Smith	Melbourne Cricket Ground, Melbourne	South Africa by 9 wickets
Test 1904	3–7 January	Ricky Ponting	Graeme Smith	Sydney Cricket Ground, Sydney	Australia by 103 runs
T20I series
T20I 80	11 January	Ricky Ponting	Johan Botha	Melbourne Cricket Ground, Melbourne	Australia by 52 runs
T20I 81	13 January	Ricky Ponting	Johan Botha	The Gabba, Brisbane	Australia by 6 wickets
ODI series
ODI 2795	16 January	Ricky Ponting	Johan Botha	Melbourne Cricket Ground, Melbourne	South Africa by 3 wickets
ODI 2796	18 January	Ricky Ponting	Johan Botha	Bellerive Oval, Hobart	Australia by 5 runs
ODI 2802	23 January	Ricky Ponting	Johan Botha	Sydney Cricket Ground, Sydney	South Africa by 3 wickets
ODI 2804	26 January	Ricky Ponting	Johan Botha	Adelaide Oval, Adelaide	South Africa by 8 wickets
ODI 2808	30 January	Ricky Ponting	Johan Botha	WACA Ground, Perth	South Africa by 39 runs

=== Sri Lanka in Bangladesh ===
No.	Date	Home Captain	Away Captain	Venue	Result
Test 1903	26–31 December	Mohammad Ashraful	Mahela Jayawardene	Sher-e-Bangla National Stadium, Mirpur	Sri Lanka by 107 runs
Test 1905	3–7 January	Mohammad Ashraful	Mahela Jayawardene	Chittagong Divisional Stadium, Chittagong	Sri Lanka by 465 runs

- The first test included a rest day on 29 December due to the Bangladeshi general elections.

== January ==
=== Tri-Series in Bangladesh ===
Group Stage
Pos	Team	Pld	W	L	T	NR	BP	Pts	NRR	For	Against
1	Sri Lanka	2	1	1	0	0	1	5	1.279	357/81	231/73.5
2	Bangladesh	2	1	1	0	0	1	5	−0.039	318/73.5	352/81
3	Zimbabwe	2	1	1	0	0	0	4	−0.920	285/100	377/100

Source: ESPNcricinfo

No.	Date	Team 1	Captain 1	Team 2	Captain 2	Venue	Result
ODI 2790	10 January	Bangladesh	Mohammad Ashraful	Zimbabwe	Prosper Utseya	Sher-e-Bangla National Stadium, Mirpur	Zimbabwe by 38 runs
ODI 2791	12 January	Sri Lanka	Mahela Jayawardene	Zimbabwe	Prosper Utseya	Sher-e-Bangla National Stadium, Mirpur	Sri Lanka by 130 runs
ODI 2793	14 January	Sri Lanka	Mahela Jayawardene	Bangladesh	Mohammad Ashraful	Sher-e-Bangla National Stadium, Mirpur	Bangladesh by 5 wickets
ODI 2794	16 January	Bangladesh	Mohammad Ashraful	Sri Lanka	Mahela Jayawardene	Sher-e-Bangla National Stadium, Mirpur	Sri Lanka by 2 wickets

=== Zimbabwe in Bangladesh ===
No.	Date	Home Captain	Away Captain	Venue	Result
ODI 2797	19 January	Mohammad Ashraful	Prosper Utseya	Sher-e-Bangla National Stadium, Mirpur	Zimbabwe by 2 wickets
ODI 2799	21 January	Mohammad Ashraful	Prosper Utseya	Sher-e-Bangla National Stadium, Mirpur	Bangladesh by 6 wickets
ODI 2801	23 January	Mohammad Ashraful	Prosper Utseya	Sher-e-Bangla National Stadium, Mirpur	Bangladesh by 6 wickets

=== Sri Lanka in Pakistan ===
No.	Date	Home captain	Away captain	Venue	Result
ODI series
ODI 2798	20 January	Shoaib Malik	Mahela Jayawardene	National Stadium, Karachi	Pakistan by 8 wickets
ODI 2800	21 January	Shoaib Malik	Mahela Jayawardene	National Stadium, Karachi	Sri Lanka by 129 runs
ODI 2803	24 January	Shoaib Malik	Mahela Jayawardene	Gaddafi Stadium, Lahore	Sri Lanka by 234 runs
Test series
Test 1909	21–25 February	Younis Khan	Mahela Jayawardene	National Stadium, Karachi	Match drawn
Test 1912	1–5 March	Younis Khan	Mahela Jayawardene	Gaddafi Stadium, Lahore	Match abandoned

- As a result of the firing in Lahore where several Sri Lankan players were injured, the 2nd Test was abandoned and Sri Lanka immediately returned home.

=== ICC World Cricket League Division Three ===
Pos	Team	Pld	W	L	T	NR	Pts	NRR	Qualification or relegation
1	Afghanistan	5	4	1	0	0	8	0.971	Team qualifies for 2009 World Cup Qualifier
2	Uganda	5	4	1	0	0	8	0.772	Team qualifies for 2009 World Cup Qualifier
3	Papua New Guinea	5	4	1	0	0	8	0.665	Team remains in 2011 Division Three
4	Hong Kong	5	2	3	0	0	4	−0.005	Team remains in 2011 Division Three
5	Cayman Islands	5	1	4	0	0	2	−1.384	Team is relegated to 2010 Division Four
6	Argentina	5	0	5	0	0	0	−1.036	Team is relegated to 2010 Division Four

Group Stage
No.	Date	Team 1	Captain 1	Team 2	Captain 2	Venue	Result
1st Match	24 January	Afghanistan	Nowroz Mangal	Uganda	JZ Kwebiha	St Albans Club, Buenos Aires	Uganda by 14 runs
2nd Match	24 January	Cayman Islands	PI Best	Papua New Guinea	R Dikana	Belgrano Athletic Club Ground, Buenos Aires	Papua New Guinea by 6 wickets
3rd Match	24 January	Argentina	E MacDermott	Hong Kong	Tabarak Dar	Hurlingham Club Ground, Buenos Aires	Hong Kong by 7 wickets
4th Match	25 January	Afghanistan	Nowroz Mangal	Hong Kong	Tabarak Dar	Belgrano Athletic Club Ground, Buenos Aires	Afghanistan by 13 runs
5th Match	25 January	Papua New Guinea	R Dikana	Argentina	E MacDermott	St Albans Club, Buenos Aires	Papua New Guinea by 21 runs
6th Match	25 January	Cayman Islands	PI Best	Uganda	JZ Kwebiha	Hurlingham Club Ground, Buenos Aires	Uganda by 9 wickets
7th Match	27 January	Afghanistan	Karim Khan	Argentina	E MacDermott	Hurlingham Club Ground, Buenos Aires	Afghanistan by 19 runs
8th Match	27 January	Hong Kong	Tabarak Dar	Cayman Islands	PI Best	St Albans Club, Buenos Aires	Hong Kong by 49 runs
9th Match	27 January	Papua New Guinea	R Dikana	Uganda	JZ Kwebiha	Belgrano Athletic Club Ground, Buenos Aires	Papua New Guinea by 26 runs
10th Match	28 January	Afghanistan	Karim Khan	Papua New Guinea	R Dikana	Hurlingham Club Ground, Buenos Aires	Afghanistan by 8 wickets
11th Match	28 January	Argentina	E MacDermott	Cayman Islands	SC Gordon	Belgrano Athletic Club Ground, Buenos Aires	Cayman Islands by 6 wickets
12th Match	28 January	Uganda	JZ Kwebiha	Hong Kong	Tabarak Dar	St Albans Club, Buenos Aires	Uganda by 1 run
13th Match	30 January	Afghanistan	Nowroz Mangal	Cayman Islands	SC Gordon	St Albans Club, Buenos Aires	No result
14th Match	30 January	Uganda	JZ Kwebiha	Argentina	E MacDermott	Belgrano Athletic Club Ground, Buenos Aires	No result
15th Match	30 January	Hong Kong	Tabarak Dar	Papua New Guinea	R Dikana	Hurlingham Club Ground, Buenos Aires	Papua New Guinea by 9 wickets (D/L)
Replay of 13th Match	31 January	Afghanistan	Nowroz Mangal	Cayman Islands	PI Best	St Albans Club, Buenos Aires	Afghanistan 82 runs
Replay of 14th Match	31 January	Uganda	JZ Kwebiha	Argentina	E MacDermott	Belgrano Athletic Club Ground, Buenos Aires	Uganda by 100 runs

=== Zimbabwe in Kenya ===
No.	Date	Home captain	Away captain	Venue	Result
ODI 2805	27 January	Steve Tikolo	Prosper Utseya	Mombasa Sports Club, Mombasa	Zimbabwe by 109 runs
ODI 2807	29 January	Steve Tikolo	Prosper Utseya	Mombasa Sports Club, Mombasa	Zimbabwe by 151 runs
ODI 2809	31 January	Steve Tikolo	Prosper Utseya	Nairobi Gymkhana Club, Nairobi	Zimbabwe by 4 wickets
ODI 2812	1 February	Steve Tikolo	Prosper Utseya	Nairobi Gymkhana Club, Nairobi	Zimbabwe by 66 runs
ODI 2814	4 February	Steve Tikolo	Prosper Utseya	Nairobi Gymkhana Club, Nairobi	Zimbabwe by 7 wickets

=== India in Sri Lanka ===
No.	Date	Home Captain	Away Captain	Venue	Result
ODI series
ODI 2806	28 January	Mahela Jayawardene	Mahendra Singh Dhoni	Rangiri Dambulla International Stadium, Dambulla	India by 6 wickets
ODI 2810	31 January	Mahela Jayawardene	Mahendra Singh Dhoni	R. Premadasa Stadium, Colombo	India by 15 runs
ODI 2813	3 February	Mahela Jayawardene	Mahendra Singh Dhoni	R. Premadasa Stadium, Colombo	India by 147 runs
ODI 2815	5 February	Mahela Jayawardene	Mahendra Singh Dhoni	R. Premadasa Stadium, Colombo	India by 67 runs
ODI 2818	8 February	Mahela Jayawardene	Mahendra Singh Dhoni	Sinhalese Sports Club Ground, Colombo	Sri Lanka by 68 runs
Only T20I
T20I 82	10 February	Tillakaratne Dilshan	Mahendra Singh Dhoni	R. Premadasa Stadium, Colombo	India by 3 wickets

== February ==
=== England in West Indies ===
No.	Date	Home Captain	Away Captain	Venue	Result
Test series
Test 1906	4–8 February	Chris Gayle	Andrew Strauss	Sabina Park, Kingston, Jamaica	West Indies by an innings and 23 runs
Test 1907	13–17 February	Chris Gayle	Andrew Strauss	Sir Vivian Richards Stadium, North Sound, Antigua	Match drawn
Test 1908	15–19 February	Chris Gayle	Andrew Strauss	Antigua Recreation Ground, St. John's, Antigua	Match drawn
Test 1911	26 February–2 March	Chris Gayle	Andrew Strauss	Kensington Oval, Bridgetown, Barbados	Match drawn
Test 1914	6–10 March	Chris Gayle	Andrew Strauss	Queen's Park Oval, Port of Spain, Trinidad	Match drawn
Only T20I
T20I 86	15 March	Denesh Ramdin	Andrew Strauss	Queen's Park Oval, Port of Spain, Trinidad	West Indies by 6 wickets
ODI series
ODI 2826	20 March	Chris Gayle	Andrew Strauss	Providence Stadium, Georgetown, Guyana	England by 1 run (D/L)
ODI 2827	22 March	Chris Gayle	Andrew Strauss	Providence Stadium, Georgetown, Guyana	West Indies by 21 runs
ODI 2828	27 March	Chris Gayle	Andrew Strauss	Kensington Oval, Bridgetown, Barbados	West Indies by 8 wickets (D/L)
ODI 2829	29 March	Chris Gayle	Andrew Strauss	Kensington Oval, Bridgetown, Barbados	England by 9 wickets (D/L)
ODI 2833	3 April	Chris Gayle	Andrew Strauss	Beausejour Stadium, Gros Islet, St Lucia	England by 26 runs

- The 2nd Test was abandoned due to an unfit outfield. Therefore, an extra test was arranged to be played at the Antigua Recreation Ground, starting 2 days after the abandonment.

=== Women's Tri-Series in Bangladesh ===
Team	P	W	L	T	NR	Pts	NRR
Sri Lanka	4	3	1	0	0	15	+1.160
Pakistan	4	2	1	1	0	10	–0.218
Bangladesh	4	1	3	0	0	5	–0.893

advanced to the Final

=== India in New Zealand ===
No.	Date	Home Captain	Away Captain	Venue	Result
T20I series
T20I 84	25 February	Daniel Vettori	Mahendra Singh Dhoni	AMI Stadium, Christchurch	New Zealand by 7 wickets
T20I 85	27 February	Daniel Vettori	Mahendra Singh Dhoni	Westpac Stadium, Wellington	New Zealand by 5 wickets
ODI series
ODI 2821	3 March	Daniel Vettori	Mahendra Singh Dhoni	McLean Park, Napier	India by 53 runs
ODI 2822	6 March	Daniel Vettori	Mahendra Singh Dhoni	Seddon Park, Hamilton	No result
ODI 2823	8 March	Brendon McCullum	Mahendra Singh Dhoni	AMI Stadium, Christchurch	India by 58 runs
ODI 2824	11 March	Daniel Vettori	Mahendra Singh Dhoni	Westpac Stadium, Wellington	India by 84 runs (D/L)
ODI 2825	14 March	Daniel Vettori	Mahendra Singh Dhoni	Eden Park, Auckland	New Zealand by 8 wickets
Test series
Test 1915	18–22 March	Daniel Vettori	Mahendra Singh Dhoni	Seddon Park, Hamilton	India by 10 wickets
Test 1917	26–30 March	Daniel Vettori	Virender Sehwag	McLean Park, Napier	Match drawn
Test 1918	3–7 April	Daniel Vettori	Mahendra Singh Dhoni	Basin Reserve, Wellington	Match drawn

=== Australia in South Africa ===
No.	Date	Home Captain	Away Captain	Venue	Result
Test series
Test 1910	26 February–2 March	Graeme Smith	Ricky Ponting	New Wanderers Stadium, Johannesburg	Australia by 162 runs
Test 1913	6–10 March	Graeme Smith	Ricky Ponting	Kingsmead, Durban	Australia by 175 runs
Test 1916	19–23 March	Jacques Kallis	Ricky Ponting	Newlands, Cape Town	South Africa by an innings and 20 runs
T20I series
T20I 87	27 March	Johan Botha	Ricky Ponting	New Wanderers Stadium, Johannesburg	South Africa by 4 wickets
T20I 88	29 March	Johan Botha	Ricky Ponting	SuperSport Park, Centurion	South Africa by 17 runs
ODI series
ODI 2832	3 April	Graeme Smith	Ricky Ponting	Kingsmead, Durban	Australia by 141 runs
ODI 2834	5 April	Graeme Smith	Ricky Ponting	SuperSport Park, Centurion	South Africa by 7 wickets
ODI 2839	9 April	Graeme Smith	Ricky Ponting	Newlands, Cape Town	South Africa by 25 runs
ODI 2840	13 April	Graeme Smith	Ricky Ponting	St George's Park, Port Elizabeth	South Africa by 61 runs
ODI 2841	17 April	Graeme Smith	Ricky Ponting	New Wanderers Stadium, Johannesburg	Australia by 47 runs

== Season summary ==
=== Result Summary ===
	Test					ODI					T20I				
	Matches	Wins	Loss	Draw	Tied	Matches	Wins	Loss	Tied	No result	Matches	Wins	Loss	Tied	No result
Australia	12	5	5	2	0	15	5	9	0	1	5	3	2	0	0
Bangladesh	6	0	5	1	0	11	4	7	0	0	1	0	1	0	0
Canada	No Test Status					No Matches					4	0	3	1	0
England	7	0	2	5	0	10	3	7	0	0	1	0	1	0	0
India	9	4	0	5	0	15	12	2	0	1	3	1	2	0	0
Ireland	No Test Status					2	1	1	0	0	No Matches				
Kenya	No Test Status					9	1	8	0	0	No Matches				
New Zealand	9	1	3	5	0	18	7	7	0	4	5	3	1	1	0
Pakistan	2	0	0	2	0	6	4	2	0	0	4	3	1	0	0
South Africa	8	5	3	0	0	14	11	3	0	0	5	3	2	0	0
Sri Lanka	4	2	0	2	0	16	10	6	0	0	5	3	2	0	0
West Indies	7	1	0	6	0	13	3	8	0	2	3	1	1	1	0
Zimbabwe	No Test Status					17	8	9	0	0	4	1	2	1	0
Source:	Cricinfo					Cricinfo					Cricinfo				

=== Stats Leaders ===
==== Test ====
Most Runs
	Matches	Runs	Avg	HS
(India) Gautam Gambhir	8	1269	84.60	206
(Australia) Simon Katich	12	1070	50.95	131*
(Australia) Michael Clarke	12	992	49.60	138
(India) Sachin Tendulkar	9	896	59.73	160
(Australia) Ricky Ponting	12	861	39.13	123
source: cricinfo.com

Most Wickets
	Matches	Wickets	Avg	BBI
(Australia) Mitchell Johnson	12	60	25.25	8/61
(South Africa) Dale Steyn	8	42	27.30	5/63
(India) Harbhajan Singh	8	39	27.05	6/63
(New Zealand) Daniel Vettori	9	36	27.22	6/56
(India) Zaheer Khan	9	32	32.59	5/65
source: cricinfo.com

==== ODI ====
Most Runs
	Matches	Runs	Avg	HS
(India) Virender Sehwag	14	782	60.15	125*
(India) Yuvraj Singh	14	709	59.08	138*
(Cricket West Indies) Chris Gayle	13	643	53.58	135
(Sri Lanka) Kumar Sangakkara	16	631	45.07	84
(South Africa) Jacques Kallis	12	630	57.27	92*
source: cricinfo.com

Most Wickets
	Matches	Wickets	Avg	BBI
(Sri Lanka) Ajantha Mendis	15	31	15.61	6/29
(New Zealand) Kyle Mills	18	26	24.80	4/35
(Sri Lanka) Muttiah Muralitharan	15	26	17.50	5/29
(Sri Lanka) Nuwan Kulasekara	15	25	20.28	3/13
(South Africa) Dale Steyn	11	25	19.12	4/16
source: cricinfo.com

==== T20I ====
Most Runs
	Matches	Runs	Avg	HS
(New Zealand) Brendon McCullum	5	259	88.33	69*
(South Africa) Jean-Paul Duminy	5	197	49.25	78
(Australia) David Hussey	5	177	44.25	88*
(Australia) David Warner	5	177	35.40	89
(Zimbabwe) Hamilton Masakadza	4	169	42.25	79
source: cricinfo.com

Most Wickets
	Matches	Wickets	Avg	BBI
(Sri Lanka) Ajantha Mendis	3	11	5.00	4/15
(New Zealand) Daniel Vettori	5	8	12.12	3/16
(Pakistan) Umar Gul	4	7	9.00	4/13
(Canada) Harvir Baidwan	4	6	17.00	3/15
(Canada) Balaji Rao	4	6	17.83	3/21
source: cricinfo.com

=== Milestones ===
==== Test ====
- (India) Sachin Tendulkar reached 12,000 runs in Test on 17 October (vs Australia) 1st All Time
- (India) Sourav Ganguly reached 7,000 runs in Test on 18 October (vs Australia) 33rd All Time
- (India) V. V. S. Laxman played his 100th Test match on 6 November (vs Australia) 46th All Time
- (India) Harbhajan Singh reached 300 wickets in Test on 7 November (vs Australia) 22nd All Time
- (India) Sachin Tendulkar reached 100 catches in Test on 10 November (vs Australia) 27th All Time
- (Australia) Brett Lee reached 300 wickets in Test on 22 November (vs New Zealand) 23rd All Time
- (Australia) Matthew Hayden played his 100th Test match on 28 November (vs New Zealand) 47th All Time
- (Australia) Ricky Ponting captained his 50th Test match on 28 November (vs New Zealand) 12th All Time
- (New Zealand) Billy Bowden umpired his 50th Test match (India vs Australia) on 11 December 10th All time
- (South Africa) Graeme Smith reached 6,000 runs in Test on 20 December (vs Australia) 49th All time
- (Cricket West Indies) Chris Gayle reached 5,000 runs in Test on 20 December (vs New Zealand) 72nd All time
- (South Africa) Jacques Kallis took his 250th wicket in Test on 26 December (vs Australia) 31st All time
- (Sri Lanka) Chaminda Vaas took his 350th wicket in Test on 26 December (Bangladesh) 19th All time
- (Sri Lanka) Mahela Jayawardene played his 100th Test match on 3 January (vs Bangladesh) 48th All time
- (Cricket West Indies) Ramnaresh Sarwan reached 5,000 runs in Test on 6 January (vs England) 73rd All time
- (Sri Lanka) Mahela Jayawardene reached 8,000 runs in Test on 21 February (vs Pakistan) 20th All time
- (Pakistan) Younis Khan reached 5,000 runs in Test on 24 February (vs Sri Lanka) 74th All time
- (Pakistan) Younis Khan scored triple century in Test on 24 February (vs Sri Lanka) 23rd All time
- (South Africa) Jacques Kallis reached 10,000 runs in Test on 27 February (vs Australia) 8th All time

==== ODI ====
- (Bangladesh) Mashrafe Mortaza scored 1,000 runs on 14 October (vs New Zealand), becoming in the 43rd All time cricketer with 1,000 runs and 100 wickets
- (Cricket West Indies) Chris Gayle took 150 wickets on 16 November (vs Pakistan) 46th All time
- (India) Harbhajan Singh took 200 wickets on 20 November (vs England) 30th All time
- (India) Virender Sehwag reached 6,000 runs on 23 November (vs England) 39th All time
- (Zimbabwe) Tatenda Taibu reached 100 dismissals on 30 November (vs Sri Lanka) 21st All time
- (Cricket West Indies) Chris Gayle scored his 7,000th run on 13 January (vs New Zealand) 26th All time
- (Sri Lanka) Kumar Sangakkara scored his 7,000th run on 16 January (vs Bangladesh) 27th All time
- (South Africa) Jacques Kallis scored his 10,000th run on 23 January (vs Australia) 8th All time
- (Australia) Nathan Bracken took 150 wickets on 23 January (vs South Africa) 47th All time
- (Sri Lanka) Muttiah Muralitharan got his 500th wicket on 24 January (vs Pakistan) 2nd All Time
- (Sri Lanka) Sanath Jayasuriya scored his 13,000th run on 28 January (vs India) 2nd All Time
- (Sri Lanka) Mahela Jayawardene scored his 8,000th run on 3 February (vs India) 18th All Time
- (India) Irfan Pathan took 150 wickets on 5 February (vs Sri Lanka) 48th All time

=== Records ===
==== Test ====
- (India) Sachin Tendulkar broke the record of runs on 17 October (vs Australia) with runs scored off Peter Siddle.
- (Sri Lanka) Mahela Jayawardene and Thilan Samaraweera broke the record for the 4th wicket with 437 runs vs Pakistan on 22 February. Shoaib Malik ended the partnership by dismissing Jayawardene. The partnership faced 651 balls and Jayawardene contributed 199 runs, Samaraweera 231 runs.
- (India) Rahul Dravid broke the record of most catches on 6 April (vs New Zealand) upon helping dismiss Tim McIntosh.

==== ODI ====
- (Sri Lanka) Ajantha Mendis was fastest to reach 50 wickets on 12 January in his 19th match when he dismissed Ray Price (Zimbabwe).
- (Sri Lanka) Mahela Jayawardene broke the record of catches by non-wicket keeper vs. Pakistan with 157, when he caught Salman Butt on 21 January.
- Zimbabwe achieved their highest score in an ODI with 351 for 7 in the victory over Kenya (29 January)
- (Sri Lanka) Muttiah Muralitharan broke the record of wickets taken with 503, when he dismissed Gautam Gambhir on 5 February.
