= Bibi Khatun =

Bibi Khatun (Persian: بي بي خاتون) may refer to:

- Bibi Khatun, Bushehr, Iran
- Bibi Khatun, Kohgiluyeh and Boyer-Ahmad, Iran
- Bibi Jamal Khatun (died 1647), a Sindhi Sufi saint
