= Safia Khatun (language activist) =

Bangladeshi language movement activist

- Born: January 15, 1931; Rangpur District, Bengal Presidency, British India
- Died: 11 February 1993
- Education: Lady Brabourne College; University of Dhaka; University of Northern Colorado, United States
- Occupations: Academic, organizer
- Known for: Activist of the Bengali language movement
- Father: Asgar Ali

Safia Khatun (15 January 1931 – 11 February 1993) was a Bangladeshi language movement activist, academic, and organizer. She played a pioneering role in mobilizing women during the 1952 Bengali language movement. As a student at the University of Dhaka, she served as vice-president of the Women Students’ Union and vice-president of the Chameli House Student Union, where she worked to organize female students in support of the movement. She pursued higher education in Bangladesh and abroad, later joining the Institute of Education and Research at the University of Dhaka as a professor. She was a member of the Bangladesh Public Service Commission and served as an adviser to the Ministry of Social Welfare and Women's Affairs with the rank of minister under the government of President H. M. Ershad. Educational institutions and roads in Bangladesh have been named in her honor.

== Early life and education ==
Safia was born on 15 January 1931 in Binnagari village of Rangpur District, Bengal Presidency, British India (present-day Dakshin Battish Hazari village, Aditmari Upazila, Lalmonirhat District, Bangladesh). Her father, Mir Asgar Ali, was a prominent lawyer who practiced law in Kolkata.

Safia Khatun passed matriculation in 1946 and completed her IA in 1948 and BA from Lady Brabourne College. In 1950, she enrolled in the MA preliminary program at the University of Dhaka. She obtained an MA in economics from the University of Dhaka, an M.Ed. from the Institute of Education and Research in 1961, and a PhD in psychology from the University of Northern Colorado in 1965.

== Career ==
In 1966, Safia Khatun joined the Institute of Education and Research at the University of Dhaka as a professor. In 1977, she was appointed a member of the Bangladesh Public Service Commission. In 1983, President Hussain Muhammad Ershad appointed her as adviser to the Ministry of Social Welfare and Women's Affairs. On 1 February 1984, Lalmonirhat was declared a separate district under her supervision.

== Language movement ==
When the government of Pakistan declared Urdu as the only state language in 1952, Safia Khatun became deeply involved in the protests. As vice-president of the Women Students’ Union, she played a leading role in mobilizing female students. At Chameli House, the women's hostel of Dhaka University, she held meetings urging students to join the movement for Bangla as a state language.

Language activist Rawshan Ara Bachchu recalled Safia Khatun's role on the night before 21 February, when students realized that Section 144 would not be withdrawn. Excitement spread among the female students, who divided into groups to bring other girls from schools and colleges to join the demonstrations. Safia Khatun was among the first group of women who broke Section 144 by climbing over a wall and joining the protest. Inspired by her, many other female students followed.

She adopted various strategies to mobilize female students in women's colleges and girls’ schools across Dhaka, assigning responsibilities to peers to build public support. At Chameli House, she organized meetings, rallies, and processions in support of Bangla.

On 4 February 1952, during a student strike called by the All-Party State Language Action Committee of Dhaka University, she led a procession of female students that later joined the larger rally marching towards the residence of the Chief Minister of East Pakistan. Throughout February, she was active in almost every meeting and rally of the movement. On 21 February, she led female students in organizing the mass rally at Amtala. She urged student leaders to mobilize girls from women's colleges and schools to join the procession. Because of her organizational foresight, a large number of female students gathered at the rally. When it was proposed that students break Section 144 in groups of four, she opposed the idea, insisting instead that all students should march together. She was one of the leaders who initiated the breaking of Section 144. Among those active with her were Sufia Ibrahim, Rawshan Ara Bachchu, Shamsunnahar, and Halima Khatun.

== Political activities ==
During her student years, Dr. Safia Khatun served as vice-president of the Dhaka University central Student's Union. She was general secretary of the Dhaka University Women's Hall Union (1950–51) and vice-president of the Chameli House Student Union (1951–52). In 1952, she played a leading role in breaking the police barricades and defying Section 144. That same year, she travelled to Turkey on a goodwill mission.

== Recognition and honours ==
In 2017, on the occasion of International Mother Language Day, the Aditmari Upazila administration posthumously honoured her. A high school in Aditmari, Lalmonirhat, was named Dr. Safia Khatun High School in her memory. Dhaka South City Corporation named a road in Dhanmondi “Bhasha Sainik Safia Khatun Road” in recognition of her contributions.

== Death ==
Safia Khatun died on 11 February 1993.
