= Tourism in Nakhchivan Autonomous Republic =

Map of Nakhchivan Autonomous Republic within Azerbaijan

The Nakhchivan Autonomous Republic is one of the touristic regions of Azerbaijan with its flora and fauna, climate, and ancient cultural monuments. Nakhchivan is known for its historical monuments such as Momuna Khatun, Yusif ibn Kuseyir, Gulustan tombs, and Garabaghlar. There are other touristic places like Babek castle, Kilit cave, Alinja castle, and Gamigaya in Nakhchivan.

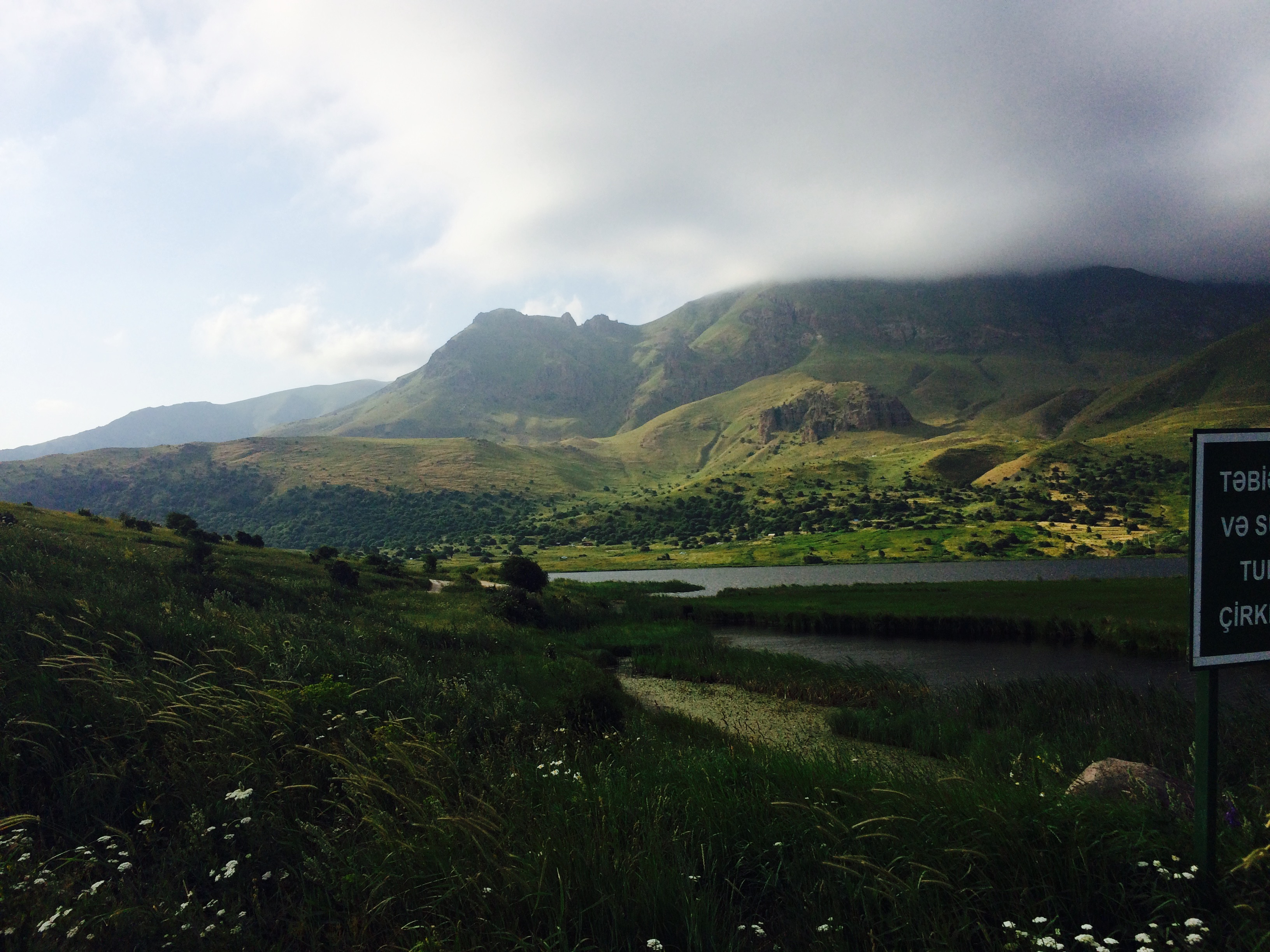
General view of Nakhchivan nature. The Batabat lake located in Shabuz district of Nakhchivan

Nakhchivan is also famous for religious holy places and sanctuaries such as Ashabi-Kahf and Prophet Noah's grave tomb.

There have been improvements in the infrastructure facilities in the recent years. Newly established resort parks, restoration of ancient monuments, reestablishment of Daridagh arsenic water dispensary and Duzdagh and Badamli physiotherapy hospitals have been parts of these improvements.

In addition, Nakhchivan hosted conferences, which helped to develop its tourism. In 2006, “Tourism, Development and Perspectives” conference was held in Nakhchivan. “Religious and Health Tourism: Organization of Spiritual and Physical Rest” conference was held in 2008, which was attended by the representatives from member countries of the Organization of Islamic Conference.

Nakhchivan is also homeland of many ancient and medieval Turkish – Islamic cultural and historical monuments. In 2009, The Nakhchivan Autonomous Republic was announced as “the Asian region's Capital of Islamic Culture for 2018” at the 6th Conference of Culture Ministers of OIC Member States, held in Baku.

== Statistics ==
The number of tourists visited Nakhchivan during 2006 - 2017 is listed below.

Years	2006	2007	2008	2009	2010	2011	2012	2013	2014	2015	2016	2017
Number	93930	140895	219118	225914	287634	343139	358963	370638	378102	389823	403275	413357

== Historical monuments ==
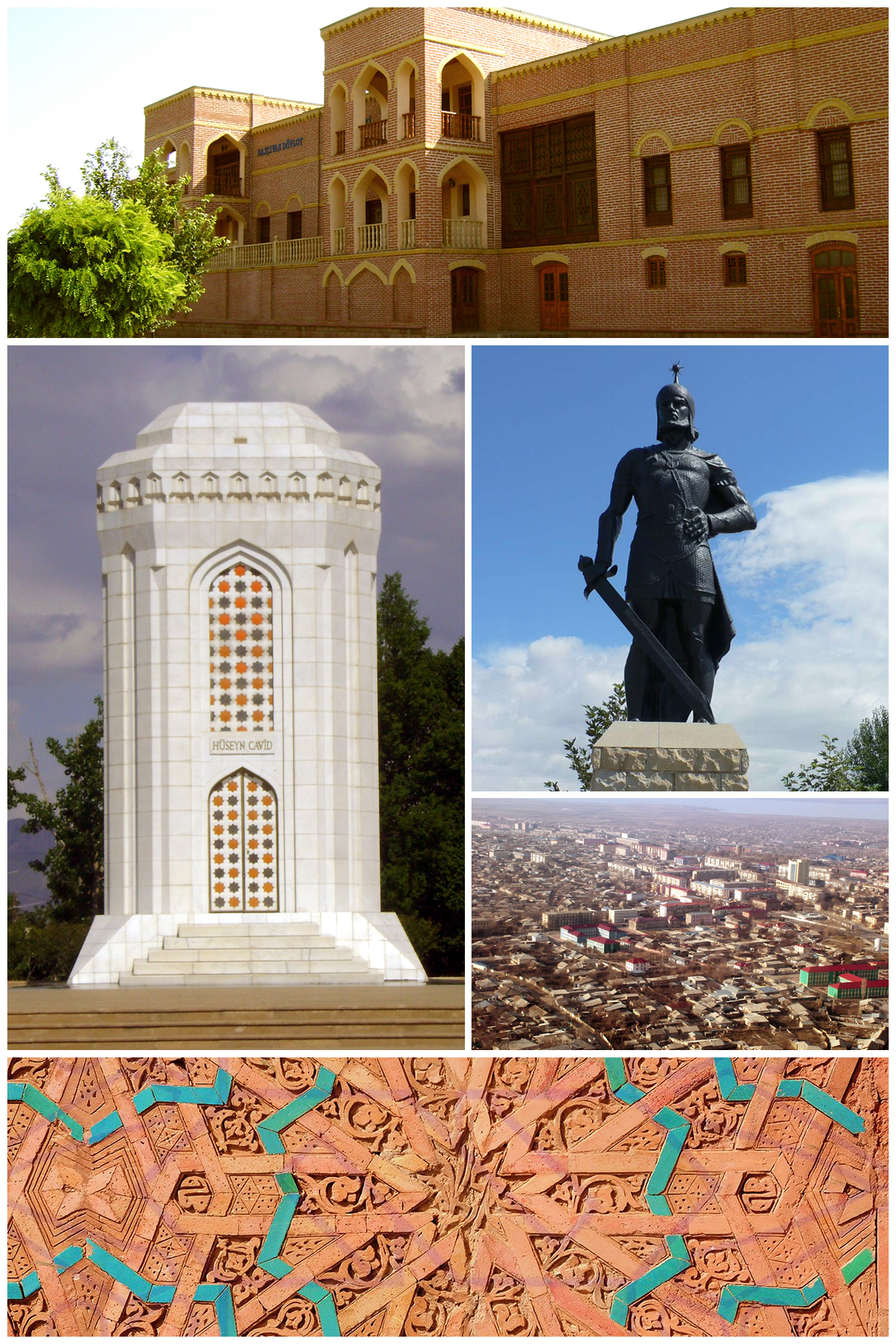
Montage of historical monuments in Nakhchivan

There are 1162 historical monuments in Nakhchivan. The famous examples for the historical monuments in Nakhchivan are Aghoghlan tomb, Alinjachay Khanagah, Ashabi-Kahf, Aza Bridge, Darkand Dome, Dirnis mosque, Farhad house, Gamigaya, Garabaghlar tomb, Gazanchi Bridge, Geysariyya, Gilan tomb, Gulustan tomb, Haji Huseynoglu mosque, Khan palace, Momuna Khatun tomb, and Noah tomb.

Amiraddin Masud Nakhchivani who lived in the 12th century in the palace of the Eldanizlar, contributed to the development of cultural, memorial, and religious architecture of Nakhchivan.

The table below summaries the cultural monuments in the Nakhchivan Autonomous Republic.

Types of monuments	Numbers
The nature monuments	7
The historical monuments	36
The architectural monuments	285
The archeological monuments	663
The places for pilgrimage	140
The monumental art monuments	31

=== Alinja castle ===
Alinja castle is a historical monument that was built at the top of a rock in the 6th century. It is located near from Nakhchivan and is one of the tourist destinations. The castle is situated at an altitude of 1800 meters. Since it was one of the safest castles at that time, many leaders of the Ildenizids, the Khulaguids, the Atabeys of Azerbaijan, and the Jelairids saved their treasures in Alinja.

=== Aghbujag ===
Aghbujag archeological site is located in Sharur region, which has become one of the top touristic places in the Caucasus. Based on the archeological items that were found, the Aghbujag is one of ancient settlements established in the 5th – 4th centuries B.C. The items found here including ancient graves and cone shaped monuments, belong to the late period of antiquity.

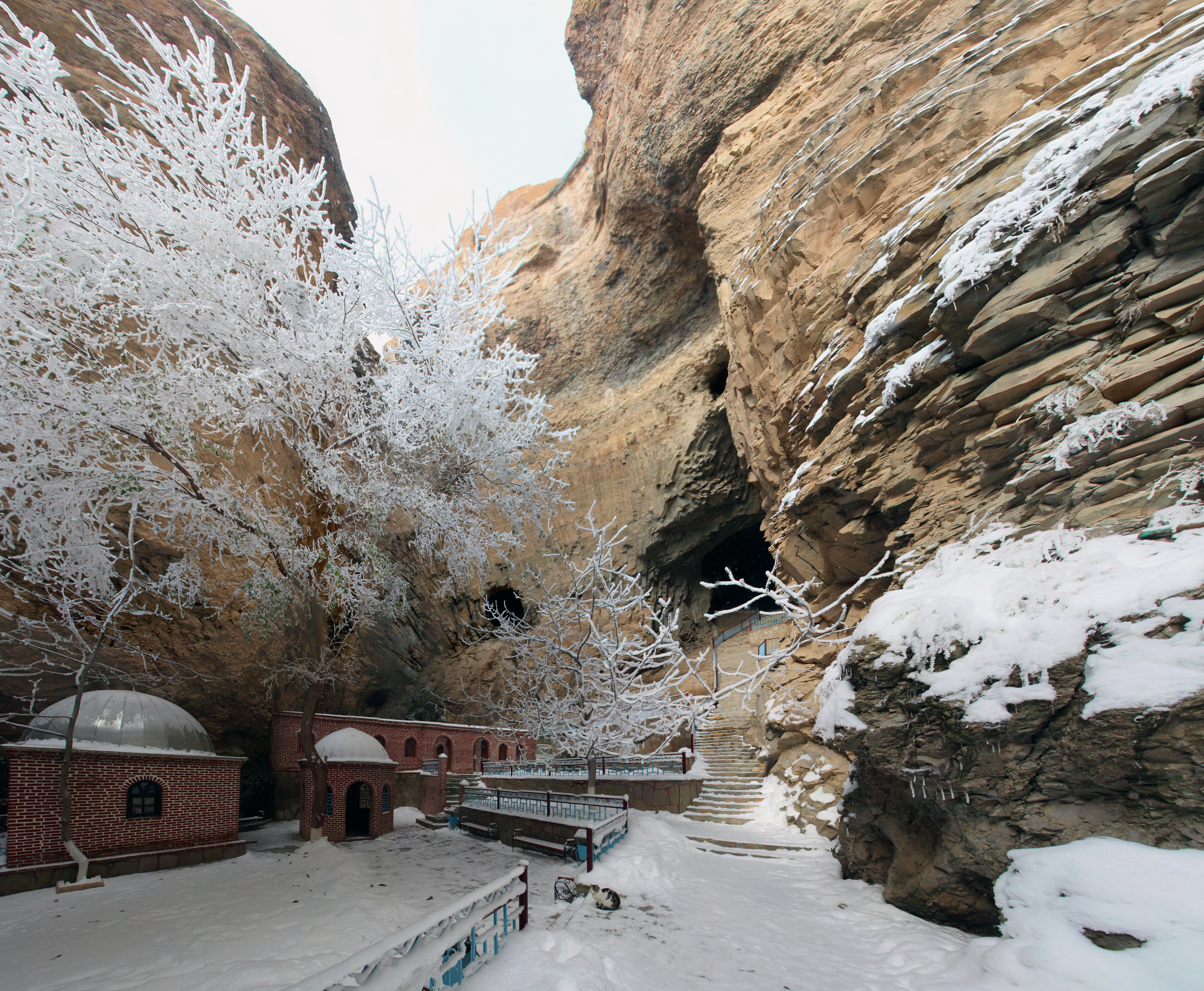
Ashabi-Kahf in winter

=== Ashabi-Kahf ===
The name Ashabi-Kahf means “Cave masters” in Arabic. It is located in the natural cave between Ilandagh and Nahajir mountains. The history of this place has been related with the event in Korani-Kerim, which is about seven young people who stood against those who did not believe in God, and the story of their hide in the cave and sleep of 300 years in Ashabi-Kahf. Because of the connection of this place to Korani-Kerim, people viewed Ashabi-Kahf as a sacred place.

In 1998, there was restoration and construction works in Ashabi-Kahf on the basis of the order of the former president of the Azerbaijan Republic, Heydar Aliyev.

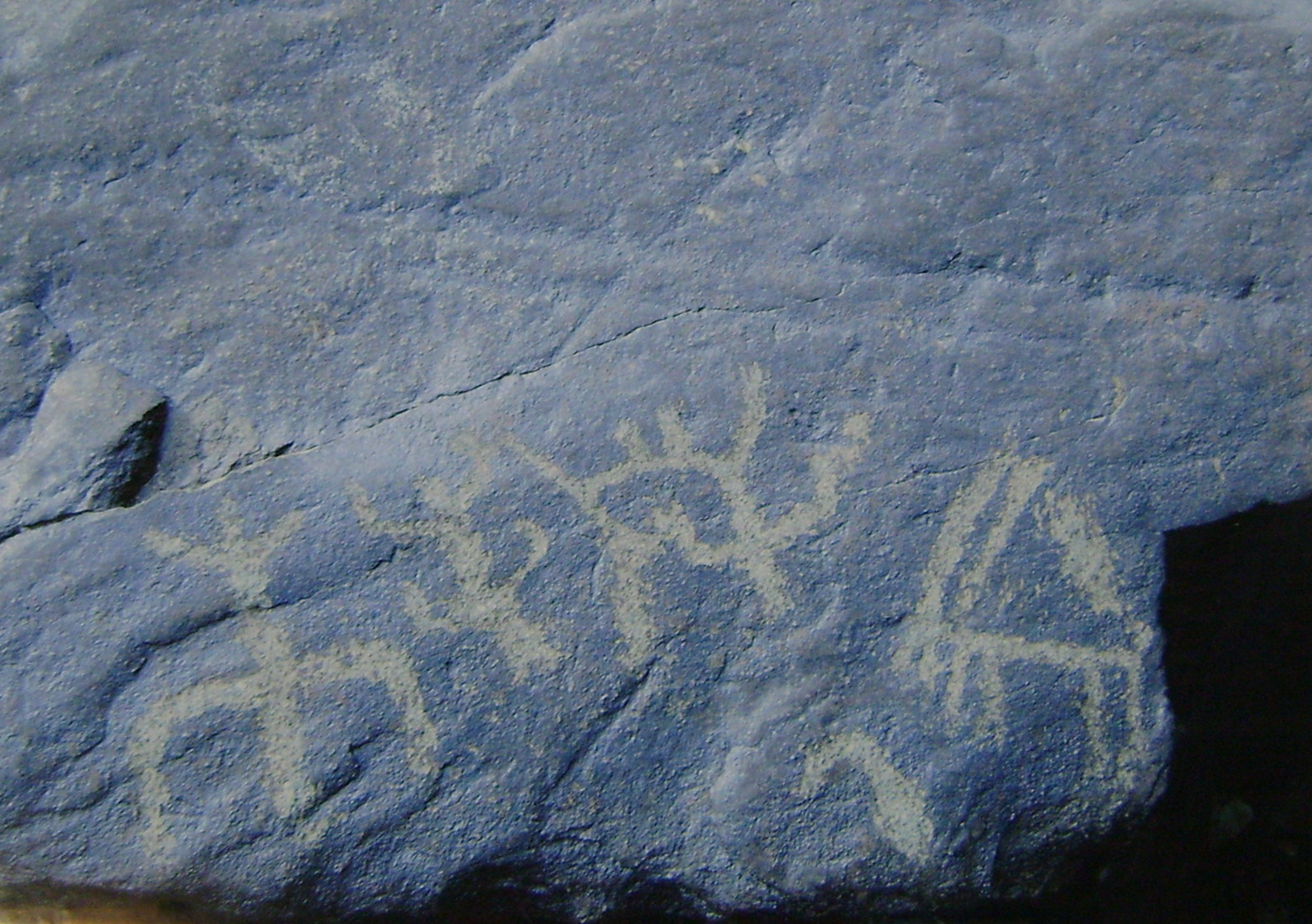
Inscriptions on the Gamigaya mountain

=== Gamigaya ===
Gamigaya is the mountain in Ordubad regions of Nakhchivan, in southwest of Camisholan, Garangush flats of Gapijg peak. The height of this mountain is 3725 meters. There are inscriptions on the mountain dated back to 4-1 millennium B.C.

=== Momuna Khatun Tomb ===
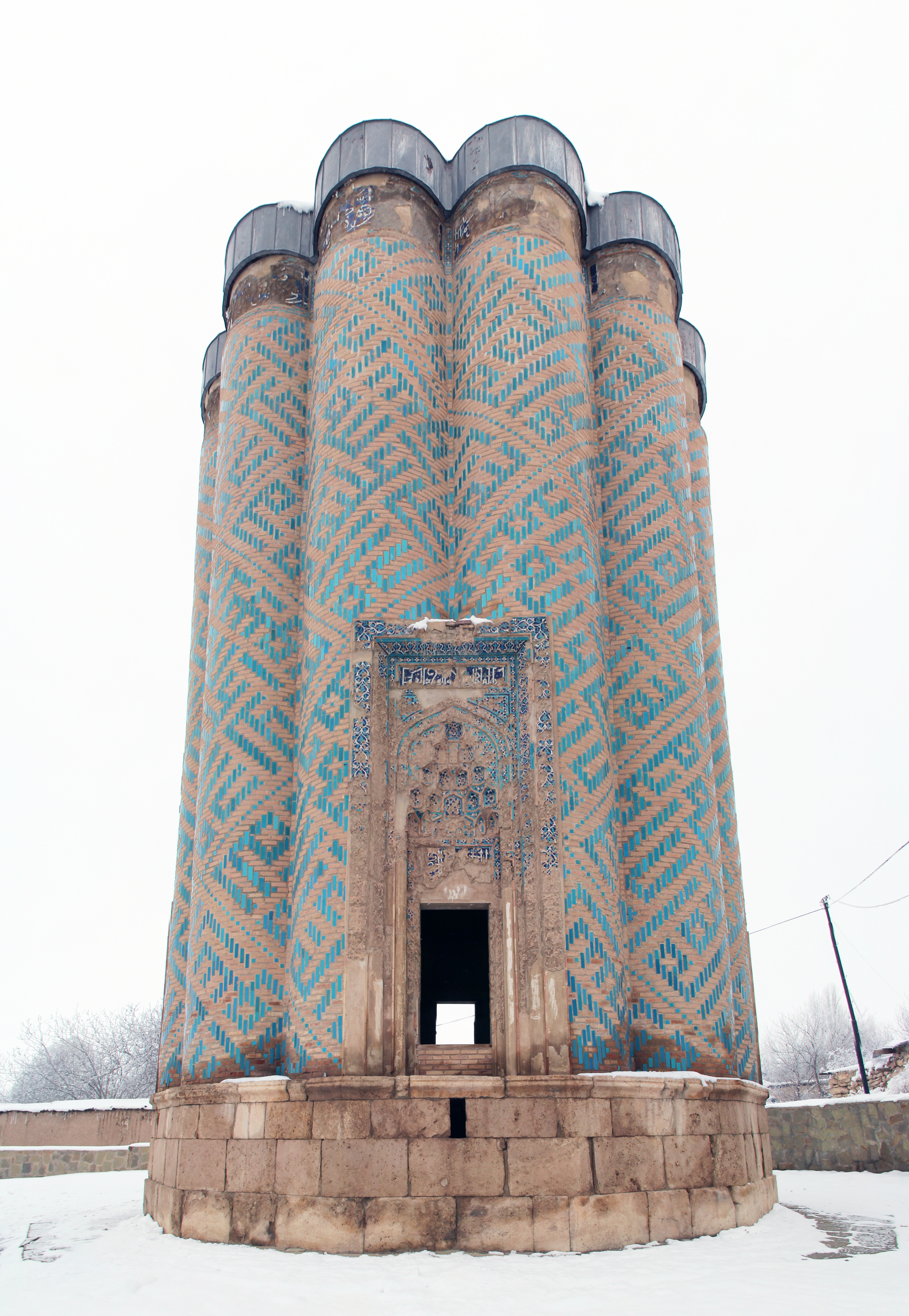
Garabaghlar Mausoleum

Momuna Khatun Tomb is “one of the pearls of the Eastern architecture”. This historical monument was built in 1186 in the west part of Nakhchivan city by the architect Ajami Abubakir Nakhchivani, the founder of school of architecture in Azerbaijan. Momuna Khatun was wife of the founder of Azerbaijan Atabay state, Shamsaddin Eldaniz, who ordered the establishment of this tomb after his wife. The tomb was built on the grave of Momuna Khatun. Some investigators indicated that Shamsaddin Eldaniz and his wife Momuna Khatun and their son Mahammad Jahan Pahlavan were buried in the tomb.

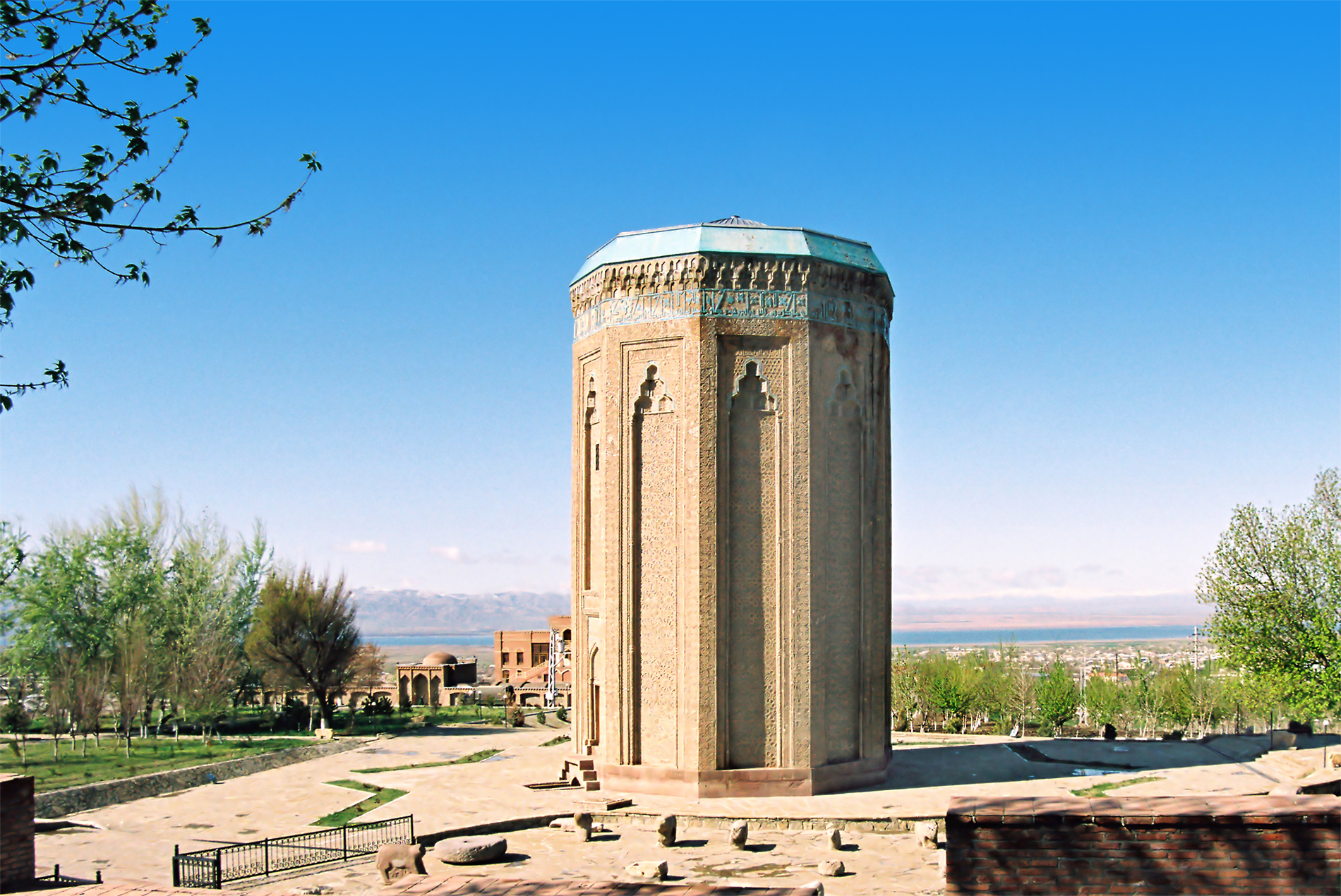
Momuna Khatun Tomb

Initially, the height of the tomb was 34 meters, however, later 8 meters from its cover were destroyed. Exterior view of the tomb is decagonal, while its interior view is round.

The art historian M.V. Alpatov stated about the Momuna Khatun monument: “The Momuna Khatun tomb in Nakhchivan is a monument of rare beauty”.

Since the historical monument reflects the ancient history of architectural schooling in Azerbaijan, on September 30, 1998, Momuna Khatun tomb was inscribed on the UNESCO World Heritage Tentative List in Need of Urgent Safeguarding.

=== Garabaghlar Mausoleum ===
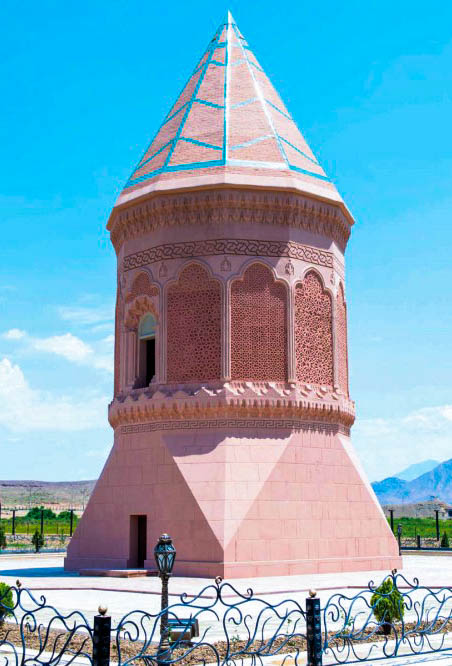
Gulustan tomb

This historical monument belongs to the Middle Ages. There is a double minaret which was built at the end of the 12th century and at the beginning of 13th, while the head arch that joins the minarets belong to the 14th century. “Architectural adornment of minarets is carried out from burned and gazed brick.” The Garabaghlar mausoleum consists of 4 main arches that were placed in the North, South, West and East directions.

On September 30, 1998, Garabaghlar mausoleum was inscribed on the UNESCO World Heritage Tentative List in Need of Urgent Safeguarding as a part of Nakhchivan Mausoleums.

=== Gulustan Tomb ===
The monument is located near the Gulustan village, Julfa region of Nakhchivan. It was built under the influence of Momuna Khatun tomb at the beginning of the 13th century. The 12 faced body of the monument was built of red sand stones. In medieval sources, Gulustan tomb is called as “Kesik Gunbez”. The monument has an important place among other medieval architectural landmarks of Azerbaijan because it varies from them in its architecture-constructive structure.

The tomb is connected to the other monument around Gulustan. While geometric ornaments of the monument look like the ones from Ajami period, architectural style of the Gulustan mausoleum reminds the monuments of Seljuk's times. The tomb embodies the cultural integration between the Seljuq Empire and the ancient tribes of Azerbaijan in the 11th – 13th centuries.

Because of its importance from historical and cultural aspects, “Gulustan” Historical-Cultural Reserve was created. On September 30, 1998, the monument was inscribed on the UNESCO World Heritage Tentative List in Need of Urgent Safeguarding.

== Museums ==
There are 28 museums in the Nakhchivan Autonomous Republic. There are 110000 exhibitions that are protected in the museums.

=== Heydar Aliyev Museum ===
Heydar Aliyev museum was established in 1999. The museum was founded after the memory of Heydar Aliyev, his family, childhood and youth, personal documents, decisions, signed letter, and order that belong to the period when he was the Chairman of the Supreme Assembly of Nakhchivan Autonomous Republic. Albums, books, newspapers, and magazines that reflect the life and activities of former leader Heydar Aliyev, and his personal belongings are saved in the museum.

Heydar Aliyev museum consists of five sections. The number of exhibitions is 4525 in the museum.

=== Nakhchivan State History Museum ===
The history-ethnography museum was founded in 1924, which got the state status later. 34494 exhibitions that belong to the ancient history of Nakhchivan are saved in the museum. Those exhibitions comprise four periods – ancient, medieval, present, and modern time. The Museum is composed of 10 departments.

Things that belong early ages, ancient copper and silver money, picture materials of architectural monuments are preserved and exhibited in the museum.

=== Nakhchivan State Carpet Museum ===
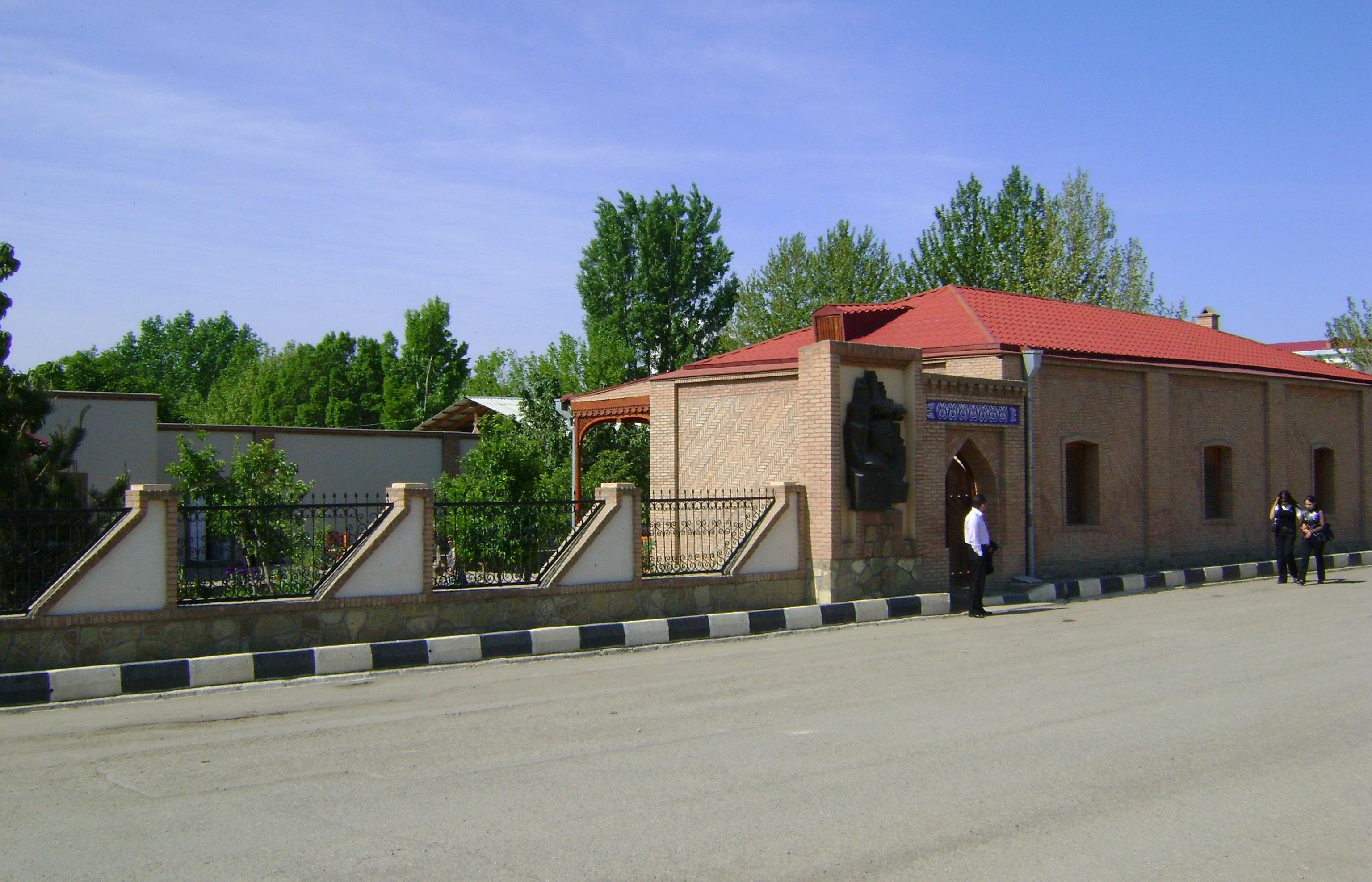
The House Museum of Huseyn Javid

This museum initially was established in 1998; however, it was moved to a new building on March 20, 2010. There are 3296 cultural materials, of which 331 are carpets in the museum. Carpets with ornaments related to the different period of times are exhibited in the museum. There are 124 Tabriz – Nakhchivan carpets in the museum as well. After the reconstruction work in 2013, the number of exhibitions in the Nakhchivan State Carpet Museum enriched.

=== The House Museum of Huseyn Javid ===
There are 9111 exhibits in this museum, which was established in 1981 in Huseyn Javid's house. Those exhibits consist of his works, photos of his life, household stuff and other things.

== Health Tourism ==
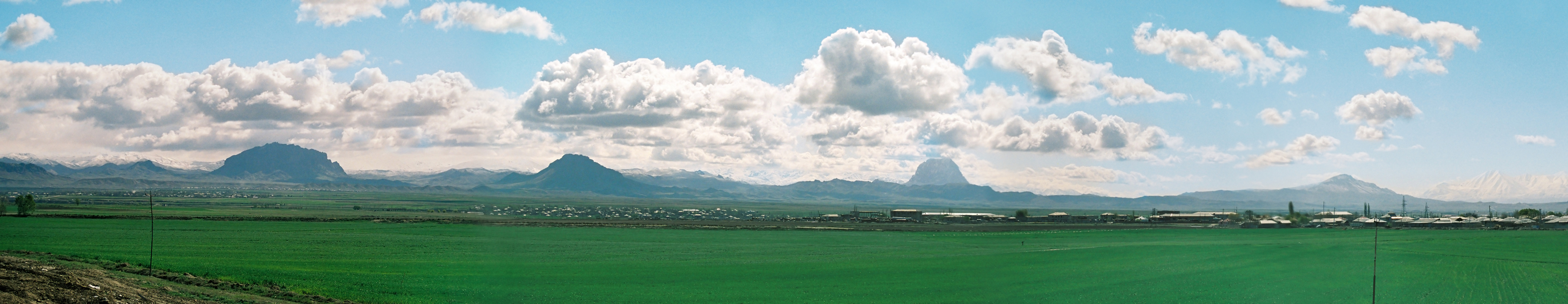
Nakchivan landscape

Nakhchivan is famous for its health tourism since it has rich natural resources. People visit Nakhchivan from different countries to get treatment. The famous treatment centers in Nakhchivan are the Daridagh Balneological Hospital, Duzdagh Physiotherapy Center, and Badamli Physiotherapy Hospital.

=== The Daridagh Balneological Hospital ===
Daridagh arsenic thermal water is located 15 kilometers far from in Julfa region. It has crucial healing benefits for skin diseases such as impetigo, pyoderma, itching, etc. The temperature of the thermal arsenic water comes from 520 C source.

Daridagh arsenic water sources existed since the 15th century, however, there were not health centers in the area until the middle of the 20th century. The first hospital was built in 1976, which had five bath capacity. In 2005, new medical centers that meet the requirements of international standards were built, and now those centers are equipped with advanced conditions to serve 25-30 patient per hour.

=== Duzdagh Physiotherapy Center ===
Duzdagh Physiotherapy Center was established on December 29, 1979, and started its functioning on March 7, 1980, within the Babek Central Hospital. The center consists of the ground and the underground department, and the area of the center is approximately 15.000 square meters. Inauguration of the Duzdagh Sanatorium Complex was in June 2008.

In the center, different types of diseases such as allergic rhino sinusoid pathologies, pre-asthma, bronchial asthmas, chronic bronchitis, chronic bronchitis allergic with asthmatic component are treated.

=== Badamli Physiotherapy Hospital ===
The hospital was founded in 1980, in Shahbuz region of Nakhchivan. Badamli water has a healing effect and can cure the digestive system diseases such as chronic gastritis, chronic pancreatitis diseases, chronic enterocolitis, gall-stone diseases, which are treated in the center.

== Archeological sites ==
The most of archeological monuments in Nakhchivan belong to the early Iron Age. They are Irinchoy Ancient site, Ilikligaya, Ishiglar settlement, and sanctuary of Iydali Piri.

=== Ilikligaya Necropolis ===
This archeological monument is located in Ordubad region, and based on the items found here, the settlement dates back to II – I millennium B.C. Pitcher, tea pots, cup, and dishes found in the settlement belong to the last Bronze and early Iron Ages.

=== Ishiglar settlement ===
The settlement is situated in Babek region and was built in the Middle Ages. The area covers 46 000 m2 of the land.

=== Iydali Piri ===
The sanctuary is located in “the natural hallow of a rock” of the Kangarli region. Iydali Piri symbolizes mythological beliefs of the Azerbaijani people - water and fire. The sanctuary was established approximately in the 2nd – 1st centuries B.C.

== See also ==
Tourism in Azerbaijan
