= Anwara Khatun =

Bengali politician

Member of the Bengal Legislative Assembly
- In office 1946–1947
- Preceded by: Farhat Banu
- Constituency: Women's (Dacca)

Personal details
- Born: 1925 Mirpur, Dacca, Bengal Presidency
- Died: 1988 (aged 62–63)
- Party: All-India Muslim League; Awami League
- Spouse: Ali Amzad Khan

Anwara Khatun (Bengali: আনোয়ারা খাতুন) was a Bengali politician and member of provincial assembly.

== Early life ==
Khatun was born in 1925 in Mirpur, Dacca, Bengal Presidency. She was married off when she was six years old. She completed a bachelor's degree in law and another in technology after which she completed her master's degree in art.

== Career ==
Khatun was elected to the Bengal Legislative Assembly in 1946. She had hosted Huseyn Shaheed Suhrawardy at her house when he came to Dhaka in 1948. She was invited to join the Shorbodolio Rashtrabhasha Shangram Parishad by Kazi Golam Mahbub. She was an activist of the Bengali language movement. She spoke in the assembly against the death of students protesting for making Bengali a state language of Pakistan in police action. She was expelled from the Muslim League. She attended the conference in Rose Garden which led to the creation of Awami League.

Khatun was re-elected to the East Bengal Provincial Assembly in 1954 as a candidate of the United Front.

Khatun led the Awami League in 1966 when the male leadership party was imprisoned.

== Personal life ==
Khatun's husband, Ali Amzad Khan, was a founder of the Awami League.

== Death ==
Khatun died in 1988.
