= Aza Bridge =

Aza bridge Aza körpüsü
- Coordinates: 38°55′45″N 45°49′21″E
- Crosses: Gilanchai river

Characteristics
- Material: Stone
- Total length: 46 meters
- Width: 3.5 meters

History
- Construction end: XVII century
- Rebuilt: 1997

Location
- Interactive map of Aza bridge

Aza Bridge is a historical architectural monument located in the village of Azadkənd in the Ordubad District of Azerbaijan, built during the Safavid period.

The bridge was included in the list of architectural monuments of national importance by Decision No. 132 of the Cabinet of Ministers of the Republic of Azerbaijan dated August 2, 2001, and Decision No. 98 of the Cabinet of Ministers of the Nakhchivan Autonomous Republic dated November 21, 2007.

== History ==
Aza Bridge was built in the 17th century over the Gilanchay River in the village of Azadkənd, Ordubad District.Connecting the villages of Azadkənd and Darkend, the bridge is 3.5 meters wide and 46 pogonometric meters long.It has five spans and is constructed from reddish hewn local mountain stone. During its construction, the terrain was taken into account, and the distances between the arches were made in varying sizes. Four of the arches are equipped with wave breakers. The bridge was built during the reign of the Safavid ruler Shah Abbas I to facilitate the movement of trade caravans traveling along the Silk Road from east to west and vice versa.

After Azerbaijan regained its independence, the bridge was included in the list of immovable historical and cultural monuments of local importance by Decision No. 132 of the Cabinet of Ministers of the Republic of Azerbaijan dated August 2, 2001. The bridge suffered damage due to natural disasters and certain historical events over various periods. As strong floodwaters washed away part of the bridge, it underwent major restoration in 1997.

By Decision No. 98 of the Cabinet of Ministers of the Nakhchivan Autonomous Republic dated November 21, 2007, the Aza Bridge was included in the list of architectural monuments of national importance.

The bridge remains functional. Residents and vehicles traveling from Nakhchivan and Ordubad to the village of Azadkənd use this bridge.

== See also ==
- Architecture of Azerbaijan
