= 2008–09 Bangladesh women's Tri-Nation Series =

International cricket tournament

- Date: 6–17 February 2009
- Location: Bangladesh
- Result: Sri Lanka won the series
- Player of the series: (Sri Lanka) Chamari Polgampola
Teams
| Bangladesh | Pakistan | Sri Lanka |
Captains
| Salma Khatun | Urooj Mumtaz | Shashikala Siriwardene |
Most runs
| Ayasha Rahman (82) | Nain Abidi (146) | Dedunu Silva (158) |
Most wickets
| Salma Khatun (5) | Javeria Khan (14) | Chamari Polgampola (14) |

The 2008–09 Bangladesh women's Tri-Nation series was a cricket tournament that was held from 6 to 17 February 2009 in Bangladesh. It was a tri-nation series featuring Bangladesh women, Pakistan women and Sri Lanka women, with the second, third and the final matches played as Women's One Day Internationals (WODIs). As Bangladesh women had not received ODI status when the tournament was being held, the matches involving Bangladesh women were not played with WODI status.

The WODI fixtures were originally the part of Pakistan and Sri Lanka's preparation for the 2009 Women's Cricket World Cup. Grameenphone, the country's leading mobile phone operator, earned the right to sponsor the women's tri-nation series.

The hosts started their campaign disappointingly as they lost the inaugural match of the series by 7 wickets against Pakistan women. Sri Lanka women were the first team to qualify for the final, after they beat Pakistan women by 115 runs and won their three consecutive matches in the tournament.

Bangladesh women won their only match of the tournament, on 13 February 2009 by 6 wickets, when they bowled out Sri Lanka women for just 67 runs, to keep the final hopes alive. However, in the following match, Pakistan women restricted Bangladesh to 94 runs in the first innings, and beat the hosts by 9 wickets to reach the final. Sri Lanka women won by 6 wickets in the final match against Pakistan, and was crowned as the champions of the tri-nation series.

== Squads ==
| Bangladesh | Pakistan | Sri Lanka |
|---|---|---|
| Salma Khatun (c); Shathira Jakir (vc); Ayasha Rahman; Champa Chakma; Fatema Jahara; Irin Sultana; Jahanara Alam; Lata Mondal; Lily Rani Biswas; Mina Khatun; Panna Ghosh; Shamima Akhtar; Shukhtara Rahman | Urooj Mumtaz (c); Sana Mir (vc); Almas Akram; Armaan Khan; Asmavia Iqbal; Batool Fatima; Bismah Maroof; Javeria Khan; Nahida Khan; Naila Nazir; Nain Abidi; Qanita Jalil; Sajjida Shah; Sania Khan; Sukhan Faiz | Shashikala Siriwardene (c); Suwini de Alwis; Hiruka Fernando; Rose Fernando; Inoka Galagedara; Eshani Kaushalya; Chamari Polgampola; Udeshika Prabodhani; Deepika Rasangika; Deepika Rasangika; Dedunu Silva; Dilani Manodara; Sripali Weerakkody; Chandi Wickramasinghe |

== Points table ==
| Team | P | W | L | T | NR | Pts | NRR |
|---|---|---|---|---|---|---|---|
| Sri Lanka | 4 | 3 | 1 | 0 | 0 | 15 | +1.160 |
| Pakistan | 4 | 2 | 1 | 1 | 0 | 10 | –0.218 |
| Bangladesh | 4 | 1 | 3 | 0 | 0 | 5 | –0.893 |

advanced to the Final

== Fixtures ==
=== 1st Match ===
6 February 2009
Scorecard

| Bangladesh; 109 (46.1 overs) | v | Pakistan; 110/3 (33.4 overs) |
| Lata Mondal 26 (60); Javeria Khan 3/20 (8 overs) | | Nain Abidi 65 (96); Shukhtara Rahman 1/6 (1.4 overs) |

Pakistan Women won by 7 wickets
Shaheed Chandu Stadium, Bogra
Umpires: Shishir Chowdhury (Ban) and Ziaul Islam (Ban)
Player of the match: Nain Abidi (Pakistan Women)

- Pakistan Women won the toss and elected to field.
- Points: Pakistan Women 5, Bangladesh Women 0.

=== 2nd Match ===
7 February 2009
Scorecard

| Pakistan; 103 (41.5 overs) | v | Sri Lanka; 105/7 (30.4 overs) |
| Armaan Khan 25 (51); Chamani Seneviratna 3/26 (8 overs) | | Hiruka Fernando 23 (39); Almas Akram 3/17 (4 overs) |

Sri Lanka Women won by 3 wickets
Shaheed Chandu Stadium, Bogra
Umpires: Mizanur Rahman (Ban) and Ziaul Islam (Ban)
Player of the match: Chamani Seneviratna (Sri Lanka Women)

- Sri Lanka women won the toss and elected to field.
- Nahida Khan (Pakistan Women) made her WODI debut.
- Points: Sri Lanka Women 5, Pakistan Women 0.

=== 3rd Match ===
9 February 2009
Scorecard

| Sri Lanka; 211/9 (50 overs) | v | Bangladesh; 135 (47.5 overs) |
| Eshani Lokusuriyage 60* (43); Shohely Akhter 3/23 (10 overs) | | Ayasha Rahman 33 (90); Chamari Polgampola 3/26 (10 overs) |

Sri Lanka Women won by 76 runs
Shaheed Chandu Stadium, Bogra
Umpires: Shishir Chowdhury (Ban) and Ziaul Islam (Ban)
Player of the match: Eshani Lokusuriyage (Sri Lanka Women)

- Sri Lanka Women won the toss and elected to bat.
- Points: Sri Lanka Women 5, Bangladesh Women 0.

=== 4th Match ===
12 February 2009
Scorecard

| Sri Lanka; 207/9 (34 overs) | v | Pakistan; 92 (33.3 overs) |
| Shashikala Siriwardene 66 (72); Asmavia Iqbal 2/23 (4 overs) | | Bismah Maroof 18 (35); Suwini de Alwis 3/10 (7 overs) |

Sri Lanka Women won by 115 runs
Khulna Divisional Stadium, Khulna
Umpires: Aflajur Rahman (Ban) and Anisur Rahman (Ban)
Player of the match: Shashikala Siriwardene (Sri Lanka Women)

- Pakistan Women won the toss and elected to field.
- The match was reduced to 34 overs per side due to rain.
- Sania Khan (Pakistan Women) made his WODI debut.
- Points: Sri Lanka Women 5, Pakistan Women 0.

=== 5th Match ===
13 February 2009
Scorecard

| Sri Lanka; 67 (23.2 overs) | v | Bangladesh; 71/4 (31.3 overs) |
| Dedunu Silva 26 (38); Shamima Akhter 3/23 (8 overs) | | Ayasha Rahman 24 (87); Shashikala Siriwardene 2/16 (10 overs) |

Bangladesh Women won by 6 wickets
Khulna Divisional Stadium, Khulna
Umpires: Anisur Rahman (Ban) and Masudur Rahman (Ban)
Player of the match: Shamima Akhter (Bangladesh Women)

- Bangladesh Women won the toss and elected to field
- Points: Bangladesh Women 5, Sri Lanka Women 0.

=== 6th Match ===
14 February 2009
Scorecard

| Bangladesh; 94 (34.4 overs) | v | Pakistan; 96/1 (20.1 overs) |
| Ayasha Rahman 21 (64); Sana Mir 2/12 (7 overs) | | Bismah Maroof 41* (50); Salma Khatun 1/25 (8 overs) |

Pakistan Women won by 9 wickets
Khulna Divisional Stadium, Khulna
Umpires: Afjalur Rahman (Ban) and Masudur Ragman (Ban)
Player of the match: Bismah Maroof (Pakistan Women)

- Pakistan Women won the toss and elected to field.
- Points: Pakistan Women 5, Bangladesh Women 0.

== Final ==
17 February 2009
Scorecard

| Pakistan {{{score1}}} | v | Sri Lanka {{{score2}}} |

Sri Lanka Women won by 6 wickets
Sher-e-Bangla National Cricket Stadium, Mirpur
Umpires: Manzur Rahman (Ban) and Ziaul Islam (Ban)
Player of the match: Chamari Polgampola (Sri Lanka Women)

- Sri Lanka Women won the toss and elected to field.
- Naila Nazir (Pakistan Women) made his WODI debut.
- Sri Lanka Women won the 2008–09 Bangladesh women's Tri-Nation Series.
