= Taj Khatun =

Taj Khatun or Taj Khatoon (Persian: تاج خاتون) may refer to:

- Taj Khatun, Qom
- Taj Khatun, West Azerbaijan

== See also ==
- Khatun (disambiguation)
