= Daulatunnesa Khatun =

Bangladeshi politician

Member of Bangladesh Parliament
- In office 18 February 1979 – 12 February 1982

Personal details
- Born: 1918 Sonatala, Bogra District, British India
- Died: 4 August 1997 (aged 78–79)
- Party: Bangladesh Nationalist Party

Daulatunnesa Khatun (Bengali: দৌলতুননেসা খাতুন; 1918 - 4 August 1997) was a Bangladesh Nationalist Party politician and member of the Bangladesh Parliament in a women's reserved seat.

== Biography ==
Daulatunnesa Khatun was born in 1918 in Sonatala, Bogra District, British India.

Khatun was elected in 1979 to a seat in parliament reserved for women as a Bangladesh Nationalist Party candidate.

She died on 4 August 1997.
