= Rashida Khatun =

Bangladeshi politician

Member of Bangladesh Parliament
- In office 1991–1996

Personal details
- Party: Bangladesh Jamaat-e-Islami

Rashida Khatun is a Bangladesh Jamaat-e-Islami politician and a former member of parliament from a reserved seat.

== Career ==
Khatun was elected to parliament from a reserved seat as a Bangladesh Nationalist Party candidate in 1991.
