= Muskan Khatun =

Nepalese activist

- मुस्कान खातुन
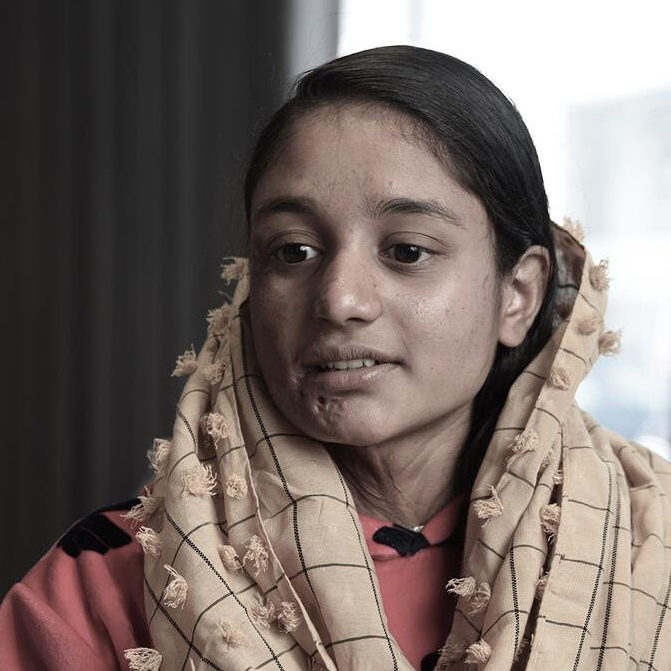
- Born: May 11, 2004 (age 22)
- Occupation: human rights activist
- Known for: International Women of Courage Award in 2021

Muskan Khatun (Nepali: मुस्कान खातुन; born 11 May 2004) is a Nepalese human rights activist. She was a survivor of an acid attack at the age of 15 after she refused the boy's romantic advances. She has campaigned for legislation and was instrumental in getting laws passed for tough action against perpetrators in Nepal. She won an International Women of Courage Award in 2021.

Muskan Khatun from Chhapakaiya in Birgunj was attacked with acid by 16-year-old Samsad Miya in order to exact revenge after Khatun rebuffed his friend Majid Alam’s romantic overtures, according to police.

== Life ==
She was born in 2004. When she was fifteen she rebuffed the advances of a boy who was a year older than her. He was a relative of hers and he had been warned off by Khatun's father at her request. The spurned admirer was angry and he asked his friend to demand to know why she was not speaking to him. The friend was instructed to wait for a reply and if none was given then she should have acid thrown at her.

The incident happened when both boys were present and Khatun merely replied that she was late for school. The acid was thrown and it landed on her face, hands and body. Her friends arranged for her to be taken to hospital. One boy was arrested and the other ran away.

She had a painful recovery, but she used her position to lobby for change. She campaigned for legislation and was instrumental in getting laws passed for tough action against perpetrators. She met Nepal's Prime Minister K.P. Oli and he agreed to strengthen the laws concerning acid attacks and to restrict the sale of chemicals. The new laws were created but some doubt was expressed about their effectiveness.

She won an International Women of Courage Award in 2021. She was nominated by the US ambassador David M. Satterfield and the awards were made by the First Lady Jill Biden and the US Secretary of State Tony Blinken on International Women's Day.

== Awards ==
- International Women of Courage (IWOC) Award
