= Cheshmeh Khatun =

Cheshmeh Khatun چشمه خاتون
- Village
- Location within Iran
- Coordinates: 31°49′52″N 50°02′15″E
- Country: Iran
- Province: Khuzestan
- County: Izeh
- Bakhsh: Central
- Rural District: Howmeh-ye Sharqi

Population (2006)
  - Total: 49
- Time zone: UTC+3:30 (IRST)
  - Summer (DST): UTC+4:30 (IRDT)

Cheshmeh Khatun (Persian: چشمه خاتون, also Romanized as Cheshmeh Khātūn) is a village in Howmeh-ye Sharqi Rural District, in the Central District of Izeh County, Khuzestan Province, Iran. At the 2006 census, its population was 49, in ten families.
