= Hamisi Abdallah =

Tanzanian cricketer (born 1987)

Personal information
- Born: 28 October 1987 (age 39); Dar es Salaam, Tanzania

International information
- National side: Tanzania
- Source: Cricinfo, 19 July 2015

Hamisi Abdallah (born 28 October 1987) is a Tanzanian cricketer. He played in the 2014 ICC World Cricket League Division Five tournament.
