= Anoyara Khatun =

Indian children's rights activist

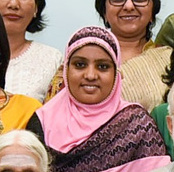
- Anoyara Khatun during the Narishakti Puruskar award ceremony
- Born: c. 1996 (age 29–30)
- Occupation: Student
- Known for: Saving children from child trafficking, child labour and child marriage

Anoyara Khatun (born c. 1996) is an Indian children's rights advocate. In 2017, at the age of 21 years, she was conferred India's highest civilian award for women, the Narishakti Puruskar, for her contributions to fighting child trafficking and child marriage in the state of West Bengal.

== Life ==
Anoyara Khatun was born in a below-poverty-line family in Choto Asgara village, Sandeshkhali, rural North 24 Parganas district, West Bengal in 1996. She lost her father at an early age, and when she was twelve she was taken to New Delhi where she worked as a domestic help. After a few months as a domestic worker, she escaped and returned to her village and found the condition of children in it terrible. Children were being forced into labour, and some were trafficked to the cities and over the border into Bangladesh, while others were forced into child marriage. With the intention of changing the situation around her, she came in contact with 'Dhagagia Social Welfare Society' and Save the Children, where she learnt the concept of child rights. To reach out to a larger number of people, she initiated the process of forming groups which would be self-reliant in child rights. Within a short period of time Anoyara helped to reunite 180 trafficked children with their families, stopped nearly three dozen child marriages, rescued 85 children from child labour and got 400 children back into school.

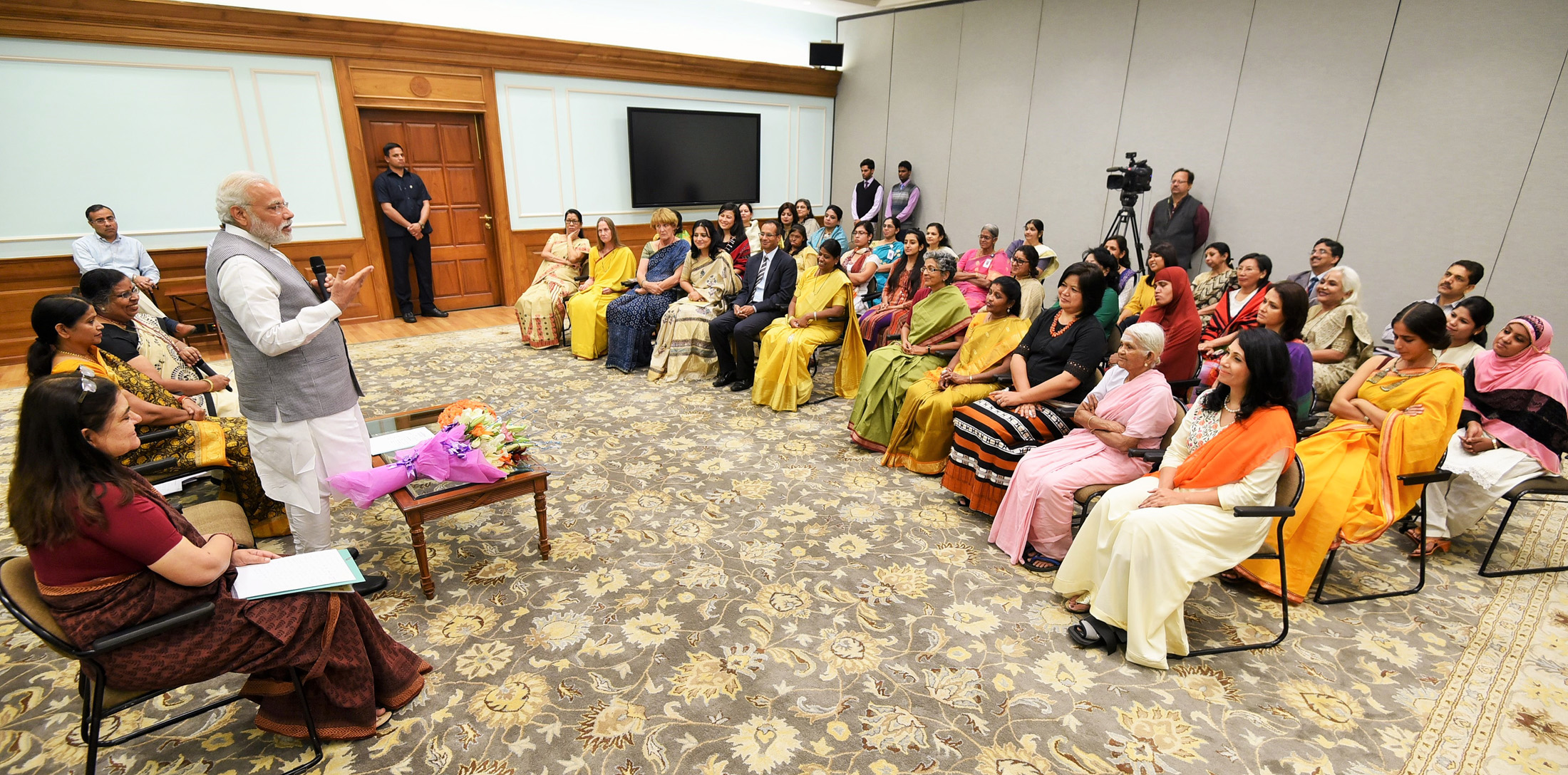
The Prime Minister interacting with the recipients of Nari Shakti Puraskar 2016. Anoyara Khatun can be seen far right. Also visible is Maneka Gandhi.

In 2011, Mamata Banerjee felicitated her. In 2012, Anoyara emerged as one of the three nominees for International Children's Peace Prize. On 8 March 2017, International Women's Day, Anoyara Khatun was conferred India's highest civilian award for women, the Narishakti Puruskar, for the year 2016, for her contributions to fighting child trafficking and child marriage in the state of West Bengal. Anoyara Khatun has been invited to participate in the United Nations General Assembly in 2015 and 2016 as an advocate of children's rights.
