= Sayeeda Khatun =

Indian politician

Member of Parliament, Rajya Sabha
- In office 1986–1992
- Constituency: Madhya Pradesh

Personal details
- Born: 15 January 1944
- Party: Indian National Congress

Sayeeda Khatun is an Indian politician. She was a Member of Parliament, representing Madhya Pradesh in the Rajya Sabha the upper house of India's Parliament as a member of the Indian National Congress.
