= Kazi Golam Mahbub =

Bangladeshi politician

- Born: 23 December 1927; Kasba Village, Backergunge District, Bengal Presidency, British India
- Died: 19 March 2006 (aged 78); Dhaka, Bangladesh
- Education: Maulana Azad College; University of Dhaka

Kazi Golam Mahbub (23 December 1927 – 19 March 2006) was a Bangladeshi activist and politician. He participated in the Language Movement that took place in the erstwhile East Pakistan.

== Early life and education ==
Mahbub was born in Kasba village in Backergunge District (now Barisal District). His father, Kazi Abdul Majed, was an activist of 1921 movement which was carried out in Barisal for achieving a more equitable arrangement for farmers. Mahbub matriculated from Barisal Torki High School in 1942 and then went to Calcutta Islamia College for pursuing graduation. After completing Bachelor of Arts, He migrated to Dhaka in 1947. In 1948, he got admitted to the law department of the University of Dhaka as an LL.B student and later graduated with a Bachelor of Laws.

== Career ==
In the same year, he founded the East Pakistan Muslim Chhatra League. In January 1952, he was elected as convener of the All Party State Language Action Committee.

Mahbub was a member of the central committee of the provincial unit of Awami League between 1949 and 1968 and the general secretary of the greater Barisal District unit of Awami League in 1953. He joined Bangladesh Nationalist Party in 1978 and served as the vice chairman of the party.

Mahbub was elected the president of Supreme Court Bar Association in 1993–94.

== Legacy ==
On 10 December 2006, the Mayor of Dhaka renamed the old Road No 10 of Dhanmondi Residential Area in Dhaka after Mahbub.

== Awards ==
- Principal Abul Kashem Rashtra-bhasha Gold Medal (1993)
- Jatiyatabadi Sanskritik Jot Padak (1998)
- Matri-bhasha Padak of Tamuddun Majlish (2000)
- Ekushey Padak (2002)
- Bhasha Sainik Padak of Bangladesh Awami League (2002)
