= Khatun Gonay =

Khatun Gonay خاتون گناي
- Village
- Location within Iran
- Coordinates: 36°56′54″N 47°00′38″E
- Country: Iran
- Province: East Azerbaijan
- County: Charuymaq
- Bakhsh: Central
- Rural District: Charuymaq-e Jonubegharbi

Population (2006)
  - Total: 27
- Time zone: UTC+3:30 (IRST)
  - Summer (DST): UTC+4:30 (IRDT)

Khatun Gonay (Persian: خاتون گناي, also romanized as Khātūn Gonāy and Khātūn Ganāy) is a village in Charuymaq-e Jonubegharbi Rural District, in the Central District of Charuymaq County, East Azerbaijan Province, Iran. Its population was 27 with just 5 families as per the 2006 census.
