= Gilançay =

- Municipality
- Location within Azerbaijan
- Coordinates: 39°00′22″N 45°49′07″E
- Country: Azerbaijan
- Autonomous republic: Nakhchivan
- District: Ordubad

Population (2005)
  - Total: 287
- Time zone: UTC+4 (AZT)

Gilançay (also, Gilanchay and Kilyanchay) is a village and municipality in the Ordubad District of Nakhchivan, Azerbaijan. It is located in the left side of the Ordubad-Khurs highway, 31 km in the north-west from the district center, on the left bank of the Gilanchay River. Its population is busy with gardening, vegetable-growing and animal husbandry. There are secondary school, library, club and a medical center in the village. It has a population of 287.

== Etymology ==
The village in the administrative territorial unit of the Parağa of the Ordubad region. It is at the foothill area. The name of the settlement is related with the name of the river of Gilanchay in the area.
