= Amiraddin Masud Nakhchivani =

- Born: 12th century
- Known for: Architect

Amiraddin Masud Nakhchivani was a 12th-century architect, native from the lands that later became the Nakhchivan Autonomous Republic of Azerbaijan.

He was indeed a representative of the architectural school of Nakhchivan. He lived in a palace of the Eldiguzids and was the follower of the architectural style of Ajami Nakhchivani. He constructed both religious and public buildings. He also had poetical abilities.
