= Joe Scuderi =

Australian-born cricketer (born 1968)

Personal information
- Full name: Joseph Charles Scuderi
- Born: 24 December 1968 (age 57); Ingham, Queensland, Australia
- Batting: Right-handed
- Bowling: Right-arm fast-medium
- Role: All rounder

International information
- National side: Italy

Domestic team information
- Years: Team
- 1988/89–1997/98: South Australia
- 1988/89: Queensland
- 2000–2001: Lancashire

Career statistics
| Competition | First-class | List A |
|---|---|---|
| Matches | 82 | 64 |
| Runs scored | 3,372 | 893 |
| Batting average | 30.10 | 23.50 |
| 100s/50s | 3/17 | 0/5 |
| Top score | 125* | 73* |
| Balls bowled | 13,190 | 2,501 |
| Wickets | 179 | 50 |
| Bowling average | 33.92 | 38.96 |
| 5 wickets in innings | 8 | – |
| 10 wickets in match | 1 | – |
| Best bowling | 7/79 | 3/28 |
| Catches/stumpings | 26/– | 9/– |
- Source: CricketArchive, 16 October 2011

Joseph Charles Scuderi (born 24 December 1968) is an Australian-born former cricketer and coach.

From a young age, Scuderi showed potential as an all-rounder, being inducted into the Australian Cricket Academy in Adelaide, South Australia. Queensland and South Australia sought to recruit him, with South Australia winning Scuderi's services, and he made his debut for South Australia in the 1988/89 season.

Scuderi was a regular for South Australia from 1988 until 1999. During that time, he played in two Prime Minister's XI matches and was selected in the provisional World Cup squad in 1992. He signed a two-year deal in 2000 to play for Lancashire in the English County Championship. Scuderi also joined the Italian national cricket team (he is of Italian heritage), where he became captain/coach until 2008 and then coach until 2016.

Scuderi now lives in Lancashire and is a professional cricket coach.

Sporting positions
| Preceded by Brendon Julian | Nelson Cricket Club professional 1991–1996 | Succeeded by Alan Dawson |
| Preceded by Wade Wingfield | Nelson Cricket Club professional 2002–2003 | Succeeded by Cameron Cuffy |
