= Laila Nur =

Bangladeshi academic and activist (1934–2019)

- Born: October 5, 1934; Daudkandi, Comilla, British India
- Died: May 31, 2019 (aged 84)
- Education: Dhaka University
- Occupation: Professor
- Organization: Comilla Victoria Government College
- Movement: Bengali language movement

Laila Nur (October 5, 1934 – May 31, 2019) was a Bangladeshi language-movement activist and academic. She joined Comilla Victoria Government College in 1957 as its first female professor.

== Early life ==
Laila Nur was born on 5 October 1934 in Daudkandi Thana, Comilla. Her father was Abu Naser, a medical doctor, and her mother was Shamsunnahar Mehedi. She passed her Higher Secondary School Certificate (HSC) in 1952. She received a Bachelor of Arts degree in English literature in 1956 from Dhaka University.

== Participation in the Language Movement ==
As a young woman in 1952, Nur participated in the Bengali language movement. On 20 February 1955 she was arrested by the Pakistan Police along with about 20 female students for preparing to take part in a march the next day. She was in jail for 21 days for her participation in the Language Movement.

== Professional achievements ==
In 1957, Nur became the first woman to be appointed a professor at Comilla Victoria Government College.

Nur has translated 115 poetry pieces by Titas Chowdhury into English.

In 2014, Nur received the Binoy Sommanona Award for her contribution to the Language Movement and education.
