= Chenar Khatun =

Chenar Khatun چنارخاتون
- Village
- Location within Iran
- Coordinates: 33°35′56″N 49°01′13″E
- Country: Iran
- Province: Lorestan
- County: Dorud
- Bakhsh: Central
- Rural District: Dorud

Population (2006)
  - Total: 68
- Time zone: UTC+3:30 (IRST)
  - Summer (DST): UTC+4:30 (IRDT)

Chenar Khatun (Persian: چنارخاتون, also Romanized as Chenār Khātūn) is a village in Dorud Rural District, in the Central District of Dorud County, Lorestan Province, Iran. At the 2006 census, its population was 68, in 14 families.
