= Zobeda Khatun Parul =

Bangladeshi politician

- জ়োবেদা খাতুন পারুল

Member of Bangladesh Parliament
- In office 2009–2014

Personal details
- Party: Bangladesh Awami League

Zobeda Khatun Parul (Bengali: জ়োবেদা খাতুন পারুল, Bengali pronunciation: [zobeda kʰatun parul]) is a Bangladesh Awami League politician and a former member of Bangladesh Parliament from a reserved seat.

== Career ==
Parul was elected to parliament from reserved seat as a Bangladesh Awami League candidate in 2009.
