= Tabriz Khatun =

Tabriz Khatun تبريزخاتون
- Village
- Location within Iran
- Coordinates: 35°53′49″N 46°50′35″E
- Country: Iran
- Province: Kurdistan
- County: Divandarreh
- Bakhsh: Central
- Rural District: Chehel Cheshmeh

Population (2006)
  - Total: 235
- Time zone: UTC+3:30 (IRST)
  - Summer (DST): UTC+4:30 (IRDT)

Tabriz Khatun (Persian: تبريزخاتون, also Romanized as Tabrīz Khātūn) is a village in Chehel Cheshmeh Rural District, in the Central District of Divandarreh County, Kurdistan Province, Iran. At the 2006 census, its population was 235, in 47 families. The village is populated by Kurds.
