= Shorbodolio Kendrio Rashtrobhasha Kormi Porishod =

Leading organisation in the Bengali language movement

The Shorbodolio Kendrio Rashtrobhasha Kormi Porishod (All-Parties Central Language Action Committee) was the leading political organisation in the Bengali language movement of East Bengal.

The organisation was formed in an all-party meeting chaired by Maulana Bhasani of the Awami Muslim League, on January 31, 1952, at the Bar Library Hall of Dhaka University. Attendees included representatives of the Youth League, East Pakistan Muslim Students League, Dhaka University State Language Action Committee, East Pakistan Awami Muslim League, Tamaddun Majlish, All East Pakistan Students League, Islamic Brotherhood, and East Pakistan Mohajir Society.

The meeting formed the 40-member Shorbodolio Kendrio Rashtrabhasha Koarmiporishod to direct the movement for Bengali as a state language. Kazi Golam Mahbub, general secretary of the East Pakistan Students League, was elected as convener of the Committee. Resolutions demanded Bengali as one of the state languages of Pakistan, denounced the attempt to introduce Arabic script for Bengali, supported a general strike, and called for the release of political prisoners.
