= Bibi Khatun, Bushehr =

Bibi Khatun بي بي خاتون
- Village
- Location within Iran
- Coordinates: 27°50′24″N 51°49′48″E
- Country: Iran
- Province: Bushehr
- County: Deyr
- Bakhsh: Central
- Rural District: Howmeh

Population (2006)
  - Total: 29
- Time zone: UTC+3:30 (IRST)
  - Summer (DST): UTC+4:30 (IRDT)

Bibi Khatun (Persian: بي بي خاتون, also Romanized as Bībī Khātūn) is a village in Howmeh Rural District, in the Central District of Deyr County, Bushehr Province, Iran. At the 2006 census, its population was 29, in 6 families.
