= Mina Khatun =

Bangladeshi cricketer (born 1986)

Personal information
- Full name: Mina Khatun
- Born: 20 October 1986 (age 40); Chittagong, Bangladesh
- Batting: Right-handed
- Role: Wicket-keeper

Domestic team information
- Years: Team
- 2008/09–2010/11: Rajshahi Division
- Source: CricketArchive, 17 April 2022

Mina Khatun (Bengali: মিনা খাতুন) (born 20 October 1986) is a Bangladeshi former cricketer who played as a right-handed batter and wicket-keeper. She played for Bangladesh between 2007 and 2009, before the team was granted full international status. She played domestic cricket for Rajshahi Division.
