= Halima Khatun =

Bangladeshi activist, writer, and academic (1933–2018)

- হালিমা খাতুন
- Born: 25 August 1933; Bagerhat, Bengal Presidency, British India
- Died: 3 July 2018 (aged 84); Dhaka, Bangladesh
- Education: University of Dhaka; Rajshahi University; University of Northern Colorado

Halima Khatun (25 August 1933 – 3 July 2018) was a Bangladeshi activist, writer and academic. She took part in the Bengali language movement in 1952 along with other activists including Rawshan Ara Bachchu. She was a recipient of the Bangla Academy Literary Award in 1981 and posthumously received the Ekushey Padak award in 2019.

== Early life and education ==
Khatun was born in Bagerhat in the then British India to Maulovi Abdur Rahman and Doulatunnesa. She completed her master's in English literature from the University of Dhaka and later in Bengali from Rajshahi University. She earned her PhD in education from the University of Northern Colorado in 1968.

== Career ==
Khatun began her teaching career at Khulna Coronation School and RK Girls College. She later joined the Education Research Institute of the University of Dhaka until her retirement in 1997.

== Awards ==
- Bangla Academy Literary Award (1981)
- Bangladesh Shishu Academy Sahitya Puraskar (1999)
- Anannya Top Ten Award (2005)
- Ekushey Padak (2019)

== Personal life ==
Khatun's only daughter, Progga Laboni, is a notable recitation artist and a book publisher. Her niece, Suborna Mustafa, is an actress.
