= Bibi Khatun, Kohgiluyeh and Boyer-Ahmad =

Bibi Khatun بي بي خاتون
- Village
- Location within Iran
- Coordinates: 30°56′41″N 51°07′47″E
- Country: Iran
- Province: Kohgiluyeh and Boyer-Ahmad
- County: Boyer-Ahmad
- Bakhsh: Margown
- Rural District: Margown

Population (2006)
  - Total: 320
- Time zone: UTC+3:30 (IRST)
  - Summer (DST): UTC+4:30 (IRDT)

Bibi Khatun (Persian: بي بي خاتون, also Romanized as Bībī Khātūn; also known as Bībī Khātūneyn and Bī Bī Khātūnīn) is a village in Margown Rural District, Margown District, Boyer-Ahmad County, Kohgiluyeh and Boyer-Ahmad Province, Iran. At the 2006 census, its population was 320, in 63 families.
