= Shafia Khatun =

Bangladeshi politician

Member of Bangladesh Parliament
- In office 2009–2014

Personal details
- Party: Bangladesh Awami League

Shafia Khatun is a Bangladesh Awami League politician and a former member of parliament from a reserved seat.

== Career ==
Khatun was elected to parliament from a reserved seat as a Bangladesh Awami League candidate in 2009. She served as the president of the Bangladesh Mohila Awami League from 2017 to 2022.

After the fall of the Sheikh Hasina-led Awami League government, Khatun was detained from the Balughat area of Pallabi Thana on 30 November 2024. She was jailed in connection with the death of a protester against Sheikh Hasina.
