= Rawshan Ara Bachchu =

Bangladeshi activist (1932–2019)

- রওশন আরা বাচ্চু
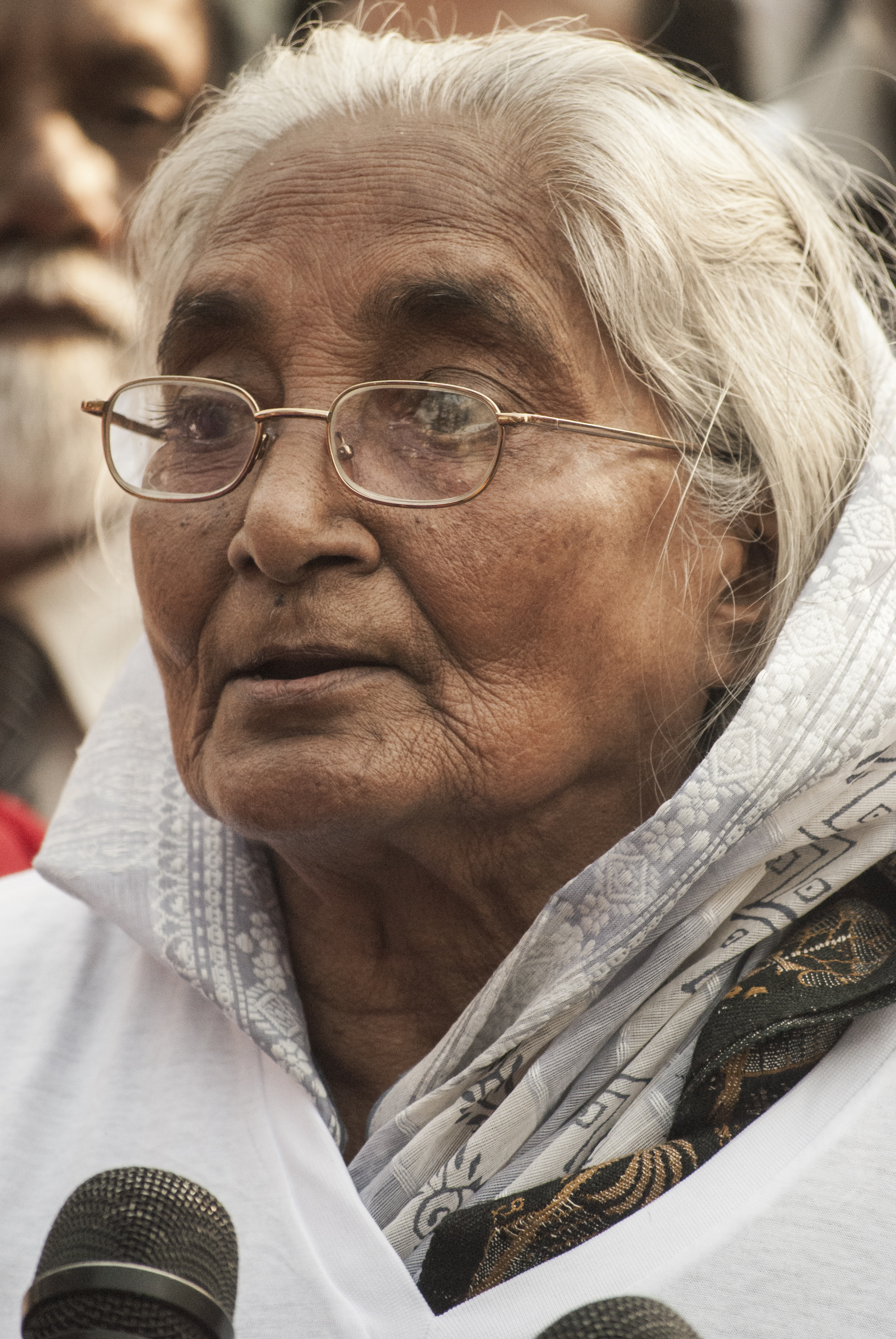
- Bachchu in 2012
- Born: 17 December 1932; Kulaura, Moulvibazar , Greater Sylhet, Assam Province, British India
- Died: 3 December 2019 (aged 86); Dhaka, Bangladesh

Rawshan Ara Bachchu (17 December 1932 – 3 December 2019) was a Bangladeshi activist. She took part in Bengali language movement in 1952. She was awarded Anannya Top Ten Awards in 2009.

== Early life ==
Bachchu's family originated from Kulaura in Moulvibazar District. She was a student of Brojomohun College. In 1947, at the initiative of the university students and Tamaddun Majlish, she along with 7 or 8 other students formed the State Language Action Council.

== Death ==
Bachchu died on 3 December 2019.
