= Language Movement Day =

National holiday of Bangladesh

Language Movement Day ভাষা আন্দোলন দিবস
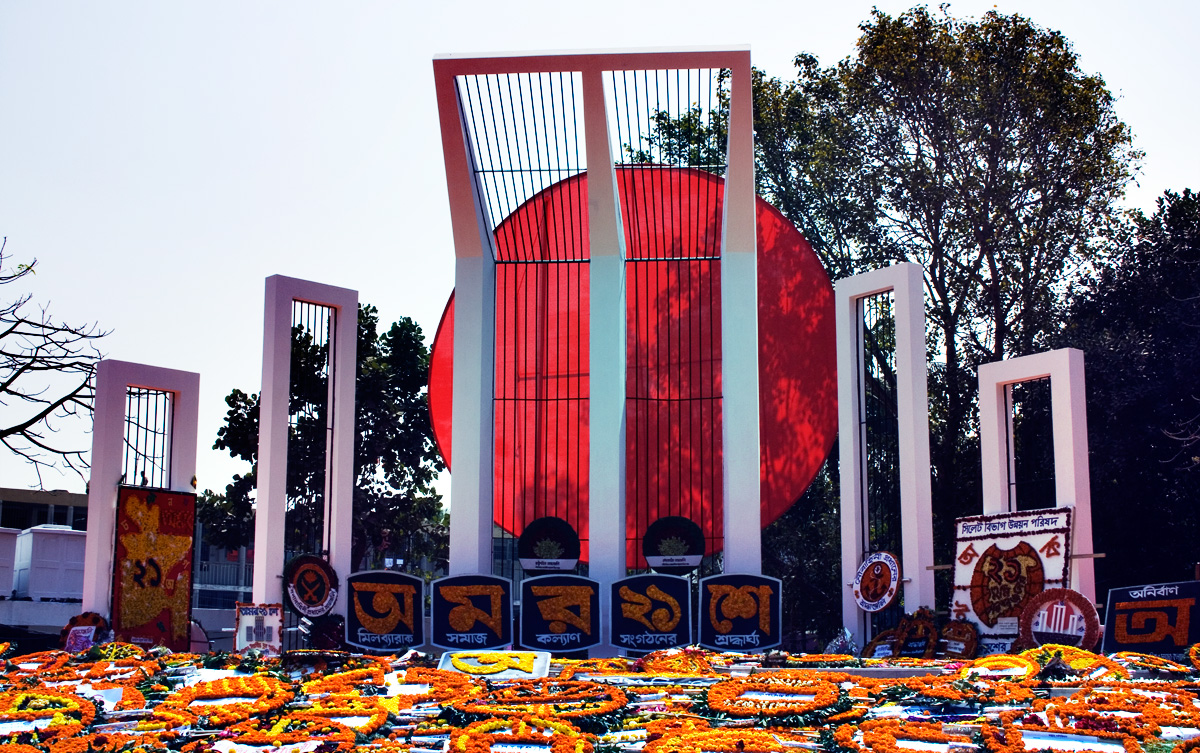
- The Shaheed Minar monument commemorates those who lost their lives during the protests on 21 February 1952.
- Official name: Language Martyrs' Day (শহীদ দিবস)
- Also called: Language Movement Day (ভাষা আন্দোলন দিবস); 21st of February (একুশে ফেব্রুয়ারি)
- Observed by: Bangladesh and Bengali speakers in India and elsewhere
- Celebrations: Flag hoisting, parades, singing patriotic songs, the "Amar Bhaier Rokte Rangano", speeches by the President and Prime Minister, entertainment and cultural programs.
- Date: 21 February
- Frequency: Annual
- First time: 1955
- Related to: International Mother Language Day

The Language Movement Day (Bengali: ভাষা আন্দোলন দিবস, romanized: Bhāṣā Āndōlôn Dibôs), officially called Language Martyrs' Day (Bengali: শহীদ দিবস, romanized: Śôhīd Dibôs), is a national holiday of Bangladesh taking place on 21 February each year and commemorating the Bengali language movement and its martyrs. On this day, people visit Shaheed Minar to pay homage to the movement's martyrs and arrange seminars discussing and promoting Bengali as the state language of Bangladesh.

== Background ==
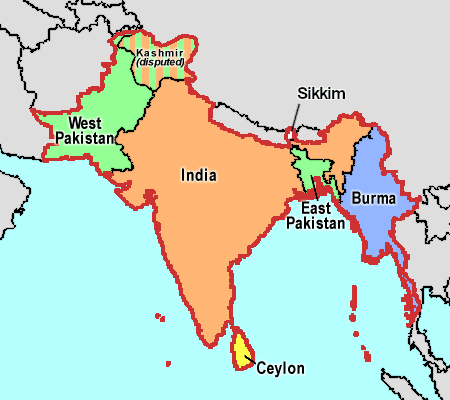
Britain's holdings on the Indian subcontinent were granted independence in 1947 and 1948, so becoming four new independent states: India, Burma, Ceylon, and Pakistan (including East Bengal, from 1971 Bangladesh).

After the partition of India in 1947, Bengali-speaking people in East Bengal, the non-contiguous eastern part of the Dominion of Pakistan, made up 44 million of the newly formed Dominion of Pakistan's 69 million people. The Dominion of Pakistan's government, civil services, and military, however, were dominated by personnel from the western wing of the Dominion of Pakistan. In 1947, a key resolution at a national education summit in Karachi advocated Urdu as the sole state language and its exclusive use in the media and in schools. Opposition and protests immediately arose. Students from Dhaka rallied under the leadership of Abul Kashem, the secretary of Tamaddun Majlish, a Bengali Islamic cultural organisation. The meeting stipulated Bengali as an official language of the Dominion of Pakistan and as a medium of education in East Bengal. However, the Pakistan Public Service Commission removed Bengali from the list of approved subjects, as well as from currency notes and stamps. The central education minister Fazlur Rahman made extensive preparations to make Urdu the only state language of the Dominion of Pakistan. Public outrage spread and a large number of Bengali students met on the University of Dhaka campus on 8 December 1947 to formally demand that Bengali be made an official language. To promote their cause, Bengali students organised processions and rallies in Dhaka. The language movement prompted the people of East Bengal (later East Pakistan) to establish a separate national identity, distinct from that of the remainder of Pakistan (later West Pakistan.)

== Protest ==
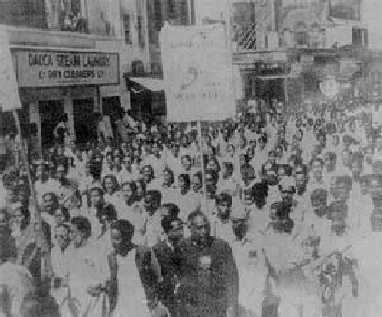
Procession march held on 21 February 1952 in Dhaka

At nine o'clock on the morning of 21 February 1952, students began gathering on the premises of the University of Dhaka in defiance of Section 144 of the penal code. The university vice-chancellor and other officials were present as armed police surrounded the campus. By a quarter past eleven, students gathered at the university gate and attempted to break the police line. Police fired tear gas shells towards the gate to warn the students. A section of students ran into the Dhaka Medical College while others rallied towards the university premises cordoned by the police. The vice-chancellor asked police to stop firing and ordered the students to leave the area. However, the police arrested several students for violating Section 144 as they attempted to leave. Enraged by the arrests, the students met around the East Bengal Legislative Assembly and blocked the legislators' way, asking them to present their insistence at the assembly. When a group of students sought to storm into the building, police opened fire and killed a number of students, including Abdus Salam, Rafiq Uddin Ahmed, Abul Barkat and Abdul Jabbar. As the news of the killings spread, disorder erupted across the city. Shops, offices and public transport were shut down and a general strike began. At the assembly, six legislators including Manoranjan Dhar, Boshontokumar Das, Shamsuddin Ahmed and Dhirendranath Datta requested that chief minister Nurul Amin visit wounded students in hospital and that the assembly be adjourned as a sign of mourning. This motion was supported by some of the treasury bench members including Maulana Abdur Rashid Tarkabagish, Shorfuddin Ahmed, Shamsuddin Ahmed Khondokar and Mosihuddin Ahmed. However Nurul Amin refused the requests.

== Effects ==
=== Constitutional reform ===
On 7 May 1954, the constituent assembly resolved, with the Muslim League's support, to grant official status to Bengali. Bengali was recognised as the second official language of Pakistan on 29 February 1956, and article 214(1) of the Constitution of Pakistan was amended to provide that "The state language of Pakistan shall be Urdu and Bengali."

However, the military government formed by Ayub Khan made attempts to re-establish Urdu as the sole national language. On 6 January 1959, the military regime issued an official statement and reinstated the official stance of supporting the 1956 constitution's policy of two state languages.

=== Independence of Bangladesh ===
Although the question of official languages was settled by 1956, the military regime of Ayub Khan promoted the interests of West Pakistan at the expense of East Pakistan. Despite being the majority of the national population, East Pakistanis remained underrepresented in civil and military services and received only a small share of state funding and government support. This was mainly due to lack of representative government in the fledgling state. Mainly due to regional economic imbalances sectional divisions grew, and support for the Bengali ethnic nationalist Awami League, which invoked the 6-point movement for greater provincial autonomy. One demand was that East Pakistan be called Bangladesh (Land/Country of Bengal), which subsequently led to the Bangladesh Liberation War.

== Commemoration ==
To commemorate this movement, Shaheed Minar, a solemn and symbolic sculpture, was erected in the place of the massacre.

Following the formation of the provincial government by the United Front in April 1954, the anniversary of 21 February was declared a holiday. The day is revered in Bangladesh where it is a public holiday and, to a somewhat lesser extent, in West Bengal as the Martyrs' Day.

UNESCO decided to observe 21 February as International Mother Language Day. The UNESCO General Conference took the decision that took effect on 17 November 1999, when it unanimously adopted a draft resolution submitted by Bangladesh and co-sponsored and supported by 28 other countries.

== See also ==
- Bengal
