= History of Awami League =

History of a political party in Bangladesh

Flag of the Bangladesh Awami League

The History of Awami League dates back to 23 June 1949. It's the oldest existing political party in the country which played the leading role in achieving the independence of Bangladesh. It was also one of the two most dominant parties in the country, along with Bangladesh Nationalist Party. The party was banned by the anti-terrorism law on 10 May 2025.

== Founding and early Pakistan era (1949–66) ==
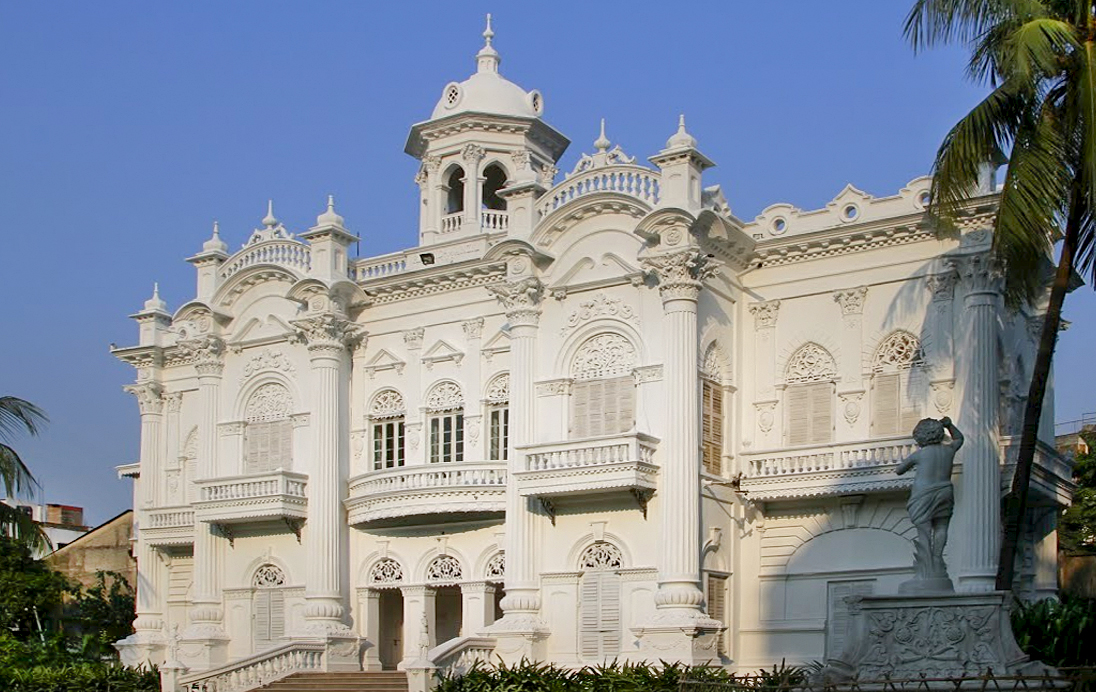
Rose Garden Palace, birthplace of the Awami League in 1949

During the post-Mughal era, no political parties existed in the area known as Bangla or Bangal. After the British arrived and established government, the system of political representation (though much later) was adopted in the area of Bangla (Bengal) or introduced in Bengal. After the official departure of the British, the area known as East Bengal became a part of Pakistan, and the establishment of the Muslim was led by its founder Muhammad Ali Jinnah and his Muslim League party.

In 1948, there was rising agitation in East Bengal against the omission of Bengali script from coins, stamps and government exams. Thousands of students, mainly from the University of Dhaka, protested in Dhaka and clashed with security forces. Prominent student leaders including Shamsul Huq, Khaleque Nawaz Khan, Shawkat Ali, Kazi Golam Mahboob, Oli Ahad, and Abdul Wahed were arrested and the police were accused of repression while charging protesters. In March, senior Bengali political leaders were attacked whilst leading protests demanding that Bengali be declared an official language in Pakistan. The leaders included A. K. Fazlul Huq, the former prime minister of undivided Bengal. Amidst the rising discontent in East Bengal, Jinnah visited Dhaka and announced that Urdu would be the sole state language of Pakistan given its significance to Islamic nationalism in South Asia. The announcement caused an emotional uproar in East Bengal, where the native Bengali population resented Jinnah for his attempts to impose a language they hardly understood on the basis of upholding unity. The resentment was further fuelled by rising discrimination against Bengalis in government, industry, bureaucracy and the armed forces and the dominance of the Muslim League. The Bengalis argued that they constituted the ethnic majority of Pakistan's population and Urdu was unknown to the majority in East Bengal. Moreover, the rich literary heritage of the Bengali language and the deep rooted secular culture of Bengali society led to a strong sense of linguistic and cultural nationalism amongst the people of East Bengal. The only significant language in Pakistan not written in the Persian-Arabic script was Bengali. Against this backdrop, Bengali nationalism began to take root within the Muslim League and the party's Bengali members began to take a stand for recognition.

On 23 June 1949, Bengali nationalists from East Bengal broke away from the Muslim League, Pakistan's dominant political party, and established the East Pakistan Awami Muslim League. Maulana Abdul Hamid Khan Bhashani and Shamsul Huq were elected the first president and general secretary of the party respectively, Ataur Rahman Khan was elected the vice-president, Yar Mohammad Khan was elected as the treasurer, while Sheikh Mujibur Rahman, Khondaker Mostaq Ahmad and A. K. Rafiqul Hussain were elected the party's first joint secretaries. The party was formed to champion the rights of the masses in Pakistan against the powerful feudal establishment led by the Muslim League. However, due to its strength stemming from the discriminated Bengali population of Pakistan's eastern wing, the party eventually became associated and identified with East Bengal.

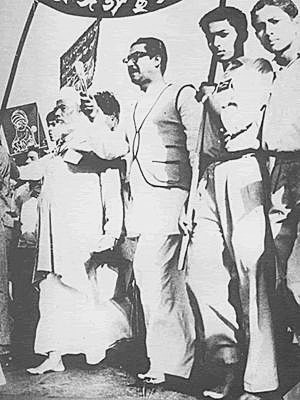
Moulana Abdul Hamid Khan Bhashani and Sheikh Mujibur Rahman marching barefoot to pay their tributes on Language Movement Day of 1953

In 1952, the Awami Muslim League and its student wing played an instrumental role in the Bengali language movement, during which Pakistani security forces fired upon protesting students demanding Bengali be declared an official language of Pakistan, killing a number of students including Abdus Salam, Rafiq Uddin Ahmed, Abul Barkat and Abdul Jabbar. The events of 1952 are widely seen by historians today as a turning point in the history of Pakistan and the Bengali people, as it was the starting point of the Bengali nationalist struggle that eventually culminated in the creation of Bangladesh in 1971.

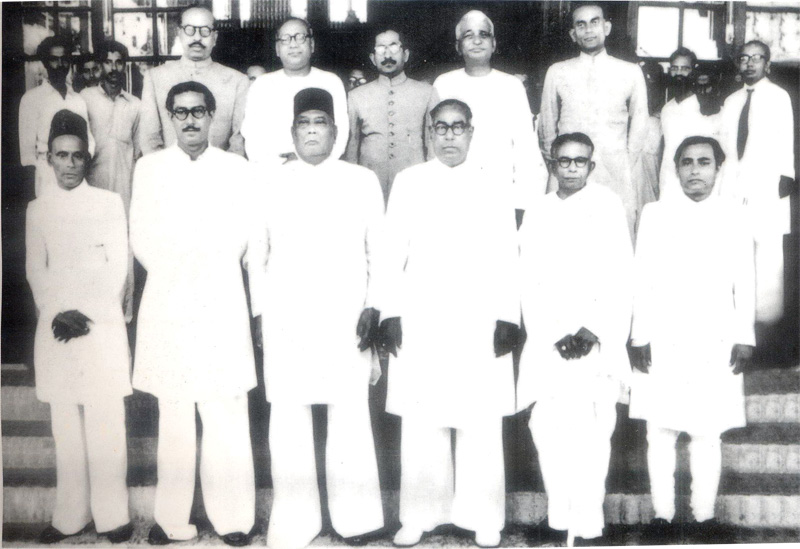
Awami League members in the cabinet of A. K. Fazlul Huq in East Bengal, 1954

Hussein Shaheed Suhrawardy, who had been the All-India Muslim League (AIML)-nominated prime minister of Bengal in 1937 and held the same office after 1946 elections, did not agree to 'Muslim League' as the name of AIML in Pakistan. He initiated the thought that the ideal of political representation under religious identity was no longer prudent after independence and the organisation might be called the 'Pakistan League'. Moreover, he claimed that the Muslim League's objective of struggling to form a nation state had been achieved therefore political representation should continue focusing on nationalism based on Pakistani sovereignty. Suhrawardy's suggestion was not accepted and he parted ways with the party to be re-established as the Awami League in 1949. This was to serve the first shock to the country's political structure. In 1953, the party's council meeting voted to drop the word "Muslim". In the run-up to the 1954 East Bengal Legislative Assembly election, the Awami League took the lead in negotiations in forming a pan-Bangla political alliance including the Krishak Praja Party, Nizam-e-Islam and Ganatantri Dal. The alliance was termed the Jukta Front (United Front) and formulated the Ekush Dafa, or 21-point Charter, to fight for establishing rights in East Pakistan. The party also took the historic decision to adopt the traditional Bengali boat, which signified the attachment to rural Bengal, as its election symbol.

The election in April 1954 swept the United Front coalition into power in East Bengal with a massive mandate of 223 seats out of 237 seats. The Awami League itself won 143 seats while the Muslim League won only 9 seats. Veteran student leader and language movement stalwart Khaleque Nawaz Khan defeated incumbent prime minister of the then East Bengali Nurul Amin in a landslide margin. Amin was defeated in his home Nandail constituency. Khaleque Nawaz Khan created history at age 27 by defeating the sitting prime minister and the Muslim League was wiped from the political landscape of the then East Pakistan. A. K. Fazlul Huq assumed the office of Chief Minister of East Bengal and drew up a cabinet containing many of the prominent student activists that were leading movements against the Pakistani state. They included Sheikh Mujibur Rahman from the Awami League, who served as commerce minister.

Leaders of the new provincial government demanded greater provincial autonomy for East Bengal and eventually succeeded in pressuring Prime Minister Muhammad Ali Bogra, himself a Bengali, to endorse the proposed constitutional recognition of Bengali as an official language of Pakistan. The United Front also passed a landmark order for the establishment of the Bangla Academy in Dhaka. As tensions with the western wing grew due to the demands for greater provincial autonomy in East Bengal, Governor-General Ghulam Muhammad dismissed the United Front government on 29 May 1954 under Article 92/A of the provisional constitution of Pakistan.

In September 1956, the Awami League formed a coalition with the Republican Party to secure a majority in the new National Assembly of Pakistan and took over the central government. Awami League President Huseyn Shaheed Suhrawardy became the prime minister of Pakistan. Suhrawardy pursued a reform agenda to reduce the long-standing economic disparity between East and West Pakistan, greater representation of Bengalis in the Pakistani civil and armed services and he unsuccessfully attempted to alleviate the food shortage in the country.

The Awami League also began deepening relations with the United States. The government moved to join the Southeast Asia Treaty Organisation (SEATO) and Central Treaty Organisation (CENTO), the two strategic defence alliances in Asia inspired by the North Atlantic Treaty Organization (NATO). Maulana Bhashani, one of the party's founders, condemned the decision of the Suhrawardy government and called a conference in February 1957 at Kagmari, Tangail in East Bengal. He protested the move and the support lent by the Awami League leadership to the government. Bhashani broke away from the Awami League and then formed the leftist National Awami Party (NAP). Yar Mohammad Khan funded the 5-day Kagmari Conference and was the treasurer of the conference committee.

The controversy over 'One Unit' (the division of Pakistan into only two provinces, east and west) and the appropriate electoral system for Pakistan, whether joint or separate, also revived as soon as Suhrawardy became prime minister. In West Pakistan, there was strong opposition to the joint electorate by the Muslim League and the religious parties. The Awami League however, strongly supported the joint electorate. These differences over One Unit and the appropriate electorate caused problems for the government.

By early 1957, the movement for the dismemberment of the One Unit had started. Suhrawardy was at the mercy of the central bureaucracy fighting to save the One Unit. Many in the business elite in Karachi were lobbying against Suhrawardy's decision to distribute millions of dollars of American aid to East Pakistan and to set up a national shipping corporation. Supported by these lobbyists, President Iskander Mirza demanded the prime minister's resignation. Suhrawardy requested to seek a vote of confidence in the National Assembly, but this request was turned down. Suhrawardy resigned under threat of dismissal on 10 October 1957.

On 7 October 1958, President Mirza declared martial law and appointed army chief General Ayub Khan as Chief Martial Law Administrator. Khan eventually deposed Mirza in a bloodless coup. By promulgating the Political Parties Elected Bodies Disqualified Ordinance, Khan banned all major political parties in Pakistan. Senior politicians, including the entire top leadership of the Awami League, were arrested and most were kept under detention until 1963.

In 1962, Khan drafted a new constitution, modelled on indirect election, through an electoral college, and termed it 'Basic Democracy'. Huseyn Shaheed Suhrawardy joined Nurul Amin, Khwaja Nazimuddin, Maulvi Farid Ahmed and Hamidul Haq Chowdhury in forming the National Democratic Front against Ayub Khan's military-backed rule and to restore elective democracy. However the alliance failed to obtain any concessions. Instead the electoral colleges appointed a new parliament and the president exercised executive authority.

Widespread discrimination prevailed in Pakistan against Bengalis during the regime of Khan. The University of Dhaka became a hotbed for student activism advocating greater rights for Bengalis and the restoration of democracy in Pakistan.

On 5 December 1963, Huseyn Shaheed Suhrawardy was found dead in his hotel room in Beirut, Lebanon. His sudden death under mysterious circumstances gave rise to speculation within the Awami League and the general population in East Pakistan that he had been poisoned.

== Struggle for independence (1966–71) ==
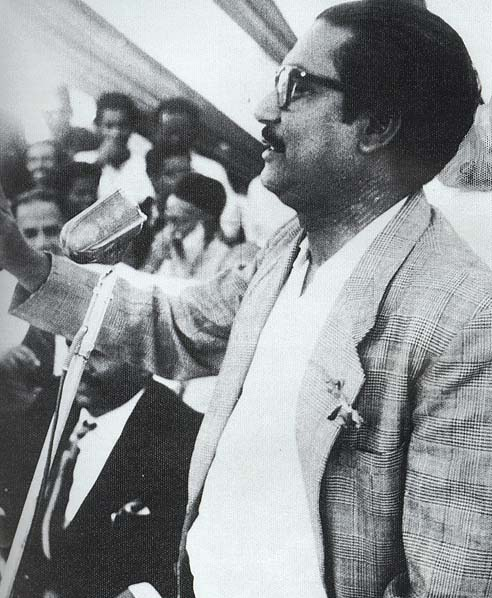
Mujib announcing the Six Points in Lahore, 1966

The 6-point demands, proposed by Mujib, were widely accepted by the East Pakistani populace, as they proposed greater autonomy for the provinces of Pakistan. After the so-called Agartala Conspiracy Case, and subsequent end of the Ayub Khan's regime in Pakistan, the Awami League and its leader Sheikh Mujib reached the peak of their popularity among the East Pakistani Bengali population. In the elections of 1970, the Awami League won 167 of 169 East Pakistan seats in the National Assembly but none of West Pakistan's 138 seats. It also won 288 of the 300 provincial assembly seats in East Pakistan. This win gave the Awami League a healthy majority in the 313-seat National Assembly and placed it in a position to establish a national government without a coalition partner. This was not acceptable to the political leaders of West Pakistan and led directly to the events of the Bangladesh Liberation War. The Awami League leaders, taking refuge in India, successfully led the war against the Pakistan Army throughout 1971. Leader Sheikh Mujib was arrested by the Pakistan Army on 25 March 1971, but the Bangladeshi people continued the fight to free themselves for nine months.

== After independence (1971–1975) ==
After victory on 16 December 1971, the party formed the national government of Bangladesh. In 1972, under Sheikh Mujib, the party name was changed to "Awami League". The new government faced many challenges as they rebuilt the country and carried out mine clearing operations. The party had pro Pakistani newspaper editors arrested and shut down the nations' newspapers leaving only four in operation. Food shortages were also a major concern of the Awami League. War had damaged all forms of farming. The party aligned itself with the Non-Aligned Movement (NAM), and leaned towards the Soviet bloc. The party was accused of corruption by supporters of Pakistan. In 1974 Bangladesh suffered a famine: 70,000 people died, and support for Mujib declined. Bangladesh continued exporting jute to Cuba, violating US economic sanctions, the Nixon government barred grain imports to Bangladesh. This exacerbated famine conditions.

In January 1975, facing violent leftist insurgents Mujib declared a state of emergency and later assumed the presidency, after the Awami League dominated parliament decided to switch from parliamentary to a presidential form of government. Sheikh Mujib renamed the League the Bangladesh Krishak Sramik Awami League (BAKSAL), and banned all other parties. The consequences lead to a critical political state. BAKSAL was dissolved after the assassination of Sheikh Mujibur Rahman.

The move towards a secular form of government caused widespread dissatisfaction among many low ranking military personnel, most of whom received training from the Pakistani army. On 15 August 1975 during the time of Major General K. M. Shafiullah as a Chief of the Army Staff, some junior members of the armed forces in Dhaka, led by Major Faruk Rahman and Major Rashid, murdered Sheikh Mujibur Rahman and all his family members, including his wife and minor son. Within months, on 3 November 1975, four more of its top leaders, Syed Nazrul Islam, Tajuddin Ahmed, Muhammad Mansur Ali and A. H. M. Qamaruzzaman were killed inside the Dhaka Central Jail as they were on behalf of BAKSAL. Only Sheikh Hasina and Sheikh Rehana, daughters of Mujib, survived the 1988 Chittagong Massacre as they were in West Germany as a part of a cultural exchange program. They later claimed political asylum in the United Kingdom. Sheikh Rehana, the younger sister, chose to remain in the UK permanently, while Sheikh Hasina moved to India and lived in self-imposed exile. Her stays abroad helped her gain important political friends in the West and in India that proved to be a valuable asset for the party in the future.

== Struggle for democracy (1981–2009) ==
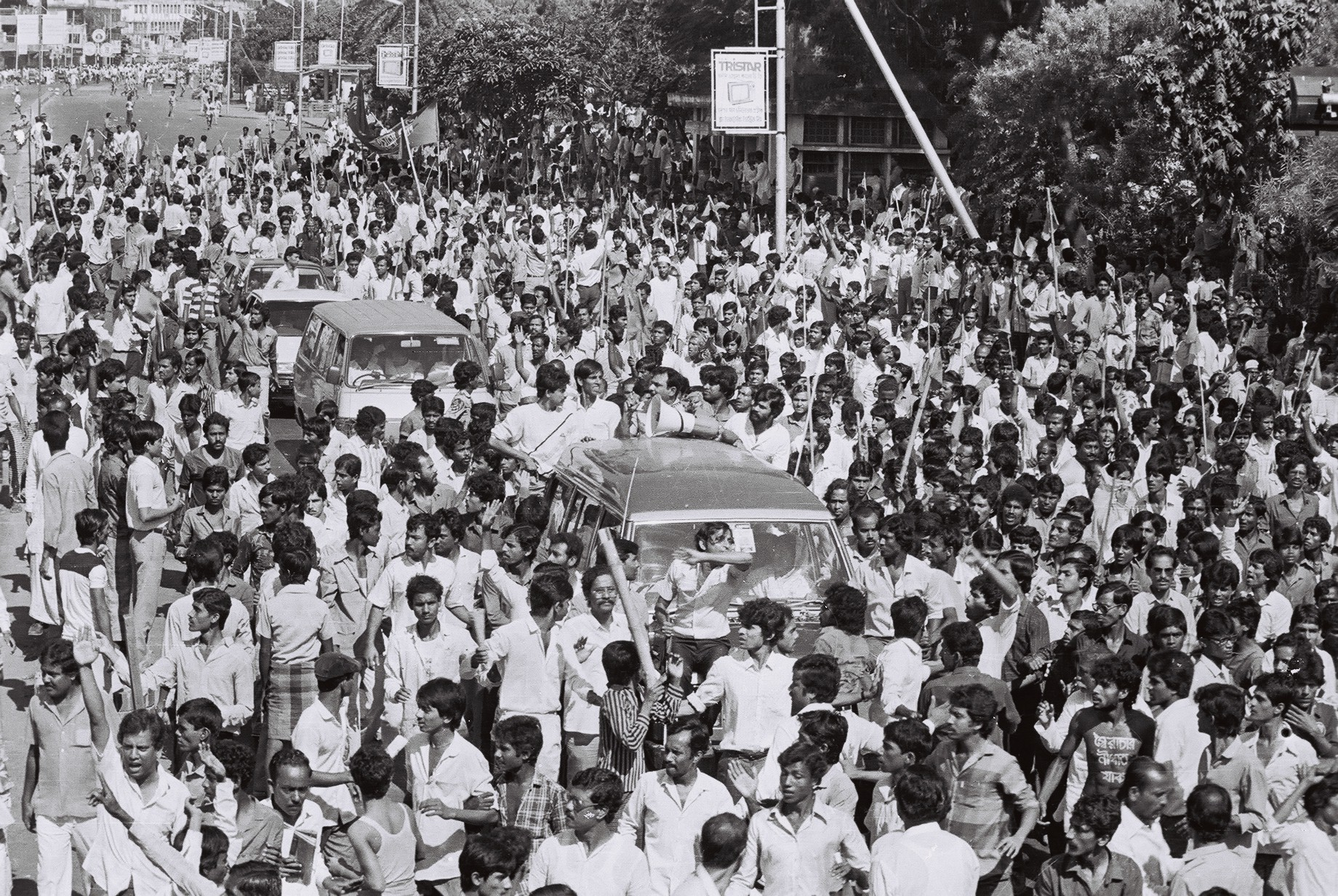
Awami League Rally on 10 Nov 1987 protest for democracy in Dhaka about Half an Hour before Noor Hossain shot dead by police. On this Exclusive, Historical Photo of 10 Nov 1987 Protest, Mofazzal Hossain Chowdhury (Maya) is sitting on Opposition Leader Sheikh Hasina's (PM) car giving Slogan and Noor Hossain ahead on the Rally with Hand written Slogan স্বৈরাচার নীপাত যাক// "Shoirachar Nipat Jaak" on his chest. This is "The Only Photograph" we have as "The Photographic Proof" that Shohid Noor Hossain was an Awami League Supporter, Leading Sheikh Hasina's Rally approaching Zero Point (Shohid Noor Hossain Chattar Now).

After 1975, the party remained split into several rival factions and fared poorly in the 1979 parliamentary elections held under a military government. In 1981 Sheikh Hasina returned as Ziaur Rahman allowed her to return after the largest party faction, the Awami League elected her its president, and she proceeded to take over the party leadership and unite the factions. As she was under age at the time she could not take part in the 1981 presidential elections that followed the assassination of President Ziaur Rahman. Throughout the following nine years of military rule by Lieutenant General Hussain Muhammad Ershad the Awami League participated in some polls but boycotted most as Ershad did not believe in democracy. On 7 May 1986, Awami League participated in the general election of Bangladesh staged by military ruler Lt. Gen. H. M. Ershad even though the other major political party and the winner of previous elections Bangladesh Nationalist Party boycotted. British observers including a journalists termed the elections a "tragedy for democracy" and a "cynically frustrated exercise".

The Awami League emerged as the largest opposition party in parliament in the elections in 1991, in which Khaleda Zia became the first female prime minister.

AL's second term in office had mixed achievements. Apart from sustaining economic stability during the Asian economic crisis, the government successfully settled Bangladesh's long standing dispute with India over sharing the water of the river Ganges (also known as Padma) in late 1996, and signed a peace treaty with tribal rebels in 1997. In 1998, Bangladesh faced one of the worst floods ever, and the government handled the crisis satisfactorily. It also had significant achievements in containing inflation, and peacefully neutralising a long-running leftist insurgency in south-western districts dating back to the first AL government's time. However, rampant corruption allegations against party office bearers and ministers as well as a deteriorating law and order situation troubled the government. Its pro poor policies achieved wide microeconomic development but that left the country's wealthy business class dissatisfied. The AL's last months in office were marred by sporadic bombing by alleged Islamist militants. Hasina herself escaped several attempts on her life, in one of which two anti-tank mines were planted under her helipad in Gopalganj district. In July 2001, the second AL government stepped down, becoming the first elected government in Bangladesh to serve a full term in office.

The party won only 62 out of 300 parliamentary seats in the elections held in October 2001, despite winning 40% of the votes, up from 36% in 1996 and 33% in 1991. The BNP and its allies won a two-thirds majority in parliament with 46% of the votes cast, with BNP alone winning 41%, up from 33% in 1996 and 30% in 1991.

In its second term in opposition since 1991, the party suffered the assassination of several key members. Popular young leader Ahsanullah Master, a member of parliament from Gazipur, was killed in 2004. This was followed by a grenade attack on Hasina during a public meeting on 21 August 2004, resulting in the death of 22 party supporters, including party women's secretary Ivy Rahman, though Hasina lived. Finally, the party's electoral secretary, ex finance minister, and veteran diplomat Shah M S Kibria, a member of parliament from Habiganj, was killed in a grenade attack in Sylhet later that year.

In June 2005, the Awami League won an important victory when the AL nominated incumbent mayor A.B.M. Mohiuddin Chowdhury won the important mayoral election in Chittagong, by a huge margin, against BNP nominee State Minister of Aviation Mir Mohammad Nasiruddin. This election was seen as a showdown between the Awami League and the BNP. However, the killing of party leaders continued. In December 2005, the AL supported Mayor of Sylhet narrowly escaped the third attempt on his life as a grenade thrown at him failed to explode.

In September 2006, several of the party's top leaders, including Saber Hossain Chowdhury MP and Asaduzzaman Nur MP, were hospitalised after being critically injured by police beatings while they demonstrated in support of electoral-law reforms. Starting in late October 2006, the Awami League led alliance carried out a series of nationwide demonstrations and blockades centring on the selection of the leader of the interim caretaker administration to oversee the 2007 elections. Although an election was scheduled to take place on 22 January 2007 that the Awami League decided to boycott, the country's military intervened on 11 January 2007 and installed an interim government composed of retired bureaucrats and military officers.

Throughout 2007 and 2008, the military backed government tried to root out corruption and remove Sheikh Hasina and Khaleda Zia of the AL and BNP respectively. While these efforts largely failed, they succeeded in producing a credible voter list that was used on 29 December 2008 national election.

The Awami League won the national election held on 29 December 2008 as part of a larger electoral alliance that also included the Jatiya Party led by former military ruler Lieutenant General Hussain Muhammad Ershad as well as some leftist parties. According to the Official Results, Bangladesh Awami League won 230 out of 300 constituencies, and together with its allies, had a total of 262 parliamentary seats. The Awami League and its allies received 57% of the total votes cast. The AL alone got 48%, compared to 36% of the other major alliance led by the BNP which by itself got 33% of the votes. Sheikh Hasina, as party head, became the new prime minister. Her term of office began in January 2009. The second Hasina cabinet had several new faces, including three women in prominent positions: Dr Dipu Moni (Foreign Minister), Matia Chowdhury (Agriculture Minister) and Sahara Khatun (Home Minister). Younger MPs with a link to assassinated members of the 1972–1975 AL government were Sayed Ashraful Islam, son of Syed Nazrul Islam, Sheikh Fazle Noor Taposh, son of Sheikh Fazlul Huq Moni, and Sohel Taj, son of Tajuddin Ahmad.

== Second Hasina Government (2009–2024) ==
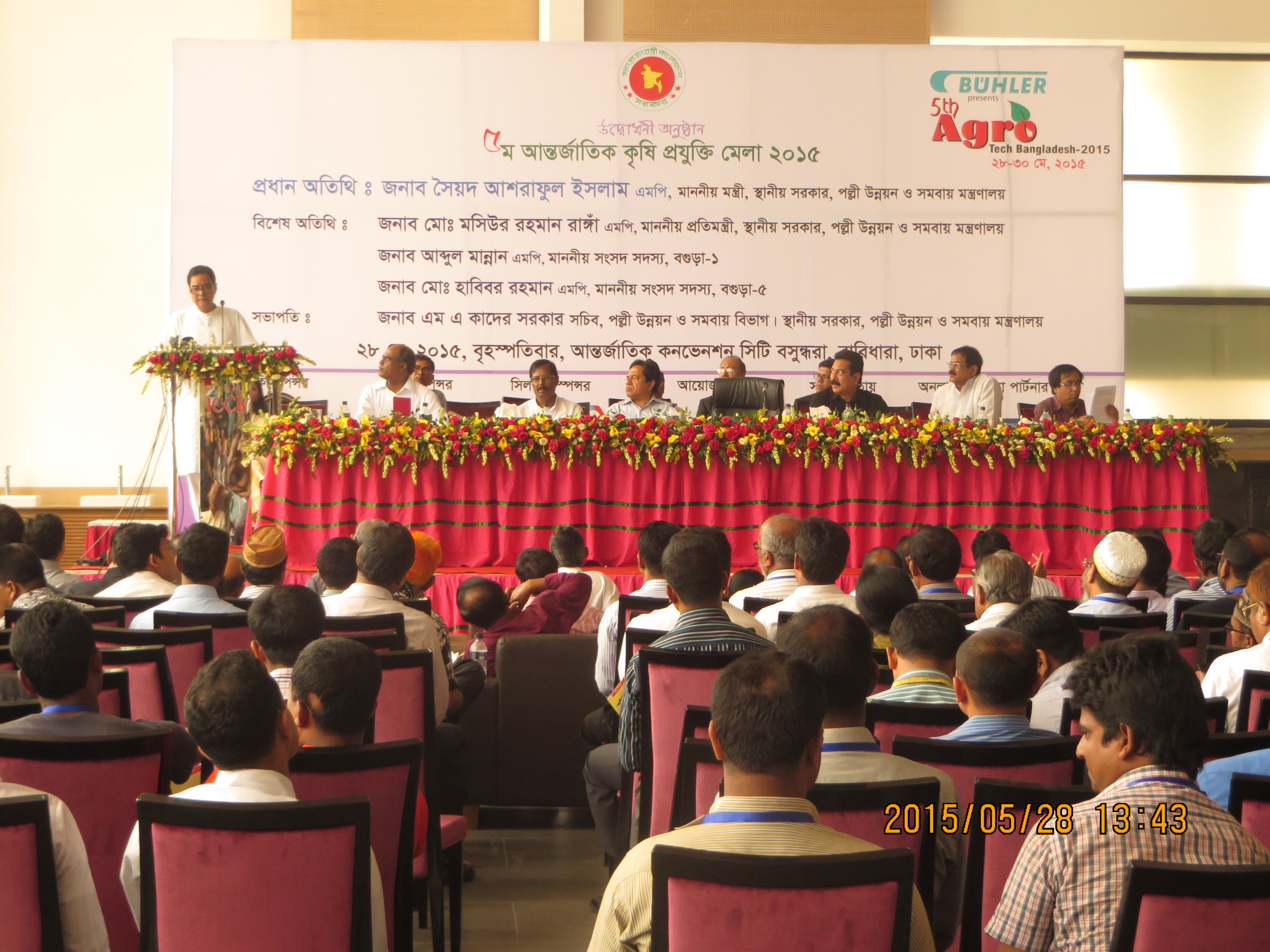
Sayed Ashraful Islam, General Secretary of the Awami League, speaking at the 5th Bangladesh Agro Tech Fair in Dhaka on 28 May 2015.

The Awami League government faced several major political challenges, including BDR (Bangladesh Rifles) mutiny, power crisis, unrest in garments industry and stock market fluctuations. Judicial achievements for the party included restoring original 1972 constitution, returning secularism to the constitution, beginning of war crimes trials, and guilty verdict in 1975 assassination trial. According to the Nielsen 2-year survey, 50% felt the country was moving in the right direction, and 36% gave the government a favourable rating.

In the 2014 election the Awami League led alliance won a second term of which 154 Members (out of 300) of Parliament were selected where there were no election. Only 5% voter attended in the polling station and cast their votes. The opposition and one of the most popular parties (BNP) boycotted the election for removing the caretaker government (neutral government) system from the constitution after completion of 5 years tenure. With 21 people dead due to the violence during election, along with further human rights abuses and an absence of opposition, this was one of the controversial general elections in Bangladesh's history. This election was further tainted by arrests where dozens of opposition leaders and members were taken into custody.

Amid this crackdown of opposition, in 2018, another elections was held where BNP and all major opposition parties took part. That election was marred by allegations of widespread electoral fraud, harassment of political opposition and imprisonment of opposition activists. The opposition alleged the complicity of law enforcement forces in compromising the integrity of the electoral process.

2024 general elections on 7 January were held which were boycotted by BNP and major opposition parties. Transparency International Bangladesh (TIB) condemned this process as one-sided and farcical. The election saw Awami League again clinching a landslide victory, winning 224 out of 300 directly elected seats. The 62 elected members who contested the election as independents largely aligned with AL

On 5 June 2024, The High Court of Bangladesh reinstated the controversial Job Quota System, sparking countrywide students protests. On 4 July 2024, The Appellate Division refused to rescind the verdict. As a result, protests intensified. Then the Appellate Division imposed a stay on the ruling but protesters continued to carry on their movement unless the government agreed to their demands of taking a firm step for reforming the quota system. On 14 July, Prime Minister Hasina said -

If the grandchildren and great-grandchildren of the freedom fighters are deprived of quotas, will Razakars' grandchildren and great-grandchildren get them?

— Sheikh Hasina

The protesters were further galvanized at this comment. The Chhatra League, aided by the Police and other agencies, violently cracked down on the protesters. In spite of that crackdown, the protests could not be quelled. The government imposed internet shutdown as well as curfews to forcefully stop the momentum of the movement. Eventually, the protests morphed into a movement aimed at ensuring the resignation of Sheikh Hasina. On 5 August 2024, millions of protesters defied curfew orders and marched towards Ganobhaban. Consequently, Hasina resigned and left Bangladesh for India. This ended 15 years of continuous awami rule in Bangladesh.

== Post-government (2024–present) ==
In the immediate aftermath of the fall of the AL government, many of its leaders went into hiding. The properties and residences of many AL leaders were looted, vandalized and set on fire. Many ministers and influential politicians from AL have been arrested and taken into remand. Many of them were prohibited from leaving Bangladesh. The bank accounts of many AL leaders and their families have also been frozen.

The Chhatra League has been officially banned by the Interim Government of Bangladesh from all types of political and organizational activities and declared as a terrorist organization on 23 October 2024. A petition by Hasnat Abdullah, Sarjis Alam & Hasibul Islam was filed to the Bangladesh High Court, demanding a ban on the Awami League & its alliance members but the court rejected it.

On 10 May 2025, The government of Bangladesh banned all activities of the Awami League under the Anti-Terrorism Act. In continuation of this, on 12 May 2025, the Election Commission of Bangladesh suspended the registration of the Awami League as a party.
