= Shawkat Ali =

Bengali politician

- শওকত আলী
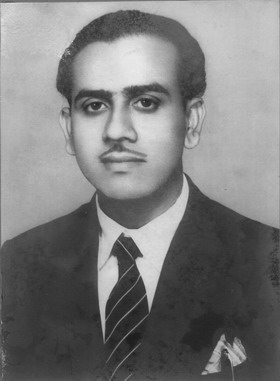
- Ali in 1970
- Born: April 20, 1918; Gandaria, Dhaka, Bengal Presidency, British India
- Died: August 18, 1975 (aged 57); Dhaka, Bangladesh
- Citizenship: Bangladesh
- Occupation: Politician
- Political party: Bangladesh Awami League
- Spouse: Rahima Khatun
- Awards: Ekushe Padak

Shawkat Ali (April 20, 1918 – August 18, 1975) was a politician and a leader of the Bengali language movement. He was one of the founders of Awami Muslim League - which later became the Awami League and is now the Bangladesh Awami League. He was a member of all three Rastrabhasa Sangram Parishad. He was also the Chief Organizer of the Dhaka City Awami League during the 1950s. His house in 150, Chawk Moghultuly, Dhaka was the center for many activities and meetings during the Language Movement. He died of a stroke on August 18, 1975. He is buried in Jurain graveyard in Dhaka.

== Early life ==
Shawkat Ali was born in a prominent Sunni Muslim family in Gandaria, Dhaka, East Bengal, on April 20, 1918. His father Shamser Ali was a prominent businessman in the area and his mother Meherunnisa Khanam was a housewife. He lost his mother when he was two years old. He was raised by his father and maternal uncles and aunts. He attended Muslim High School. After completing high school, he attended Jagannath College and received his B.Com. degree. He went for higher studies in Dhaka University but could not finish due to political involvement.

== Political career ==
Shawkat Ali was deeply involved with Tamaddun Majlish. On 30 December 1947, a meeting was called by Principal Abul Kashem at the Rashid Building. The first Rastrabhasa Sangram Parishad called "Tomuddin Majlish er Rashtrobhasha sub-committee" was formed under the leadership of Professor Abul Kashem. Shawkat Ali was elected as one of the members of that committee.

On March 2, 1948, he was elected one of the members of the second Language Movement sub-committee. The second sub-committee called a general strike throughout the country on 11 March 1948. It was the first strike of the Language Movement. Shawkat Ali played an important role during that strike. He along with his friends started picketing in front of the second entrance of the Secretariat building. At one point of the picketing, he halted the car carrying the Police S.P. Chatham and I.G. Zakir Hossain. Others picketing with him were Kazi Golam Mahbub and Engineer Barkat. When the I.G. handcuffed the other two activists, Shawkat Ali laid down in front of the car. The I.G. then said "you are under arrest too" and grabbed his hand. Shawkat Ali in return grabbed the shiny car bumper with his other hand. The car then started to move while dragging him along with the I.G. He was then arrested and taken away. Also arrested on that day were Sheikh Mujibur Rahman, Khaleque Nawaz Khan, Shamsul Huq, Oli Ahad, Abdul Wahed and others. Separate cases were filed against Shawkat Ali and Kazi Golam Mahbub. All the arrestees were released on the evening of 15 March after signing the Rashtrobhasha Chukti (Language Movement Treaty). The authorities refused to free Shawkat Ali and Kazi Golam Mahbub because they had separate charges against them along with the charges for picketing. At this point, the other released leaders and activists started shouting at the jail authorities and declared that they would not leave prison until all the leaders are freed. The authorities finally had to release the other leaders.

On March 16, 1948, a student meeting was held at the Dhaka University Campus demanding Bengali to be the National Language. After the meeting, Sheikh Mujibur Rahman led a rally towards the Assembly Hall. The rally passed Engineering College, Dhaka Medical College and reached the four corners near Assembly Hall. The students surrounded the Hall and laid a siege. The members of the assembly, the speaker, deputy speaker, and the MPs were all encircled. Shawkat Ali, Sheikh Mujibur Rahman, and others engaged in a heated exchange of words with the MPs and the District Magistrate. Suddenly, the students came under attack by the police. The policemen started using batons, tear gas shells and fired blanks. Nineteen activists were injured that day and Shawkat Ali was the most seriously hurt.

The Language Movement reached its climax in 1952 with the indiscriminate shooting by the police at protesters and killing four young men - Abdus Salam, Rafiq Uddin Ahmed, Abul Barkat and Abdul Jabbar.

Shawkat Ali led and organised many of the protests, rallies, and picketing during the tragic and fateful days of February 1952. He was arrested again on March 2, 1952, and was imprisoned for a long time.

== Death ==
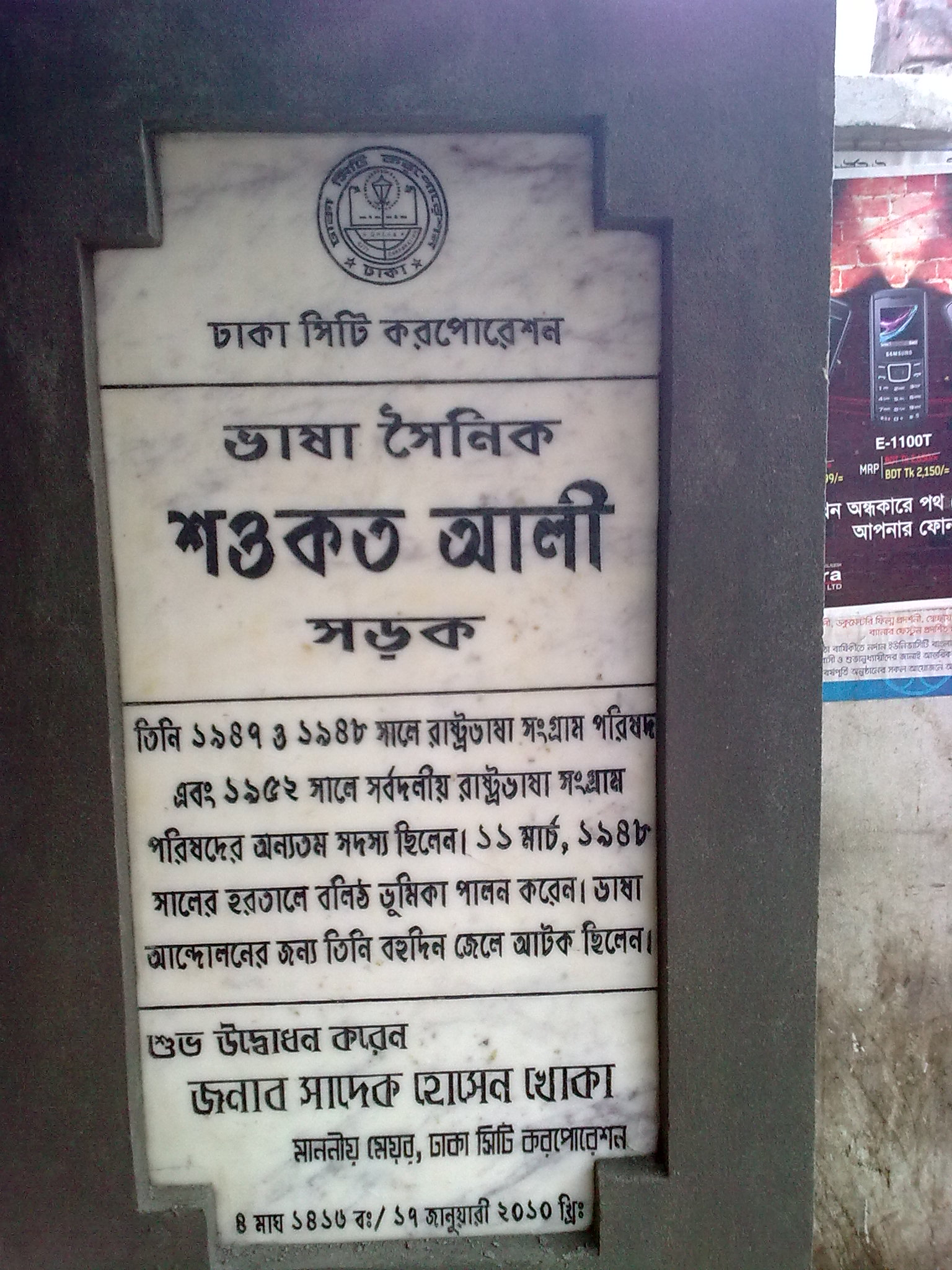
Dhaka City Corporation renamed Dhanmondi Road No. 4/A after Shawkat Ali in 2010

Shawkat Ali suffered a stroke on August 15, 1975, upon hearing the news of the Assassination of Sheikh Mujibur Rahman. He died on August 18, 1975, at the Holy Family Hospital, Dhaka. He is buried in Jurain graveyard in Dhaka.

== Family ==
On 1960, Ali married Rahima Khatun, the vice-principal of Fazlul Haq Mohila College in Dhaka. They had three sons and a daughter.

== Legacy ==
In 2011, Ali was awarded the Ekushey Padak one of the highest civilian awards in Bangladesh.

In recognition of his outstanding contribution to the Language Movement, with effect from January 17, 2010, Dhaka City Corporation renamed Dhanmondi Road No. 4/A after him.
