= Abdul Gafur (language activist) =

Bangladeshi language activis (1929–2024)

- আবদুল গফুর
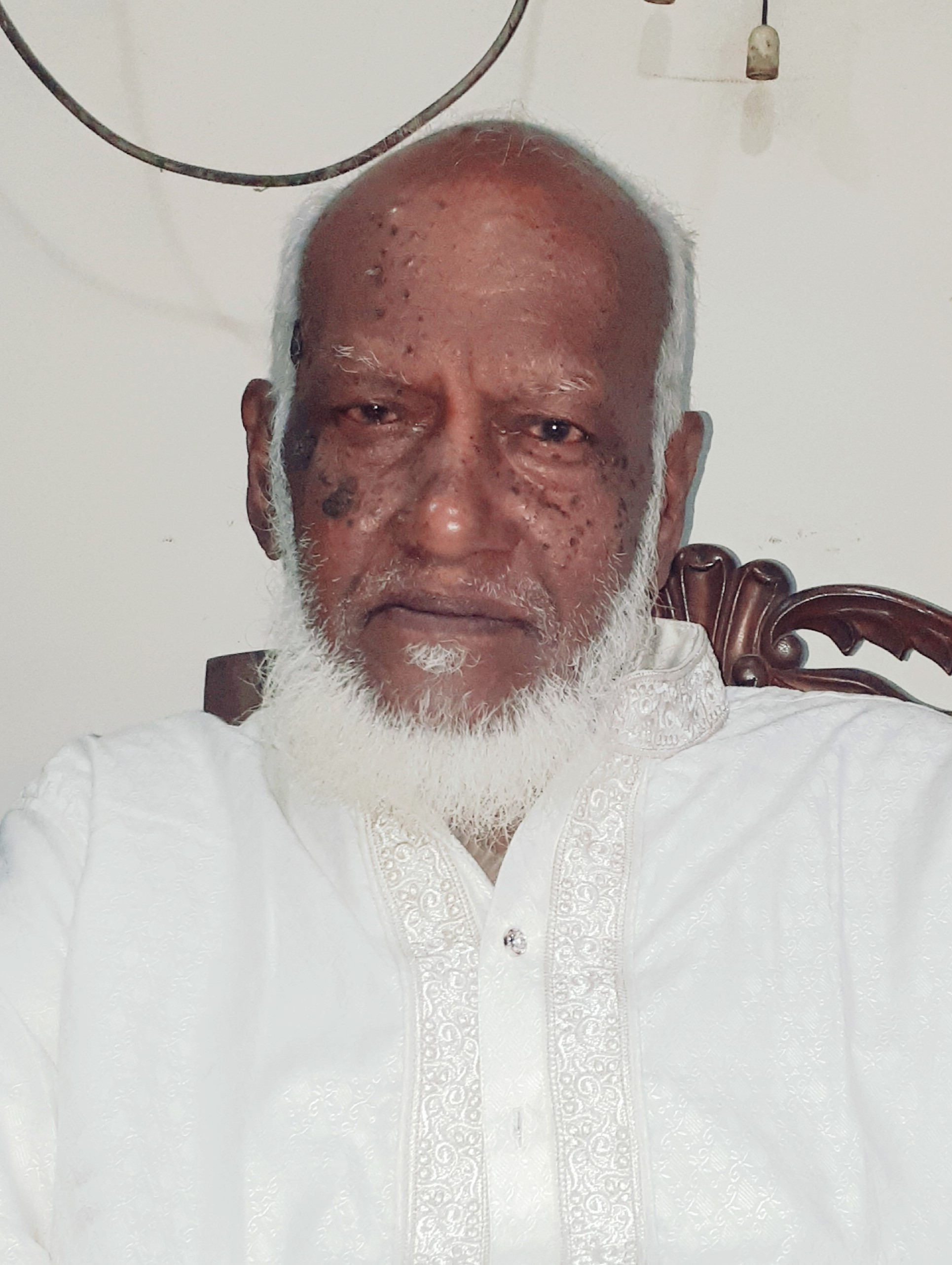
- Abdul Gafur in 2019
- Born: 19 February 1929; Pangsha, Bengal Presidency, British India (present-day Rajbari District, Bangladesh)
- Died: 27 September 2024 (aged 95); Dhaka, Bangladesh
- Occupations: Journalist, teacher, writer
- Known for: Bengali language activist
- Parents: Habil Uddin Munshi (father); Shukurunnesa Khatun (mother)
- Awards: Ekushey Padak (2005)

Mohammad Abdul Gafur (19 February 1929 – 27 September 2024) was a Bangladeshi journalist, teacher, writer and language activist of the Bengali language movement that took place in the erstwhile East Pakistan (currently Bangladesh) to make Bengali one of the state languages of Pakistan. He was one of the noted members of Tamaddun Majlish, an Islamic cultural organization which played a vital role at the start of the movement.

In recognition of his contributions to the language movement, he was awarded Ekushey Padak by the Government of Bangladesh in 2005.

== Life and career ==
Abdul Gafur was born on 19 February 1929 in Pangsha thana of Greater Faridpur District (now Rajbari District of Bangladesh) during the time of British Raj to Haji Habil Uddin Munshi and Shukurunnesa Khatun. He completed his secondary education in 1945 from the local Maizuddin High Madrasa and higher secondary from Kabi Nazrul Government College in 1947. Later he was admitted to the Bengali language and literature department of Dhaka University. Including him, there were only three students in his department. The other two were Nurul Islam Patwari and Momtaz Begum.

When the Language Movement started, he took part in the movement as an enthusiastic activist and this slowed down his educational life. Later, he obtained his post-graduate degree from the Social Welfare Department of the same university in 1962.

Abdul Gafur died on 27 September 2024, at the age of 95.He was a life member of Bangla Academy. He played role in organizing Nazrul Academy and also translating different books through Islamic Foundation. In his time ( of working as Research Publication Director 1979 - 1986) Islamic Foundation published many books both original and translated.

[5]
