= Pakistaner Rashtra Bhasha: Bangla Na Urdu? =

Small book published on 15 September 1947

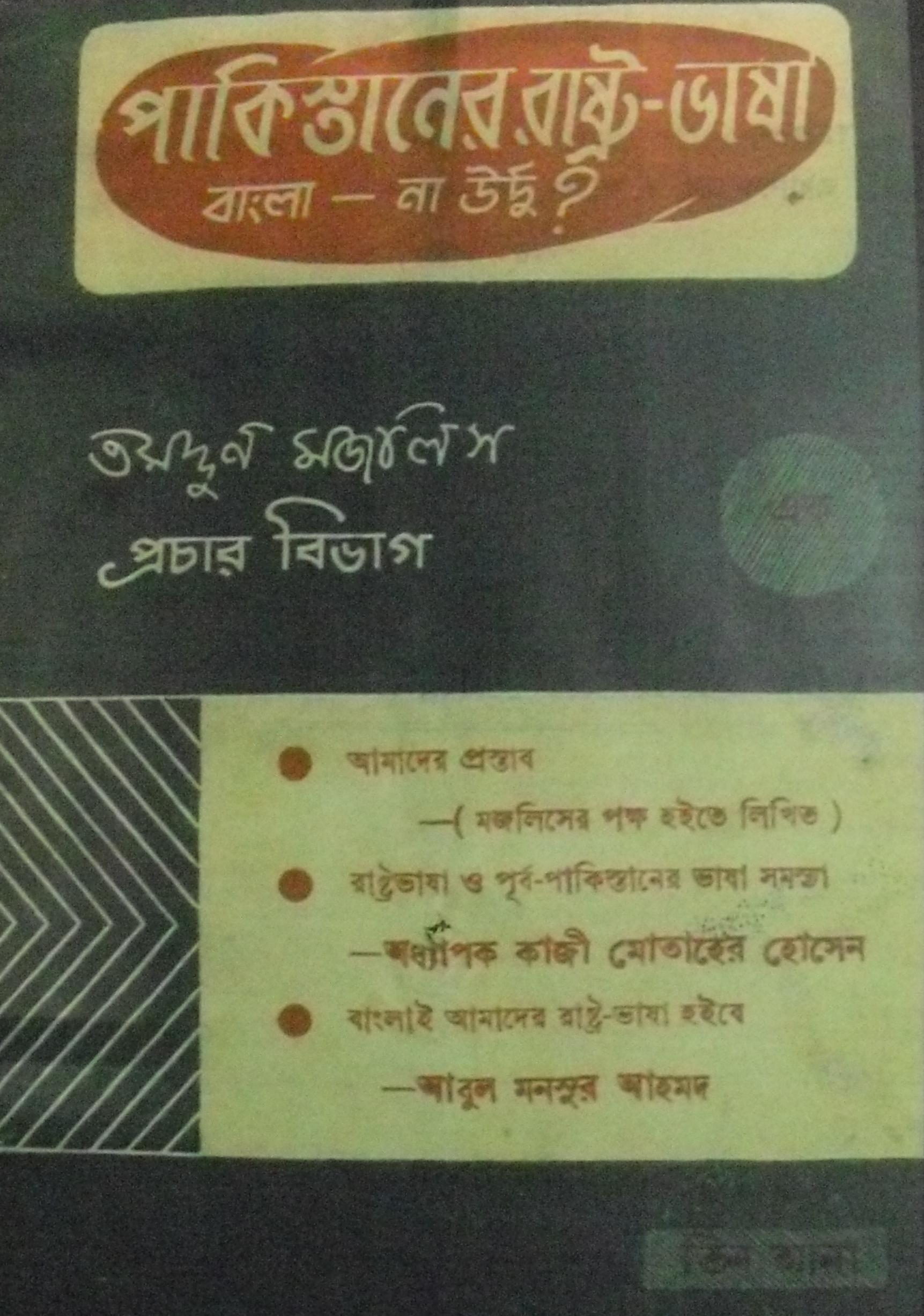
- Cover page of Pakistaner Rashtra Bhasha: Bangla Na Urdu?
- Author: Principal Abul Kashem
- Original title: পাকিস্তানের রাষ্ট্রভাষা: বাংলা না উর্দু?
- Language: Bengali
- Subject: Language Movement, Bengali Language Advocacy
- Genre: Non-fiction
- Publisher: Tamaddun Majlish
- Publication date: 15 September 1947
- Publication place: Pakistan

Pakistaner Rashtra Bhasha: Bangla Na Urdu? (Bengali: পাকিস্তানের রাষ্ট্রভাষা: বাংলা না উর্দু?, lit. 'Pakistan's national language: Bengali or Urdu?') is a small book published on 15 September 1947 by Bengali language movement pioneer Principal Abul Kashem on behalf of Tamaddun Majlish. Within one month of Pakistan's Independent by publishing this book, it demanded introduction of Bengali as one of the state language of whole Pakistan. This book also strongly advocated for Bengali as the medium of education, court language and for its use in the offices in East Pakistan.

== About the booklet ==
Tamaddun Majlish was founded by Prof Abul Kashem, a teacher, Dept. of Physics, Dhaka University, along with some other teachers and students of Dhaka University on 2 September 1947. This organization published a booklet entitled 'Pakistaner Rashtra Bhasha: Bangla Na Urdu?' (State Language of Pakistan-Bengali or Urdu?) on 15 September 1947. The booklet contained three articles contributed by Prof Qazi Motahar Hossain, an eminent litterateur and Professor of Dhaka University, Abul Mansur Ahmed, politician, litterateur and Editor, Daily Ittehad, Calcutta, and Prof Abul Kashem, the founder of Tamaddun Majlish. Prof Qazi Motahar Hossain in his article entitled 'Rastra Bhasha O Purba Pakistaner Bhasha Samasya' (State language and the language problem of East Pakistan), while trying to remove apathy towards Bengali from the minds of some people, pointed out that it was the Muslim rulers who gave liberal patronage to develop Bengali language and asserted that Bengali was very much a language of the Muslims too. Abul Mansur Ahmed in his article entitled 'Bangla Bhashai Hoibe Amader Rastra Bhasha' (Bengali must be made our state language) dealt mainly on the economic importance of the Language Movement. He cautioned that if Urdu was made the only state language of Pakistan, the educated people of East Pakistan would turn 'uneducated" overnight. In the opening article of the bookl entitled 'Amader Prastab' (our proposal), Prof. Abul Kashem put forward the basic demands of the Language Movement in most concrete terms.

In his article, he asserted that-

1. Bengali will be:
  1. the medium of instruction in East Pakistan;
  2. the court language of East Pakistan; and
  3. the official language of East Pakistan.
2. Urdu and Bengali will be the two official languages of the Central Government of Pakistan.
3. Bengali will be the first language for the purpose of education in East Pakistan which will be learnt by 100 percent of people;
  1. Urdu may be treated as the second language or inter-wing language in East Pakistan which can be taught as a second language to those people who will be working in West Pakistan. It will be more than adequate if Urdu is learn by only 5% to 10% of population of East Pakistan. Urdu may be taught in higher classes at the secondary school level in East Pakistan; and
  2. English will be the third or international language of East Pakistan.
4. Both English and Bengali will be used for a few years as the official languages in East Pakistan."

He further urged upon all people to hold meetings in various parts of the country and in different educational institutions protesting against the move to impose any language other than the mother language and send resolutions passed in these meetings to Governor General Quaide Azam and other leaders. He appealed to people of various areas of the country to send delegations to different members of the Constituent Assembly urging them to support the cause of Bengali. He also called upon all people to join the Movement and make it strong and invincible.

The booklet not only provided the people with the rationale for the Language Movement, but also showed the way they had to proceed to create a vigorous movement to make Bengali the state language.
