= Abul Kashem =

Bangladeshi activists, author

Mohammad Abul Kashem
- মোহাম্মদ আবুল কাশেম
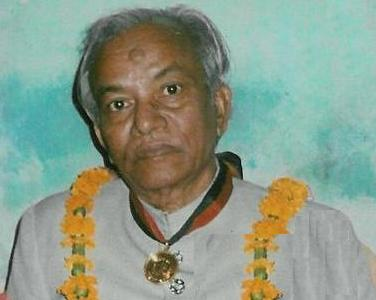
- Abul Kashem receiving Ekushey Padak (1987)
- Born: 28 June 1920; Chittagong District, Bengal, British India
- Died: 11 March 1991 (aged 70); Dhaka, Bangladesh
- Spouses: Rahela Kashem; Momtaz Kashem

Mohammad Abul Kashem (known as Principal Abul Kashem, 28 June 1920 – 11 March 1991) is generally considered as a pioneer and the architect of the historic Language Movement of Bangladesh. He was also a politician, author and an eminent educationist. He founded the Islamic-oriented Bengali cultural organisation Tamaddun Majlish.

== Early life ==
Abul Kashem was born on 28 June 1920 at a village Cheebandy-Barama under Chandanaish Upazila of district of Chittagong. In 1939, Abul Kashem obtained his Matriculation Examination from Boroma Trahi Menka High School with first class and Government district scholarship. He passed Isc from Chittagong government College in 1941 with first class. From Dhaka University, he obtained a Bachelor of Science (honors) in Physics in 1944 and a Master of Science degree in physics in 1945. He completed his master's thesis under the supervision of the famous mathematician and physicist Satyendra Nath Bose.

== Involvement in Language Movement ==
Abul Kashem was associated with the literary and cultural activities of Bangladesh for five decades. He contributed in the movement for recognition of Bengali as one of the state languages of Pakistan soon after the independence of Pakistan in 1947. On 1 September 1947 he founded the Pakistan Tamaddun Majlish as a non-political cultural organisation to mobilise students, intellectuals and the people in general for the Bengali language. On 15 September 1947 he published a booklet entitled, Pakistaner Rashtra Bhasha: Bangla Na Urdu? (Pakistan's state language: Bengali or Urdu?) demanding introduction of Bengali as one of the state language of whole Pakistan. This booklet also strongly advocated for Bengali as the medium of education, court language and for its use in the offices in East Pakistan. Also his untiring efforts let to the formation of the first Rashtrabhasa Sangram Parishad (State Language Committee of Action) on 1 October 1947 with Nurul Huq Bhuiyan as the convener and he himself as the treasurer. On 6 December 1947, a meeting was held under the president-ship of Abul Kashem in Dhaka University campus which protested the resolution of the education week held in Karachi suggesting Urdu as the state language and the lingua franca of Pakistan. A protest procession was brought out from the meeting, which met Khawaja Nazimuddin, the provincial Chief Minister, and other ministers. Khawaja Nazimuddin gave a written assurance to the Action Committee that he would do the needful to introduce Bengali as one of the state language of Pakistan. Abul Kashem actively participated in organising a countrywide strike on 11 March 1948, to press for the language demand. As the outcome of the strike, on the eve of the impending visit of Mohammad Ali Jinnah (the founder of Pakistan) to Dhaka, the then Provincial Government had no other alternative but to sign an agreement with the action committee on 15 March 1948 for introducing Bengali as one of the state language of Pakistan.

== Career ==
Abul Kashem began his career as a lecturer in the Physics department at Dhaka University in 1946. As a lecturer, he was the first person who delivered lectures in the Bengali at Dhaka University. He held his lecturer position until 1953.

Abul Kashem was actively associated with politics. He was a co-founder of the Khilafat-e-Rabbani Party in 1952. He was a member of the provincial assembly as a United Front nominee in 1954 from the Patia-Boalkhali constituency in Chittagong. While a member of the Legislative Assembly, he moved a resolution for introduction of Bengali as the medium of education at all levels. On 30 September 1956, he proposed Bengali as the state-language and it was approved unanimously and thus, Bengali received constitutional recognition as one of the State language of Pakistan. He founded the weekly Sainik in 1948, which acted as a mouthpiece of the historic Language Movement.

He felt the need of introducing Bengali as medium of higher education in colleges and universities. With his dream, he established the Bangla College at Mirpur, Dhaka in 1962 and served the college as Principal until 1981. He was the forerunner in introducing textbooks in Bengali for higher education and contributed much in initiating the Bengali version of the question papers for higher education.

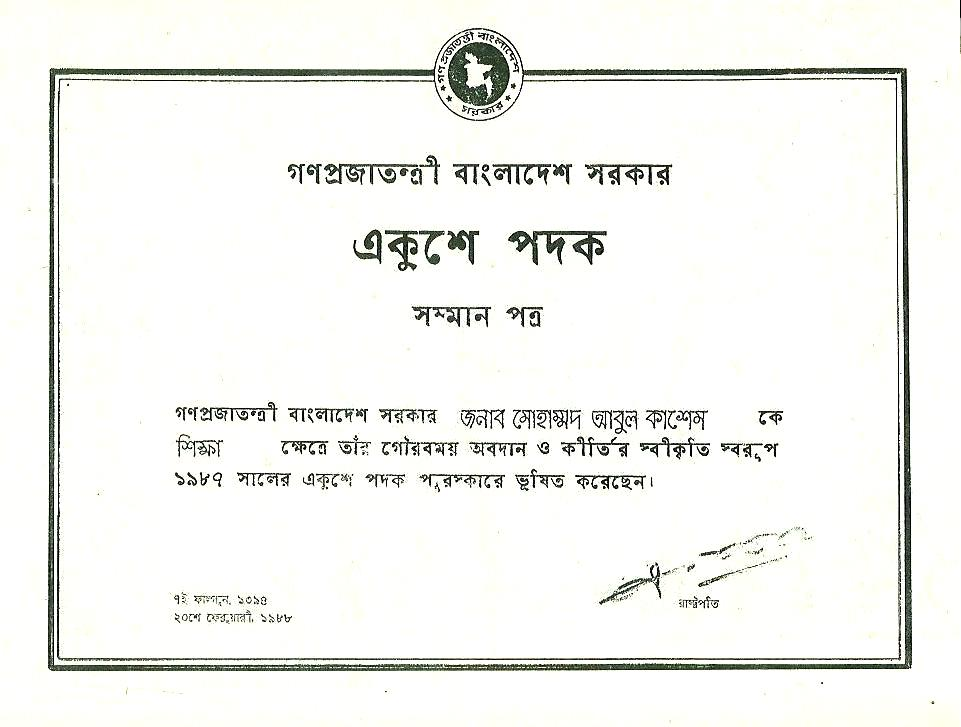
Certificate of Ekushey Padak awarded to Language Soldier Abul Kashem in Bengali language. (English translation : 'Government of the People's Republic of Bangladesh' 'Ekushey Padak' 'Letter of Honor' 'The Government of the People's Republic of Bangladesh has awarded the Ekushey Padak of 1987 to Mr. Mohammad Abul Kashem for his glorious contribution and achievement in the field of education.' '7 Falgun 1394', '20 February 1988' 'President')

Abul Kashem received a number of national and social awards, including Independence Day Award in 1993, Ekushey Padak in 1987, Bangla Academy Literary Award (for his book Biggan Somaj O Dhormo) in 1982, Islamic foundation Award in 1988, Pakistan Writers guild award in 1964 etc. He was accorded a national reception in Dhaka in 1989 which was attended by eminent scholars and litterateurs of Bangladesh and India. In 2007, Dhaka City Corporation named the former Darussalam Road of Mirpur-1 as Bhasha Sainik Principal Abul Kashem Road for his contribution to historic Language Movement.

Abul Kashem died at the Suhrawardy Hospital in Dhaka on Monday 11 March 1991.

== List of works ==
A prolific writer, Abul Kashem authored nearly 100 books including textbooks on science for postgraduate student and on education, Islam, culture and politics. These include 40 textbooks on physics and other science subjects for college and university levels. Some of his well-known books are:

=== Bengali ===
Islam
* ইসলাম কি দিয়েছে ও কি দিতে পারে	Islam Ki Diyeche O Ki Dite Pare	1952
* বুঝে নামাজ পড়	Buje Namaz Poro	1968
* ইসলামের রাষ্ট্রী্য় আদর্শ	Islamer Rashtio Adorsho	1980
* ইসলামী মেনিফেস্টো	Islami Manifesto	1952
* একমাত্র পথ	Akmatro Path	1949
* ঘোষনা	Ghoshona	1952
Islam & Science
* আধুনিক চিন্তাধারা	Oadunik Chintadhara	1968
* বিজ্ঞান বস্তুবাদ ও আল্লাহর অস্তিত্ব	Biggan Bostubadh O Allahor Ostitto	1968
* বিবর্তনবাদ সৃষ্টিতত্ত্ব ও আল্লাহর অস্তিত্ব	Bibortonbadh Sristitotto O Allahor Ostitto	1969
* বিজ্ঞান সমাজ ধর্ম	Biggan Shomaz Dhormo	1982
Economics
* কোরানিক অর্থনীতি	Quranic Orthoniti	1971
* পাকিস্তানের অর্থনীতি	Pakistaner Orthoniti	1965
International Politics
*তৃতীয় ব্লক আন্দোলন	Tritio Block Andolon	1952
History
*পাকিস্তানের রাষ্ট্রভাষা: বাংলা না উর্দু?	Pakistan er Rastrobhasha Bangla Na Urdu?	1947
*ভাষা আন্দোলনের ইতিহাস	Bhasha Andoloner Ithihash	1952
*আমাদের অতীত	Oamader Otit	1957
Bangla College Related
* বাংলা কলেজের চাকরীর নিয়মাবলী	Bangla Colleger Chakurir Niomaboli	1968
* বাংলা কলেজ প্রসঙ্গে	Bangla College Prosonge	1968 (2nd Edition)
* বাংলা কলেজ কি, কেন, এবং কিরুপ	Bangla College Ki, Keno, Abong Kirup	1962
* ঈর্ষা বনাম সাধনা	Irsha Bonab Shadona	1965
* বাংলা কলেজের অগ্রগতি ও ভবিষ্যৎ	Bangla Colleger Ogrogoti O Bhobishat	1964
Others
* শাসনতান্ত্রিক মুলনীতি	Oadunik Chintadhara	1968
* বৈজ্ঞানিক দৃষ্টিতে শ্রেণীসংগ্রাম	Boiganik Dhristite Srenisongram	1952
* মুক্তি কোন পথে	Mukti kon Pothe	1952
* ইসলামী রাষ্টনীতি	Islami rastroneeti	1967
* আমাদের ভাষার রুপ	Amader Bhashar Rhup	1962
* বাংলা প্রচলনের কয়েকটি সমস্যা	Bnagla Procholoner Koyekti Somosha	1967
* অফিস-আদালত ও শিক্ষার বাহনরুপে বাংলা প্রচলনের সমস্যা	office-Adaloter O Shikkhar Bahonrupe Bangla Procholoner Somosha	Unknown
* সহজ বাংলা	Shohoj Bangla	1974
* একুশ দফার রুপায়ন	Ekush daffer Rupaon	1953
* কৃষক ভাইয়ের জমি চাই	Krishok Bhaiyer Jomi Chai	Unknown
* শ্রমিক ভাইয়ের জমি চাই	Sromik Bhaiyer Jomi Chai	Unknown
* দুইটি প্রশ্ন	Duti Prosno	1955
* ভুলের পুনরাবৃত্তি	Bhuler Punorabritti	1953
* রাষ্টবিজ্ঞান	Rastrobiggan	1964
* সংগঠন	Songothon	1952
* আধুনিক কারবার পদ্ধতি	Adunik Karbar Poddoti	1966
* ছাত্র আন্দোলন	Chatro Andolon	1951
* প্রবন্ধ মঞ্জুষা	Probondho Monzusa	1989
Textbooks
* উচ্চমাধ্যমিক পদার্থিকা, ১ম খন্ড	Ucchomaddomik Podarthika 1st part	1964
* উচ্চমাধ্যমিক পদার্থিকা, ২য় খন্ড	Ucchomaddomik Podarthika 2nd part	1964
* উচ্চমাধ্যমিক ল্যাবরেটরী পদার্থিকা	Ucchomaddomik Laboratory Podarthika	1964
* উচ্চমাধ্যমিক রসায়ন, ১ম খন্ড (অজৈব)	Ucchomaddomik Rosayan, 1st part	1965
* উচ্চমাধ্যমিক রসায়ন, ২য় খন্ড (জৈব)	Ucchomaddomik Rosayan, 2nd part	1965
* উচ্চমাধ্যমিক ল্যাবরেটরী রসায়ন	Ucchomaddomik Laboratory Rosayan	1964
* উচ্চমাধ্যমিক এলজেব্রা	Ucchomaddomik Algebra	1964
* উচ্চমাধ্যমিক ক্যালকুলাস	Ucchomaddomik Calculus	1966
* উচ্চমাধ্যমিক জ্যামিতি	Ucchomaddomik Geometry	1964
* উচ্চমাধ্যমিক ডিনামিক্স	Ucchomaddomik Dynamics	1968
* উচ্চমাধ্যমিক ত্রিকোনমিতি	Ucchomaddomik Trigonometry	1964
* উচ্চমাধ্যমিক স্টেটিস্ক	Ucchomaddomik Statics	1967
* বিজ্ঞান প্রকাশ (৭ম ও ৮ম শ্রেণীর)	Bhiggan Prokash (for 7th and 8th grade)	1949
* বিজ্ঞান প্রকাশ (৯ম ও ১০ম শ্রেণীর)	Bhiggan Prokash (for 9th and 10th grade)	1949
* মাধ্যমিক ত্রিকোনমিতি	Maddomik Trigonometry	1964
* ডিগ্রি পদার্থিকা	Degree Padarthika	1971
* সহজ পদার্থিকা, ১ম খন্ড	Shohoj Padarthika, 1st Part	1974
* সহজ পদার্থিকা, ২য় খন্ড	Shohoj Padarthika, 2nd part	1974
* সহজ রসায়ন, ১ম খন্ড	Shohoj Rosaya, 1st part	1962
* সহজ রসায়ন, ২য় খন্ড	Shohoj Rosayan, 2nd part	1962
* ল্যাবরেটরী রসায়ন (৯ম ও ১০ম শ্রেণীর)	Laboratory Roshayan (9th and 10th grade)	1975
* ল্যাবরেটরী পদার্থবিজ্ঞান (৯ম ও ১০ম শ্রেণীর)	Laboratory Podarthobiggan (9th and 10th grade)	1975
* ল্যাবরেটরী জীববিজ্ঞান (৯ম ও ১০ম শ্রেণীর)	Laboratory Jibobiggan (9th and 10th grade)	1975

=== English ===
Islam & Science
* Islam Science & Modern Thoughts	1975
* Universal Ideology in the Light of Modern Thought	Unknown
Textbooks
* Degree Physics	1970
* General Properties of Matter	1955
* New Physics (1st part)	1955, 6th Edition 1966
* New Physics (2nd part)	1956, 6th Edition 1966
* Inter Physics Tutor part 1	1955
* Inter Physics Tutor part 2	1955
* Laboratory Physics	3rd Edition 1970
