= Fazlur Rahman (politician, born 1905) =

Politician of East Pakistan

- فضل الرحمٰن ফজলুর রহমান

Member of the Bengal Legislative Assembly
- In office 1937–1947

Minister of Education, Commerce and Refugees
- In office 1947–1954

Member of the National Assembly of Pakistan
- In office 1947–1958

Minister of Education and Commerce
- In office 1951–1953

Personal details
- Born: 1905 Shinepukur, Dohar, Dhaka, Bengal Presidency
- Died: 1966 (aged 60–61) East Pakistan
- Party: Muslim League
- Children: 2, including Salman F Rahman
- Relatives: Saber Hossain Chowdhury (nephew)

Fazlur Rahman (Bengali: ফজলুর রহমান, Urdu: فضل الرحمٰن; 1905–1966) was a Pakistani politician and lawyer from East Pakistan. He was the first Education Minister of Pakistan and a member of the 1st and 2nd National Assemblies of Pakistan.

== Early life and education ==
Fazlur Rahman was born in 1905 to an Urdu-speaking Muslim family in the village of Shinepukur, Dohar, Dhaka. He studied at Bharga High School and later obtained a Master of Arts degree in history in 1929. In 1933, he earned a BL degree.

== Career ==
After completing his education, Fazlur Rahman initially started in the law sector but participated in social work and politics. During this period, he was a part of the Bengal Provincial Muslim League's Working Committee as well as the All-India Muslim League's Central Committee. In 1937, he was elected as a member of the Bengal Legislative Assembly for Dacca. The council appointed him as chief whip in 1943. In 1946, Fazlur Rahman became the Revenue Minister of Bengal and was re-elected into the Bengal Legislative Council.

After the independence of Pakistan in 1947, he became a member of the country's first National Assembly and served in Liaquat Ali Khan's central cabinet in the Ministry of Interior, Information & Broadcasting, Education, Rehabilitation, Industries, Commerce and Works. At that time, he lived at The Anchorage in Kutchery Road, Karachi. He served in the former two ministries during Khwaja Nazimuddin's cabinet too in the early 1950s.

Fazlur Rahman represented the Dhaka University constituency at the 1954 East Bengal Legislative Assembly election as a Muslim League candidate. However, in 1955, he became an independent politician when the East Pakistan Provincial Assembly elected him to the 2nd National Assembly of Pakistan. He used to live at 15 Mary Road, Karachi, some time in this period. When I. I. Chundrigar became the Prime Minister of Pakistan, Fazlur Rahman was the Minister of Commerce, Finance and Law. Ayub Khan enforced the Elected Bodies Disqualification Order upon many politicians, including Fazlur Rahman. This disqualified Fazlur Rahman from partaking in politics for five years, and led to Fazlur Rahman's retirement.

== Pakistan Football Federation ==
Rahman served as president of the Pakistan Football Federation between 1948 and 1949.

== Views ==
Fazlur Rahman recognised the importance of education and history. Prior to independence, he was a member of the University of Calcutta's executive council and the Royal Asiatic Society of Bengal. He became the president of the Pakistan Historical Society after independence, and was a long-time member of the Dhaka University Court.

His popularity declined with the rise of the Bengali language movement as he supported Urdu as Pakistan's national language and suggested replacing the Bengali alphabet with the Perso-Arabic script.

== Family ==
Fazlur Rahman had two sons, Ahmed Sohail Fasihur Rahman and Salman F Rahman, with his wife, Syeda Fatina, who was a descendant of the Dewan family of Haibatnagar from her father's side.

== Death ==
Fazlur Rahman died in 1966.
