= Tamaddun Majlish =

Islamic cultural organization in Bangladesh

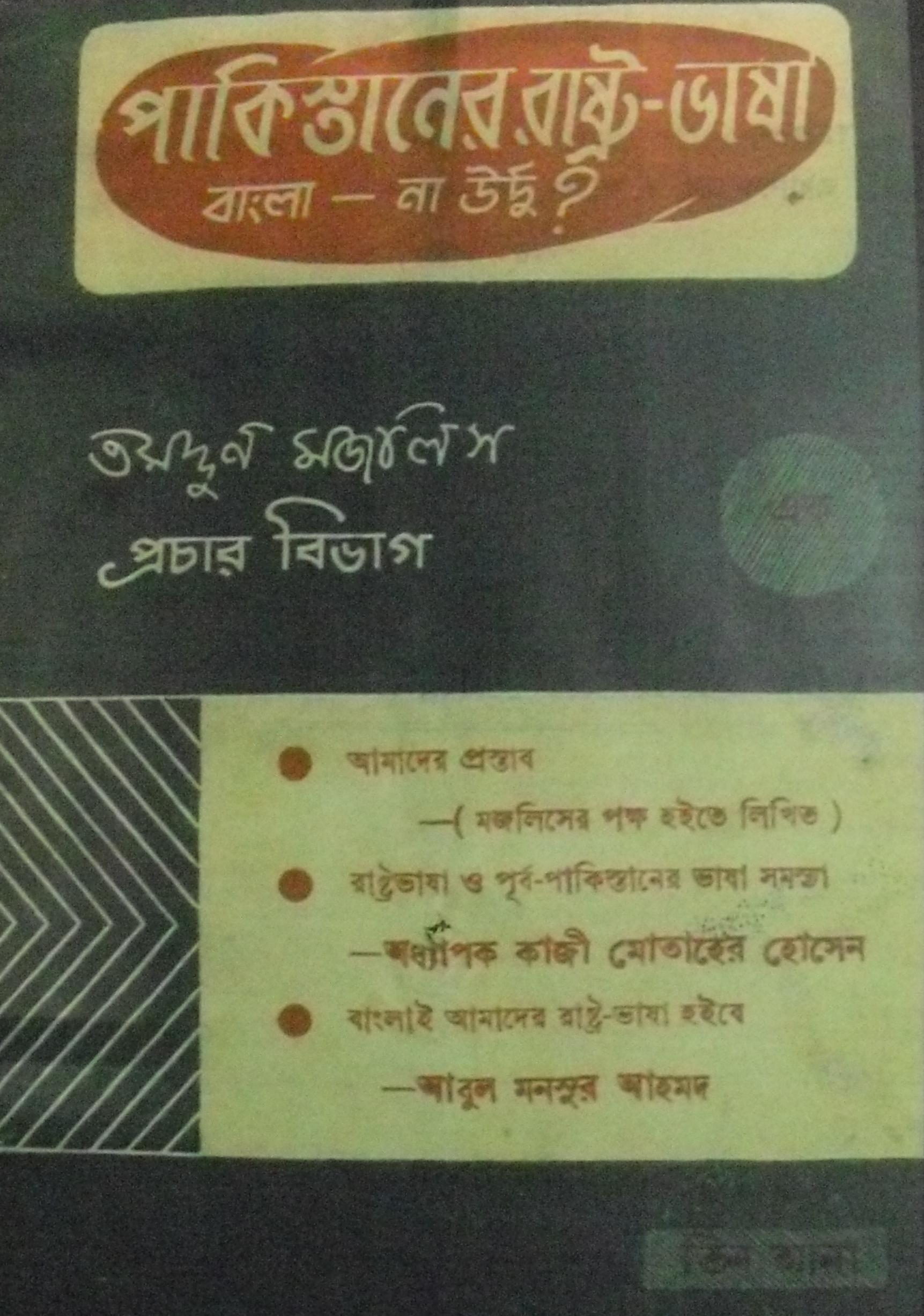
- "Pakistan's state language: Bengali or Urdu?" - The cover of a Tamaddun Majlish newsletter
- Formation: 2 September 1947; 78 years ago
- Founder: Principal Abul Kashem
- Headquarters: Moghbazar, Dhaka, Bangladesh

The Tamaddun Majlish (Bengali: তমদ্দুন মজলিশ), formerly Pakistan Tamaddun Majlish, is an Islamic cultural organization in Bangladesh, established in 1947 by Principal Abul Kashem in the former East Pakistan. It was one of the founding organizations of the Bengali language movement.

== Establishment and ideological background ==
Tamaddun Majlish was established in Dhaka immediately after the partition of India on 2 September 1947, by Principal Abul Kashem, a professor in the physics department of Dhaka University. At first it was very active, playing a vital role at the start of the Bengali language movement.

The members of the organization were strongly influenced by the mentality of the East Pakistan Renaissance Society. After the partition, they realized that Pakistan was no longer governed with the idealism that had been promised. This led most of the members of the Tamuddun Majlish to drift away from the Muslim League.

== Involvement in the Bengali Language Movement ==
Although the main intent of Tamaddun Majlish was to invigorate the Islamic spirit and culture of the new nation of Pakistan, the vigorous role played by this pro-Islamic organization made it clear to the Bengali-speaking Muslim population of East Pakistan that the demand to adopt Bengali as one of the state languages was "not at all motivated by the anti-state elements and communists of East Bengal." On 15 September 1947, Tamuddun Majlish issued a pamphlet titled Pakistaner Rashtra Bhasha: Bangla Na Urdu? ("Pakistan's State Language: Bengali or Urdu?"). The authors, Kazi Motahar Hossain, Abul Mansur Ahmed and Principal Abul Kashem (General Secretary of Tamuddun Majlish), made a strong case for introducing Bengali as the only language of instruction, offices and courts of East Bengal. They also forcefully articulated the demand for Bengali to be one of the State languages of Pakistan. The seminal booklet also contained a succinct proposal, authored by Principal Abul Kashem in favor of the Bengali language, the gist of which is:

1. Bengali should be:
  1. the medium of instruction in East Pakistan;
  2. the court language of East Pakistan; and
  3. the official language of East Pakistan.
2. Urdu and Bengali should be the two official languages of the central government of Pakistan.
3. Bengali should be the first language for the purpose of education in East Pakistan, to be learned by all the people;
  1. Urdu may be treated as the second language or inter-province language in East Pakistan, which can be taught as a second language to those people who will be working in West Pakistan. It will be more than adequate if Urdu is learned by only 5% to 10% of population of East Pakistan. Urdu may be taught in higher classes at the secondary school level in East Pakistan; and
  2. English should be the third or international language of East Pakistan.
4. Both English and Bengali should be used for a few years as the official languages in East Pakistan."

Aimed at providing organized resistance against the anti-Bengali policies of the central government of Pakistan and to protest against comments about the Bengali language and script made by Fazlur Rahman, the Central Education Minister, the Tamuddun Majlish took the lead in the formation of the first Rastrabhasa Sangram Parishad ("State Language Movement Council") in October 1947. While Nurul Huque Bhuyain of Dhaka University was elected to be the Convenor of the first Rastrabhasa Sangram Parishad, Abul Kashem, the general secretary of Tamudhun Majlish, played a key role in the early stages of the Bengali Language Movement by garnering widespread support for adopting Bengali as one of the state languages of Pakistan. He succeeded in enlisting the younger generations, and in particular the teachers and students of Dhaka University and other educational institutions. Thus, the first Rastrabhasa Sangram Parishad provided the organizational structure needed to launch the language movement in the latter part of 1947 and the early months of 1948.

The first protest meeting was convened on the campus of Dhaka University on 6 December 1947, under the auspices of Rastrabhasa Sangram Parishad, to protest the unilateral decision of the National Education Conference in Karachi to adopt Urdu as the only state language of Pakistan. The protest meeting attracted a large number of students, teachers and others from Dhaka University and other educational institutions. Abul Kashem presided over the protest meeting, and a number of students and teachers including Munir Choudhury, Abdur Rahman, Kallayan Dasgupta, A.K.M. Ahsan, S. Ahmed, and Farid Ahmed, the Vice President of Dhaka University Central Students Union (DUCSU), addressed the meeting.

The position of Tamuddun Majlish regarding the Bengali Language Movement also reflected the aspirations of the common people of East Bengal.

From 1948 to 1961, Tamaddun Majlish published a weekly called Saptahik Sainik as a mouthpiece of the Bengali Language Movement. The founding editor of the newspaper was the legendary writer Shahed Ali.

== Noteworthy members ==
Some noteworthy members of the organization were:

- Principal Abul Kashem
- Abul Hashim
- Dewan Mohammad Azraf
- Shahed Ali
- Nurul Huq Bhuiyan
- Shawkat Ali
- Kabi M.A.N Shahidullah shahittarotno
- Abdul Gafur
- Sanaullah Nuri
- Golam Azam
