= Nurul Huq Bhuiyan =

Bangladeshi language activist

- নূরুল হক ভূঁইয়া

Nurul Haque Bhuiyan was a Bengali activist.

== Career ==
Bhuiyan was a professor of Department of Chemistry and Applied Chemistry at the University of Dhaka during 1946–1994. He was a senior leader of the Tamaddun Majlish and the first convener of the Rastrabhasa Sangram Parishad during the Language Movement. He was the founder provost of Sir A F Rahman Hall of the University of Dhaka. He was the first convenor of the Language Movement during October 1947 - February 1948.
