= Rastrabhasa Sangram Parishad =

Leading organisation in the Bengali language movement

The Rashtrabhasha Sangram Parishad (National Language Action Committee) was an organisation founded by Bengali politicians and intellectuals to agitate for the recognition of the Bengali language by the government of Pakistan. It was established on 1 October 1947 by Nurul Bhuiyan. It became one of the most influential groups during the Bengali language movement.

Tamaddun Majlish catalyzed the foundation of the first Rashtrabhasha Sangram Parishad. It was founded at the end of December in 1947. Founding convener of the committee was Nurul Huq Bhuiyan. Other founding members were Shamsul Alam, Abul Khaer, Abdul Wahed Choudhury and Oli Ahad. Later the committee was expanded as Mohammad Toaha and Syed Nazrul Islam joined in. According to first convener Bhuiyan, all the activities of the committee were kept in secret during that time.

In January 1948, Rashtrabhasha Sangram Parishad organized a meeting with Art and Science faculty of Dhaka University to give Bengali more exposure within the country. The meeting proposed to start Bengali as the medium of education from the primary level.
