= Bengali language movement =

1948–1956 political movement in East Pakistan

Bengali Language Movement
- State Language Movement; Part of Bangladesh independence movement
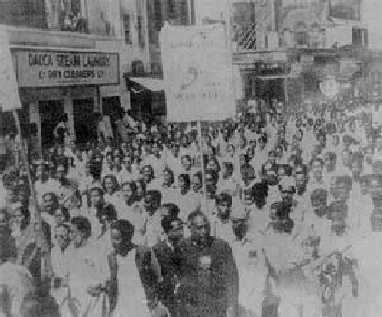
- Procession held in Dhaka on February 21, 1952
- Date: 1947–1956
- Location: East Bengal, then part of Dominion of Pakistan (present-day Bangladesh)
- Caused by: Pakistan's central government decision to make Urdu the sole state language
- Methods: Protest; Strike; March
- Result: Raise of Bengali nationalism; Muslim League loss of majority in Pakistan Constituent Assembly and East Bengal Legislative Assembly in 1954; Bengali declared as the official language of Pakistan alongside Urdu in 1956

Parties
State Language Action Committee; All-Parties Central State Language Action Committee; Pakistan Tamaddun Majlish; East Pakistan Renaissance Society; Dhaka University Central Student's Union; Students of Dhaka University; Bengali civilians	Government of Pakistan; Pakistan Armed Forces; Pakistan Army; Military police; East Pakistan Rifles; East Pakistan Ansar; (Pakistan) Government of East Bengal; East Bengal Police; The people of Mohajer; Pakistan Muslim League; East Bengal Provincial Muslim League

Lead figures
Collective leadership	(Pakistan) Muhammad Ali Jinnah; (Pakistan) Sir Khawaja Nazimuddin; (Pakistan) Liaquat Ali Khan; (Pakistan) Sir Ghulam Muhammad; (Pakistan) Iskander Mirza; (Pakistan) Fazlur Rahman; (Pakistan) Nurul Amin

The Bengali language movement (Note: Bengali: বাংলা ভাষা আন্দোলন, romanized: Bangla bhasha andōlonpronounced [ˈbaŋlaˑ ˈbʱaʃaˑ ˈand̪olɔn]) was a political movement in East Bengal (Note: Renamed East Pakistan in 1955. East Bengal was the administrative division of the Dominion of Pakistan corresponding to today's Bangladesh from 1947 to 1955.) in 1952, advocating the recognition of the Bengali language as a co-lingua franca of the Dominion of Pakistan. The movement wanted to allow its use in government affairs, the continuation of its use as a medium of education, its use in media, currency and stamps, and to maintain its writing in the Bengali alphabet and Bengali script.

When the Dominion of Pakistan was formed after the separation of the Indian subcontinent in 1947, when the British left, it was composed of various ethnic and linguistic groups, with the geographically non-contiguous East Bengal province having a mainly ethnic Bengali population. In 1948, the Government of the Dominion of Pakistan ordained as part of Islamization of East Pakistan or East Bengal that Urdu will be the sole federal language, alternately Bengali writing in the Perso-Arabic script or Roman script (Romanisation of Bengali) or Arabic as the state language of the whole of Pakistan was also proposed, sparking extensive protests among the Bengali-speaking majority of East Bengal. Facing rising sectarian tensions and mass discontent with the new law, the government outlawed public meetings and rallies. The students of the University of Dhaka and other political activists defied the law and organised a protest on 21 February 1952. The movement reached its climax when police killed student demonstrators on that day. The deaths provoked widespread civil unrest. After years of conflict, the central government relented and granted official status to the Bengali language in 1956.

The Language Movement catalysed the assertion of Bengali national identity in East Bengal and later East Pakistan, and became a forerunner to Bengali nationalist movements, including the 6-Point Movement and subsequently the Bangladesh Liberation War and the Bengali Language Implementation Act, 1987. In Bangladesh, 21 February (Ekushey February) is observed as Language Movement Day, a national holiday. The Shaheed Minar monument was constructed near Dhaka Medical College in memory of the movement and its victims. On 17 November 1999, UNESCO declared 21 February as International Mother Language Day, in tribute to the Language Movement and the ethnolinguistic rights of people around the world.

== Background ==
The present-day nations of Pakistan and Bangladesh were part of the British Indian Empire. From the mid-19th century, the Urdu language had been promoted as the lingua franca of Indian Muslims by political and religious leaders, such as Sir Khwaja Salimullah, Sir Syed Ahmed Khan, Nawab Viqar-ul-Mulk and Maulvi Abdul Haq. Urdu is a Central Indo-Aryan language of the Indo-Iranian branch, closely related to Hindi and belonging to the Indo-European family of languages. It developed under Persian, Arabic and Turkic influence on apabhramshas (last linguistic stage of the medieval Indian Aryan language Pali–Prakrit) in South Asia during the Delhi Sultanate and Mughal Empire. With its Perso-Arabic script, the language was considered a vital element of the Islamic culture for Indian Muslims; Hindi and the Devanagari script were seen as fundamentals of Hindu culture.

While Urdu became common among Muslims in northern India, Muslims in Bengal—then a province in the eastern part of British India—primarily spoke Bengali. Bengali is an Eastern Indo-Aryan language that arose from the eastern Middle Indic languages around 1000 CE and developed considerably with a rich literature, history and cultural identity. Unlike many other Indic Languages, Bengali got patronage from the States and Empires in the Middle Ages. During the Bengal Renaissance, the modern Bengali literature developed its stronghold. Bengalis irrespective of religious identity used Bengali language. Supporters of Bengali opposed Urdu even before the partition of India, when delegates from Bengal rejected the idea of making Urdu the lingua franca of Muslim India in the 1937 Lucknow session of the All-India Muslim League. The Muslim League was a British Indian political party that became the driving force behind the creation of Pakistan as a Muslim state separate from British India.

== Early stages of the movement ==
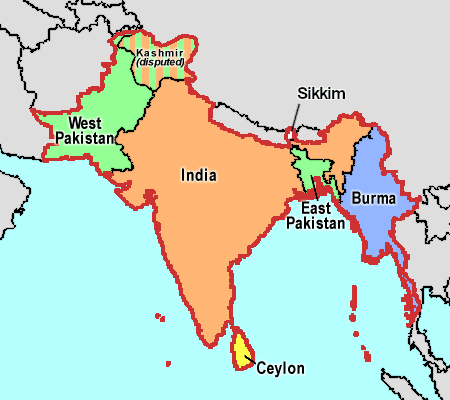
Britain's holdings on the Indian subcontinent were granted independence in 1947 and 1948, becoming four new independent states: the Dominion of India, the Union of Burma (now Myanmar), Dominion of Ceylon (now Sri Lanka), and the Dominion of Pakistan (including East Bengal, from 1956 East Pakistan, 1971-today Bangladesh).

After the partition of India in 1947, Bengali-speaking people in East Bengal, the non-contiguous eastern part of the Dominion of Pakistan, made up 44 million of the newly formed Dominion of Pakistan's 69 million people. The Dominion of Pakistan's government, civil services, and military, however, were dominated by personnel from the western wing of the Dominion of Pakistan. In November 1947, a key resolution at a national education summit in Karachi advocated Urdu and English as the sole state languages. Opposition and protests arose immediately. Students from Dhaka rallied under the leadership of Abul Kashem, the secretary of Tamaddun Majlish, a Bengali Islamic cultural organisation. The meeting stipulated Bengali as an official language of the Dominion of Pakistan and as a medium of education in East Bengal. However, the Pakistan Public Service Commission removed Bengali from the list of approved subjects, as well as from currency notes and stamps. The central education minister Fazlur Rahman made extensive preparations to make Urdu the only state language of the Dominion of Pakistan. Public outrage spread, and many Bengali students met on the University of Dhaka campus on 8 December 1947 to formally demand that Bengali be made an official language. To promote their cause, Bengali students organised processions and rallies in Dhaka.

Leading Bengali scholars argued why Urdu should not be the only state language. The writer Abul Mansur Ahmed said if Urdu became the state language, the educated society of East Bengal would become 'illiterate' and 'ineligible' for government positions. The first Rastrabhasa Sangram Parishad (National Language Action Committee), an organisation in favour of Bengali as a state language was formed towards the end of December 1947. Professor Nurul Huq Bhuiyan of the Tamaddun Majlish convened the committee. Later, Parliament member Shamsul Huq convened a new committee to push for Bengali as a state language.

=== Dhirendranath Datta's proposal ===
Dhirendranath was the key figure to raise the demand for Bengali with its traditional script as a state language in Pakistan assembly.

Assembly member Dhirendranath Datta proposed legislation in the Constituent Assembly of Pakistan to allow members to speak in Bengali and authorise its use for official purposes. Datta's proposal was supported by legislators Prem Hari Burman, Bhupendra Kumar Datta and Sris Chandra Chattaopadhyaya of East Bengal, as well as the people from the region. Prime minister Liaquat Ali Khan and the Muslim League denounced the proposal as an attempt to divide the Pakistani people, thus the legislation was defeated.

=== Fazlur Rahman's proposal ===
Since the partition of the country in 1947, the Union Minister representing East Pakistan Fazlur Rahman campaigned for the implementation of Bengali language written in Arabic script (Bengali language with the "Hurful Qur'an"). At the Nikhil Pakistan Teachers' Conference held in Karachi on 29 December 1948, Fazlur Rahman proposed to write Bengali in Arabic script for the sake of Islamization of the language. East Bengal Provincial Education Department Secretary Fazle Ahmad Karim Fazli was one of the main initiators of the effort to introduce the Arabic alphabet in Bengal. Both Karim Fazli and Fazlur Rahman established a society called 'Hurful Qur'an Samity' with a Maulana named Zulfikar Ali of Chittagong and tried to form a movement to introduce Arabic letters in Bengal through him. Abdul Hakim, the former director of the East-Bengal Education Department said; "Some funny legends are heard in Dhaka about a Bengali Wazir Sahib's own knowledge of Urdu. He wanted to fulfill his ardent desire to beautify the in order to be admired by the all-powerful Urdu Mahal of the Centre. For this purpose, a sum of Rs. 35,000 per annum for the publication of books was arranged to hand over the central sanction to the aforesaid Provincial Education Secretary." In response, Muhammad Shahidullah opposed the proposal, fearing further complications, and advocated making Bengali unchanged as the state language of East Bengal and one of the state languages of Pakistan.

=== Proposal for Romanisation of Bengali ===
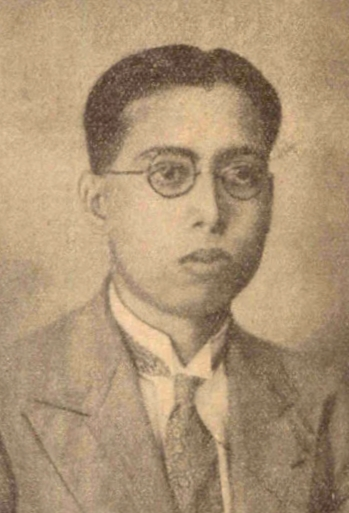
Muhammad Qudrat-i-Khuda proposed the romanisation of Bengali in the early stage of language movement.

During that time, romanisation of Bengali was also proposed along with other proposals regarding the determination of the state language of Pakistan. After 1947, many other East Pakistani academics, including Muhammad Qudrat-i-Khuda and Nazirul Islam Mohammad Sufian, supported the idea of writing Bengali in Roman script. In 1948, Mohammad Ferdous Khan opposed it in his pamphlet "The language problem of today".

Abul Fazl Muhammad Akhtar-ud-Din supported the Roman alphabet in his article entitled "Bangla Bornomalar Poribortton" (বাংলা বর্ণমালার পরিবর্ত্তন, Changes in the Bengali Alphabet) published in Daily Azad on 18 April 1949.

The romanisation proposal continued on even after 1952. In 1957, the East Pakistan Education Commission recommended the use of the revised Roman script in adult education.

Around 1957–1958, there was a significant demand for the use of Roman letters again. At that time Muhammad Abdul Hai and Muhammad Enamul Haque opposed it.

=== Agitations of 1948 ===
Students of the University of Dhaka and other colleges of the city organised a general strike on 11 March 1948 to protest the omission of Bengali language from official use, including coins, stamps and recruitment tests for the navy. The movement restated the demand that Bengali be declared an official language of the Dominion of Pakistan. Political leaders such as Shamsul Huq, Sheikh Mujibur Rahman, Shawkat Ali, M Sirajul Islam, Kazi Golam Mahboob, Oli Ahad, Abdul Wahed and others were arrested during the rallies.

=== Agreement with Khawaja Nazimuddin ===
In the afternoon of 11 March, a meeting was held to protest police brutality and arrests. A group of students marching towards the chief minister Khawaja Nazimuddin's house was stopped in front of the Dhaka High Court. The rally changed its direction and moved in the direction of the Secretariat building. Police attacked the procession injuring several students and leaders, including A. K. Fazlul Huq. Continuing strikes were observed the following four days. Under such circumstances, the chief minister Nazimuddin signed an accord with the student leaders agreeing to some terms and conditions, without complying to the demand that Bengali be made a state language. On 6 April 1948, in East Bengal Assembly resolution was passed making Bengali an official language of the province by Nazimuddin led Muslim League government of East Bengal.

=== Liaquat Ali Khan's visit to Dhaka ===
On November 18, 1948, the first Prime Minister of Pakistan Liaquat Ali Khan visited East Pakistan. On November 27, he addressed a student meeting at the playground of Dhaka University. In that meeting, the demand for Bengali language in the certificate issued by the Dhaka University Central Student Union was again raised, but he refrained from making any comments. In a meeting of the National Language Working Council held under the chairmanship of Ataur Rahman Khan on November 17, Aziz Ahmad, Abul Kashem, Sheikh Mujibur Rahman, Kamruddin Ahmed, Abdul Mannan, Tajuddin Ahmed and others drafted a memorandum and sent it to Prime Minister Liaquat Ali Khan. The Prime Minister did not respond to this either.

=== Muhammad Ali Jinnah's visit to Dhaka ===
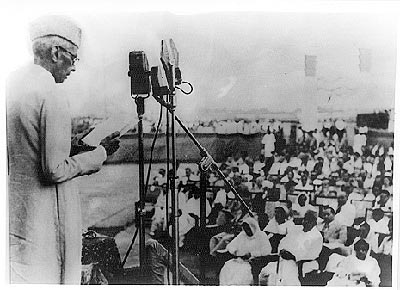
Muhammad Ali Jinnah on 21 March 1948 told at a public meeting that State language of Pakistan is going to be Urdu and no other language.

After the height of civic unrest, Governor-General of Pakistan Muhammad Ali Jinnah arrived in Dhaka on 19 March 1948. On 21 March, at a civic reception at Race Course Maidan, he claimed that the language issue was designed by a "fifth column" to divide Pakistani Muslims. Jinnah further declared, in English, that "Urdu, and only Urdu" embodied the spirit of Muslim nations and would remain as the state language, labelling those who disagreed with his views as "Enemies of Pakistan". Jinnah delivered a similar speech at Curzon Hall of the University of Dhaka on 24 March where Language activist Abdul Matin stood up at the chair and shouted, No. It can not be. Other students also supported him during that time. Thus at both meetings, Jinnah was interrupted by large segments of the audience. He later called a meeting of a state language committee of action and overruled the contract that was signed by Khawaja Nazimuddin with the student leaders. On 28 March, the day before leaving Dhaka, Jinnah gave a radio address reasserting his "Urdu-only" policy.

=== Proposal for Arabic language ===
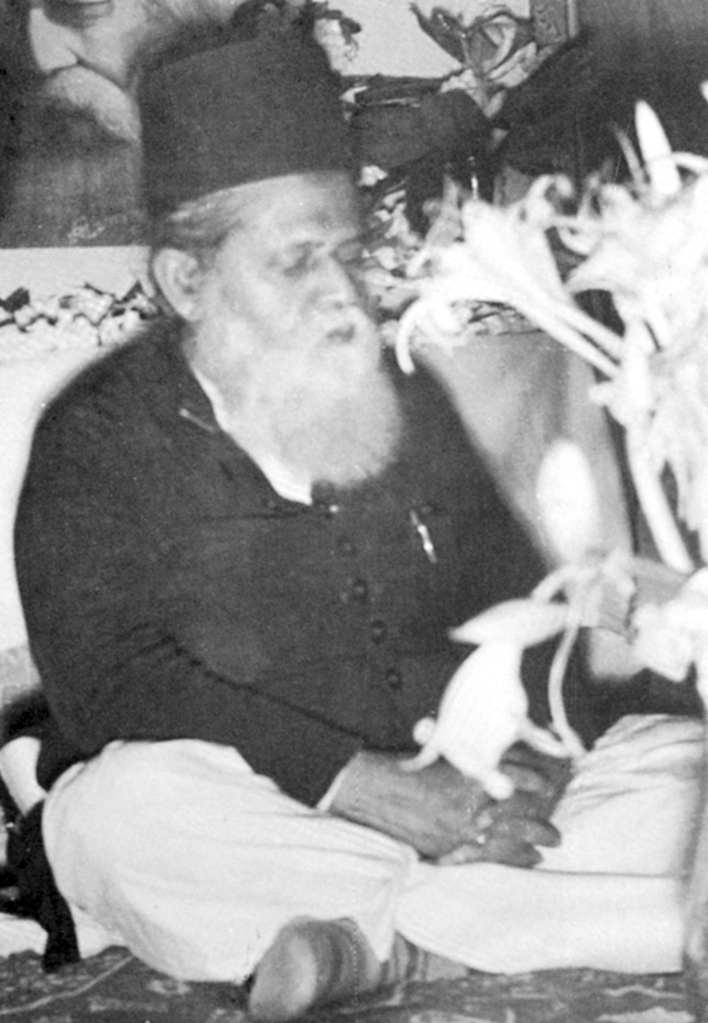
Muhammad Shahidullah was a central figure in the proposal to make Arabic the state language.

Muhammad Shahidullah believed that Bengalis could learn Urdu at the same time as learning English, he also believed that: "When Arabic becomes the state language of Pakistan, the creation of the state of Pakistan will be justified." Therefore, in December 1949, he assumed the presidency of the East Pakistan Arabic Language Association, approved a draft memorandum to be submitted to the Assembly, where it was requested to government for Arabic to be made the state language of Pakistan and for the provision of 'Darse Koran' or Quran teaching in various centers and mosques of the city. On January 18, 1950, some students of Rajshahi College called a meeting to demand that Arabic be made the state language. The State Bank Governor Zahid Hussain proposed to make Arabic the state language and this proposal was then supported by Syed Akbar Shah, member of Sindh Legislative Council and Vice-Chancellor of Sindh Arabic University. On 1 February 1951 at the session of the World Muslim Conference in Karachi, the leader of the Ismaili community Aga Khan said, if Arabic is made the state language of Pakistan, common communication will be established between the Muslims of the Arab world, North Africa and Indonesia. On February 10, 1951, the Secretary of the Pakistan Buddhist League, Rabindranath Burmi, issued a statement opposing these proposals in favour of Urdu instead of Arabic as state language. These proposals to make Arabic the state language did not gain much support in any part of Pakistan. However, according to Badruddin Umar, as this demand was related to the question of development of Islamic culture, it indirectly supported the demand of the introduction of Arabic script in Bengali language to some extent in some groups.

=== Proposal by Language Committee ===
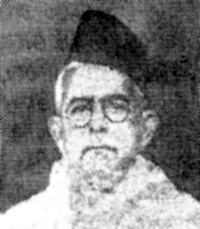
East Bengal Language Committee headed by Muhammad Akram Khan recommended writing Bengali through Arabic characters.

Shortly thereafter, the East Bengal Language Committee, presided by Maulana Akram Khan, was formed by the East Bengal government to prepare a report on the language problem.

At 1949, Language Committee of the East-Bengal Government conducted a survey among teachers, intellectuals, high civil servants, members of the Legislative Council, according to which, out of 301 respondents, 96 favoured the introduction of the Arabic script, 18 the Roman script and 187 gave opinion in favour of the retention of the Bengali script. Besides, many people did not give any answer.

== Events of 1952 ==
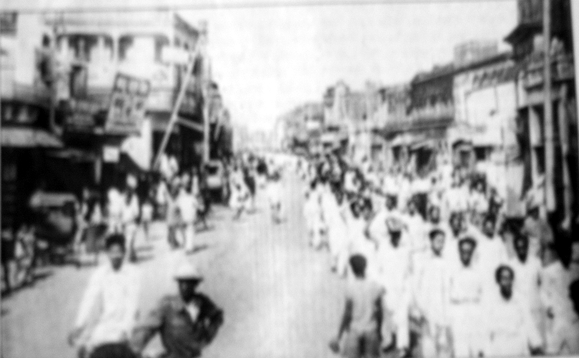
Procession march held on 4 February 1952 at Nawabpur Road, Dhaka

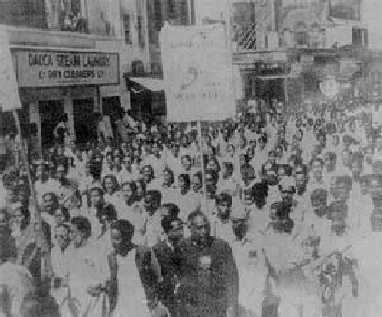
Procession march held on 21 February 1952 in Dhaka

The Urdu-Bengali controversy was reignited when Liaqat Ali Khan's successor, Prime Minister Khawaja Nazimuddin, staunchly defended the "Urdu-only" policy in a speech on 27 January 1952. On 31 January, the Shorbodolio Kendrio Rashtrobhasha Kormi Porishod (All-Party Central Language Action Committee) was formed in a meeting at the Bar Library Hall of the University of Dhaka, chaired by Maulana Bhashani. The central government's proposal of writing the Bengali language in Arabic script by Pakistan's Bengali education minister Fazlur Rahman was vehemently opposed at the meeting. The action committee called for an all out protest on 21 February, including strikes and rallies. In an attempt to prevent the demonstration, the provincial government of chief minister Nurul Amin, imposed Section 144 in Dhaka, thereby banning any gathering.

On February 11, 1952, a long circular (No. 10) titled 'Rashtra Bhashar Andolan' was promoted to the Secretariat of the Bengali Provincial Organizing Committee before the Communist Party of Pakistan'. In this circular, the Communist Party's statement, line, and organizational duties regarding the language movement are clearly indicated.

In accordance with the principles and lines of the State Language Movement laid down in Party Circular No. 10 of the East Bengal Organizing Committee of the Communist Party of Pakistan dated February 11, they circulated a cyclostyled manifesto on February 20, which read, "Respond to the call of the All-Union State Language Working Committee. Do strike, hartal, meeting and march across the province on 21st February to demand Bengali as one of the national languages with equal status for all languages." This brief manifesto calls for, "English shall no longer be the official language; Want equality of all languages of Pakistan; Bengalis, Punjabis, Pathans, Sindhis, Balochs, Urdu speakers etc. have to be given the right to get education in their own mother tongue and conduct government affairs; We want to make Bengali language one of the national languages. Instead of English, Urdu, Bengali - the movement to give equal status to all languages in the state. English made English as the state language in order to continue the imperialist and feudal system of exploitation while keeping the various linguistic communities of Pak-India backward. The League government also adopted English as the state language for the same purpose; has kept and wants to make the only child the state language. Making one language the state language will leave the various linguistic communities of Pakistan backward and will hinder the overall development of Pakistan. Therefore, all the Bengali, Punjabi, Pathan, Siddhi, Belche, Urdu speaking nations of Pakistan should come together in the movement to give equal status to the different languages of Pakistan and make them the state language."

=== 21 February ===
At nine o'clock in the morning, students began gathering on the University of Dhaka premises in defiance of Section 144. The university vice-chancellor and other officials were present as armed police surrounded the campus. By a quarter past eleven, students gathered at the university gate and attempted to break the police line. Police fired tear gas shells towards the gate to warn the students. A section of students ran into the Dhaka Medical College while others rallied towards the university premises cordoned by the police. The vice-chancellor asked police to stop firing and ordered the students to leave the area. However, the police arrested several students for violating section 144 as they attempted to leave. Enraged by the arrests, the students met around the East Bengal Legislative Assembly and blocked the legislators' way, asking them to present their insistence at the assembly. When a group of students sought to storm into the building, police opened fire and killed a number of students, including Abdus Salam, Rafiq Uddin Ahmed, Abul Barkat and Abdul Jabbar. The Government reported that 3 people died and 69 were injured on that day. As the news of the killings spread, disorder erupted across the city. Shops, offices and public transport were shut down and a general strike began. At the assembly, six legislators including Manoranjan Dhar, Boshontokumar Das, Shamsuddin Ahmed and Dhirendranath Datta requested that chief minister Nurul Amin visit wounded students in hospital and that the assembly be adjourned as a sign of mourning. This motion was supported by some treasury bench members including Maulana Abdur Rashid Tarkabagish, Shorfuddin Ahmed, Shamsuddin Ahmed Khondokar and Mosihuddin Ahmed. However, Nurul Amin refused the requests.

On the same day, the East Bengal Organizing Committee of the East Pakistan Communist Party circulated a cyclostyled manifesto entitled "To build a united East Bengal Tumdal United Movement against the barbaric killings of the tyrant Nurul Amin government", calling on all institutions and the multi-lingual public of Pakistan, regardless of party affiliation. Support is invited for the following demands:

- Leaving chair by Nazim Nurul Amin Sarkar
- Want to make Bengali one of the national languages immediately
- We want the punishment of the killer, we want a private commission of inquiry, we want full compensation for the dead and injured.
- Seek immediate release of all political prisoners,
- Demand withdrawal of Security Act, Section 144 and all repressive laws.

=== 22 February ===
Disorder spread across the province as large processions ignored section 144 and condemned the actions of the police. More than 30,000 people congregated at Curzon Hall in Dhaka. During the continued protests, police actions led to the death of four more people. This prompted officers and clerks from different organisations, including colleges, banks and the radio station, to boycott offices and join the procession. Protesters burned the offices of two leading pro-government news agencies, the Jubilee Press and the Morning News. Police fired on a major janaza, or mourning rally, as it was passing through Nawabpur Road. The shooting killed several people including activist Sofiur Rahman and a nine-year-old boy named Ohiullah.

=== Continued unrest ===
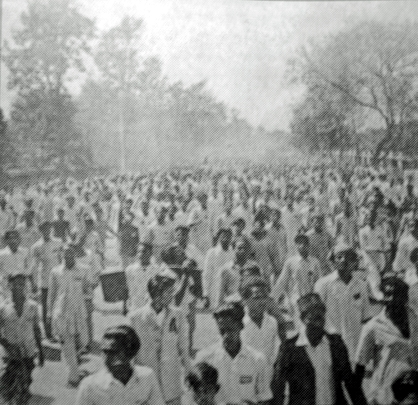
22 February rally after janaja at Dhaka Medical College on the University Dhaka road, Dhaka

Through the night of 23 February, students of Dhaka Medical College worked on the construction of a Shaheed Smritistombho, or Monument of Martyrs. Completed at dawn on 24 February, the monument had a handwritten note attached to it with the words "Shaheed Smritistombho". Inaugurated by the father of the slain activist Sofiur Rahman, the monument was destroyed on 26 February by police. On 25 February, industrial workers in the town of Narayanganj observed a general strike. A protest followed on 29 February whose participants faced severe police beating.

The government censored news reports and withheld exact casualty figures during the protests. Most pro-government media held Hindus and communists responsible for encouraging the disorder and student unrest. The families of Abul Barkat and Rafiq Uddin Ahmed tried to charge the police with murder, but the charges were dismissed by the police. On 8 April government report on the incidents failed to show any particular justification for police firings on the students.

=== Reaction in West Pakistan ===
Although the Language Movement is considered to have laid the foundations for ethnic nationalism in many of the Bengalis of East Bengal and later East Pakistan, it also heightened the cultural animosity between the authorities of the two wings of Pakistan. In the western wing of the Dominion of Pakistan, the movement was seen as a sectional uprising against Pakistani national interests. The rejection of the "Urdu-only" policy was seen as a contravention of the Perso-Arabic culture of Muslims and the founding ideology of Pakistan, the two-nation theory. Some of the most powerful politicians from the western wing of Pakistan considered Urdu a product of Indian Islamic culture, but saw Bengali as a part of "Hinduized" Bengali culture. Most stood by the "Urdu only" policy because they believed that only a single language, one that was not indigenous to Pakistan, should serve as the national language. This kind of thinking also provoked considerable opposition in the western wing, wherein there existed several linguistic groups. As late as in 1967, military dictator Ayub Khan said, "East Bengal is ... still under considerable Hindu culture and influence."

== Aftermath ==
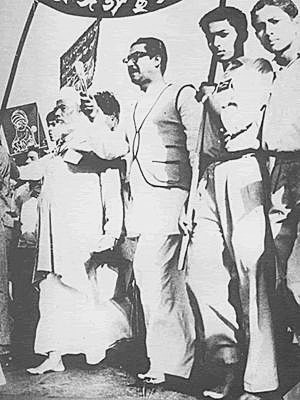
Sheikh Mujibur Rahman (centre) and Maulana Abdul Hamid Khan Bhashani (left) marching barefoot to pay tribute at Shaheed Minar (Martyrs' monument) in Dhaka on 21 February 1954

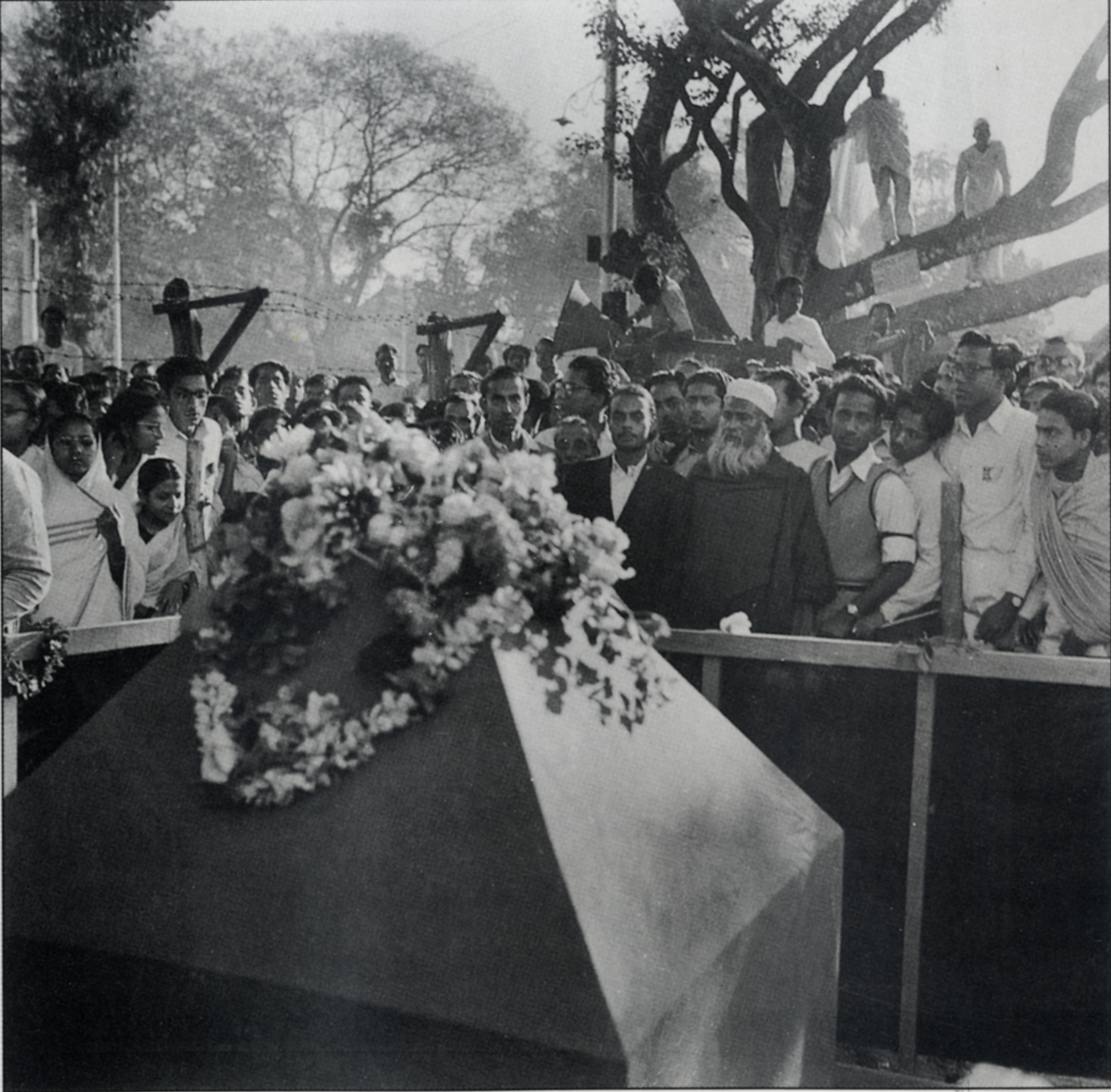
Maulana Bhashani after the foundation stone laying program for Shaheed Minar by Abul Barkat's family members on 21 February 1956

The Shorbodolio Kendrio Rashtrobhasha Kormi Porishod, with support from the Awami Muslim League, decided to commemorate 21 February as Shohid Dibosh. On the first anniversary of the protests, people across East Bengal wore black badges in solidarity with the victims. Most offices, banks and educational institutions were closed to observe the occasion. Student groups made agreements with college and police officials to preserve law and order. More than 100,000 people assembled at a public meeting held in Dhaka, where community leaders called for the immediate release of Maulana Bhashani and other political prisoners. However, Pakistani politicians such as Fazlur Rahman aggravated sectional tensions by declaring that anyone who wanted Bengali to become an official language would be considered an "enemy of the state". Bengali students and civilians disobeyed the restrictions to celebrate the anniversary of the protests. Demonstrations broke out on the night of 21 February 1954 with various halls of the University of Dhaka raising black flags in mourning.

=== United Front in 1954 ===
Political tensions came to a held as elections to the provincial assembly of East Bengal were held in 1954. The ruling Muslim League denounced the opposition United Front coalition, which—led by A. K. Fazlul Huq and the Awami League—wanted greater provincial autonomy. Several United Front leaders and activists were arrested. A meeting of parliament's Muslim League members, chaired by prime minister Muhammad Ali Bogra, resolved to give official recognition to Bengali. This decision was followed by a major wave of unrest as other ethnic groups sought recognition of other regional languages. Proponents of Urdu such as Maulvi Abdul Haq condemned any proposal to grant official status to Bengali. He led a rally of 100,000 people to protest against the Muslim League's decision. Consequently, the implementation failed and the United Front won a vast majority of seats in the legislative assembly, while the representation of the Muslim League was reduced to a historic low.

The First United Front ministry ordered the creation of the Bangla Academy to promote, develop, and preserve Bengali language, literature, and heritage. However, the United Front rule was temporary, as Governor General Ghulam Muhammad cancelled the government and started Governor's rule on 30 May 1954. The United Front again formed the ministry on 6 June 1955 after the governor's regime ended. The Awami League did not participate in this ministry though.

Following the return of the United Front to power, the anniversary on 21 February 1956 was observed for the first time in a peaceful atmosphere. The Government supported a major project to construct a new Shaheed Minar. The session of the constituent assembly was stopped for five minutes to express condolence for the students slain in the police shootings. Major rallies were organised by Bengali leaders and all public offices and businesses remained closed.

=== Constitutional status as a state language ===
State emblem of Pakistan was adopted with Bengali translation of the national motto Faith, Unity, Discipline.

With the defeat of the Muslim League in the East Bengal assembly elections, the central government became flexible in recognising Bengali as the state language of Pakistan along with Urdu. At least a few thousand people protested in the National Assembly on April 22 against the decision.

On 7 May 1954, the constituent assembly resolved, with the Muslim League's support, to grant official status to Bengali. Bengali was adopted as an official language of Pakistan along with Urdu in the article 214(1) when the first constitution of Pakistan was enacted on 29 February 1956. Mohammad Ali Bogra raised the language related clauses of the constitution in Parliament. According to the clauses, Bengali language was given equal recognition as state language like Urdu. In Parliament and the Legislative Assembly, besides Urdu and English, there was an opportunity to speak in Bengali. The constitution also provided opportunities for higher education in Bengali.

However, the military government formed by Ayub Khan made attempts to re-establish Urdu as the sole national language. On 6 January 1959, the military regime issued an official statement and reinstated the official stance of supporting the 1956 constitution's policy of two state languages.

=== Standard Bengali Movement ===
The Bengali language movement and the banning of Rabindranath Tagore's works by the central government of Pakistan led to a movement by the intellectuals of Dhaka that led to an increase in the use of Central Standard Bengali in the city in the 1950s and 1960s.

=== Independence of Bangladesh ===
Although the question of official languages was settled by 1956, the military regime of Ayub Khan promoted the interests of West Pakistan at the expense of East Pakistan. Despite forming the majority of the national population, the East Pakistani population continued to be under-represented in the civil and military services, and received a minority of state funding and other government help. Due to regional economic, social, and political imbalances, sectional divisions grew, and the Bengali ethnic nationalist Awami League invoked the 6-point movement for greater provincial autonomy. One demand was that East Pakistan be called Bangladesh (Land/Country of Bengal), which subsequently led to the Bangladesh Liberation War.

== Cultural impact and celebration ==
=== Bangladesh ===
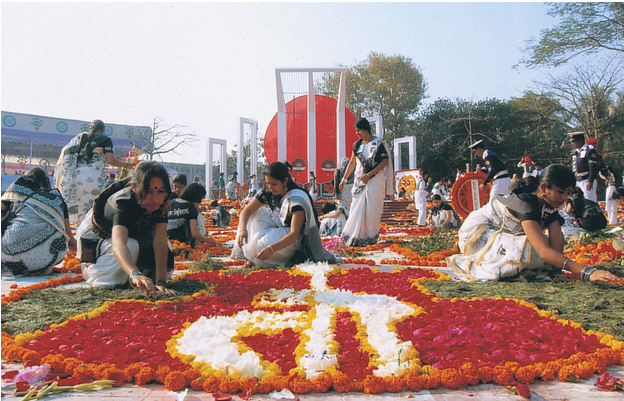
Shaheed Minar, or the Martyr's monument, located near Dhaka Medical College commemorates those who died during the protests on 21 February 1952.

The Language Movement had a major cultural impact on Bengali society. It has inspired the development and celebration of the Bengali language, literature and culture. 21 February, celebrated as Language Movement Day or Shohid Dibosh (Martyrs' Day), is a major national holiday in Bangladesh. A month-long event called the Ekushey Book Fair is held every year to commemorate the movement. Ekushey Padak, one of the highest civilian awards in Bangladesh, is awarded annually in memory of the sacrifices of the movement. Songs such as Abdul Gaffar Choudhury's Ekusher Gaan, set to music by Shaheed Altaf Mahmud, as well as plays, works of art and poetry played a considerable role in rousing the people's emotions during the movement. Since the events of February 1952, poems, songs, novels, plays, films, cartoons, and paintings were created to capture the movement from the varied point of views. Notable artistic depictions include the poems Bornomala, Amar Dukhini Bornomala and February 1969 by Shamsur Rahman, the film Jibon Theke Neya by Zahir Raihan, the stage play Kobor by Munier Chowdhury and the novels Ekushey February by Raihan and Artonaad by Shawkat Osman.

Two years after the first monument was destroyed by the police, a new Shaheed Minar (Monument of Martyrs) was constructed in 1954 to commemorate the protesters who died. Work on a larger monument designed by the architect Hamidur Rahman began in 1957 with the support of the United Front ministry, and was approved by a planning committee chaired by University of Dhaka Vice-Chancellor Mahmud Husain and College of Fine Arts principal Zainul Abedin. Hamidur Rahman's model consisted of a large complex in the yard of the Dhaka Medical College Hostel. The design included a half-circular column symbolising a mother with her martyred sons standing at the dais in the centre of the monument. Although the imposition of martial law in 1958 interrupted the work, the monument was completed and inaugurated on 21 February 1963 by Abul Barkat's mother, Hasina Begum. Pakistani forces demolished the monument during the Bangladesh Liberation War of 1971, but the Bangladeshi government reconstructed it in 1973. Ekushey Television, one of the oldest privately owned television channels in Bangladesh, was named after the date of the event.

=== India ===
Apart from Bangladesh, there was also a movement in the Indian state of Assam to give equal status to the Bengali language. On May 19, 1961, at Silchar railway station, 11 Bengalis were martyred by police firing while demanding the recognition of Bengali as a state language. Later, Bengali was granted the status of a semi-official language in three districts of Assam where the Bengali-speaking population is predominant. The states of West Bengal and Tripura in India celebrate 21 February as Language Movement Day.

=== Worldwide: International Mother Language Day ===
Bangladesh officially sent a proposal to UNESCO to declare 21 February as International Mother Language Day. The proposal was supported unanimously at the 30th General Conference of UNESCO held on 17 November 1999.

== See also ==
Quotations related to Bengali language movement at Wikiquote

- Bengali language activists
- Bengali Language Movement (Barak Valley)
- Bengali Language Movement (Manbhum)
- Tamaddun Majlish
- Women in the Bengali language movement
