= Rafiq Uddin Ahmed =

Poet and activist from Bangladesh

- রফিক উদ্দিন আহমেদ
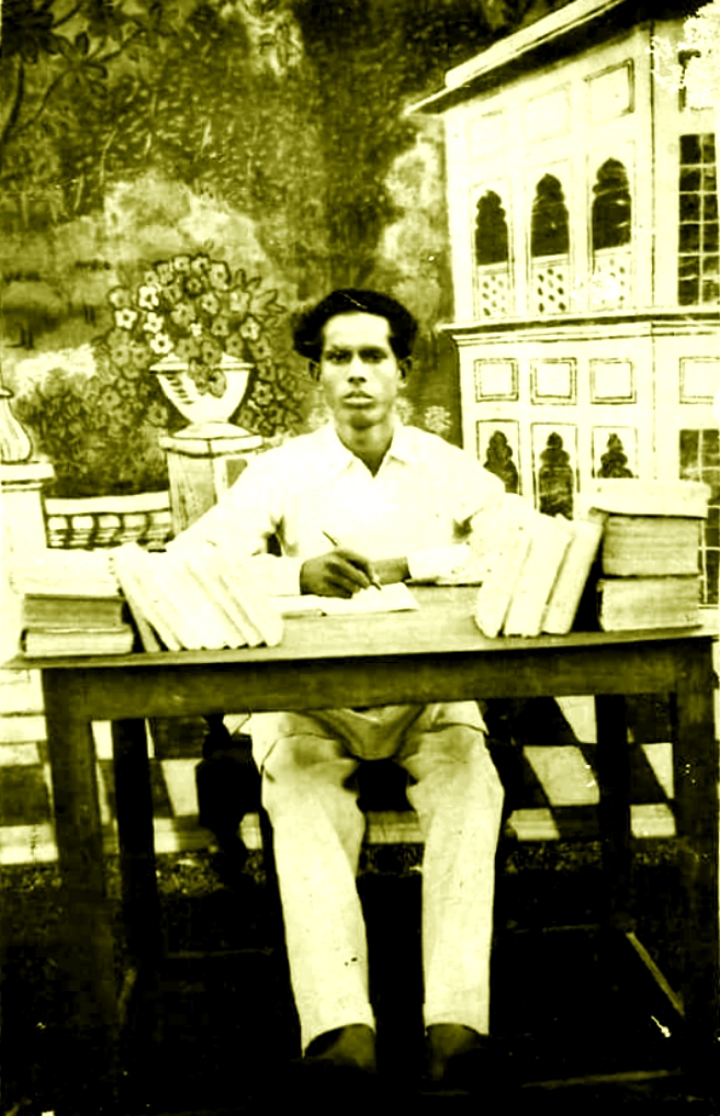
- Language Martyr, Rafiq Uddin Ahmed
- Pronunciation: Raphika Uddina Āhamēda
- Born: 30 October 1926; Singair, Bengal Presidency, British India
- Died: 21 February 1952 (aged 25); Dacca, East Bengal, Pakistan
- Monuments: Memorial Museum
- Awards: Ekushey Padak

Rafiq Uddin Ahmed (Bengali: রফিক উদ্দিন আহমদ) (30 October 1926 – 21 February 1952) was a protester killed during the Bengali language movement that took place in East Pakistan (currently Bangladesh) in 1952. He is considered a martyr in Bangladesh.

== Early life ==
Ahmed was born October 30, 1926, in Paril village (renamed 'Rafiqnagar'), Singair, Manikganj District, East Bengal, British Raj. His father's name was Abdul Latif, and his mother's name was Rafiza Khatun. Rafiq was the eldest son of the couple's five sons and two daughters. Rafiq's paternal grandfather is Mohammad Makhimul Alam. He passed his matriculation from Baira School in 1949. He studied the Intermediate level at Debendra College but dropped out before finishing. He moved to Dhaka and started working in a printing press owned by his father. In Dhaka, he was admitted to the Department of Accounting Science at the then Jagannath College.

== Bengali Language Movement ==
Ahmed was active in the student protest demanding Bengali be made the national language of Pakistan on 21 February 1952, despite Section 144 (curfew) at Dhaka University. When police opened fire at the demonstration in front of Dhaka Medical College premises, Rafiq was shot in the head and died immediately. His body was found on the east side of Room 5 of the medical hostel. Six to seven agitators found his body on the porch behind the Anatomy Hall. He was buried at Azimpur Graveyard under guard of the Pakistan Army. His grave, though, was lost and could not be identified later.

== Legacy ==
He was awarded Ekushey Padak posthumously in the year 2000 for his sacrifice. His village has been renamed from Paril to Rafiqnagar, and Bhasha Shaheed Rafiq Uddin Ahmad Library and Memorial Museum was created in his village in February 2010. The museum in memoriam of Rafiq was erected as a testament to the patriotism and courage he displayed as a martyr of the movement. The museum is quite empty and does not house many significant artifacts or memorabilia. Shaheed Rafiq Smriti Pathagar is a library in Manikganj named after him and was established in 2004. "Chander Moto Chandro Bindu" is a play based on his memoirs.
