= Abdul Jabbar (activist) =

Bengali language movement protester (1919–1952)

- আব্দুল জব্বার
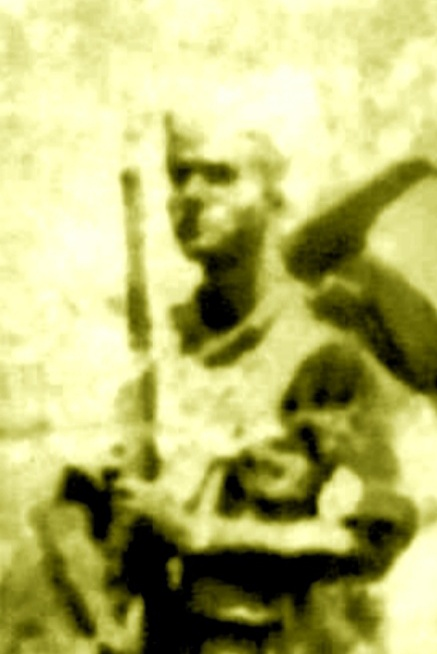
- Language martyr Abdul Jabbar
- Born: 11 October 1919; Mymensingh, Bengal Presidency, British India
- Died: 21 February 1952 (aged 32); Dacca, East Bengal, Pakistan
- Education: Dhopaghat Krishtobazar Primary School
- Known for: Demonstrator killed during Bengali language movement
- Spouse: Amina Khatun (m. 1949)
- Children: 1
- Awards: Ekushey Padak (2000)
- Police career
- Allegiance: Pakistan
- Branch: East Pakistan Ansar
- Service years: 1949 — 1952

Abdul Jabbar (11 October 1919 – 21 February 1952) was a Bengali protester who was killed during the Bengali language movement in 1952 that took place in what was then East Pakistan. He is considered a martyr in Bangladesh.

== Background ==
Abdul Jabbar was born on 11 October 1919 in Pachua under the Gaffargaon, Mymensingh, East Bengal, British Raj. Although he received his primary education in the local educational institution called pathsala (Dhopaghat Krishtobazar Primary School), he failed to continue his education owing to poverty.

== Career ==
Abdul Jabbar worked with his father farming in his village. He decided to travel to the river port town of Narayanganj by train. He got a job in Burma through an Englishman he met in Narayanganj. He worked there for 12 years before going back to Burma. He was recruited in the British Indian Navy during World War Two but was discharged after being injured during training. He was then working as a tailor. He came to Dhaka, East Pakistan in 1952 with his wife for the medical treatment of his mother-in-law in Dhaka Medical College Hospital. In 1949, he joined the Bangladesh Ansar, a paramilitary force of Bangladesh (the then East Pakistan).

== Personal life ==
In 1949, Abdul Jabbar married Amina Khatun, one of his friends' sister and settled down. One and a half year after the marriage, Amina had a baby boy, who was named Nurul Islam Badol.

== Events ==
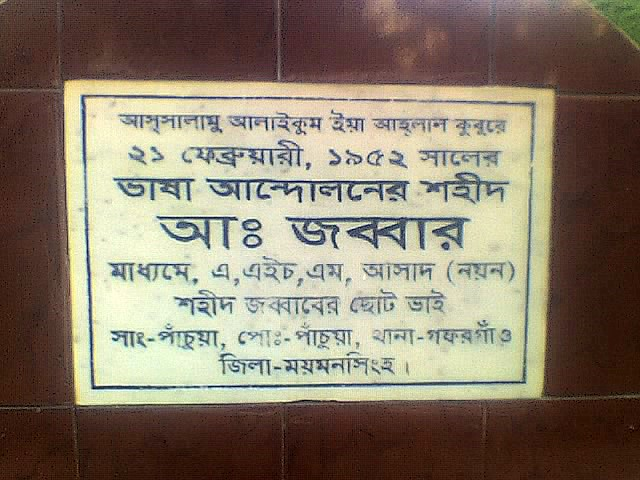
Epitaph on Abdul Jabbar's grave in Azimpur Graveyard (2007).

On 21 February 1952 the students in Dhaka bought a procession demanding Bengali be made a state language defying the Section 144 (curfew) imposed by the police. Abdul Jabbar joined the rally when it reached Dhaka Medical college. Police fired on the rally, injuring Abdul Jabbar. He was admitted to Dhaka Medical College where he died.

== Legacy ==
The government of Bangladesh awarded Abdul Jabbar the Ekushey Padak in 2000. The Bhasa Shaheed Abdul Jabbar Ansar-VDP School & College school operated by Ansar and Village Defense Party in named after him. Shaheed Rafiq-Jabbar Hall, a dorm of Jahangirnagar University is also named after him and fellow language activist Rafiq Uddin Ahmed.

== Gallery ==
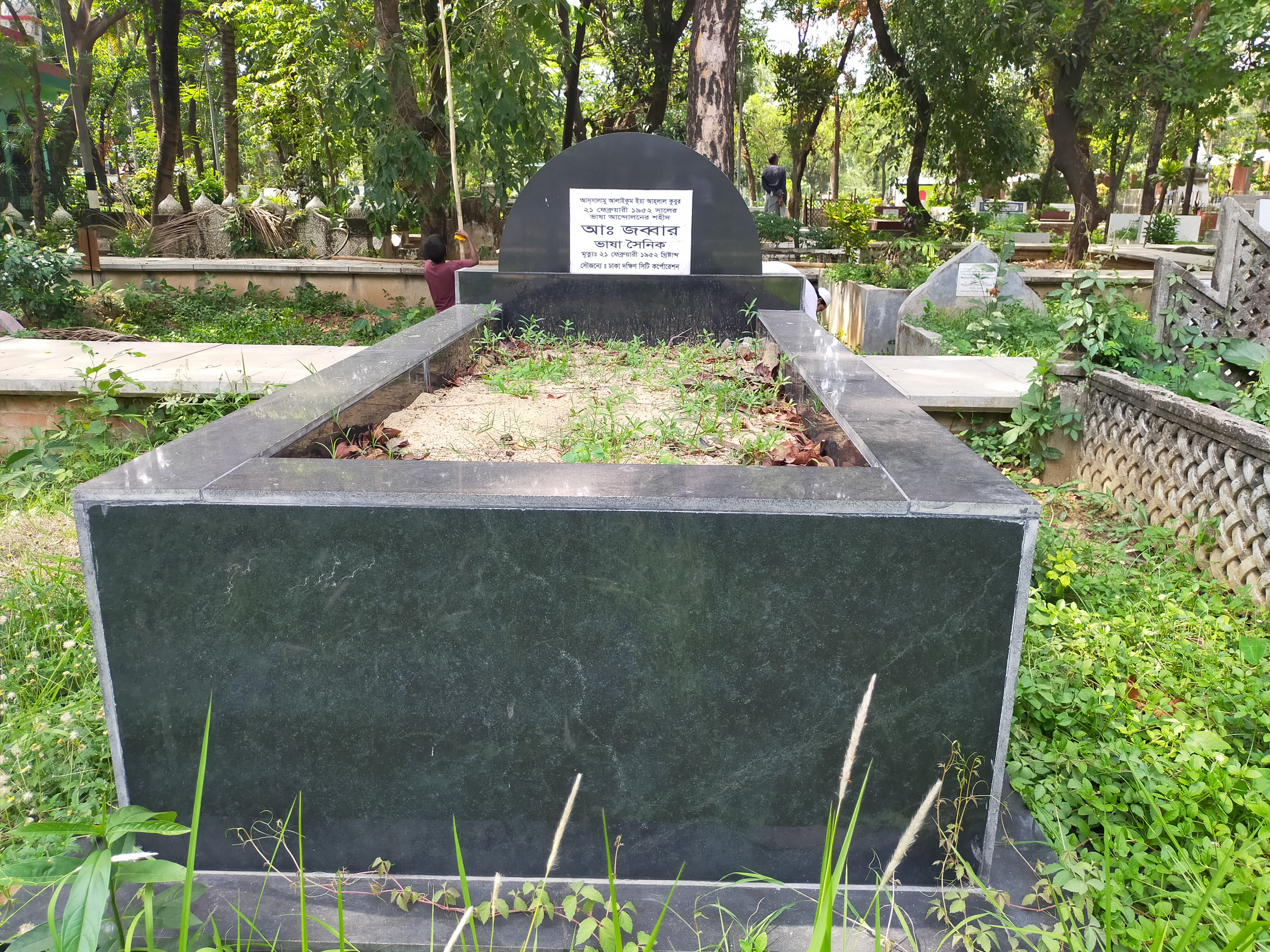
Grave of Abdul Jabbar (1919 – 1952) Language martyr at Azimpur graveyard, Dhaka.
