= Minority United Front =

Pakistani electoral alliance

The Minority United Front was an electoral alliance formed ahead of the 1954 East Bengal Legislative Assembly election. It consisted of the Pakistan Gana Samiti, the Pakistan Socialist Party and the Abhay Ashram. The Minority United Front contested 19 seats, in both the Caste Hindu and Scheduled Caste constituencies.

There had been talks on electoral arrangement between the Minority United Front and PNC, but that did not materialize in any pre-poll pact and the two groups were the main competitors for the Caste Hindu seats. There were also attempts to form an alliance between the Minority United Front and the Rasaraj Mandal-led faction of the East Bengal Scheduled Castes Federation, but in the end the Mandal-led group contested on their own.

The Minority United Front won 10 seats in the Assembly. Out of the three Pakistan Socialist Party candidates that had been fielded by the Minority Unity Front as candidates, all were elected - Trailokyanath Chakravarty, Pulin De and Deben Ghosh.
