= Abdul Momen =

Bengali civil servant and politician (1876–1946)

Khan Bahadur Abdul Momen
- Born: 24 June 1876; Kashiara, Burdwan district, Bengal Presidency
- Died: 18 June 1946 (aged 69)
- Education: Presidency College Calcutta
- Political party: Nikhil Banga Praja Samiti
- Parent: Nawab Abdul Jabbar (father)
- Relatives: Abul Kasem (cousin); Abul Hashim (nephew); Badruddin Umar (grandnephew)
- Awards: Khan Bahadur, Companion of the Order of the Indian Empire

Abdul Momen (24 June 1876 – 18 June 1946) was a Bengali civil servant and politician. He was the chief settlement officer of the Survey and Settlement Operation.

== Early life and career ==
Abdul Momen was born on 24 June 1876 to a Bengali family of Muslim zamindars in the village of Kashiara in Burdwan district, Bengal Presidency. He was the second son of aristocrat Nawab Abdul Jabbar and grandson of Chief Sadar Amin Khan Bahadur Ghulam Asghar.

He graduated with a Bachelor of Arts degree from Presidency College Calcutta in 1896.

== Career ==
Abdul Momen joined the Bengal Civil Service as a Sub-Deputy Collector in 1897. He was promoted to Deputy Collector in 1906. He was the Divisional Commissioner of Chittagong at the time of the Chittagong armoury raid.

He played an important role in the reform of the education system of contemporary Muslims. After his retirement, he was appointed Chairman of the Calcutta Improvement Trust. In 1931, he was appointed Chairman of the Muslim Education Commission Committee (popularly known as the Momen Committee). Members included his nephew Abul Kasem, Khan Bahadur Sir Muhammad Azizul Haque, Maulvi Tamizuddin Khan, and Khan Bahadur Afazuddin Ahmad.

Abdul Momen was a supporter of the reform and legalization of the Waqf system. Through his efforts, the Waqf Act was enacted in 1934 and the Bengal Waqf Board was established in 1936. He was one of the earliest Muslim insurance entrepreneurs. He played an active role in the formation of funds for Aryasthan Insurance Company.

He was interested in the land system of Bengal and was an expert on the subject. Because of his knowledge, he was appointed as the Chief Officer of Survey and Settlement of Jessore district. Until 1947, the position of Settlement Officer was reserved for the British, but there were exceptions. In his Final Report on Survey and Settlement Operations in the Jessore District 1920–1924, he made significant contributions to the land tenure and financial affairs of the district. His survey included land tenure, intermediate tenants, the rights and status of raiyats, markets, population, and the financial system of all classes.

When the All-Bengal Praja Samiti was founded in 1929, he was among the five vice-presidents.

== Awards ==
The British Raj conferred upon him the title of Khan Bahadur and awarded him as a Companion of the Order of the Indian Empire.

== Death ==
He died on 18 June 1946.
