= Bhabani =

Bhabani is a surname and a given name. Notable people with the name include:

- Bhabani Charan Bandyopadhyay (1787–1848), Indian journalist, author and an orator
- Adhuna Bhabani (born 1967), English hair stylist, co-host of BBLUNT
- Rani Bhabani (1716–1803), aka Ardhabangeshwari, Hindu zamindar in what is now Rajshahi, Bangladesh
- Bhabani Bhattacharya (1906–1988), Indian writer of Bengali origin, who wrote social-realist fiction
- Bhabani Prasad Bhattacharya (1914–1935), Indian revolutionary and member of the Bengal Volunteers
- Bhabani Shankar Bhoi, Indian politician & deputy speaker of Odisha assembly
- Bhabani Prasad Mandal, Indian theoretical physicist, professor at the Banaras Hindu University
- Bhabani Charan Pattanayak (1922–2020), Indian politician and independence activist
- Bhabani Prasad Singha (born 1953), Bangladeshi justice of the High Court Division

== See also ==
- Durga Bhabani, village development committee in Baitadi District in the Mahakali Zone of western Nepal
- Palace of Queen Bhabani of others Mamori or Natore Rajbari, a royal palace in Natore, Bangladesh
- Madhupur Rani Bhabani Model High School, a high school in Madhupur Upazila, Tangail, Dhaka, Bangladesh
