= East Pakistan Communist Party (Marxist–Leninist) =

Communist party

East Pakistan Communist Party (Marxist–Leninist) was a communist party in the erstwhile East Pakistan. The party emerged in 1966, after a split in the Communist Party of East Pakistan. Sukhendu Dastidar became the general secretary of EPCP(M-L).

== Bangladesh Liberation War and aftermath ==
During the Bangladesh Liberation War, Mohammad Toaha organised an armed guerrilla force composed of members of the Purbo Banglar Communist Party and operated a liberated zone in western Noakhali, thereby actively supporting the independence struggle. Abdul Haque, in contrast, adhered to a pacifist position and did not participate in the armed conflict. After the war two separate EPCP(M-L)s were formed, one led by Toaha's EPCP(M-L) which evolved into the Communist Party of Bangladesh (Marxist–Leninist) and the other led by Haque. Toaha's party denounced Charu Majumdar's ideology of class annihilation.

In 1978 Haque's party took the name Revolutionary Communist Party of Bangladesh (Marxist-Leninist).
