= 1954 East Bengal Legislative Assembly election =

First provincial legislative assembly election of East Bengal in Pakistan

- 8–12 March 1954

All 309 seats in the East Bengal Legislative Assembly 156 seats needed for a majority
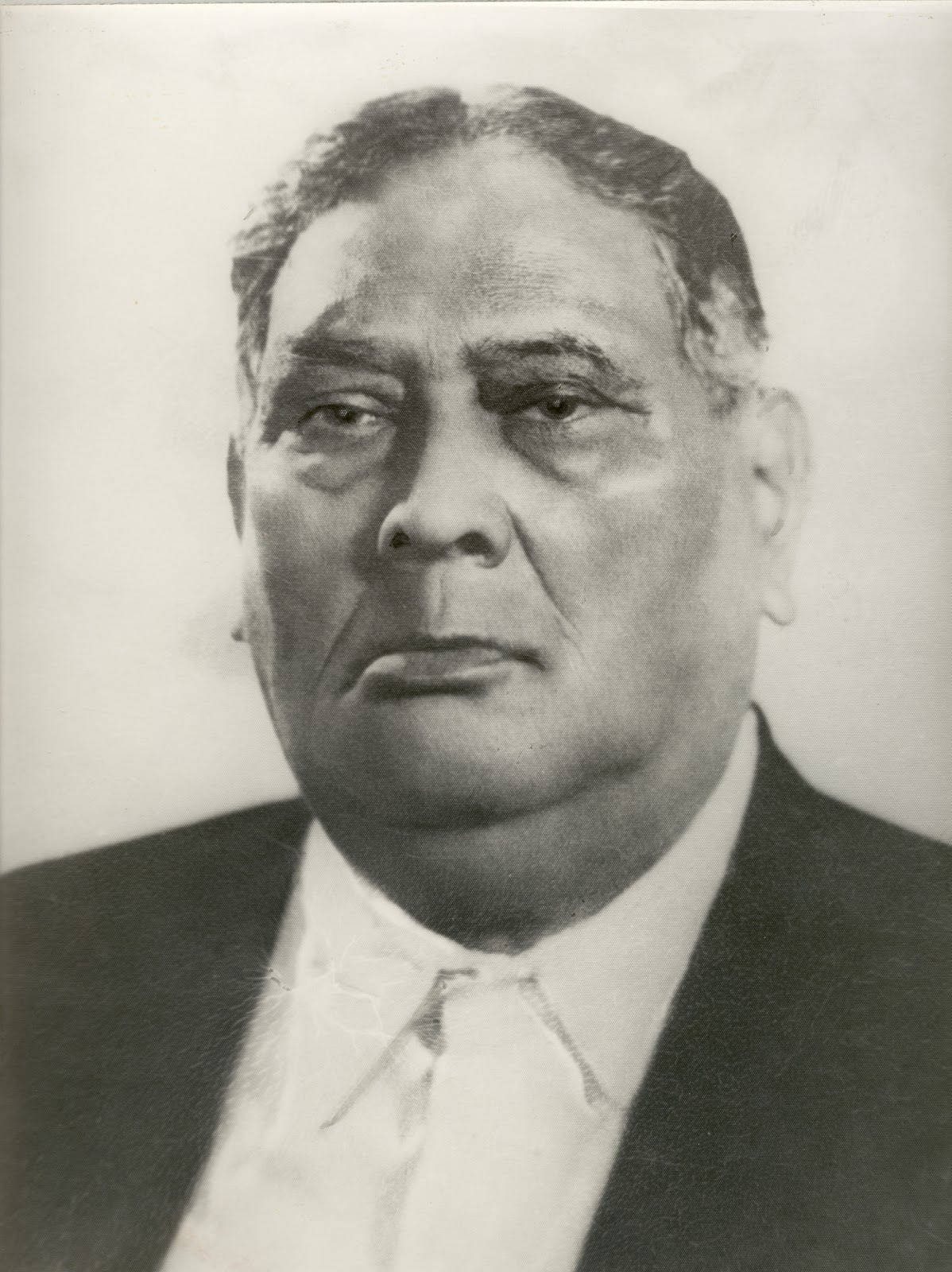

	First party	Second party
Leader	A. K. Fazlul Huq	Rasaraj Mandal
Party	UF	SCF
Seats won	223	27
	Third party	Fourth party
Leader	Basanta Kumar Das	Nurul Amin
Party	PNC	PML
Seats won	24	9
Prime Minister before election
Nurul Amin
PML
Elected Prime Minister
A. K. Fazlul Huq
UF

Legislative elections were held in East Bengal between 8 and 12 March 1954, the first since Pakistan became an independent country in 1947. The opposition United Front, led by the Awami Muslim League and Krishak Sramik Party, won a landslide victory with 223 of the 309 seats. The Muslim League Chief Minister of East Pakistan, Nurul Amin, was defeated in his own constituency by Khaleque Nawaz Khan by over 7,000 votes, with all the Muslim League ministers losing their seats.

== Background ==
The Bengal Legislative Assembly had been elected as part of the provincial elections in 1946 in British Bengal. Following the partition of Bengal, the East Bengal Legislative Assembly was created, consisting of all Muslim members and some Hindu members of the former Assembly, alongside members representing Sylhet in the Assam Legislative Assembly (as the region had voted to join Pakistan). Due to delays in implementing the constitution of Pakistan, its term was extended several times, with around 34 seats (reserved for Hindus living in East Bengal) left vacant as the Hindu members elected from East Bengal in 1946 had migrated to West Bengal (where they became the members of the West Bengal Legislative Assembly) to escape the communal riots unleashed by the partition and the 1950 East Pakistan riots, with by-elections not held by the Pakistani administration to replace them.

Muslim League was the de facto political party in East Bengal before the partition of India and won the 1946 Bengal Legislative Assembly election. It paved the way for them in succeeding the Pakistan movement which led to the creation of Pakistan. During the movement, the Muslim majority of East Bengal came under one political umbrella of the Muslim League in favor of an independent Muslim majority state. In order to achieve this solitary goal of Pakistan, they have avoided any other internal issues between them and promised themselves to mitigate the concerns after the partition. But after independence, several unsatisfied factions inside Muslim League have found their issues neglected by the central leaders. As a result, many leaders of Muslim League who demanded internal changes in the party supported independent candidate Shamsul Huq in the Tangail South by-election against the party nominee Khurram Khan Panni. Shamsul Huq's victory in that election and the subsequent cancellation of the result encouraged him along with other leaders like Maulana Bhashani to form Awami Muslim League in June 1949.

The executive leaders of the Muslim League focused more on their feudal interest instead of fulfilling the demand of the common people. Their popularity took a serious blow when president of the provincial party and the Chief minster of East Bengal Nurul Amin tried to suppress Bengali language movement in the form of violence. Even though some of the executive roles of the party were occupied by the leaders born in East Bengal, these leaders were unable to reflect the socio-economic needs of the eastern part of Pakistan. Unemployment and communal conflicts have exposed the existing leadership's inexperience and lack of clear policies in governing a new state. The Muslim League was also accused of not contemplating on the proposals of their own party members and thus failed to stop them from forming new political identities.

== Electoral system ==
Under the Government of India Act of 1935, which was the main law of the Dominion of Pakistan until the constitution of Pakistan came into effect in 1956, the East Bengal Legislative Assembly consisted of 309 seats, of which 228 were reserved for Muslims, 36 for scheduled castes, 12 for women (nine Muslims, one Hindu, and two scheduled castes), two for Buddhists, and one for Christians. There were also 30 'general' seats for Hindus.

A total of 19,541,563 voters were registered for the elections, of which 9,239,720 were women. Of the total voters, 15,159,825 were able to vote in the Muslim seats, 2,303,578 in the scheduled caste seats, 2,095,355 in the Hindu seats, 136,417 in the Buddhist seats, and 43,911 for the Christian seat.

== Campaign ==
The Muslim League published its manifesto on 13 December 1953, calling for Bengali to be made an official state language, reform in agriculture and education, and improvements in healthcare, and began its campaign in January 1954. The Awami Muslim League published a 41-point manifesto focusing on autonomy, political reform, and nationalisation. The Communists published a 22-point manifesto on 2 December, calling for them to be the leading party in a united front against the Muslim League, as well as promoting autonomy and the recognition of Bengali.

Several opposition parties called for the creation of an opposition front, with agreement reached between the Awami Muslim League and the Krishak Sramik Party on 4 December. The Front was later joined by the Nizam-e-Islam Party and Ganatantri Dal.

A total of 1,285 candidates contested the elections: 986 for the 228 Muslim seats, 151 for the 36 scheduled caste seats, 103 for the 30 Hindu seats, 37 for the women's seats, and 12 for the two Buddhist seats. The Christian seat had only one candidate, as did the Hindu women's seat and one of the scheduled caste seats. Two Hindu seats also had one candidate who was returned unopposed. The Muslim League and United Front ran candidates in all 237 Muslim seats.

== Results ==
The results were conclusive; with 7,344,216 votes being cast, voter turnout was around 37%, with Muslim turnout being around 38% and non-Muslim turnout around 35%. Various causes for such a low output have been suggested, including disenfranchisement of Muslim women by their conservative male family members and poor infrastructure and communications in rural areas. The United Front won 223 of the 237 Muslim seats in the provincial assembly and obtained nearly 64% of the vote. In contrast, the Muslim League won only nine seats and secured less than 27% of the vote in the contested constituencies. Among the most exciting aspects of the election was the defeat of several ministers, including Nurul Amin, the Muslim League Chief Minister. A. K. Fazlul Huq was elected in two constituencies, forcing a by-election in one of them. The Khilafat-i-Rabbani Party of AKM Rafiq Ullah Choudhury, which had also participated in the Bengali language movement, won one Muslim seat.

The East Bengal Scheduled Castes Federation (the East Bengal unit of the SCF founded by B. R. Ambedkar) won the most seats reserved for scheduled castes, while the Pakistan National Congress (the Pakistani unit of the Indian National Congress) won the most Hindu seats. The Minority United Front, consisting of Pakistan Gana Samiti, Pakistan Socialist Party, and Abhay Ashram, contested both scheduled caste and Hindu seats. The Communist Party of Pakistan won four Hindu seats but failed to win any Muslim seats.

The Ganatantri Dal was the only party to win both Hindu and Muslim seats.

Party or alliance		Votes	%	Seats
United Front	All-Pakistan Awami League (Awami Muslim League)			143
United Front	Krishak Sramik Party			48
United Front	Nizam-e-Islam Party			19
United Front	Ganatantri Dal			13
Muslim League				9
Khilafat-i-Rabbani Party				1
Independents				4
Muslim seats		5,760,179	78.43	237
Scheduled Caste Federation				27
Pakistan National Congress				24
Minority United Front				10
Communist Party				4
Ganatantri Dal				3
Buddhists				2
Christian				1
Independent Hindu				1
Non-Muslim seats		1,584,037	21.57	72
Total		7,344,216	100.00	309
Total votes		7,344,216	–	
Registered voters/turnout		19,541,563	37.58	
Source: Nair

=== Cabinet ===
Members of the newly elected Legislative Assembly were sworn in on 25 March 1954. The United Front cabinet was initially sworn in on 3 April 1954, with the fully expanded cabinet sworn in on 15 May 1954 under the leadership of Sher-e-Bangla A. K. Fazlul Huq.

Portfolio	Minister	Took office	Left office	Party	Ref
Chief Minister	Sher-e-Bangla; Abul Kasem Fazlul Huq	3 April 1954	29 May 1954	KSP	
Minister of Civil Supplies	Ataur Rahman Khan	15 May 1954	29 May 1954	AL	
Minister of Finance	Abu Hussain Sarkar	15 May 1954	29 May 1954	KSP	
Minister of Law and Justice	Kafiluddin Chowdhury	15 May 1954	29 May 1954	KSP	
Minister of Public Health	Abul Mansur Ahmad	15 May 1954	29 May 1954	AL	
Minister of Education	Syed Azizul Huq	15 May 1954	29 May 1954	KSP	
Minister of Industries and Labour	Abdus Salam Khan	15 May 1954	29 May 1954	AL	
Minister of Rural Development and Co-operatives	Sheikh Mujibur Rahman	15 May 1954	29 May 1954	AL	
Minister of Revenue and Land Reform	Abdul Latif Biswas	15 May 1954	29 May 1954		
Minister of State Acquisition	Moazzam Uddin Hussain	15 May 1954	29 May 1954		
Minister of Commerce and Power Development	Hamid Uddin	15 May 1954	29 May 1954		
Minister of Agriculture, Forest and Jute	Yusuf Ali Chowdhury	15 May 1954	29 May 1954	KSP	
Minister of Medical and Jail	Razzaqul Haider Chowdhury	15 May 1954	29 May 1954	KSP	
Minister of Roads and Housing	Ashrafuddin Chowdhury	15 May 1954	29 May 1954	NIP	

== Aftermath ==
Following the elections, independent Assembly member Fazlal Qadir Chowdhury joined the Muslim League to give them ten seats, allowing the party to form a parliamentary group.

On 15 May 1954, when Haq expanded the cabinet to include members of the Awami League, deadly clashes broke out between the Bengali-speaking Bengali Muslim and Urdu-speaking Bihari Muslim labourers at the Adamjee Jute Mills, leaving around 1,500 dead. The Communist Party of Pakistan was blamed for inciting the violence. On 30 May, Haq was put under house arrest, the United Front ministry and the Legislative Assembly were dissolved, and East Bengal was put under governor's rule by Governor-General Malik Ghulam Muhammad. 1,600 United Front workers, including 30 MLAs, were imprisoned on charges of fomenting dissent.

== Legacy ==
The defeat of the Muslim League created an idiom in the Bengali language, "Hate Hariken Dhoriye Deya" (Bengali: হাতে হারিকেন ধরিয়ে দেয়া, lit. 'Hand over the lantern') as the party's election symbol was the lantern (hariken in Bengali).

Soon after the dissolution of the Legislative Assembly, the Pakistani government implemented its One Unit Scheme, under which East Bengal became East Pakistan. This move was not supported by the masses and increased hostility towards the Punjabi-dominated central government. The United Front promoted the idea of regional autonomy, which eventually led to the independence of Bangladesh.

== Bibliography ==
- Nair, M Bhaskaran (1990). Politics in Bangladesh: A Study of Awami League, 1949-58 (PDF). India: Northern Book Centre (New Delhi). ISBN 81-85119-79-1.
- Ghosh, Shyamali (2007). আওয়ামী লীগ: ১৯৪৯-১৯৭১ [AWAMI LEAGUE 1949-1971] (in Bengali). Bangladesh: The University Press Limited. ISBN 9840502840.
