= Pakistan Gana Samiti =

The Pakistan Gana Samiti (Bengali language for 'Pakistan People's Association', abbreviated PGS) was a political party in Pakistan.

The PGS was formed by a minority section of the erstwhile Indian National Congress in East Bengal at an 'Eastern Pakistan Political Convention' in Comilla on July 18, 1948. The founders of PGS included Kamini Kumar Dutta (Member of the Constituent Assembly of Pakistan), Dhirendra Nath Dutta (Member of the Constituent Assembly of Pakistan, Member of the East Bengal Legislative Assembly) and Prabhas Chandra Lahiri (Member of the East Bengal Legislative Assembly). Dhirenda Nath Dutta was the founding general secretary of PGS. In April 1948 the All India Congress Committee had declared the Indian National Congress membership restricted to India alone, effectively expelling the Congressmen in Pakistan from the party. The majority wing in Pakistan reluctantly formed a new party, the Pakistan National Congress (PNC), in August 1948. But the group forming the PGS opposed reviving the Congress party in Pakistan, rather preferring founding a new Pakistani party with a new identity. Among the attendees at the Comilla convention there were reportedly members of the Pakistan Socialist Party, the Revolutionary Socialist Party and the Forward Bloc.

The Comilla convention declared PGS as a party open to all citizens regardless of religion or caste. The PGS sought to build alliances with the Muslim majority polity in East Bengal, championing Bengali causes in at the Pakistan centre and East Bengal provincial levels. PGS campaigned for joint electorate in East Bengal. The party was mainly based in Comilla, with some presence in Dacca. It had a weak party organization.

However there was still some overlap between PGS and PNC, as PGS maintained close relations with some sectors of PNC. For example Dhirendra Nath Dutta simultaneously served as the PGS general secretary as well as being the Deputy Leader of the Congress Parliamentary Party in the Constituent Assembly.

PGS contested the 1954 East Bengal Legislative Assembly election under the banner of the Minority United Front, an electoral alliance formed together with the Pakistan Socialist Party and the Abhay Ashram. The Minority United Front contested 19 seats, in both the Caste Hindu and Scheduled Caste constituencies. There were talks on electoral arrangement between the Minority United Front and PNC, but that did not materialize in any pre-poll pact and the two groups were the main competitors for the Caste Hindu seats. There were also attempts to form an alliance between the Minority United Front and the Rasaraj Mandal-led faction of the East Bengal Scheduled Castes Federation, but in the end the Mandal-led group contested on their own. The Minority United Front won 10 seats in the Assembly. After the election the PGS leaders set up the United Progressive Party (UPP) as a new legislative faction. The UPP replaced the PGS. The UPP was joined by some socialist Congressmen, and sections of the Forward Bloc and the Pakistan Socialist Party (led by Trailokyanath Chakravarty).
