= Rajshahi Central Jail =

Major prison in Rajshahi, Bangladesh

- Interactive map of Rajshahi Central Jail
- Location: Rajshahi, Rajshahi District; 24.366424°N 88.584340°E
- Status: Operational
- Security class: Maximum
- Capacity: 1460
- Population: ~3500 (18 Nov 2023)
- Opened: 1840
- Managed by: Bangladesh Jail
- Warden: MD. Shah Alam
- Website: prison.rajshahi.gov.bd

Rajshahi Central Jail (Bengali: রাজশাহী কেন্দ্রীয় কারাগার) is a prison in Rajshahi Division, Bangladesh. It is located on the northern bank of the Padma River in Rajshahi District.

== History ==
Rajshahi Jail was established in 1840 by the British colonial administration. In 1914, during the British colonial period, it was upgraded to a central jail. On 24 April 1950, the district police opened fire in the Khapra Ward of the jail after prisoners launched a hunger strike and protest against poor-quality food and mistreatment. Several active members of the Communist Party were killed in the incident, which is widely known as the Khapra Ward Massacre. Various left‑wing organizations in Bangladesh observe 24 April to commemorate the event.

== Infrastructure and capacity ==
Rajshahi Central Jail is situated on 54.9610 acres of land. It has an official capacity of 1,460 inmates, although, on average, around 3,500 detainees and convicts are held there. The facility includes a hospital, a mosque, and a prison training academy. In addition, there are multiple cell blocks for inmates and separate buildings for prison guards and administrative officers.

== Notable prisoners ==
- Abdul Haque - Bangladeshi communist politician and anti‑colonial activist
- Aminul Islam Badsha - Bangladeshi language movement activist and freedom fighter
- Anwar Hossain - Bengali revolutionary student leader
- Bhabani Prasad Bhattacharya - Bengali anti‑colonial revolutionary
- Ila Mitra - Bengali communist and peasant leader
- Kazi Abdus Shahid Lal - Bangladeshi left‑wing politician and freedom fighter
- Mohammad Toaha - Bangladeshi communist leader and freedom fighter
- Md Asaduzzaman Asad - Bangladeshi MP from Rajshahi‑3
- Mohsin Uddin Ahmed - Bangladeshi army officer
- Moni Singh - Bangladeshi communist leader and freedom fighter
- Mujibur Rahman (officer, born 1953) - Bangladeshi army officer
- Shahid Saber - Bengali journalist and political activist

== See also ==
- Chittagong Central Jail
- Dhaka Central Jail
