= Abdul Haque (politician, born 1920) =

Bangladeshi communist revolutionary and anti-colonial activist

- আবদুল হক
- Born: 23 December 1920; Kharki, Jessore, British India, (present-day Bangladesh)
- Died: 22 December 1995 (aged 74); Bangladesh
- Citizenship: British subject (Until 1947); Pakistan (Until 1971); Bangladesh
- Education: Master of Arts, Maulana Azad College, University of Calcutta
- Known for: Tebhaga Movement
- Political party: Communist Party of Bangladesh (Marxist–Leninist), Revolutionary Communist Party of Bangladesh (Marxist–Leninist)

Abdul Haque (Bengali: আবদুল হক; 23 December 1920 – 22 December 1995) was a Bengali armed revolutionary and communist politician. During the British Raj, he participated in the 1939 Holwell Monument agitation and the Tebhaga movement. In East Pakistan, he was directly involved in the 1950 Khapra Ward movement at Rajshahi Central Jail, as well as the 1969 East Pakistan mass uprising. Following the independence of Bangladesh in 1971, he took part in various communist revolutionary movements.

== Political career ==
=== Early political involvement ===
In 1941, Haque joined the Communist Party of India. While still a student, he served on the Bengal Provincial Committee of the All India Students' Federation, which operated under the party's political leadership. In 1967, he played a leading role in the establishment of the East Pakistan Communist Party (Marxist–Leninist).

=== Post-liberation politics ===
In early 1972, Haque remained active in the East Pakistan Communist Party (Marxist–Leninist), which experienced a major split. One faction was led by Mohammad Toaha, while Haque took leadership of another group. In 1978, his faction adopted the name Revolutionary Communist Party of Bangladesh (Marxist–Leninist).

== Published works ==
1. History's Verdict: Socialism
2. The Path to Liberation from Hunger
3. As Much Blood, As Many Dollars
4. East Bengal: Semi‑Colonial, Semi‑Feudal
5. Agricultural System: Semi‑Feudal
6. Marxist Philosophy
7. The Nature of Social Imperialism – I
8. The Nature of Social Imperialism – II
9. The Contemporary Economy of Bangladesh
10. An Evaluation of Mao Zedong
11. Collected Works of Comrade Abdul Haque
