= Pakistan Forward Bloc =

Former Pakistani political party

The Pakistan Forward Bloc was a political party in Pakistan.

By early 1948 there was debate within the All India Forward Bloc on how to deal with the new situation after the Partition of India, whether to retain one united party for both India and Pakistan or whether to split the party in two. A party conference was held in Dacca. Then a council meeting was held in Bauria. These events were followed by a Working Committee meeting at Benares, which voted to move ahead with the split. There was discontent within the party regarding this decision, with party president Sardul Singh Kavishar declaring the decision illegal.

Samar Guha became the secretary of the Pakistan Forward Bloc. The Pakistan Forward Bloc aligned with the Pakistan Gana Samiti, and Guha became the secretary of the latter party before migrating to India in 1951. Along with the PGS and elements from the Pakistan Socialist Party, remnants of the Pakistan Forward Bloc joined the United Progressive Party in 1954.
