= Ujjwala Majumdar =

Indian revolutionary (1914–1992)

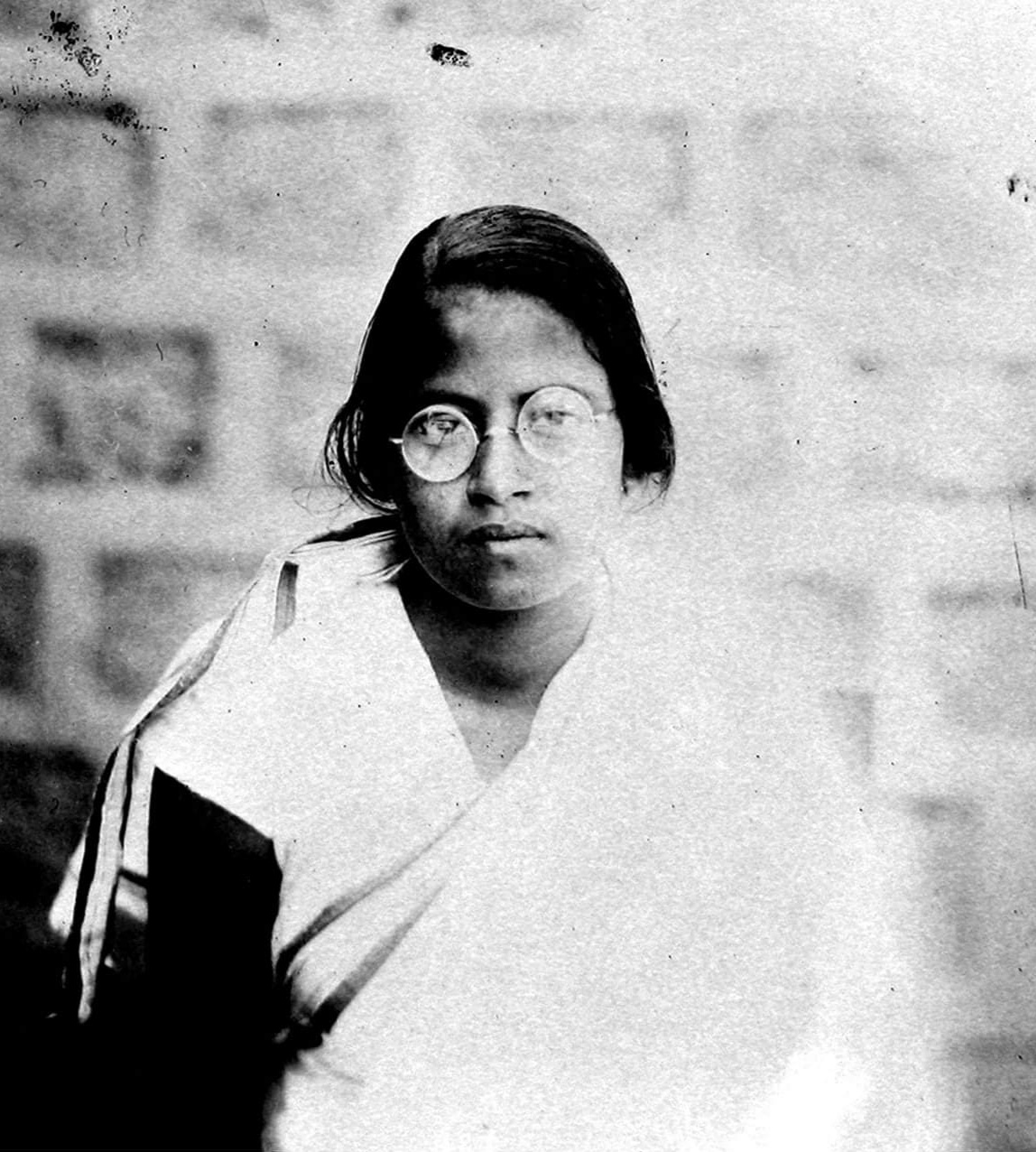
- Ujjawla Majumdar
- Born: 21 November 1914
- Died: 25 April 1992 (aged 77)
- Occupation: Indian revolutionary freedom fighter
- Known for: Aiding the Anti-British India movement

Ujjwala Majumdar (21 November 1914 – 25 April 1992) was an Indian revolutionary, far-left leader, and social activist.

== Early life ==
Ujjwala Majumdar was born in Dhaka, in what is now Bangladesh. Her father, Suresh Chandra Majumdar, was involved with Bengali revolutionaries. When she was 14 years old, Majumdar helped her father transport firearms from Calcutta by carrying them around her waist and delivering them to the revolutionary activists. She was mentored by Bengali activists like Sukumar Ghosh and Manoranjan Banerjee. As her schooling had started very late, Majumdar passed matriculation at the age of 20.

== Organization memberships ==
Majumdar joined the Bengal Volunteers at an early age. She later joined another pro-independence institution called Adipali Sangh, and another organization, Yugantar Dal, which strove for independence. She later became a leader of the Forward Bloc core team.

== Assassination attempt of John Anderson and imprisonment ==
Majumdar travelled to Darjeeling with Bhabani Prasad Bhattacharya, Sukunar Ghosh, Ravi Banerjee, and some other revolutionary activists to assassinate Governor John Anderson; she hid her weapon in a harmonium. She entered a hotel and posed as a married couple with Manoranjan Banerjee. On 6 May 1934, Bhattacharya shot the governor at the Darjeeling Lebong Racecourse, but only inflicted minor injuries. Bhattacharya was caught and later hanged. Majumdar and Manoranjan Banerjee fled to Calcutta in disguise and took refuge in Sovarani Datta's house. Police arrested them on 18 May 1934. Majumdar was sentenced to 14 years in prison by a special tribunal and sent to the Central Jail. She was released from Dhaka Jail in April 1939 at Mahatma Gandhi's plea. She joined the Quit India Movement in Calcutta in 1942, which resulted in her imprisonment again. She was released in 1947 after four years in the Presidency Correction Home.

== Social activities ==
Majumdar studied inside the jail and obtained a BA. After her release, she participated in various public welfare activities. She went to areas affected by the Noakhali riots and contributed to the relief work. Majumdar established an institution called Palli Niketan for the development of the deprived classes near Barasat. She was engaged in social work for several villages that lay under the jurisdiction of the Rajarhat police station. In 1947, she married Rakshita Roy, a revolutionary and literary figure of Bhupendra Kishore.
