= Khapra Ward Massacre =

Prison massacre in Rajshahi

- 24.366489°N 88.5843286°E
- Native name: খাপড়া ওয়ার্ড গণহত্যা
- Location: Rajshahi Central Jail, Rajshahi, East Bengal, Dominion of Pakistan, (Now in Bangladesh)
- Date: 24 April 1950
- Attack type: Murder
- Deaths: 7
- Injuries: 30
- Victim: Communist activists
- Perpetrator: Jail authorities

Khapra Ward Massacre (Bengali: খাপড়া ওয়ার্ড গণহত্যা) was a massacre that took place on 24 April 1950 in Rajshahi Central Jail (then in Pakistan, now in Bangladesh). In this incident, jail authorities opened fire on political prisoners, primarily Communist activists, killing seven prisoners and injuring about 30 others.

== Background ==
After the partition of India and the creation of Pakistan in 1947, the new state faced growing unrest among farmers, workers, and students who were influenced by communist and left‑wing ideas. In the late 1940s, Bengal became a center of peasant movements demanding fairer treatment and land reforms. The Tebhaga movement gained momentum during this period, led in the Rajshahi area by communist leader Ila Mitra, in the Mymensingh area by Moni Singh, and in the Jessore area by Abdul Haque. These uprisings soon spread across Bengal. Between 1948 and 1950, several of these movements turned violent, and the Pakistan government responded with harsh repression. Hundreds of leaders and activists were arrested as authorities tried to suppress the growing resistance.

During that time, prisoners were subjected to brutal treatment for many reasons. They were given very little food and were forced to do hard labor such as turning oil mills, threshing grain, and grinding wheat. If they delayed in their work or took even a short rest, they were severely tortured. The communist prisoners in Rajshahi Jail were the first to protest against such inhuman punishments. They began a hunger strike, which gradually spread to other jails as well. Between March and December 1949, prisoners in Dhaka and Rajshahi Jails went on hunger strike four times, totaling 150 days. In Khulna Jail, communist activist Bishnu Bairagi was beaten to death. In Dhaka Jail, on 8 December, Shiben Roy died when prison authorities tried to force‑feed him. Yet the authorities falsely claimed that both Shiben Roy and Bishnu Bairagi had committed suicide. In protest, the prisoners demanded an end to torture and insisted on proper food.

After hearing about the deaths of Bishnu Bairagi and Shiben Roy, tension spread among prisoners across East Bengal Province in January 1950. In many prisons, they staged scattered protests and demonstrations, which were met with severe repression. When the authorities saw that torture was not silencing them, they deliberately tried to create divisions among Hindu, Muslim, and other prisoners.

The political prisoners in Rajshahi Jail sent a memorandum to Chief Minister Nurul Amin demanding an end to torture and condemning the communal incitement. The letter contained detailed complaints against the guards and jail authorities and gave the Chief Minister 15 days to respond. No reply came within that time. On 5 April, the prisoners began another hunger strike, and soon the number of strikers exceeded a thousand. Eventually, news of the demands reached Amiruddin, the Inspector General of Prisons. When he visited Rajshahi, he asked both political and ordinary prisoners to stop the hunger strike, but the political prisoners refused. He then agreed to hold talks with them. The prisoners held an internal meeting and sent 12 representatives.

At the very start of the meeting, IG Amir Hossain questioned why political prisoners leading movements over the issues of ordinary inmates were. The meeting ended amid tension without any resolution, and the authorities still gave no assurance of accepting the demands. The hunger strike continued. At that time, following a “divide and rule” strategy, IG of Prisons Amir Hossain advised jail superintendent W. F. Bill that transferring some political prisoners would resolve the situation. However, none of the political prisoners agreed to leave Khapra Ward. According to the orders, communist prisoners were to be moved to Cell No. 14, which was reserved for death-row inmates, leprosy and tuberculosis patients, and where autopsies were conducted for prisoners who died in jail. The communist prisoners strongly opposed this decision.

After seven days without any progress, representatives of both political and ordinary prisoners were called to the jail gate and pressured to end the hunger strike. But the prisoners refused, insisting their demands be met first. In April, the IG of Prisons promised that the prisoners would no longer be physically abused and that they could buy tobacco with their own money. The IG gathered around 2,500 inmates in the jail’s playground and warned them that the communists were failing outside the jail and were now trying to incite trouble among the prisoners for their own benefit. He urged the inmates not to fall into the communists’ trap and bring harm to themselves. At the same time, Amir Hossain visited the political prisoners’ quarters to warn them that the unstable environment they were creating inside the jail in the name of revolution would soon lead to serious consequences.

== Event ==
On 24 April 1950, jail authorities attempted to transfer eight detainees from the Khapra Ward to the condemned cells meant for death‑row inmates. The political prisoners protested, citing their long‑standing demands: proper division facilities for political detainees, adequate food supplies, and an end to the practice of keeping eleven political prisoners confined together in the overcrowded Khapra Ward.

In the early morning, after the breakfast, the prisoners resumed talks at 9 a.m. During this time, Jail Superintendent W. F. Bill entered Khapra Ward and ordered the prisoners again to move to Cell No. 14. When Bill tried to leave after giving the order, prisoners Babar Ali, Delwar, and Rashid Uddin blocked his way. In response, Bill struck Babar Ali’s wrist with a hunting rifle, breaking it, and then blew a whistle. Immediately, about 40 prison guards surrounded Khapra Ward. Inside, the communist prisoners decided to lock the doors tightly, using coconut trunks, benches, mattresses, and all their strength to hold them shut. When the police started pushing against the doors from outside, they fired shots. Prisoner Prasad Roy was hit and collapsed to the floor as the police stormed inside. The sound of rifle fire and the prisoners’ cries filled the jail air. The prisoners’ resistance broke under the assault, and many were severely beaten with batons, writhing in pain. Panic spread throughout the jail. Six prisoners died on the spot, including Hanif Sheikh, a worker leader from Kushtia Mohini Mill, who was the first to be killed. As the silence fell, student leader Anwar from Khulna raised his head but was instantly shot in the head, his skull shattering near a coconut trunk.

Once the police regained control, Superintendent Bill entered the ward and, finding prisoner leader Abdul Haque, struck him on the head with the hard part of his hunting rifle. Abdul Haque fell unconscious, bleeding on the floor. Another group of police then began a sudden baton charge on the injured prisoners. In the midst of the brutal crackdown, one thirsty prisoner requested water, but the jail official Mannan Sipahi cruelly ordered another prisoner to urinate into his mouth.

Among the injured were Abdul Haque, whose left arm was shattered; Monsur Habib, hit in the knee and arm; and Nurunnabi Chowdhury, who had to have his leg amputated. Others, including Babar Ali, Aminul Islam, Bhupen Palit, and Amulya Lahiri, also suffered serious injuries.

=== Victims who were killed ===
- Anwar Hossain (1930 – 24 April 1950), student leader
- Bijon Sen (1905 – 24 April 1950), union leader
- Komparam Singh (1887 – 24 April 1950), leader of the Tebhaga movement
- Sudhin Dhar (1918 – 24 April 1950), organizer at Mohini Mill
- Hanif Sheikh (1924 – 24 April 1950), worker at Mohini Mill
- Dilwar Hossain (1926 – 24 April 1950), railway worker from Kushtia
- Sukhen Bhattacharya (1928 – 24 April 1950), student organizer from Mymensingh

== Aftermath ==
The bodies of all the victims in the Khapra Ward were secretly disposed of by the prison authorities and police, and none of their relatives were informed about the incident.

== Legacy ==
Every year on 24 April, the prison doors are opened to remember those who were killed. Political groups place floral wreaths in front of the ward to honor them.

== In popular culture ==
The Khapra Ward massacre is depicted in the Bangladeshi film Rupsha Nodir Banke (2020). Written and directed by Tanvir Mokammel, partly Bangladesh government‑funded biographical film narrates major events from 1930 to 1971 through the life of Manabratan Mukhopadhyay, an ill‑fated leftist leader. Among the historical incidents portrayed in the film are the Swadeshi movement, the Tebhaga movement, and the killing of seven leftists in Rajshahi District Jail.
