= Nachole Uprising =

Peasant uprising in Bangladesh

- Part of the Cold War
- Location of Nachole Upazila in Rajshahi Division.
Date	1949–1950
Location	Nachole Upazila, Chapai Nawabganj District, Rajshahi Division, East Bengal, Pakistan
Result	Uprising suppressed: East Bengal State Acquisition and Tenancy Act of 1950 passed

Belligerents
Local Jotedars; Dominion of Pakistan: (Pakistan) East Bengal	Santal peasants Communist activists

Commanders and leaders
Unknown	Ila Mitra (POW); Animesh Lahiri (POW); Ajhar Sheikh (POW); Brindanban Sabha (POW)

Units involved
East Bengal Police; Pakistan Army	Local peasants Communist activists

Strength
2,000 soldiers and police officers	Unknown

Casualties and losses
Unknown	3+ peasants killed 24 captured
- Hundreds of Santal villages were destroyed

The Nachole Uprising was a peasant uprising in Nachole Upazila in then East Bengal, Pakistan (now Bangladesh). It was similar to the Tebhaga movement occurring in West Bengal, India around the same time.

== History ==
Jotedars, land holders, in Nachole Upazila used to collect rent from peasants in the form of a percentage of their harvest (50 percent). The peasants, most of whom were members of the minority Santal community, revolted against the high rent in December 1949 and early 1950s. They had farmed the same land for generations without any land rights or protections. The revolt was encouraged by communist activists. The homes of Jotedars were looted. The government responded with violence in favor of the landlords. The government arrest activists like Ila Mitra, who fled to India after being released on political consideration by the government. Many of the Santal peasants who participated in the revolt fled to India.The government had deployed two thousand army and police personnel. Hundreds of villages of the Santal People were destroyed by security forces.

== Legacy ==
The government of Pakistan passed the East Bengal State Acquisition and Tenancy Act of 1950 which allow the tenets to pay rent in cash at a fixed government rate and provided them with greater rights to the property. Many of the Santals abandoned the region permanently for India as a result of the immediate government crackdown. The event is remembered and celebrated in the region on the birth anniversary of Ila Mitra. There was a period of communal violence against Hindu minority in the region with the tacit support of Pakistan security services.
