= Kisan Mazdoor Praja Party =

- Leader: J. B. Kripalani
- Founder: J. B. Kripalani
- Founded: 1951; 75 years ago
- Dissolved: 1962; 64 years ago
- Split from: Indian National Congress
- Merged into: Praja Socialist Party
- Ideology: Gandhism

Election symbol
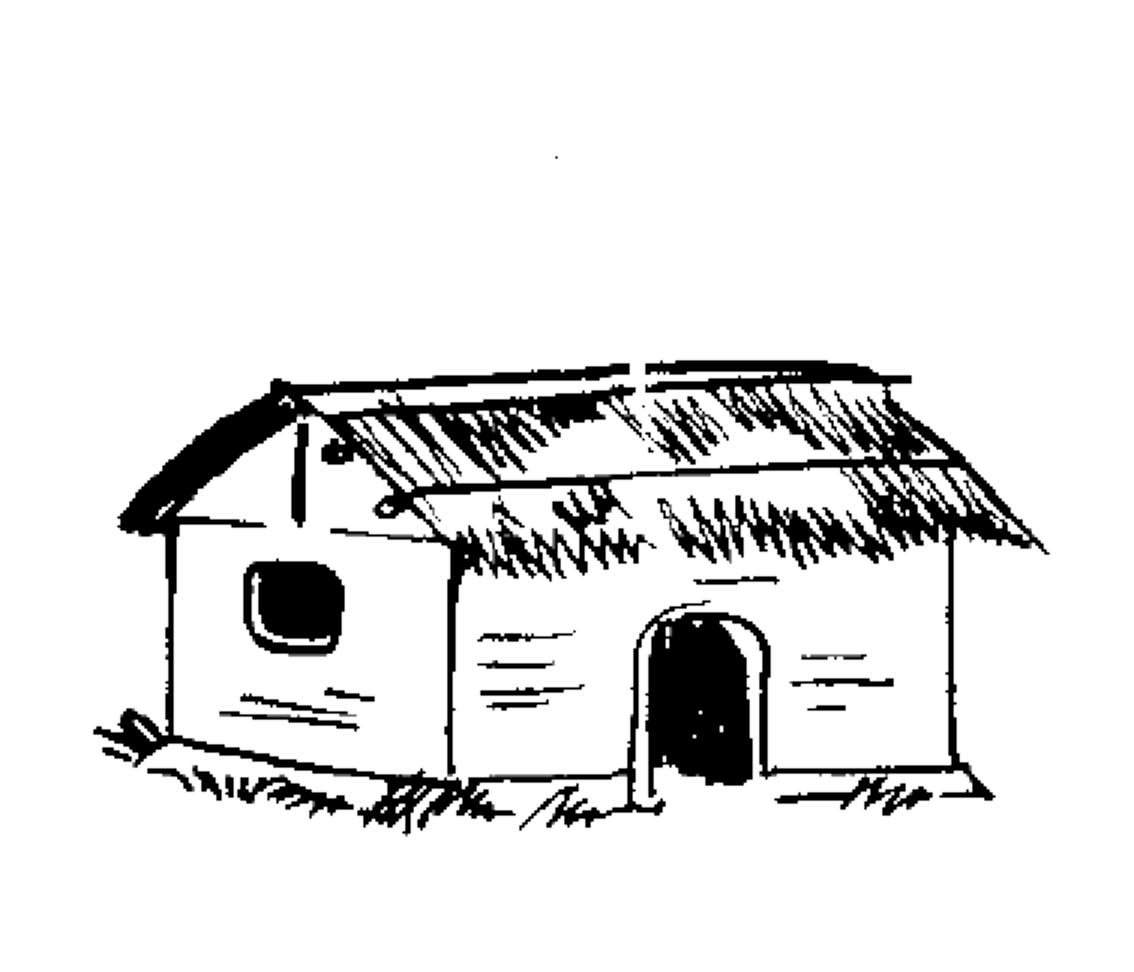

The Kisan Mazdoor Praja Party (KMPP, lit. 'Farmer Worker People's Party' or 'Peasant Worker People's Party', short name: Praja Party) was a political party in India. Established in 1951, it merged with the Socialist Party to form the Praja Socialist Party the following year. However, the Andhra Pradesh unit of the party subsequently revived the original organisation under the name Praja Party, which continued to exist until 1953.

== History ==
In June 1951, dissident members of the Indian National Congress (INC; often simply known as the Congress) under the leadership of J. B. Kripalani, established the Kisan Mazdoor Praja Party (KMPP). In the Madras Presidency, Tanguturi Prakasam, who had also broken away from the Congress to form his own political organisation, the Praja Party, merged his party with the KMPP.

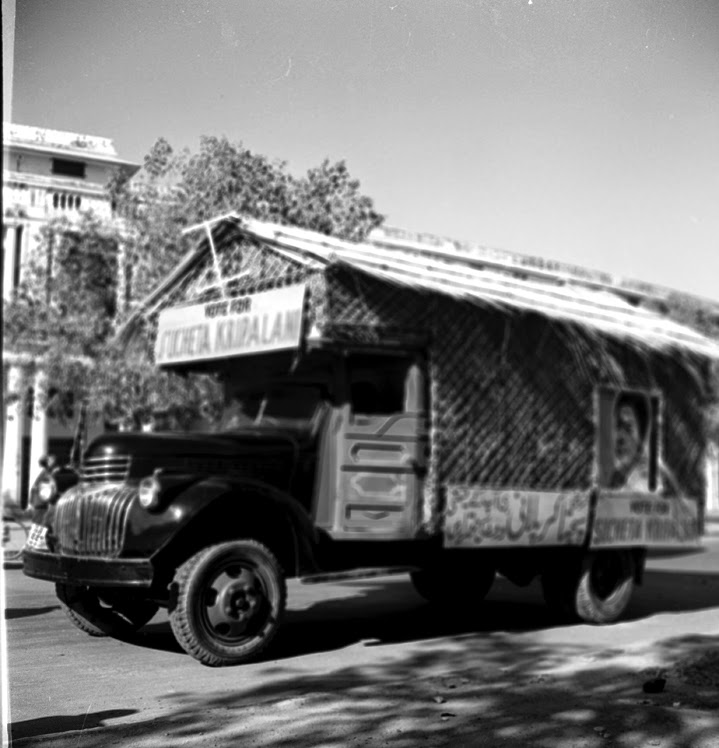
A truck fitted with the model of a Hut in 1952, the election symbol of the K.M.P.P. Party

Two of the KMPP's prominent leaders, Prafulla Chandra Ghosh and Tanguturi, had previously served as chief ministers of West Bengal and Madras, respectively. The party participated in the 1951–52 Indian general election, fielding candidates in 145 constituencies across sixteen states. Despite its broad electoral presence, the KMPP secured only ten seats in the Lok Sabha. Of these, six were won in Madras State, and one seat each in Mysore State, Delhi, Uttar Pradesh, and Vindhya Pradesh. The party garnered approximately 5.8% of the national vote. J. B. Kripalani himself contested from the now-defunct Faizabad District (North West) constituency but was unsuccessful. However, his wife, Sucheta Kripalani, was elected from the New Delhi constituency.

In September 1952, the KMPP merged with the Socialist Party, resulting in the formation of the Praja Socialist Party.

Despite the national merger, the party's unit in the Andhra region of the Madras Presidency, led by Tanguturi, retained much of its original identity. In 1953, this unit was reorganised as the Praja Party. Later that year, it was integrated into the Andhra unit of the Praja Socialist Party.

== See also ==
- Indian National Congress breakaway parties
- Haripada Chattopadhyay

== Bibliography ==
- Mathew, George, ed. (1984). Shift in Indian Politics: 1983 Elections in Andhra Pradesh and Karnataka. Studies on Indian democracy, political parties and political process. Christian Institute for the Study of Religion and Society / Concept Publishing Company.
- Weiner, Myron, ed. (2015). Party Politics in India. Princeton University Press. ISBN 978-1-4008-7841-3.
