= Communist Party of Bangladesh (Marxist–Leninist) =

Communist Party of Bangladesh (Marxist–Leninist) বাংলাদেশের সাম্যবাদী দল (মার্কসবাদী–লেনিনবাদী)
- Abbreviation: BSD
- Founder: Sukhendu Dastidar
- Founded: 1972
- Preceded by: East Pakistan Communist Party (Marxist–Leninist)
- Ideology: Communism; Marxism–Leninism; Mao Zedong Thought
- Political position: Left-wing to far-left
- Colors: Red

Communist Party of Bangladesh (Marxist–Leninist) was the name used by several political parties in Bangladesh. These groups emerged at different times as splinter factions of the East Pakistan Communist Party (Marxist–Leninist). Among them, three organisations were particularly prominent: the Communist Party of Bangladesh (Marxist–Leninist) (Barua), the Communist Party of Bangladesh (Marxist–Leninist) (Dutta), and the Communist Party of Bangladesh (Marxist–Leninist) (Umar), all of which remained active in Bangladesh during the post–Cold War years.

== Early history ==
In 1967–68, a split emerged within the undivided Communist Party of East Pakistan, influenced by the wider ideological conflict of the Sino–Soviet split. At the party's first congress, held on 1–3 October 1967, the East Pakistan Communist Party (Marxist–Leninist) was founded under the leadership of Sukhendu Dastidar and Mohammad Toaha, adopting Marxism, Leninism, and Mao Zedong thought as its ideological basis.

In 1972, Sukhendu Dastidar changed the party's name from East Pakistan Communist Party (Marxist–Leninist) to the Communist Party of Bangladesh (Marxist–Leninist).

In 1976, the faction led by Alauddin Ahmed joined the Communist Party. In 1977, the party split into two groups. One faction was organised under the leadership of Sukhendu Dastidar and Mohammad Toaha, while the other came under the leadership of Abdul Haque, Shardindu Dastidar, Ajay Bhattacharya, and Hemanta Sarkar.

== Badruddin Umar faction ==
On 14–15 August 1976, the East Bengal Revolutionary Party, Communist Workers' League, and a faction of the party met in a unity congress and adopted a new name. The congress elected a central committee and approved a political report. At this congress, Badruddin Umar, Sirajul Hossain Khan, Abul Bashar, and Dr. Saif‑ud‑Dahar, among others, emerged as leaders of the new party.

== Abdul Haque faction ==
After independence, Abdul Haque was elected general secretary of the faction he led. Despite the independence of Bangladesh his faction continued to use the name "East Pakistan Communist Party." In 1978, Abdul Haque's faction adopted the name Revolutionary Communist Party of Bangladesh (Marxist–Leninist). The party's seventh congress was held on 7–9 April 1988, The eighth congress, held in 1991, was the last during Haque's lifetime.

== Nani Gopal Dutta faction ==
In 1976, following a decision of the party plenum, the party was kept underground while one section was directed to take up opportunities for open work. In this context, Nani Gopal Dutta, also known as Ajay Dutta or Mostak, served for a period as the party's secretary. In 1982, when Dutta and his followers refrained from participating in the party's fourth congress, a split emerged.

== Dilip Barua faction ==
In 1985, the Toaha faction, the Ali Abbas faction, and the Dilip Barua faction united, and the party became known as the Communist Party of Bangladesh (Marxist–Leninist) (Barua), which is a registered political party.
