= Aminul Islam Badsha =

Bangladeshi language movement activist and freedom fighter

- আমিনুল ইসলাম বাদশা
- Born: 14 April 1929; Pabna, Bengal Presidency
- Died: 4 August 1998 (aged 45); Dhaka
- Occupation: activist

Aminul Islam Badsha (14 April 1929 – 4 August 1998) was a Bangladeshi language movement activist and freedom fighter. In recognition of his contribution in the Bengali language movement in 1952, the government of Bangladesh awarded him the country's second highest civilian award Ekushey Padak posthumously in 2020.

== Birth ==
Aminul Islam Badsha was born on April 14, 1929, in Krishnapur Mahalla, Pabna, Bangladesh. His father is Nuruzzaman Sheikh and mother are Khabiren Nesa.

== Political Life ==
in 1943 During World War II, Aminul Pabna, while a student at the Gopal Chandra Institution, joined Selina Banu and Comrade Pratima Kumar Roy in Communist Party politics of India and joined the Student Federation. He participated in the independence and famine resistance movement in British India.

Aminul participated in this when a democratic Jubo League was formed at the Youth Conference held at Ishwardi in Pabna on 4 November 1947 under the leadership of Raja Shahi leader Ataur Rahman. He was involved in the formation of the Democratic Jubo League in 1948 the early part of the year and participated in various movements against the All India Muslim League, including imprisonment. Pabna District democratic activist was elected joint-convener of the Shibir in the run-up to the United Front elections in the provincial elections. In 1970, Maulana Abdul Hamid Khan joined the National Awami Party NAP formed by Bhasani, and as a candidate for the party, the provincial council contested in the general election in 1970.Pabna became a member of the High Command of the Liberation War formed by the Deputy Commissioner in 1971. He was appointed to the War of Liberation in Kolkata when the Pakistani forces occupied Pabna district on April 10 of that year. After independence, Bangladesh played a role in developing a progressive alternative to the politics of the country.

== Language Movements ==
Aminulul was elected joint convener of the Parishad when the state - language struggle council was formed at the all-party meeting on February 26, 1948. According to the decision of the all-party meeting on 27 February, the strike was observed on 29 February 1948 in Pabna. He led a procession of students in the city of Pabna following the strike.

== Prisons ==
Police arrested 4 agitators including Aminul Islam Badsha from the strike program for violating Article 5. Later, in the face of the agitation, the court was released on the same day, along with his other staff. He was again arrested on March 2 and released a few days later. [2]

On April 27, 9, the revolutionary firing of the jail police over the detainees arrested at Rajshahi Central Jail Khapra ward was killed and more than 7 prisoners were seriously injured. Aminul Islam Badsha was one of the injured. Until the day of his death, he had a bullet in his leg. Prevent yourself from receiving state or party benefits for foot treatment.

Aminul was arrested on February 22, 2006, during a provincial election campaign. He was released after a month of imprisonment when the Muslim League was defeated in that election. Two months later, the United Front leader, Sherbangla Fazlul Haque, was arrested immediately after the cancellation of the provincial government of East Bengal.

== Death ==
He died on 4 August 1994 on his way to the Holy Family Hospital in Dhaka.
