= Ganotantrik Biplobi Jote =

Ganotantrik Biplobi Jote (Democratic Revolutionary Unity) is the mass front of Communist Party of Bangladesh (Marxist–Leninist) (Umar). GBJ was founded in 1987.

The students' wing of GBJ is Bangladesh Students Federation.

GBJ publishes Sanskriti (Cultural), Janojug (People's Era), and Trinamul (Grassroot).
