= Gour Chandra Bala =

Bangladeshi politician

- গৌরচন্দ্র বালা

Forest, Agriculture and Food Minister
- In office 1957–1958
- Succeeded by: Kazi Abdul Kader

Personal details
- Born: 1927 Ullabari, Faridpur District, Bengal Presidency, British India
- Died: 18 June 2005 (aged 77–78) Faridpur, Bangladesh
- Party: BAKSAL
- Other party: AL (1964–1975); SCF (1954–1958)
- Profession: Lawyer

Gour Chandra Bala (1927–2005) was a Bangladeshi lawyer and politician.

== Biography ==
Bala was born in 1927 in Ullabari, Faridpur District, Bengal Presidency, British India (present-day Rajoir Upazila, Madaripur District, Bangladesh). He was a schoolteacher in Faridpur. He started his political career in 1946 actively. A member of East Bengal Scheduled Castes Federation, Bala was elected to the East Bengal Legislative Assembly in 1954 and Constituent Assembly of Pakistan in 1955 from Faridpur North-East. He was East Pakistan's Forest and Food Minister in 1957. In 1970, he was elected to the Provincial Assembly of East Pakistan. He joined Bangladesh Liberation War in 1971. He was selected as a member of Constituent Assembly of Bangladesh in 1972. In 1975, he retired from politics. Bala died on 18 June 2005 in Jhiltuli, Faridpur, Bangladesh.
