= Khilafat-i-Rabbani Party =

Islamic political party established in Pakistan and currently active in Bangladesh

- President: Abul Hashim (1952-1956)
- Founded: 21 April 1952
- Merged into: Islami Oikya Jote
- Ideology: Islamism

Khilafat-I-Rabbani Party (lit. 'Divine Sovereign Party') is an Islamic political party in Bangladesh. It was founded on 21 April 1952 in East Bengal and was formally lanuched in September 1953 by Abul Hashim. The party participated in the 1954 East Bengal Legislative Assembly election. They demanded provincial autonomy and adoption of Bengali as one of the national languages in their election manifesto.

== History ==
=== Early Years ===
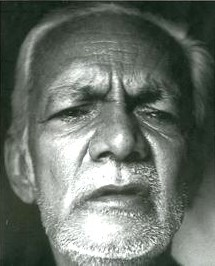
Abul Hashim, the first president of Khilafat-i-Rabbani Party.

In 1952, the supporters of Tamaddun Majlish established the party with former Muslim League leader Abul Hashim as it's president. The party supported the Bengali language movement by participating at the Shorbodolio Kendrio Rashtrobhasha Kormi Porishod. Although Khilafat-i-Rabbani was not officially a part of the United Front in the 1954 election, they had an agreement regarding not putting candidates in constituencies where members of the United Front are contesting. They secured one seat in the 1954 election. Abul Hashim led the party until 1956.

=== Post-Independence ===
In 1976, after the independence of Bangladesh, Khilafat-i-Rabbani became part of the Islamic Democratic League, an alliance of the far right political parties.

In 2017, the party alied itself with Islami Oikya Jote. As of 2017, the party is not registered under the Bangladesh Election Commission. As of 2023, Foyzul Haque Jalalabadi is the leader of the party.

== Bibliography ==
Nair, M Bhaskaran (1990). Politics in Bangladesh: A Study of Awami League, 1949-58 (PDF). India: Northern Book Centre (New Delhi). ISBN 8185119791.
