= Haripada Chattopadhyay =

Indian politician (1897–1967)

Haripada Chattopadhyay (1897 – 11 November 1967) was an Indian politician, Member of Parliament, Lok Sabha and Bengali revolutionary.

== Early life ==
Chattopadhyay was born at Krishnanagar, Nadia. He was the maternal cousin of Bengali revolutionary Bagha Jatin. His father Basanta Kumar Chattopadhyay was a reputed advocate and attached with Tagore family of Shilaidah and Kolkata. Haripada Chattopadhyay entered in University of Calcutta, passed M.Sc. in chemistry with first class under the guidance of Dr. Prafulla Chandra Ray. In student life he was befriended with Netaji Subhas Chandra Bose.

== Political life ==
Chattopadhyay attracted to Indian national movement and took the membership of Indian National Congress in Nadia district. He first imprisoned in Dhaka jail in 1921 after joining the Non-cooperation movement led by Mahatma Gandhi. He also joined with Quit India Movement in 1942 and arrested several times. He was one of the founder of nationalist Abhay Ashram at Comilla and Agro industrial firm at Sahebnagar, Nadia district. He became an active member of Congress party in West Bengal Legislative Assembly (the then Bangio Byabosthapok Sabha) since 1937 to 1951. He contested in Karimpur (Vidhan Sabha constituency) in 1951 and won the seat in the banner of Kisan Mazdoor Praja Party. Chattopadhyay elected as independent candidate from the Nabadwip (Lok Sabha constituency) and Krishnanagar (Lok Sabha constituency) respectively in 1962 and 1967. He was popular as good orator and parliamentarian in Indian politics.

== Personal life ==
Chattopadhyay had one and only son Abhijit Chattopadhyay. Abhijit latter become Lieutenant in Indian Army and died in battlefield of Kashmir at the time of Indo-Pakistani War of 1965. He was killed near Lahore in a Pakistani counter-attack, while leading a battalion into the Battle of Ichogil Bund.

== Death ==
Chattopadhyay died on 11 November 1967.
