= Socialist (weekly newspaper) =

Pakistani Newspaper

- Type: Weekly newspaper
- Publisher: Pakistan Socialist Party
- Editor-in-chief: Mobarak Sagher
- Founded: 1947
- Language: Urdu
- Headquarters: Karachi
- Circulation: 2,500

Socialist (Urdu: سوشلسٹ) was an Urdu language newspaper published from Karachi, Pakistan. Socialist was launched in late 1947 as a continuation of the Sindhi Socialist Weekly. Socialist carried the symbol of the Indian Socialist Party in its masthead. It became the official organ of the Pakistan Socialist Party when the party was constituted in January 1948. The original editorial board consisted of Mobarak Sagher (chief editor), Munshi Ahmad Din, Siddique Lodhi, Ram Mohan Sinha, Kali Charan and Mohammed Yusuf Khan. Socialist had a circulation of around 2,500.
