= Communist Party of Bangladesh (Marxist–Leninist) (Umar) =

Communist Party of Bangladesh (Marxist–Leninist) বাংলাদেশের সাম্যবাদী দল (মার্কসবাদী-লেনিনবাদী)
- Abbreviation: BSD-ML
- Leader: vacant
- Split from: Communist Party of Bangladesh (Marxist–Leninist)
- Newspaper: Sanskriti (Cultural); Janojug (People's Era); Trinamul (Grassroot)
- Student wing: Bangladesh Students' Federation
- Armed wing: Ganotantrik Biplobi Jote
- Ideology: Communism; Marxism–Leninism
- Political position: Far-left

The Communist Party of Bangladesh (Marxist–Leninist) (Bengali: বাংলাদেশের সাম্যবাদী দল (মার্কসবাদী-লেনিনবাদী)) is a Marxist–Leninist communist party in Bangladesh led by Badruddin Umar. Umar's BSD (ML) is an underground party and operates through its front Ganotantrik Biplobi Jote.
