= Prabhas Chandra Lahiri =

Bengali writer and politician

Provincial Minister of East Pakistan
- In office 15 August 1956 – 30 August 1956
- Governor: A. K. Fazlul Huq
- Department: Finance and Revenue
- Preceded by: Basanta Kumar Das

Personal details
- Born: 1893 Rajshahi District, Bengal Presidency, British India
- Died: 2 January 1974 (aged 80–81) Berhampore, West Bengal, India
- Party: UPP (1954–1958)
- Other political affiliations: PGS (1948–1954); PNC (1947–1948); INC (1921–1947)
- Education: Rajshahi College
- Occupation: Writer
- Nickname: Shri Prabhas Lahiri

Prabhas Chandra Lahiri (1893–1974) was a Bengali writer, revolutionary, and politician. He served twice as a provincial minister in East Pakistan.

== Early life ==
Lahiri was born in 1893 in Arani (located in present-day Bagha Upazila, Bangladesh), Rajshahi District, Bengal Presidency, British India, to Jyotish Chandra Lahiri. After receiving his education at Natore High School and Rajshahi College, Lahiri later enrolled at a college in Calcutta (present-day Kolkata, India).

== Activism ==
During student life, he joined the Swadeshi movement. He later came into close contact with revolutionary Trailokyanath Chakravarty and joined the armed anti-British organisation Anushilan Samiti. He became known as one of its leading organizers in North Bengal and played a significant role in the Dharail dacoity. During World War I, as British authorities intensified repression against freedom fighters, he was relocated on the organisation's instructions to Calcutta and later to Gauhati (present-day Guwahati, India) in the Assam Province. However, the police raided the office of Anushilan Samiti there, prompting Lahiri to join the resistance against them, an episode known as the Gauhati struggle. After escaping from the incident, he was arrested in 1918 and imprisoned until 1921. He was arrested again in 1930 after participating in the Salt March.

== Political career ==
In 1921, he joined the Indian National Congress (INC). He contested the provincial elections of 1946 and was elected as a member of the Bengal Legislative Assembly from the Rajshahi (general) constituency. In the following year, after the partition of India, Lahiri remained in the newly formed state of Pakistan. In 1948, he co-founded Pakistan Gana Samiti (PGS) which was later renamed to United Progressive Party (UPP). Subsequently, during the 1950s, he became a member of the East Bengal Legislative Assembly. He served twice as the acting provincial minister for the Jails and Finance departments. Around 1956, Lahiri became the reason of the UPP's split when he took the offer of Chief Minister Abu Hussain Sarkar to accept the ministerial post in the First Abu Hussain Sarkar ministry.

== Later life and death ==
In 1962, Lahiri visited to Berhampore of the Indian state West Bengal, to visit his ailing brother Jitesh Chandra Lahiri. He subsequently remained there and died in the town on 2 January 1974.

== Works ==
Lahiri's significant writings include:

- বিপ্লবী জীবন (lit. 'Revolutionary life')
- India Partitioned and Minorities in Pakistan
- পাক-ভারতের রূপরেখা (lit. 'Outline of India-Pakistan')
- মুক্তি-সৈনিকের ডায়েরী (lit. 'Diary of a Freedom Fighter')
