= East Bengal Scheduled Castes Federation =

The East Bengal Scheduled Castes Federation (Bengali: পূর্ববঙ্গ তফসিলি জাতি ফেডারেশন), later the East Pakistan Scheduled Castes Federation (Bengali: পূর্ব পাকিস্তান তফসিলি জাতি ফেডারেশন), was a political party in Pakistan. In the first years after the independence of Pakistan, the party was one of the two main political parties of the Hindu minority population in East Bengal (with the other being the Pakistan National Congress). After departure of its main leader Jogendra Nath Mandal in 1950, the party suffered a number of divisions. In the mid-1950s the party participated in different coalition governments at Pakistan Centre level and East Pakistan provincial level. After 1958 the party went into oblivion.

== Background ==
The All India Scheduled Castes Federation had been founded by B.R. Ambedkar in Allahabad in 1942, as a political organization striving for the upliftment of Scheduled Castes/Dalits. In the years running up to the Partition of India there were formal alliances between the All India Muslim League and the Scheduled Castes Federation in Bengal, United Provinces and Punjab. In Bengal the Scheduled Castes Federation chapter led by Jogendra Nath Mandal championed maintaining the province united, a position the party shared with the Muslim League. When Pakistan was formed, Mandal joined the first Dominion of Pakistan government as Minister of Law and Labour after having received approval from Ambedkar to do so. In parallel Ambedkar held the post of Minister of Law in the Dominion of India. However, with the split of India and Pakistan into two separate entities, the Scheduled Castes Federation branches in Pakistan eventually broke their organizational links with the Indian mother party and held a party conference in Karachi in 1948. Overwhelmingly the Scheduled Castes Federation in Pakistan was based in East Bengal.

== Early years after Partition ==
Mandal was the president of the East Bengal Scheduled Castes Federation in 1948. The party argued for separate electorate for Scheduled Castes, and had tense relations with the Pakistan National Congress on this issue. The East Bengal Scheduled Castes Federation called for increased representation of Scheduled Castes based on 1948 population estimate. Notably the party was unhappy with the lack of Scheduled Castes representation in the East Bengal provincial government.

In 1949 the Working Committee of the East Bengal Scheduled Castes Federation passed a unimanous resolution calling a joint minority electorate but with reservation of seats for the Scheduled Castes.

In the wake of the 1950 Dacca riots, Mandal's discourse shifted significantly. He now positioned himself as a protector for Hindu and minority communities in East Bengal, and began downplaying the rhetorical separation between Caste Hindus and Scheduled Castes. By April 1950, after riots in Barisal, Mandal told his followers that he would no longer advise them to stay in Pakistan. Other leaders of the party rejected Mandal's statement.

East Bengal Scheduled Castes Federation president D.N. Barori was sworn in as minister in the East Bengal provincial government in June 1950. Barori's nomination had been fiercely opposed by Jogendra Nath Mandal.

== Electorate issue split ==
The issue of separate or joint electorate would split the party. Barori supported a separate electorate for Scheduled Castes.

An East Bengal Minorities Conference held at Comilla in March 1952, which called for joint electorate and denounced Barori. Out of 500 delegates at the conference, some 300 came from the Scheduled Castes. The Comilla conference called on the government to dismiss Barori and replace him with another representative with support from the minorities. The resolution of the Comilla conference stated that separate representation on communal basis is anti-national.

On December 19, 1953, the anti-Barori camp in the East Bengal Scheduled Castes Federation organized a conference in Dacca and declared Barori and his faction expelled for having violated the party line on joint electorates. The conference had been called by Rasaraj Mandal, and Raj Kumar Mandal chaired the event. Invited speakers at the event included Maulana Bhasani, A. K. Fazlul Huq, Huseyn Shaheed Suhrawardy, Basanta Kumar Das and Mahmud Ali.

Barori retained support in the East Bengal Legislative Assembly group of the party, whilst the dissident group (led by Rasaraj Mandal) controlled the party organization. A second minor split occurred in the Barori group, seemingly caused by personal issues.

== 1954 elections ==
Three different groups participated in the 1954 East Bengal Legislative Assembly election, claiming to be the genuine Scheduled Castes Federation - led by D.N. Barori, Rasaraj Mandal and H.C. Burmen respectively. The Barori group, which supported separate electorates, enjoyed the support of the Pakistan Muslim League. The Mandal group, which supported joint electorates, had tacit support from the Minority United Front. The United Progressive Party (formerly Gana Samity) had sought appealed to the Mandal group to contest under the banner of the Minority United Front, but for Mandal's group it was important not to allow the Barori group to be able to use the party name 'Scheduled Castes Federation' alone in front of the Scheduled Castes voters.

The Mandal faction emerged successful, winning 27 out 38 seats reserved for Scheduled Castes. The Barori faction didn't win a single seat, with Barori himself forfeiting his deposit after having lost his seat to Gour Chandra Bala.

In 1955 the Scheduled Castes Federation obtained three seats in the second Constituent Assembly of Pakistan (with Rasaraj Mandal being one of the three members).

== Coalition government period and party split ==
The party was part of the first coalition government of Pakistan (led by Chaudhry Muhammad Ali, August 11, 1955 – September 12, 1956), the second coalition government of Pakistan (led by Huseyn Shaheed Suhrawardy, September 12, 1956 – October 17, 1957) and the fourth coalition government of Pakistan (led by Feroz Khan Noon, December 16, 1957 – October 7, 1958).

Akshay Kumar Das, President of the Working Committee of the East Bengal Scheduled Castes Federation, was sworn in as Minister of State for Economic Affairs in the Pakistan government on September 26, 1955. A year later Rasaraj Mandal, then the general secretary of the party, was sworn in as a Minister of State for Economic Affairs in the Pakistan government. With Mandal taking a ministerial role at the Centre, whilst his inner-party rival Gour Chandra Bala was elected as leader of the Scheduled Castes Federation in the East Pakistan Provincial Assembly. At the time six of the Scheduled Castes Federation assembly members belonged to the Rasaraj Mandal group, with another 21 belonging to the Bala group. A resolution was passed in the party that Bala would not join the provincial government. However Bala soon took up ministerial post in East Pakistan. When the Suhrawardy government at the Centre fell in March 1958, Mandal was left without a ministerial berth and Bala became a minister in East Pakistan. In response Mandal went into opposition.

In East Pakistan, the party was part of the Abu Hussain Sarkar provincial cabinet between June 1955 and August 1956. When the Awami League formed a provincial government led by Ataur Rahman Khan in September 1956, part of the Scheduled Castes Federation went into opposition whilst another supported the government from outside. The party was part of the short-lived second Abu Hussain Sarkar government, in power between March 31 and April 1, 1958. When Ataur Rahman Khan again formed a provincial government in April 1958 the Bala group joined it but the Mandal group went into opposition.

With the deepening of the Mandal-Bala split during the budget session in the East Pakistan Provincial Assembly in 1958, the party organization disintegrated. With the divided party leadership fully embroiled in the legislature, the party organization outside parliament became inactive. Another key issue that forced the party into quick decline was the introduction of unified geographic constituencies across Pakistan.

== Bangladeshi independence ==
In 1971 the party led by Rasaraj Mandal took the name Bangladesh Tafsili Jati Federation. Rasaraj Mandal revived the party after the promulgation of the Political Parties Regulation in July 1976.
