= Sovarani Datta =

Indian revolutionary (1906–1950)

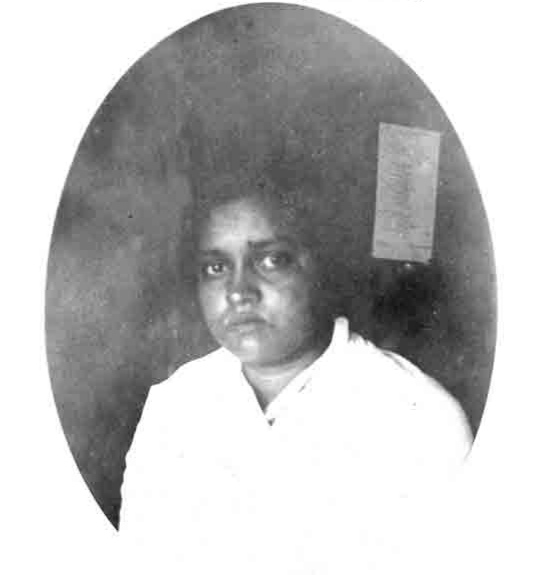
- Born: Sobha Rani Datta; 11 September 1906
- Died: 9 November 1950 (aged 44)
- Education: Brahma Girls School, Prem Mahavidyalaya
- Occupation: Revolutionary
- Organization: Ananda Math
- Parents: Jatindranath Dutta (father); Labanyaprabha Dutta (mother)

Sovarani Datta (11 September 1906 – 9 November 1950) also known as Shobha Rani Dutta was an Indian Revolutionary. She established Ananda Math and also an active member of Satyagrah Samiti. She was convicted in the Titagarh conspiracy case and the Dalhousie Square Bomb case.

== Early life and education ==
Datta was born to Labanyaprabha Dutta, an Indian National Congress leader, and Jatindranath Dutta on 11 September 1906 in Kolkata, India.

She was educated at Brahma Girls School, Kolkata and at Prem Mahavidyalaya, Vrindavan, an educational institution established by Raja Mahendra Pratap.

== Legacy ==
- Sovarani Memorial College, Howrah
