= Bhabani Prasad Bhattacharya =

Bengali anti-colonial revolutionary (1914–1935)

Bhavani Prasad Bhattacharyya
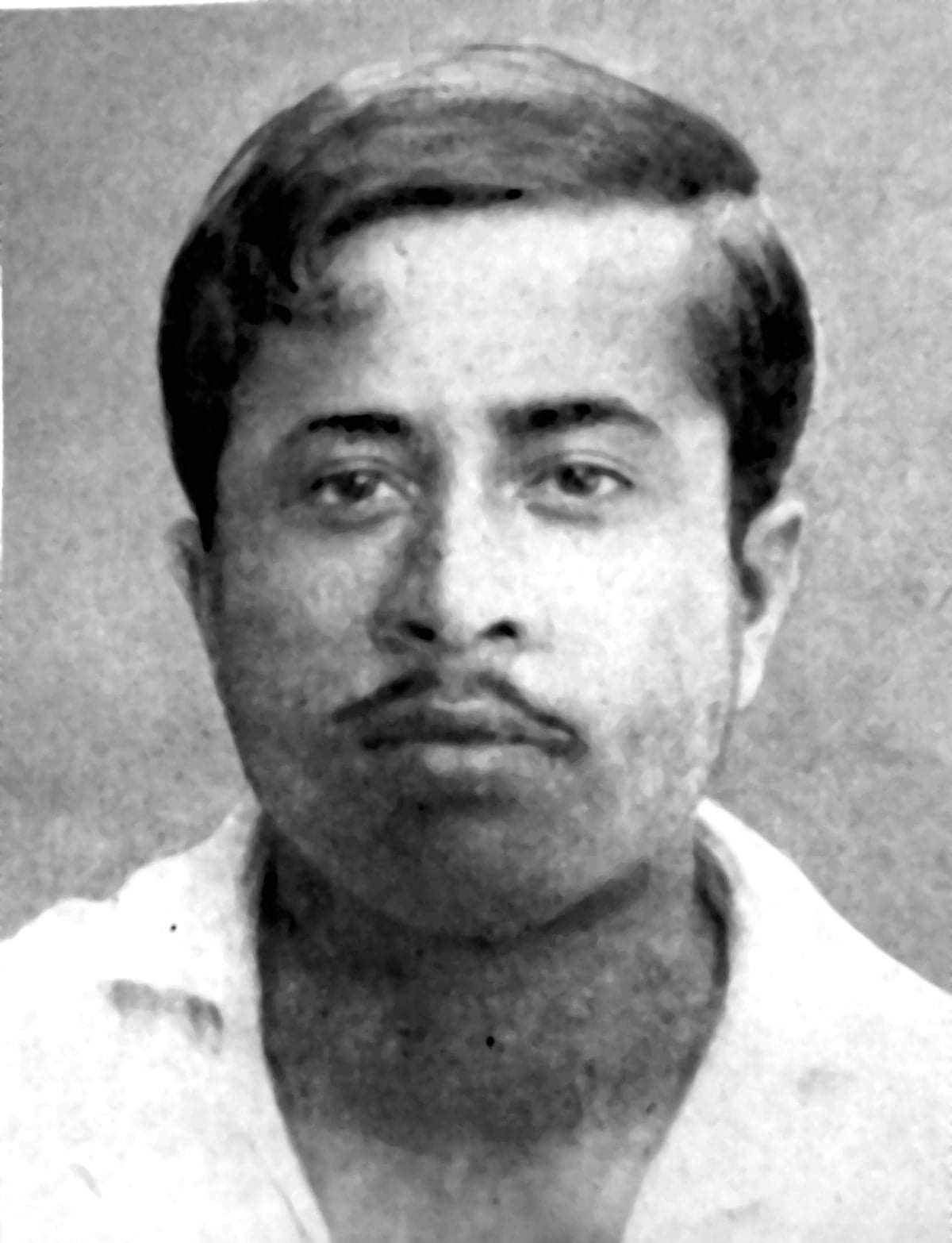
- Bhavani Prasad Bhattacharyya
- Born: 10 June 1914; Joydevpur, Dhaka, British India
- Died: 3 February 1935 (aged 20)
- Movement: Indian Freedom Movement

Bhavani Prasad Bhattacharyya (10 June 1914 – 3 February 1935) was an Indian revolutionary and member of the Bengal Volunteers who carried out assassinations against British colonial officials in an attempt to secure Indian independence.

== Family ==
Bhavani prasad Bhattacharyya was born in Joydevpur, Gazipur district, Dhaka in 1914. His father was Basanta Kumar Bhattacharyya and mother, Damayanti Devi. He joined the Bengal Volunteers, a revolutionary organisation of British India at an early age.

== Revolutionary activities ==
=== Assassination attempt of John Anderson ===
Bhabani Prasad Bhattacharya, travelled to Darjeeling with Ujjwala Majumdar, Sukumar Ghosh, Ravi Banerjee, and some other revolutionary activists to assassinate Governor John Anderson; he hid his weapon in a harmonium carried by Ujjwala Majumder. Ujjwala entered a hotel and posed as a married couple with Manoranjan Banerjee. On May 6, 1934, Bhavani Prasad Bhattacharya shot the governor at the Darjeeling Lebong Racecourse, but only inflicted minor injuries. He was caught and later hanged. Ujjwala Majumdar and Manoranjan Banerjee fled to Calcutta in disguise and took refuge in Sovarani Dutt's house. Police arrested them on May 18, 1934. Sukumar Ghosh and Ujjwala Majumder was sentenced to 14 years in prison and Bhabani Prasad was sentenced to death.

== Death ==
He was hanged in Rajshahi Central Jail on February 3, 1935. After independence, there were demands from various quarters to change the name of the house. With that in mind, Anderson House was renamed Bhabani Bhaban in 1989. It is now the headquarters of the State Police of the Government of West Bengal.
