= Bhabani Prasad Mandal =

Indian theoretical physicist

- Born: 29 January 1968 (age 58); West Bengal
- Citizenship: Indian
- Education: Visva-Bharati University(BSc) Visva-Bharati University(MSc) IIT Kanpur(PhD)
- Title: Professor of Physics and Fellow of National Academy of Science
- Website: bhu.ac.in/Site/FacultyProfile/1_158?FA000646

Bhabani Prasad Mandal, FNASc is an Indian theoretical physicist and distinguished professor at the Banaras Hindu University. He has done notable work in Quantum Field theory, Generalized BRST Transformations, RG Technique, Non-Hermitian Quantum Field theories.

== Biography ==
Mandal did his BSc and MSc in Physics from Visva Bharati University.

== Honours and awards ==
- Visiting Scientist, Yukawa Institute of Theoretical Physics, Kyoto University, December 2025 to January 2026.
- C N R Rao Education Foundation Award for excellence in research for the year 2022-23, in 2024
- Fellow Award by National Academy of Science in 2023
- ICSC World Laboratory (Lausanne, Switzerland) award in theoretical physics in memory of SUBRAHMANYAN Award by ICSC World Laboratory, Lausanne, Switzerland in 1998.
- DAAD visitation fellowship Award by Helmholtz-Zentru-Rossendorf, Dresden, Germany in 2020.
- JSPS Bridge Fellowship Award by Nihon University, Tokyo in 2015.
