= Nawab Abdul Jabbar =

British Indian bureaucrat (1837–1918)

Khan Bahadur Nawab Abdul Jabbar C.I.E
- Born: 24 October 1837; Paharhati, Burdwan district, Bengal Presidency
- Died: 30 January 1918 (aged 80)
- Education: Presidency College Calcutta
- Occupation: Government officer
- Organization(s): Central National Mohammedan Association; Mohammedan Literary Society
- Children: Khan Bahadur Abdul Momen
- Father: Khan Bahadur Ghulam Asghar
- Relatives: Abul Kasem (nephew); Abul Hashim (grandnephew); Badruddin Umar (great grandnephew)
- Awards: Khan Bahadur, C.I.E, Nawab

Nawab Abdul Jabbar (Bengali: নবাব আব্দুল জব্বার; 24 October 1837 – 30 January 1918) was a British Indian bureaucrat and social worker.

== Early life ==
Abdul Jabbar was born on 24 October 1837 in his maternal grandfather's home in Paharhati, Burdwan district, Bengal Presidency. He belonged to a Bengali Muslim family from the village of Kashiara in Burdwan. His father Khan Bahadur Ghulam Asghar was the Chief Sadar Amin in the judiciary of the British East India Company rule. Abdul Jabbar passed his matriculation from Burdwan Raj School. Here, he was a student of Ramtanu Lahiri. Then he was admitted in Presidency College Calcutta in BA class. After his father's death in 1857 he left education.

== Career ==
At the beginning of his career he joined as a deputy magistrate. Between 1889 and 1894 he served as presidency magistrate in Calcutta. In 1884, 1886 and 1893 he was nominated member in Bengal Legislative Council. After retirement he was appointed the chief minister of Bhopal and served from 1897 to 1902. There he was honored for his contribution in social welfare work.

In a meeting arranged in Calcutta by Surendranath Banerjee to support Gandhi's anti racism movement in South Africa Abdul Jabbar was the president. Indian National Congress and All India Muslim League was founded during his lifetime but he never showed interest in politics.

== Contribution in Muslim society ==
He was a member of Central National Mohammedan Association, first organization of Indian Muslims. He was also a member of Mohammedan Literary Society and in 1900 elected president of the society. He had close relation with Nawab Abdul Latif. Abdul Jabbar was eager to promote western education among the Muslims. He wrote a book in Bengali titled Muslim Dharma Porichoy (Muslim Religion Introduction) . He did not show much interest in women education. He presented his view on woman education in his two Urdu books.

In Calcutta, Taylor hostel was built for the Muslim students in 1896. Due to its unhealthy environment and inadequate facilities he initiated movement in 1908 to establish new hostel. Eventually Baker Hostel was established for the Muslim students.

== Honors ==
Abdul Jabbar was awarded Khan Bahadur and CIE in 1895. Later, he received Nawab title.

== Death ==
Abdul Jabbar died on 30 January 1918.
