= Holwell Monument agitation =

1940 removal of Black Hole of Calcutta monument

The Holwell Monument agitation was a political campaign led by Subhas Chandra Bose in 1940 to remove a monument to the Black Hole of Calcutta (now Kolkata). The agitation marked a significant moment of unity between Hindu nationalists and the All-India Muslim League.

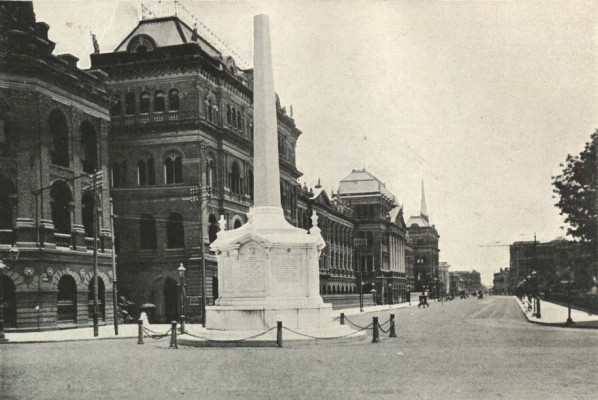
Holwell Monument in front of Writer's Building in 1905

== Background ==
After the 1756 Siege of Calcutta allowed Siraj-ud-Daulah to retake the city from the East India Company, British prisoners-of-war were kept in the Black Hole of Calcutta dungeon. Overcrowding caused significant deaths due to suffocation and heat exhaustion. In 1760, survivor John Zephaniah Holwell, then serving as Governor of Bengal, erected a monument in Dalhousie Square commemorating the event. Indian nationalists despised the monument for portraying Siraj-ud-Daulah, the last independent Nawab of Bengal, as a tyrant unfit to rule.

== Agitation ==
In 1897, historian Akshay Kumar Maitreya denied Holwell's account of 123 of the 146 prisoners of war dying, noting that the event was not mentioned by British and Indian historians of the time. Holwell was only able to recall 66 of the prisoners' names and many of those listed were later proven to have not been present at Fort William during the siege. British headmaster James H. Little's 1915 translation of Maitreya's work from Bengali to English raised further doubt on whether 146 people could have been squeezed into the 14 by 18 foot dungeon.

Only a month after Subhas Chandra Bose led students of Presidency College in attacking history professor Edward Farley Oaten for remarks justifying British colonization, Oaten debated with Maitreya and Little over the Black Hole incident in the Calcutta Historical Society. This debate prompted Lord Curzon to question Little's loyalty to the British Empire. A. K. Fazlul Huq, the first Prime Minister of Bengal, began calling for the monument's removal in 1938, recognizing that the issue united Hindu nationalists and the All-India Muslim League.

On 2 July 1940, Subhas Chandra Bose was arrested under the Defence of India Act of 1939 for calling for a Siraj-ud-Daulah Day coinciding with the 183rd anniversary of the latter's execution by Mir Jafar under orders from the East India Company. To prevent further agitation, Bengal Governor John Herbert quietly dismantled the monument. After a seven-day hunger strike, Bose was moved from the city's Presidency Jail to house arrest on 5 December, at which point he escaped to Nazi Germany, never to return to India.
