= Abul Hashim =

Indian politician

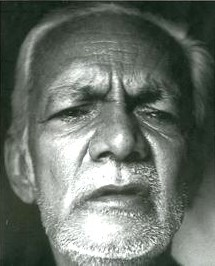

General Secretary, Bengal Provincial Muslim League

Member of the Bengal Legislative Assembly
- In office 1937–1947
- Constituency: Burdwan

Personal details
- Born: 27 January 1905 Kashiara, Purba Bardhaman, Bengal, British India
- Died: 5 October 1974 (aged 69)
- Party: All-India Muslim League, Khilafat-i-Rabbani Party
- Children: Badruddin Umar
- Parent: Abul Kasem (father)
- Relatives: Nawab Abdul Jabbar (granduncle); Khan Bahadur Abdul Momen (uncle)
- Education: Burdwan Raj College; University of Calcutta

Abul Hashim (25 January 1905 – 5 October 1974) was a Bangladeshi politician and Islamic thinker.

== Early life and education ==
Abul Hashim was born on 25 January 1905 to a Bengali family of Muslim zamindars in the village of Kashiara (later renamed Kasemnagar) in the Burdwan district of the Bengal Presidency. He was the son of politician Abul Kasem and grandnephew of Nawab Abdul Jabbar.

He graduated from Burdwan Raj College in 1928, which was then affiliated with the University of Calcutta, and earned a law degree in 1931 from the same university. Then he started his law practice at the court of Burdwan.

He is the father of Bangladeshi leftist politician and writer Badruddin Umar.

== Political career ==
Abul Hashim started his political activity with the Muslim League hoping to free Bengal from the political manoeuvrings and the economic exploitations of the non-Bengali landlords and capitalists, like the Khwajas and the Ispahanis respectively. He took part in the election to the Bengal Legislative Council in 1936, and participated in the All India Muslim League conference at Allahabad in 1938. He also participated in Muslim League's Lahore conference in 1940. Hashem, a Muslim with a leftist sensibility, opted to pursue his agenda within the Muslim League and, using his family connections, got elected as the general secretary of the Bengal Provincial Muslim League in 1943. In his memoirs, Abul Hashim mentions that at the meeting where he was elected to the post, he was clad in a dhoti. He was critical of Muhammad Ali Jinnah's vision of East Pakistan, the modern day Bangladesh. The success of the Muslim League soon came through in the 1946 election. He maintained a political proximity with Huseyn Shaheed Suhrawardy and was active in Pakistan Movement.

=== United Bengal movement ===
He participated in the United Bengal movement in 1947, and on 12 May 1947 he together with Sarat Bose met Mahatma Gandhi to discuss the United Bengal scheme and received his blessings. But the day after, on 13 May 1947, the president of the Indian National Congress, J. B. Kripalani, dismissed any notions to "save the unity of Bengal". In reply to the plea, made by Ashrafuddin Chowdhury, a Muslim nationalist and peasant leader from Tippera, Kripalini wrote: "All that the Congress seeks to do today is to rescue as many areas as possible from the threatened domination of the League and Pakistan. It wants to save as much territory for a Free Indian Union as is possible under the circumstances. It therefore insists upon the division of Bengal and Punjab into areas for Hindustan and Pakistan respectively."

After the partition of India, Abul Hashim became the parliamentary leader of the opposition in the West Bengal Provincial Assembly. In 1950, Abul Hashim decided to move to East Pakistan and settled in Dhaka.

== Later life and death ==
In 1940, Abul Hashim began to experience problems with his eyesight, and his condition worsened in 1950 when he became completely blind. Despite this problem, he continued his work in politics, and in 1960, he became the Director of the Islamic Academy. He was also a founding member of Pakistan's Council of Islamic Ideology, a constitutional body established in 1962 by Ayub Khan that exists to this day to advise on the Islamisation of the Pakistani state.

== Books ==
Abul Hashim wrote several books in English and Bengali. Some of his works are:

- The Creed of Islam. Dhaka: Umar Bros. 1950.
- As I see it. Dhaka: Islamic Academy. 1965.
- Arabic Made Easy. Lahore: Sh. Muhammad Ashraf. 1974.
- In Retrospection. Dhaka: Subarna Publishers. 1974.
