= Abul Kasem (politician, born 1872) =

Bengali politician

- Born: 2 February 1872; Kashiara, Burdwan district, Bengal Presidency
- Died: October 10, 1936 (aged 64)
- Education: Presidency College Calcutta
- Political party: Indian National Congress
- Movement: Khilafat Movement
- Children: Abul Hashim
- Relatives: Nawab Abdul Jabbar (uncle); Badruddin Umar (grandson)

Abul Kasem (2 February 1872 – 10 October 1936) was a Bengali politician.

== Early life and education ==
Abul Kasem was born on 2 February 1872 to a Bengali family of Muslim zamindars in the village of Kashiara in Burdwan district, Bengal Presidency. His father Abdul Majid was an officer of the Excise Department. His grandfather Khan Bahadur Ghulam Asghar was the chief sadr-e-amin of the Company Raj.

He received his Bachelor of Arts in 1894 from Presidency College Calcutta.

== Politics ==
Abul Kasem joined the Indian National Congress in 1895. The 12th annual session of the Congress was held in Calcutta in 1896. He was the representative of Calcutta in this session.

His uncle Nawab Abdul Jabbar was the prime minister of Bhopal State. He served as his uncle's private secretary from 1897 to 1902. In 1904, he became a member of the Central Working Committee and the Constitutional Committee of the Congress. He was among the few Muslims who opposed the Partition of Bengal (1905) and played a significant role in the anti-partition movement.

He was elected as a member of the central committee from Bengal in the National Mohammadan Association formed in Calcutta. The president of the organisation was Syed Muhammad Bahadur of Madras. The vice president and secretary were Muhammad Ali Jinnah and Barrister Abdur Rasool respectively. Besides, Abul Kasem was the first secretary of the Bengal Mohammedan Association. Abdur Rasul was its president. Abul Kasem was the founder of the Burdwan Mohammedan Association.

He was elected to the Bengal Legislative Council from Burdwan-Bankura in 1913. He resigned from the Legislative Council in 1920 in protest against the Jallianwala Bagh massacre and the Rowlatt Act in 1919.

After the Khilafat Movement began, he joined the movement in 1920 and became a member of the Khilafat Committee. He was also a member of the delegation sent to Europe under the leadership of Mohammad Ali Jauhar in 1920.

After the movement, he left the Congress. He was a member of the Indian Legislative Council (1921–1923) formed under the Montagu–Chelmsford Reforms of 1919. He was nominated as a member of the Bengal Legislative Council from 1924 to 1926. In 1927, he was re-elected as a member. He held this position until his death.

== Journalism ==
In his early life, Abul Kashem worked as an assistant editor for The Bengali edited by Surendranath Banerjee. In 1906, he and Barrister Abdur Rasool published The Mussulman. He became the first editor of the newspaper. He was also associated with the Muslim Chronicle and Muslim Outlook. He assisted Sher-e-Bangla A. K. Fazlul Huq in publishing the weekly magazine Nabajug. Other magazines he published and edited include Progress, Muslim Standard and the weekly Moslem Bani.

== Philanthropy ==
Abul Kashem was actively involved in relief management in the flood-prone districts of Burdwan, Birbhum and Bankura. These areas were flooded almost every year due to the influence of the Damodar, Ajay and Kunu rivers. He helped in the construction of roads, free health centres and educational institutions. The Burdwan Town School was established because of his initiative.

== Death ==
He died on 10 October 1936.
