= Pulin De =

Indian politician

Pulin De (Bengali: পুলিন দে; May 14, 1914 – October 11, 2000) was a Bengali socialist leader. He was jailed for 12 years during British rule.

== Early life ==
De was born in Dhalghat village, Chittagong District (present-day Bangladesh). His father, Saroda Kumer Dey was a postal employee and mother, Sabitri Debi was a housewife. As a student, he joined the Jugantar movement. He was arrested by the British authorities and jailed for six years. Whilst in jail he obtained his B.A. degree. De was set free in 1938, after which he joined the Congress Socialist Party.

== Political life ==
De was jailed once again in 1941, under the Defence of India Rules. He was released in 1945. Upon his release he was included in the Provincial Executive Committee of the Socialist Party.

After the Partition of India De became the secretary of the Pakistan Socialist Party in East Pakistan. He also served as a professor at Dacca College for four years. He was arrested during the 1952 Language Movement. In 1954 he was elected to the East Pakistan Legislative Assembly from one of seats reserved for minorities.

As of the early 1960s he served as headmaster of Dalghat High School. Due to the political situation, De had to leave Pakistan in 1969.

De's favorite sports were tennis and cricket.

== Death ==
He died on October 11, 2000.
