= Ila Mitra =

Indian politician (1925–2002)

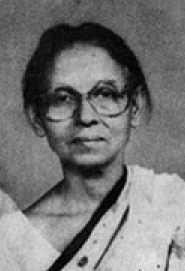
- Mitra in 1955

Member of the West Bengal Legislative Assembly for Maniktala
- In office 1962 – 1971, 1972-1977
- Preceded by: Ranendra Nath Sen, Anila Debi
- Succeeded by: Anila Debi, Suhrid Mallick Chowdhury
- Constituency: Maniktala

Personal details
- Born: Ila Sen; 18 October 1925 Calcutta, Bengal Presidency, British India
- Died: 13 October 2002 (aged 76) Kolkata, West Bengal, India
- Party: Communist Party of India
- Spouse: Ramendra Mitra

Ila Mitra (née Sen; 18 October 1925 – 13 October 2002) was an Indian communist and peasants movement organizer of the Malda division and Rajshahi division.

== Early life and education ==
Mitra's ancestors were from Bagutia village in the present-day Jhenaidah District. She was born on 18 October 1925 in Calcutta. She completed her IA and BA examinations from Bethune College in Calcutta in 1942 and 1944 respectively.

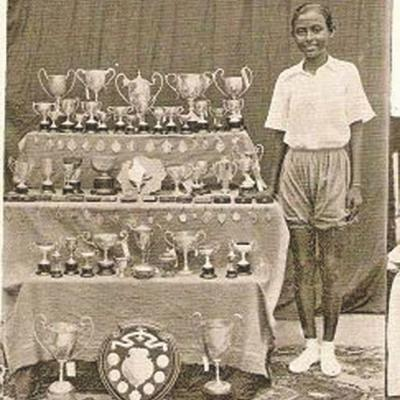
Young Mitra with her awards in athletics

== Leading role in peasant uprising ==
Mitra was the leader of peasants and indigenous Santhals in greater Rajshahi region, currently in the district of Chapai Nawabganj, and was often referred to by them as RaniMa (Queen mother). She organized a peasant-santhal uprising in Nachole Upazila, Chapai Nawabganj on 5 January 1950, but the uprising was thwarted by the police and Ansar Bahini. Mitra was arrested by the police while trying to escape. She was detained at the Nachole police station for four days, and during the detention, she was repeatedly gang-raped and tortured by the policemen. Then she was sent to the Rajshahi Central Jail on 21 January 1950, where she was reportedly tortured for not accepting her involvement in the rebellion. After a trial for treason, Mitra was sentenced to life imprisonment.

== Later life ==
Mitra at Dhaka Medical College, 1954

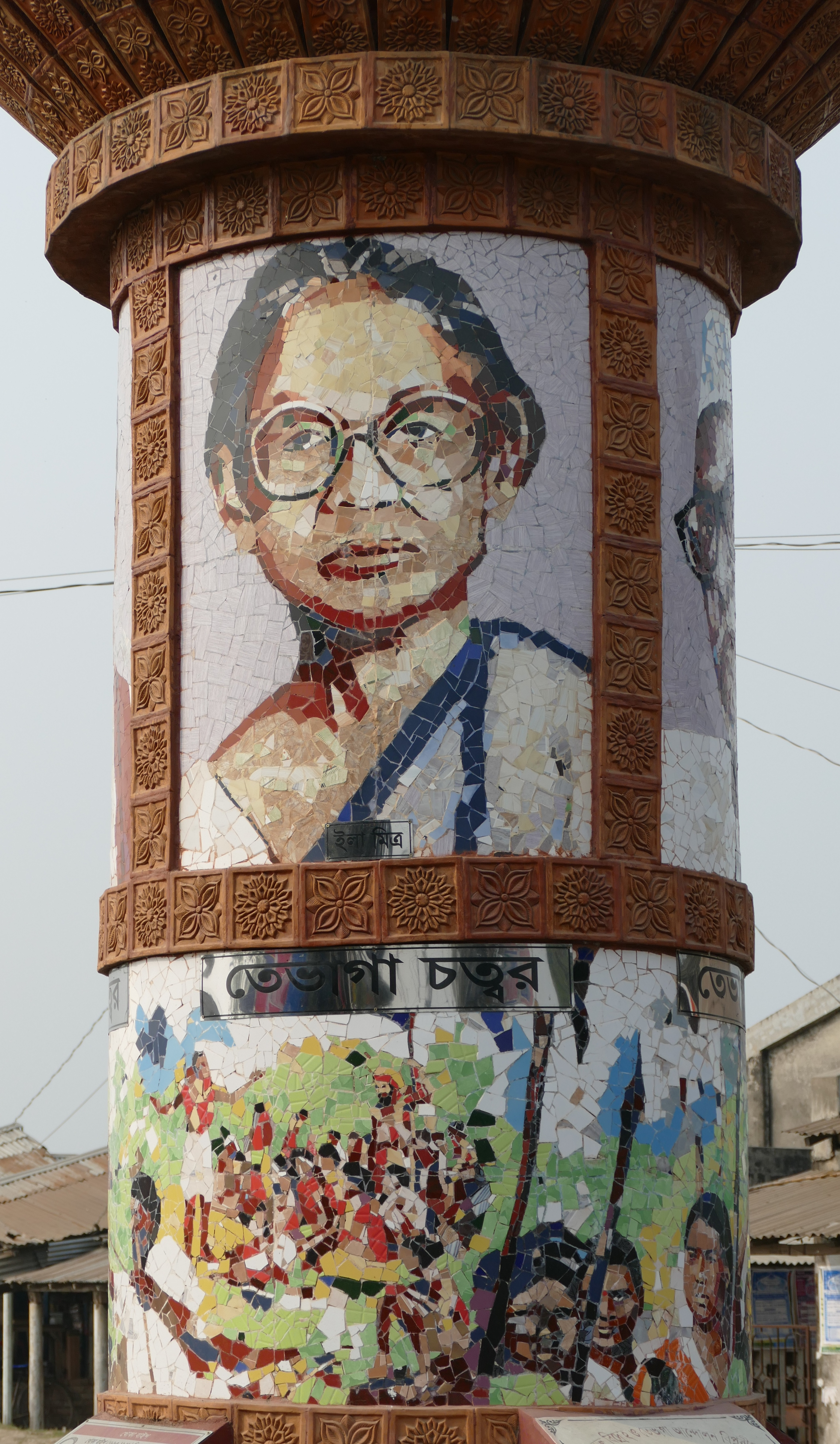
Ila Mitra mural in Tebhaga Chattar, Dinajpur, Bangladesh

Partly due to the torture, Mitra fell very sick in jail. In 1954, the United front government of Pakistan paroled her and sent her to Calcutta for treatment. As she was a Hindu and a Communist activist, to avoid persecution, she did not return to Pakistan and stayed the rest of her life in India. She also participated in mobilizing public opinion and support during the Bangladesh Liberation War of 1971.

She was elected to the West Bengal Legislative Assembly for Maniktala constituency during 1962–1971 and 1972–1977.

She played part in stopping riot against Muslims in West Bengal in 1965.

Mitra died in Kolkata on 13 October 2002.

== Awards ==
- Soviet Land Neheru for literary translation work
- Tamra Patra from the government of India.
