= Badruddin Umar =

Bangladeshi academic (1931–2025)

- বদরুদ্দীন উমর
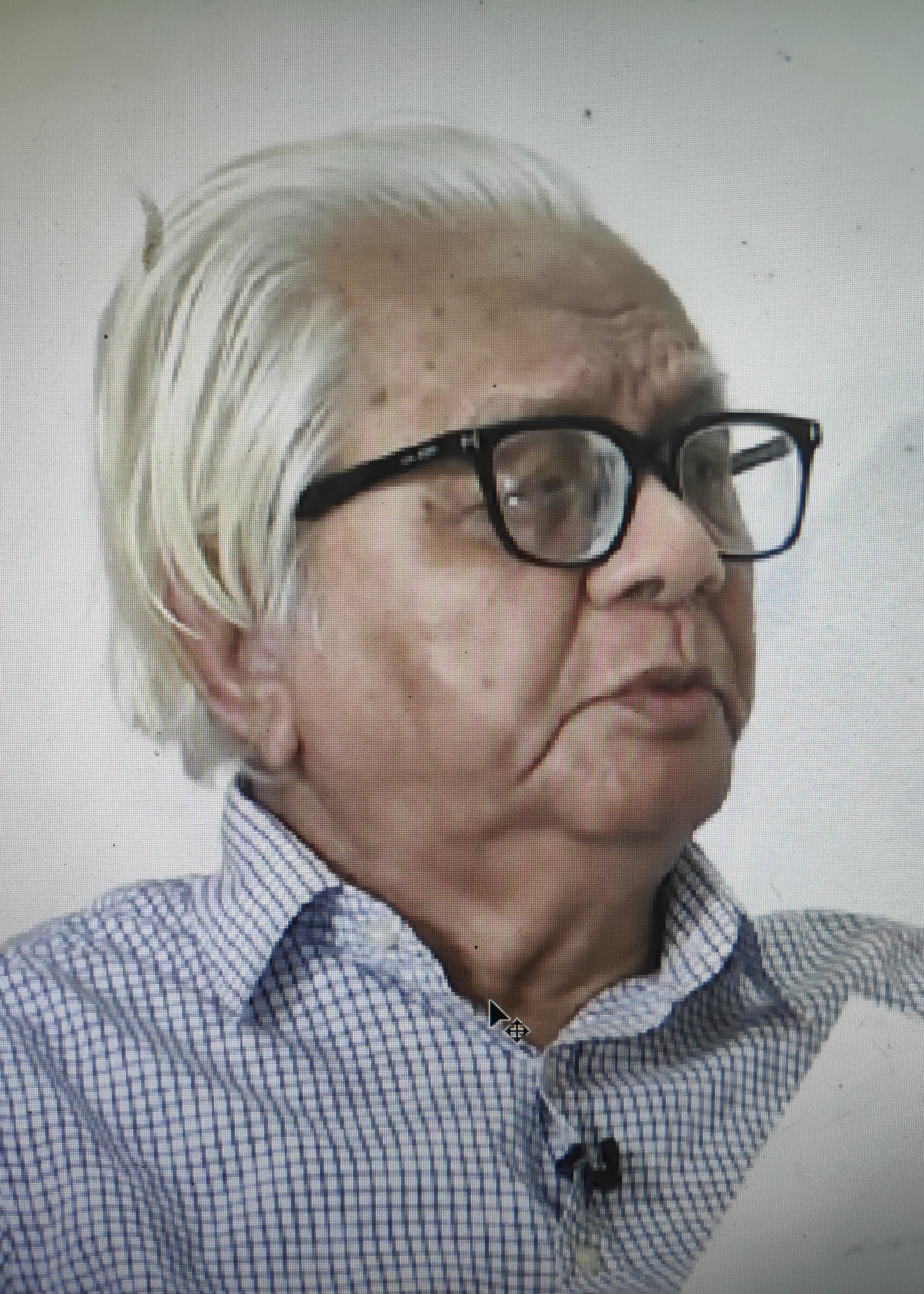
- Pronunciation: [bɔd̪ɾud̪ːin umoɾ]
- Born: 20 December 1931; Bardhaman, Bengal Presidency, British India
- Died: 7 September 2025 (aged 93); Shyamoli, Dhaka, Bangladesh
- Education: University of Dhaka; University of Oxford
- Occupations: Marxist theorist, political activist, historian, writer
- Political party: BSD-ML (Umar)
- Spouse: Suraiya Hanam
- Children: 3
- Father: Abul Hashim
- Relatives: Abul Kasem (grandfather); Nawab Abdul Jabbar (great granduncle)
- Awards: Independence Award (2025)

Badruddin Umar (Note: Bengali pronunciation: [bɔd̪ɾud̪ːin umoɾ].) (Bengali: বদরুদ্দীন উমর, pronounced [bɔd̪ɾud̪ːin umoɾ]; 20 December 1931 – 7 September 2025) was a Bangladeshi Marxist–Leninist theorist, political activist, historian, writer, intellectual, and leader of the Communist Party of Bangladesh (Marxist–Leninist) (Umar). His father, Abul Hashim, was a prominent politician in the Indian subcontinent.

== Early life and education ==
Umar was born on 20 December 1931 to a Bengali family of Muslim zamindars in the village of Kashiara in Burdwan district, Bengal Presidency, British India. Although his father, Abul Hashim, and grandfather, Abul Kasem, opposed the Pakistan Movement, Hashim decided to move to East Pakistan and settled in Dhaka in 1950.

Umar received his MA in philosophy from University of Dhaka and his BA Honours degree in philosophy, politics and economics (PPE) from the University of Oxford.

== Career ==
Umar began his academic career as a teacher at the University of Dhaka on a temporary basis. In 1963, he joined Rajshahi University as the founder-chair of the political science department. He also founded the department of sociology at the same university, but he resigned from his university positions during the hostile times of the then East Pakistan governor Abdul Monem Khan to become increasingly more active and engaged as a full-time leftist political activist and public intellectual to fight for the cause of oppressed peasants and workers in Bangladesh.

== Activism and politics ==
As a follower of Marxist–Leninist principles, Umar began writing anti-colonial articles in the 1970s. In the 1960s he wrote three groundbreaking books—Sampradayikata (Communalism, 1966), Sanskritir Sankat (The Crisis of Culture, 1967), and Sanskritik Sampradayikata (Cultural Communalism, 1969)—that theorise the dialectics of the political culture of 'communalism' and the question of Bengali nationalism, thus making significant intellectual contributions to the growth of Bengali nationalism itself. In 1969, Umar joined the East Pakistan Communist Party (Marxist–Leninist), and from February 1970 to March 1971, Umar edited the mouthpiece of the EPCP (M–L)—Shaptahik Ganashakti—which published essays and articles about the problems and prospects of the communist movement in Pakistan. He was president of both the Bangladesh Krishak Federation (Bangladesh Peasant Federation) and the Bangladesh Lekhak Shibir—the country's oldest organisation of progressive writers, intellectuals, and cultural activists. He was president of the Jatiya Mukti Council (National Liberation Council).

According to Umar, 80% to 90% of the written history of the 1971 war is false. He also stated that Sheikh Mujib wanted to be Prime Minister of Pakistan and that there were many self-contradictory statements in his 7 March speech.

Since 2009, the Awami League government has maintained a tight grip on Bangladesh, akin to an octopus, for over fifteen years. However, the people have now attained a level of freedom through a popular uprising that has not been experienced since 1972. Among the various mass uprisings that have occurred here since 1952, the uprising in July is the most extensive, profound, and aggressive against the rulers.

== Personal life ==
Umar was married to Suraiya Hanam. They had a son and two daughters including Sara Umar.

== Death ==
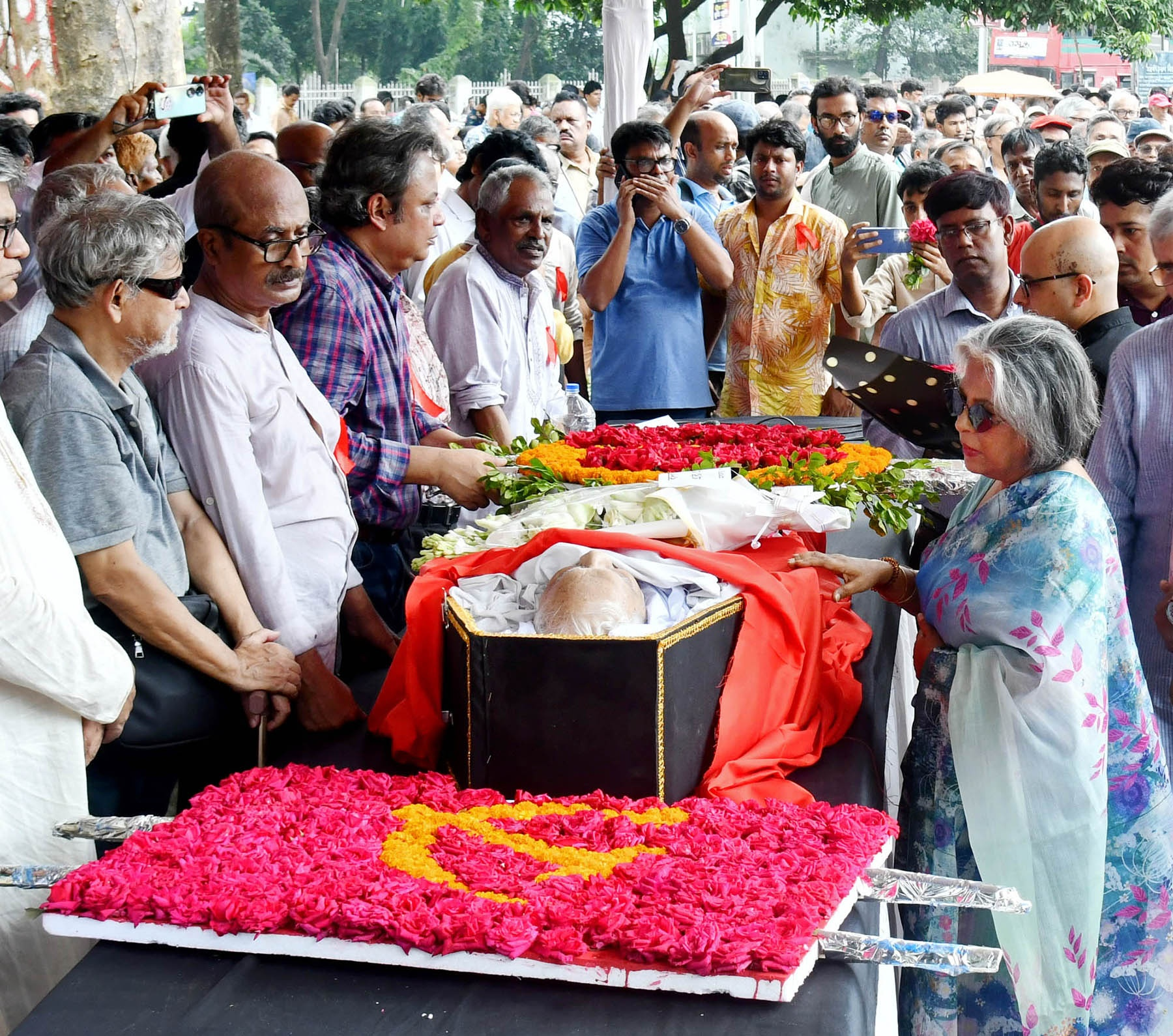
People paying respects at his funeral at the National Shaheed Minar

Umar died on the morning of 7 September 2025, at the age of 93. According to Jatiyo Mukti Council secretary Faizul Hakim Lala, his health deteriorated that morning, and he was taken to a specialised hospital in Shyamoli, Dhaka, where he died. He had previously been hospitalised on 22 July 2025 with respiratory distress and low blood pressure. After receiving treatment for ten days, he returned home the previous week.

== Bibliography ==
Umar wrote nearly 100 books and countless articles. The majority of his books discuss the problems and possibilities of the democratic and socialist transformation of class society. He lucidly and thoroughly exposes the lumpenbourgeoisie's political culture in Bangladesh. In his books he discusses a wide range of issues, including the political economy and culture of capitalism, world socialist movements, communist movements in Bangladesh, the phenomena of militarism and military dictatorships in the Third World, criminalisation of politics, business, and so on. His book titled Poverty Trade engages with the ideas of Dr. Muhammad Yunus and provides a critique of his concept and practice of micro-credit. Umar also researched the Bengali language movement and published a book on this topic.

- Umar, Badruddin Amar Jibon: 1931–1950 (Hardcover, Shahittika, ISBN 984-8391-35-5)
- Umar, Badruddin Banaladese Ganatantrika Swairatantra (Maola Brother's, ISBN 984-410-028-3)
- Umar, Badruddin Bangladeshi Songshadio Ganatantra (Shahityika, ISBN 984-8391-11-8)
- Umar, Badruddin Bangladesher artha-Rajnaitik Paristhiti (Jatiya Grantha Prakasana, ISBN 984-560-007-7)
- Umar, Badruddin Ditiy Awami League Sarkarer amole Bangladesh (Jatiya Anubhaba Prakasana, ISBN 978-984-8237-13-7)
- Umar, Badruddin Ganaadalata, Asamapta Mukhti Samgramera Jera (Mira Prakasana, ISBN 984-775-088-2)
- Umar, Badruddin Nirbacita Rajnaitik Prabandha (Subarna, ISBN 984-459-014-0)
- Umar, Badruddin Sakhinara Candrakala (Ekuse Bamla Prakasana, ISBN 984-8670-97-1)
- Umar, Badruddin Siksha O siksha andolana (Srabana, ISBN 984-8130-12-8)
- Umar, Badruddin The Emergence of Bangladesh: Class and Political Struggles in East Pakistan, 1947–1958 (Oxford University Press, ISBN 0-19-579571-7)
- Umar, Badruddin The Emergence of Bangladesh Vol. 2: The Rise of Bengali Nationalism, 1958–1971 (Oxford University Press, ISBN 0-19-597908-7)
- Umar, Badruddin Indian National Movement: R. R. M. Roy Memorial Lecture, 1984 (University Press, Limited, ISBN 984-05-1208-0)
- Umar, Badruddin Language Movement in East Bengal (Jatiya Grontha Prokashan, ISBN 984-560-094-8)
- Umar, Badruddin "samskritir sankata" 1st published in 1967 by Srabon Prokashoni,(ISBN 984-813-047-0)
