= Mohammad Toaha =

Bangladeshi communist leader and freedom fighter

- মোহাম্মদ তোয়াহা
- Born: 2 January 1922; Hajirhat village, Ramgati Upazila, Lakshmipur District, Bengal Presidency, British India
- Died: 29 November 1987 (aged 65)
- Education: Calcutta University
- Political party: Communist Party of Bangladesh (Marxist–Leninist)
- Other political affiliations: National Awami Party; Purbo Banglar Communist Party
- Movement: Bengali language movement 1969 uprising in East Pakistan

Mohammad Toaha (Bengali: মোহাম্মদ তোয়াহা; 2 January 1922 – 29 November 1987) was a language activist of the Bengali language movement and a prominent left-wing politician from Bangladesh.

== Early life and education ==
Toaha was born on 2 January 1922 at Hajirhat village in Ramgati of Lakshmipur District. He finished his matriculation under Calcutta University in 1939. Later he received his MA in political science in 1948.

== Political career ==
Toaha participated as an activist in Sylhet Referendum under Abdul Hamid Khan Bhashani in 1946. In 1947 he launched the East Pakistan Students Federation, the earliest left-wing student organisation in East Bengal. He was associated with the inception of Awami Muslim League in 1949. According to Badruddin Umar, Toaha refused to join the party because the communal name 'Muslim' was associated with it.

=== Bengali Language Movement ===
Toaha was first active during the initial stages of the Bengali language movement. On 11 March 1948, when a team led by Toaha went to Secretariat to give Khawaja Nazimuddin a memorandum, police arrested him. Later he was tortured by them and had to spend a week in the hospital for recovery. As one of the leaders of the Rashtrabhasha Shangram Committee (State Language Committee of Action), Toaha was used to take part in all the meeting with the government. He was also the VP of the Fazlul Haque Hall of Dhaka University. When Muhammad Ali Jinnah went there, Toaha submitted a memorandum to him about their language demand. He was also vocal against the government's attempt to write Bengali in Arabic script. He was the correspondent of Jubo League at Shorbodolio Kendrio Rashtrabhasha Kormoporishod (All-party Central Language Committee of Action). Later part of 1952, he was arrested for involvements in student politics.

=== 1954–1970 ===
After his release in 1954, he took part in the election that the United Front won. There he was elected as a member of the East Bengal Legislative Assembly. In 1956 he floated a labour organization styled as Purba Pakistan Majdur Federation and was elected its president. In 1957, Toaha was associated with the National Awami Party of Abdul Hamid Khan Bhashani and was later elected its general secretary. With the promulgation of martial law by Ayub Khan in 1958, Toaha receded to underground politics. In 1969 he became one of the organizers of the anti-Ayub movement.

=== Bangladesh Liberation War ===
Toaha formed the Nakshal Bahini in 1970 as a venture of class struggle for establishing communism. During the Bangladesh Liberation War he formed his own group of freedom fighters consisting of the members of the Purbo Bangla Communist Party and developed a free zone in the western area of Noakhali district proper.

=== Post-liberation politics ===
After the independence of Bangladesh, a warrant was issued against him and he went into hiding. After the withdrawal of the warrant in 1976 he came back to open politics. He was elected a member of the Jatiya Sangsad in 1979. In 1986, Toaha contested in the Jatiya Sangsad election as a nominee of 8-Party alliance.

== Death ==
Toaha died on 29 November 1987 at his native village of Hajirhat, Lakshmipur District.
