= Rasaraj Mandal =

Rasaraj Mandal was a member of the 2nd National Assembly of Pakistan as a representative of East Pakistan.

== Career ==
Mandal was a member of the 2nd National Assembly of Pakistan. On 26 September 1956, he was sworn in as the state minister of economic affairs. He was the general secretary of the East Bengal Scheduled Castes Federation.
