= Pakistan Socialist Party =

Defunct political party in Pakistan

Pakistan Socialist Party پاکستان سوشلسٹ پارٹی
- Abbreviation: PSP
- Leader: Mohammed Yusuf Khan, Mobarak Sagher
- Founded: 29 January 1948; 78 years ago
- Dissolved: 1958; 68 years ago
- Headquarters: 2, Terrace de Temple, Ramchander Temple Road, Karachi
- Newspaper: Socialist Weekly
- Youth wing: Pakistan Socialist Party Youth
- Membership (1956): 1,250–3,000
- Ideology: Secularism; Socialism
- Political position: Left-wing
- International affiliation: Asian Socialist Conference
- Colors: Red

The Pakistan Socialist Party was a political party in Pakistan. It was formed out of the branches of the Indian Socialist Party in the areas ceded to the new state of Pakistan. The PSP failed to make any political breakthrough in Pakistani politics. Being a secular socialist party, which had strongly opposed the creation of the state Pakistan, the PSP found itself politically isolated and with little mass appeal. The party was labelled as traitors and kafirs by its opponents. The PSP found it difficult to compete with the Islamic socialism that Liaquat Ali Khan professed to in 1949.

As of 1956, the party claimed that have 3,000 members. A more realistic account, however, would lie somewhere around 1,250. PSP was a member of the Asian Socialist Conference. The PSP youth wing was called 'Pakistan Socialist Party Youth', which was recognised by the International Union of Socialist Youth as a 'co-operating organisation'.

== Background ==
Initially the Indian Socialist Party, which was fiercely opposed to the Partition of India, wanted to retain its organisation in the areas that were to become parts of Pakistan. A Socialist Party convention in Ludhiana held in July 1947 decided that an autonomous party organisation would be formed in Pakistan. Prem Bhasin, a Rawalpindi Hindu member of the party National Executive, was designated to organise the party structure in Pakistan. Mobarak Sagher, another National Executive member who was imprisoned at the time, was designated to organise the party in the North-West.

Once Partition, and the communal violence it brought along, was a fact the idea of a united Indo-Pakistani party was abandoned. The majority of party members in West Pakistan, including Prem Bhasin, fled to India. The Socialist Party had few Muslim members before Partition, and when many Hindu cadres left Pakistan it effectively drained the party of much of its organizational capacity.

Sagher was released from jail in September 1947, and was sent to Lahore. In November 1947 he convened a conference in Rawalpindi, which attracted around fifty participants. The conference decided to break the links to the Indian Socialist Party and that socialists in Pakistan would work to form an independent party of their own. The conference resolved that the goal of the party was to transform Pakistan into a democratic and socialist republic. On the question of Kashmir, the conference called for a referendum to decide the future of the area. Furthermore, the Rawalpindi meeting stated that the Pakistani socialists would advocate Kashmiri integration with Pakistan ahead of such a plebiscite. The declaration on Kashmir illustrated the definitive break with the Indian Socialist Party, and the issue would remain a bone of contention between the Indian and Pakistani socialists.

The Rawalpindi meeting appointed a board which would oversee the preparations for the foundation of the new political party. Mohamed Yusuf Khan was the convener of the board. Other board members were Mobarak Sagher, Munshi Ahmad Din, Siddique Lodhi and Amir Qalam Khan. In December 1947 the board held a meeting in Lahore, at which it was decided to convene a founding conference of the party on 29–31 January 1948, in Karachi. Moreover, the board decided to publish Socialist Weekly (a continuation of Sindhi Socialist Weekly) as the party organ. The Urdu-language Socialist Weekly was published from Karachi. It had a circulation of around 2,500.

== Founding ==
On 29 January 1948, the founding party conference was opened in Karachi. Around 150 persons attended the conference as delegates, although it wasn't clear who the delegates represented. At one point the conference was interrupted, as police entered the premises. The conference could be continued after negotiations with the police. The Karachi conference, constituted the Pakistan Socialist Party and elected a National Executive Committee. The Executive consisted of Munshi Ahmad Din (general secretary), Mohammed Yusuf Khan (secretary), Mobarak Sagher (treasurer), Siddique Lodhi and Ram Mohan Sinha.

The Executive didn't last long, though. Two months later, at Munshin Ahmad Din was elected to the Executive of the Indian Socialist Party at its national conference in Nasik. After the Nasik conference, he didn't return to Pakistan. Soon afterwards, Sinha left Pakistan for India. In a short span, the Executive suffered yet another defection, as Lodhi resigned due to ill health. This left only two members of the original Executive, Khan and Sagher. Khan became general secretary and Sagher took the combined offices of secretary, treasurer and editor of the party organ. Two additional persons, Syed Mohammad Yusuf Rizvi and Khwaja Zahoor Din, were inducted in the Executive. But the leadership of the party was virtually limited to Khan and Sagher.

== West Pakistan ==
In West Pakistan, the party did not contest Assembly elections. It did have some impact in mass organisations, though. The Punjab Pind Committee was a front of the party. The party also managed to gain some influence in the Sindh Hari Committee, and a party member was elected secretary of the organisation. Finally, the PSP was able to capture the Pakistan Trade Union Federation from the communists in 1951. Mobarak Sagher became President of PTUF and Khan Vice-President. Once in control of PTUF, the socialists renamed the organisation as Pakistan Mazdoor Federation and disaffiliated the organisation from the World Federation of Trade Unions. The communists moved to reconstitute the PTUF again.

== East Pakistan ==
In East Bengal, the party membership was predominately Hindu. In March 1950, during the language riots, the party office in Dacca was attacked by a mob. The office secretary was killed. In its aftermath, around 300 party members left East Bengal for India. Amongst those who remained in East Pakistan, several were jailed by Pakistani authorities.

Just ahead of the 1954 East Bengal Legislative Assembly election, the jailed party members from East Pakistan were released. The party contested the elections as part of the United Front. Four party members stoods as candidates, and all were elected to the Assembly. Three of them were elected from seats reserved for religious minorities, contesting as part of the Minorities United Front. The three Hindu legislators elected were Maharaj Trailokyanath Chakravarty, Pulin De and Deben Ghosh. One Muslim party member, Moulana Altaf Hussain, was elected on an Awami League ticket.

Whilst the electoral fortunes of the party in East Pakistan was highly dependent on the reservations for minority communities, the party politically opposed communal reservation of assembly seats.

== Decline ==
The party was able to hold a second national conference in April 1954. Khan Abdul Ghaffar Khan, who had just been released from jail, assisted the conference. The conference decided, along the line of the shifts in the Indian party, to open party membership for anyone who paid the membership fee. This reform was intended to increase the party membership, but in West Pakistan the few newcomers were generally communist infiltrators who were soon expelled. In East Pakistan, the open membership policy was never really implemented.

The running of an all-Pakistan party provided enormous logistical challenges. The Executive Committee could only rarely meet. Effectively a political gap between West and East Pakistani wings of the party grew. In East Pakistan, the party supported the Awami League-led coalition government formed in East Pakistan in 1954. But the West Pakistani socialists opposed an Awami League-led coalition government at the centre.

Other divisions also emerged in the party. In East Pakistan the party was divided along the Hindu-Muslim divide. In West Pakistan, Sagher and Khan clashed with each other. In the end, Mohammed Yusuf Khan was expelled from the party in February 1957. In 1958, all political parties were banned in Pakistan.
