= Abhay Ashram =

Bangladeshi social welfare organization

Abhay Ashram (Bengali: অভয় আশ্রম) is a social welfare organization founded by Dr. Prafulla Chandra Ghosh, Dr. Suresh Bandyopadhyay, Haripada Chattopadhyay and Dr. Nripen Basu in 1910 in Comilla in the then Eastern Bengal and Assam, in present-day Bangladesh. Initially named Savita Mission (Bengali: সবিতা মিশন), it was rechristened to Abhay Ashram by Mohandas Gandhi in 1921.

== History ==
Inspired by the ideals of the Swadeshi Movement, the Savita Mission's primary objective was to empower the rural population though self-sufficiency, entrepreneurship and employment. It also aimed to make the women self-sufficient through weaving and other cottage industries. The Abhay Ashram later manufactured khadi, palibastra, handmade paper and ghanir tel. In 1940 Mahatma Gandhi went at Dohar, Madhurchar-Malikanda village. Profulla Chondra Ghosh and Alam Madbar from Madhurchar village, donated 1.16 acre land at village Madhurchar. On that land Profulla Ghosh established a 100-bed hospital under the care of Abay Ashram for free treatment. Between 1941 and 1945 the hospital was a centre for revolutionary activity connected with Subhash Chandra Bose.
