= Pust =

PUST may refer to:

- Pust, the Slovenian name for Carnival
- Pust (group), a Norwegian vocal group
- Pontifical University of Saint Thomas Aquinas, Rome, Italy
- Pyongyang University of Science and Technology, Pyongyang, North Korea
- Pabna University of Science and Technology, a university in Bangladesh
