= S M Abdul Awal =

Bangladeshi Academician

Professor Dr. S M Abdul Awal
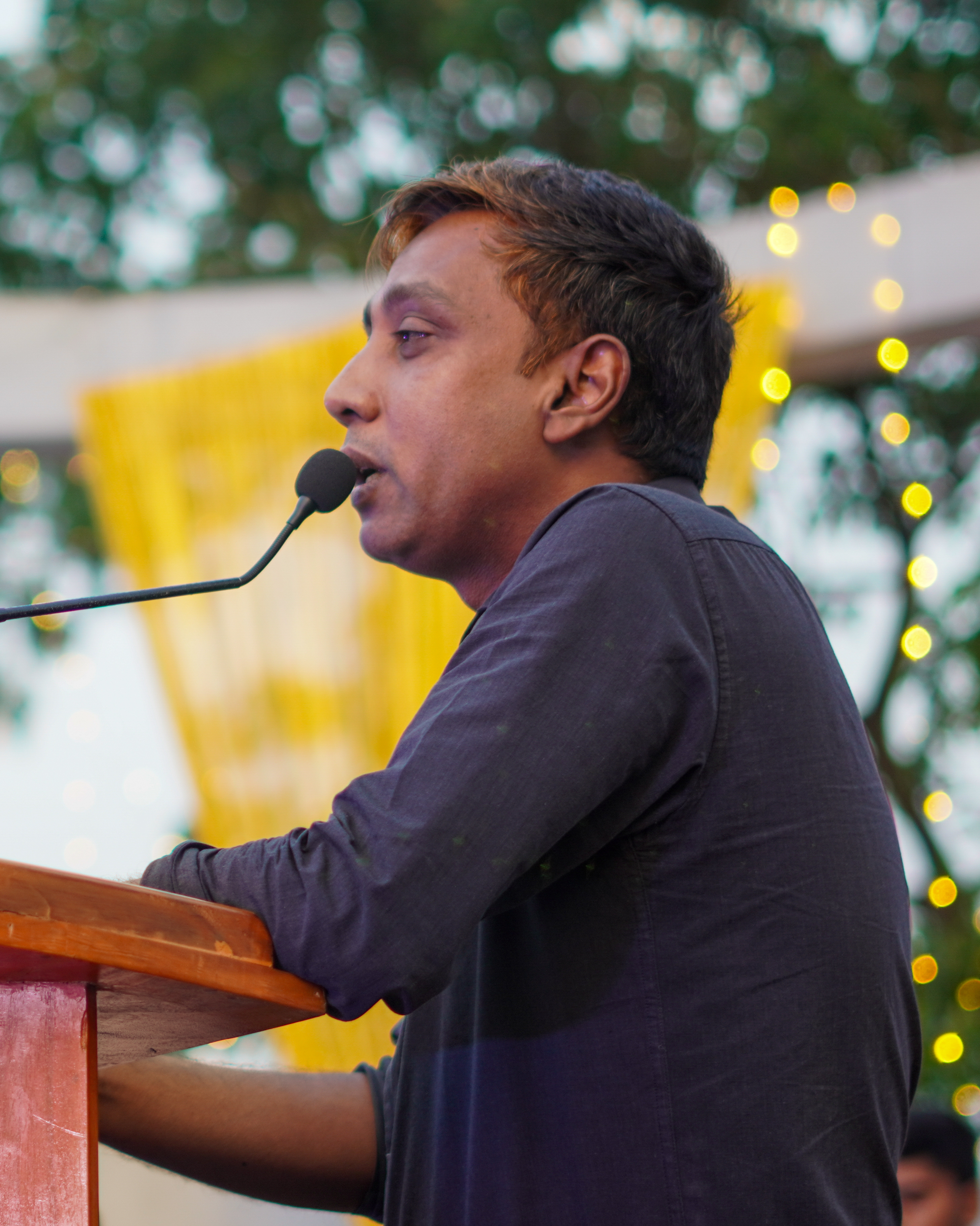

Vice-Chancellor

Pabna University of Science and Technology
- In office 25 September 2024 – 16 March 2026
- Preceded by: Hafiza Khatun
- Succeeded by: Abul Hasnat Md. Shamim

Personal details
- Born: Bangladesh
- Education: Khulna University; Catholic University of Leuven, Belgium; University of Cambridge
- Occupation: Professor, University Administrator

S M Abdul Awal is a Bangladeshi Academician. He is a professor in the Biotechnology and Genetic Engineering discipline at Khulna University and a former Vice-Chancellor of Pabna University of Science and Technology. As of March 2026, he is appointed as the principal coordinator of SDGs in the Prime Minister's Office.

== Education ==
Abdul Awal completed his undergraduate degree in Biotechnology and Genetic Engineering from Khulna University in 2004, securing first place with distinction. In 2009, he earned a master's degree in Bio-Inspired Science with distinction from the Catholic University of Leuven, Belgium. He then pursued a PhD in Plant Science from Churchill College, University of Cambridge in 2015.

== Career ==
S M Abdul Awal is a professor in the Biotechnology and Genetic Engineering discipline at Khulna University. On 23 September 2024, he was appointed as the Vice-Chancellor of Pabna University of Science and Technology. He officially took office on 25 September 2024. Notably, he is the first graduate from Khulna University to be appointed as Vice-Chancellor of a public university in Bangladesh.
