= Kamrunnessa Government Girls High School =

Public secondary school for girls in Tikatuli, Dhaka, Bangladesh

Coordinates: 23.7191°N 90.4220°E

Kamrunnessa Government Girls High School is a public secondary school for girls in Tikatuli, Dhaka.

== History ==
Kamrunnessa Government Girls High School was originally established as a branch of Eden Mohila College. It was separated from the college in 1924 and renamed as Kamrunnessa High School. It was named by Nawabzadi Akhtar Banu after her mother, Kamrunnessa, who was the wife of Khwaja Ahsanullah Bahadur, the Nawab of Dhaka. Khwaja Nazimuddin, the chief Minister of Bengal, nationalised the school after the Partition of Bengal in 1947. It became a government school and was moved to 25 Abhoy Das lane, Tikatuli.

== Notable people ==
=== Faculty ===
- Anwara Bahar Chowdhury, headmistress

=== Alumni ===
- Sheikh Hasina, former prime minister
- Hafiza Khatun, geographer and academic
- Kazi Khaleda Khatun, activist
- Bibi Russell, fashion designer and former international model
