= Kazi Khaleda Khatun =

Bengali language activist (1939–2013)

- Born: August 7, 1939; Pirojpur, Barishal, Bangladesh
- Died: September 28, 2013 (aged 74)
- Citizenship: British Indian (1939-1947); Pakistani (1947-1971); Bangladeshi (1971-2013) Bangladesh
- Occupation: Doctor
- Known for: Bengali language movement

Kazi Khaleda Khatun was one of the school students who took part in the Bengali Language Movement at a young age.

== Birth ==
On 7 August 1939, Khaleda Khatun was born in the Kazi family of Pirojpur, Barishal, Bangladesh. Her father was Kazi Majhar Uddin Ahmed and her mother Hakimunnesa Khatun. Her elder brother is a martyr of the Bangladesh Liberation War.

== Education ==
Kazi Khaleda Khatun finished her matriculation from Kamrunnessa Government Girls High School in 1954. After finishing her Intermatriculation from Eden Women College in 1956, she achieved MBBS degree from Dhaka Medical College in 1968.

== Career ==
She started her career as a lecturer of pathology department in Dhaka Medical College. Later she was a curator of that department. She started working in Iraq under the Iraq government for four years from 1978. In 1983, she returned Dhaka and joined Dhaka Medical College again. She had also worked in the National Heart disease Institute in Dhaka.

== Participation in the Language Movement ==
Khaleda Khatun was a student of the 8th grade during the Language Movement time, in 1952. She was motivated by other language movement activists and took part in this movement actively. In February 1952, she ignored the 144 rule like other language movement activists and attended the meeting at 'Amtola' of University of Dhaka. She also took part at the rally breaking the 144 rule and was tortured by the police. She fell sick due to the tear gas police used at that rally.

== First Martyr Monument in School ==
Kazi Khaleda Khatun along with other female language activists built up a Martyr Monument known as "Shaheed Minar" in Kamrunnesa Govt. Girls School. It was a replica of Shaheed Minar, Dhaka. It was also first monument built up on the memory of language martyrs in any school.

== Death ==
This language activist died on 28 September 2013. She was buried in Mirpur Buddhijibi Cemetery.
