= Hafiza Khatun =

- হাফিজা খাতুন
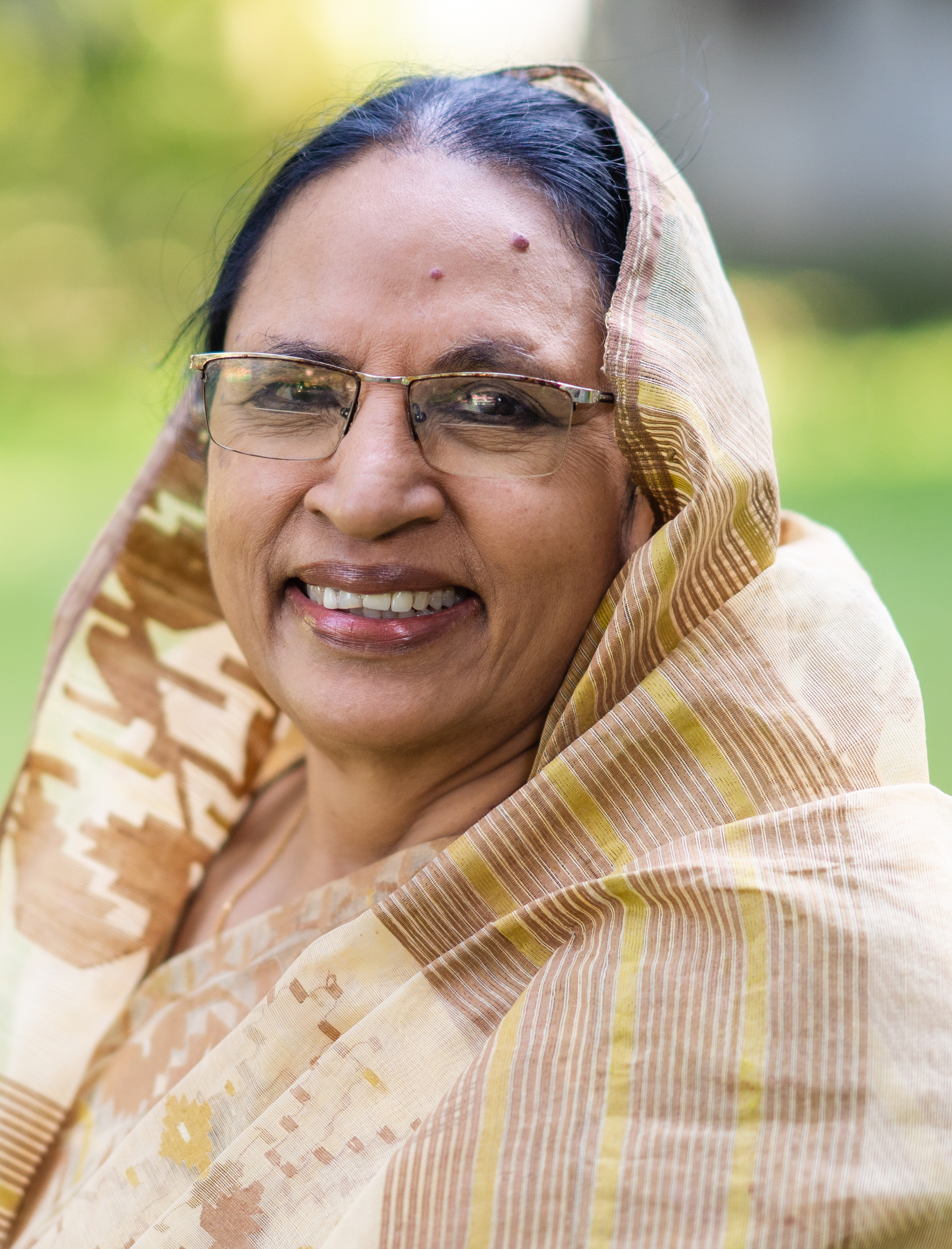
- Khatun in 2020

Vice-chancellor of the Pabna University of Science and Technology
- In office 13 April 2022 – 14 August 2024
- Preceded by: M. Rostom Ali

Personal details
- Born: 12 July 1954 (age 72)
- Education: University of Dhaka; University of Alberta

Hafiza Khatun (born 12 July 1954) is a Bangladeshi academic and a former vice-chancellor of the Pabna University of Science and Technology. She is a professor and former chairperson of the Department of Geography and Environment at the University of Dhaka. She is a member of the University Grants Commission.

== Early life ==
Khatun was born on 12 July 1954. She graduated from Kamrunnessa Government Girls High School and Begum Badrunnesa Government Girls' College in 1969 and 1972 respectively. She completed her bachelor's and master's in geography at the University of Dhaka in 1976 and 1977 respectively. She completed another masters in geography at the University of Alberta. She completed her PhD in 1998 at the University of Dhaka.

== Career ==
Khatun joined the University of Dhaka in 1986 as a lecturer. She was promoted to assistant professor in 1989. She was promoted to associate professor in 1993. She was promoted to full professor in 2000.

Khatun wrote Dhakaiyas On the Move in 2003 which examines the migration of residents of Old Dhaka.

Khatun is a director of the Center for Disaster Research Training & Management at the University of Dhaka. She wrote the Environment and Sustainable Development in Bangladesh in 2018. She wrote Disaster and Despair People at Risk in 2019.

Khatun was appointed the vice-chancellor of the Pabna University of Science & Technology in April 2022. She is the first woman to be appointed vice-chancellor of the Pabna University of Science & Technology. She donated a dinosaur bone to the Bangladesh National Museum.

In February 2024, Khatun was elected vice-president of the Asiatic Society of Bangladesh. She is a member of the Bangladesh Regional Science Association.
