= M. Rostom Ali =

Bangladeshi academic

Rostom Ali is a Bangladeshi academic and former vice-chancellor of Pabna University of Science & Technology. He is a former professor of the Department of applied chemistry and engineering at the University of Rajshahi.

== Early life ==
Ali was born on 16 March 1960 in Pabna District, East Pakistan, Pakistan. He studied at Natia Bari Govt. Primary School. He graduated from Rajshahi Collegiate School and Ishwardi Government College in 1973 and 1976 respectively. He completed his bachelor's degree and masters in chemistry at the University of Rajshahi in 1982 and 1983 respectively. He did his PhD at the Tokyo Institute of Technology.

== Career ==
Ali joined the Bangladesh Institute of Technology, Chittagong as a lecturer of chemistry. He joined the University of Rajshahi in 1989. He was promoted to assistant professor in 1992.

In April 2010, Ali was elected to the Rajshahi University Teachers' Association from the pro-Awami League yellow panel.

In March 2018, Ali was appointed the vice-chancellor of Pabna University of Science & Technology replacing Professor Dr. Al-Nakib Chowdhury.

In October 2019, students at Pabna University of Science & Technology demanded Ali resign following allegations of taking bribes from candidates for faculty positions at the university. Students of the university wanted the vice-chancellor removed from the university.

In January 2022, chairman of the mathematics department, Harunur Rashid, was assaulted when he tried to enter a recruitment meeting of his department. Rashid blamed Ali for the incident. In February 2022, he was confined in his office by students for four hours over allegations of irregularities in recruitment of 101 people. He was freed by Bangladesh Police. He was accused of mismanagement in the recruitment by faculty staff of the university. In March 2022, he was summoned to a Pabna District Court in a defamation case filed by Awal Kabir Joy, proctor of Pabna University of Science & Technology.

== Personal life ==
Ali is married Sharmeen Ali.
