= Pabna University of Science and Technology =

Public university in Bangladesh

Coordinates: 24.0140°N 89.2797°E

- পাবনা বিজ্ঞান ও প্রযুক্তি বিশ্ববিদ্যালয়
- Type: Public university
- Established: 2008; 18 years ago
- Chancellor: President Mirza Fakhrul Islam Alamgir
- Vice-Chancellor: Dr. Abul Hasnat Md. Shamim
- Academic staff: 185
- Students: 4500
- Location: Pabna, Bangladesh
- Campus: Urban, 30 acres (12 ha)
- Language: English
- Website: www.pust.ac.bd

University rankings

Regional – Overall
- QS Asia: 1201-1300 (2026)

Pabna University of Science and Technology (PUST) (Bengali: পাবনা বিজ্ঞান ও প্রযুক্তি বিশ্ববিদ্যালয়; পাবিপ্রবি) is a government financed public university in Bangladesh. PUST was established in 2008. It started its four-year undergraduate programme in 2009.

== History ==
The government passed an act on 15 July 2001 to establish a science and technology university in Pabna.

Amin Uddin Mridha was the university's first vice chancellor, appointed on 11 December 2008. Administrative activities commenced the following month at the university's temporary home, Pabna Teachers Training College (TTC) in Rajapur village, Pabna Sadar Upazila. PUST began with four departments: Electronic and Electrical Engineering, Computer Science and Engineering, Mathematics, and Business Administration. Two hundred students enrolled, divided evenly among the four departments. Instruction began on 4 April 2009 at the TTC.

In 2009, Mridha was replaced by Md. Mozaffar Hossain as vice chancellor. Pabna District transferred to PUST 30 acres (12 ha) in Rajapur village for construction of a permanent campus. PUST also added four departments that year: Information Technology and Communication Engineering, Physics, Applied Physics and Electronic Communication Engineering, and Economics.

Student unrest demanding the resignation of Vice Chancellor Hossain broke out on 17 June 2012. Over the following months students employed various tactics to press their demands, including a boycott of classes, human chain, sit-in, blockade of the Dhaka-Pabna highway, and confining the vice chancellor in the administration building. Activists of the Bangladesh Chhatra League, the student wing of the Awami League, accused the vice chancellor of corruption and nepotism, charges the university administration denied.

Students continued to demonstrate against Hossain even after he left on 22 November 2013 at the conclusion of his four-year appointment. A replacement was not immediately named. Administrative collapse ensued, causing teachers to form a human chain on 23 December, demanding that a vice chancellor be appointed. On 2 January 2014, Al-Nakib Chowdhury took up the post of vice chancellor.

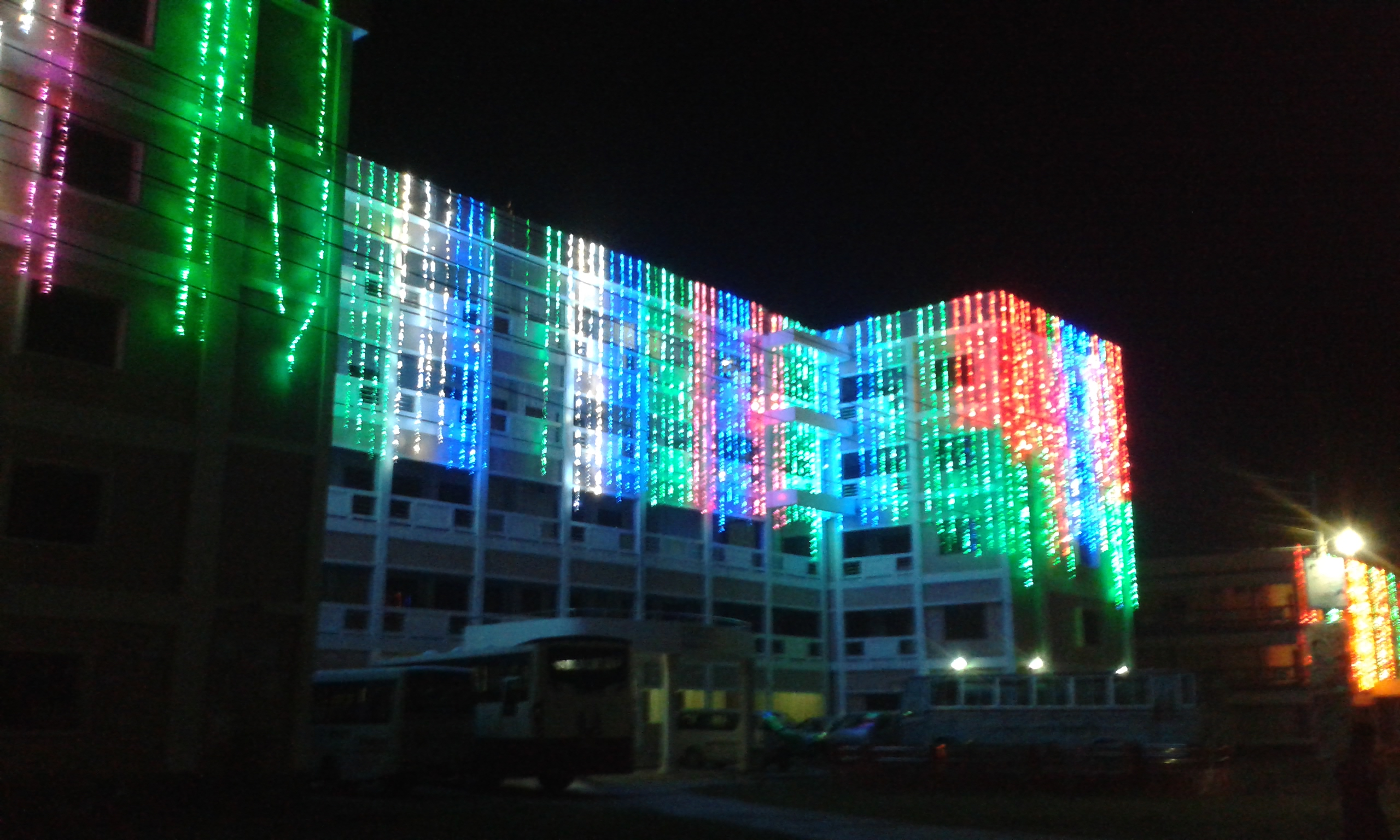
Campus at night

In 2015, the Geography, Environment, and Urban Planning department, introduced in 2012, was split into two: Geography and Environment, and Urban and Regional Planning. In late August 2016, hundreds of students, frustrated by a long-standing problem of frequent power cuts to the dormitories, torched three of the university's buses in protest. The university administration closed PUST for a month to head off further violence.

Chowdhury completed his tenure as vice chancellor on 1 January 2018. On 7 March, M Rostom Ali was named as his replacement. The board of regents closed PUST in November in response to student protests demanding better transportation, housing, food subsidies, security, and WiFi on campus.

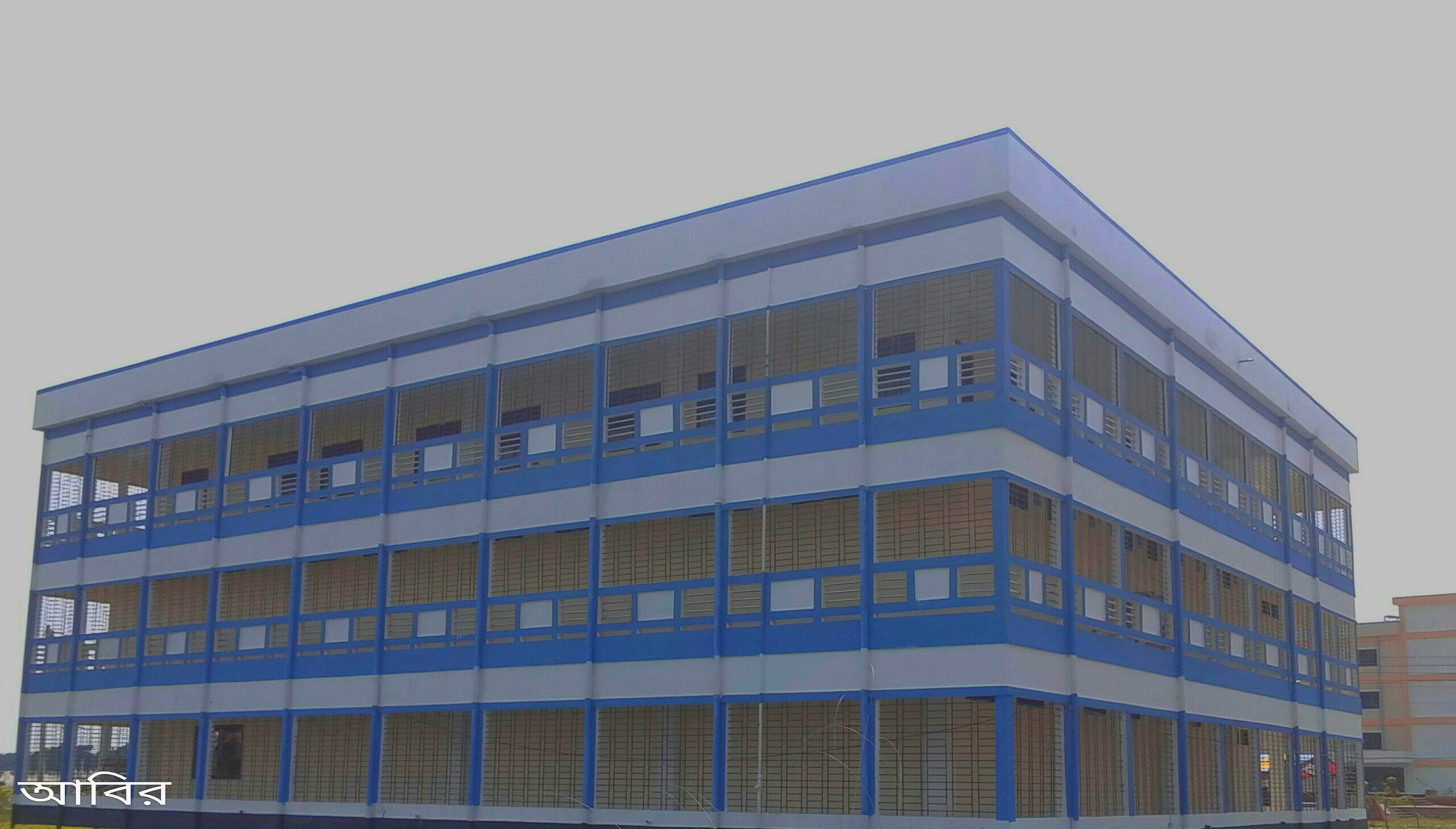
Central Library and Information Center

Allegations surfaced on 26 October 2019 that Ali, as well as the pro vice chancellor, the dean of the Faculty of Arts and Social Sciences, and the department chair accepted bribes from applicants for a job in the History department. Ali denied taking a bribe, but the allegations triggered student demonstrations demanding that he be removed. Protests continued until 11 November, when the university administration accepted some of the students' other demands. Among their complaints were insufficient classroom space, under-staffing of teachers (particularly in the Architecture, History, and Geography and Environment departments), under-resourced laboratories and library, inadequate student housing, poor quality and expensive food, and a shortage of bus transport.

In-person instruction, cancelled for more than 18 months due to the COVID-19 pandemic, resumed in October 2021.

Ali's term as vice chancellor expired on 5 March 2022 during renewed student and staff protests over allegations of corruption and nepotism on his part.

== Campus ==
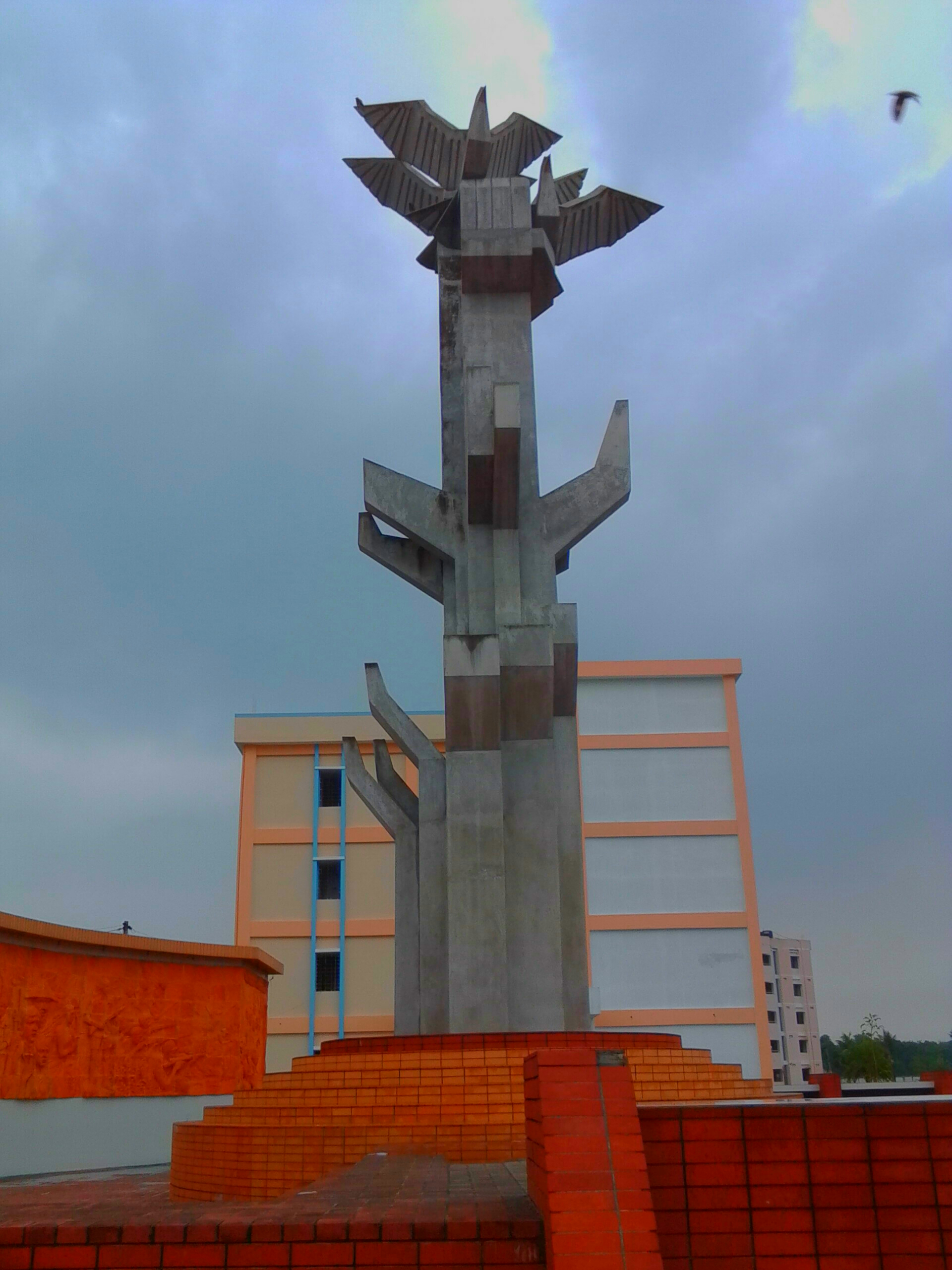
Independence Square at PUST

PUST is located in Rajapur village, Gayeshpur Union, Pabna Sadar Upazila, about 5 kilometres (3.1 mi) northeast of central Pabna. The campus covers 30 acres (12 ha). The Dhaka-Pabna highway passes along the northwest edge of campus and separates it from Pabna Teachers Training College.

At the center of campus are the Central Library and Information Center, Independence Square, and PUST Central Cafeteria. Roughly speaking, administrative offices lie to the north, academic buildings to the south, faculty and female student housing to the east, and male student housing to the west.

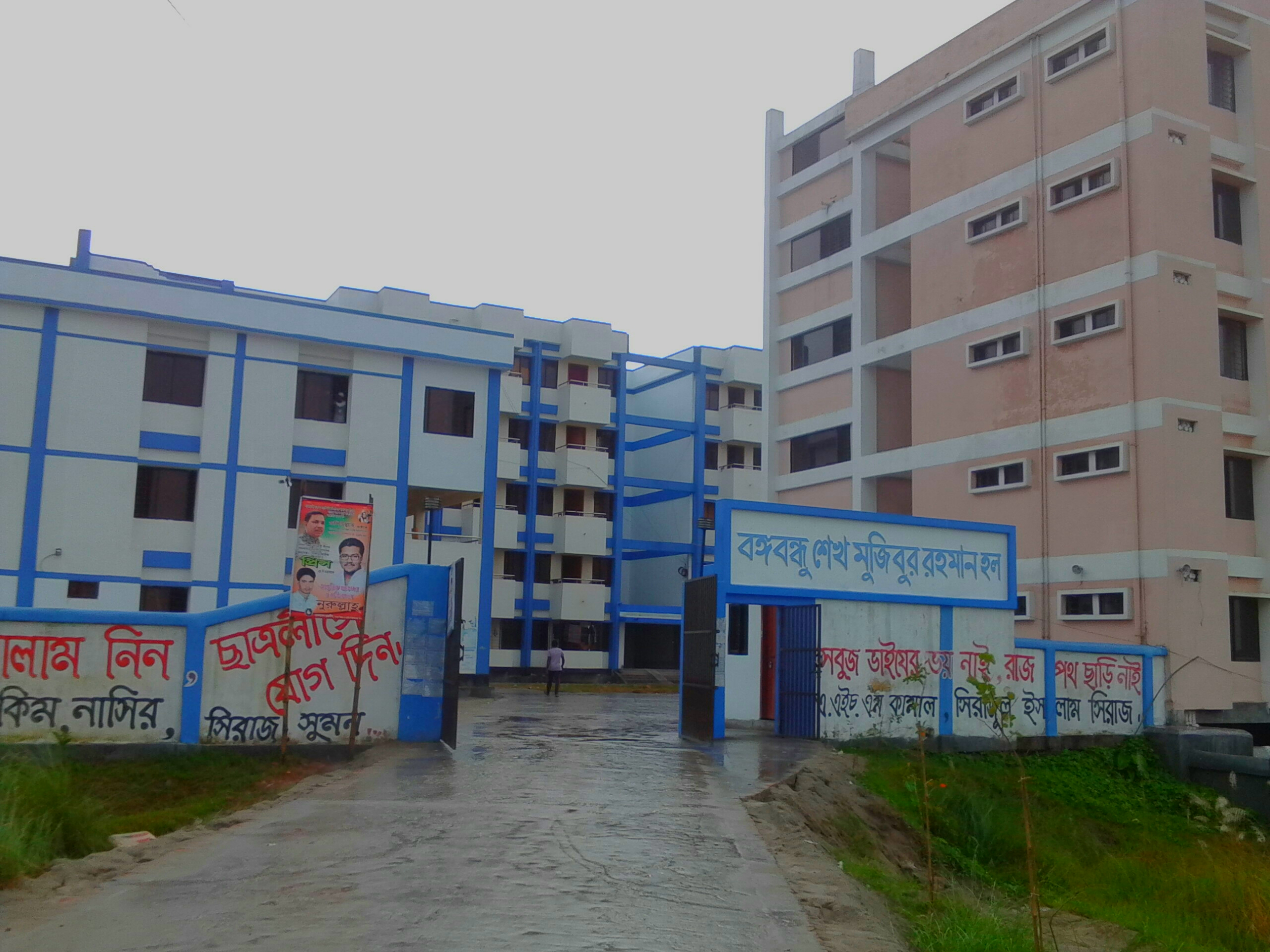
Swadhinota Hall

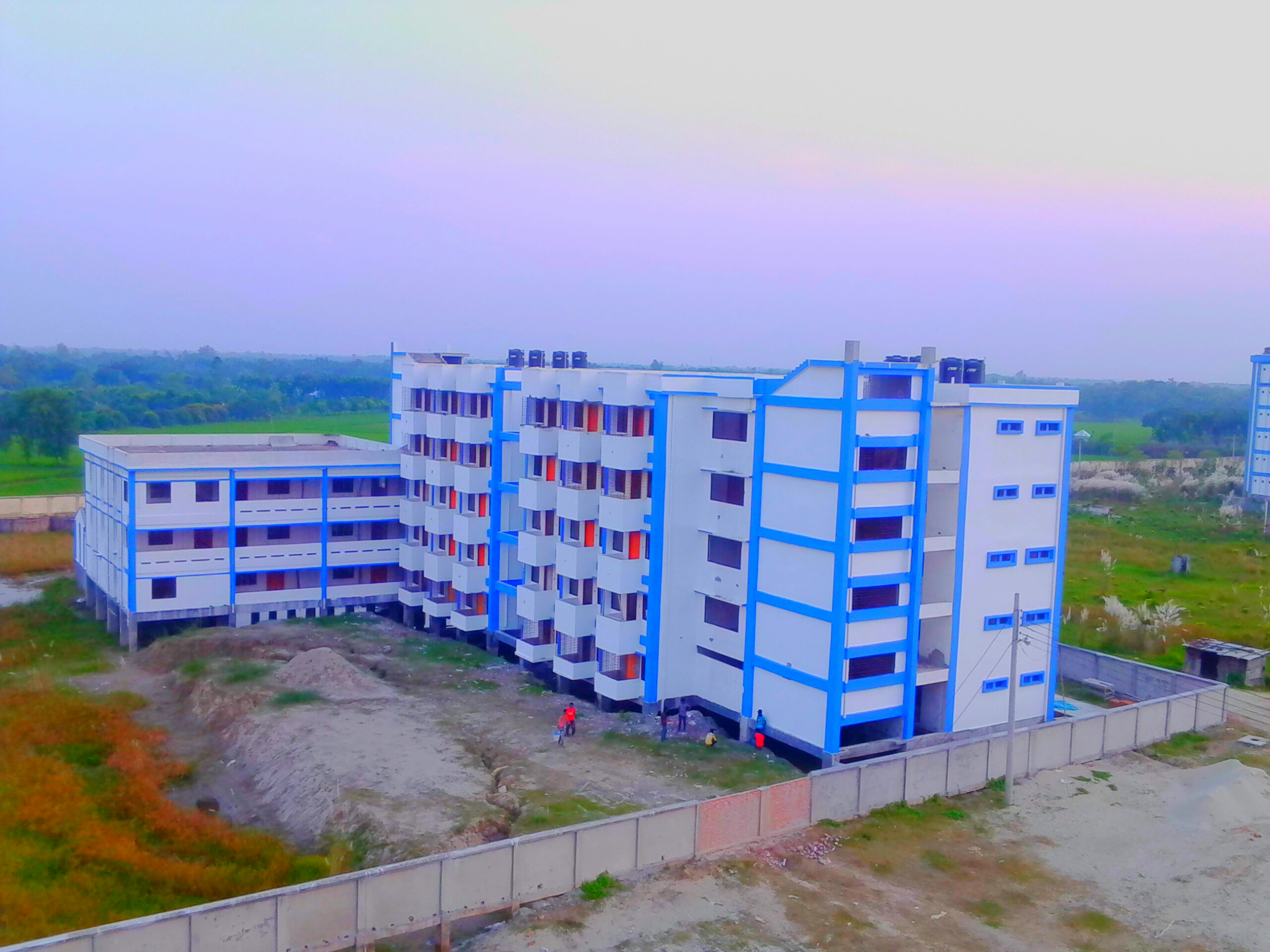
Matribhasha hall

There are four student halls of residence: Swadhinota Hall and 6 July Hall for male students and Matribhasha and Ganatantra Hall for female students. Eighty-five percent of the student body lives off campus.

PUST owns five buses and rents two more from Bangladesh Road Transport Corporation to transport commuting staff and students.

PUST's original buildings are no more than 5 stories high. As of 2023, construction of five 10-storey academic and administrative buildings was being finished by Dhaka-based contractor Hossain Construction Pvt Ltd at a cost of 5.2 billion Bangladeshi taka ($48 million as of 2023).

== Administration ==
- Vice-Chancellor: Dr. Abul Hasnat Md. Shamim
- Pro-Vice-Chancellor: Dr. Md. Nazrul Islam
- Treasurer: Dr. Md. Shamim Ahsan
- Registrar: Bijon Kumar Brahma

=== List of vice-chancellors ===
- Md. Amin Uddin Mridha (2008 – 2009)
- Md. Mozaffar Hossain (2009 – 22 November 2013)
- Al-Nakib Chowdhury (2 January 2014 – 1 January 2018)
- M. Rostom Ali (7 March 2018 – 5 May 2022)
- Hafiza Khatun (13 April 2022 – 14 August 2024)
- Dr. S M Abdul-Awal (25 September 2024 – 16 March 2026)
- Dr. Abul Hasnat Md. Shamim (16 May 2026 – Present-

== Academics ==
PUST has 21 departments in 5 faculties.

=== Faculties and Departments ===
- Faculty of Engineering and Technology
  - Department of Computer Science and Engineering (CSE)
  - Department of Electrical and Electronic Engineering (EEE);
  - Department of Electrical, Electronic and Communication Engineering (EECE);
  - Department of Information and Communication Engineering (ICE);
  - Department of Civil Engineering (CE);
  - Department of Architecture (ARCH)
  - Department of Urban and Regional Planning (URP)
- Faculty of Science
  - Department of Mathematics (MATH)
  - Department of Physics (PHY)
  - Department of Statistics and Data Science (STAT)
  - Department of Chemistry (CHE)
  - Department of Pharmacy (PHARM)
- Faculty of Business Studies
  - Department of Business Administration (BA)
  - Department of Tourism and Hospitality Management (THM)
- Faculty of Humanities and Social Science
  - Department of Economics (ECO)
  - Department of Bangla (BAN)
  - Department of English (ENG)
  - Department of Social Work (SW)
  - Department of Public Administration (PAD)
  - Department of History (HIS)
- Faculty of Life and Earth Science
  - Department of Geography and Environment (GE)

=== Degree programs ===
- B.Sc. (Engineering)
- B. Arch.
- B. URP
- B.Sc. (Honours)
- B.B.A.
- B.A. (Honours)
- B.S.S. (Honours)
- B.Pharm. (Professional)
- MBA (Regular)
- M.Sc. Engineering
- M.S. (Physics)
- M. Engineering
- M.Pharm.
- M.Phil.
- Ph.D.

== Publications ==
- Pabna University of Science & Technology Studies (ISSN 2308-6246)
- Journal of Business Studies, PUST (ISSN 2410-8170)
- Journal of Humanities and Social Science, PUST

== Cultural Clubs ==
- কণ্ঠস্বর আবৃত্তি দল

== Photo gallery ==
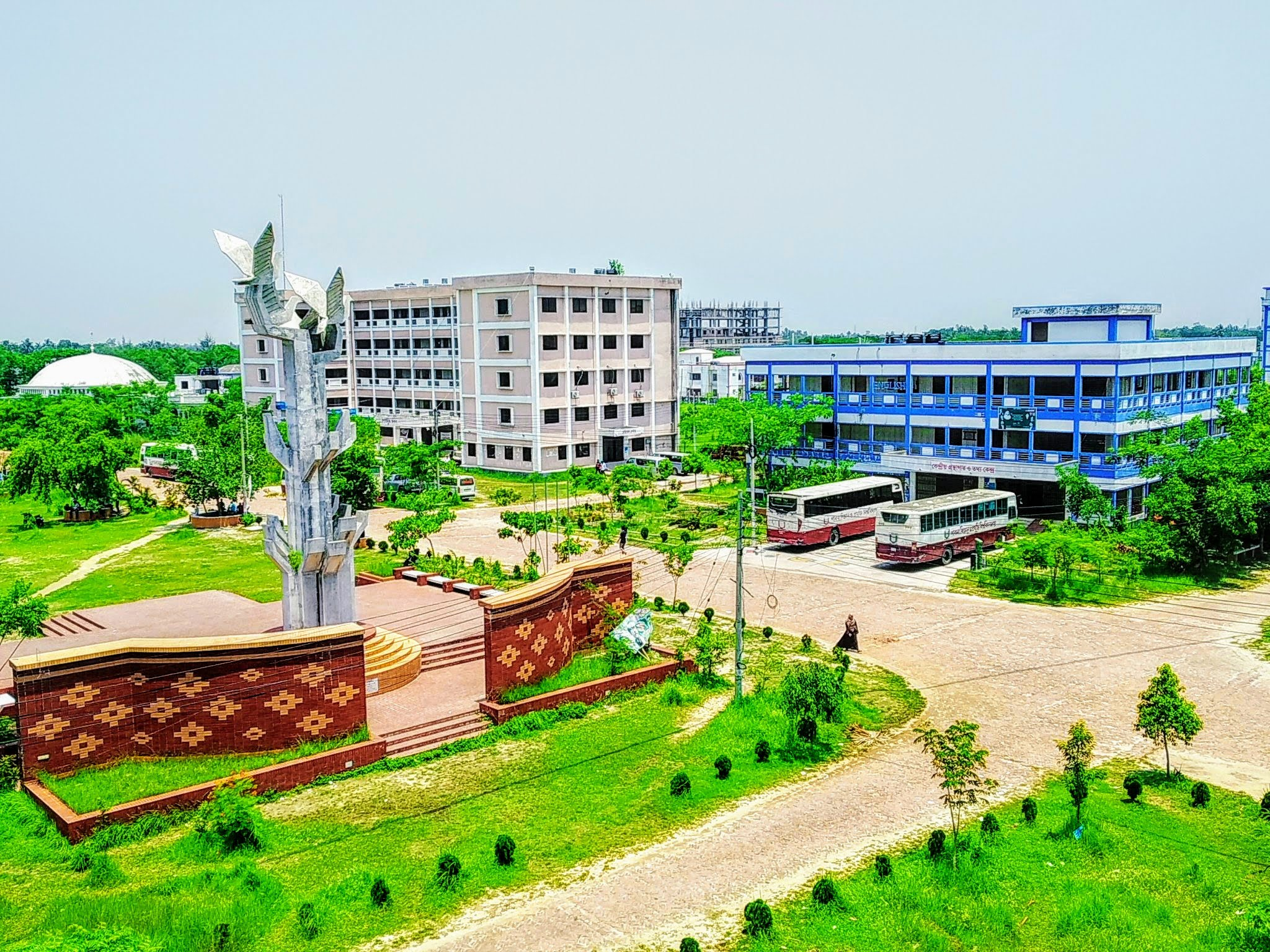
Campus

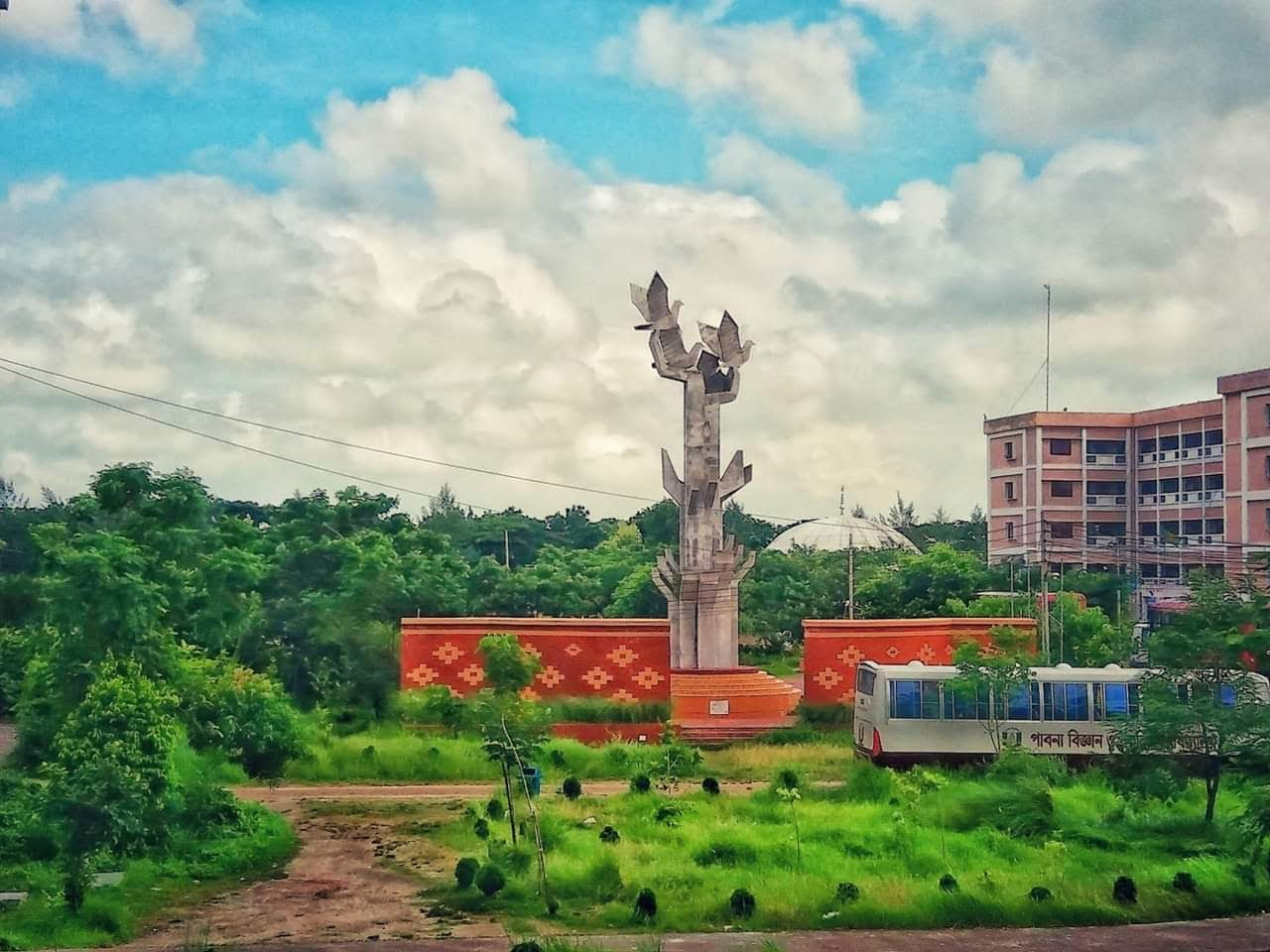
Campus

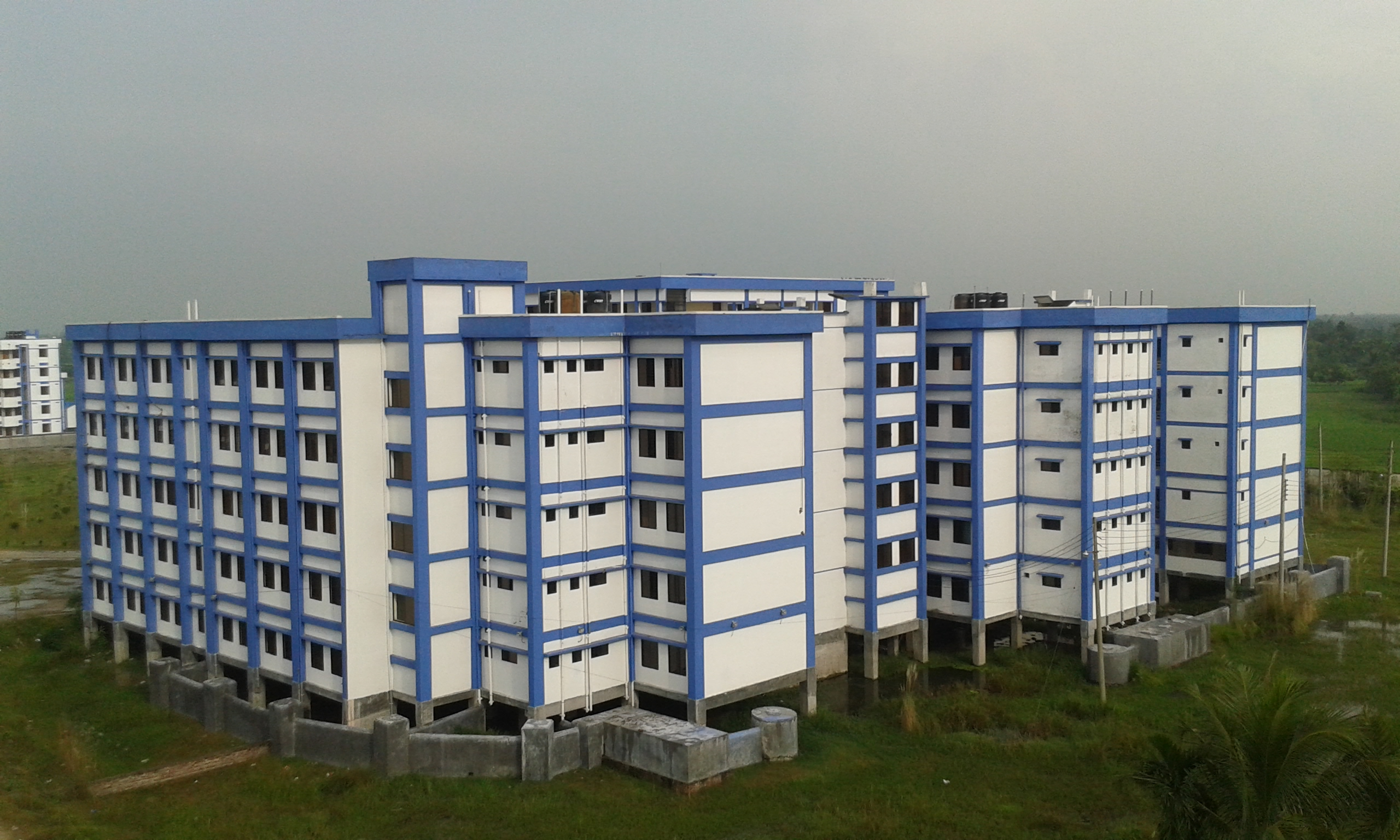
Science Building

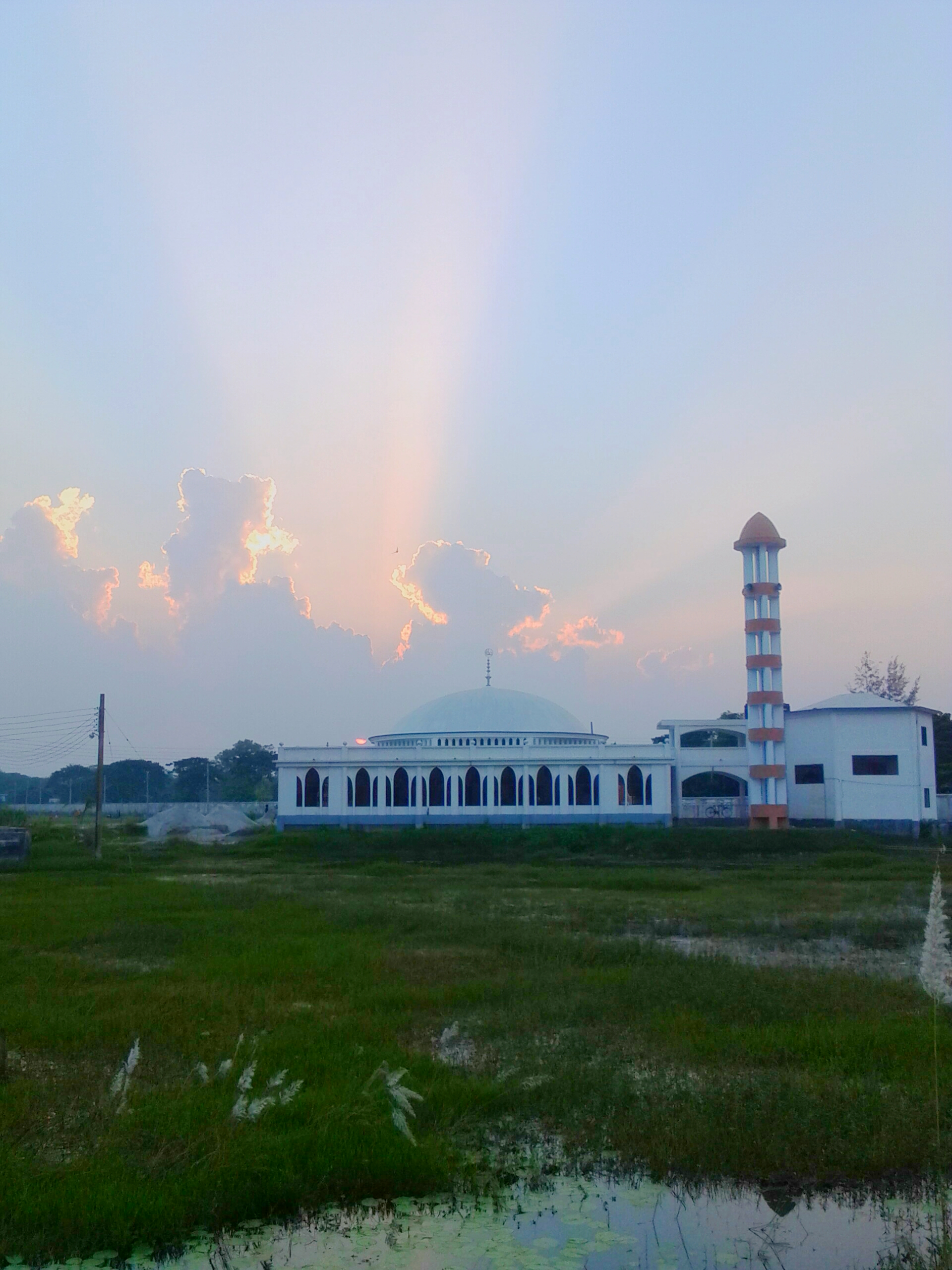
Central Mosque

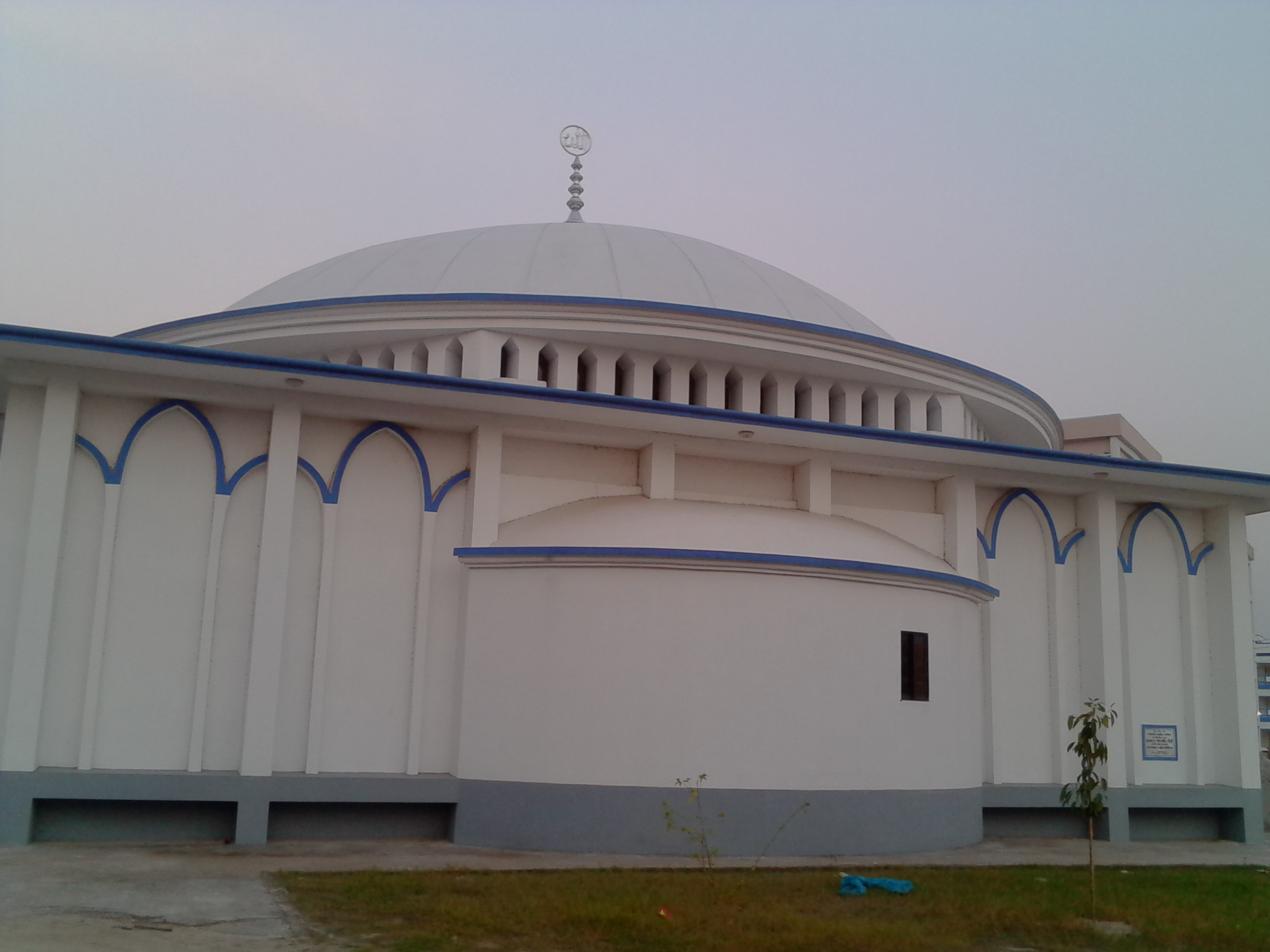
Central Mosque

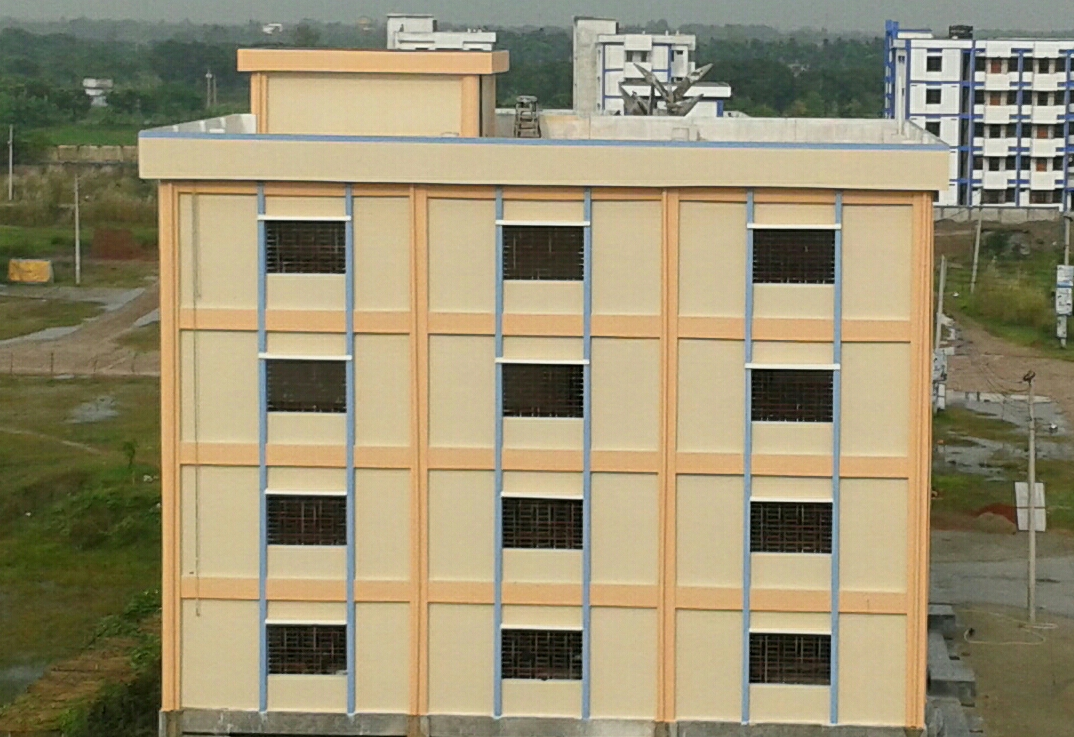
Cafeteria

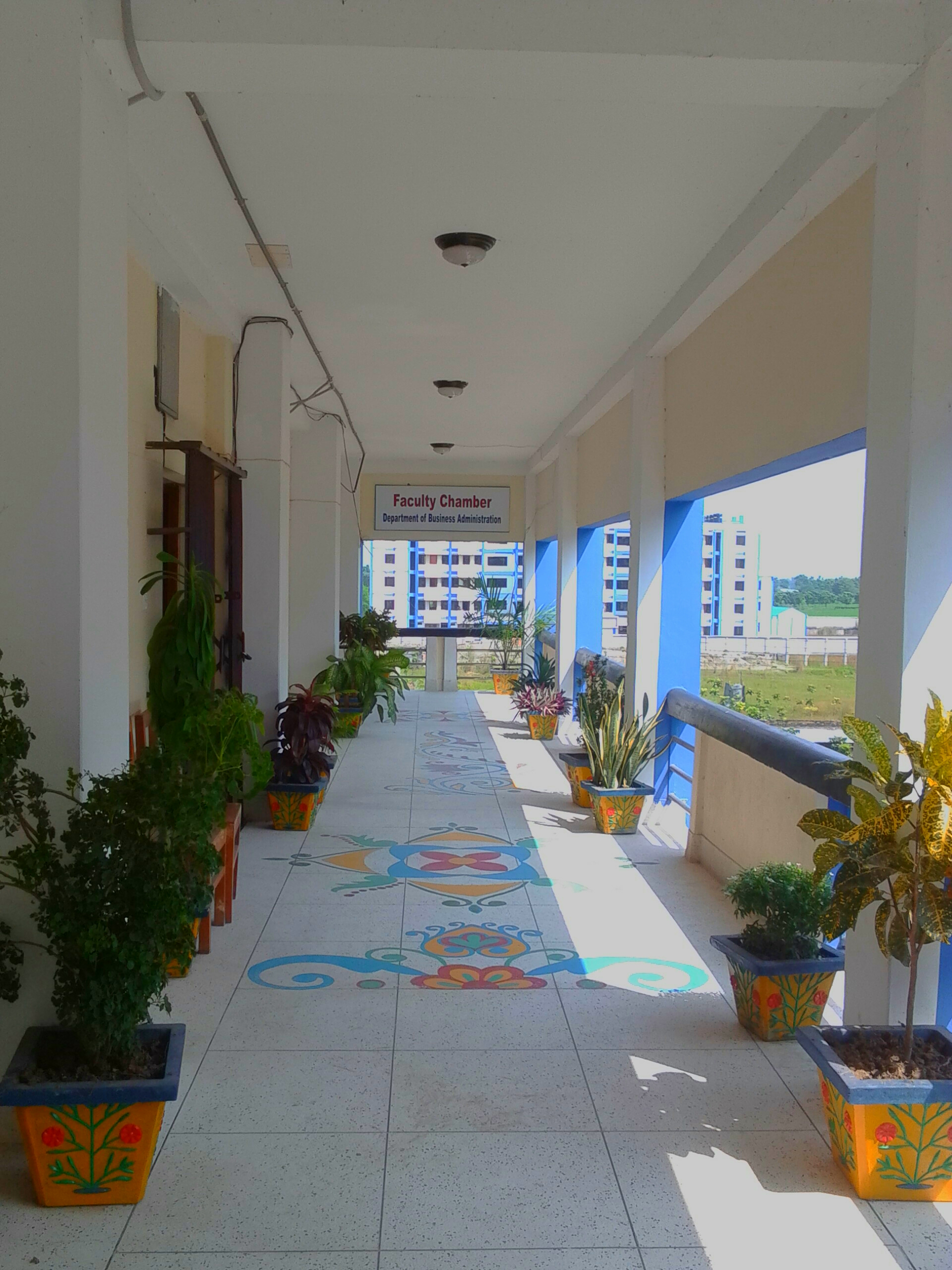
BBA Department

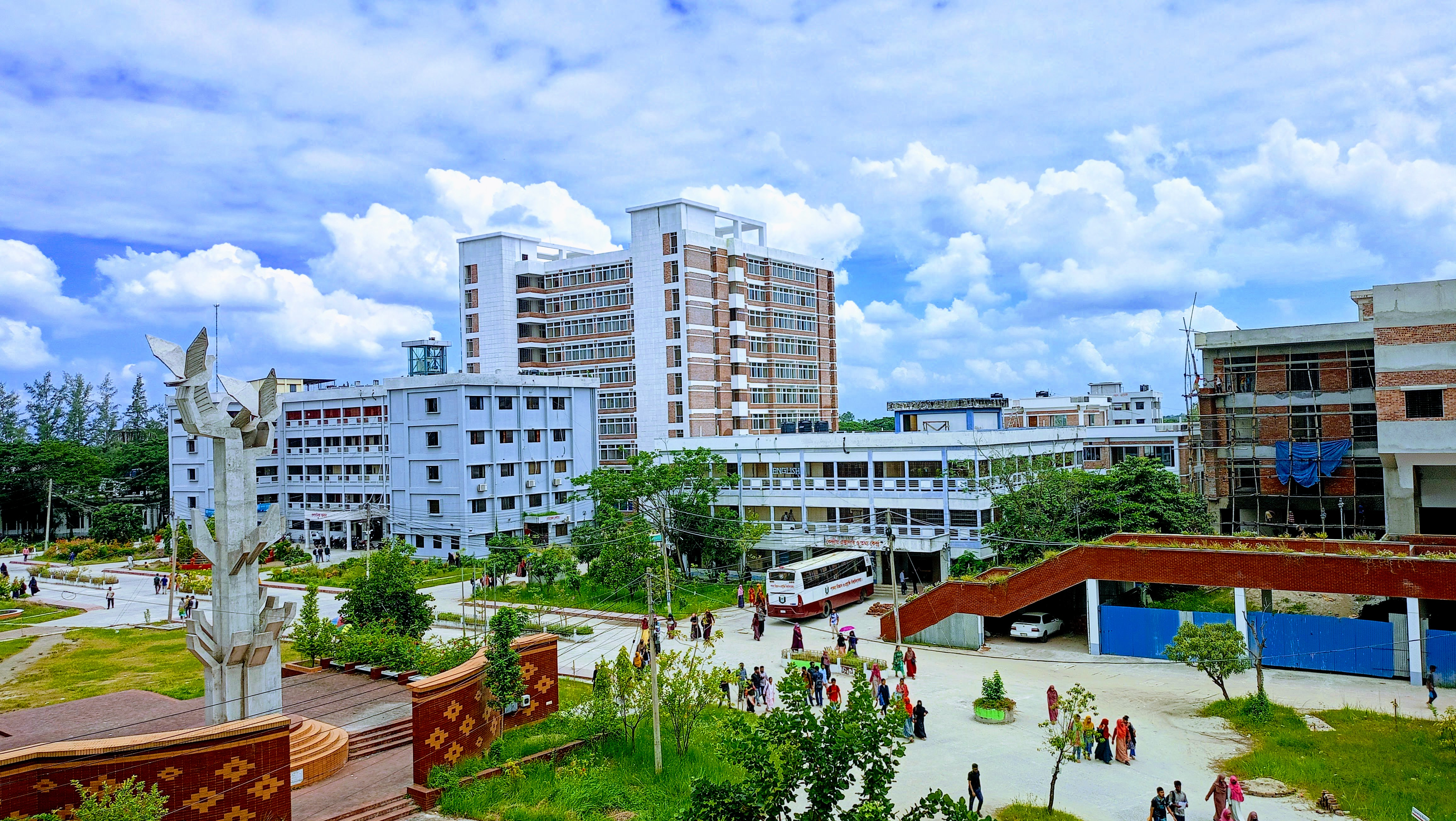
PUST Campus

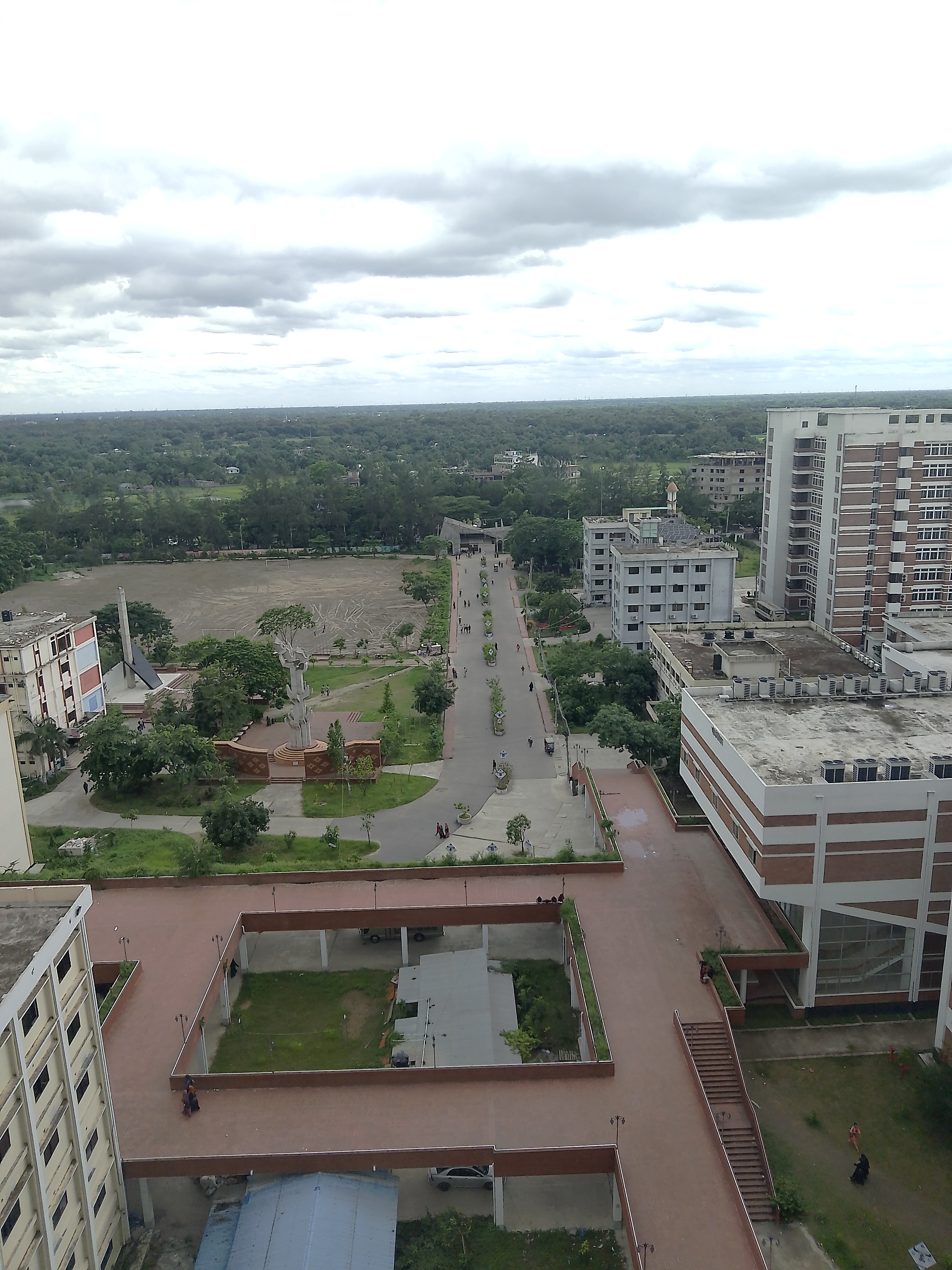

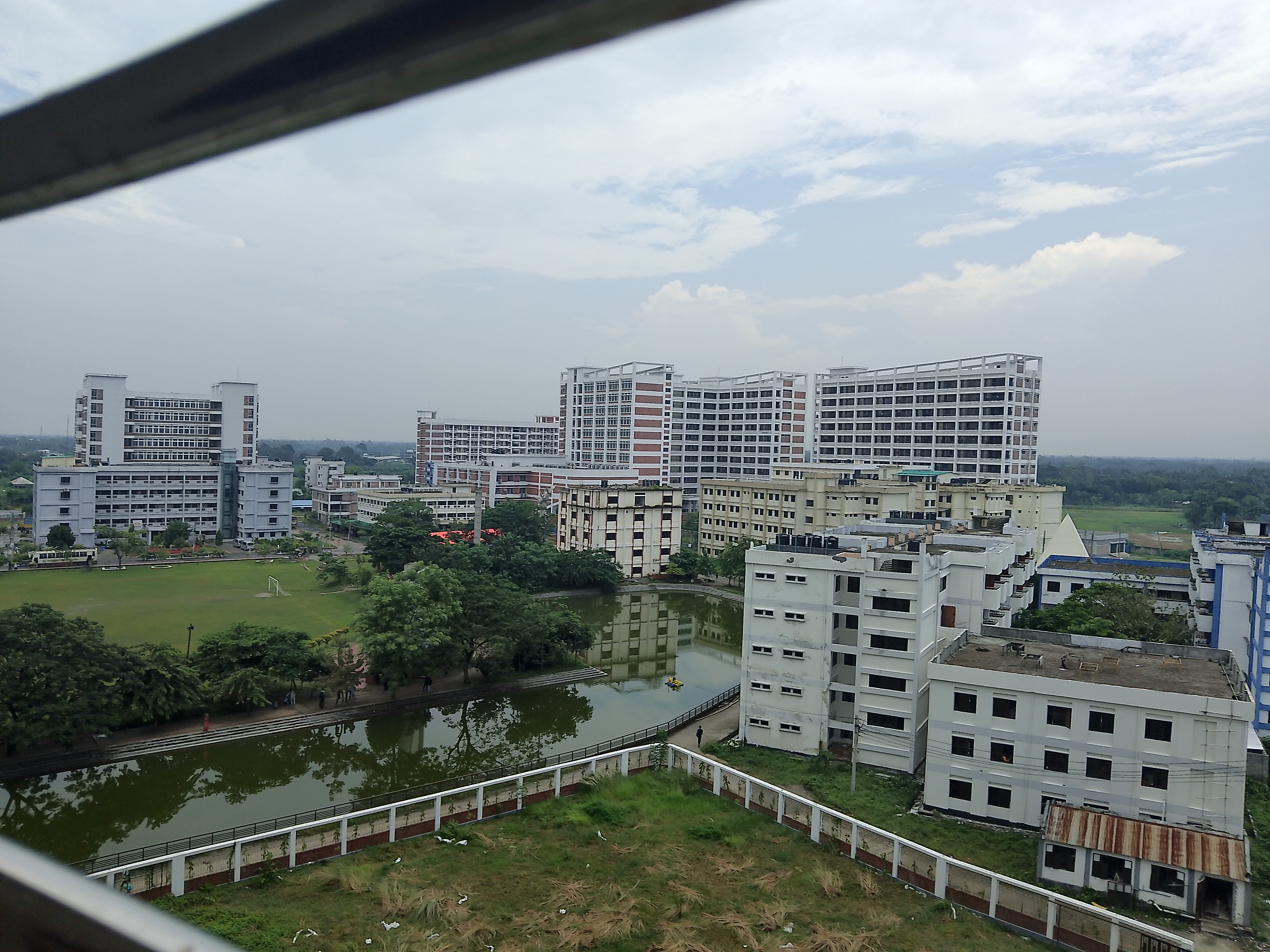

== See also ==
- University of Dhaka
- Bangladesh University of Engineering and Technology
- Jahangirnagar University
- University of Chittagong
- Bangladesh University of Textiles (BUTEX)
- Islamic University, Bangladesh
- Islamic University of Technology (IUT)
- List of universities in Bangladesh
- List of Islamic educational institutions
