= Pust (group) =

Norwegian a cappella group

Pust (meaning Breathe in Norwegian) is a Norwegian vocal sextet a cappella group founded in Oslo in 2003. The ensemble's repertoire consists of their own music and interpretations of traditional songs from Scandinavian countries in new arrangements inspired by jazz, ethnic music and folk music.

In addition to being known as an a cappella group, Pust also collaborates with instrumentalists in certain tracks. They won the first prize for vocal groups at the Tampere Vocal Music Festival held in Finland in 2005. In 2007 they were nominated for Spellemannprisen (Norwegian Grammy Award) for their successful debut album Femkant, which was followed by Kry in 2009. They released Julero that entered the Norwegian Albums Chart at #31 in December 2011.

== Members ==
- Anne Hilde Grøv - soprano (2003-)
- Camilla Susann Haug - soprano (2011-)
- Elisabeth Anvik - alto (2003-)
- Håvard Gravdal - bariton (2003-)
- Mads Iversen - bass (2003-)
- Mattis Myrland - tenor (2023-)

== Discography ==
=== Albums ===
- 2007: Femkant
- 2009: Kry
- 2011: Julero (#31 on the Norwegian Albums Chart)
- 2013: Fryktløs
- 2017: Huggu over vatn
